= ISO 3166-2:TD =

Entry for Chad in ISO 3166-2

ISO 3166-2:TD is the entry for Chad in ISO 3166-2, part of the ISO 3166 standard published by the International Organization for Standardization (ISO), which defines codes for the names of the principal subdivisions (e.g., provinces or states) of all countries coded in ISO 3166-1.

Currently for Chad, ISO 3166-2 codes are defined for 23 provinces (wilāyah).

Each code consists of two parts, separated by a hyphen. The first part is TD, the ISO 3166-1 alpha-2 code of Chad. The second part is two letters.

== Current codes ==
Subdivision names are listed as in the ISO 3166-2 standard published by the ISO 3166 Maintenance Agency (ISO 3166/MA).

ISO 639-1 codes are used to represent subdivision names in the following administrative languages:

- (ar): Arabic
- (fr): French

Click on the button in the header to sort each column.

Code	Subdivision name (ar) (BGN/PCGN 1956)	Subdivision name (fr)	Subdivision name (en) (Note: For reference only, English name not included in the ISO 3166-2 standard.)
TD-BG	Baḩr al Ghazāl	Bahr el Ghazal (local variant: Barh-el-Ghazal)	Bahr El Gazal
TD-BA	Al Baţḩā’	Batha	Batha
TD-BO	Būrkū	Borkou	Borkou
TD-CB	Shārī Bāqirmī	Chari-Baguirmi	Chari-Baguirmi
TD-EE	Inīdī ash Sharqī	Ennedi-Est	East Ennedi
TD-EO	Inīdī al Gharbī	Ennedi-Ouest	West Ennedi
TD-GR	Qīrā	Guéra	Guera
TD-HL	Ḩajjar Lamīs	Hadjer Lamis	Hadjer Lamis
TD-KA	Kānim	Kanem	Kanem
TD-LC	Al Buḩayrah	Lac	Lake
TD-LO	Lūghūn al Gharbī	Logone-Occidental	Western Logone
TD-LR	Lūghūn ash Sharqī	Logone-Oriental	Eastern Logone
TD-MA	Māndūl	Mandoul	Mandoul
TD-ME	Māyū Kībbī ash Sharqī	Mayo-Kebbi-Est	East Mayo-Kebbi
TD-MO	Māyū Kībbī al Gharbī	Mayo-Kebbi-Ouest	West Mayo-Kebbi
TD-MC	Shārī al Awsaţ	Moyen-Chari	Middle Chari
TD-OD	Waddāy	Ouaddaï	Wadai
TD-SA	Salāmāt	Salamat	Salamat
TD-SI	Sīlā	Sila	Sila
TD-TA	Tānjīlī	Tandjilé	Tandjile
TD-TI	Tibastī	Tibesti	Tibesti
TD-ND	Madīnat Injamīnā	Ville de Ndjamena	N'Djamena City
TD-WF	Wādī Fīrā’	Wadi Fira	Wadi Fira

== Changes ==
The following changes to the entry have been announced by the ISO 3166/MA since the first publication of ISO 3166-2 in 1998. ISO stopped issuing newsletters in 2013.

Newsletter	Date issued	Description of change in newsletter	Code/Subdivision change
Newsletter I-8	2007-04-17	Modification of the administrative structure	Subdivision layout: 14 prefectures (see below) → 18 regions
Newsletter II-2	2010-06-30	Update of the administrative structure and languages and update of the list source	Subdivisions added: TD-BG Bahr el Gazel; TD-BO Borkou; TD-EN Ennedi; TD-SI Sila; TD-TI Tibesti; Subdivisions deleted: TD-BET Borkou-Ennedi-Tibesti
Online Browsing; Platform (OBP)	2014-11-03	Add two regions TD-EE and TD-EO; correct spelling of TD-BA; delete TD-EN; update List Source	Subdivisions added: TD-EE Ennedi-Est (fr); TD-EO Ennedi-Ouest (fr); Subdivision deleted: TD-EN Innīdī (ar), Ennedi (fr); Spelling change: TD-BA Al Baṭḩah (ar) → Al Baţḩah
Online Browsing; Platform (OBP)	2020-11-24	Change of subdivision category region to province; Modification of spelling for TD-BA, TD-LO, TD-LR, TD-TA, TD-WF in ara; Addition of local variation for TD-BG in fra; Addition of subdivision name of TD-EE, TD-OE in ara; Update List Source	Spelling changes: TD-BA Al Baţḩah (ar) → Al Baţḩā’ TD-LO Lūqūn al Gharbī (ar) → Lūghūn al Gharbī; TD-LR Lūqūn ash Sharqī (ar) → Lūghūn ash Sharqī; TD-TA Tānjilī (ar) → Tānjīlī; TD-WF Wādī Fīrā (ar) → Wādī Fīrā’

=== Codes before Newsletter I-8 ===
Note: Many of the former prefectures share the same code and name with the current regions.

Former code	Subdivision name
TD-BA	Batha
TD-BI	Biltine
TD-BET	Borkou-Ennedi-Tibesti
TD-CB	Chari-Baguirmi
TD-GR	Guéra
TD-KA	Kanem
TD-LC	Lac
TD-LO	Logone-Occidental
TD-LR	Logone-Oriental
TD-MK	Mayo-Kébbi
TD-MC	Moyen-Chari
TD-OD	Ouaddaï
TD-SA	Salamat
TD-TA	Tandjilé

== See also ==
- Subdivisions of Chad
- FIPS region codes of Chad
- Neighbouring countries: CF, CM, LY, NE, NG, SD
