= 1946–47 Chadian Representative Council election =

Representative Council elections were held in Chad on 15 December 1946, with a second round of voting on 12 January 1947.

== Background ==
The French Constituent Assembly elected in 1945 passed law 46.972 on 9 May 1946, creating a 36-member Representative Council for Chad. The council would be elected by a single college by majority vote in one round. There would be two constituencies, each electing 18 seats. The southern constituency would cover Logone, Mayo-Kebbi and Moyen Chari, and a northern constituency covering the rest of the territory. However, the law was not promulgated in French Equatorial Africa.

Shortly before the end of its mandate, the new Constituent Assembly elected in June 1946 passed law 46.2152 on 7 October 1946, which annulled law 46.972 and gave the provisional government the power to create representative assemblies by decree. This was duly used by Prime Minister Georges Bidault to issue decree 46.2374 on 25 October 1946, creating representative councils for the territories of French Equatorial Africa.

== Electoral system ==
Decree 46.2374 provided for a 30-seat Representative Council, with a term of five years. Ten seats were elected by a First College consisting of French citizens with civil status and twenty by a Second College comprising citizens with personal status or those from areas under French administration (i.e. Cameroon and French Togoland). The elections were held using the two-round system, with candidates required to receive a majority of the vote (and for their vote share to be higher than 25% of the registered electorate) to be elected in the first round. In the second round only a plurality was needed.

Order 3267 on 18 November 1946 created the constituencies used, with seats allocated based on population rather than the number of registered voters:

Constituency	Prefectures	Seats	Electorate
First college
North	BET, Ouaddaï, Salamat (minus Melfi)	4	224
South-West	Rest of Chad	6	611
Second College
I	BET, Kanem, Massakory	2	4,292
II	Ouaddaï	4	3,669
III	Batha, Salamat (minus Melfi)	3	3,160
IV	Bongor, Fort Lamy, Chari-Baguirmi (minus Massakory), Melfi	3	5,547
V	Logone (minus Doba), Mayo-Kébbi (minus Bongor)	5	4,781
VI	Doba, Moyen-Chari	3	6,470

== Results ==
=== First College ===
In the North constituency all four seats were won in the first round by the Republican Union of Chad candidates, with the Union of Left Republicans candidates receiving between 58 and 62 votes. In the South-West constituency, two candidates from Albert Blanchard's Independent List were elected in the first round, forcing a second round of voting to decide the other four seats, with Blanchard himself failing to be elected in the first round. Blanchard's list was competing with a second independent list and the Republican Union of Chad. In the second round the best-placed candidate of the second independent list received only 79 votes.

Constituency	Candidate	Party	First round	Second round	Notes
North	Eugène Sabin	Republican Union of Chad	79		Elected
North	Joseph Schaeffert	Republican Union of Chad	75		Elected
North	William Tardrew	Republican Union of Chad	74		Elected
North	Marcel Lallia	Republican Union of Chad	73		Elected
North		Union of Left Republicans	58–62		
South-West	Louis Richard	Independent List	203		Elected
South-West	Marcel Vincent	Independent List	191		Elected
South-West	Albert Blanchard	Independent List	168	171	Elected
South-West	Jean Anceau	Independent List	153	164	Elected
South-West	Laïdet	Independent List	145		
South-West	Antoine Laubie	Independent List	133	150	
South-West	Martel	Independent List	–	155	Elected
South-West	André Kieffer	Republican Union of Chad	163	170	Elected
Valid votes			500	376	
Invalid/blank votes			10	0	
Total votes			510	376	
Registered voters/turnout			835	611	
Source: Lanne

=== Second College ===
In the Second College, electoral manipulation by the French authorities resulted in conservative candidates winning 13 of the 20 seats. The African Democratic Bloc of Ouaddaï (BADO) filed a complaint, which led to an official inspection. Although the report found a disproportionately high voter turnout in the district of Biltine, Chad and that BADO had obtained the majority of votes in Abéché, the result was not overturned.

Party	Votes	%	Seats
Chadian-French Progressive List	4,842	31.12	7
Progressive and Republican Union of Chad	3,663	23.54	6
Republican Union	2,598	16.70	4
List of Independents	1,681	10.80	3
Communist List	1,078	6.93	0
Franco-Chadian Progressive Group	1,010	6.49	0
African Democratic Bloc of Ouaddaï	376	2.42	0
Independent List	311	2.00	0
Total	15,559	100.00	20
Valid votes	15,559	99.30	
Invalid/blank votes	110	0.70	
Total votes	15,669	100.00	
Registered voters/turnout	27,919	56.12	
Source: Lanne

=== Elected MPs ===
Constituency	Elected member	Party
First College
North	Eugène Sabin	Republican Union of Chad
North	Joseph Schaeffert	Republican Union of Chad
North	William Tardrew	Republican Union of Chad
North	Marcel Lallia	Republican Union of Chad
South-West	Louis Richard	List of Independents
South-West	Marcel Vincent	Independent List
South-West	Albert Blanchard	Independent List
South-West	Jean Anceau	Independent List
South-West	Martel	Independent List
South-West	André Kieffer	Republican Union of Chad
Second College
I	Alifa Zezerti	Chadian-French Progressive List
I	Mohamed Bechir-Sow	Chadian-French Progressive List
II	Henri Montchamp	Republican Union
II	Baroud Adoum Mahamat	Republican Union
II	Abderrahman Diallo	Republican Union
II	Brahim Moustafa	Republican Union
III	Arabi el Goni	List of Independents
III	Adoum Aganaye	List of Independents
III	Kadre Alio	List of Independents
IV	Marcel Tournade	Progressive and Republican Union of Chad
IV	Ibrahim Babikir	Progressive and Republican Union of Chad
IV	N'Daw Alioune	Progressive and Republican Union of Chad
V	Ouaïdou	Chadian-French Progressive List
V	Tobio dit Markinzaye	Chadian-French Progressive List
V	Gontchomé Sahoulba	Chadian-French Progressive List
V	Paul Nodjoudou	Chadian-French Progressive List
V	René Manguet	Chadian-French Progressive List
VI	Toura Gaba	Progressive and Republican Union of Chad
VI	Marc Dounia	Progressive and Republican Union of Chad
VI	Kodebri Nagué	Progressive and Republican Union of Chad

== Aftermath ==
Following the elections, three distinct political groups emerged in the Second College; members of the Chadian-French Progressive List (7 seats), Republican Union (four seats) and Franco-Chadian Progressive Group (unrepresented) formed the Chadian Democratic Union (UDT). A group which later became the Chadian Progressive Party (PPT) was formed by the Progressive and Republican Union of Chad (six seats), BADO and the Communist list (both unrepresented). The third group was made up of the three independents; Adoum Aganaye joined the PPT, whilst Kadre Alio and Arabi el Goni joined the UDT, giving the UDT thirteen seats and the PPT seven.

The Representative Council met for the first time on 30 January 1947 at 8am, when its first session was opened by Governoer Jacques Rogué.
