= French Chad =

French colony between 1900 and 1960

Territory of Chad (1900–1920) Territoire du Tchad Colony of Chad (1920–1960) Colonie du Tchad
- 1900–1960
- Flag
- Anthem: La Marseillaise
- Status: Colony (1900–1946); Overseas territory (1946–1958); Autonomous republic within the French Community (1958–1960)
- Capital: Fort-Lamy
- Common languages: French (official); Chadian Arabic, Sara, Kanembu, Sango
- Religion: Islam, Christianity, traditional African religion
- Governor
  - 1900: Émile Gentil
  - 1959–1960: Daniel Doustin
- Prime Minister
  - 1957–1959: Gabriel Lisette
  - 1959–1960: François Tombalbaye
- History
  - Established: 5 September 1900
  - Merged with Ubangi-Shari: 11 February 1906
  - Integrated into French Equatorial Africa: 15 January 1910
  - Separate colony: 17 March 1920
  - Status changed to overseas territory: 27 October 1946
  - Autonomy: 28 November 1958
  - Independence: 11 August 1960

Area
- 1943: 1,194,508 km^{2} (461,202 sq mi)
- 1950: 1,283,993 km^{2} (495,752 sq mi)

Population
  - 1936: 1,432,600
  - 1943: 1,432,555
  - 1950: 2,241,000
- Currency: French Equatorial African franc (1900–1945); CFA franc (1945–1960)
Preceded by
Kingdom of Baguirmi
Bornu Empire
Ouaddai Empire
Rabih az-Zubayr
Succeeded by
Chad
Borkou-Ennedi-Tibesti Prefecture

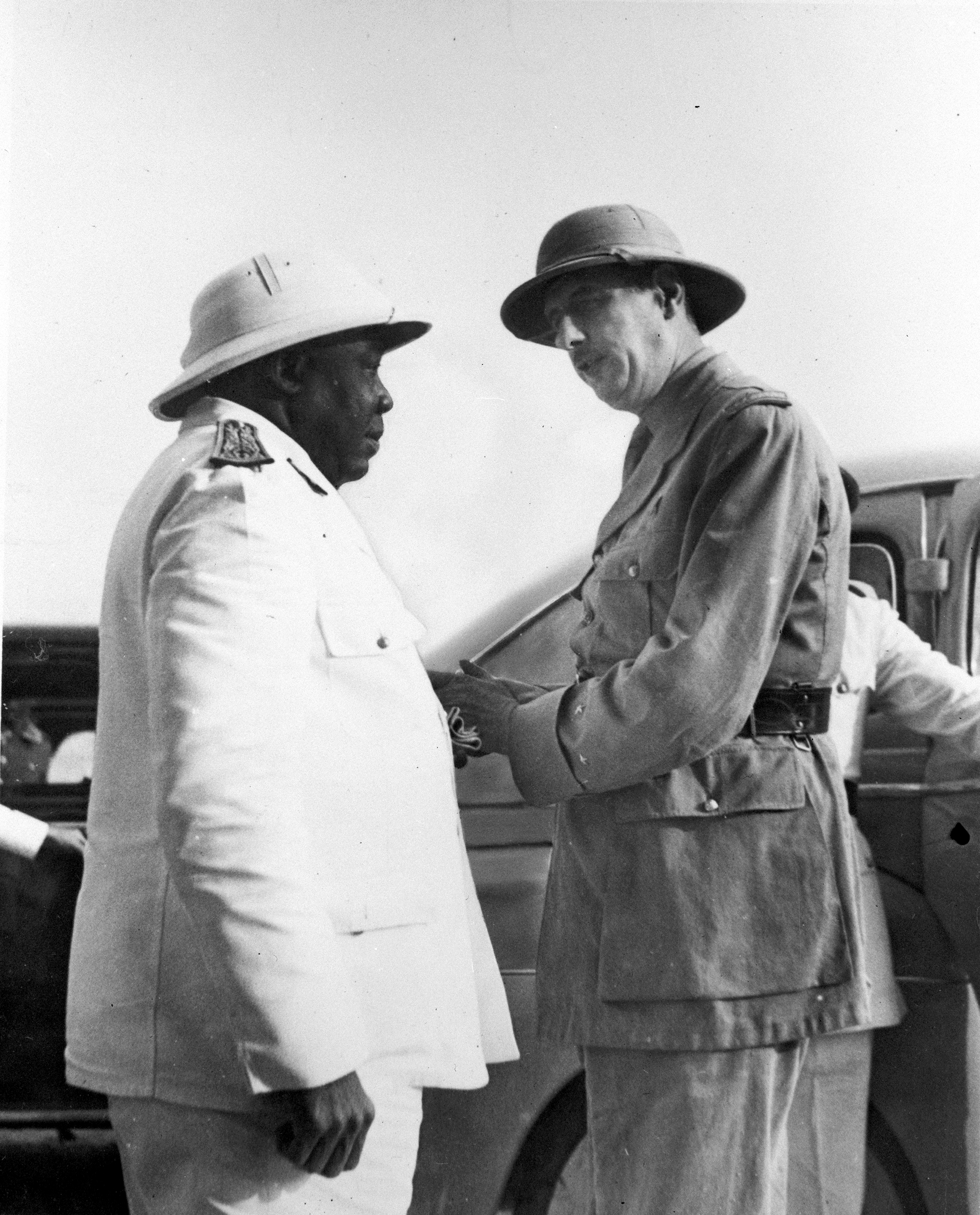
Governor-General Félix Éboué welcoming Charles de Gaulle to Chad

Chad was a part of the French colonial empire from 1900 to 1960. Colonial rule under the French began in 1900 when the Military Territory of Chad was established. From 1905, Chad was linked to the federation of French colonial possessions in Middle Africa, known from 1910 under the name of French Equatorial Africa. Chad passed in 1920 to French civilian administration, but suffered from chronic neglect.

Chad distinguished itself in 1940 for being, under the governorship of Félix Éboué, the first French colony to rally by the side of Free France. After World War II, the French permitted a limited amount of representation of the African population, ushering in a political clash between the progressive and southern-based Chadian Progressive Party (PPT) and the Islamic conservative Chadian Democratic Union (UDT). It was eventually the PPT which emerged victorious and brought the country to independence in 1960 under the leadership of François Tombalbaye.

== French conquest ==
During the 19th century, European interest in Africa grew, and by 1887 France, in search of wealth, had driven inland from its settlements on the west coast of Africa to claim the territory of Oubangui-Chari (present-day Central African Republic). It claimed this area as a zone of French influence, and within two years it occupied part of what is now southern Chad. In the early 1890s, French military expeditions sent to Chad encountered the forces of Rabih az-Zubayr, who had been conducting slave raids (razzias) in southern Chad throughout the decade and had sacked the settlements of Bornu, Baguirmi, and Wadai. After years of indecisive engagements, French forces succeeded in defeating Rabih az-Zubayr at the Battle of Kousséri in 1900. In the following years, the French gradually expanded into eastern and northern Chad, encountering heavy resistance such as in the Wadai War and in Tibesti and Borkou.

France conquered the last of the independent polities in Chad in 1917, and by 1920 had defeated the last major native insurgencies.

== Colonial Administration ==
Two fundamental themes dominated Chad's colonial experience with the French: an absence of policies designed to unify the territory and an exceptionally slow pace of modernization. In the French scale of priorities, the colony of Chad ranked near the bottom; it was less important than non-African territories, North Africa, West Africa, or even the other French possessions in Central Africa. The French came to perceive Chad primarily as a source of raw cotton and untrained labour to be used in the more productive colonies to the south. Within Chad, there was neither the will nor the resources to do much more than maintain a semblance of law and order. In fact, even this basic function of governance was often neglected; throughout the colonial period, large areas of Chad were never governed effectively from N'Djamena (called Fort-Lamy prior to September 1973).

Chad was linked in 1905 with three French colonies to the south—Oubangui-Chari, Middle Congo (present-day Congo-Brazzaville), and Gabon. But Chad did not receive separate colony status or a unified administrative policy until 1920. The four colonies were administered together as French Equatorial Africa under the direction of a governor general stationed in Brazzaville. The governor general had broad administrative control over the federation, including external and internal security, economic and financial affairs, and all communications with the French minister of the colonies. Lieutenant governors, also appointed by the French government, were expected to implement in each colony the orders of the governor general. The central administration in Brazzaville tightly controlled the lieutenant governors despite reformist efforts toward decentralisation between 1910 and 1946. Chad's lieutenant governor had greater autonomy because of the distance from Brazzaville and because of France's much greater interest in the other three colonies. As for the number of troops deployed in the country, there were three battalions for a total of about 3,000 soldiers.

During British invasion of Darfur, Fur forces following the Ottoman declaration of jihad, made incursions into French Chad.

The lines of control from Brazzaville, feeble as they may have been, were still stronger than those from N'Djamena to its hinterland. In the huge Borkou-Ennedi-Tibesti Region, the handful of French military administrators soon reached a tacit agreement with the inhabitants of the desert; as long as caravan trails remained relatively secure and minimal levels of law and order were met, the military administration (headquartered in Faya Largeau) usually left the people alone. In central Chad, French rule was only slightly more substantive. In Ouaddaï and Biltine prefectures, endemic resistance continued against the French and, in some cases, against any authority that attempted to suppress banditry and brigandage. The thinly staffed colonial administration provided only weak supervision over arid Kanem Prefecture and the sparsely populated areas of Guéra and Salamat prefectures. Old-fashioned razzias continued in the 1920s, and it was reported in 1923 that a group of Senegalese Muslims on their way to Mecca had been seized and sold into slavery. Unwilling to expend the resources required for effective administration, the French government responded with sporadic coercion and a growing reliance on indirect rule through the sultanates.

France managed to govern effectively only the south, but until 1946 administrative direction came from Bangui in Oubangui-Chari rather than N'Djamena. Unlike northern and central Chad, a French colonial system of direct civilian administration was set up among the Sara, a southern ethnic group, and their neighbors. Also, unlike the rest of Chad, a modest level of economic development occurred in the south because of the introduction in 1929 of large-scale cotton production. Remittances and pensions to southerners who served in the French military also enhanced economic well-being.

But even the advantages of more income, schools, and roads failed to win popular support for the French in the south. In addition to earlier grievances, such as forced porterage (which claimed thousands of lives) and village relocation, southern farmers resented the mandatory quotas for the production of cotton, which France purchased at artificially low prices. Government-protected chiefs further abused this situation. The chiefs were resented all the more because they were generally the artificial creations of the French in a region of previously stateless societies. This commonality of treatment and the colonial organizational framework began to create during this period a sense of Sara ethnicity among persons whose collective identities had previously been limited to small kinship groups.

Although France had put forth considerable effort during the conquest of Chad, the ensuing administration of the territory was halfhearted. Officials in the French colonial service resisted assignments to Chad, so posts often went to novices or to out-of-favor officials. One historian of France's empire has concluded that it was almost impossible to be too demented or depraved to be considered unfit for duty in Chad. Still, major scandals occurred periodically, and many of the posts remained vacant. In 1928, for example, 42% of the Chadian subdivisions lacked official administrators.

An event occurred in 1935 that was to have far-reaching consequences throughout the 1970s and 1980s. In that year, the French colonial administration negotiated a border adjustment with Italy, Libya's colonial master. The adjustment would have relocated the Libyan-Chad boundary about 100 kilometers south across the Aozou Strip. Although the French legislature never ratified the agreement, the negotiations formed part of the basis of Libya's claim to the area decades later.

== Félix Eboué ==
In 1940 Chad became internationally prominent when its lieutenant governor, Félix Eboué, led the rest of the French Equatorial African (AEF) federation to support Free France under Charles de Gaulle rather than the government of Vichy France. Chad became the base for Colonel Jacques Leclerc's conquest of the Fezzan (1940–1943), and the entire episode became the basis of an enduring sentimental bond between Chad and the France of de Gaulle's generation. More funds and attention flowed to Chad than ever before, and Eboué became the governor general of the entire AEF in November 1940.

Born in French Guiana of mixed African and European parentage, Eboué was keenly interested in the problems of cultural dislocation resulting from unchecked modernization in Africa. He worked to return authority to authentic traditional leaders while training them in modern administrative techniques. He recognized a place for African middle-class professionals in cities, but he opposed the migration of workers to cities, supporting instead the creation of integrated rural industries where workers could remain with their families. When Eboué died in 1944, the AEF lost a major source of progressive ideas, and Chad lost a leader with considerable influence in France.

== Territorial assembly under France ==
French voters rejected many of the progressive ideas of Eboué and others after World War II ended. Nevertheless, the constitution that was approved in 1946 granted Chad and other African colonies the right to elect a territorial assembly with limited powers. The Assembly, in turn, elected delegates to the French General Council of all the AEF. The position of governor-general was redesignated high commissioner, and each territory gained the right to elect representatives to French parliamentary bodies, including the National Assembly, the Council of the Republic, and the Assembly of the French Union. The African peoples became French citizens, and the colonies were designated overseas territories of France. But the real locus of authority remained in Paris, also because the 1946 reforms had sanctioned the existence of a dual college system for voting, with one reserved for the Europeans in Chad; the Africans could only vote for the collège des autochthones. French personnel continued to dominate the AEF's administration. No formal attempt was made to train Chadian Africans for civil service positions before 1955. On the bright side, the 1946 reforms abolished forced labour.

== Local politics ==
Until the early 1950s, political forces originating in France dominated the development of politics in Chad. Local elections were won largely by members of the Chadian Democratic Union (Union Démocratique Tchadienne or UDT), founded in 1946, which was associated with a political party in France, the Gaullist Rally of the French People. The UDT represented French commercial interests and a bloc of traditional leaders, the latter composed primarily of Muslim and Ouaddaïan nobility. Chad's European community initiated the practice of using the civil service for partisan political ends; African civil servants who were identified with organizations opposed to the UDT soon found themselves dismissed or transferred to distant posts. For example, François Tombalbaye (later to become president) lost his job as a teacher and ended up making bricks by hand because of his union activities and his role in the opposition Chadian Progressive Party (Parti Progressiste Tchadien or PPT).

Meanwhile, increased exploitation of cotton farmers led to tensions and violent outbursts against the chiefs who served as middlemen. In 1952, protests by farmers in Bébalem (in the aftermath of the disputed local elections which the French authorities announced had been won by the UDT) gave way to the Bébalem massacre carried out by the colonial authorities.

By 1953, the PPT was emerging as the major rival of the UDT. Gabriel Lisette, its leader, was a black colonial administrator born in Panama and posted to Chad in 1946. Elected as a deputy to the French National Assembly, Lisette was later chosen as secretary general of the inter-territorial African Democratic Rally, a big tent anticolonial party. The PPT originated as a territorial branch of the RDA and rapidly became the political vehicle of the country's non-Muslim intellectuals. Traditional rulers perceived the PPT to be antithetical to their interests and recognized that the local territorial assembly could adversely affect their revenue and power. These factors persuaded traditional rulers to become more active in the UDT, which, because of internal divisions, had changed its name in the late 1950s to the Chadian Social Action (Action Sociale Tchadienne or AST).

While the PPT was a relatively moderate party and its founder Gabriel Lisette was close to Félix Houphouët-Boigny, it was much more radical than the UDT. It had grown into an important opponent of the colonial administration, helping to organize trade union opposition in the Cotonfran factories.

Although party names changed frequently and dramatic factional schisms occurred throughout the 1950s, electoral competition was essentially between three political blocs: the UDT [AST], the PPT, and the allies of Ahmed Koulamallah from Chari-Baguirmi and Kanem prefectures. A clever politician and charismatic leader of the Tijaniyya Islamic brotherhood in Chad, Koulamallah campaigned in different times and places as a member of the Baguirmi nobility (he was an estranged son of the sultan), a radical socialist leader, or a militant Muslim fundamentalist. As a result, politics in the 1950s was a struggle between the south, which mostly supported the PPT, and the Muslim sahelian belt, which favored the UDT [AST]. Koulamallah played a generally disruptive role in the middle.

== Greater autonomy ==
In 1956, the French National Assembly passed the loi cadre (enabling act), known as Overseas Reform Act, which resulted in greater self-rule for Chad and other African territories. Electoral reforms expanded the pool of eligible voters, and power began to shift from the sparsely settled northern and central Chadian regions toward the more densely populated south. The PPT had become less militant, winning the support of chiefs in the south and members of the French colonial administration, but not that of private French commercial interests. In the 1957 elections, held on 31 March, out of 65 seats, the PPT took 32; its allies, the Chadian Independent Socialist Party (PSIT) and the UDT, took 15; the Chadian Independents and Agrarians Rally (GIRT), an offshoot of the AST, 9; the AST, 8 and the last seat went to an independent candidate. As a result of this victory, Lisette and the PPT formed the first African government in Chad. He maintained a majority for only about a year, however, before factions representing traditional chiefs withdrew their support from his coalition government.

== French federation versus full independence ==
In September 1958, voters in all of Africa's French territories took part in a referendum on the Fifth Republic's constitution, drawn up under de Gaulle. For a variety of political and economic reasons, most of Chad's political groups supported the new constitution, and all voted for a resolution calling for Chad to become an autonomous republic within the French Community. The three other AEF territories voted similarly, and in November 1958 the AEF was officially terminated. Coordination on such issues as customs and currency continued among the four territories through written agreements or on an ad hoc basis. Nonetheless, some Chadians supported the creation of an even stronger French federation, rather than independence. The leading proponent of this proposal was Barthélemy Boganda of Oubangui-Chari, but his death in 1959 and the vigorous opposition of Gabon resulted in political independence on a separate basis for all four republics.

After Lisette's coalition crumbled in early 1959, two other alliances governed briefly. Then in March, the PPT returned to power, this time under the leadership of Tombalbaye, a union leader and representative from Moyen-Chari Prefecture. Lisette, whose power was undermined because of his non-African origins, became deputy Prime Minister in charge of economic coordination and international relations. Tombalbaye soon consolidated enough political support from the south and north to isolate the opposition into a collection of conservative Muslim leaders from central Chad. The latter group formed a political party in January 1960, but its parliamentary representation steadily dropped as Tombalbaye wooed individual members to the PPT. By independence in August 1960, the PPT and the south had clearly achieved dominance, but Tombalbaye's political skills made it possible for observers to talk optimistically about the possibility of building a broad-based coalition of political forces.

== See also ==
- Aozou Strip
- Ubangi-Shari
- Félix Éboué
