= Cotton production in Chad =

Cotton is an important crop to the economy of Chad.

== History ==
Cotton is an indigenous crop to southern Chad. In 1910, the French colonial administration organized market production on a limited scale under the direction of the military governor. By 1920, the colonial administration was promoting the large-scale production of cotton for export. The French saw cotton as the only exploitable resource for the colony and as an effective means of introducing a cash economy into the area. Indeed, the elaboration of colonial administration went hand in hand with the extension of cotton production throughout the region.

France's motives were clear: it sought to ensure a source of raw materials for its home industries and a protected market for its exports abroad. France also intended that taxes derived from commercial ventures within the colonies would offset the expenses of the colonial administration. Therefore, customs duties on cotton exports from Chad, then a part of French Equatorial Africa, were paid to the governor general at Brazzaville (in contemporary Congo), as were duties on exports from other colonies under regional administration. Revenues from a head tax were paid in cash locally and went directly to the lieutenant governor of the colony. Not surprisingly, virtually the only means of earning the money to pay the tax was by the sale of cotton to the French.

In 1928, exploitation of cotton within the colony was placed in the hands of Cotonfran, a private company. Under the terms of the contract between the colonial administration and Cotonfran, the administration maintained a certain quantity of production by the villages, and Cotonfran bought at least 80% of that production. The cotton was ginned locally, but no further transformation was permitted; all the cotton fiber was then exported to France.

The colonial administration fixed the quantity of cotton produced and the price paid to the peasant producer on the basis of calculations furnished by Cotonfran of costs and expectations for the price of cotton on the world market. France reorganized village administration by replacing traditional chiefs with individuals more amenable to the colonial power, which assured the proper cultivation of the cotton crop and the collection of taxes. This system included forced labor and the subordination of growing food crops to cotton.

The cotton production rose from 17 tonnes in 1929 to 80.500 tonnes in 1957. This created an increasingly large divide between impoverished rural labourers on the one hand and the powerful chiefs and middlemen who pocketed most of the profits on the other. According to René Lemarchand, "the parastatal agency responsible for the production quotas, the Cotonfran, came to be regarded by the peasant masses as prime symbol of corporate and chiefly ruthlessness". Moreover, the French administration's focus on cotton led to a decrease in food production and even to famines in some areas.

These conditions led to tensions and occasional violent outbursts against the chiefs. In 1952, protests by cotton farmers in Bébalem (in the aftermath of the disputed local elections) led to the Bébalem massacre carried out by the colonial authorities.

== Production ==
In 1988, the entirety of Chad's cotton was produced in the five soudanian prefectures of Mayo-Kebbi, Tandjilé, Logone Occidental, Logone Oriental, and Moyen-Chari, plus the Bousso region of Chari-Baguirmi Prefecture, which juts down into the soudanian zone. Few regions outside these prefectures offered sufficient water and population to sustain cotton production. Moreover, in this land of difficult transport, areas producing a cash crop also needed to be able to grow enough food for their people. Typically, the cultivation of cotton and food crops was carried on side by side. Efforts to extend the cultivation of cotton to the neighboring sahelian prefectures of Salamat and Guéra have had little success. In 1983 and 1984, with production at its highest in a decade, these two prefectures represented only .005% of total production. Suggestions also have been made from time to time to bring cotton production to the fertile borders of Lake Chad. Trials have shown the high yields possible there, estimated at 3,000 to 4,000 kilograms per hectare. As of 1987, however, farmers in the Lake Chad area had not taken voluntarily to cotton production. Traditionally, farmers have resisted government efforts to control local production of such crops as wheat, and the history of coercion and government intervention associated with cotton was no inducement.

The government has introduced methods to increase crop yield, which include the expanded use of fertilizers and insecticides. Even so, compared with crop yields of more than 1,000 kilograms per hectare for other francophone West African states (such as Cameroon, Mali, and Côte d'Ivoire), until 1982 Chad's crop yields did not significantly exceed 500 kilograms per hectare; from 1983 to 1987, yields averaged almost 750 kilograms per hectare.

Area under cotton cultivation reached a peak in 1963 of 3,389 square kilometres. From 1963 until the end of the 1970s, the area under cotton cultivation averaged 2,750 square kilometres. In the 1980s, however, the area has been consistently less than 2,000 square kilometres. By 1983 the area of land under cotton cultivation had dropped by 36% from the average during the 1960s and 1970s. Several sources estimated the area in southern Chad under cotton cultivation at 30 to 40% of all land in cultivation, and in some areas of Mayo-Kebbi Prefecture, it may have been higher.

Cotton production has exhibited wide swings. Factors such as climatic conditions, production prices, and civil strife have influenced production. The first crop to exceed 100,000 tons came in 1963, but the 1970s were the best years for production, which from 1971 to 1978 remained well above 100,000 tons per year. Chad reached its all-time record production in 1975. Production suffered from 1979 to 1982 because of the Chadian Civil War and hit a twenty-year low in 1981. In 1983, with the return of some political stability and higher market prices, production improved but then fell from 1984 to 1987, a reflection of declining world cotton prices.

Once the crop is harvested, the producers must sort the cotton to separate lower quality yellow cotton from higher quality white cotton. Since the late 1970s, the proportion of white cotton generally has been 90% or more of total production. Going back to the 1960s, the quality of Chadian cotton had been consistently high, except for 1972 and 1973, when the proportion of yellow cotton rose to 18%. Since 1980 the quality has remained high at initial sorting, with white cotton representing more than 95% of the crop and accounting for 98% of production in 1984.

Cotton production was 142.000 ton in 2014, 180.000 ton in 2015, 150.000 in 2016.

== Administration ==
In 1989, the official structure responsible for the production and marketing of cotton was composed of the ONDR under the Ministry of Agriculture and Rural Development, of Cotontchad, and of the Cotton Price Stabilization Board (Caisse de Stabilisation des Prix du Coton—CSPC). Founded in 1965, the ONDR was originally given responsibility to monitor, improve, and assist all agricultural production. By the mid-1980s, however, the government's emphasis on cotton production made the ONDR an important factor for the cotton industry only. Cotontchad, successor to Cotonfran, was founded as a parastatal company in 1971 to collect, buy, gin, transport, and export the cotton crop. The company also had responsibility for elements of the small national textile, soap, and edible oil industries. The CSPC's task was to stabilize prices paid to peasant producers by funding operating losses incurred by Cotontchad. Assuring a constant price to the producer not only helped maintain a certain level of production for Cotontchad but also limited costs to the company by holding down producer prices. The ONDR, the CSPC, Cotontchad, and the government itself were involved in determining producer prices. In addition, the CSPC supported the program to improve yields. Between 1971 and 1983, an estimated 57% of all payments by the CSPC were made in conjunction with the program to improve cotton production.

Other major actors in the cotton industry were the private banks, the French Textile Development Company (Compagnie Française pour le Développement des Textiles--CFDT), and French and EC institutions, as well as the World Bank. Private banks provided the credits necessary to Cotontchad and to the peasants to finance the opening of each planting season and especially to provide capital for the import and distribution of fertilizers and insecticides. The CFDT marketed Chad's cotton on the world market. The CFDT also contributed to the smooth operation of Cotontchad through technical agreements to maintain equipment and to provide expertise in improving cropping methods through the ONDR. In addition, the CFDT supported research carried out by the Cotton and Textile Research Institute (Institut de Recherche sur le Coton et les Textiles—IRCT), a small public research facility located near Doba. Subsidies to Chad's cotton production under the Lomé Convention were paid through the Stabex system of the EEC. Those funds were channeled to the CSPC for price support to the producers. The CSPC also received portions of funds needed to assure payments to producers from Cotontchad as well as from the central government. Between 1971 and 1983, virtually all income to the CSPC derived from rebates paid by Cotontchad into the system.

After 1984, the system became far more dependent on external sources of funds (such as Stabex) because of sharply reduced income to Cotontchad. In addition to Stabex, the EC's European Development Fund (EDF) contributed directly to the program of improving yields. French assistance remained crucial to the system. The Caisse Centrale de Coopération Economique (CCCE) was a shareholder in Cotontchad, and the other arm of French foreign aid, the Cooperation and Aid Fund (Fonds d'Aide et de la Coopération—FAC), directed assistance to the southern zone in support of the cotton complex. FAC also provided direct assistance to the government, which, among other things, helped pay the salaries of officials and functionaries, especially those in the ONDR.

== Pricing ==
Prices paid to Chad's cotton producers, the peasants of the southern soudanian zone, have risen slowly over the years. The structure included separate prices for white cotton and for yellow cotton. From 1971, when the distinction arose, to 1978, the price for white cotton was CFA F50 per kilogram and stayed at this level during much of the period of heavy civil conflict until 1982. From 1982 to 1985, the price increased steeply to CFA F100 per kilogram, at which point it had leveled by 1987, despite downward pressure because of the fall in world prices and a new program of cost reductions by Cotontchad under World Bank direction. The price paid for yellow cotton has not kept pace with this rise, reaching only CFA F40 per kilogram in 1983, where it remained through 1987.

The price paid to the producer traditionally has not covered actual production costs, either for the peasant or for Cotontchad. As much as 50% of the costs of production has been borne by outside donors, primarily from the EDF, through the Stabex system. Between 1981 and 1984, the EDF financed between 70 and 80% of the costs of the program to improve yields, largely through subsidies to the CSPC for price support and subsidies for Cotontchad in the initial purchase of insecticides and fertilizers. The costs of improvements have been reimbursed only partially from payments made by producers through the ONDR.

== Restructuring the system ==
By 1987, because world prices were still insufficient to recoup costs, Cotontchad was rapidly going broke. In the mid-1980s, annual net losses were estimated at CFA F18 billion. Net losses per kilogram of ginned cotton were estimated at CFA F453 in 1985 and CFA F298 in 1987. These figures stood in contrast to 1984, when there was a net profit of CFA F193 per kilogram. Cotontchad's position was not expected to improve unless the world price of cotton reached the CFA F600-per-kilogram range.

With World Bank backing and support from France, the Netherlands, and the EC, restructuring of Cotontchad began in 1986 with government implementation of the Emergency Cotton Program. At the producer level, the program called for freezing the price paid producers at the CFA F100-per-kilogram level through 1988 and studying new methods of fixing producer prices to reflect world market conditions. Subsidies on improved inputs, such as fertilizer and insecticides, were eliminated as of 1987, with producers assuming the costs. Cotton production was to be limited to about 100,000 tons by restricting the area under production to 750 square kilometres during the program period. At the company level, Cotontchad sold nonessential assets to the private sector (including two aircraft and about 150 vehicles), closed its branch office in Bangui, Central African Republic, and laid off administrative staff. It also closed six ginneries and reduced the number of cotton collection centers in accordance with the production target of 100,000 tons. For its part, the government exempted Cotontchad from taxes, particularly export duties, and suspended its contributions to the CSPC, the ONDR, and the Debt Amortization Fund (Caisse Autonome d'Amortissement—CAA). Staffs at the CSPC and the ONDR were reduced, and the roles of both organizations were reviewed.
