= Christianity in Chad =

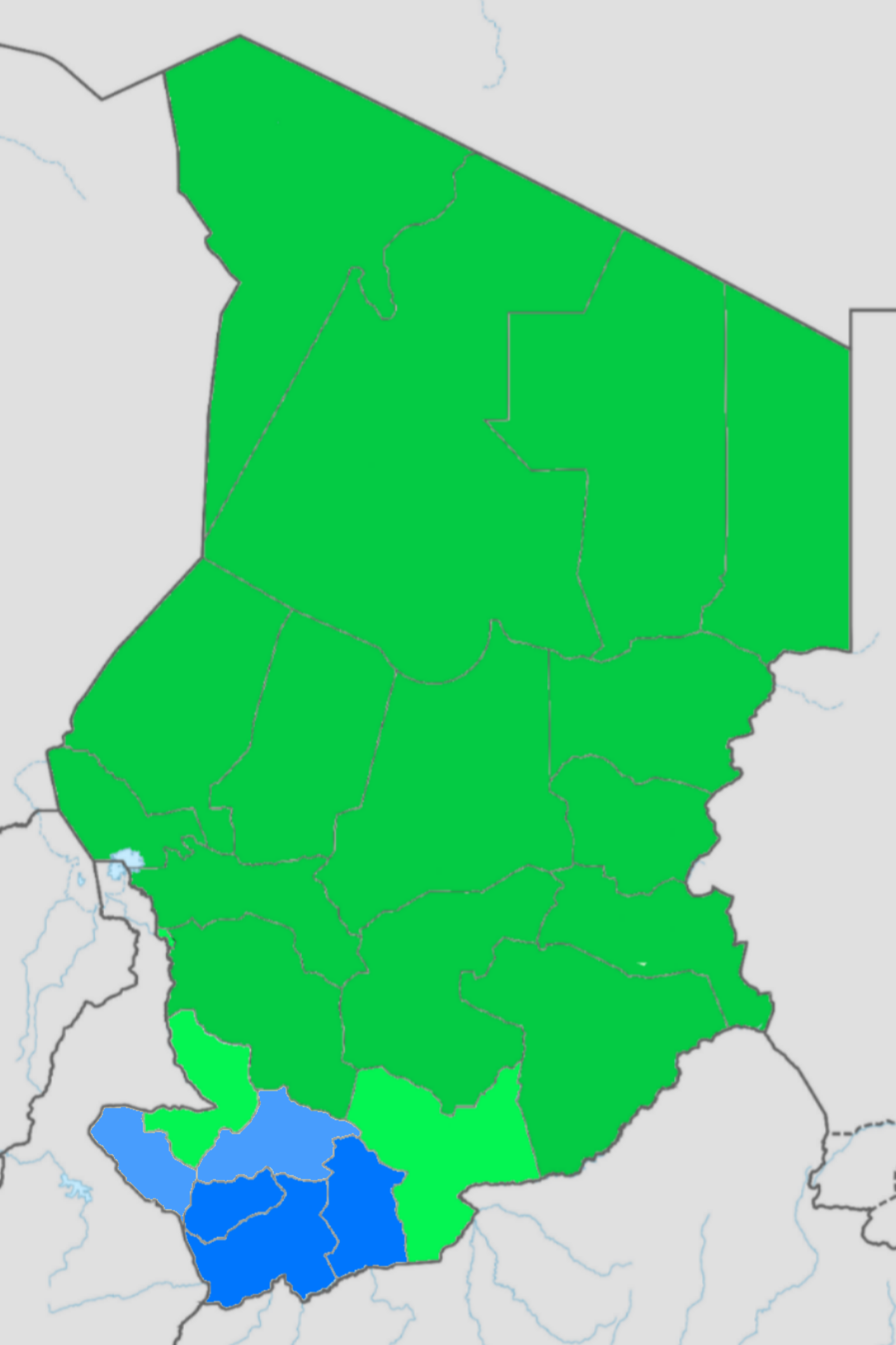
Religions in Chad by region: Christianity and traditional religions (blue: mostly, light blue: plurality), while Islam (green: mostly, light green: plurality).

Christianity in Chad arrived more recently than other religions, with the arrival of Europeans. Its followers are divided into Roman Catholics and Protestants (including several denominations) and collectively represent 45% of the country's population.

== Protestantism ==
The Protestants came to southern Chad in the 1920s. The American organization Baptist Mid-Missions was the first Protestant mission to settle in the country in 1925 in Sarh. Missionaries of other denominations and nationalities soon followed. Many of the American missions were northern offshoots of missionary networks founded farther south in the Ubangi-Chari colony (now Central African Republic) of French Equatorial Africa (Afrique Equatoriale Franchise — AEF). The organizational ties between the missions in southern Chad and Ubangi-Chari were strengthened by France's decision in 1925 to transfer Logone Occidental, Tandjilé, Logone Oriental, and Moyen-Chari prefectures to Ubangi-Chari, where they remained until another administrative shuffle restored them to Chad in 1932.

In 1964, the Chadian Association of Baptist Churches was officially founded.

These early Protestant establishments looked to their own churches for material resources and to their own countries for diplomatic support. Such independence allowed them to maintain a distance from the French colonial administration. In addition, the missionaries arrived with their wives and children, and they often spent their entire lives in the region. Some of the missionaries who arrived at that time had grown up with missionary parents in missions founded earlier in the French colonies to the south. Many remained after independence, leaving only in the early and or mid-1970s when Tombalbaye's authenticité movement forced their departure.

The missionaries set up schools, clinics, and hospitals long before the colonial administration did. In fact, the mission schools produced the first Western-educated Chadians in the 1940s and 1950s. In general, the Protestant missionary effort in southern Chad has enjoyed some success. In 1980, after a half-century of evangelization, Protestants in southern Chad numbered about 80,000.

From bases in the south, Protestants founded missions in other parts of Chad. In the colonial capital of Fort-Lamy (present-day's N'Djamena), the missions attracted followers among resident southerners. The missionaries also worked among the non-Muslim populations of Guéra, Ouaddaï, and Biltine prefectures. There were estimated to be 18,000 Christians in N'Djamena in 1980.

== Roman Catholicism ==
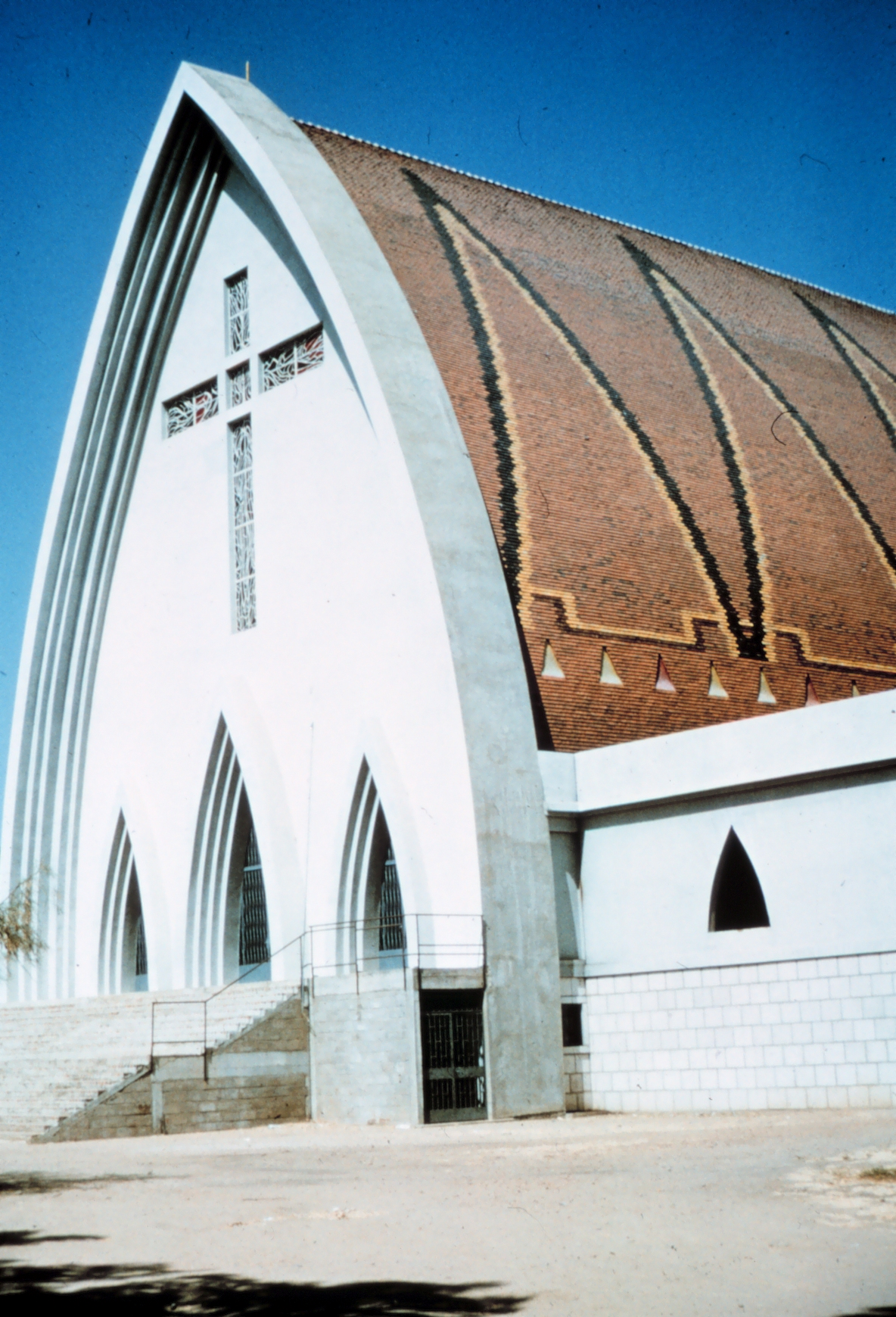
The cathedral in N'Djamena, Chad, as it was before it was severely damaged during the civil war

Catholic presence is first recorded in 1663 through the work of Capuchin Franciscans, anteceding Protestant missions by more than 200 years, although permanent missions came to Chad later than their Protestant counterparts. Isolated missional efforts began as early as 1929 when The Holy Ghost Fathers from Bangui founded a mission at Kou, near Moundou in Logone Occidental Prefecture. In 1934, in the midst of the sleeping sickness epidemic, they abandoned Kou for Doba in Logone Oriental Prefecture. Other priests from Ubangi-Shari and Cameroon opened missions in Kélo and Sarh in 1935 and 1939, respectively.

In 1946 these autonomous missions gave way to an institutionalized Roman Catholic presence. This late date had more to do with European politics than with events in Chad. Earlier in the century, the Vatican had designated the Chad region to be part of the Italian vicarate of Khartoum. Rather than risk the implantation of Italian missionaries during the era of Italian dictator Benito Mussolini, the French administration discouraged all Roman Catholic missionary activity. For its part, the Vatican adopted the same tactic, not wishing to upset the Italian regime by transferring jurisdiction of the Chad region to the French. As a consequence of their defeat in World War II, however, the Italians lost their African colonies. This loss cleared the way for a French Roman Catholic presence in Chad, which a decree from Rome formalized on March 22, 1946.

This decree set up three religious jurisdictions that eventually became four bishoprics. The first, administered by the Jesuits, had its seat in N'Djamena. Although its jurisdiction included the eight prefectures in the northern and eastern parts of the country, almost all the Roman Catholics in sahelian and Saharan Chad lived in the capital. The diocese of N'Djamena also served as the archdiocese of all Chad. The second bishopric, at Sarh, also was delegated to the Jesuits. Its region included Salamat and Moyen-Chari prefectures. The third and fourth jurisdictions had their headquarters in Pala and Moundou and were delegated to the Oblats de Marie and Capuchin orders. The Pala bishopric served Mayo-Kebbi Prefecture, while the bishopric of Moundou was responsible for missions in Logone Occidental and Logone Oriental prefectures. By far the most important jurisdiction in 1970, Pala included 116,000 of Chad's 160,000 Catholics.

The relatively slow progress of the Roman Catholic Church in Chad has several causes. Although Roman Catholicism has been much more open to local cultures than Protestantism, the doctrine of celibacy probably has deterred candidates for the priesthood. Insistence on monogamy also has undoubtedly made the faith less attractive to some potential converts, particularly wealthy older men able to afford more than one wife.

The social works of the Roman Catholic Church have made it an important institution in Chad. Like their Protestant counterparts, the Roman Catholic missions have a history of social service. In the 1970s, along with priests, the staffs of most establishments included brothers and nuns who worked in the areas of health, education, and development. Many of the nuns were trained medical professionals who served on the staffs of government hospitals and clinics. It was estimated that 20,000 Chadians attended Roman Catholic schools in 1980. Adult literacy classes also reached beyond the traditional school-aged population. In the area of development, as early as the 1950s Roman Catholic missions in southern Chad set up rural development centers whose clientele included non-Christians as well as Christians.

In 2020 the Apostolic Vicariate of Mongo received its first native Chadian bishop, Philippe Abbo Chen. In an interview with Catholic charity Aid to the Church in Need, bishop Chen described the faithful of his vicariate as a "small flock of Christians in the desert" and said that although Christians were sometimes wary to demonstrate their faith publicly, the Church generally operated without legal restrictions. He added that some young Muslim clerics were being radicalised during training in Sudan, and that this was a concern for the future.

== Demographics ==
Religious affiliation in Chad
Affiliation	1993 Census	1996-97 DHS Survey (Note: The DHS Surveys of 1996-97 and 2004 sampled women ages 15-49 and men ages 15-59.)	2004 DHS Survey	2009 Census	2010 Malaria Survey (Note: The 2010 Malaria Survey only sampled women ages 15-49.)	2010 Pew Forum Estimates	2014-15 DHS Survey (Note: The DHS Survey of 2014-15 sampled women and men ages 15-49.)	2020 Pew Research Center Projections	2020 The ARDA Estimate	2021 ACN International Estimate
Muslim	53.1%	54.6%	55.7%	58%	53.6%	55.7%	52.1%	55.1%	56.3%	57.5%
Christian	34.3%	38.9%	40.0%	34%	43.0%	40.0%	44.1%	41.1%	35.2%	34.8%
Catholic	20.1%	22.6%	22.4%	18%	-	22.5%	20%	-	15.6%	-
Protestant	14.2%	16.3%	17.6%	16%		17.6%	23.9%	-	7.8%	-
Other Christians	-	-	-	-	-	-	0.2%	-	11.8%	-
Animist	7.3%	2.9%	4.3%	8%	3.4%	-	0.3%	1.3%	7.6%	6.7%
Other	0.5%	3.5%	4.3%	-	3.4%	-	-	0.1%	0.8%	1%
Unknown	1.7%	3.5%	4.3%	-	3.4%	-	0.7%	0.1%	-	1%
None	3.1%	3.5%	4.3%	-	3.4%	-	2.8%	2.4%	0.1%	1%
