= Negue Djogo =

Chadian officer and politician

Negue Djogo (February 2, 1932 - 1995) was a Chadian officer and politician.

A French-trained Sara Catholic officer, his first prominent assignment came in 1966 when, still a lieutenant, he was made by President François Tombalbaye prefect of the key Bourkou-Ennedi-Tibesti (BET) region, which France, Chad's former colonial power, had evacuated only in 1964, four years after the independence of the country. He was among those accused of misrule by the French Administrative Reform Mission (MRA) in 1969, for his contempt of Muslim traditions and especially of the dia, the blood wealth.

All the same, under Tombalbaye Djogo made a fast career and became general and Chief of Staff of the Chadian Armed Forces (FAT), when he was arrested by the President on March 23, 1975, in what was yet another of many purges in the army. He did not remain long in jail: on April 13 a military coup removed Tombalbaye. Immediately freed from jail, the coupists offered him the presidency of the new military junta, but when he declined they asked Félix Malloum, who on April 15 assumed the position of new head of state of the country. Djogo took the office of minister of finance.

Malloum's military government crumbled in 1979 when the Prime Minister Hissène Habré, a former Muslim warlord, broke with the President on February 12 and attacked the capital N'Djamena with his militia, the Armed Forces of the North (FAN). The army's Head of staff, general Nguemourou, reacted weakly and finally resigned the command to Djogo on February 14. His authority was early contested by the colonel Wadel Abdelkader Kamougué, the head of the gendarmerie, the military police, which was the sole unit of the army that did not disintegrate in the battle; and when the FAT, defeated, left the capital for Southern Chad on April 15, Kamougué was in command while Djogo remained at N'Djamena.

The rift was becoming evident already in the second peace conference held at Kano in Nigeria between April 3 and April 11, when all factions were invited to form a Transitional Government of National Unity (GUNT). Djogo was able to eclipse here Kamougué, and as a result Djogo was nominated Vice President of the new government sworn in on April 29, as representative of the FAT. President became Lol Mohamed Shawa, a protégé of Nigeria, Habré Defense Minister and Goukouni Oueddei Interior Minister. Djogo was also proclaimed commander-in-chief of the new armed forces that were to unite the old FAT and the militias.

The government did not live long, principally for the exclusion from the GUNT of important Libya-supported militias, which promptly formed a counter-government, the Democratic Revolutionary Council (CDR), led by Ahmat Acyl. Also, many countries refused to recognize the new government: Djogo experimented this personally at the 6th Franco-African Summit held at Kigali on May 21 and May 22. Djogo had been entrusted with leading the Chadian delegation at the summit, when doubt on the GUNT's representativity voiced by a number of delegates brought to the abrupt departure of the Chadians.

Bye mid-summer it was clear that the end of Shawa's government was at hand. Nigeria opened new rounds of negotiation for the formation of a more comprehensive government; after a first failure, the second conference held at Lagos was more successful, and all factions, including the CDR, signed the Lagos Accord on August 21. As a result, o new GUNT was formed on September 3, with Goukouni as new president and Kamougué as vice president.

Djogo tried to politically reemerge by attacking Kamougué. The occasion came on March 1, 1980, when he promoted in N'Djamena a manifesto for the formation a unitarian decentralized state, but he obtained little support for it, mainly some officers that had not followed Kamougué in 1979 and also some functionaries tied to the former Tombalbaye Regime.

When Habré, who had broken with the GUNT in 1980, conquered N'Djamena in 1982 and made himself new president, the other northern factions of the GUNT refused to surrender and reunited their forces in the BET Prefecture. While Goukouni remained its president, its military forces were united under the command of Djogo, who proved himself an able general defeating Habré's forces at Gouro and Ounianga in 1982. He was also the nominal commander of the GUNT's new army, the National Liberation Army (Armée de Libération National or ALN), which with massive Libyan man support inflicted a crushing blow to Habré's forces between June and August 1983.

In 1984 Djogo broke with the GUNT, unhappy of its internal disputes. He formed in Paris in 1985 the Democratic Front of Chad (Front Démocratique du Tchad or FDT), a coalition of groups that opposed both Goukouni and Habré. But Habré was able to win over the party in peace talks held at Libreville in Gabon under the patronage of the President Omar Bongo, which included also Alphonse Kotiga's Codos and Acheikh ibn Oumar's CAC-CDR. Djogo signed for his party on December 23, 1985. In exchange Djogo became Minister of Justice, but Habré remains in full control with his National Union for Independence and Revolution (UNIR) sole legal party. And even if Djogo insisted in a press conference held on March 4, 1986, that the FDT's goal was to restore democratic liberties, he remained unsurprisingly vague.

In mid-1988 he was shifted to the Ministry of transportation and civil aviation, and finally entered in 1989 in the Central Committee of the UNIR with other former opposition leaders. His downfall came in 1990 with the ruin of Habré, who was overthrown by Idriss Déby; from then he lost any political importance.

He died in 1995.
