= Tombalbaye government =

First Republic of Chad
- 1960–1975
- Flag Coat of arms
- Motto: "Unité, Travail, Progrès" ( French ) الاتحاد، العمل، التقدم ( Arab ) "Unity, Labour, Progress"
- Anthem: La Tchadienne (French) (The Song of Chad)
- Capital: N'Djamena
- Government: Unitary semi-presidential republic (1960-1962); Unitary one-party presidential republic under an authoritarian dictatorship (1962-1975)
- President
  - 1960-1975: François Tombalbaye
- Legislature: National Assembly
- Historical era: Decolonisation of Africa, Cold War
  - Independence from France: 11 August 1960
  - Mangalmé riots begin in Guéra: 2 September 1965
  - Chadian Civil War begins: 1 November 1965
  - 1975 Chadian coup d'état: 13–15 April 1975
- Currency: Central African CFA franc (XAF)
- ISO 3166 code: TD
Preceded by	Succeeded by
French Chad	Second Republic of Chad (1975-1982)

The Tombalbaye government, also known as the First Republic of Chad, was the government of Chad under the rule of François Tombalbaye between the country's independence in 1960 and the 1975 coup d'etat.

One of the most prominent aspects of Tombalbaye's rule to prove itself was his authoritarianism and distrust of democracy. Already in January 1962 he banned all political parties except his own PPT, and started immediately concentrating all power in his own hands. His treatment of opponents, real or imagined, was extremely harsh, filling the prisons with thousands of political prisoners.

What was even worse was his constant discrimination against the central and northern regions of Chad, where the southern Chadian administrators came to be perceived as arrogant and incompetent. This resentment at last exploded in a tax revolt on September 2, 1965 in the Guéra Prefecture, causing 500 deaths. The year after saw the birth in Sudan of the National Liberation Front of Chad (FROLINAT), created to militarily oust Tombalbaye and the Southern dominance. It was the start of a bloody civil war.

Tombalbaye resorted to calling in French troops; while moderately successful, they were not fully able to quell the insurgency. Proving more fortunate was his choice to break with the French and seek friendly ties with Libyan Brotherly Leader Gaddafi, taking away the rebels' principal source of supplies.

But while he had reported some success against the rebels, Tombalbaye started behaving more and more irrationally and brutally, continuously eroding his consensus among the southern elites, which dominated all key positions in the army, the civil service and the ruling party. As a consequence on April 13, 1975, several units of N'Djamena's gendarmerie killed Tombalbaye during a coup.

President François Tombalbaye faced a task of considerable magnitude when Chad became a sovereign state in 1960. His challenge was to build a nation out of a vast and diverse territory that had poor communications, few known resources, a tiny market, and a collection of impoverished people with sharply differing political traditions, ethnic and regional loyalties, and sociocultural patterns. The French colonial powers that had created the country's boundaries had done little to promote economic interdependence, political cooperation, or crosscultural understanding. Chadians who had hoped that the country's first president might turn out to be a state builder like the 13th century's Dabbalemi or the 16th century's Aluma were soon disappointed. During its first fifteen years, Chad under Tombalbaye experienced worsening economic conditions, eventual alienation of the most patient of foreign allies, exacerbation of ethnic and regional conflict, and grave weakening of the state as an instrument of governance.
