= Codos =

Guerrilla groups active in southern Chad from 1983 to 1986

The Codos or Commandos were guerrilla groups, active in southern Chad from 1983 to 1986, that resisted domination of their region by the President Hissène Habré's army. Many were veterans of the government army of the 1970s or Wadel Abdelkader Kamougué's Chadian Armed Forces (FAT), which had collapsed in 1982 under Habré's attacks with the short-lived Republic of Logone. Totaling as many as 15,000, they operated independently.

There were, in 1983, five codos groups. These were the Red Codos (Codos Rouge), commanded by Alphonse Kotiga, based in Moyen-Chari; the Coconut Codos (Codos Cocotieres), of Elie Atanga and Elea Djoack, in Mayo-Kebbi; the Green Codos (Codos Vert) of Pierre Tokino in Logone Oriental; the Hope Codos (Codos Espoir) of Kayer in Tandjile; and the Panther Codos (Codos Panthères) of Koulangar in Logone Occidental. They were supported by the Central African Republic, who offered them sanctuary in its borders. Habré at first attempted negotiations, making Defence minister a former leader of the codos; but when discussions broke down, the President resorted, in August 1984, to force and wide-scale fighting erupted in four of the five southern Prefectures, counting now on the support of the Central African President André Kolingba. The Chadian National Armed Forces (FANT) acted with rare brutality, destroying many villages and making itself guilty of wide-scale massacres of civilians. But it worked: in 1985, the greatest part of the south had been subdued.

The Red Codos, formed with Libyan and GUNT support, were the most effective. Kotiga exercised some influence over the other groups and was instrumental in persuading them to abandon their insurgency by promises of rewards and rehabilitation in 1985 and 1986. Many have been "recycled" by French trainers at an instructional center at Mongo, thousands of former codos (commandos) had been "recycled" by French trainers, assisted by a large cadre of Chadian military. While about 1,500 have been assimilated into the FANT, most have been organized into work brigades for service as agricultural or road laborers.
