= Kanuri people =

West and Central African ethnic group

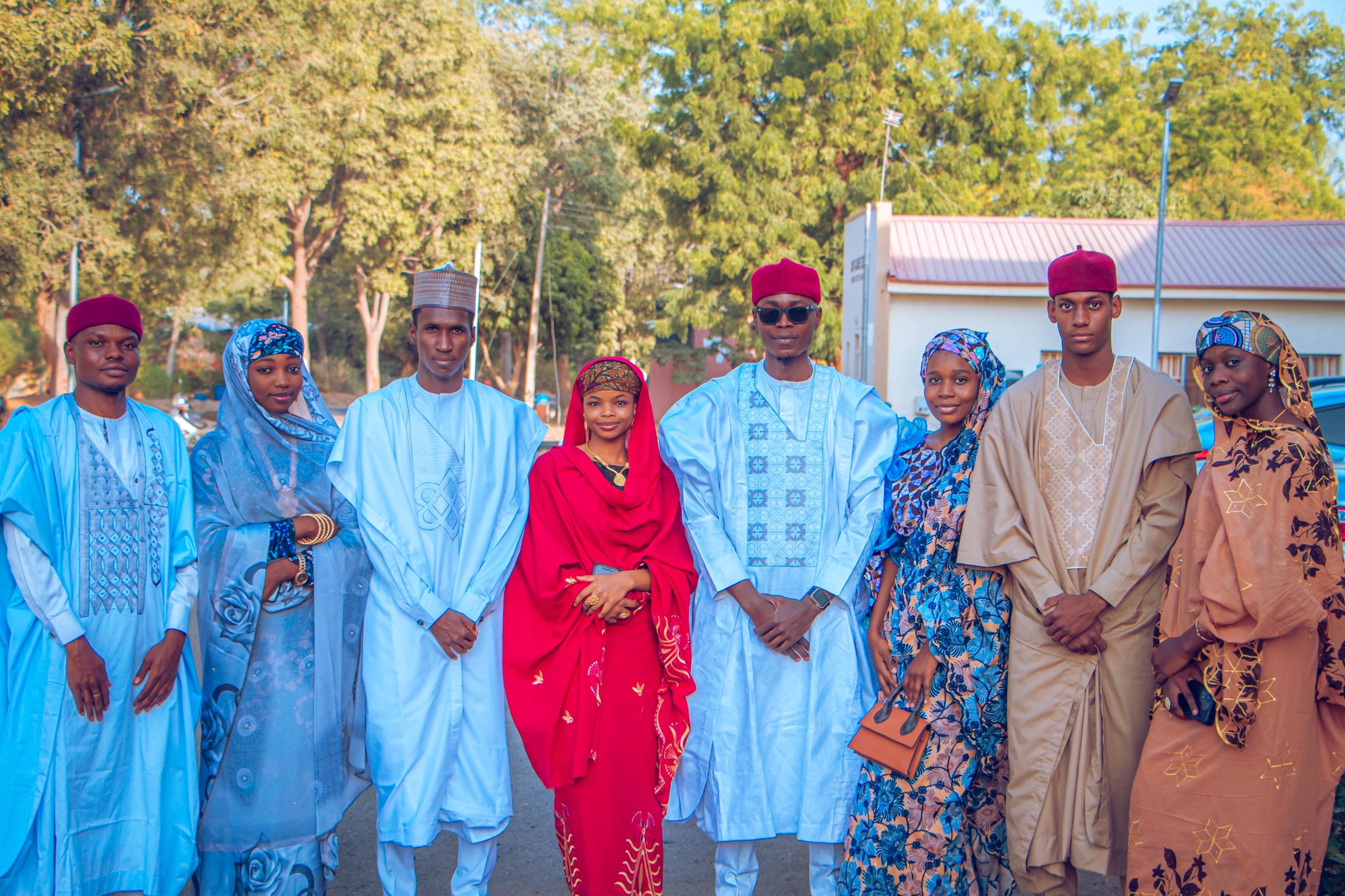
- A group of young Kanuri people

Total population
- 10,725,500

Regions with significant populations
- Nigeria, southeast Niger, western Chad, northern Cameroon and western Sudan
- Nigeria: 7,650,000 (2020); Includes Manga
- Niger: 1,500,000 (2023); Includes Manga, Yerwa, Bilma, and Tumari
- Chad: 1,071,000 (2019); Most of which are Kanembu subgroup
- Sudan: 381,000 (2022)
- Cameroon: 180,000 (2024)

Languages
- Native: Kanuri; Second Languages: Hausa (In Nigeria and Niger; Arabic (in Chad and Sudan); Nigerian English; French (in Cameroon, Chad, and Niger)

Religion
- Predominantly Sunni Islam

Related ethnic groups
- Kanembu, Zaghawa, Toubou, Nilo-Saharans

The Kanuri people (also Barnawi, Yerwa, Barebari and several other subgroup names) are an African ethnic group living largely in the lands of the former Kanem and Bornu Empires in Niger, Nigeria, Chad, and Cameroon, as well as a diaspora community residing in Sudan. Those generally termed Kanuri include several subgroups and dialect groups, some of whom identify as distinct from the Kanuri. Most trace their origins to ruling lineages of the medieval Kanem–Bornu Empire, and its client states or provinces. In contrast to the neighboring Toubou or Zaghawa pastoralists, Kanuri groups have traditionally been sedentary, engaging in farming, fishing the Chad Basin, trade, and salt processing.

== Background ==
Kanuri peoples include several subgroups, and identify by different names in some regions. The Kanuri language was the major language of the Bornu Empire and remains a major language in southeastern Niger, northeastern Nigeria and northern Cameroon, but in Chad it is limited to a handful of speakers in urban centers.

The largest population of Kanuri reside in the northeast corner of Nigeria, where the ceremonial Emirate of Bornu traces direct descent from the Kanem-Bornu empire, founded sometime before 1000 CE. Some 3 million Kanuri speakers live in Nigeria, not including some 200,000 speakers of the Manga dialect. The Nga people in Bauchi State trace their origins to a Kanuri diaspora.

In southeastern Niger, where they form the majority of the sedentary population, the Kanuri are commonly called Barebari (a Hausa name). The 400,000 Kanuri population in Niger includes the Manga subgroup, numbering some 100,000 (as at 1997) in the area east of Zinder, who regard themselves as distinct from the Barebari.

Around 40,000 (1998) members of the Tumari subgroup, sometimes called Kanembu, are a distinct Kanuri subgroup living in the N'guigmi area, and are distinct from the Chadian Kanembu people. In the Kaour escarpment oasis of eastern Niger, the Kanuri are further divided into the Bilma subgroup, numbering some 20,000 (2003), and are the dominant ethnic group in the salt evaporation and trade industry of Bilma.

Kanuri speak varieties of Kanuri, one of the Nilo-Saharan languages. Divisions include the Manga, Tumari, and Bilma dialects of Kanuri and the more distinct Kanembu language.

Inheriting the religious and cultural traditions of the Kanem-Bornu state, the Kanuri people are predominantly Sunni Muslim.

In Chad, Kanembu speakers differentiate themselves from the large Kanuri ethnicity. The Kanembu are centered in Lac Prefecture and southern Kanem Prefecture. Although Kanuri was the major language of the Bornu Empire, in Chad, Kanuri speakers are limited to handfuls of speakers in urban centers. Kanuri remains a major language in southeastern Niger, northeastern Nigeria and northern Cameroon.

In the early 1980s, the Kanembu constituted the greatest part of the population of Lac Prefecture, but some Kanembu also lived in the Chari-Baguirmi Prefecture. Once the core ethnic group of the Kanem-Borno Empire, whose territories at one time included northeastern Nigeria and southern Libya, the Kanembu retain ties beyond the borders of Chad. For example, close family and commercial ties bind them with the Kanuri of northeastern Nigeria. Within Chad, many Kanembu of Lac and Kanem prefectures identify with the Alifa of Mao, the governor of the region in precolonial times.

Originally a pastoral people, the Kanuri were one of many Nilo-Saharan groups indigenous to the Central South Sahara, beginning their expansion in the area of Lake Chad in the late 7th century, and absorbing indigenous Nilo-Saharan, Niger-Congo and Chadic (Afro-Asiatic) speakers. According to Kanuri tradition, Sef, son of Dhu Ifazan of Yemen, arrived in Kanem in the ninth century and united the population into the Sayfawa dynasty. This tradition however, is likely a product of later Islamic influence, reflecting the association with their Arabian origins in the Islamic era. Evidence of indigenous state formation in the Lake Chad area dates back to circa 800 BCE at Zilum.

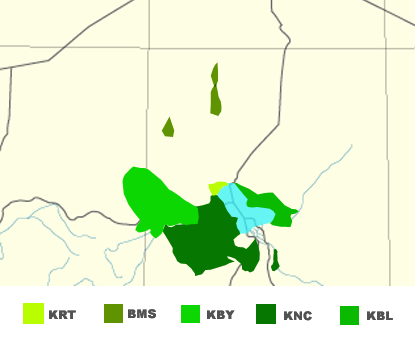
Extent of the five main Kanuri language groups today

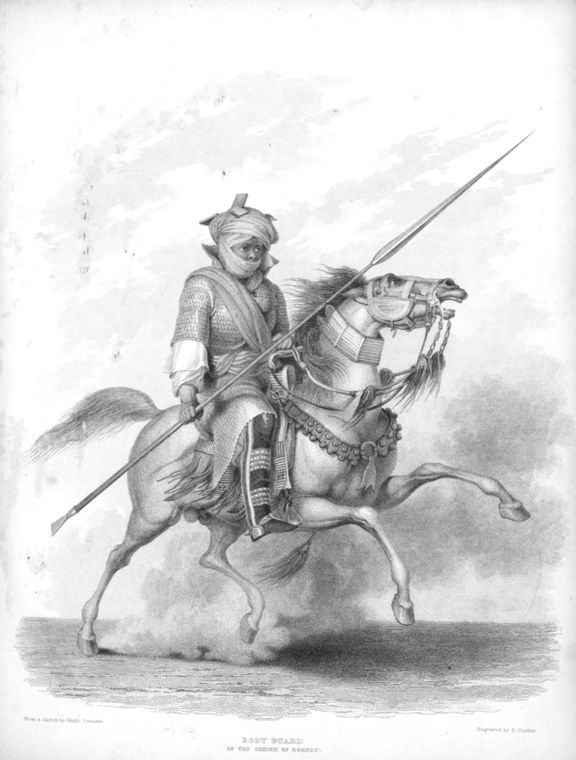
Ceremonial bodyguard of the Sheikh of Bornou in his full regalia, after a drawing by a British visitor in the 1820s. The mounted knight was central to the Bornu state, and many Kanuri people still value horsemanship and horses.

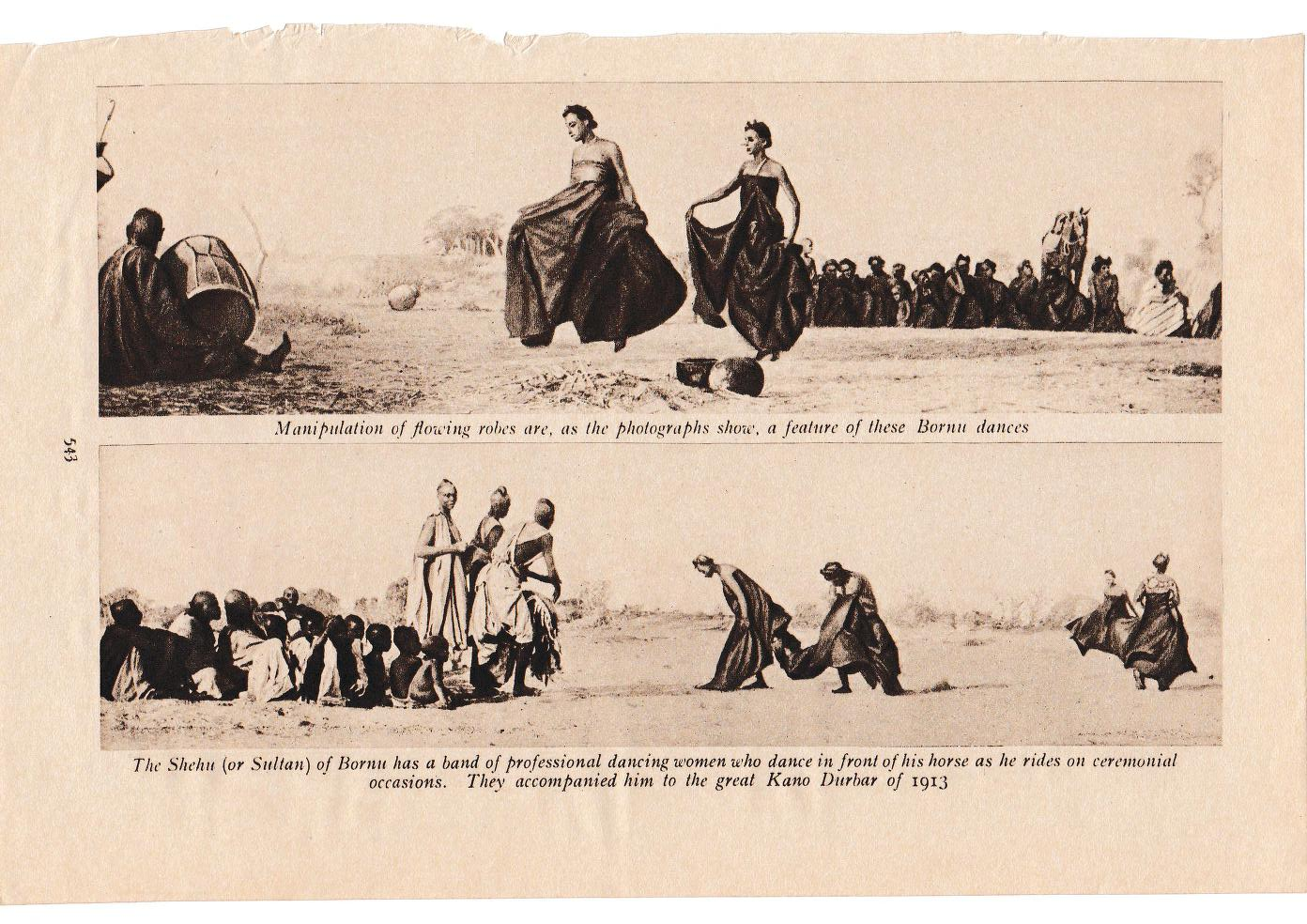
Photograph of Kanuri women dancing (1910s)

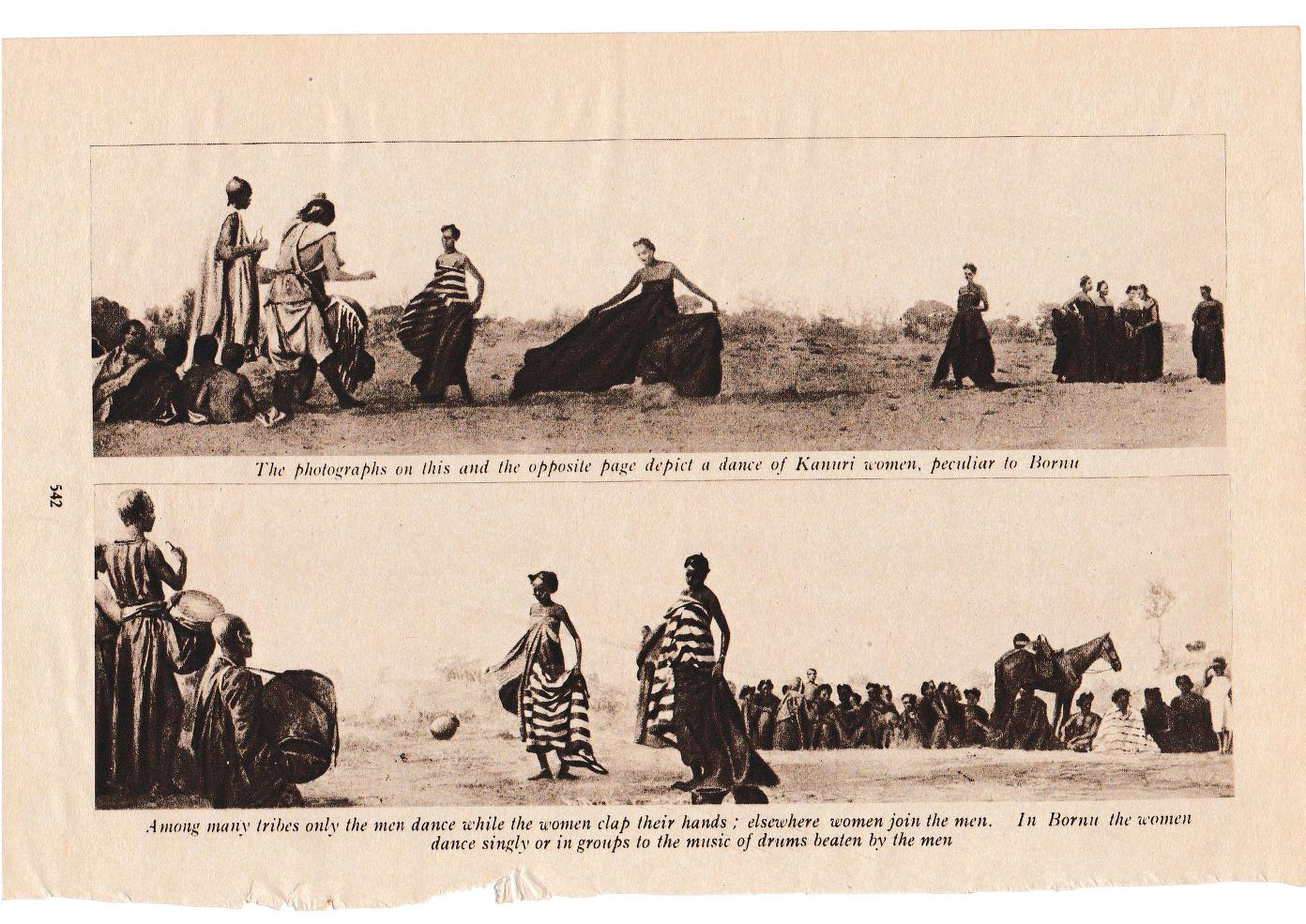
Photograph of Kanuri women dancing (1910s)

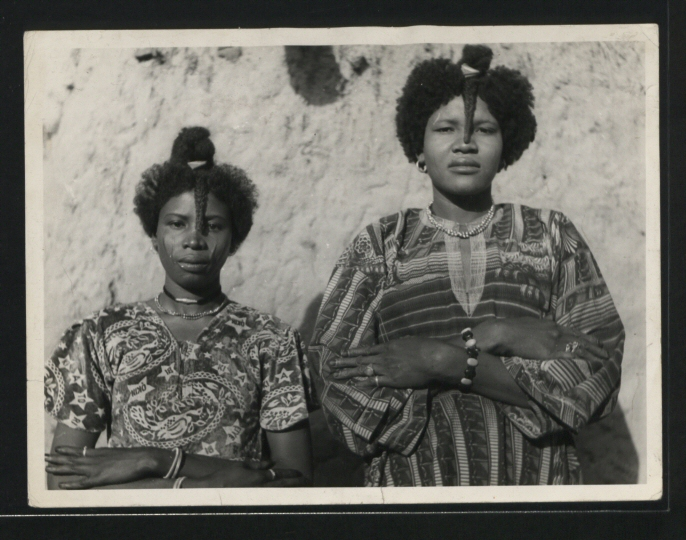
Kanuri women in 1955

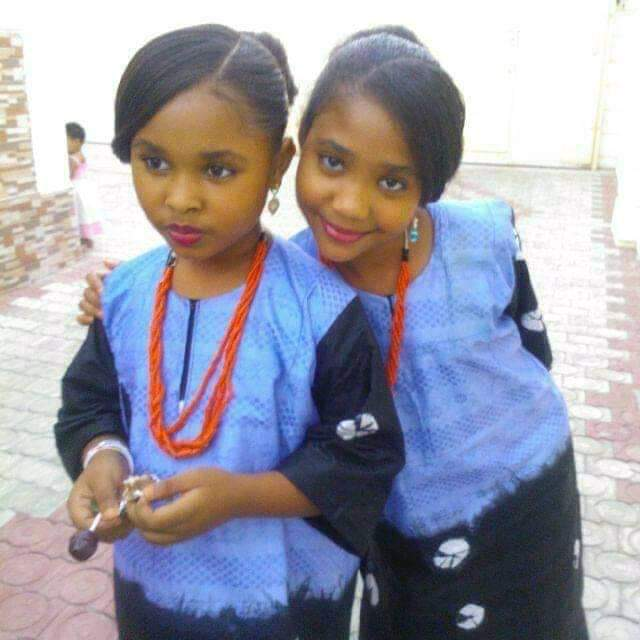
Two Kanuri girls

== Religion ==
The use of proverbs is very apparent in the Kanuri religion of Islam where they are used to help with comprehension of social happenings and to teach the meanings of things. These proverbs are created by the wise old men with a point of view based on the situation and what lesson is trying to be taught. Proverbs will usually reference objects found in everyday life. However, the objects used in the proverbs are used in such a way that they teach social attitudes, beliefs or experiences. Often proverbs are built around necessary acts that are carried out in daily life, but made to be easily visualized and applied to other, more intense situations. Kanuri proverbs can be used as a way to scare or warn the people of foolish or dangerous acts, but can also be more light hearted and encouraging.

The Kanuri became Muslims in the 11th century. Kanem became a centre of Muslim learning and the Kanuri soon controlled all the area surrounding Lake Chad and a powerful empire called Kanem Empire, which reached its height in the sixteenth and seventeenth centuries when they ruled much of Central Africa.

== Traditional state ==
Following the downfall of the Bornu Empire and the Scramble for Africa in the 19th century, the Kanuri were divided under the rule of the British, French and German Empires.

Despite the loss of the Kanuri-led state, the Shehu of Bornu continues as the head of the Bornu Emirate. This traditional Kanuri/Kanembu state maintains a ceremonial rule of the Kanuri people based in Maiduguri, Borno State, Nigeria, but acknowledged by the 4 million Kanuri in neighboring countries. The Shehu ("Sheikh") of Bornu draws his authority from a state founded before 1000 CE, the Kanem-Bornu Empire.

The current ruling line, the al-Kanemi dynasty, dates to the accession of Muhammad al-Amin al-Kanemi in the early 19th century, displacing the Sayfawa dynasty which had ruled from around 1300 CE. The 19th Shehu, Mustafa Ibn Umar El-Kanemi, died in February 2009, and was succeeded by Abubakar Ibn Umar Garba.

== Political leaders ==
In Nigeria, famous post-independence Kanuri leaders include Kashim Ibrahim, Ibrahim Imam, Zannah Bukar Dipcharima, Shettima Ali Monguno, Abba Habib, Muhammad Ngileruma, Baba Gana Kingibe, former GNPP leader Waziri Ibrahim, the former military ruler, Sani Abacha, and the former presidential candidate Bashir Tofa. In Niger, Kanuri-origin political leaders include the former Prime Minister of Niger Mamane Oumarou, and the former President of Niger, Mamadou Tandja.

== Kanuri regionalism in Nigeria ==
A Nigeria specific small Kanuri nationalist movement emerged in 1950s, centred on Bornu. Some "Pan-Kanuri" nationalists claimed an area of 532,460 square kilometres (205,580 sq mi) for the territory of what they called "Greater Kanowra", including the modern-day Lac and Kanem Prefectures in Chad, Far North Region in Cameroon, the Yobe and Borno states in Nigeria and Diffa and Zinder Regions in Niger and Darfur in Sudan.

In 1954, the Borno Youth Movement (BYM) was founded and played a role as a mass regionalist political party up through the end of colonialism, though it petered out at independence.

== Notable Kanuri people ==
- Sani Abacha – former Nigerian Head of State
- Zanna Bukar Dipcharima – Nigerian First Republic politician
- Ibrahim Gaidam – former Governor of Yobe State
- Abubakar Garbai – 9th Shehu of Borno
- Abubakar Shekau - Former Nigerian militant and 2nd leader of Boko Haram
- Mohammed Laminu Mele - Current Vice-Chancellor of University of Maiduguri
- Kashim Ibrahim – former Governor of Northern Nigeria
- Waziri Ibrahim – Northern People's Congress politician and founder of Great Nigeria People's Party during the Second Republic
- Ibrahim Imam – founder of Borno Youth Movement and former opposition leader in the Northern House of Assembly
- Baba Gana Kingibe – prominent diplomat and former SGF under President Umaru Yar'Adua
- Sanda Kura – 10th Shehu of Borno
- Aliyu Mai-Bornu – 1st indigenous Governor of the Central Bank of Nigeria
- Ali Modu Sheriff – former Governor of Borno State
- Kashim Shettima – Vice-president of Nigeria and former Governor of Borno State
- Umaru Shehu – physician and academic
- Bashir Tofa – businessman and politician
- Babagana Zulum – Governor of Borno State
- Mai Mala Buni – Governor of Yobe State
- Nicholas Said – 19th-century traveller, translator, Union Army soldier and author
