= Biltine =

Biltine may refer to:

- Biltine, Chad
- Biltine Prefecture
- Biltine Department
- Biltine Region, now named Wadi Fira
- Biltine language, other name: Amdang language
