= Lac (province) =

Region of Chad

Coordinates: 13°27′36″N 14°44′24″E

Lac البحيرة al-Buḥayrah
- Province
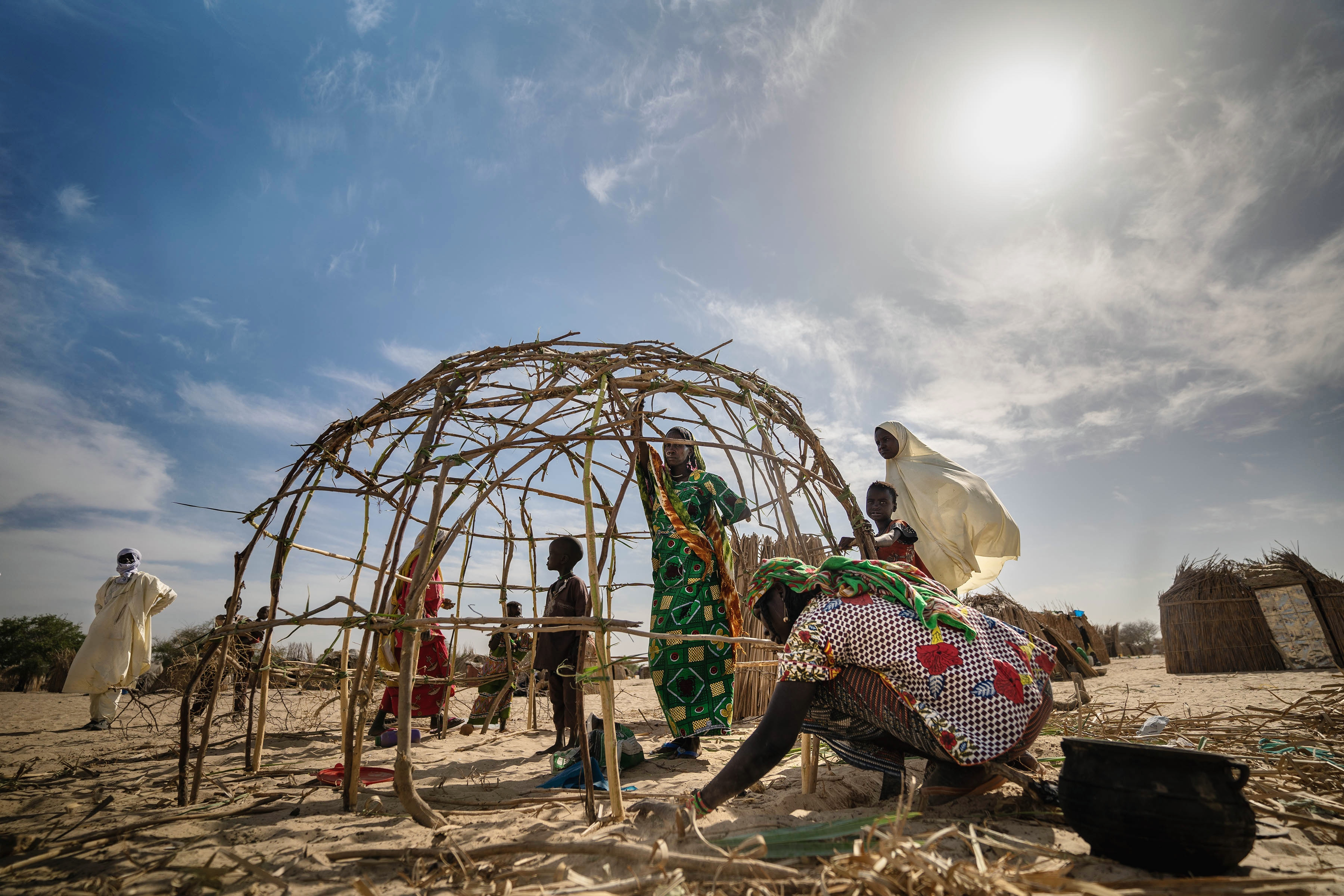

- Map of Chad showing Lac.
- Country: Chad
- Departments: 2
- Sub-prefectures: 8
- Provincial capital: Bol

Government
  - Governor: N'Garboudjoum Jacob (2008), Mahamat Abali Salah (2018)

Population (2009)
  - Total: 451,369
- Time zone: UTC+01:00 (WAT)

Lac (Arabic: البحيرة, romanised: al-Buḥayrah, lit. 'the Lake') is one of the 23 provinces of Chad. Its capital is Bol. It is chiefly composed of the former Lac Prefecture. The province includes Chad's portion of the shore of Lake Chad.

== Geography ==
The province borders Kanem Region to the north and east, Hadjer-Lamis Region and Cameroon to the south, Nigeria to the southwest, and Niger to the northwest.

The province is dominated geographically by Lake Chad, a seasonally fluctuating lake of major importance in this part of Africa. The region receives an annual rainfall of 600 mm (24 in) and has various vegetation zones.

=== Settlements ===
The provincial capital is Bol; other major settlements include Bagassola, Daboua, Doum Doum, Kangalam, Kouloudia, Liwa, Ngouboua and Ngouri.

== Demographics ==
Per the census of 2009, the population in the province was 451,369, 49.6% female. The average size of household was 4.60: 4.60 in rural households and 4.90 in urban areas. The number of households was 97,140: 94,857 in rural areas and 2,283 in urban areas. The number of nomads in the region was 16,025, 4.1% of the population. There were 450,424 people residing in private households. There were 194,211 over 18 years of age: 93,587 male and 100,624 female. The sex ratio was 101.00 females for every hundred males. There were 435,344 sedentary staff, 4.00 of the population.

The main ethnolinguistic groups are the Buduma (more than 18%), Fula and Kanembu (more than 66%).

== Economy ==
The province is the principal agricultural segment in the whole country, producing cotton and groundnut, the two main cashcrops of the country. There are a variety of local crops like rice also grown in the region.

== Administration ==
The province of Lac is divided into two departments, namely, Mamdi (capital Bol) and Wayi (capital Ngouri). As a part of decentralisation in February 2003, the country is administratively split into regions, departments, municipalities and rural communities. The prefectures which were originally 14 in number were re-designated in 17 regions. The regions are administered by Governors appointed by the President. Prefects, who originally held the responsibility of the 14 prefectures, still retained their titles and were responsible for the administration of smaller departments in each region. The members of local assemblies are elected every six years, while the executive organs are elected every three years.
