= Kanembu people =

Ethnic group in Chad

Kanembu
كَنٜݦُ
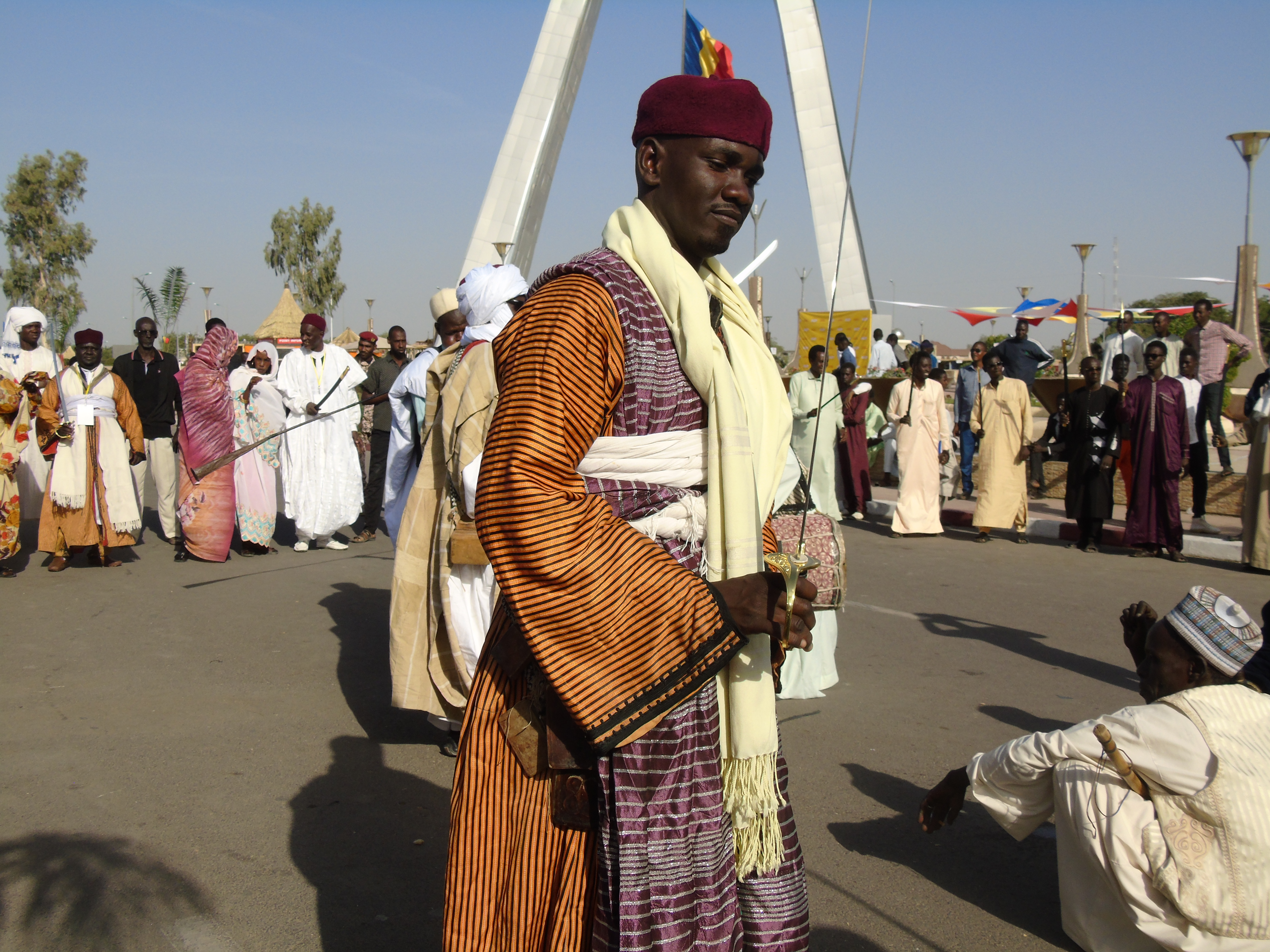
- Kanembu traditional dance

Total population
- 1,815,270

Regions with significant populations
- Chad (Lac, Kanem, and Chari-Baguirmi)

Languages
- Kanembu, Chadian Arabic, French

Religion
- Sunni Islam

Related ethnic groups
- Kanuri and Toubou

The Kanembu are an ethnic group of Chad, generally considered the modern descendants of the Kanem–Bornu Empire. The Kanembu are estimated to number 1,815,270 people, located primarily in Chad's Lac Prefecture but also in Chari-Baguirmi and Kanem prefectures. They speak the Kanembu language, which the Kanuri language is closely related to, with many speaking Arabic and sometimes nowadays French as a second language.

== Etymology ==
The word Kanembu means "the people [bu] of Kanem."

== History ==
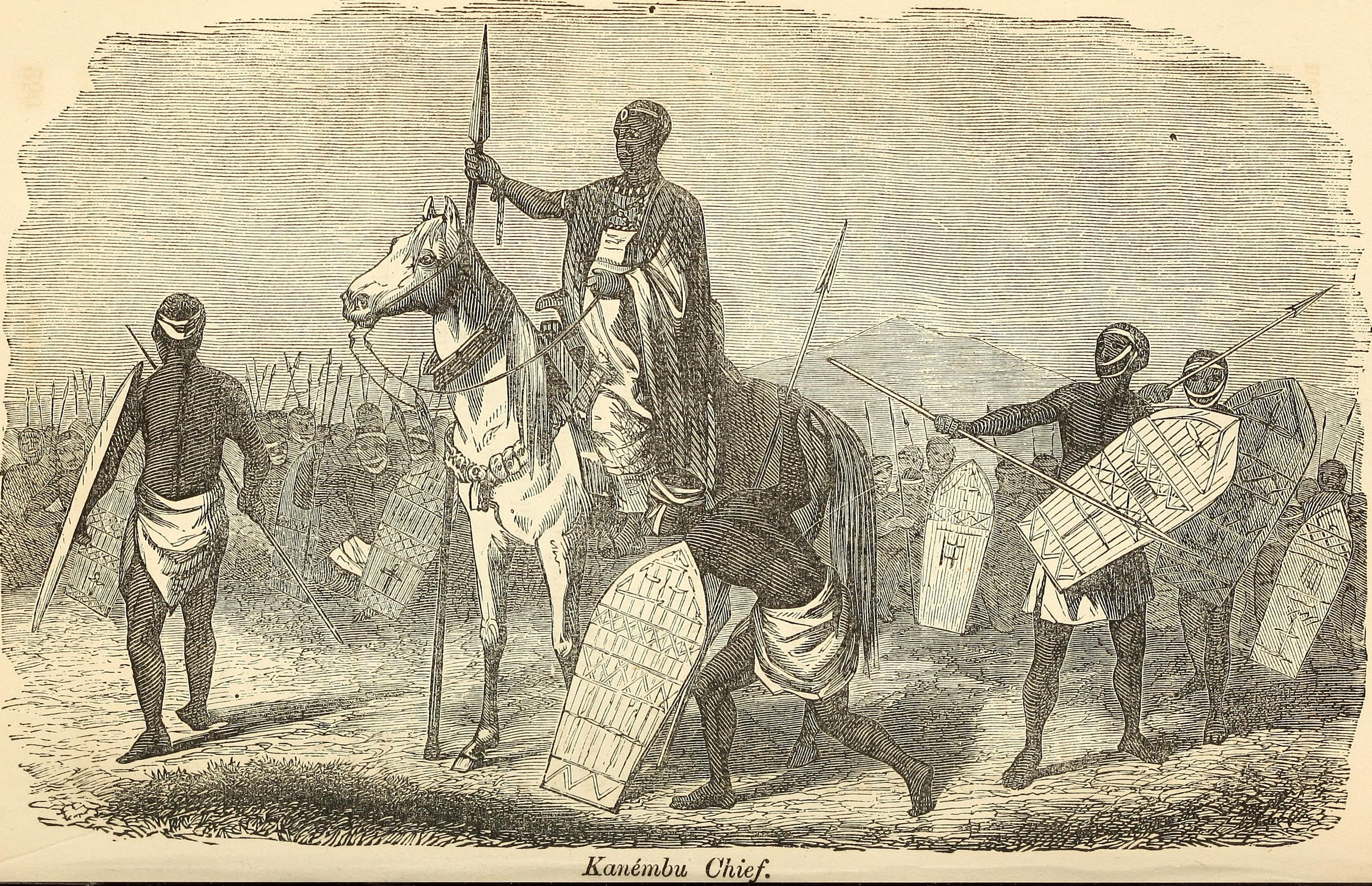
Kanembu chief, c. 1851

For over a thousand years the Kanem–Bornu Empire was a dominant power over central North Africa. Its sphere of influence covered Eastern Nigeria and Niger, the northern half of Chad, Cameroon, and Libya. Its inhabitants traded with Egypt and sponsored Islamic schools as far as Alexandria. Its camel caravans reached the Muslim holy cities of Mecca and Medina. Until the beginning of the 1900s and the French conquest of this area, the Kanem-Bornu Empire was the major power in the heart of central North Africa.

At the end of the twelfth century, the Kanembu moved into what is today Kanem Prefecture. They gradually became sedentary and established a capital at Njimi; at the same time, they continued military expansion establishing the Kanem Empire. The peak of this early kingdom came with the rule of Mai (King) Dunama Dabbalemi of the Sayfawa dynasty, who reigned from 1221 to 1259. He was the first of the Kanembu to convert to Islam, he declared jihad against the surrounding tribes and initiated an extended period of conquest. After consolidating their territory around Lake Chad they struck north at the Fezzan and west at the Hausa lands.

By the end of the fourteenth century, however, internal division had severely weakened the Kanem empire, forcing the Sayfawa dynasty to relocate to Borno on the western shore of Lake Chad. The intermarriage of the Kanem with the local people of this area created a new ethnic group, the Kanuri; the Kanembu retain close family ties with the Kanuri to this day.

Today the Kanembu people are one group of the descendants of this once highly successful empire, and their sultans and traditional rulers are still more influential than government authorities. Along with the related language group Kanuri, they make up the majority population found in a band between the Northern shores of Lake Chad and the Sahara Desert. Their culture of housing and clothing hasn't changed much since the imperial period.

== Economy ==
The Kanembu are Chad's merchant tribe. 75 to 80% of all merchants in Chad are Kanembu, making them one of Chad's wealthiest ethnic groups. They are a sedentary group who also engage in agriculture and raising livestock. Wheat, millet and corn are raised near the lake, but as the country is landlocked and has a poor road system, little agricultural trade has developed. As they live on the edge of the Sahara, famine is also a frequent threat to them with rain only coming during July, August and part of September.

== Genetics ==
According to one study, just one (R1b) Y-DNA haplogroup brought by Baggara Arabs makes up 50% of the Kanembu.

== See also ==
- Kanuri people
- Kanem Empire
- Bornu Empire
