= Borkou-Ennedi-Tibesti =

Borkou-Ennedi-Tibesti (BET) may refer to:

- Borkou-Ennedi-Tibesti Prefecture, the largest of the 14 prefectures of Chad between 1960 and 1999
- Borkou-Ennedi-Tibesti Region, a region of Chad between 2002 and 2008
