= Tandjilé =

Tandjilé may refer to:

- Tandjilé Prefecture, one of the 14 Prefectures of Chad, which existed from 1960, the year of independence, to 1999
- Tandjilé Region, one of the regions of Chad, established in 2002
