= Administrative divisions of Chad =

Political divisions for administration

Administrative divisions of Chad

The administrative divisions of Chad are in three levels. Chad is divided into 23 provinces, 120 departments, and 454 sub-prefectures. The last major reform was on 4 July 2024.

The divisions have often changed since 1900, when the territory was first created by France as part of its colonial empire, with the name Territoire Militaire des pays et protectorats du Tchad. The first subdivision took place in 1910, when 9 circumscriptions were made, named départements (departments) in 1935 and régions (regions) in 1947. As for the regions, they were further divided in districts.

In 1960, immediately before independence, the régions became préfectures (prefectures), and the districts instead sous-prefectures (sub-prefectures). The prefectures were in origin 11, later on raising to 14. In 1999 they were modified in 28 departments; this was ultimately changed in 2002, when 18 regions replaced them. Regions were divided into departments, while the latter were divided in sub-prefectures. After a series of splits in 2008 the number of regions increased to 22. In 2012 Ennedi Region was split into Ennedi-Est and Ennedi-Ouest, producing 23 regions. On 10 August 2018, a new ordinance (Note: Ordinance No. 038/PR/2018) divided Chad into 23 provinces, 107 departments, and 377 communes. The names of the former regions remained the same but were now called provinces.

== History ==
On September 5, 1900, a decree signed by the French President Émile Loubet officially created the Territoire militaire des pays et protectorats du Tchad as part of the growing French colonial empire. The new territory was placed under the command of a Commissioner who answered to the High Commissioner of the French Congo (called French Equatorial Africa (AEF) after 1910), of which Chad was a circumscription.

In 1906 Chad was merged with the Oubangui-Chari, becoming an autonomous territory within the Oubangui-Chari-Tchad colony, suppressed in 1916. In 1920 Chad was placed on an equal standing with the other AEF colonies (i. e. Gabon, Oubangui-Chari and Middle Congo).

It was only in 1958, when Chad was granted territorial autonomy, that the country was separated from the AEF. Two years later Chad was to come full independence under the government of François Tombalbaye and of the Chadian Progressive Party.

== 1910–19 circumscriptions ==
The first Governor-General of French Equatorial Africa, Martial Merlin, built in 1910 for all the colonies he administered a two levels structure. Chad was divided in 9 circonscriptions (circumscriptions), with Fort-Lamy (today N'Djamena) as capital; two years later, as an underdivision of the regions, the subdivisions were introduced. The Mayo-Kebbi circumscription disappeared in 1911 when the left bank of the Logone River was ceded to the German colony of Kamerun as part of the exchange for the French protectorate over Morocco. the area was retaken by France in World War I, and some years later, in 1922, the circumscription was restored and given back to Chad. On the other side Moyen-Chari was part of Oubangui-Chari from 1925 to 1933.

In 1914 a new circumscription was added with Borkou-Ennedi, renamed Borkou-Ennedi-Tibesti in 1930 when the Tibesti was passed from Niger to Chad.

N°	Circumscription	Capital
1	Baguirmi	Tchekna (Massénya)
2	Bas-Chari	Fort-Lamy
3	Batha	Ati
4	Kanem	Mao
5	Logone	Behagle (Laï)
6	Mayo-Kebbi	Léré
7	Moyen-Chari	Fort-Archambault
8	Ouaddaï	Abéché
9	Salamat	Am Timan

== 1934 departments ==
=== Centralization ===
In 1934 all the AEF was the object of a major administrative reorganization, known as Renard reform after the Governor-General Edouard Renard. Meant to cut down the maintainment costs and transform the AEF in a unitary colony divided in 4 regions. Chad was placed under a commandant de région who answered to the Governor-Delegate in Bangui, who instead was under the Governor-General in Brazzaville.

The circumscriptions of Chad took the name of departments and many of them were merged, while two departments, Logone (united with the Mayo-Kebbi) and Chari-Bangoran (Moyen-Chari and N'Délé) were separated from Chad and placed directly under Bangui's administration.

N°	Department
1	Borkou-Ennedi-Tibesti
2	Chari-Baguirmi
3	Kanem-Batha
4	Ouaddaï-Salamat

=== Decentralization ===
The radicality of these centralization measures proved themselves unsustainable, causing their reversion on the return to the previous structure of the AEF in 1936. In that year Logone and Moyen-Chari were returned to Chad while both Kanem-Batha and Chari-Baguirmi were split restoring the original 10 subdivisions. In 1944 the departments were brought to 9, when Bas-Chari and Baguirmi were merged back to recreate Chari-Baguirmi.

In 1937 Chad was made fully independent from Bangui but the administrator was given the lesser rank of commandant. The following year his rank was increased to governeur (governor), reestablishing a full parity among the AEF colonies.

This is the situation of Chad on December 31, 1945, concerning departments and subdivisions:

N°	Department	Subdivisions
1	Batha	Ati, Mongo, Ouadi Rimé, Oum Hadjer
2	Borkou-Ennedi-Tibesti	Borkou, Ennedi, Tibesti
3	Chari-Baguirmi	Bokoro, Bousso, Fort-Lamy, Massakory, Massénya
4	Kanem	Bol, Mao, Moussoro, Rig Rig, Ziguei
5	Logone	Baïbokoum, Doba, Kélo, Laï, Moundou
6	Mayo-Kebbi	Bongor, Fianga, Léré, Pala
7	Moyen-Chari	Fort-Archambault, Koumra, Kyabé, Moissala
8	Ouaddaï	Abéché, Adré, Am Dam, Biltine, Goz Beida
9	Salamat	Am Timan, Mangueigne, Melfi-Aboudéia

== See also ==
- Departments of Chad
- Prefectures of Chad
- Provinces of Chad
- Sub-prefectures of Chad
