= OGR (disambiguation) =

OGR may refer to:

- Optimal Golomb ruler, an optimal set of marks at integer positions along a ruler
- Bongor Airport, the IATA code OGR
- OGR model, a system which attempted to define a binary for intersex children
- The OGR library, the OGR geospatial data programming library, part of the GDAL
