= Alphonse Kotiga =

Chadian politician

Colonel Alphonse Kotiga, also known as Kotiga Guérina, was a Chadian military officer and politician. He was one of the leaders of the coup d'etat which overthrew and killed Chadian President François Tombalbaye on 15 April 1975, and then became a minister in the government of the new president, Félix Malloum.

A native of Moyen-Chari, he moved to southern Chad after Malloum's government collapsed in 1979. There he became the leader of an armed opposition group, the Red Codos, but was reconciled with the government of Hissène Habré in 1986.
