= Chadian Association of Baptist Churches =

- Association Tchadienne des Églises baptistes
- Abbreviation: ATEBAM
- Classification: Evangelical Christianity
- Theology: Baptist
- Headquarters: N'Djamena, Chad
- Origin: 1964

The Chadian Association of Baptist Churches (French: Association Tchadienne des Églises baptistes) (ATEBAM) is a Baptist Christian denomination in Chad. The headquarters is in N'Djamena.

== History ==
The Chadian Association of Baptist Churches has its origins in an American mission of the Baptist Mid-Missions organization in 1925 in Sarh. In the 1930s, a hospital and a Bible college were established in Koumra. In 1964, the association was officially founded. In 1979, she founded the Youth of Baptist Churches of Chad, an organization for young people.

== See also ==
- Bible
- Born again
- Jesus Christ
- Believers' Church
