= Biltine Airport =

Airport in Wadi Fira, Chad

- IATA: none; ICAO: FTTE

Summary
- Airport type: Public
- Serves: Biltine
- Location: Chad
- Elevation AMSL: 1,680 ft / 512 m
- Coordinates: 14°31′26.3″N 020°54′42.0″E

Map
- Location of Biltine Airport in Chad

Runways
Direction	Length		Surface
Direction	ft	m	Surface
07/25	4,760	1,451	Grass
- Source: Landings.com

Biltine Airport (ICAO: FTTE) (Arabic: مطار بلتن) is a public use airport located near Biltine, Wadi Fira, Chad.

== See also ==
- List of airports in Chad
