= Batha (prefecture) =

Prefecture of Chad

Batha Prefecture إقليم البطحاء
- Prefecture of Chad
- 1960–1999
- Flag

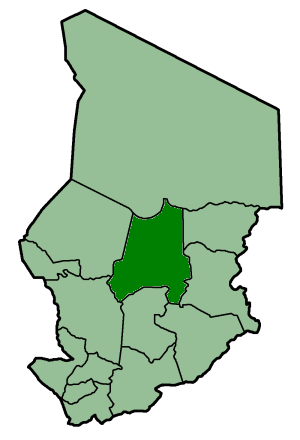
- Capital: Ati
- Area
  - Coordinates: 13°12′N 18°20′E
  - 1960: 100,000 km^{2} (39,000 sq mi)
  - 1993: 88,800 km^{2} (34,300 sq mi)
- Population
  - 1960: 279,873
  - 1993: 288,458
  - Type: Prefecture
- Historical era: Cold War
  - Established: 13 February 1960
  - Disestablished: 1 September 1999
- Political subdivisions: Sub-prefectures (1993): Ati; Djédaa; Oum Hadjer
Preceded by	Succeeded by
Batha Region	Batha Est; Batha Ouest
- Area and population source

Batha Prefecture (Arabic: ﺇﻗﻠﻴﻢ البطحاء) was one of the 14 prefectures of Chad. Located in the center of the country, Batha covered an area of 88,800 square kilometers and had a population of 288,458 in 1993. Its capital was Ati, Chad. It is largely coextensive with the current Batha Region.
