= Bongor Airport =

- IATA: OGR; ICAO: FTTB

Summary
- Airport type: Public
- Owner: Government
- Location: Bongor, Chad
- Coordinates: 10°17′18″N 015°22′47″E

Map
- Location of the airport in Chad

Runways
| Direction | Length | | Surface |
| Direction | m | ft | Surface |
|---|---|---|---|
| 09/27 | 1,628 | 5,340 | Grass |
- Sources: GCM, STV Landings.com

Bongor Airport (IATA: OGR, ICAO: FTTB) (Arabic: مطار بونقور) is an airport serving the city of Bongor, in the Mayo-Kebbi Est Region of Chad.

== See also ==
- List of airports in Chad
