= Coat of arms of Chad =

National coat of arms of the Republic of Chad

- Armiger: Republic of Chad
- Adopted: 1970
- Crest: A demi sun Gules
- Shield: Barry dancetty of eight Or and Azure
- Supporters: Dexter a goat guardant and sinister a lion Or, both charged on the shoulder with an arrow the point upwards Gules
- Motto: Unité, Travail, Progrès "Unity, Work, Progress"
- Order(s): National Order of Chad

The coat of arms of Chad was adopted in 1970. The center has a shield with jagged blue and yellow lines (barry dancetty), with a sun rising over it. The shield is supported by a goat and a lion. Below the shield is a medal and a scroll with the national motto in French, Unité, Travail, Progrès ("Unity, Work, Progress" in English). The shield supporters as well as the scroll feature a red arrow pointing upwards.

== Overview ==
The wavy lines on the shield symbolize Lake Chad; the crest, a rising sun, a new beginning for the country. The supporter on the left is a goat, representing the northern half of the state; the southern half is represented by the lion supporting the shield on the right. The insigne of the National Order of Chad (a red Maltese cross centered by a blue disc with golden six-pointed star) depends from the shield.

== Seal ==
A separate state emblem of Chad is a black-and-white seal consisting of the words "République du Tchad – Unité, Travail, Progrès" encircling a depiction of the head and upper body of a tribal girl with her hair in cornrows.

Seal of Chad

== See also ==
- Flag of Chad
