= Biltine (prefecture) =

Prefecture in Chad

Biltine Prefecture إقليم بلتن
- Prefecture of Chad
- 1960–1999
- Flag

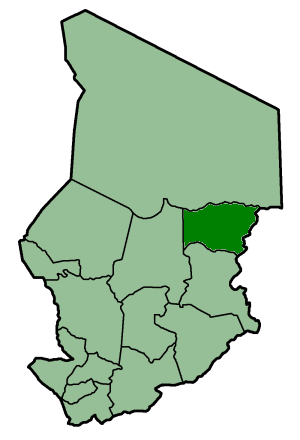
- Capital: Biltine
- Area
  - Coordinates: 14°31′N 20°55′E
  - 1960: 55,000 km^{2} (21,000 sq mi)
  - 1993: 46,850 km^{2} (18,090 sq mi)
- Population
  - 1960: 141,686
  - 1993: 187,807
  - Type: Prefecture
- Historical era: Cold War
  - Established: 1960
  - Disestablished: 1 September 1999
- Political subdivisions: Sub-prefectures (1993): Am Zoer; Arada; Biltine; Guéréda; Iriba
Preceded by	Succeeded by
Ouaddaï Prefecture	Biltine Department
- Area and population source

Biltine Prefecture (Arabic: ﺇﻗﻠﻴﻢ بلتن) was one of the 14 prefectures of Chad. Located in the east of the country, Biltine covered an area of 46,850 square kilometers and had a population of 184,807 in 1993. Its capital was Biltine. The Amdang language, spoken in parts of the prefecture, is sometimes called "Biltine".
