= Bongor =

Bongor بونقور
- City
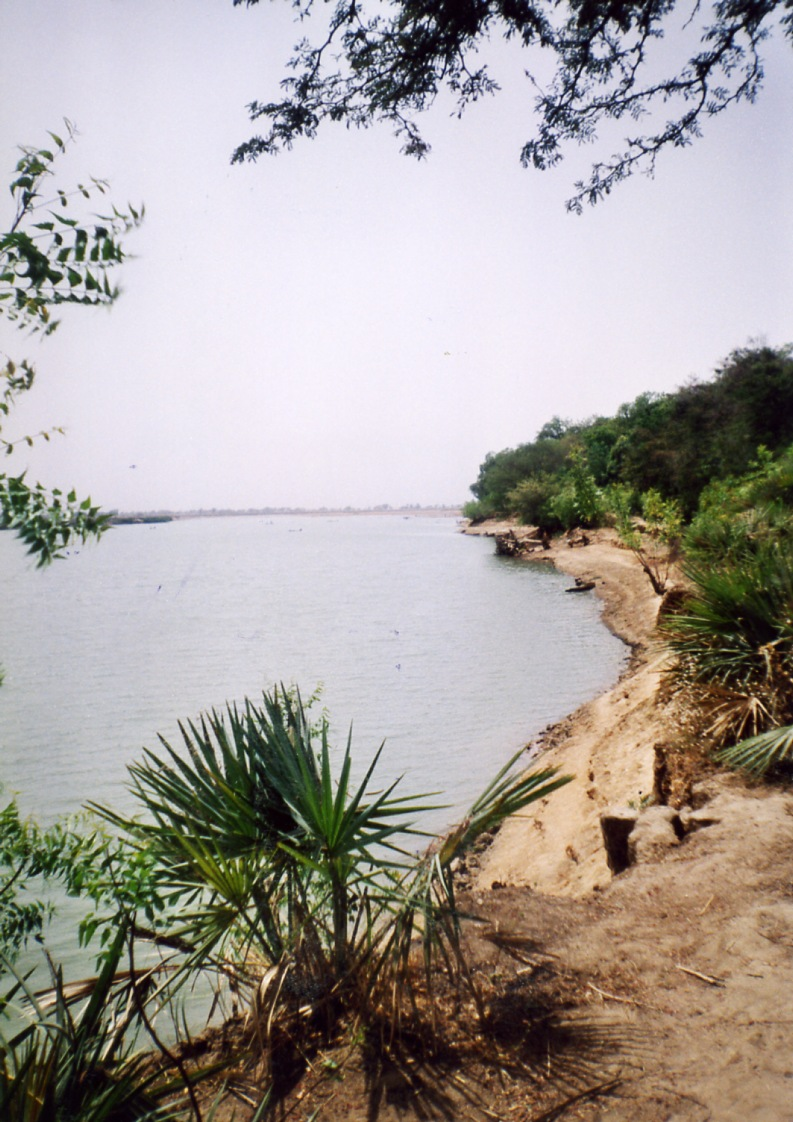
- The Logone River in Bongor

- Location in Chad
- Coordinates: 10°16′50″N 15°22′20″E
- Country: Chad
- Region: Mayo-Kebbi Est
- Department: Mayo-Boneye
- Sub-Prefecture: Bongor
- Elevation: 1,033 ft (315 m)

Population (2010)
  - Total: 30,518
- Time zone: UTC+01:00 (WAT)

Bongor (Arabic: بونقور) is a city in Chad, the capital of the region of Mayo-Kebbi Est. It is located on the eastern bank of the Logone River. During the rainy season (May–September), the Logone is navigable between Bongor and N'Djamena, Chad's capital. The population is 29,268 (2008).

Bongor has a lively central market square, an airport, a post office, a hospital, and the administrative offices for the Mayo-Kebbi Prefecture. Cotton and rice are the primary cash crops of the region. There is a hotel on the bank of the Logone. The principal market day is Monday and people come from the entire region for the weekly market.

Bongor was a part of German Cameroon until the 1911 German-French Treaty. In 1904, a military station was founded near Bongor by German colonial officer Herbert Kund, constituting the beginning of the city's modern history. Most of the local people belong to the Masa people ethnic group. The city has been an important centre of secondary education since colonial times. The Lycée Jacques Modeina is located in the city and many of the future leaders of the nations that became independent after the dissolution of the colony of French Equatorial Africa attended the Lycée.

== Climate ==
Climate data for Bongor
Month	Jan	Feb	Mar	Apr	May	Jun	Jul	Aug	Sep	Oct	Nov	Dec	Year
Mean daily maximum °C (°F)	34 (93)	36 (96)	39 (103)	42 (107)	40 (104)	38 (100)	34 (93)	31 (88)	33 (92)	37 (98)	37 (98)	34 (94)	36 (97)
Mean daily minimum °C (°F)	14 (57)	16 (60)	19 (67)	23 (74)	25 (77)	24 (75)	23 (73)	22 (72)	22 (72)	22 (71)	17 (63)	15 (59)	20 (68)
Source: Weatherbase

== Demographics ==
Year	Population
1988	19,900
1993	20,448
2008	29,268
2010	30,518

== See also ==
- Bongor Arabic
