= Salamat (prefecture) =

Salamat Prefecture Préfecture du Salamat
- Prefecture of Chad
- 1960–1999
- Flag

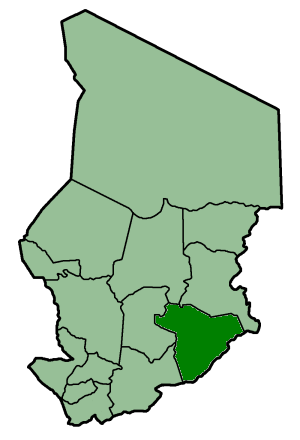
- Capital: Am Timan
- Area
  - Coordinates: 11°02′N 20°17′E
  - 1960: 76,000 km^{2} (29,000 sq mi)
  - 1993: 63,000 km^{2} (24,000 sq mi)
- Population
  - 1960: 62,716
  - 1993: 184,403
  - Type: Prefecture
- Historical era: Cold War
  - Established: 13 February 1960
  - Disestablished: 1 September 1999
- Political subdivisions: Sub-prefectures (1993): Aboudeïa; Am Timan; Harazé
Preceded by	Succeeded by
Salamat Region	Salamat Department
- Area and population source

Salamat was one of the 14 prefectures of Chad. Located in the southeast of the country, Salamat covered an area of 63,000 square kilometers and had a population of 184,403 in 1993. Its capital was Am Timan.

Salamat's population was a mix of both Muslim and non-Muslim peoples.

In the late 1960s, a highly regarded wildlife reserve was destroyed by Chadian rebels, although many native wildlife specimens survived, including elephants and giraffes. The area included some of the only water sources that remained available through the ten-month dry season.

== See also ==
- 2006 Zakouma elephant slaughter
- Regions of Chad
