= Baptist Mid-Missions =

Baptist Mid-Missions is an Independent Baptist mission agency based in Cleveland, Ohio.

== History ==
Originally named The General Council of Co-operating Baptist Missions of North America, Inc., this mission board was established October 15, 1920. Its first ministry was in French Equatorial Africa in the 1920s. During the same decade it established some works among the Afro-Caribbean English speaking community in Guasipati, and in El Callao, in the south-eastern region of Venezuela.

By 2006, Baptist Mid-Missions supported nearly 1000 missionaries in 50 countries and in all six inhabited continents.

Baptist Mid-Missions' focus is on church planting, which is supported by ministries such as Bible translation/literacy, seminaries, camps, broadcasting, publishing, and disaster relief.
