= Guéra (prefecture) =

Guéra Prefecture Préfecture du Guéra
- Prefecture of Chad
- 1960–1999
- Flag

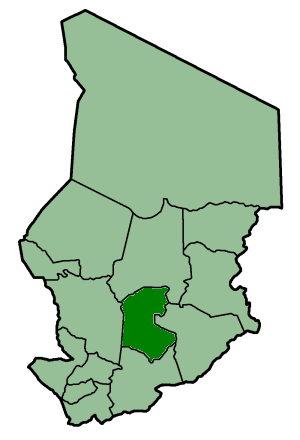
- Capital: Mongo
- Area
  - Coordinates: 12°10′N 18°41′E
  - 1960: 60,000 km^{2} (23,000 sq mi)
  - 1993: 58,950 km^{2} (22,760 sq mi)
- Population
  - 1960: 156,002
  - 1993: 306,253
  - Type: Prefecture
- Historical era: Cold War
  - Established: 13 February 1960
  - Disestablished: 1 September 1999
- Political subdivisions: Sub-prefectures (1993): Bitkine; Mangalmé; Melfi; Mongo
Preceded by	Succeeded by
Batha Region; Salamat Region	Guéra Department
- Area and population source

Guéra was one of the 14 prefectures of Chad. Its capital was Mongo. Located in the south of the country, Guéra covered an area of 58,950 square kilometers and had a population of 306,253 in 1993, of which 263,843 were sedentary (rural: 219,884; urban: 43,959) and 42,810 were nomadic. The predominant ethno-linguistic groups were the Hadjerai (66.18%) and the Arabs (21.11%).

== See also ==
- Provinces of Chad
