= Ouaddaï (prefecture) =

Ouaddaï Prefecture Préfecture du Ouaddaï عمالة وداي
- Prefecture of Chad
- 1960–1999
- Flag

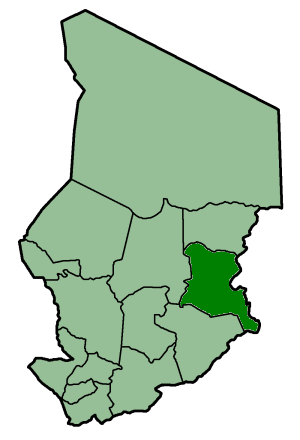
- Capital: Abéché
- Area
  - Coordinates: 13°49′N 20°50′E
  - 1960: 75,000 km^{2} (29,000 sq mi)
  - 1993: 76,240 km^{2} (29,440 sq mi)
- Population
  - 1960: 306,265
  - 1993: 543,900
  - Type: Prefecture
- Historical era: Cold War
  - Established: 13 February 1960
  - Separation of Biltine Prefecture: 1960
  - Disestablished: 1 September 1999
- Political subdivisions: Sub-prefectures (1993): Abéché; Adré; Am Dam; Goz Béïda
Preceded by
Ouaddaï Region
Succeeded by
Biltine Prefecture
Ouaddaï Department
Assoungha Department
Sila Department
- Area and population source

Ouaddaï (Arabic: وداي) was one of the 14 prefectures of Chad. Located in the east of the country, Ouaddaï covered an area of 76,240 square kilometers and had a population of 543,900 in 1993. Its capital was Abéché.

== See also ==
- Ouaddai Kingdom
- Regions of Chad
