= Logone Oriental (prefecture) =

Logone Oriental Prefecture Préfecture du Logone Oriental
- Prefecture of Chad
- 1962–1999
- Flag

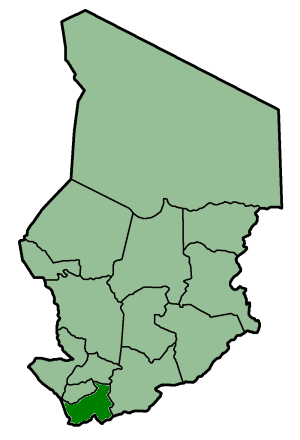
- Capital: Doba
- Area
  - Coordinates: 8°39′N 16°51′E
  - 1993: 28,035 km^{2} (10,824 sq mi)
- Population
  - 1993: 441,064
  - Type: Prefecture
- Historical era: Cold War
  - Established: 9 January 1962
  - Disestablished: 1 September 1999
- Political subdivisions: Sub-prefectures (1993): Baïbokoum; Bébédjia; Doba; Goré
Preceded by	Succeeded by
Logone Prefecture	Logone Oriental Department; Monts de Lam Department
- Area and population source

Logone Oriental was one of the 14 prefectures of Chad. Located in the southwest of the country, Logone Oriental covered an area of 28,035 square kilometers and had a population of 441,064 in 1993. Its capital was Doba.

== See also ==
- Regions of Chad
