= Tandjilé (prefecture) =

Chadian prefecture

Tandjilé Prefecture Préfecture du Tandjilé
- Prefecture of Chad
- 1962–1999
- Flag

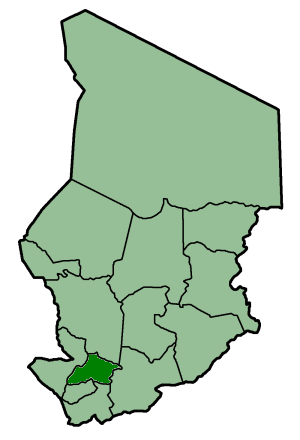
- Capital: Laï
- Area
  - Coordinates: 9°24′N 16°18′E
  - 1993: 18,045 km^{2} (6,967 sq mi)
- Population
  - 1993: 453,854
  - Type: Prefecture
- Historical era: Cold War
  - Established: 9 January 1962
  - Disestablished: 1 September 1999
- Political subdivisions: Sub-prefectures (1993): Béré; Kélo; Laï
Preceded by	Succeeded by
Logone Prefecture	Tandjilé Est Department; Tandjilé Ouest Department
- Area and population source

Tandjilé was one of the 14 prefectures of Chad. Located in the southwest of the country, Tandjilé covered an area of 18,045 square kilometers and had a population of 453,854 in 1993. Its capital was Laï.

== See also ==
- Regions of Chad
