= Mayo-Kébbi (prefecture) =

Mayo-Kébbi Prefecture Préfecture du Mayo-Kébbi
- Prefecture of Chad
- 1960–1999
- Flag

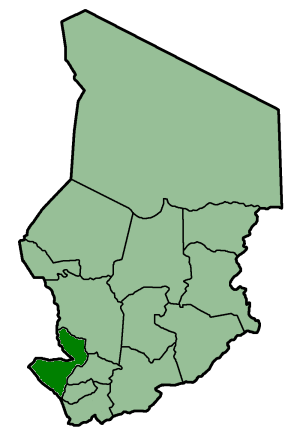
- Capital: Bongor
- Area
  - Coordinates: 10°16′N 15°22′E
  - 1960: 35,000 km^{2} (14,000 sq mi)
  - 1993: 30,105 km^{2} (11,624 sq mi)
- Population
  - 1960: 368,333
  - 1993: 825,158
  - Type: Prefecture
- Historical era: Cold War
  - Established: 13 February 1960
  - Disestablished: 1 September 1999
- Political subdivisions: Sub-prefectures (1993): Bongor; Fianga; Gounou Gaya; Pala; Goré
Preceded by
Mayo-Kébbi Region
Succeeded by
Kabbia Department
Mayo-Boneye Department
Mayo-Dallah Department
- Area and population source

Mayo-Kébbi was one of the 14 prefectures of Chad. Located in the southwest of the country, Mayo-Kébbi covered an area of 30,105 square kilometers and had a population of 825,158 in 1993. Its capital was Bongor.

== See also ==
- Regions of Chad
