= Lac (prefecture) =

Lac Prefecture ﺇﻗﻠﻴﻢ ﻻﻙ
- Prefecture of Chad
- 1962–1999
- Flag

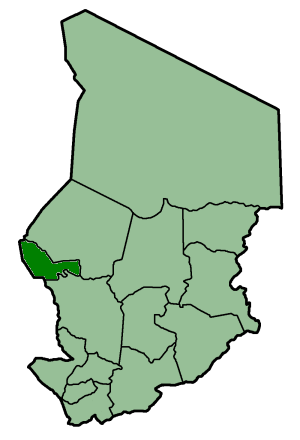
- Capital: Bol
- Area
  - Coordinates: 13°27′N 14°44′E
  - 1993: 22,320 km^{2} (8,620 sq mi)
- Population
  - 1993: 252,932
  - Type: Prefecture
- Historical era: Cold War
  - Established: 29 October 1962
  - Disestablished: 1 September 1999
- Political subdivisions: Sub-prefectures (1993): Bol; Ngouri
Preceded by	Succeeded by
Kanem Prefecture	Lac Department
- Area and population source

Lac (Arabic: ﺇﻗﻠﻴﻢ ﻻﻙ) was one of the 14 prefectures of Chad. Located in the west of the country, Lac covered an area of 22,320 square kilometers and had a population of 252,932 in 1993. Its capital was Bol.

== See also ==
- Regions of Chad
