= Logone Occidental (prefecture) =

Logone Occidental Prefecture Préfecture du Logone Occidental
- Prefecture of Chad
- 1962–1999
- Flag

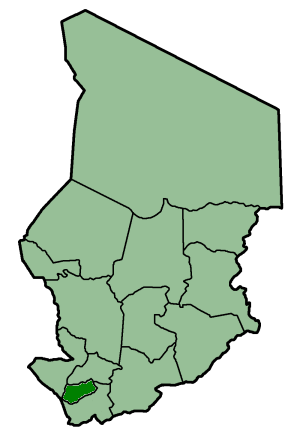
- Capital: Moundou
- Area
  - Coordinates: 8°34′N 16°05′E
  - 1993: 8,695 km^{2} (3,357 sq mi)
- Population
  - 1993: 455,489
  - Type: Prefecture
- Historical era: Cold War
  - Established: 9 January 1962
  - Disestablished: 1 September 1999
- Political subdivisions: Sub-prefectures (1993): Beinamar; Benoyé; Moundou
Preceded by	Succeeded by
Logone Prefecture	Logone Occidental Department
- Area and population source

Logone Occidental was one of the 14 prefectures of Chad. Located in the southwest of the country, Logone Occidental covered an area of 8,695 square kilometers and had a population of 455,489 in 1993. Its capital was Moundou.

== See also ==
- Regions of Chad
