= Biltine, Chad =

Biltine بلتن
- City
- Location in Chad
- Coordinates: 14°31′39″N 20°55′36″E
- Country: Chad
- Region: Wadi Fira Region
- Department: Biltine Department
- Sub-Prefecture: Biltine
- Elevation: 1,678 ft (511 m)

Population (2009)
  - Total: 11,840
- Time zone: UTC+01:00 (WAT)

Biltine (Arabic: بلتن) is a city in Chad, and the capital of Wadi Fira region (previously Biltine prefecture).

The town was briefly captured on November 25, 2006, by the RADF, a rebel group, then recaptured the next day by the government, along with nearby Abéché that had been captured by a different rebel group, the UFDD. On June 16, 2008, the town was the scene of a battle between rebels and government forces, with the rebels said to have won.

The town is served by Biltine Airport.

== Demographics ==
Year	Population
1993	8,100
2009	11,840
