= Borkou–Ennedi–Tibesti (prefecture) =

Former prefecture in Chad

Borkou-Ennedi-Tibesti Prefecture Préfecture du Borkou-Ennedi-Tibesti
- Prefecture of Chad
- 1960–1999
- Flag

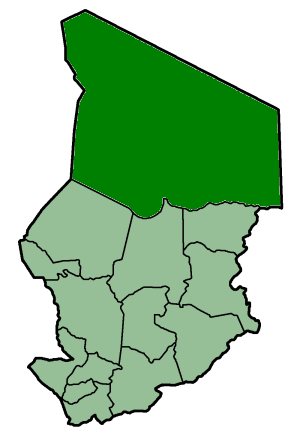
- Capital: Faya-Largeau
- Area
  - Coordinates: 17°55′N 19°07′E
  - 1960: 530,000 km^{2} (200,000 sq mi)
  - 1993: 600,350 km^{2} (231,800 sq mi)
- Population
  - 1960: 51,472
  - 1993: 73,185
- Government
  - Type: Prefecture
- Historical era: Cold War
  - Established: 13 February 1960
  - End of French administration: 23 January 1965
  - Libyan occupation: 1973–1987
  - Disestablished: 1 September 1999
- Political subdivisions: Sub-prefectures (1993): Borkou; Ennedi; Tibesti
Preceded by
Borkou-Ennedi-Tibesti Region
Succeeded by
Borkou Department
Ennedi Department
Tibesti Department
- Area and population source

Borkou–Ennedi–Tibesti Prefecture was the largest of the 14 prefectures of Chad between 1960 and 1999. It was transformed into Borkou–Ennedi–Tibesti Region, one of the 18 regions into which the country has been divided since 2002. Its name is often abbreviated to BET.

Located in the north of Chad it was adjacent to Libya, while also bordering Niger and Sudan. Borkou–Ennedi–Tibesti covered an area of 600,350 km^{2}, almost half of Chad's total area. It had a population of 73,185 (as of 1993), partly nomadic and also scattered small towns and other settlements. Its capital was Faya-Largeau.

== Geography ==
Borkou-Ennedi-Tibesti is located in the Sahara Desert and extends into the Sahel. Its diverse topography ranges from the volcanic Tibesti Mountains to the Bodélé Depression, a vast Holocene lake-bed that is one of the Earth's strongest dust storm–producing regions. Overall, the territory is extremely arid.
