= Prefectures of Chad =

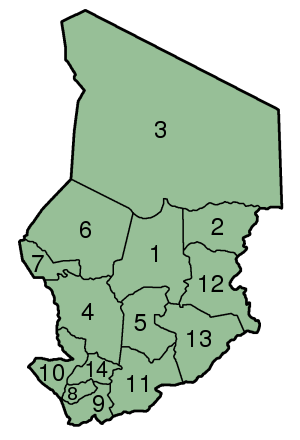

Chad was divided into 14 prefectures from 1960, the year of independence, to 1999, when the country was divided in 28 departments. A further reorganisation in 2002 divided the country into 18 regions. As of 2024, the country was divided into 23 provinces.

NB : Alphabetic order

| N° | Prefecture | Capital | Subprefectures |
|---|---|---|---|
| 1 | Batha | Ati | Ati, Djedda, Oum Hadjer |
| 2 | Biltine | Biltine | Am Zoer, Arada, Biltine, Guéréda, Iriba |
| 3 | Borkou-Ennedi-Tibesti | Faya-Largeau | Borkou, Ennedi, Tibesti |
| 4 | Chari-Baguirmi | N'Djamena | Bokoro, Bousso, Massakory, N'Djamena |
| 5 | Guéra | Mongo | Bitkine, Mangalmé, Melfi, Mongo |
| 6 | Kanem | Mao | Mao, Moussoro, Nokou |
| 7 | Lac | Bol | Bol, Ngouri |
| 8 | Logone Occidental | Moundou | Beinamar, Benoye, Moundou |
| 9 | Logone Oriental | Doba | Baibokoum, Bebedjia, Doba, Goré |
| 10 | Mayo-Kébbi | Bongor | Bongor, Fianga, Gounou Gaya, Léré, Pala |
| 11 | Moyen-Chari | Sarh | Koumra, Kyabé, Maro, Moissala, Sarh |
| 12 | Ouaddaï | Abéché | Abéché, Adré, Am Dam, Goz Beida |
| 13 | Salamat | Am Timan | Aboudeia, Am Timan, Haraze Mangueigne |
| 14 | Tandjilé | Laï | Béré, Kélo, Laï |

| Flag of Chad | Prefectures of Chad | Flag of Chad |

Batha · Biltine · Borkou-Ennedi-Tibesti · Chari-Baguirmi · Guéra · Kanem · Lac · Logone Occidental · Logone Oriental · Mayo-Kébbi · Moyen-Chari · Ouaddaï · Salamat · Tandjilé ·

See also : Regions of Chad - Departments of Chad
