= Kanem (prefecture) =

Kanem Prefecture Préfecture du Kanem
- Prefecture of Chad
- 1960–1999
- Flag

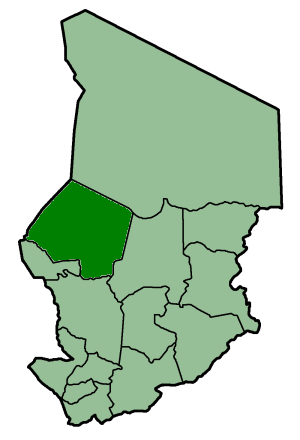
- Capital: Mao
- Area
  - Coordinates: 14°07′N 15°18′E
  - 1960: 150,000 km^{2} (58,000 sq mi)
  - 1993: 114,520 km^{2} (44,220 sq mi)
- Population
  - 1960: 215,133
  - 1993: 279,927
  - Type: Prefecture
- Historical era: Cold War
  - Established: 13 February 1960
  - Separation of Lac Prefecture: 29 October 1962
  - Disestablished: 1 September 1999
- Political subdivisions: Sub-prefectures (1993): Mao; Moussoro; Nokou
Preceded by
Kanem Region
Succeeded by
Lac Prefecture
Kanem Department
Bahr el Gazel Department
- Area and population source

Kanem was one of the 14 prefectures of Chad. Located in the west of the country, Kanem covered an area of 114,520 square kilometers and had a population of 279,927 in 1993. Its capital was Mao.

== See also ==
- Regions of Chad
