= Moyen-Chari (prefecture) =

Moyen-Chari Prefecture Préfecture du Moyen-Chari
- Prefecture of Chad
- 1960–1999
- Flag

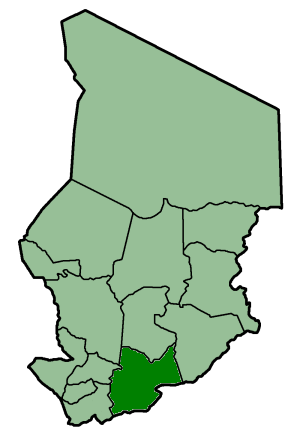
- Capital: Fort Archambault (1960–1972) Sarh (1972–1999)
- Area
  - Coordinates: 09°09′N 18°23′E
  - 1960: 40,000 km^{2} (15,000 sq mi)
  - 1993: 45,180 km^{2} (17,440 sq mi)
- Population
  - 1960: 281,127
  - 1993: 738,595
  - Type: Prefecture
- Historical era: Cold War
  - Established: 13 February 1960
  - Disestablished: 1 September 1999
- Political subdivisions: Sub-prefectures (1993): Koumra; Kyabé; Maro; Moïssala; Sarh
Preceded by
Moyen-Chari Region
Succeeded by
Barh Köh Department
Lac Iro Department
Mandoul Department
- Area and population source

Moyen-Chari was one of the 14 prefectures of Chad. Located in the south of the country, Moyen-Chari covered an area of 45,180 square kilometers and had a population of 738,595 in 1993. Its capital was Sarh.

== See also ==
- 2006 Zakouma elephant slaughter
- Regions of Chad
