= Chari-Baguirmi (prefecture) =

Prefecture of Chad (1960–1999)

Chari-Baguirmi Prefecture Préfecture du Chari-Baguirmi محافظة شاري باقرمي
- Prefecture of Chad
- 1960–1999
- Flag

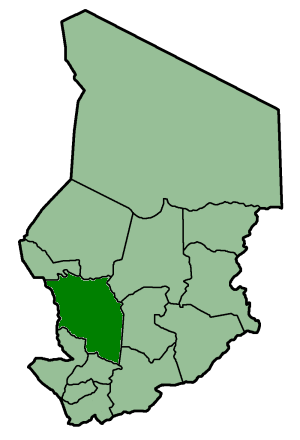
- Capital: Fort-Lamy (1960–1973) N'Djamena (1973–1999)
- Area
  - Coordinates: 12°06′N 15°2′E
  - 1960: 100,000 km^{2} (39,000 sq mi)
  - 1993: 82,910 km^{2} (32,010 sq mi)
- Population
  - 1960: 300,043
  - 1993: 720,941
  - Type: Prefecture
- Historical era: Cold War
  - Established: 13 February 1960
  - Disestablished: 1 September 1999
- Political subdivisions: Sub-prefectures (1993): Bokoro; Bousso; Massakory; Massénya; N'Djamena-Rural; N'Djamena-Urban
Preceded by
Chari-Baguirmi Region
Succeeded by
Baguirmi Department
Dababa Department
Hadjer-Lamis Department
- Area and population source

Chari-Baguirmi was one of the 14 prefectures of Chad. This was before Chad's further reorganisation in 2002 into 18 regions and an even further division as of 2024, into 23 provinces. Located in the west of the country, Chari-Baguirmi prefecture covered an area of 82,910 square kilometers and had a population of 720,941 in 1993. Its capital was Ndjamena.

== See also ==
- Regions of Chad
