= Flag of Chad =

Republic of Chad
- Use: National flag
- Proportion: 2:3
- Adopted: November 6, 1959; 67 years ago
- Design: A vertical tricolour of indigo, yellow, and red
- Designed by: Naiyia Amina Goudja
- Presidential standard of Chad
- Use: Presidential standard
- Proportion: 2:3
- Design: A vertical tricolour of indigo, yellow, and red with the national coat of arms in the center

The national flag of Chad is a vertical tricolour of indigo, yellow, and red. It was adopted on 6 November 1959, almost a year after the founding of the autonomous Republic of Chad. Since the 1990s, its similarity to the flag of Romania has caused international discussion.

== Colour ==
(1959–present)	Indigo	Yellow	Red
RGB	0-32-91	252-205-0	200-16-46
Web colours	#00205B	#FFCD00	#C8102E

== Description ==
The flag of Chad is a vertical tricolour consisting (left to right) of a indigo, a yellow and a red column. The colours of the Chadian flag were intended to be a combination of the colours of blue, white and red as seen on the flag of France with the Pan-African colours of green, yellow and red as seen on the flag of Ethiopia. Furthermore, the indigo represents the lake Chad and the Black African heritage; the yellow represents the sands of the Sahara desert, and the red represents the bloodshed over independence of Chad from France.

When the legislative commission in Chad first proposed a design for their national flag in June 1959, it featured a vertical tricolor of green, yellow, and red similar to the Flag of Mali. They changed the original green stripe to blue for the final design adopted in November 1959 to avoid confusion with Mali, which were already using the same Pan-African colors.

The flag was adopted in 1959 for the autonomous republic and retained on independence in 1960, and in the constitution of 1962. Despite many political upheavals within Chad since independence, the flag has not been changed. This may be because the flag is not associated with any of the main power rivals within Chad, which had no sense of national identity before independence, and little after independence.

== Similarity with Romanian flag ==
The flag of Chad is almost identical to the national flag of Romania, although the colours in Chad flags may vary more than those specified for Romania. Romania has used the flag since 1866, which appeared for the first time in its current form in Wallachia. It was officially in use from 1866 until 1948, when it was superseded by the flag of the Socialist Republic of Romania. Chad began to use its present flag in 1960, after it achieved independence from France. When Chad adopted its flag, Romania's flag also included an emblem in the middle of the flag on top of the tricolour; this was added after World War II during the Communist era of the second half of the 20th century. However, in 1989 Romania's Communist government was overthrown and the insignia was removed, reverting Romania's flag to the prewar version which matched the one which had been adopted by Chad in the meantime.

The crisis between Romania and Chad sharing similar flags has concerned the Chadian government on occasion; they requested in 2004 that the United Nations examine the issue. In response, Romanian President Ion Iliescu stated that no change would occur to the flag, as the existence of Romania's tricolour predates the existence of Chad as a whole: "The tricolour belongs to us. We will not give up the tricolour."

In May 2025, George Simion, the right-wing populist candidate in the 2025 Romanian presidential election, mistakenly used the national flag of Chad instead of the Romanian flag in a post on X claiming he had won prior to the vote count being completed.

== Historical flags ==
Flag of Kanem according to Angelino Dulcert (1339)

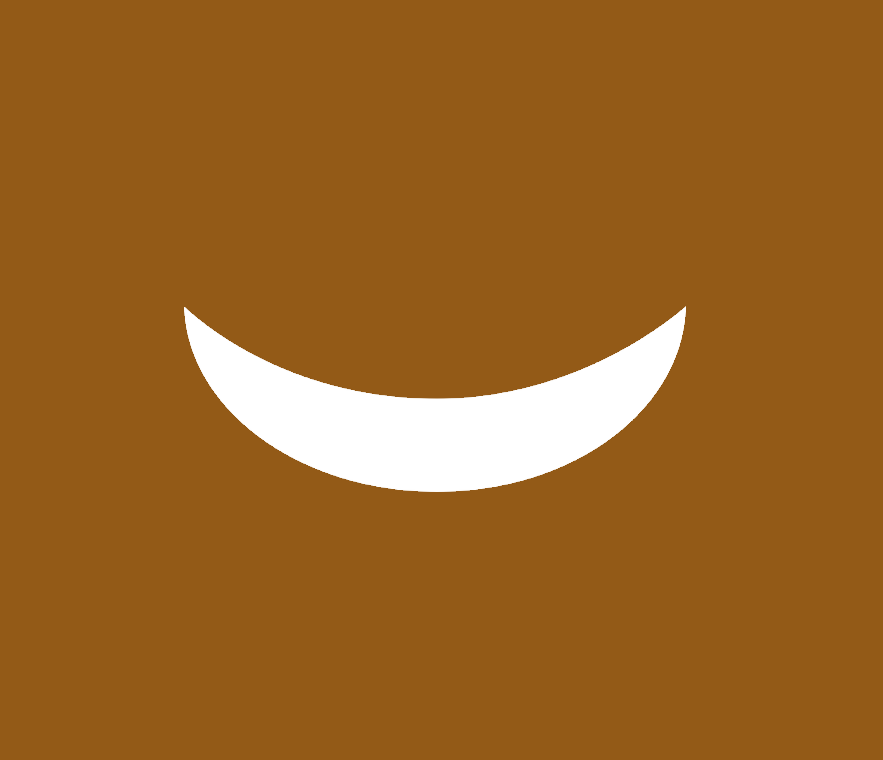
Flag of Bornu (Kanem's successor) according to Gabriel de Vallseca (1439)

Flag of France used in French Equatorial Africa (1900–1959)

Flag of the Free French government of Chad under Pierre-Olivier Lapie (1940–1942)

Lapie's personal flag (1940–1942)

Standard of the French Community

== See also ==
- Coat of arms of Chad
- Flag of Romania
