= List of Chadians =

This is a list of notable people from Chad.

== A ==
- Abdelwahid Aboud Mackaye: (born 1953), rebel insurgent leader
- Acyl Ahmat Agbas: (1944–1982), Foreign Minister 1979–1981
- Salma Khalil Alio: (born 1982), poet

== B ==
- Aziza Baroud: UN Representative
- Mohamed Baghlani: (leader of the Volcan Army, died 1977)
- Jean Alingué Bawoyeu: (born 1937), Prime Minister 1991–1992
- Lydie Beassemda (born c. 1967), women's rights activist and government minister
- Mahamoud Adam Béchir: Chad's Ambassador to South Africa since 2012, formerly the Chadian Ambassador to the United States from 2004 to 2012.
- Outel Bono: (liberal politician, died 1973)
- Mariam Brahim: (born 1956), physician

== C ==
- Issa Serge Coelo: (born 1967), film director

== D ==
- Dunama Dabbalemi: (emperor of Kanem 1221–1259)
- Brahim Déby: son of Chadian President Idriss Déby
- Idriss Déby: (1952–2021)
- Yaya Dillo Djérou: leader of the insurgent group Platform for Change, Unity and Democracy
- Koibla Djimasta: (born 1950), Prime Minister 1995–97
- Negue Djogo: (head of the Chadian Armed Forces)
- Jacques Doumro: (head of the Chadian Armed Forces)

== G ==
- Pierre Toura Gaba: (1920–1998), former Secretary General of the Chadian Progressive Party, Chadian ambassador to Germany from 1966 to 1973, Chadian ambassador to the United States from 1976 to 1979

== H ==
- Hissène Habré

== I ==
- Mahamat Idriss

== K ==
- Wadel Abdelkader Kamougué
- Saleh Kebzabo
- Djibrine Kerallah
- Delwa Kassiré Koumakoye
- Grace Kodindo: (born 1960), obstetrician
- Alphonse Kotiga
- Ahmed Koulamallah
- Marie-Christine Koundja: (born 1957), writer

== L ==
- Gabriel Lisette
- Rose Lokissim: one of the first Chadian elite soldiers, she fought against Hissène Habré's dictatorship in the 1980s, was captured, tortured, and ultimately executed
- Elise Loum: (born 1956), Vice-President of the African Union's Pan-African Parliament

== M ==
- Félix Malloum
- Hassan Abdallah Mardigue
- Idriss Miskine
- Fidèle Moungar
- Mariam Ali Moussa, Minister and Ambassador to Germany and Austria
- Ahmed Hassan Musa

== N ==
- Kaltouma Nadjina
- Ndolenodji Alixe Naïmbaye
- Japhet N'Doram
- Mahamat Nour

== O ==
- Noël Milarew Odingar
- Nassour Guelendouksia Ouaido
- Goukouni Oueddei

== R ==
- Aboubakar Abdel Rahmane, Chadian warlord and founder of FROLINAT who was active during the civil war (1966–1993)

== S ==
- Gontchomé Sahoulba
- Ibni Oumar Mahamat Saleh
- Joseph Brahim Seid
- Lol Mohamed Shawa
- Abba Siddick
- Achta Djibrine Sy

== T ==
- Youssouf Togoïmi
- Nabatingue Toko
- François Tombalbaye
- Khadidja Touré

== U ==
- Uthman I of Kanem: ruled the Kanem-Bornu Empire from 1356 to 1369 during the Sayfawa dynasty
- Uthman II of Kanem: ruled the Kanem-Bornu Empire from 1369 to 1371 during the Sayfawa dynasty
- Uthman III Kalinumuwa: ruled the Kanem-Bornu Empire from 1463 to 1473 during the Sayfawa dynasty

== Y ==
- Nagoum Yamassoum
- Pascal Yoadimnadji
- Joseph Yodoyman
- Ngarlejy Yorongar

== See also ==
- Heads of state of Chad
- Sayfawa dynasty
