= Ibrahim Abatcha =

Chadian politician (1938–1968)

Leader of the FROLINAT
- In office 19 June 1966 – 11 February 1968
- Preceded by: Post established
- Succeeded by: Abba Siddick

Personal details
- Born: 1938 Borno, British Nigeria
- Died: 11 February 1968 (aged 29–30) eastern Chad
- Citizenship: Nigeria; Chad
- Party: Chadian National Union; FROLINAT

Ibrahim Abatcha (1938 – February 11, 1968) was a Chadian revolutionary and political leader who played a key role in the early stages of armed resistance against the government of Chad. Abatcha was a Marxist–Leninist activist. His political activity started during the decolonization process of Chad from France, but after the country's independence he was forced to go into exile. While in exile, he was one of the founders of the Front de Libération Nationale du Tchad (FROLINAT), an organization established in 1966 to oppose the rule of President François Tombalbaye.

Abatcha was influenced by socialist and anti-colonial movements. He sought to unite various opposition factions in Chad to fight against perceived government corruption, ethnic discrimination, and neocolonial influence. Under his leadership, FROLINAT launched guerrilla operations against government forces, marking the beginning of a prolonged insurgency in Chad. Abatcha was killed in combat in 1968, but his ideas and movement continued to shape Chadian politics, influencing insurgent groups and conflicts in the country.

== Early life and career ==
Originally from Borno (a province of the British colony of Nigeria), Abatcha was born into a family with a Muslim background in the French colony of Chad at Fort-Lamy (today N'Djamena) in 1938, and learned to speak French, English and Chadian Arabic, but not to write Classical Arabic, as he did not study in a Qur'anic school. He found work as a clerk in the colonial administration and became a militant trade unionist.

He entered in to politics in 1958, becoming a prominent figure in the new radical Chadian National Union (UNT), mainly a split from the African Socialist Movement (MSA) by promoters of the No-vote in the referendum on Chad's entry in the French Community. The party's followers were all Muslims, and advocated Pan-Africanism and socialism. Towards the end of the colonial rule Abatcha was jailed for a year either for his political activities or for mismanagement in the performance of his duties.

He and his party staunchly opposed after independence in 1960 the rule of President François Tombalbaye, and the UNT was banned with all other opposition parties on January 19, 1962. After that Abatcha was briefly imprisoned by the new Chadian government.

== In exile ==
After his release, the UNT cadres decided that if the political situation in Chad became too unbearable to allow the party to survive, it would be wise to send some party members out of the country so that the organization would in any case maintain its existence. Thus Abatcha, who held the position of second adjutant secretary-general of the UNT, was sent in 1963 to Accra, Ghana, where he was later joined by UNT members Aboubakar Djalabo and Mahamat Ali Taher. By going into exile the UNT members also meant to ensure their personal safety and organize abroad an armed revolt in Chad. Abartcha proclaimed the Islamic Republic of Chad in exile and wrote and published a Maoist-oriented political statement entitled Toward a United National Liberation Front, which would serve as a kind of draft of the official program of the future FROLINAT. In this statement Abatcha declared class war, war against Tombalbaye, against Western imperialism and against French neocolonialism and called for the Islamic revolution.

Abatcha led the typical life of the Third World dissident in search of support in foreign capitals, first residing in Accra, Ghana, where he received his first military training and made friends among members of the Union of the Peoples of Cameroon that had found asylum there. These Cameroonians helped him attend conferences organized by international Communist groups.

After leaving Accra in 1965, Abatcha started wandering to other African capitals always searching support for his project of beginning an insurgency against Tombalbaye. The first capital he reached in 1965 was Algiers, where the UNT had already a representative, probably Djalabo. His attempts were unsuccessful, as were those made from there to persuade the Chadian students in France to join him in his fight. From there he traveled to Cairo, where a small secret committee of anti-government Chadian students of the Al-Azhar University had formed. The students in Cairo had developed a strong political sensitivity because they had come to resent that the degrees obtained by them in Arab countries were of no use in Chad, as French was the only official language. Among these students Abatcha recruited his first supporters, and with the help of the UPC Cameroonian exiles contacted the North Korean embassy in Egypt, which offered him a military stage. Seven Cairo students volunteered, leaving Egypt in June 1965 and returning in October; these were to be with Abatcha the first military cadres of the rebels. Abatcha with his "Koreans" went then to Sudan in October 1965.

Once in Sudan Abatcha found fertile ground for further recruitment, as many Chadian refugees lived there. Abatcha was also able to enroll in his movement former Sudanese soldiers, including a few officers, of whom the most distinguished was to become Hadjaro Senoussi. He also contacted Mohamed Baghlani, who was in communication with the first Chadian insurgents already active in Chad, and with the insurgent group Liberation Front of Chad (FLT).

== Creation of the FROLINAT ==
This merger was negotiated during the congress at Nyala between June 19 and June 22, 1966, in which the UNT and another rebel force, the Liberation Front of Chad (FLT) combined, giving birth to the FROLINAT, whose first secretary-general was agreed to be Abatcha. The two groups were ideologically ill-fitted, as they combined the radicalism of the UNT and the Muslim beliefs of the FLT. FLT's president, Ahmed Hassan Musa, missed the conference because he was imprisoned in Khartoum; Musa suspected with some reason that Abatcha had deliberately chosen the moment of his incarceration to organize the conference due to his fear of FLT's numerical superiority over the UNT. As a result, once freed Musa broke with the FROLINAT, the first of many splits that were to plague the history of the organization. Thus Abatcha had to face from the beginning a level of considerable internal strife, with the opposition guided by the anti-communist Mohamed Baghlani.

The unity was stronger on the field, with Abatcha and his so-called Koreans passing to Eastern Chad in mid-1966 to fight the government, and El Hadj Issaka assuming the role of his chief of staff. While his maquis were badly trained and equipped, they were able to commit some hit-and-run attacks against the Chadian army, mainly in Ouaddai, but also in Guera and Salamat. The rebels also toured the villages, indoctrinating the people on the future revolution and exhorting youths to join the FROLINAT forces.

The following year Abatcha expanded his range and number of operations, officially claiming in his dispatches 32 actions, involving prefectures previously untouched by the rebellion, that is Moyen-Chari and Kanem. Mainly due to Abatcha's qualities as both secretary-general and field-commander, what had started in 1965 as a peasant uprising was becoming a revolutionary movement.

== Abatcha's death ==
On January 20, 1968, his men killed on the Goz Beida-Abéché road a Spanish veterinary and a French doctor, while they took hostage a French nurse. Abatcha disavowed this action and ordered his men to free the nurse, but due to these actions, on February 11, he was tracked down by the Chadian army and killed in a clash.

Abatcha's death was the end of an important phase in the history of the FROLINAT and more generally of the rebellion. Abatcha had been the one generally acceptable leader of the insurrection; after him the FROLINAT was more and more divided by inner rivalries, making it more difficult to provide the insurgents with a coherent organization.
