= Liberation Front of Chad =

- Leader: Ahmed Hassan Musa †
- Dates active: 1965–1976
- Headquarters: Nyala
- Active regions: Chad; Sudan
- Ideology: Islamic fundamentalism
- Wars: the Chadian Civil War (1965–1979)

The Liberation Front of Chad (Front de Libération du Tchad or FLT) was an insurgent group active between 1965 and 1976 during the first phase of the Chadian Civil War.

It was founded in Sudan by Ahmed Hassan Musa, an Islamic fundamentalist close to the Muslim Brotherhood who was leader of the General Union of the Children of Chad (Union Générale des Fils du Tchad or UGFT), an Islamic traditionalist party composed of exiles in Sudan, whose adherents were always recruited mostly among Ouaddaians. On September 7, Mussa with his UGFT followers created the Liberation Front of Chad (FLT), the first insurgent group formed to fight the Tombalbaye Regime; that the times were ready for an insurgent group was fully understood a month later, when the Mangalmé riots started the civil war.

The next year the FLT united with Ibrahim Abatcha's Chadian National Union (UNT) at the Congress of Nyala in Sudan between June 19 and 22. The new organization created was called National Liberation Front of Chad (FROLINAT); Abatcha was secretary-general and it was governed by a thirty-member committee equally composed of UNT and FLT members.

A part of the FLT under the leadership of Mussa restaked its autonomy already in late 1966; based in Sudan, it operated on the Chad-Sudan border, but never represented a true danger for the Chadian government, especially when confronted with the FROLINAT.

When Tombalbaye was overthrown in the 1975 coup, and Félix Malloum's new government made overtures to the insurgent groups, the FLT was one of the few that answered and came to terms with the central authorities in 1976, signing the end of the FLT's armed fight.
