= Kano Accord =

The Kano Accord was preceded by the collapse of central authority in Chad in 1979, when the Prime Minister, Hissène Habré, had unleashed his militias on February 12 against the capital N'Djamena and the sitting president, Félix Malloum. To tackle the President's forces, Habré had allied himself with the rival warlord Goukouni Oueddei, who entered N'Djamena on February 22 at the head of his People's Armed Forces (FAP).

The situation alarmed the country's neighbours, worried of a possible spill-over; as a result, already on February 16 the Sudanese minister Izz Eldine Hamed had arrived in N'Djamena where he negotiated a ceasefire among the rival factions. The Sudanese proposed organizing a peace conference on neutral territory, and Nigeria's President Olusegun Obasanjo offered Kano, in Northern Nigeria, as the venue for the conference. He also invited as observers Chad's neighbouring countries (Libya, Sudan, Cameroon, Central African Republic, Niger).

The conference started with some days of delay on March 11, with the arrival of Malloum, Habré, Goukouni and Aboubakar Abdel Rahmane. Among the four, Malloum represented the French-backed national government, Habré and Goukouni the county's biggest insurgent forces, while Aboubakar, leader of a minor insurgent group, the Popular Movement for the Liberation of Chad (MPLT), could count on the support of Nigeria.

These four signed the Kano Accord on National Reconciliation on March 16, and it became effective on March 23, when Malloum and Habré formally resigned. The six points of the accord were:

- The demilitarization of N'Djamena
- An amnesty for all political prisoners
- Dissolution of the militias
- Formation of a new national army
- Pull-out of French troops
- Nigerian forces would supervise the ceasefire

It also projected the foundation of a Transitional Government of National Unity (GUNT), which would have governed Chad till new elections. Malloum and Habré were excluded from the GUNT, but all of the four factions present at the conference would have two ministries in the Provvisional State Council that would govern in Chad till the full establishment of the GUNT. Goukouni was to be President of this Council.

The French troops, present in Chad from 1978, were to leave the country and be substituted with a multi-national African peacekeeping force under the aegis of the Organisation of African Unity (OAU), represented principally by Nigerian troops.

The Kano Accord was a failure, for it offended Libyan interests by excluding pro-Libyan factions like Abba Siddick's "Original FROLINAT" and Ahmat Acyl's Volcan Army, that menaced to form a counter-government if excluded from the GUNT. This brought Nigerians to search a new accord that would include a major number of factions; and from this was to emerge the Lagos Accord, signed on August 21 in the Nigerian city of Lagos, which took the place of the Kano Accord.

== See also ==
- FROLINAT
- Civil war in Chad (1965–1979)
