= Popular Movement for the Liberation of Chad =

The Popular Movement for the Liberation of Chad (Mouvement Populaire pour la Libération du Tchad or MPLT) was a small rebel group active in Chad during the civil war.

It was born in 1977 as a splinter group from Goukouni Oueddei's People's Armed Forces (FAP), and originally assumed the name of Third Liberation Army of the FROLINAT. The formation originated from the expulsion of Aboubakar Abdel Rahmane from the Comité Militaire Interarmées Provisoire (CMIAP) of the FAP: he had protested against the bias in favour of the Borkou-Ennedi-Tibesti and the neglect in which the Kanem region was kept. Expelled, Abdel Rahmane, a semi-illiterate Kanembu, recruited some following among his people and became active around Lake Chad, in the Kanem area.

In 1978 it became internationally known when it took as hostages two young Europeans who were travelling in the region; the action caused an outcry to which all other factions participated, bringing in short to the release of the prisoners, especially thanks to the intermediation of Nigeria. This country had become the best supporter of the movement, even if it is not clear to what extent did this support arrive.

The group assumed the name of Popular Movement for the Liberation of Chad in mid-February 1979. It can be reasonably supposed that Nigerian support was decisive in understanding its invitation at the Kano Peace Conference organized by Nigeria between March 11 and March 16, 1979 to put an end to the anarchy that was devouring Chad from February 12, when the central government had started collapsing. The first three invited, Félix Malloum, Hissène Habré, Goukouni, were obvious, as they represented respectively the government and the countries two greatest militias (FAN and FAP); but Abdel Rahmane led only a very minor force, even he had tried to swell it by recruiting among the criminal element of N'Djamena, thing that is said to have acquired the MPLT a solid reputation for looting.

Nigeria needed the MPLT so that it could press through its voice for an "African solution" and the immediate withdrawal of the French forces present in Chad; and both goals were obtained with the Kano Accord, signed by the four factions on March 16, which spoke of the pull-out of all foreign troops and the arrival of a peace-keeping inter-African force guided by Nigeria. A Provvisional State Council was formed to governed, with all signers taking two ministers; in particular, President was Goukouni while Abdel Rahmane became Minister of the Interior. On April 29 a Transitional Government of National Unity (GUNT) took its place, and an MPLT man, Lol Mahamat Choua, became president, through heavy interferences from Nigeria. But he didn't remain long; strong opposition from the factions excluded by the Kano Accord brought on September 3, to a new GUNT government, in which all factions were represented, with Goukouni was President on the basis of the new Lagos Accord.

In 1979 Abdel Rahmane died. This may have played a part in engineering the split within the MPLT, in which another mainly Kanembu militia was formed, the Western Armed Forces (FAO), led by Moussa Medela, that deflected some of the MPLT's Nigerian support.

The MPLT, reduced to a shadow of its former self, as the FAO remained in armed opposition to Habré since his ascent to power in 1982, and is reported to have been still in the opposition in 1988; after this, the militia apparently plays no more role in Chad and disappears.
