= Chadian Civil War (1965–1979) =

Rebellion against Presidents François Tombalbaye and Félix Malloum

- Part of the Cold War
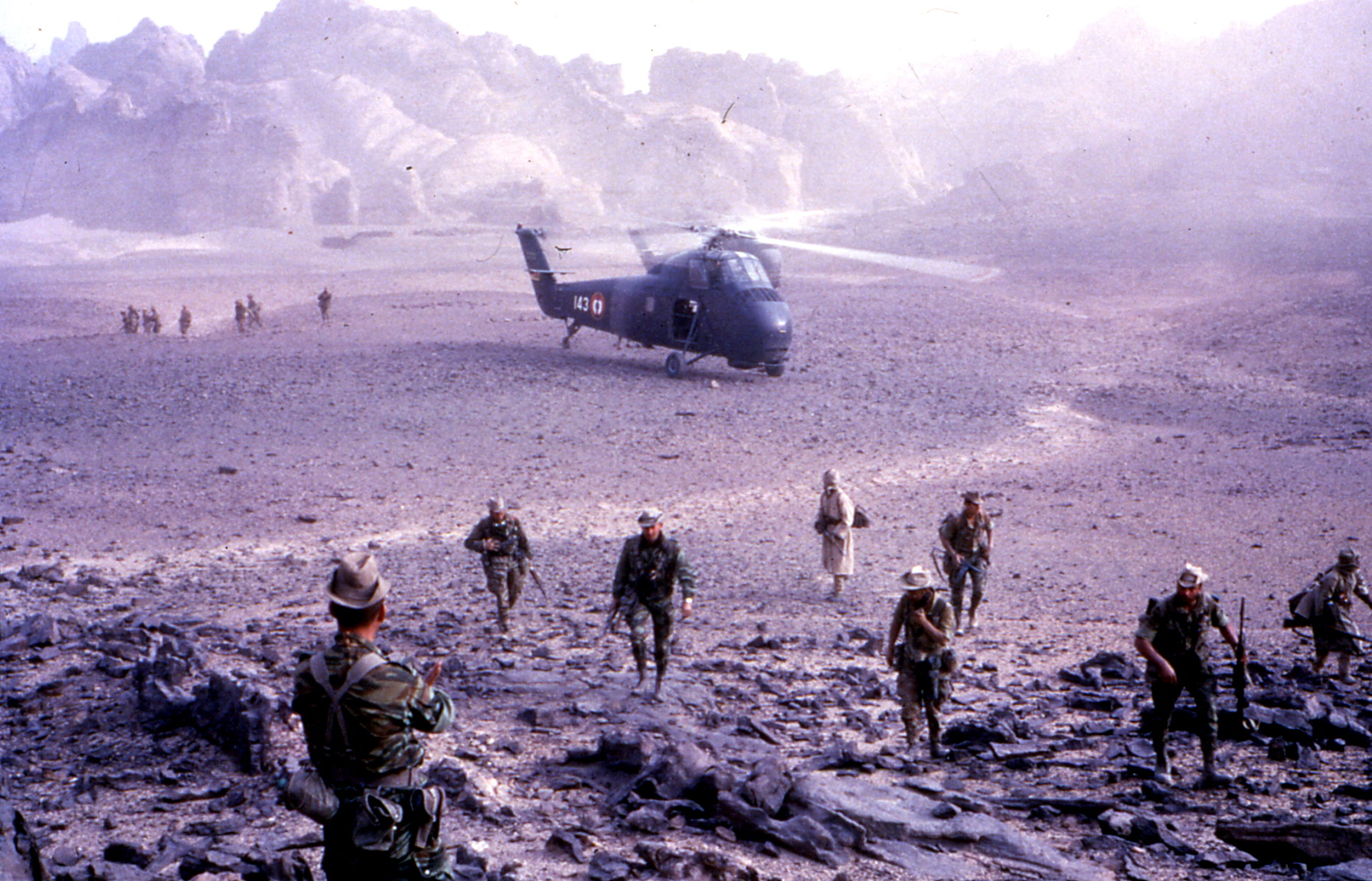
- French Navy helicopter and French paratroopers during a 1971 operation in Chad
Date	1 November 1965 – November 1979
Location	Chad
Result	Rebel victory: Overthrow and death of François Tombalbaye in 1975; Overthrow of Félix Malloum in 1979; Signing of Lagos Accord and installation of Transitional Government of National Unity

Belligerents
FROLINAT (from 1966): First Liberation Army (until 1975); Second Liberation Army (1968–76); Third Liberation Army (from 1968); Various splinter factions; (Chad) FLT (until 1975) (Chad) Volcan Army (from 1970) (Chad) FAP (from 1976) (Chad) FAN (1976–78, 1979); Tribal and peasant rebels (Libyan Arab Republic) (History of Libya under Muammar Gaddafi) Libya (1969–72, from 1975); Supported by: Algeria; Kingdom of Libya (non-combat, until 1969)	Chad: Chadian Armed Forces; FROLINAT's First Liberation Army (c. 1975); FAN (1978–79); France; Supported by: Egypt; Israel

Commanders and leaders
Ibrahim Abatcha † (FROLINAT); Abba Siddick (FROLINAT) (Chad) Hissène Habré (FROLINAT, Second Liberation Army, Third Liberation Army, FAN) (Chad) Goukouni Oueddei (FROLINAT, Second Liberation Army, FAP) (Chad) Ahmat Acyl (FROLINAT, First Liberation Army; Volcan Army) (Chad) Mohamed Baghlani (Volcan Army) (Libyan Arab Republic) (History of Libya under Muammar Gaddafi) Muammar al-Gaddafi	(Chad) François Tombalbaye † (Chad) Félix Malloum (Chad) Ahmat Acyl (First Liberation Army) (Chad) Hissène Habré (FAN) (France) Michel Arnaud (France) Edouard Cortadellas

Strength
3,000 (FROLINAT, 1966); 2,000 (FAN, 1978)	1,200 Armed Forces, 700 Gendarmerie, 120 French (1968); 11,000 (1979)

The Chadian Civil War of 1965–1979 (French: Guerre civile tchadienne de 1965–1979) was waged by several rebel factions against two Chadian governments. The initial rebellion erupted in opposition to Chadian President François Tombalbaye, whose regime was marked by authoritarianism, extreme corruption, and favoritism. In 1975 Tombalbaye was murdered by his own army, and a military government headed by Félix Malloum emerged and continued the war against the insurgents. Following foreign interventions by Libya and France, the fracturing of the rebels into rival factions, and an escalation of the fighting, Malloum stepped down in March 1979. This paved the way for a new national government, known as "Transitional Government of National Unity" (GUNT).

Following the rise of GUNT, a new phase of civil war and international conflict broke out in Chad.

== Background ==
=== Political situation in Chad ===
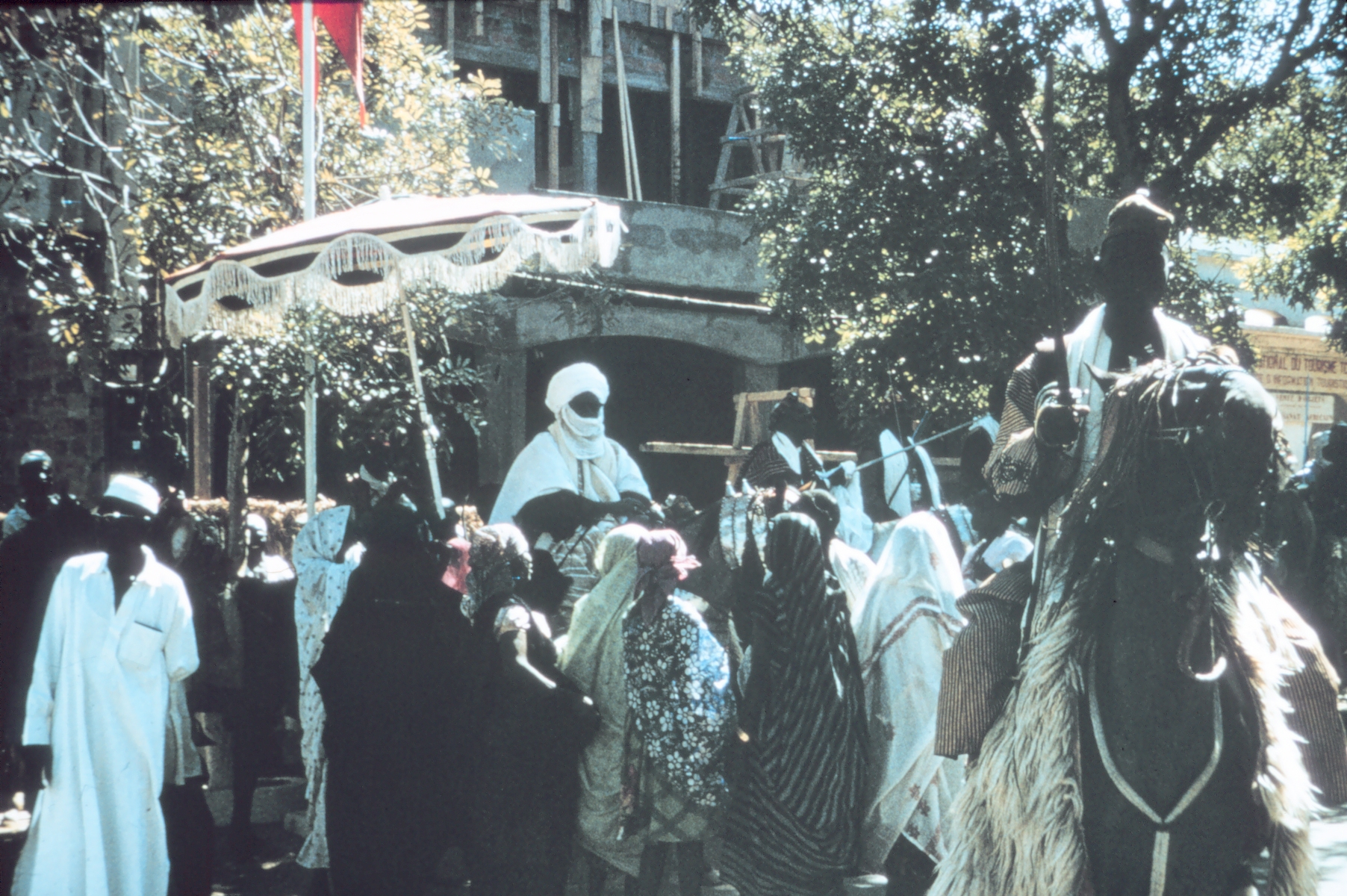
Chadian notables in the 1960s. President François Tombalbaye undermined traditional local leaders, causing resentment that contributed to the civil war.

Chad gained independence from France in August 1960. The state was left with minimal infrastructure; there were no paved roads or railways. In the northern Borkou-Ennedi-Tibesti (BET) region and much of the centre-east, government presence was restricted to a handful of towns. Economically, it relied on cotton exports and French subsidies. Chad was sparsely populated but ethnically, it was highly diverse. In addition, the country was divided by religion; about 50% of the people were Muslims, most of them living in the north and east, whereas Christians and animists dominated the south. Constitutionally, the country was bequeathed a parliamentary system, though this quickly morphed into a dictatorship. The country's first president, François Tombalbaye, was a southerner whose government quickly proved to be corrupt, granting favors to his political supporters in the south while marginalizing the rest of Chad. Tensions and discontent consequently grew, especially as Tombalbaye undermined traditional local leaders who still held great respect among the people and became increasingly authoritarian.

By January 1962, Tombalbaye had banned all political parties except his own Chadian Progressive Party (PPT). His treatment of opponents, real or imagined, was extremely harsh, filling the prisons with thousands of political prisoners. Civilian demonstrations on 16 September 1963 were crushed by the Chadian Armed Forces, resulting in between 19 and 100 deaths. Several opposition groups began organising resistance, though the first attempted insurgencies were easily suppressed by Tombalbaye's forces. Many opposition leaders fled to neighboring Sudan, where they began to prepare for a full rebellion.

=== Chadian Armed Forces and French support ===
The Chadian Armed Forces were formed by Chadian veterans of the French colonial military, and continued to receive training and equipment from France. In 1964 the Chadian Army consisted of 500 soldiers trained by 200 Frenchmen. From independence until 1979, the Chadian Army was overwhelmingly dominated by Sara southerners. Few northerners joined, and initially there were only two northerners in the officer corps. From the 1960s to 1979, the armed forces consisted of four branches: the Territorial Guard/National and Nomadic Guard, which was responsible for controlling the north of the country; the Sûreté Nationale, which was to secure the borders, mitigate crime, and protect the President; the Gendarmerie, which acted as a police force; and the Chadian Army, which consisted of four battalions. The Gendarmerie was the best-trained of all the branches. There was also a small Chadian Air Force and a naval force that operated on Lake Chad. Until 1975 the Territorial Guard and Sûreté Nationale answered to the Ministry of Interior, while the Gendarmerie and Army were overseen by the Ministry of Defence.

France maintained a significant military presence in Chad. As was common with many of its former African colonies, France and Chad had signed a military assistance agreement and a mutual defence pact. These accords included a secret provision which allowed Chad to request direct French military intervention in the event they were needed to ensure the domestic "maintenance of order". Under such circumstances, French military officers would take command of Chadian forces. The French embassy in Fort-Lamy also kept a signed, undated letter from Tombalbaye requesting protection in case his personal safety was jeopardised. In 1965, the French military had 1,000 troops in Chad, while French personnel permeated Chadian security institutions. The Air Force's pilots were almost all French until 1975. The military and intelligence service were headed by Frenchmen: Colonel Leverest commanded the Chadian Army, Adjutant-Chef Albert Gelino headed the Gendarmerie, and Camille Gourvennec led the main intelligence office, the Bureau de Coordination et de Synthèse du Renseignement (BCSR). These men were ruthless in regards to their readiness to violently suppress dissidents in Chad, and appreciated by the Chadian government as well as the French government. The heavy French involvement in Chad led to accusations of neocolonialism. While their presence aided Tombalbaye, his relationship with the French government was often tenuous.

== War ==
=== Outbreak of conflict ===
French military officers oversaw the government in the BET until January 1965, when they were withdrawn. They were replaced by southern bureaucrats who had little knowledge of local culture and committed abuses, engendering alienation from the state among the locals. In September 1965 a Chadian soldier was killed in Bardaï, Tibesti in a fight following a dance. The local subprefect reacted harshly, having all the townspeople assembled and paraded nude. Nine people were arrested, including Toubou derde Oueddei Kichidemi and his son, Goukouni Oueddei. The local administration thereafter imposed restrictions on wearing turbans, growing beards, and assembling in groups. Resentful of this treatment, the residents of Bardaï rebelled.

Meanwhile, unrest grew in rural areas over issues of taxation. Tombalbaye attempted to buttress the paltry resources of his government by raising revenue, leading to tax increases and the collection of a "national loan" in 1964. Many Chadians were often confused to see tax collectors return to them to ask for the "loan" payments. Embezzlement of tax revenue and the forceful measures of the collectors generated resentment. The situation climaxed on 1 November 1965, when intense riots broke out in Mangalmé, Guéra prefecture that left over 500 people dead, including a representative to the National Assembly and nine other public officials. The riots—together with the revolt in Bardaï—marked the general start of widespread rebellion in Chad; the tax riots are usually considered the beginning of the civil war. Afterwards, spontaneous peasant revolts erupted throughout Guéra. By 1966 these had spread to Wadai Prefecture. Near Lake Fitri, there were open clashes between civilians and government forces. According to unconfirmed French reports, the Chadian Army torched villages and killed 250–400 people. Locals stated that soldiers bound alleged tax evaders and beat them to death. Chadian officials, fearing for their safety, rarely left their offices, diminishing administration in rural areas and further reducing tax revenue. Despite the financial problems, Tombalbaye pushed for increased defence expenditures in the 1966 budget.

Also in 1966, the Chadian government attempted to mandate the cultivation of food crops in the BET in an attempt to force the local nomads to "sedentarise". The Toubou disliked this treatment, and derde Oueddei asked for a delay in the implementation of the measure. The Chadian authorities attempted to arrest him. In December he and 1,000 of his followers fled to Libya. Oueddei's position as derde had been contested since he assumed the role in 1938, but Chadian actions in the BET led the Toubou to unify in his support. Three of his sons stayed behind and armed themselves against the authorities.

=== Founding of FROLINAT ===
As revolts spread throughout the countryside, some local leaders coalesced the resistance into small groups. On 22 June 1966, 24 delegates from various Chadian opposition groups met in Nyala, Sudan and founded the National Liberation Front of Chad (FROLINAT). The new organisation was a union of the Union Nationale Tchadienne (UNT) led by Ibrahim Abatcha, and the Mouvement National de Libération du Tchad (MNLT) led by Ahmed Hassan Musa. Musa was in prison in Sudan at the time, and Abatcha became FROLINAT's first leader. Though the organisation's leaders were mostly Muslims, some of its members were secularists. Abatcha was a committed socialist and FROLINAT adopted a left-leaning political platform—designed to attract the support of Arab socialist governments and the Eastern Bloc—and called for the institution of Arabic as an official language of Chad. FROLINAT hoped to secure the backing of Chad's Arab diaspora and Chadian expatriate university students; many of its earliest supporters were students in Cairo.

Following FROLINAT's founding, Abatcha and seven recruited students who had received military training in North Korea traveled into the Chadian interior to recruit new members and link FROLINAT with the local revolts. The organisation grew its ranks by taking advantage of anti-government sentiment caused by repression of unrelated rebellions. Abatcha tapped El Hajj Issaka, a deposed customary chief who had organised resistance in Dar Sila, as his top military commander. Mohammed El Baghalani became Abatcha's main representative in Sudan. Both men were much more conservative than Abatcha, and Baghalani preferred to appeal to the conservative Persian Gulf Arab states for materiel support rather than Egypt or other socialist states—to some success. Nevertheless, the diversity of political philosophies in FROLINAT laid the groundwork for future divisions; over time the rebels increasingly split into factions, headed by independent-minded commanders and backed by different ethnic groups. Abatcha's leadership was able to give FROLINAT some cohesiveness. However, Musa's faction broke off again soon after FROLINAT's founding, forming the independent Front de Libération du Tchad (FLT). The FLT never managed to gain much traction, and operated more akin to bandits in parts of eastern Chad such as Wadai.

The rebels also enjoyed covert support from the Kingdom of Libya, which claimed parts of northern Chad. However King Idris of Libya had no desire to clash with the French who backed Tombalbaye; accordingly the Libyans initially limited themselves to providing non-combat support such as nonlethal supplies and bases. However, the monarchy was overthrown in 1969, and Muammar Gaddafi assumed power in Libya. Gaddafi greatly increased Libyan support for the rebels, including supplying them with weapons. One of FROLINAT's leaders, Mahamat Ali Taher, went to Libya to meet with derde Oueddei to convince him to openly rebel against the government. Once this was done, Taher mobilised Toubou exiles for insurgent activities.

By 1967 FROLINAT had grown to become the most significant group in the rebellion. It established footholds in Batha, Salamat, Wadai, and Guéra prefectures, where its members plotted the assassination of government officials and ambushed army detachments. French observers stated that the insurgents aimed to aggravate Muslim resentment of black Chadians and prevent the government from collecting taxes. The lack of tax revenue forced Tombalbaye to cut expenditures, undermining administration and lowering the morale of civil servants. The president also attempted to ease local grievances by replacing Sara bureaucrats with Muslims. Frustrated at the army's inability to suppress rebellion in central Chad, he created the Compagnies Tchadiennes de Securité (CTS), an Israeli-trained unit under his personal control. By 1968, Tombalbaye's military forces consisted of the 1,200-strong Chadian Army, the 700-strong Gendarmerie, the National and Nomadic Guard, and 120 French soldiers. The president never completely trusted the regular army, and frequently characterised it as poorly motivated, undisciplined, and ill-trained. He used Moroccans as his personal bodyguards, while French, Israeli, and Congolese personnel were used to train new recruits rather than Chadians. The French and Congolese were also responsible for equipping some Chadian formations.

=== First French intervention and death of Abatcha ===
On 11 February 1968, FROLINAT leader Abatcha was killed in combat at Abéché. Though it caused political problems within FROLINAT, Abatcha's death did not restrain the growth of rebellion. Shortly thereafter Issaka took command of FROLINAT's First Liberation Army. The following month Tobou members of a Nomadic Guard contingent near the northern town of Aouzou mutinied and joined rebels in besieging the locale. The Chadian Army mounted several relief expeditions from Bardaï, but were ultimately unsuccessful. Unable to stay the advances of FRONILAT in the BET and Wadai, Tombalbaye requested French military support under the terms of the Franco-Chad military agreements. President Charles de Gaulle promptly agreed, and France quickly organised an expeditionary force with the goal "to make possible the reinstallation of Chadian administration in the BET". Neither Tombalbaye nor the French sought to completely suppress the rebellion; the former feared the political fallout of brutal repression in the north, while the latter wished to avoid an expensive and drawn out conflict. The French intervention began in August with the arrival of a small contingent, though by its end three months later the force totaled 2,000 marines. These troops came in support of aircraft, as De Gaulle did not want to use French soldiers to recapture Aouzou. French A4 Skyraiders were deployed to the BET to provide air support to Chadian ground forces while transport aircraft conducted parachute drops to resupply the Aouzou garrison. The Chadian Army eventually reached Aouzou and relieved the town without conflict, while the Toubou rebels fled intact into the Tibetsi Mountains. Tombalbaye wanted his forces to remain in the northern town, but the relief column quickly withdrew with the garrison to avoid being attacked in an isolated position. Tombalbaye subsequently tasked Pierre Galopin with opening negotiations with the Toubou insurgents. With Aouzou and the surrounding area abandoned by the Chadian Army, Libyan forces began paying "unofficial visits" in the area, distributing gifts and Libyan passports to the populace.

Though Aouzou had been relieved, rebel groups took advantage of Chad's rainy season to grow their strength. From roughly April to October, the rain prevented government vehicles from transporting security forces across the Sahel. FROLINAT and other factions were thus able to establish themselves in Mongo, Guéra Prefecture and in Bousso, Chari-Baguirmi prefecture, both relatively close to the capital. Conflict between security forces and insurgents was brutal. Rebels abducted and murdered village leaders, robbed and mutilated traders, destroyed infrastructure, and attacked communities suspected of sympathising with the government. For their part, Chadian forces killed numerous civilians, held public executions of insurgents and "sympathisers", and in at least one case burnt a village in Wadai for the alleged rebel sympathies of its populace. Rebels were sometimes able to inflict serious losses on the security forces, but in direct conflict the Chadian troops usually inflicted greater losses on the insurgents.

Meanwhile, Abatcha's death caused a violent succession struggle among FROLINAT, with Abba Siddick becoming the new leader after eliminating some of his rivals in October 1969. Baghalani was expelled from the movement by Siddick's allies for supposedly engaging in graft, and went on to lead his own militia near the Sudanese border. Issaka was dismissed from his military role in June 1970 and murdered two years later. However, Siddick's favoritism and leadership style made him unpopular, and other frontline rebel commanders gradually broke away, organizing factions backed by certain regions and ethnicities. The two largest factions gradually transformed into the First Liberation Army of Ahmat Acyl, mainly consisting of Chadian Arabs and operating in the east, and the Second Liberation Army which was composed mainly of Toubou, campaigned in the west and north, and was headed by Goukouni Oueddei and Hissène Habré. The Second Liberation Army was completely autonomous, while the First Liberation Army initially maintained at least a tenuous loyalty to Siddick's command. However, the First Liberation Army included several separatist and Islamist sub-factions which later formed their own groups such as "FROLINAT-Fundamental", "FROLINAT-Orthodoxe", and the Volcan Army. In addition, the Third Liberation Army led by Mohammad Abu Baker Mustafa emerged in Kanem.

By early 1969, Chadian administration in the centre and east was collapsing. The loss of tax revenue and increased military spending rendered Tombalbaye's regime close to insolvency. French officials began to fear that the rebellion was directly threatening the presidency. On 10 March Tombalbaye requested French air support after a surprise attack on a Gendarmerie unit. De Gaulle felt that "there is no way of solving this kind of problem by dropping bombs on peasants" but concluded he had to offer assistance to the Chadian president. He decided that the best way of mitigating Tombalbaye's problems involved a French takeover of the Chadian military as well as an extensive program of administrative reform to be supervised by French civil servants. Yvon Bourges formally approached the Chadian president with the offer, the terms of which were not negotiable. Tombalbaye was relieved that he would be receiving assistance but stunned by the scope of the project. He feared that it would be seen as a recolonisation of Chad, while members of his government were irked by the possibility of French administrators subsuming their powers.

=== Second French intervention and splintering of FROLINAT ===
The second, larger intervention was launched by the French in April 1969. The military component of the project was later dubbed Operation Limousin. The civilian component primarily comprised the Mission pour la réforme administrative (MRA), headed by former colonial governor Pierre Lami. The MRA posted French advisors to all prefects and subprefects in troubled areas. They were made responsible for tax collection and could veto the decisions of local administrators. The entire BET was taken over by a French military administration. The mission also emphasised the restoration of "traditional chiefdoms" in the north. As for military matters, a unified command of all Chadian security forces was placed under the direction of French general Michel Arnaud, who was officially named Délégué militaire (military delegate). Dozens of French military officers and non-commissioned officers were dispatched to help train and restructure the Chadian military, as well as assume direct command over Chadian units when necessary. Several infantry companies, mainly from the Foreign Legion, were also deployed to reinforce the French military presence and assist Chadian forces.

In the 1969 Chadian presidential election Tombalbaye was reelected unopposed. The president created a new system of village militias which the MRA subsequently armed with MAS-36 rifles and hunting rifles. Tensions quickly developed within the French intervention force and between French and Chadian officials. Arnaud received competing directives from the French Cooperation and Defence ministries, complicating his mission. He also wanted to deploy French forces in search-and-destroy operations, though this became difficult as FROLINAT tried to avoid direct confrontations. Some of his subordinates argued that French forces should instead garrison much of rural Chad to intimidate the population and enforce central authority. Furthermore, Arnaud objected to the scorched earth tactics favored by Chadian officers. The tensions between Aranud and the Chadians peaked in an August meeting when he entered a shouting match with Tombalbaye. The Chadian president ordered him to kill 15,000 Arabs in communities he believed were supporting the rebellion. Arnaud thought the request was absurd and refused to accede to it. Troubled by this and the problems within the French intervention, Ambassador Fernand Wibaux asked the French government to withdraw Arnaud. In late September General Edouard Cortadellas replaced Arnaud as Délégué militaire. Cortadellas was an elderly officer nearing retirement with counterinsurgency experience gleaned from campaigns in Indochina and Algeria. In early November FROLINAT launched a coordinated offensive in central and eastern Chad, capturing some outposts and defeating isolated detachments. After two weeks, the Franco-Chadian forces initiated their counteroffensive. With enhanced mobility provided by French transport helicopters, they quickly reversed FROLINAT's advances. Despite limited equipment and supplies, the French inflicted devastating losses upon FROLINAT throughout late 1969 and early 1970.

The French successfully blunted FROLINAT's advances into the south and recaptured some of their territory in the north. Rebel activity in the BET, specifically Tibetsi, was diminished. The morale of the Chadian Armed Forces was left substantially improved in engagements with the rebels. Conversely, FROLINAT's losses left it internally disorganised and susceptible to outside influence. The French were reportedly aided in their campaign through the use of napalm, though the French military has denied that it was ever employed. The intervention officially terminated in June 1971. By then combined Chadian and French military actions had killed between 2,000 and 10,000 people, including civilians, and destroyed many palm groves in the north. About 1,200 French military personnel remained afterwards to provide training to the approximately 2,700 members of the Chadian Army. Between May 1969 and August 1972, 50 French soldiers were killed fighting rebels.

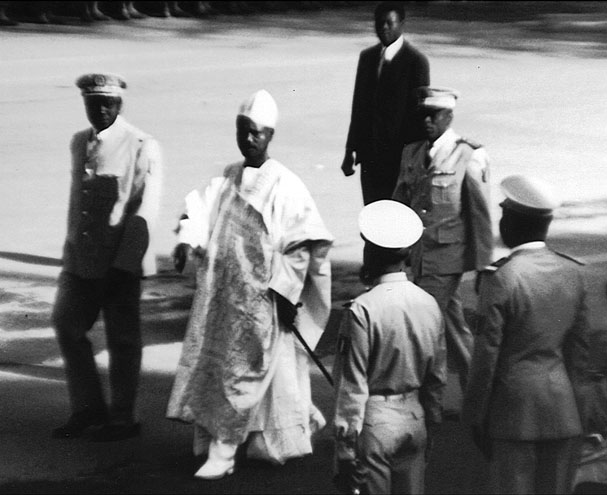
President François Tombalbaye with military officers during a parade in 1970

Though most of the rebels were either suppressed by the intervention or had rallied to the government, the state's control of rural areas remained weak. Eager to avoid another crisis which would lead to calls for another intervention, the French pushed for the Chadian government to implement reforms that would generate reconciliation and ease inter-regional relations. At these urgings, the Chadian government opened negotiations with local chiefs, improved tax collection, and released some political prisoners. Nevertheless, the reforms failed to improve underlying weaknesses within the economy or ease the political climate. Tombalbaye continued to rule Chad unabated as a one-party state, though he stressed national reconciliation and reshuffled his cabinet to include more Muslims and northerners.

In 1970, around 200 Libyan dissidents based in Chad launched a raid against Sabha to destabilize Gaddafi's government and facilitate a coup. This operation, known as the "Black Prince conspiracy" due to the involvement of Prince Abdallah al-Abid al Senussi, greatly influenced Gaddafi's perception of Chad as potential threat to his rule. Observers suspected that Gaddafi's declared enemy Israel had been involved in the coup attempt; Israeli Mossad agents were still training the Chadian CTS at this point. This contributed to Gaddafi's "obsession" with Chad, and he began to consider Tombalbaye a "tool" of "Israeli imperialism".

In August 1971, parts of the Chadian military launched a coup attempt against Tombalbaye with Libyan support. Government reform ceased, and Tombalbaye severed relations with Libya while inviting anti-Gaddafi Libyans to establish themselves in Chad. Gaddafi retaliated by increasing materiel support to FROLINAT and allowing Siddick to set up a base in Tripoli. In November 1971 disaffected students in Fort-Lamy went on strike. The unrest was easily suppressed, but in response the president replaced the army chief of staff General Jacques Doumro—well-liked by the students—with Colonel Felix Malloum. The army itself remained poorly equipped, relying on a handful of armed scout cars and 60mm and 81mm mortars. The Air Force only fielded several transport planes and a helicopter.

In 1972 Tombalbaye was beset with a financial crisis, a drought, factionalism in the government, and civil unrest. The situation came to a head in June when Libyan-backed rebels were arrested while trying to smuggle weapons into the capital. This caused the president to drastically alter his policies. Abandoning national reconciliation, he arrested over 1,000 alleged "enemies of the state", including hundreds of southerners, and dismissed two southern ministers from his cabinet. He also completely reoriented his foreign policy to secure economic assistance from Arab states and marginalize FRONILAT. He severed diplomatic ties with Israel in September and, a few months later, got Libya to offer Chad CFA 23 billion in aid. Tombalbaye also ceded the disputed Aouzou Strip to Libya in return for promises by Gaddafi to stop supporting FROLINAT. Despite helping Tombalbaye in containing the insurgency, the deal with Libya greatly damaged his reputation within the military, which, proud of its success in fighting FROLINAT, sought to assert itself in national politics. Tombalbaye was unhappy with the regular army's inability to completely quell the insurgency, and in turn increased the size of other branches of the armed forces. Some analysts believe that the deal with Libya made him feel assured about the security of the country's territory from foreign aggression, and thus he saw the army as less useful and more of a threat to his own authority.

Meanwhile, on 1 September 1972 Cortadellas retired from his post and flew back to France, handing over all command of Chadian military forces to Malloum. The French and Chadian government treated his retirement as signaling the end of direct French intervention in the civil war. The remaining military advisers were either directly integrated into the Chadian Armed Forces or incorporated into the garrisons of France's three military bases in the country at Fort-Lamy, Mongo, and Largeau.

In addition, Oueddei fully broke away from Siddick's forces in 1971, starting a process that culminated in the complete fracturing of FROLINAT. The loss of Libyan aid in 1972 led to direct fighting between the First Liberation Army and Second Liberation Army for supplies. Over the next years, numerous larger and smaller splinter groups emerged, while Siddick was left with a minor and quasi-powerless faction known as "FROLINAT-Originel" from 1974 on. With the rebels weakened due to internal disagreements and reduced Libyan support, the French launched Operation Languedoc in early 1972 to crush the First Liberation Army in the east. The latter had been reduced to 320 active fighters, but when the French attacked a rebel convoy near Am Dagachi, the insurgents put up heavy resistance. Despite eventually winning the battle, the operation failed to destroy the First Liberation Army. Languedoc was the last major French operation of Tombalbaye's rule; the Chadian President consequently requested the French military to reduce its presence in the country. He also became increasingly critical of the Chadian Armed Forces' commanders and ordered the arrest of several officers, further worsening his relations with the military. In 1974, Mubi-speaking elements of the eastern rebels agreed to a peace deal with the government.

=== Political unrest and 1975 coup ===
By 1973 Tombalbaye's political strength was beginning to wane. In June he arrested Malloum and numerous PPT officials on charges of "political sorcery" for alleged involvement in animal sacrifices. In August he replaced the PPT with the National Movement for the Cultural and Social Revolution (known by its French acronym as MNRCS). He then engaged in a program of Authenticité to gain the support of Chad's urban elite, Africanising the names of people and places in the country. Fort-Lamy became known as N'Djamena. To regain the support of Sara conservatives in the south, he required all non-Muslim southern civil servants, ministers, and high ranking military officers to go through the traditional yondo initiation rites of a Sara subgroup. Between mid 1973 and April 1974 an estimated 3,000 persons went through the process, but the rites were seen as anti-Christian and further disaffected civil servants, military officers, and students with the regime. Drought also caused an economic downturn, and Tombalbaye sought to counter this by increasing cotton production. His efforts were partly successful in this regard, but generated antagonism when soldiers rounded up townspeople for "volunteer" labour. In March 1975 he had several senior army officers arrested for supposedly plotting against him. Several more arrests and a threat of a purge in early April moved military officers to take action. On April 13, 1975, several units of N'Djamena's gendarmerie under junior officers mutinied. Senior officers, joined by army commander General Noël Milarew Odingar, mounted an attack on the presidential palace, killing Tombalbaye. French forces in the capital did not intervene. A white paper published afterwards alleged that Tombalbaye intended to declare himself king and recruit a new army of fanatics which would destroy the rebellion against his rule. Many Chadians sympathised with the armed forces at the time of the coup, having been irked by the president's frequent mocking of their abilities and purges of their ranks.

On 15 April Malloum became chairman of the Supreme Military Council; the supreme body responsible for running the country. He became head of state a few months later. As a southerner with strong kinship ties to the north, Malloum believed that he could reconcile Chad's divided regions and establish representative institutions. He set a high priority on freeing Chad from French economic and political control, but in this effort he was unsuccessful. He sent French combat forces home, but he retained several hundred French advisers and renegotiated a series of military accords to ensure emergency aid. In his position he requested the removal of French military units from Chad, resulting in France abandoning the 172 Fort-Lamy Air Base at N'Djamena International Airport. By 1975 the only branches of the Chadian Armed Forces that continued to function were the Gendarmerie and the Army.

The end of Tombalbaye's regime caused Gaddafi to restart his support for the insurgents, as Malloum denounced the Libyan occupation of the Aouzou Strip and repudiated the 1972 deal. To improve his position, Malloum instead turned to the rebels. His government proved successful at convincing various traditional leaders and traditionalist opposition groups to lay down their weapons and reconcile with his leadership. Among others, Musa's FLT ended its insurgency. However, Malloum's attempts to end the war with FROLINAT proved less successful, partially due to the divisions among the movement's leadership. He made a deal with the First Liberation Army under Acyl, enlisting its aid against the Second Liberation Army.

=== Malloum's military government ===
With Libyan support, the FROLINAT rebels battled Malloum's regime. However, the rebels did not universally appreciate Gaddafi's influence; Hissène Habré strongly disagreed with the pro-Libyan stance of Oueddeï. Habré eventually split with the rest of FROLINAT over this issue, and began to wage a separate campaign against Malloum. In 1976, Gaddafi hinted at his intention of officially annexing the Aouzou Strip, while sending the Libyan military for forays into central Chad to assist allied rebels. By late 1976, most of the northern third of Chad was under combined Libyan-rebel control.

During the summer of 1977, FROLINAT rebels under the command of Goukouni Oueddeï and supported by Libya launched a military offensive from northern Chad. This offensive witnessed the first appearance of modern Soviet military equipment in the civil war. For the first time, aircraft were threatened by a strong air defense artillery: two aircraft of the Chadian air force were shot down in the Tibesti: a C-47 by a 14.5 mm and a Douglas DC-4 by a SA-7. President Malloum sought the help of France. The latter implemented a support operation that halted the rebels in southern Chad at the price of eighteen French military dead and the loss of two SEPECAT Jaguar 5 aircraft. Fearful of Gaddafi's influence in Chad, Egyptian President Anwar Sadat arranged to ship spare parts to Chad for the repair of its Soviet weapons.

On 25 August, 1978 the Supreme Military Council and Habré reached an understanding and signed the Fundamental Charter. The accord formally dissolved the council and replaced it with a provisional national unity government that was to run Chad until it could organise elections for a constituent assembly. Accordingly, Malloum appointed Habré as prime minister on 29 August, and he subsequently formed a government.

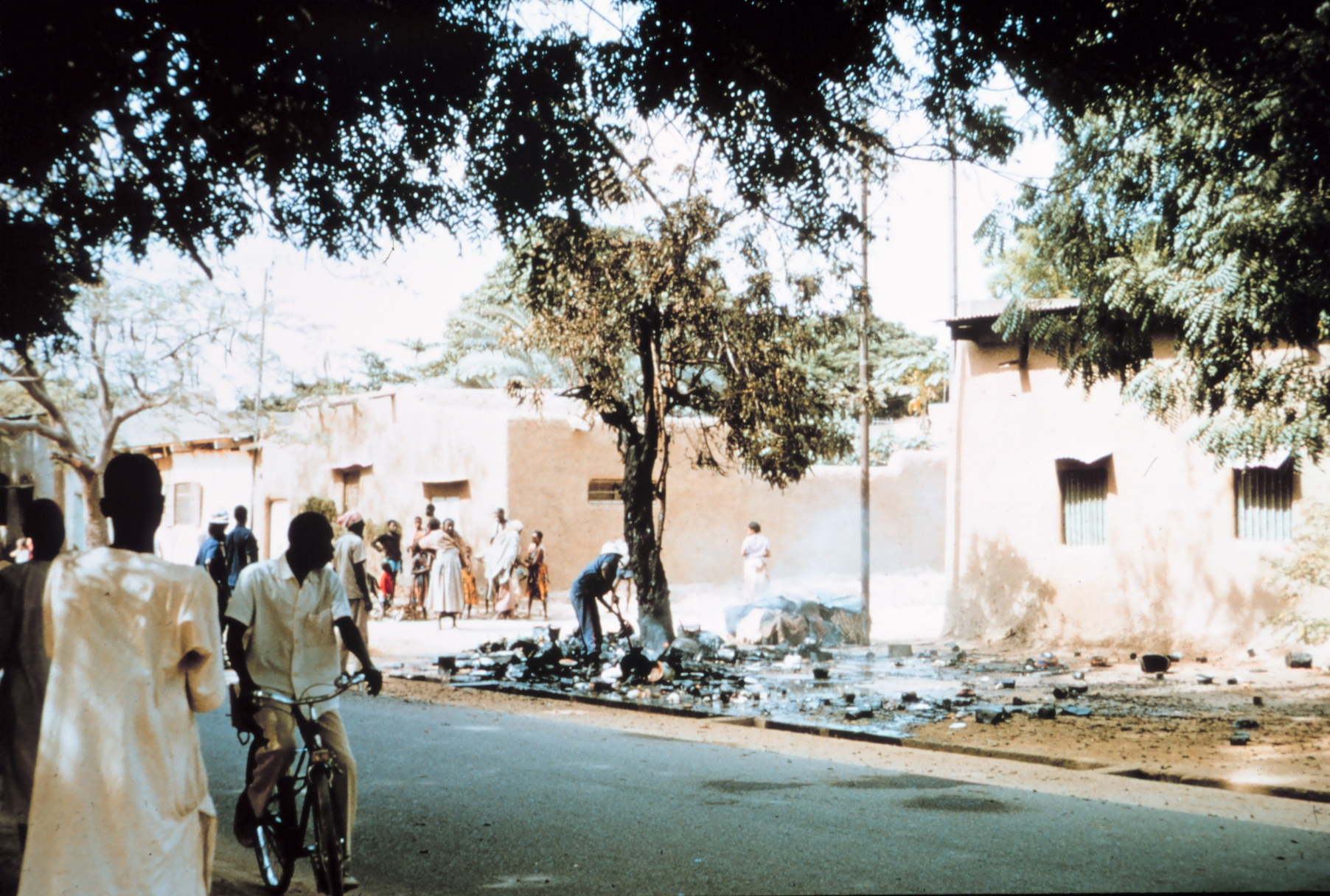
In 1979, N'Djamena (pictured in the 1960s) became the site of heavy fighting.

Tensions between Malloum and Habré climaxed in early February 1979 when the latter called for a general strike. In late February 1979, Habré ordered about 1,000 men to attack Malloum forces in N'Djamena. Equipped with mortars and machine guns, Habré's forces seized control of most of the city, while French troops occupied the European quarter. Sara people, fearful of losing their favorable political position, reportedly massacred thousands of Muslim civilians. Malloum fled to N'Djamena International Airport, which was under French protection, and two days later the belligerents reached a ceasefire. French troops policed the truce while Nigerian diplomats attempted to mediate a longer-lasting agreement. Governance broke down, and FROLINAT seized the opportunity by launching an offensive in the north.

=== Formation of the Transitional Government of National Unity ===
On 23 March 1979 Malloum resigned the presidency and went to Nigeria. Power was turned over to an eight-person provisional council headed by Oueddei, pending a permanent solution on government to be decided at a conference in the Nigerian city of Kano. A total of eleven various Chadian factions were represented when the meeting convened in August with an Organization of African Unity (OAU) committee. On 21 August the delegates signed the Lagos Accord, which outlined the establishment of a new Transitional Government of National Unity (known by its French acronym GUNT) to be sworn in in November. Oueddei became president, an office which was given a largely ceremonial role; Habré became Defence Minister; Colonel Wadel Abdelkader Kamougué became Vice President; and Acyl became Foreign Minister. In sum, the ministerial portfolios were balanced between the southerners (11) and the rest of the country (13) and among the favorite politicians of neighbouring states. GUNT was to rule until elections were held in the spring of 1982. In the meantime, an OAU peacekeeping mission consisting of troops from the Republic of Congo, Benin, and Guinea was to replace the French military presence.

== Aftermath ==
GUNT's members deeply distrusted one another and thus the government never fully consolidated. Factional militias were left armed, and by January 1980 Habré's forces were fighting another GUNT signatory group in Wadai.

== See also ==
- Chadian Civil War (disambiguation)
