= Ahmed Hassan Musa =

- Born: Chad
- Died: 1979; Ati
- Occupation: Insurgent
- Known for: Participated in the first phase of the Chadian Civil War

Ahmed Hassan Musa (died 1979) was a Chadian insurgent who participated to the first phase of the Chadian Civil War. An Islamic fundamentalist close to the Muslim Brotherhood, he was head of the General Union of the Children of Chad (Union Générale des Fils du Tchad or UGFT), an Islamic political party formed by Chadian exiles in Sudan. Because of the authoritarian and anti-Muslim policies of the President François Tombalbaye, he lived in exile in Sudan when the explosion of bloody riots in the Guéra Prefecture in 1965 opened him new chances. For this reason, he formed in his country of exile on September 7, 1965, the Liberation Front of Chad, the first insurgent group formed against Tombalbaye. A small group, at the Congress of Nyala Musa and his FLT united in 1966 with the Chadian National Union (UNT) of Ibrahim Abatcha to form the powerful National Liberation Front of Chad (FROLINAT). Musa soon resumed his autonomy and with his wing of the FLT operated on the Chad-Sudan border. When Tombalbaye fell in the 1975 coup, Musa readily came to terms with the new government. Four years later, in 1979, he was killed at Ati by Hissène Habré.
