= Centre for Studies and Training for Development =

Coordinates: 12°5′57.63″N 15°3′38.9″E

- Abbreviation: CEFOD
- Established: 1966; 60 years ago
- Purpose: Management training
- Location: B.P. 907 N'Djamena, Chad
- Region served: Chad
- Official language: French
- General Director: Antoine Bérilengar
- Training director: Yves P. Djofang
- Publications: Tchad et culture (monthly), Revue Juridique Tchadienne
- Parent organization: Jesuit Province of West Africa
- Affiliations: Jesuit, Catholic; Chad government (at start)
- Budget: US$1,000,000 annually
- Staff: 43
- Website: jesuitespao.com/nos-oeuvres/lapostolat-social/le-cefod/ (in French)

The Centre for Studies and Training for Development (French: Centre d'études et de formation pour le Développement; CEFOD) is a centre established by the Jesuits in Chad in 1966 near the beginning of independence at the request of the Head of State François Tombalbaye, to offer training to Chadian professionals in the economic and social field.

== Departments ==
CEFOD is organized into four departments:

- Department of Documentation & Legal Information
- Publishing & Media Department.
- Training Department
- Administrative Department

== Recognition ==
CEFOD has received international recognition.

== See also ==
- List of Jesuit sites
