= Mohamed Baghlani =

Chadian rebel

- محمد البغلاني
- Died: March 1977

Mohamed Baghlani (died 1977) was a Chadian insurgent leader during the First Chadian Civil War.

== Formation of FROLINAT ==
Baghlani was the most prominent Arab member of the Chadian National Union (UNT), an Islamic political party founded in 1958 and officially banned by the government of Chad in 1962. It survived as an underground movement. UNT decided to overthrow Chad's President François Tombalbaye and form in 1966 a rebel insurgent group, the FROLINAT. Baghlani played a prominent part in the Congress of Nyala in which the FROLINAT was formed.

== Expulsion from FROLINAT and formation of Volcan Army ==
When the FROLINAT's first leader was killed in 1968, a vicious succession fight erupted for the control of the organization. Abba Siddick emerged victorious in 1970. Siddick, who was perceived to be anti-Arab, expelled al-Baghlani from the FROLINAT in June.

Other sources indicate that another reason for the breakup was the opposition to Siddick's foreign policy, who strengthened his ties with communist countries such as North Korea or the USSR, which al-Baghlani opposed.

Al-Baghlani responded by creating a new rebel group, the Volcan Army, composed of Arab insurgents who refused to accept the leadership of Siddick. Volcan Army was based in Libya and had an Islamist tendency. For a long time it did not represent a real force on the ground.

As leader of the Volcan Army, al-Baghlani maintained close relations with Libya, but refused any dealings with communist and atheist states.

== Death ==
The Volcan Army started emerging as a significant group in 1975. The following year Ahmat Acyl entered in the organization, and in January 1977 with the support of Libya attacked Baghlani's leadership. Shortly after, on March 27, Baghlani died with his chauffeur Mahamat Hissein in what might have been a planned car accident in Libya's Benghazi.
