= Aboubakar Abdel Rahmane =

- Died: 1979
- Allegiance: Chad
- Branch: People's Armed Forces; FROLINAT; MPLT

Aboubakar Abdel Rahmane (died 1979) was a Chadian warlord active during the civil war. His early life is very undocumented, and his date of birth is unknown. A semi-literate Muslim Kanembu, he originally belonged to Goukouni Oueddei's People's Armed Forces (FAP). A member of the FAP's Comité Militaire Interarmées Provisoire (CMIAP), he was expelled in 1977 from the organization for having protested against the neglect of his area, Kanem. Aboubakar formed the Third Liberation Army of the FROLINAT, later called Popular Movement for the Liberation of Chad (MPLT) in January 1978. It was a small militia composed mostly of Kanembu and active around Lake Chad. It early became Nigeria's chief agent in the country, and also for this Aboubakar as head of the MPLT was one of the four Chadian leaders invited at the Kano peace conference in Nigeria in March 1979. Aboubakar played here an important role, being the only Chadian leader to advocate the withdrawal of French troops from Chad, a key aspect of the following Kano Accord, as the proclaimed necessity of an "African solution" (i.e. Nigerian). A government of national unity was created, and Aboubakar became Interior Minister. A month later, through Nigerian help he even obtained an associate of his, Lol Mahamat Choua, to be made president of the Transitional Government of National Unity (GUNT). Some time after this Aboubakar died, and the importance of the MPLT waned, also through the new Lagos Accord.
