= Acyl Ahmat Akhabach =

Chadian soldier and politician (1944–1982)

Minister of Foreign Affairs
- In office 1979–1982
- President: Goukouni Oueddei
- Preceded by: Dabar Nag Koumaba Dering
- Succeeded by: Idriss Miskine

Head of the Democratic Revolutionary Council
- Succeeded by: Acheikh ibn Oumar

Personal details
- Born: 1944 French Equatorial Africa (present-day Chad)
- Died: July 19, 1982 Laï, Chad
- Resting place: Moundou, Chad
- Occupation: Insurgent leader, politician

Acyl Ahmat Akhabach (1944–1982) was a Chadian Arab rebel leader during the First Chadian Civil War. He was the head of the Democratic Revolutionary Council until his death in 1982, and served as the foreign minister of Chad under Goukouni Oueddei's government.

== Volcan Army ==
Under the Tombalbaye government, Acyl had been a National Assembly deputy from Batha. In 1976 he joined the small Arab-dominated Volcan Army. With the support of Libya's president Muammar Gaddafi, he opposed the group's leader, Mohamed Baghlani, and when the latter died in a traffic accident in Tripoli in 1977, promptly became the new leader of the militia. From that moment, he was known as Gaddafi's man in Chad.

Acyl rapidly strengthened his militia, which became famous for the quality of its fighters and garnered increasing support among the Baggara element in the country. Libya's support was also important to Acyl's group, which from 1978 became bigger and steadier than the other insurgent factions. In the same year, Acyl supported Libya's goal to reunite the FROLINAT's main factions, that resulted in the congress of Faya in which Goukouni Oueddei, leader of the People's Armed Forces (FAP), became the new secretary-general of the FROLINAT. The accord didn't last long. Gaddafi instigated Acyl to attack Oueddei's FAP in Faya on August 27, 1978 in an attempt to wrest control of FROLINAT from him, but Acyl was defeated. Acyl, the FROLINAT's then adjutant chief of staff in charge of the direction and administration of the military, promptly left Faya for Tripoli under the protection of Libyan troops.

== Commander of the CDR ==
Acyl's faction, renamed Democratic Revolutionary Council (CDR) at the beginning of 1979, did not participate in the battle of N'Djamena that erupted in February 1979 and caused the fall of the government in Chad. For this he was overlooked at the first international peace conference held in March in Kano, in Nigeria, where the main militias agreed to create a government of national unity, which excluded all pro-Libyan factions.

As a reaction Acyl and other insurgent leaders such as Abba Siddick, Adoum Dana and Mohamat Said, threatened to create a counter-government; this cowed Nigeria into organizing a second peace conference in Kano, in April, where all main rebel leaders were present, including Acyl. At the conference Goukouni and Hissène Habré attacked Acyl and other faction leaders, accusing them of having no real military strength on the ground. The participants of the conference were unable to reach any agreement on forming the cabinet, and a few weeks later Habré and Goukouni unilaterally agreed with the N'Djamena Accord to exclude Acyl and his allies from the new Transitional Government of National Unity (GUNT). In their view, Acyl was just "a Libyan provocateur".

The increasingly chaotic situation in Chad brought Nigeria to convene in May a third reconciliation conference, this time in Lagos, to which all factions were invited. In response, Acyl and others arrived, but discovered that the factions that formed the GUNT had boycotted the meeting, causing the failure of the conference. Acyl, with Said and Siddick, on June 2 created in northern Chad with Libyan military support a new political project under Acyl's leadership, the Front for Joint Provisional Action (FACP).

Amid rumors that Libya and Nigeria might recognize the FACP as Chad's legitimate government, the GUNT was given five weeks by the international community to include the other factions in the government. At the end, the GUNT submitted, and its factions participated in a second peace conference in Lagos, open to all parties. The result of the summit was the Lagos Accord, signed on August 21, under which a national unity government was to be formed. The new cabinet was sworn into office on November 10, with Goukouni Oueddei as chairman and Acyl as foreign minister.

On March 20, 1980, Defense Minister Habré with Egyptian and Sudanese support rallied his militia, the Armed Forces of the North, in an attempt to overthrow Goukouni, leading to the second battle of N'Djamena, which pitched Habré's men against factions led by Goukouni, Acyl and the vice-president, Wadel Abdelkader Kamougué. To defeat his rival Goukouni, probably persuaded by Acyl, on June 15 signed a defense pact with Libya; as a result 7,000 Libyan troops and 7,000 members of the Libyan-raised Islamic Legion were in Chad by the end of 1980, and helped expel Habré from N'Djamena on December 16, after a week of harsh fighting.

This was followed on January 6, 1981, by a joint communiqué issued by Goukouni and Gaddafi, that stated that Chad and Libya had agreed to "work for the realization of complete unity between the two countries". The comuniqué, while strongly supported by Acyl and his faction, had a negative international response, and was also unpopular in Chad; Goukouni was now seen as a Libyan puppet. Relations between Goukouni and Gaddafi became strained, possibly because of rumors that Gaddafi was instigating a coup d'état against Goukouni, to replace him with Acyl. Goukouni's suspicions of plans to replace him with Acyl had been fueled previously by the assassination by Libyans of two senior FROLINAT officials, and the clashes between the First Army and Acyl's CDR.

Consequently, when, on October 22, French president François Mitterrand proposed to send an Organisation of African Unity peace contingent into Chad to replace the Libyans. Goukouni and the GUNT asked the Libyans to immediately leave Chad, but not without debate: four ministers, among them Acyl, had voted against the decision. Gaddafi rapidly complied, and the OAU troops arrived; but these proved ineffectual.

Taking advantage of the Libyans' departure, Habré in 1982 attacked the GUNT, advancing across central Chad from his bases in Darfur, and occupied N'Djamena with hardly any opposition on June 7, forcing the GUNT to flee. A month later, on July 19, Acyl died in the southwestern town of Laï when he inadvertently stepped backwards into the spinning propellers of his Cessna airplane, a gift from Gaddafi. He was buried in Moundou, in front of the lycée Adoum Dallah.

He was succeeded as leader of the CDR militia by the former Defense Minister Acheikh ibn Oumar.
