= Western Forces =

Western Forces could refer to

- Western Armed Forces
- Allies of World War II
- one side of the conflict in Civil War (film)
