= Matibeye Géneviève =

Chadian singer (born 1987)

- Born: Matibeye Géneviève; 2 September 1987 (age 38); Doba, Chad
- Origin: N'Djamena, Chad
- Genres: World music
- Occupation: Singer
- Instrument: Vocals
- Years active: 2012–present

Matibeye Géneviève (born 2 September 1987) is a Chadian singer. She represented her country at the 2017 Jeux de la Francophonie in Abidjan, Ivory Coast.

== Career ==
Matibeye Géneviève was born on 2 September 1987 in Doba, southern Chad and is known to her friends as "Genzy". Her father moved to Cameroon for work and the family followed him there, Géneviève spent her early childhood in that country before her father and the family returned to Chad. Her mother is also a keen singer. The family is very religious and at the age of 12 Géneviève joined her protestant church's junior choir. Within a few years she had graduated to the church's senior choir. Géneviève has a license to work as a laboratory technician but found work singing in the cabarets of N'Djamena where she became known as the Rossignol (nightingale).

Géneviève launched her solo singing career in 2012 and has released several singles in French, Arabic and Ngambay. She is planning to release an album in the near future. Géneviève has sung with fellow Chadian Mounira Mitchala. Géneviève won the world music prizes at the 2015 Darri Awards and at the 2015 NdjamVi Festival. She performed at the 2016 International Women's Day at the Institut Français. Géneviève represented Chad in the singing category at the 2017 Jeux de la Francophonie in Abidjan, Ivory Coast.
