= List of ambassadors of Chad to the United States =

Coordinates: 38°54′51.4″N 77°03′10.5″W

Ambassador of Chad to United States Embassy of Chad in Washington, D.C.
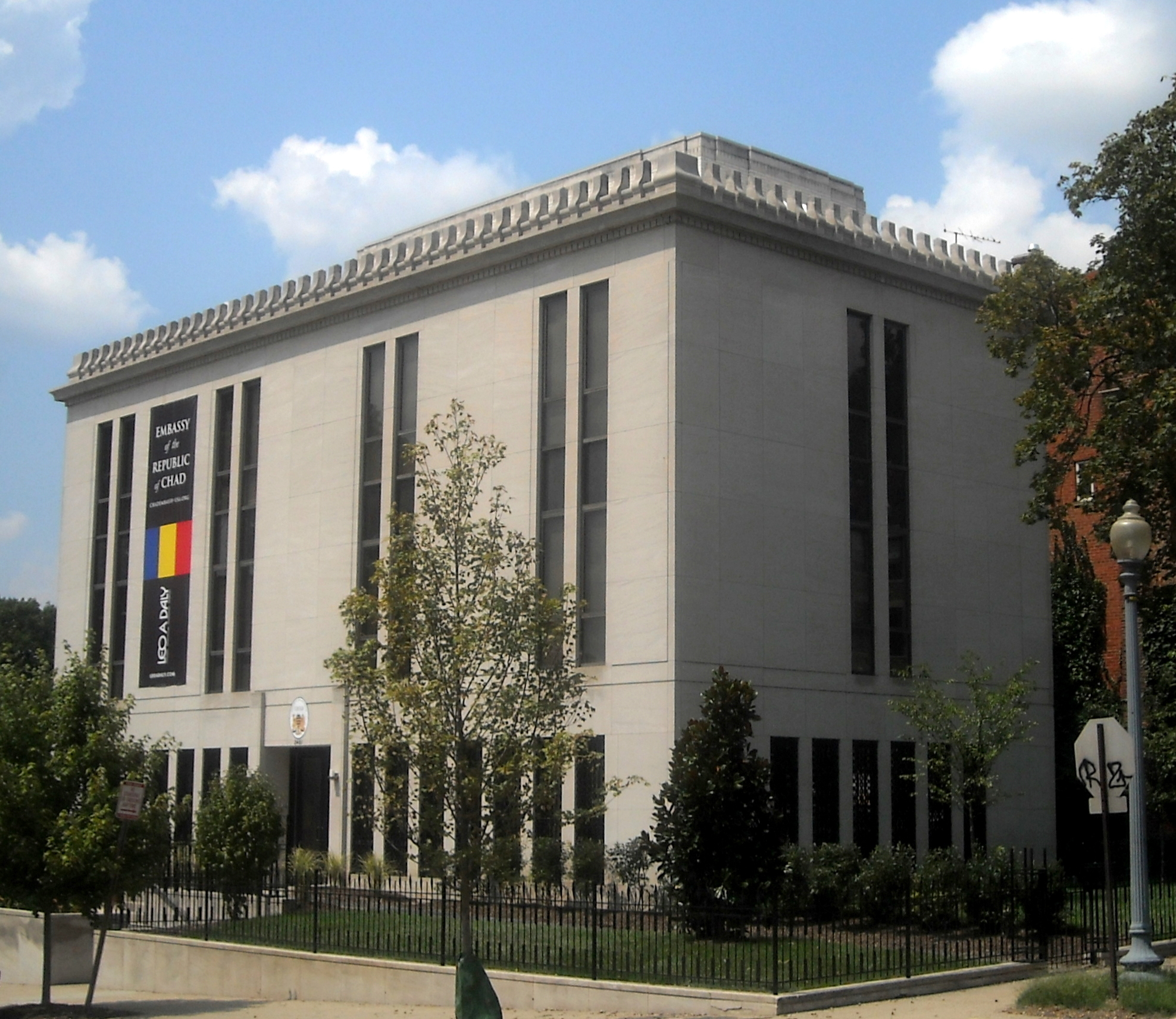
- Incumbent; Hassane Mahamat Nasser since May 21, 2014
- Inaugural holder: Adam Malick Sow
- Formation: May 25, 1961

The Chadian ambassador in Washington, D. C. is the official representative of the Government in N'Djamena to the Government of the United States.

== List of representatives ==
| Diplomatic agrément | Diplomatic accreditation | Ambassador | Observations | List of heads of state of Chad | List of presidents of the United States | Term end |
|---|---|---|---|---|---|---|
| June 27, 1961 | | | EMBASSY OPENED | François Tombalbaye | John F. Kennedy | |
| May 25, 1961 | | Adam Malick Sow | | François Tombalbaye | John F. Kennedy | |
| May 1, 1964 | May 25, 1964 | Boukar Abdoul | | François Tombalbaye | Lyndon B. Johnson | |
| September 18, 1968 | September 26, 1968 | Lazare Massibe | | François Tombalbaye | Lyndon B. Johnson | |
| February 21, 1974 | | Abdelkerim Mahamat | Born in 1933 in Goz-Beida; Chargé d'affaires, Ambassador of Chad to the Kingdom of Libya (1966–1968); deputy treasurer general of the PPT-RDA; Minister of Livestock, Water & Forests and Fisheries. | François Tombalbaye | Gerald Ford | |
| April 15, 1974 | June 5, 1974 | Jean Alingué Bawoyeu | | François Tombalbaye | Gerald Ford | |
| December 14, 1976 | | Abdoul Ousman | Chargé d'affaires | Félix Malloum | Gerald Ford | |
| April 13, 1977 | May 13, 1977 | Jules Pierre Toura Gaba | (Maibiyan 28 XII 1920–) 1975–1978 he was Foreign minister, 1974 he was Ambassador in Bonn, Rome and Bern | Félix Malloum | Jimmy Carter | |
| November 15, 1983 | November 21, 1983 | Mahamat Ali Adoum | | Hissène Habré | Ronald Reagan | |
| February 1992 | | Abdoulaye Lamana | Nomination withdrawn, ambassador to Belgium | Idriss Déby | George H. W. Bush | |
| March 26, 1992 | April 2, 1992 | Acheikh Ibn-Oumar | | Idriss Déby | George H. W. Bush | |
| May 19, 1993 | September 3, 1993 | Laoumaye Mekonyo Koumbairia | (* 1945 in Bao, Chad) Diploma, National School Administration, N'Djamena. Degree in diplomatic studies, Institute International Relations, Cameroon. Master's degree, Institute International Relations, Paris. Doctor of Laws, Faculty Law and Judicial Studies, Paris. Career 1st secretary Chadian Embassies, Paris and Kinshasa, Zaire, 1967–1974. Various positions including chief of staff to Minister Foreign Affairs Foreign Ministry, head Europe-American section Directorate Political Affairs and International Organizations, head Directorate Political Affairs and International Organizations, director of protocol, 1989, 90. Then international affairs advisor to President of Chad. Minister for civil service and labour and for national education, 1990–1993. Ambassador to the United States Washington, since 1993. | Idriss Déby | Bill Clinton | |
| January 24, 1995 | March 20, 1995 | Mahamat Saleh Ahmat | | Idriss Déby | Bill Clinton | |
| December 21, 1998 | January 21, 1999 | Ahmat Hassaballah Soubiane | | Idriss Déby | Bill Clinton | |
| November 23, 2004 | December 9, 2004 | Mahamoud Adam Béchir | | Idriss Déby | George W. Bush | |
| July 12, 2012 | July 30, 2012 | Maitine Djoumbe | | Idriss Déby | Barack Obama | |
| March 18, 2014 | May 21, 2014 | Hassane Mahamat Nasser | | Idriss Déby | Barack Obama | |
