= 1975 Chadian coup d'état =

Military overthrow of President François Tombalbaye

- Part of the Chadian Civil War (1965–1979)
Date	13–15 April 1975
Location	Chad
Result	Coup leader seized power; President N'Garta Tombalbaye killed and replaced by Noël Milarew Odingar as interim Head of State under a Supreme Military Council; Previously purged Officers reinstated

Belligerents
Government of Chad: Compagnies Tchadiennes de Securité (CTS)	(Chad) Supreme Military Council (CSM): Chadian Armed Forces (FAT)

Commanders and leaders
N'Garta Tombalbaye † (President of Chad); Col. Selebiani (Head of the CTS)	(Chad) Noël Milarew Odingar (Major, leader of the CSM and FAT) (Chad) Lt. Dimtolaum (Lieutenant and the commander of local army units) (Chad) Wadel Abdelkader Kamougué (Officer and a key leader of the coup)

Strength
Unknown	Unknown

On 13 April 1975, a military coup d'état deposed and killed Chadian president François Tombalbaye, replacing him by a military council.

The most important factor leading up to the coup was a growing sentiment of distrust towards Tombalbaye inside the Chadian army. This distrust was exacerbated by the president's planned purge of the military cadre. It was also linked to the army's incapacity to deal with the ongoing rebellion waged by the FROLINAT, FAN and related insurgent groups.

There are strong indications of French involvement in (or at least tacit acceptance and foreknowledge of) the coup, despite French support to Tombalbaye's regime throughout the years.

== Background ==
In the years leading up to the coup, Tombalbaye's regime had acted more and more erratically. He had alienated important sections of his own southern support base through an enforced "cultural revolution" that had rendered the Sara initiation ritual of yondo obligatory for civil servants.

Chad's former colonial power, France, had urged Tombalbaye to involve the military leadership in power, and the President did reserve a place in his party, the Chadian Progressive Party (PPT), for the army commander; but much more important and decisive in undermining his support among the military was, in 1973, to be the arrest of the Army Chief of Staff, General Félix Malloum, for an alleged coup plot (the so-called Black Sheep Plot). Also the Generals Jacques Doumro and Negue Djogo, and other officers, were arrested between 1971 and 1975 on similar charges, the latter on March 23, 1975.

It was in this atmosphere of tension that Tombalbaye proceeded to yet another purge in the army, hitting this time the gendarmerie, the 1,200-strong military police; its head, Colonel Djimet, and his aide, Major Alphonse Kotiga, were both arrested on April 2, 1975, for the escape of some FROLINAT prisoners. This was to prove a fatal error.

== Army mutiny ==
The coup started before sunrise on April 13 when in Boraho, a locality 35 miles (56 km) from the capital, army units led by Lieutenant Dimtolaum left their base and moved towards N'Djamena, where they converged on the president's white-walled palace on the edge of the city. At 5:00 a furious and bloody battle started with Tombalbaye's presidential guard, the Compagnies Tchadiennes de Securité (CTS). Decisive in deciding the outcome of the battle was the arrival of the interim commander of the FAT, Noël Milarew Odingar, who brought reinforcements and assumed command of the insurgents.

Other sources name Colonel (later General) Wadel Abdelkader Kamougué as the leader of the coup.

At 8:30 Colonel Selebiani, head of the CTS, issued an appeal on the radio for his men to surrender; this put an end to all fighting. In the battle Tombalbaye had been fatally wounded, and died shortly after. When the news of Tombalbaye's death was given, there were mass celebrations in the capital, with thousands of Chadians pouring in the streets while dancing and joyfully chanting "Tombalbaye is dead".

== Consequences ==
Already at 6:30 Odingar announced on the public radio that the armed forces had "exercised their responsibilities before God and the nation". In a later communique the coupists were to justify their actions, accusing Tombalbaye of having governed by dividing the tribes, and of having humiliated the army and treated it with contempt.

General Odingar acted provisionally as head of state and the jailed officers were immediately freed. Among these was General Félix Malloum, who was chosen to be chairman of a nine-man military junta, named the Supreme Military Council (Conseil Supérieur Militaire or CSM), that took office on April 15. It immediately arrested eight of Tombalbaye's top aides and suspended the 1962 constitution, while all parties were banned and the National Assembly was dissolved.

The success of the coup did not produce a major break with Tombalbaye's policies. This was not surprising because, like Tombalbaye, both Odingar and Malloum were Sara from the south of Chad. While the CSM did make some moves to conciliate the north of the country, the Muslims continued to feel themselves second-class citizens and the FROLINAT rebellion continued.

== French involvement ==
On the day of the coup, the French Ministry of Defense sent a telegram explicitly prohibiting the French army contingents in Chad from taking any military action in response to the coup.

Subsequent research has pointed to strong indications that French authorities were either complicit in the coup or at least had a degree of foreknowledge. Even though France had propped up Tombalbaye's regime through various means, including a military intervention from 1969 to 1972, the coup was preceded by aggravating Franco-Chadian tensions, as well as disagreements over the handling of the Claustre hostage crisis.

A first indicator is that Chadian units - which probably included French military advisors - had started approaching the capital two days prior to the coup. Secondly, the feared French security agent Camille Gourvennec, who served as de facto head of Tombalbaye's secret police service and was responsible for rounding up dissidents, was maintained in his post by the new military regime. This would have been unlikely without his complicity, although Gourvennec denied all foreknowledge. Thirdly, a week after the coup, colonel Kamougué himself bragged about the involvement of unspecified French forces.

== See also ==
- 2006 Chadian coup d'état attempt
