= Salma Khalil Alio =

Chadian writer and artist

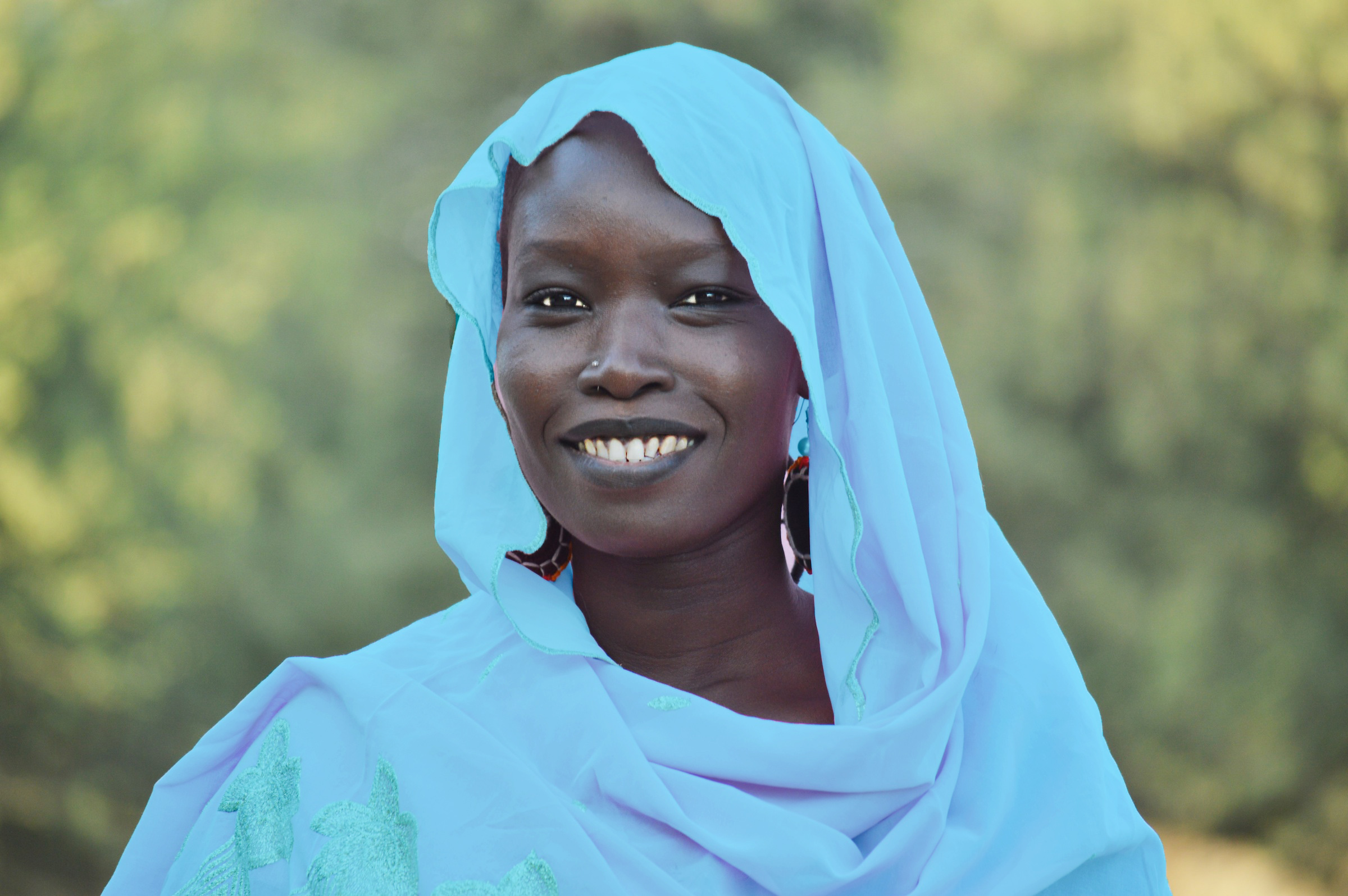
- Born: 22 January 1982 (age 44); N'Djamena, Chad
- Occupations: Poet; cartoonist; artist; graphic designer; Photographer; Writer
- Notable work: Alio is the founder of the Positive – an association which seeks to support Chadian women artists in any medium.
- Awards: In 2016, the jury of the Joseph Brahim Seid Literary Award awarded her a special prize.

Salma Khalil Alio (born 22 January 1982) is a Chadian poet and writer, photographer, caricaturist and graphic artist.

== Biography ==
Alio was born on 22 January 1982 in N'Djamena. At the age of two, she was forced to flee from Chad as her father, the former leader of the National Liberation Front Chad Khalil Alio, was persecuted by the government of Hissène Habré. As a result, Alio grew up in Marburg, Germany, whilst her father studied for his doctorate. The family then moved to Maiduguri, Nigeria, where she passed her Alliance Française exams in 1999. During her secondary education, Alio developed her interest in graphic art and studied with Gérard Leclaire. In 1999 she returned to Chad for the first time and began to study science in Farcha. Her sister is the singer Mounira Mitchala.

== Career ==
Alio is the founder of the Positive – an association which seeks to support Chadian women artists in any medium. The goal is to promote handicrafts and art as a way for women to earn income and independence. She works across many different artistic mediums, which include:

=== Creative writing ===
==== Poetry ====
The first volume of poems Passion de la pensée was published in Paris in 2004 by The Manuscript.

==== Short stories ====
In 2013, she collaborated on the publication of Aux vents des aléas de la vie ("On the winds of the hazards of life"), a collection of stories about such problems as expropriation, polygamy and homosexuality in Chad. In 2014, her stories were included in the book Couleurs de l'Existence, a collection of stories by six Chadian writers. In this publication, Salma wrote the short story Périple sur la reine du Guéra (Journey of Queen Guera), which is the story of two poachers on a mountain in the Guera region, guarded by the spirit of Margaï.

==== Awards ====
In 2016, the jury of the Joseph Brahim Seid Literary Award awarded her a special prize.

=== Graphic design ===
Alio worked as a graphic designer at Tigo Tchad from 2008 to 2017. As a graphic artist, several times a month, Alio publishes on the association's Facebook page episodes of her own comic book Débarquement à N'Djamena about the adventures of three young foreigners who live in Chad. She is the first woman in Chad to work as a cartoonist.

=== Photography ===
Alio started the project 'Portraits of Chadian Women' to encourage a sense of pride in the accomplishments of women in the country. The exhibition ha been displayed in a variety of locations around the country and abroad, including Paris as part of the Chadian National Development Plan (PND). She represented Chad at the 8th Francophone Games, which not only have categories for sports, but also culture. Alio represented Chad in Photography. In 2016, she was the artistic director of a project implemented jointly with the French Institute in N'Djamena, in which children from Baga-Sol, Abeche, Moundou and N'Djamena received cameras to take pictures that show the role of girls in society.
