= Ahmat Hassaballah Soubiane =

Chadian politician and diplomat

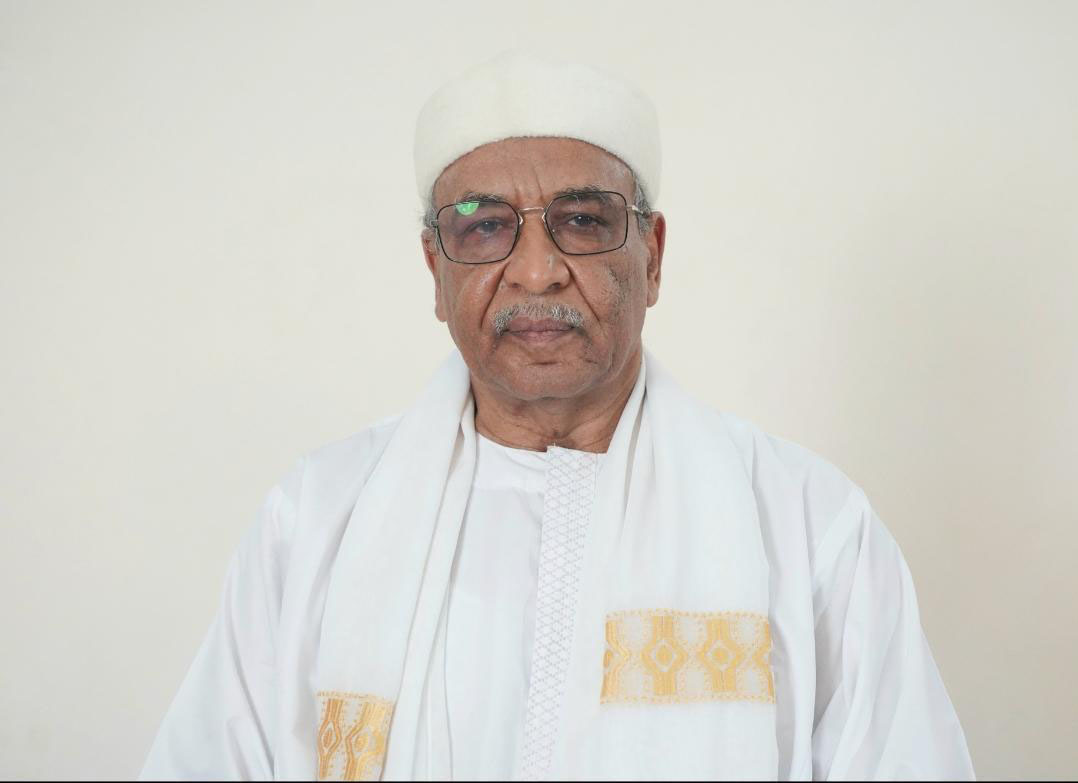
Image of Ahmat Soubiane

Ahmat Hassaballah Soubiane is a Chadian politician and diplomat. He was the Ambassador of Chad to the United States from 1999 to 2004.

Soubiane was appointed as Ambassador to the United States on 21 December 1998 and presented his credentials on 21 January 1999.

The Criminal Court decided in August 2008 that Soubiane had breached the constitution and the territorial integrity and security of Chad, sentencing him to death and ordering the confiscation of his property.

Following a peace agreement signed in Tripoli, Libya on 25 July 2009, Soubiane, as the leader of a group opposed to President Idriss Deby, visited Tripoli on 6 August 2009 to meet Libyan leader Muammar al-Gaddafi and thank him for his work facilitating peace in Chad. He also expressed his group's commitment to the peace agreement.
