= Mariam Brahim =

Chadian physician (born 1956)

- Born: 16 June 1956 (age 70); Abéché, Chad
- Citizenship: Chadian
- Education: Leningrad Medical School (MD, 1983); * Russian Academy of Sciences, Moscow (PhD, 1997)
- Occupations: Physician, professor, pediatrician
- Years active: 1983–present
- Employer: University of N'Djamena
- Known for: Public health programs for children's health
- Title: Professor of Pediatrics
- Children: 5

Mariam Brahim is a Chadian physician. She worked as a professor and pediatrician at the University of N'Djamena. Educated in the Soviet Union, she graduated from a medical school in Leningrad in 1983 and earned her doctorate from the Russian Academy of Sciences in Moscow in 1997. Along with physician Grace Kodindo, Brahim coordinated and supervised public health programs for children's health in Chad from 1997 to 2006.

== Early life and education ==
Mariam Brahim was born on 16 June 1956 in Abéché, Chad to Fatimé Fadoul and Brahim Djadarab. She attended primary school in Abéché alongside her four siblings and finished her secondary education at Lycée Franco-Arabe. She learned English and travelled to N'Djamena for final classes in preparation for her baccalaureate examinations. Despite having French teachers that occasionally mocked her and claimed that "women could not master geometry", she passed the examination in 1976.

Mariam considered pursuing architecture at the University of N'Djamena, but at the suggestion of her cousin, she applied for funding to study in the Soviet Union and received a grant to study medicine. In the Soviet Union she studied the Russian language in Rostov-on-Don. She enrolled in a Leningrad medical school renowned for its pediatrics program and graduated in 1983.

== Career ==
After marrying in 1983 in Moscow, Brahim and her husband decided not to return to Chad, where Hissène Habré had seized power. Her husband took a job in Brazzaville in the Republic of the Congo. She found employment as a physician in Brazzaville, holding the position from 1986 to 1989. She returned to N'Djamena in 1989 to care for her family. After Idriss Déby rose to power in Chad, the government appointed Brahim's husband as ambassador to Russia in 1991. Brahim continued her education at Moscow's Russian Academy of Sciences and wrote a thesis under a woman medical professor, receiving a doctorate in 1996.

Brahim returned to Chad in 1997, working at the University of N'Djamena as a professor and pediatrician. She regarded public health programs as important and worked with fellow Chadian pediatrician Grace Kodindo from 1997 to 2006. Brahim coordinated and supervised public health programs, including a country-wide program promoting popular education for children's health in 1999.

Brahim was interviewed by anthropologist Marie-José Tubiana. She told Tubiana that her work kept her so busy that she only discovered she was a delegate to a constitutional convention in the early 1990s through a radio announcement.

== Personal life ==
Brahim married in 1983 in Moscow. She had five children, three of whom were born in the Soviet Union and the other two in the Republic of Congo and Chad.
