= Mounira Mitchala =

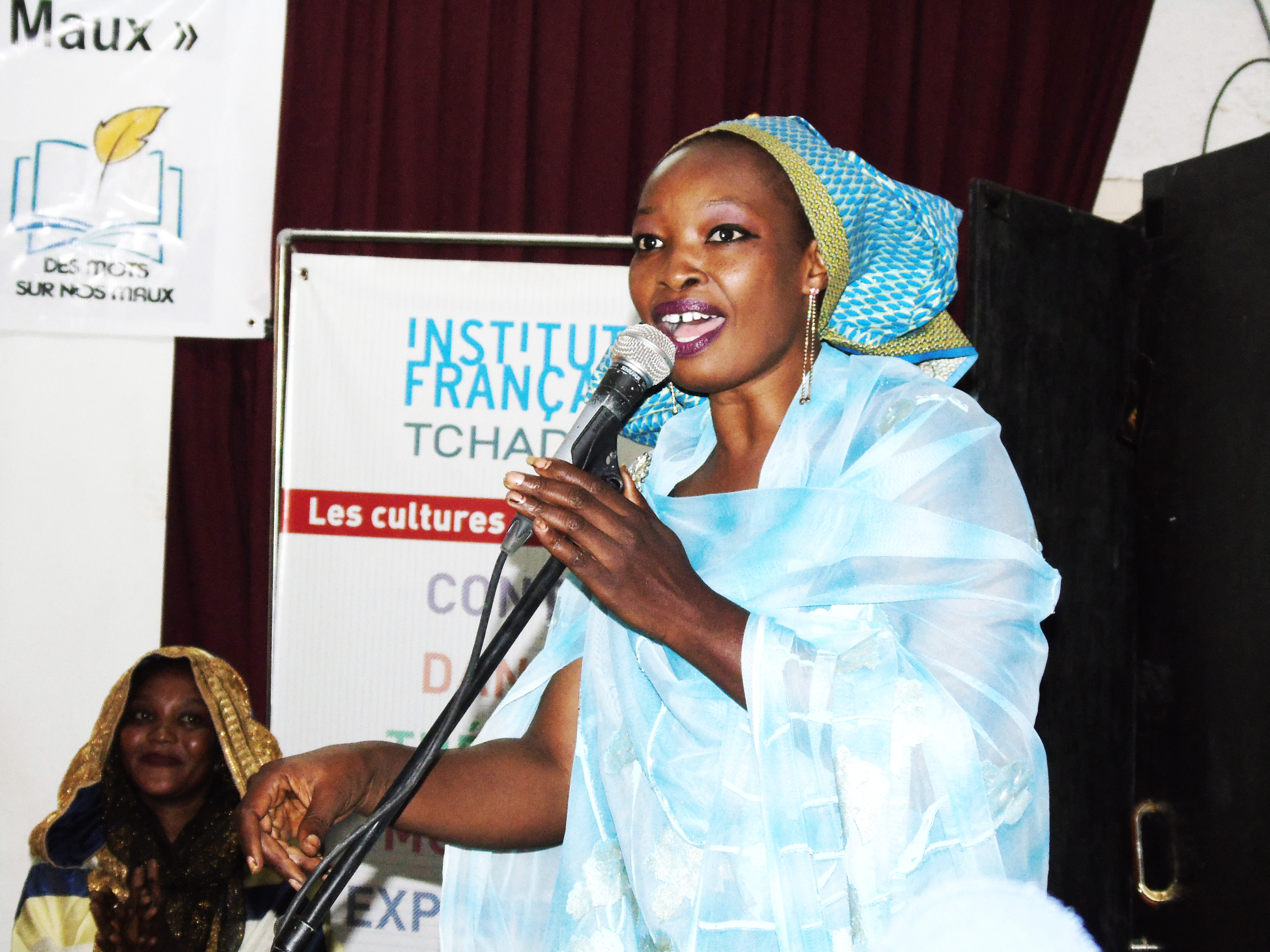
- Mitchala at the literary competition "Des mots sur nos maux"

Background information
- Also known as: Sweet Panther
- Born: Mounira Khalil; 1979 (age 45–46); Chad
- Occupations: Singer, author, composer, actress

Mounira Mitchala (Arabic: منيرة ميتشالا), also known as Sweet Panther, is a Chadian singer, author, performer, composer and actress.

== Biography ==
She was born in 1979 and her real name is Mounira Khalil. Mounira Mitchala's father was Dr. Khalil Alio, a one time rector of the University of Chad. Her sister is Chad's first female cartoonist, Salma Khalil Alio.

== Career ==
Mitchala was born in 1979 in Chad. In the early stages of her career, Mitchala made minor scene appearances in several Chadian films such as Daratt and Abouna by Mahamat Saleh Haroun. She is known nationally and internationally for her song "Talou Lena" from the album of the same name. Mitchala also sings with traditional rhythms drawn from the confluence of North and Central African music culture respectively that makes Mitchala’s music a unique blend. She uses this platform to address problems in Africa particularly related to her home country Chad. Through her words, she denounces forced marriage, campaigns against the advance of the desert and the genocide of Darfur. She also advocates for an end to the civil war engulfing her country Chad, discrimination against AIDS patients and excision. Mitchala has made several remarkable stage appearances alongside Tiken Jah Fakoly and Ismaël Lô.
