= Joseph Brahim Seid =

Chadian writer and politician

Joseph Brahim Seid (1927 in N'Djamena – 1980) was a Chadian writer and politician. He served as Minister of Justice from 1966 to 1975. As a writer he is known for the works Au Tchad sous les étoiles ("In Chad under the stars", 1962) and Un enfant du Tchad ("A Child of Chad", 1967), based on his own life.

== See also ==
- List of Chadians
- List of African writers
