= Mahamoud Adam Béchir =

Chadian diplomat

- Born: 1965 (age 60–61); Biltine, Chad
- Education: Bachelor of Science in Pharmacy
- Spouse: Nouracham Bechir Niam

Mahamoud Adam Béchir (born 1965) is a Chadian diplomat. Previously he was Chadian Ambassador to the United States from 2004 to 2012. Currently Béchir serves as ambassador of Chad to the Russian Federation.

== Biography ==
Born in Biltine in 1965, Béchir was educated internationally. After obtaining a Bachelor of Science in pharmacy at the University of Khartoum, Bechir returned to Chad and appointed chef at Chad's Military Hospital HMI. he continued his education at the Naval Postgraduate School in Monterey, California, and its Center for Civil-Military Relations, graduating in 1997 with a master's degree. Bechir was promoted as lieutenant colonel and transferred from HMI to the Defence Ministry as Director of Military Corporation. He also attended England's Cranfield University.

In 2004 Bechir was appointed by President Idriss Déby as ambassador to the United States, Canada, Brazil, Argentina and Cuba.

In 2005, he visited West Virginia University.

With the easing of tensions between Chad and Sudan, President Déby sent his Minister of Foreign Affairs, Moussa Faki, accompanied by Mahamoud Adam Bachir (who knows many members of the Sudanese regime, from the university in Khartoum) and army officers, to Khartoum on December 24, 2010. The delegation met with Sudanese president Omar al-Bashir and gave him a personal message from his counterpart.

Ambassador Bechir and President Déby inaugurated a new Chadian embassy in Washington, D.C., and a new embassy in Pretoria.

After eight years as ambassador to the United States, Bechir was instead appointed as Chad's first ambassador to South Africa, based in Pretoria, in 2012.

Bechir was appointed ambassador to Russia in 2020 by president Idriss Déby.

In 2021, he was indicted in the United States for bribery amounting to $2,000,000.
