= Grace Kodindo =

Chadian obstetrician-gynecologist

- Born: Grace Kodindo; 1960 (age 65–66); Doba, Chad
- Occupation: Obstetrician
- Known for: Reducing maternal mortality in Chad and other poor countries
- Children: 2
- Awards: Chad Medal of Honour, 1997; FIGO/Columbia University Mailman School of Public Health Distinguished Community Service Award for Emergency Obstretric Care, 2000

Grace Kodindo (born 1960) is a Chadian obstetrician who has championed improvements to reproductive healthcare, not only in Chad but in poor countries throughout the world. She has been profiled in two BBC documentaries: Dead Mums Don't Cry (2005), charting her efforts to reduce the mortality rate of pregnant and childbearing women, and Grace Under Fire (2009), reporting on her involvement in a reproductive healthcare programme in the Democratic Republic of Congo.

== Early life and education ==
Grace Kodindo was born in Doba, in the south of Chad, in 1960. She is the daughter of Jean Kodindo Demba, a government official. Like her four brothers and sisters by the same parents and her other siblings, she was sent to school. After completing her secondary school education at the Lycée Félix Éboué in N'Djamena, she received a grant from the Canadian government enabling her to study at the Université de Montréal where she attended medical school.

== Career ==
On her return to Chad, she married Amos Réoulengar who became a member of the Hissene Habre government in 1982. They had two sons together but separated in the late 1990s. In the mid-1980s, Kodindo spent four years in Sudan where she trained as a gynaecologist. In 1990, thanks to a grant from the French government, she set out to reduce the infant mortality rate in Chad which was the highest in the world with 800 deaths per 100,000 births. Even after the grant ran out, she continued to work in hospitals with few resources. Her selfless efforts in the 1990s were recognized by professionals in Europe and North America.

In addition to her medical agenda, Kodindo also taught medical students at the University of N'Djamena. She worked alongside fellow Chadian physician Mariam Brahim from 1997 to 2006, coordinating a country-wide program promoting popular education for children's health in 1999. Kodindo fought against female genital mutilation, raising awareness of the risk of medical complications. As a result of her efforts, in 1997 she was awarded the Chad Medal of Honour and in 2000 she received the FIGO/Columbia University Mailman School of Public Health Distinguished Community Service Award for Emergency Obstetric Care. She established an increasingly closer relationship with Columbia University, eventually teaching at the Mailman School of Public Health.

In 2005, the BBC presented Dead Mums Don't Cry, a documentary on Kodindo's efforts to reduce the number of women in Africa who die during pregnancy or childbirth. At the time pregnant and childbearing women in Chad had a 9% chance of dying. The film was widely screened, forming part of a presentation by Kodindo at New York University in October 2007. The publicity led to the founding of a nonprofit organization "Hope for Grace Kodindo" for funding health programmes for women in poor African countries. As a result of the funding, in May 2008 Kodindo was able to report to the European Parliament that death during childbirth in Chad's largest maternity hospital had been reduced from 14% to 2.3% while death during pregnancy had gone down from 23% to 7.3%. Thanks to widening interest in her work, Kodindo was invited to participate in the RAISE initiative launched by Columbia University and Marie Stopes International.

In 2009, her involvement in a reproductive healthcare programme in the Democratic Republic of Congo led to a second BBC documentary titled Grace Under Fire. It presented the difficulties of childbirth for women living in a war zone. Kodindo commented: "By far the biggest casualties of this conflict are civilians – not the fighters. And the women and children suffer the most – their need is greatest." That year she was awarded the Millennium Development Goal Torch by the Danish Government for striving to provide reproductive healthcare for women throughout the world.
