= Volcan Army =

Chadian insurgent rebel group

- Leaders: Mohamed Baghlani †; Ahmat Acyl †
- Dates active: 1970 – ?
- Split from: FROLINAT
- Headquarters: Tripoli
- Active regions: Chad; Libya
- Ideology: Islamism; Arab ethnic nationalism Anti-communism
- Wars: the Chadian Civil War (1965–1979)

The Volcan Army was a Chadian insurgent rebel group that was active during the First Chadian Civil War. The movement was founded in 1970 by Chadian Arab insurgent leader Mohamed Baghlani, who had been expelled in June from the FROLINAT by the organization's secretary-general Abba Siddick. The new group was islamist and mainly composed of Arabs who shunned Siddick's leadership of the FROLINAT; it was based in Libya. For several years, until about 1975, the Volcan Army had little force on the ground, but after that it slowly expanded. Among the new members in 1976, Ahmat Acyl who attacked Baghlani's authority with the support of Libya in January 1977. When Baghlani died in a car accident in Benghazi on March 27, Acyl became the new leader of the militia with the full support of the Libyan leader Muammar al-Gaddafi, and Acyl became his most loyal man in Chad.

Under Acyl's leadership the group rapidly expanded, coordinating its activities with Oueddei Goukouni's larger People's Armed Forces (FAP) in the prefectures of Biltine and Salamat. While it remained much smaller in numbers than both the FAP and the Armed Forces of the North (FAN), its 400-500 men were reputed to be among the most resolute fighters of the insurgency. Its expansion represented the participation in the civil war of the populations of central Chad, especially of the major Bedouin tribes. The Volcan Army was often accused of tribalism, with its deep suspicion for the zuruq, the blacks, and in particular for the Gorane (i.e. Toubou) which dominated the FAP and FAN.

These suspicions erupted in the summer of 1978 when the Volcan forces attacked, supplied by Qaddafi, the FAP's positions at Faya-Largeau, but were easily repelled. Since the Volcan Army had become by the first months of the year the group most heavily supported by Libya, Goukouni readily understood that the Libyans were behind the attack and retaliated by breaking all ties with Qaddafi.

Relations between Acyl and Goukouni were still frosty in 1979, when Goukouni temporarily allied himself with Hissène Habré in February during the battle of N'Djamena, in which the southern-dominated government disintegrated.

The international community, led by Nigeria, tried to bring order to the expanding chaos in Chad through a series of international peace conferences. But the first peace conference held in March excluded minor factions, like the Volcan Army; as a reaction they created the Front for Joint Provisional Action (FACP), a counter-government supported by Libya and opposed to the new Transitional Government of National Unity (GUNT). As the first compromise proposals failed, the FACP swiftly renamed itself Democratic Revolutionary Council (CDR), and assumed as its leader Ahmat Acyl. By this moment the Volcan Army was to be known as the CDR.
