= Authenticité (Chad) =

François Tombalbaye's attempt to remove foreign influence from Chad

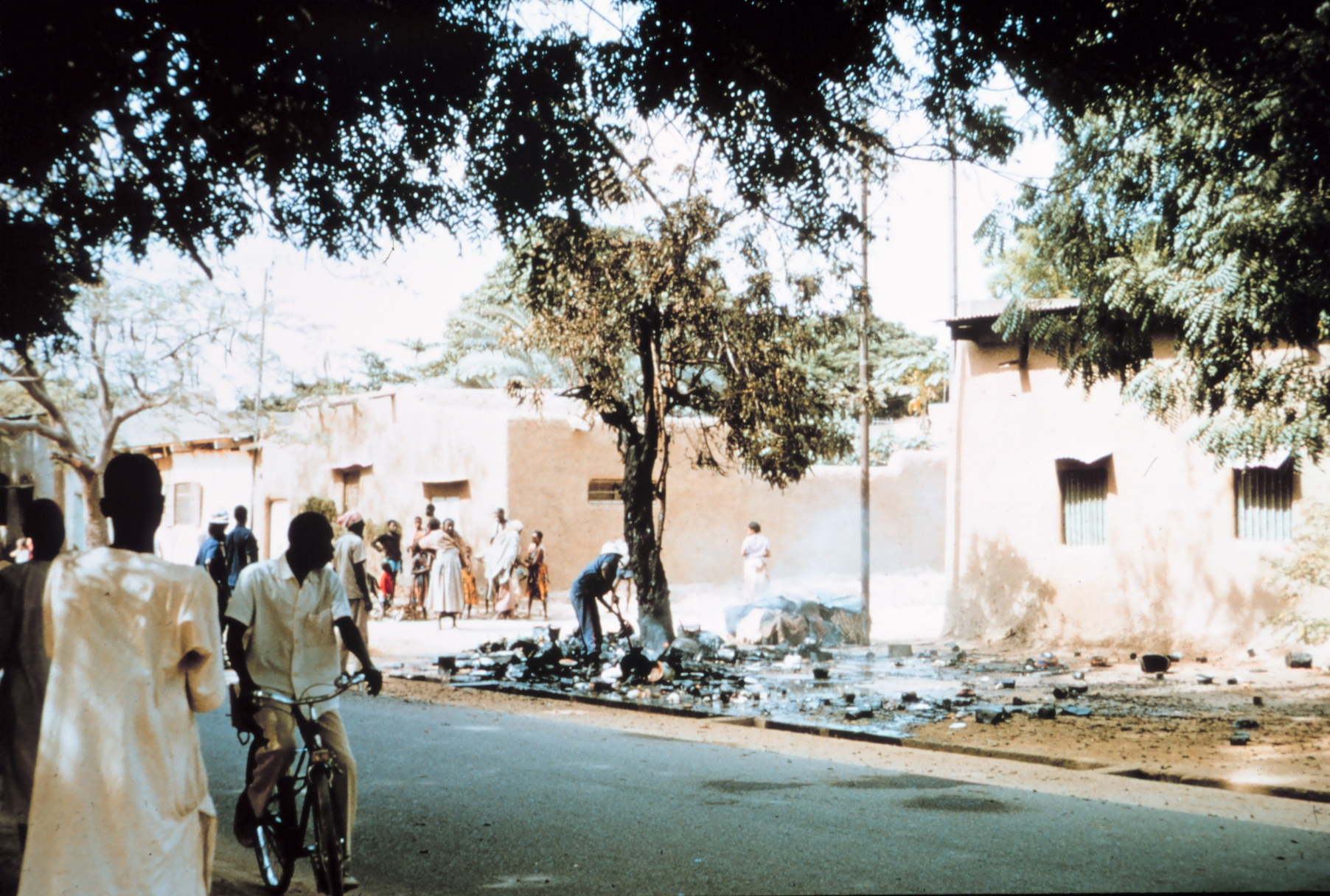
Fort Lamy Street, currently named N'Djaména under Tombalbaye's Authenticité policy.

Authenticité was the name given to the Chadian president François (Ngarta) Tombalbaye's attempt to remove foreign influence and promote southern Chadian culture throughout Chad during the 1970s. One of its most unpopular requirements was that civil servants underwent the yondo initiation rites common only amongst Tombalbaye's own subgroup of Sara people in southern Chad.

A similar concept, also called authenticité, was introduced by Mobutu Sese Seko in Zaïre.
