= Khadidja Touré =

Chadian advocate for human rights (born 1959)

- Born: 1959 (age 66–67)
- Occupation: Vice president of the CST Human Rights Commission
- Known for: Human rights activism

Khadidja Touré (born 1959) is a Chadian human rights advocate. She served as Vice president of the CST Human Rights Commission.

== Career ==
Touré served as vice president of the CST Human Rights Commission, a national body responsible for monitoring and advising on human rights issues in Chad. In her role, she engaged with civil society organizations and international partners to promote the protection of human rights. She participated in forums, conferences, and advocacy initiatives addressing issues such as civil liberties and governance in Chad.
