= Western Armed Forces =

The Western Armed Forces (Forces Armées Occidentales or FAO) is a rebel insurgent group active in Chad during the civil war. An offshoot of the Popular Movement for the Liberation of Chad (Movement Populaire pour la Libération du Tchad or MPLT) born in 1979, the FAO recruited its forces mainly among the Kanembu group located along the shores of Lake Chad and enjoyed support from some political elements in Nigeria. Initially part of the Transitional Government of National Unity (GUNT), the FAO had reportedly divided into pro- and anti-Goukouni factions. Its leader, Moussa Medela, rejected Acheikh ibn Oumar as head of GUNT after Goukouni Oueddei was deposed at the close of 1986. They refused to depose the arms like Goukouni, and were an opposition force also against Idriss Déby, when they merged with other factions to form the Movement for Democracy and Development (MDD), led by Medela.

== See also ==
- FROLINAT
