= Sara people =

Central Sudanic ethnic group

Sara
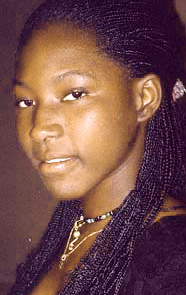
- A Sara woman

Total population
- ~6 million

Regions with significant populations
- Chad, Central African Republic, and South Sudan
- Chad: 5,311,303 (30.5%)
- Central African Republic: 423,281 (7.9%)

Languages
- Sara languages, French

Religion
- Christianity, Sara animism (traditional African religion), Islam

Related ethnic groups
- Bilala people and other Central Sudanic peoples

The Sara people, sometimes referred to as the Kaba, are a Central Sudanic ethnic group native to southern Chad, the northwestern areas of the Central African Republic, and the southern border of South Sudan. They speak the Sara languages which are a part of the Central Sudanic language family. Comprising roughly 30% of Chad's population, they form the largest ethnic group in Chad.

The Sara social order is made up of several patrilineal clans formerly united into a single polity with a national language, national identity, and national religion. Many Sara people have retained their ethnic religion (animism), but some have converted to Christianity and Islam.

== Overview ==
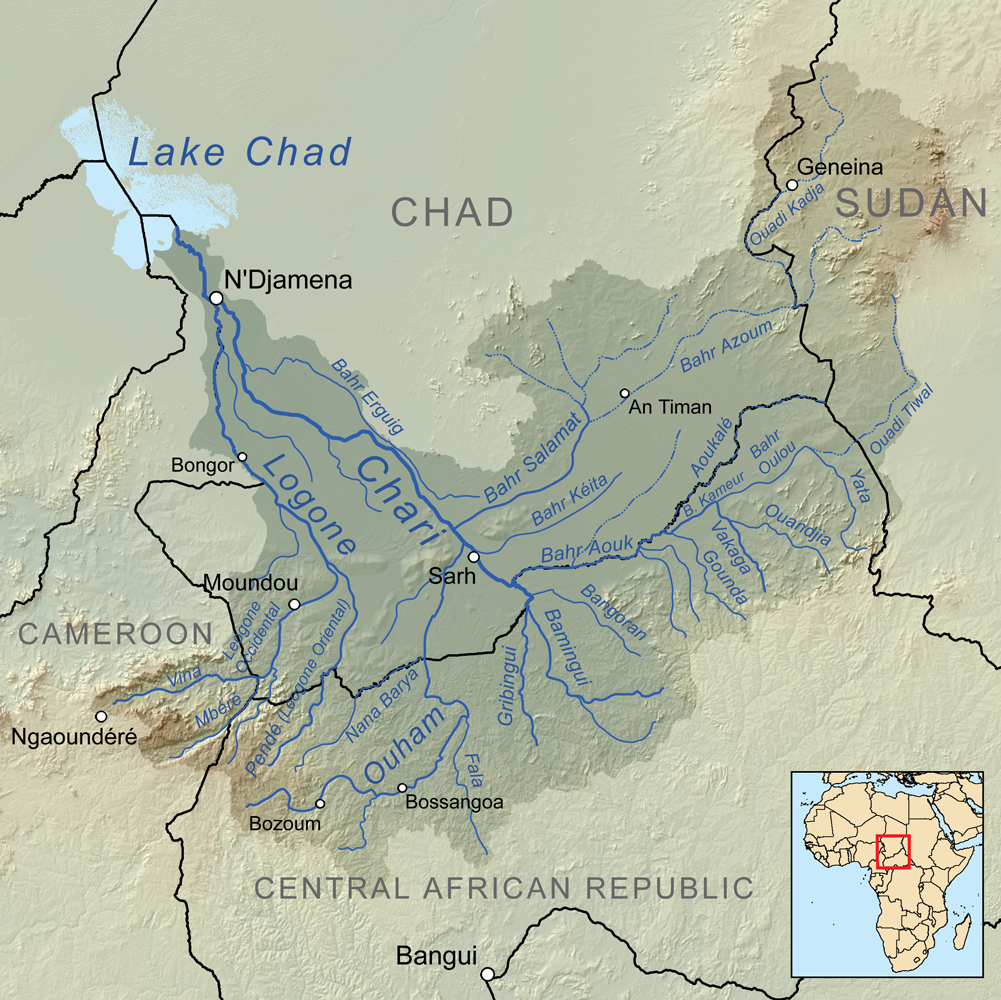
Many Sara people live in the region southeast of Lake Chad, which is irrigated by the Chari and Logone rivers.

=== In Chad ===
The Sara (Kameeni) are the largest ethnic group in the Republic of Chad, concentrated in the Moyen-Chari, the Logone Oriental, the Logone Occidental, and parts of the Tandjile regions. After their arrival, they continued to be the target of violent raids by northern Fulani and Arab people.

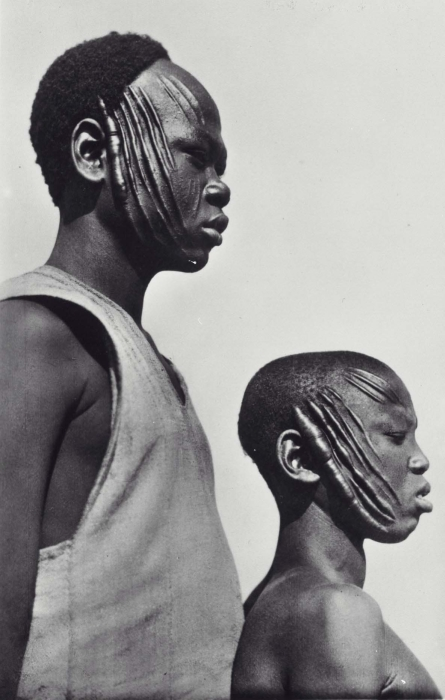
Body scarring rituals have long been a part of Sara culture, affirming community solidarity; both men and women subscribe to it.

The local Muslim groups of what is now Chad, referred to the Sara as "Kirdi", with the term "Kirdi" denoting a non-Muslim person. The Muslim raiders of what is now Chad were autonomously called "Bagirmi", and this geo-political conflict between the Kirdi and the Bagirmi continued through the nineteenth century.

The French colonial empire entered the ongoing hostilities in the early twentieth century, and the Sara people became a part of the French Equatorial Africa, more specifically as part of the "le Tchad utile". The Sara society was transformed by this development, both in terms of culture such as French-based education and training, but also socio-economically because of forced labor and conscription to serve the French military during the World Wars. The French colonial state particularly valued the Sara as workers. Thousands of Sara workers were forced to migrate thousands of kilometers to the south to work on the Congo-Ocean Railway in the 1920s and 30s, where they experienced abuse and high rates of mortality. At the time of independence from France in 1960, the southerners of Chad were more assimilated into French institutions than the northerners. This led to their political dominance of the country after 1960. They were also a part of the civil war with populations in north and central Chad, each population aligning with a different ideology.

=== In the Central African Republic ===
The Sara people make up ten percent of the population of the Central African Republic, making it the fourth largest ethnic group in the country. They live in the northwest part of CAR.

== Culture and religion ==
Subsistence is primarily through hoe farming. Taro, yams, and sweet potatoes are the main staples. Cattle, sheep, goats, chickens, and small horses are also raised.

The Sara people are mainly Christian and animist, with a minority of Muslims.

== Languages ==
The Sara people natively speak the Sara languages, belonging to the Central Sudanic languages of the Nilo-Saharan language family.

== Genetics ==
Analysis of classic genetic markers and DNA polymorphisms by Excoffier et al. (1987) found that the Sara are most closely related to the Kunama people of Eritrea. Both populations speak languages from the Nilo-Saharan family. They are also similar to West African populations, but biologically distinct from the surrounding Cushitic and Ethiopian Semitic Afro-Asiatic-speaking groups.

== Notable Sara people ==
- Sosthene Moguenara, Chadian-born German track and field athlete
- Fidèle Moungar, Prime Minister of Chad in 1993, president of Action for Unity and Socialism
- Noël Milarew Odingar, who overthrew Tombalbaye during the 1975 coup
- Kalthouma Nguembang, only woman in Chadian National Assembly in 1968
- François Tombalbaye, first President of Chad
- Japhet N'Doram
- Ange-Félix Patassé, President of Central African Republic from 1993 to 2003
- Martin Ziguélé, Former Prime Minister of Central African Republic

== See also ==
- Demographics of Chad
- Demographics of the Central African Republic
