= Jacques Doumro =

Chadian general

Jacques Doumro was a Chadian general during the Tombalbaye Regime.

Doumro joined the French Army when he was nineteen years old, and fought in the Second World War, becoming a non-commissioned officer in the French Colonial Forces. With the independence of his country in 1960 Doumro made a rapid career, becoming General and Chief-of-Staff of the Chadian Armed Forces.

Doumro gained popularity, especially among students, for his firm stand against the President François Tombalbaye regarding the question of the modernization of the army and the recruitment and establishment of a professional corps; so when the students of the Felix Eboué High School demonstrated in November 1971 in the capital against the government, a prevalent slogan was a call for Doumro to take power: "Vive l'Armee, vive le General Doumro", raising for the first time the spectre of the entry of the military into the political scene.

Doumro paid for the willingness shown to be flexible and to listen to the students complaints; once the demonstrations had ceased, Tombalbaye removed Doumro from his post and put him under house arrest, replacing him with the Colonel Félix Malloum. Many purges in the military followed, and Doumro was arrested a second time between 1973 and 1975. These constant purges eventually led to the fall of Tombalbaye, who was killed in 1975 in a military coup.
