= Noël Milarew Odingar =

Military leader of Chad in 1975

Noël Milarew Odingar (5 May 1932 – 29 April 2007) was a Chadian military officer who served as head of state for two days after the 1975 coup d'état. He was subsequently one of the nine members of the Supreme Military Council, the military junta that ruled Chad between 1975 and 1978.

An ethnic Sara, Odingar was born on 5 May 1932. As a graduate of the French military academy he had a rapid career, and in 1965 Odingar, with the grade of Major, took the post as commander of the Chadian Armed Forces (FAT), a choice that strengthened Sara dominance of the government.

By 1968 the military situation in the country had badly deteriorated, after the creation of the rebel insurgent group FROLINAT in 1966 and the consequent loss of control by the government of many of the country's Muslim regions. As a result, President François Tombalbaye asked France to send troops to help defeat the rebels; the only ones who opposed themselves, in vain, to this decision, were Minister Bangui and Colonel Odingar, who objected that the project would indicate Chad's suzerainty.

As the years passed, Odingar gained further promotions: by early 1975 he had become general and acting commander of the FAT's 4,000 troops. Great discontent was brewing in the army's ranks: in the last two years Tombalbaye's action had become more and more erratic, and in 1973 he had thrown in jail the FAT's commander-general Félix Malloum. It was another purge in the army, in which Tombalbaye had arrested the commanders of the gendarmerie (the military police), that triggered the 1975 coup: on the morning of 13 April units of the gendarmerie attacked the Presidential Palace. While these were fighting with the President's guard, Odingar arrived bringing reinforcements and assuming command. All fighting ended by 8:30 am, with Tombalbaye reportedly dying from the wounds received in the battle and the coupists triumphantly taking the palace. There was no other resistance: already at 6:30 am Odingar had spoken to the radio announcing the armed forces had "exercised their responsibilities before God and the nation" while the capital's population poured into the streets to celebrate the death of Tombalbaye.

Odingar and the army justified their actions in a military communique that accused Tombalbaye of having divided the country, putting the tribes one against the other, and of having humiliated the military. In the meanwhile Odingar, acting as interim commander and head of state, sealed off all roads to the capital and imposed a curfew on the city.

Félix Malloum and the other jailed officers were immediately freed by the coupists. Already on 15 April a Supreme Military Council (Conseil Superieur Militaire or CSM) was formed, a nine-member military junta whose President was chosen to be Malloum, who so peacefully succeeded to Odingar as head of state.

== See also ==
- The Tombalbaye Regime
- FROLINAT

Political offices
Preceded by François Tombalbaye	Head of State of Chad; 1975	Succeeded by Félix Malloum
