= Mangalmé riots =

- Mubi uprising
- Date: September 2, 1965 - October 1965
- Location: Guera Prefecture, Chad
- Caused by: Increase in income tax Corruption
- Goals: Lower income tax
- Methods: Rioting
- Result: Riots crushed Civil war in Chad begins

Parties
| Mubi rioters | Chadian government |

Casualties and losses
| 500 killed | 10 government officials killed |

The Mangalmé riots also called Mangalme Rebellion or Mubi Uprising were a series of riots in central Chad, starting in the village of Mangalmé in the Guéra Prefecture on September 2, 1965. Riots started after a tax increase on personal income. In some areas the tax was tripled. Civilians of the area also accused government of tax collection abuses and corruption. Government called the tax increase "a loan" to finance necessary projects in the area. Riots rapidly spread to all of Guéra Prefecture. During the riots ten government officials were killed, including the local deputy to the National Assembly. After this the government sent in the military and crushed the riots, and 500 people were killed. It is generally believed that this event started the Chadian Civil War.
