= Chadian National Union =

Chadian National Union Union nationale tchadienne
- Leader: Issa Dana; Mahamut Outman; Abba Siddick
- Founded: 1958
- Dissolved: 1966
- Succeeded by: FROLINAT
- Ideology: Islamic socialism; Chadian nationalism; Left-wing nationalism; Anti-imperialism; Anti-colonialism
- Political position: Far-left
- Religion: Islam

The Chadian National Union (French: Union nationale tchadienne, UNT) was a radical Muslim political party in Chad.

== History ==
The party was founded in 1958 by Issa Dana, Mahamut Outman and Abba Siddick. Created to lobby the "no" vote to the referendum on Chad's entry in the French Community, the party advocated drastic political reforms, to be achieved if necessary through violence. The party was banned in 1962 when President François Tombalbaye proclaimed the Chadian Progressive Party the sole legal party. It survived as a clandestine organization under the leadership of Ibrahim Abatcha.

In 1966 the party merged with the General Union of the Children of Chad to form the National Liberation Front of Chad (FROLINAT).
