= Abba Siddick =

Abba Siddick (December 25, 1924 – December 1, 2017) was a Chadian politician and revolutionary. He entered active politics in the Chadian Progressive Party (PPT), a nationalist and radical African political party founded in 1947 and led by Gabriel Lisette. By 1958, he had left the PPT to form with others the Chadian National Union (UNT), a Muslim progressive party, but he turned quite early to the PPT and, after the independence of Chad, was minister of Education of the President François Tombalbaye. However the President's discrimination against Muslims in Chad brought him to become a member of the rebel insurgent group FROLINAT, formed in 1966 to oppose the rule of Tombalbaye. After the death of the organization's first secretary-general in 1968, a vicious battle for leadership ensued, which terminated with the victory of Siddick in 1969, even though he was perceived as an Anti-Arab and suspected of being a moderate leftist and not having any revolutionary apprenticeship. He made Tripoli the headquarters of the front; and Libya took the place of Sudan as the key supplier of the FROLINAT. While he was internationally recognized as the head of the FROLINAT, he was losing control of the units on the ground. In 1971 he tried to reassert his authority by proposing to unify the insurgent forces active in Chad, but Goukouni Oueddei, head of the Second Liberation Army of the FROLINAT, broke with Siddick, who managed to at least keep a loose control over the First Liberation Army.

Siddick's fragile authority depended much on Libyan support (which was official from 1971) but when in 1973 there was a rapprochement between Libya and Chad, Siddick was forced to move his headquarters from Tripoli to Algiers. What nominal control was left over the troops on the ground completely vanished in 1976, when almost all his cadres rebelled against his authority and accused him of never listening to his lieutenants and of never going himself to the field of operations. The rebels, led by Mahamat Abba Saïd, assumed control over most of the First Liberation Army of the FROLINAT, that became known under his leadership simply as the First Army. Two years later, in 1978, he lost even his formal leadership of the movement when in a congress of the FROLINAT held in Faya-Largeau, Goukouni was nominated leader.

The collapse of all central authority in Chad, in 1979, gave Siddick as leader of a so-called "Original FROLINAT" (FROLINAT Originel) a chance to re-enter the fray. But he, Ahmat Acyl, Mohamat Said, and Adoum Dana were excluded from the first peace conference held at Kano in Nigeria in March.

When these excluded people threatened to build a counter-government, they were invited to a new peace conference at Kano, in April. In this meeting, the resolution of Hissène Habré and Goukouni Oueddei to not let those not present at Kano I to enter in the new government failed, as Sidick, Dana, and Acyl were accused by both of not having any troops on the ground.

In retaliation, a pro-Libyan counter-government was formed by Siddick, Acyl, and Said, called Front for Joint Provisional Action (FACP), shortly after called Democratic Revolutionary Council (CDR).

This led to the first conference of Lagos, which was boycotted by the major forces: only at the second and last peace conference at Lagos did the Transitional Government of National Unity (GUNT) finally emerge, in which all forces were represented. In the Lagos Accord, approved on the August 21, Goukouni Oueddei became president, Habré defence minister, Acyl foreign minister and siddick health minister.

Siddick at first remained with Goukouni when Habré broke with the GUNT in 1980, but when in January 1981 Goukouni and the Libyan President Qaddafi issued a joint communiqué stating that Chad and Libya had agreed to "work for the realization of complete unity between the two countries", he and the Union pour la démocratie et la paix (UDP) tried to depose Goukouni and become independent of Libya. Shortly after this, Siddick broke with the GUNT and fled in exile to Sudan, ceasing to play any part in the civil war. Siddick died in Paris on December 1, 2017, at age 92.
