= Lagos Accord =

1979 Chadian Civil War peace treaty

The Lagos Accord was a peace agreement signed on 21 August 1979, by representatives of eleven warring factions of the Chadian Civil War, after a conference in Lagos, Nigeria. The accord established the procedures for setting up the Transitional Government of National Unity (GUNT), which was sworn into office in November, 1979. By mutual agreement, Goukouni Oueddei was named president, Wadel Abdelkader Kamougué was appointed vice-president, and Hissène Habré was named minister of national defense, veterans, and war victims. The distribution of cabinet positions was balanced between south (eleven portfolios), north, center, and east (thirteen), and among protégés of neighboring states.

A peacekeeping mission of the Organisation of African Unity (OAU), to be drawn from troops from Republic of the Congo, Guinea, and Benin, was to replace the French. This force never materialized in any effective sense.

The participants of GUNT deeply mistrusted each other, and they never achieved a sense of coherence. As a result, the various factional militias remained armed. By January 1980, a unit of Habré's army was attacking the forces of one of the constituent groups of GUNT in Ouaddaï Prefecture, and the Chadian conflict soon reached new heights of intensity with widespread destruction of life and property.

== See also ==
- Kano Accord
- FROLINAT
- History of Chad

== Sources ==
- Library of Congress Country Study
