= François Tombalbaye =

President of Chad from 1960 to 1975

- فرنسوا تومبالباي
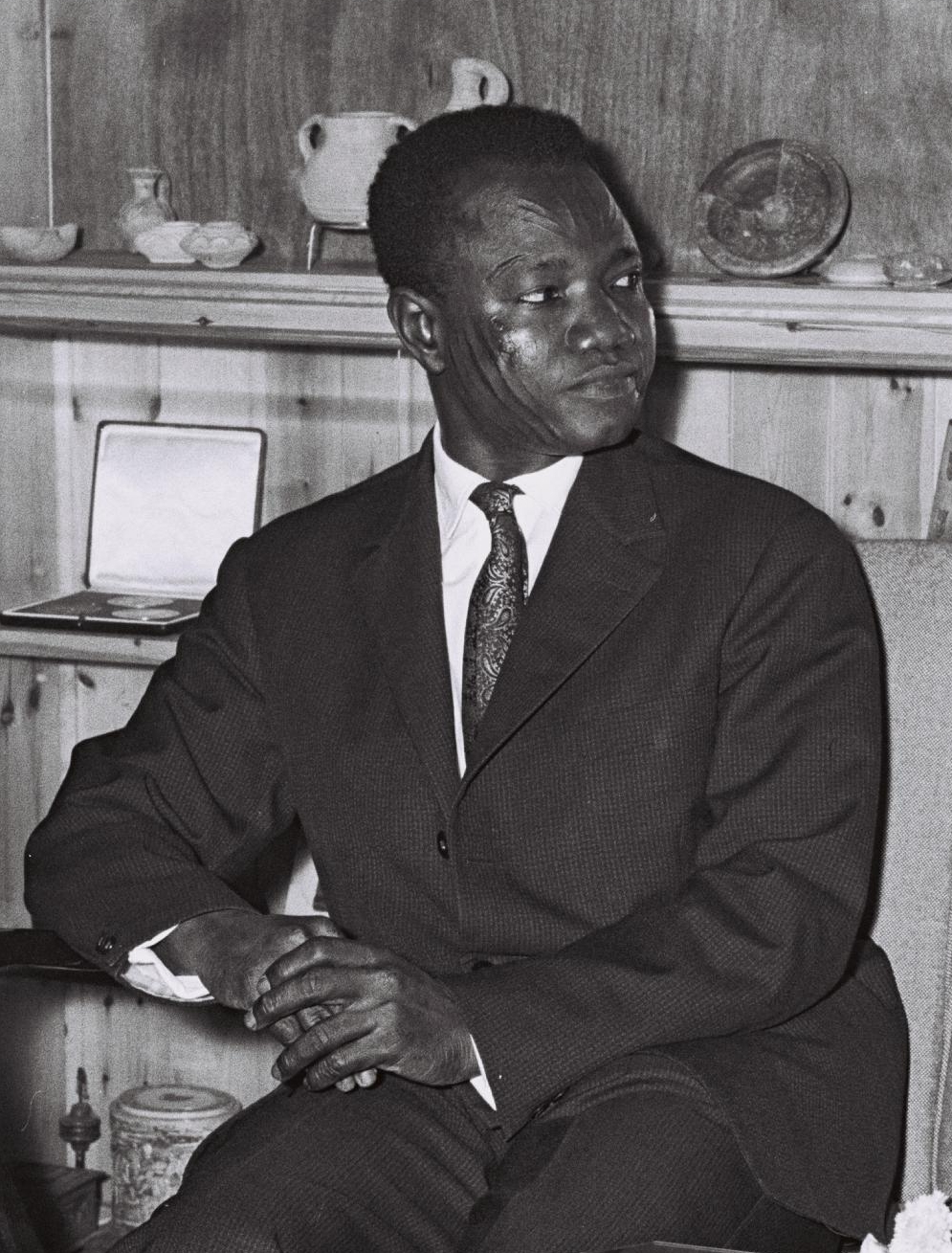
- Tombalbaye in 1959

1st President of Chad
- In office 11 August 1960 – 13 April 1975
- Prime Minister: None
- Succeeded by: Noël Milarew Odingar (as interim head of state)

Colonial Prime Minister of Chad
- In office 26 March 1959 – 11 August 1960
- Preceded by: Ahmed Koulamallah (as President of Provisional Govt.)
- Succeeded by: Hissène Habré (as PM of independent Chad, in 1978)

Personal details
- Born: François Tombalbaye فرنسوا تومبالباي; 15 June 1918 Béssada, Chad, French Equatorial Africa
- Died: 13 April 1975 (aged 56) N'Djamena, Chad
- Cause of death: Murdered by soldiers in the 1975 Chadian coup d'état
- Party: PPT (1947–1973); MNRCS (1973–1975)
- Profession: Teacher trade unionist
- Religion: Protestant

Military service
- Allegiance: Chad
- Branch/service: Free French Forces
- Battles/wars: World War II; Chadian Civil War (1965–1979) †

François Tombalbaye (Arabic: فرنسوا تومبالباي Franswā Tūmbālbāy; 15 June 1918 – 13 April 1975), also known as N'Garta Tombalbaye, was a Chadian politician who served as the first President of Chad from the country's independence in 1960 until his overthrow in 1975. A dictatorial leader, his divisive policies as president led to factional conflict and a pattern of authoritarian leadership and political instability that is still relevant in Chad today.

A native of the south of the country and a member of the Sara ethnic group, Tombalbaye began his career as a teacher during French colonial rule and joined the Chadian Progressive Party (PPT) in 1946. After serving in the colonial legislature in the 1950s, he succeeded Gabriel Lisette as the PPT's leader in 1959 and was appointed the country's first president upon gaining independence in 1960. In 1962, he declared the PPT the sole legal party and presided over a corrupt dictatorship characterized by extreme favoritism to his southern-based patronage network. In addition to his dictatorial rule, he also attempted an Africanization program that worsened the divide between the Muslim north and the Christian and animist south. In 1965, tax riots erupted into a civil war between his government and northern FROLINAT rebels. During the war, his regime was supported by France, while FROLINAT was supported by Libyan leader Muammar Gaddafi.

In 1973, he founded a new party, the National Movement for the Cultural and Social Revolution (MNRCS), changed his name to N'Garta Tombalbaye and attempted to further Africanize the country through a program of authenticité. As the civil war continued and his support in the south dwindled, particularly over his imposition of yondo, a form of ritual scarring on members of the civil service and military, he was overthrown and assassinated by members of the Chadian military during the 1975 Chadian coup d'état and replaced by Félix Malloum.

== Early life ==
Tombalbaye was born on 15 June 1918 in the village of Bessada, in the southern region of the French colony of Chad, close to the city of Koumra. His father was a prominent trader and he was of the Sara ethnic group, the prominent ethnicity of Chad's five southern prefectures. He attended a primary school run by Protestant missionaries, in Sarh and secondary school in Brazzaville. As a young man, Tombalbaye studied to become an educator in Brazzaville, due to the lack of in-country schools.

During World War II, Tombalbaye fought for Free France against the Nazi-backed Vichy regime.

== Early political career ==
In 1946/7, Tombalbaye formed a chapter of the Chadian Progressive Party (PPT) in Sarh and rallied members of his clan and other Sara speakers to the party. After a Muslim trader mocked the Sara people as mere beasts in November 1947, he helped to direct violent protest in N'Djamena. In 1949, the French government revoked his teaching position as punishment to his involvement in political activism. A year later, he went on to direct the PPT newspaper, AEF Nouvelle, which was shut down the same year after French repression. In 1952, he won a seat in the colonial territorial assembly and was elected to French Equatorial Africa general council in 1957, where he served as vice-president. Tensions between him and Lisette grew in the late 1950s after the 1956 loi-cadre reforms where individual colonies politicians were allowed to negotiate their own constituents, rather than maintain the federation of colonies of French Equatorial Africa. He later succeeded Gabriel Lisette as head of the Chadian Progressive Party (PPT) in March 1959 after coming under pressure, heading Chad's colonial government from 1959. He ruled the country during its independence on 11 August 1960, and was appointed its first head of government.

== Presidency ==
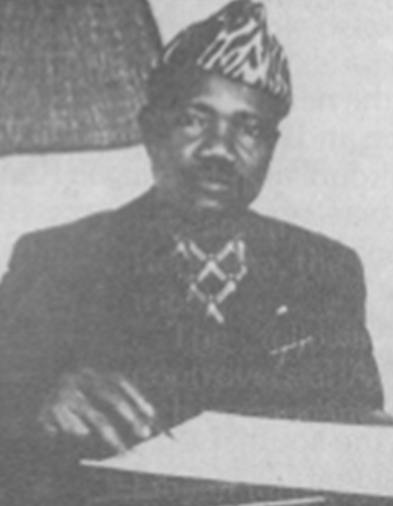
Tombalbaye in the 1970s

Tombalbaye managed to create a coalition of progressive forces from both the north and south of the country and isolating the more conservative Islamic factions in the center as a colonial legislator. After independence, he adopted an autocratic form of government, eliminated opposition both within his party and outside his party by banning all other political parties. In 1963 Tombalbaye dissolved the National Assembly in response to rioting. He began nationalizing the civil service, replacing French administrators with less competent locals. He imposed a "National Loan", greatly increasing taxing, to fund the nationalization.

In October 1968, Tombalbaye was a guest of President Lyndon B. Johnson in Washington, D.C. Following brief talks with Johnson, he traveled to Texas, meeting with research scientists at ICASALS (International Center for Arid and Semiarid Land Studies), part of Texas Tech University.

Tombalbaye's Africanization program failed to account for the large population in the north and center of the country, who were Muslim and did not identify with the Christian and animist south. The Gorane saw independence as a shift of control from French colonials to the south. On 1 November 1965, riots in Guéra Prefecture led to 500 deaths as a result of protest against high taxes and corruption. This sparked a series of disturbances throughout the north and center of the country, compounded by involvement by Chad's neighbors, Libya to the north and Sudan to the east. The most prominent movement in this period was the FROLINAT, or 'National Liberation Front of Chad', based in Sudan. Though FROLINAT was plagued by rivalry and division, it was able to resist Tombalbaye's authoritarianism. Tombalbaye called upon France, Chad's former colonial power, for assistance, citing treaties two countries had signed at independence.

France agreed to enter the fray, provided that Tombalbaye initiate a series of reforms to the army, government, and civil service. Taxes and laws imposed arbitrarily by Tombalbaye were to be rescinded, and the country's traditional sultans had their role as tax collectors restored, for which they received 10% of the income. He agreed to France's terms in 1969 and Chad embarked on a gradual liberalization process. In elections in 1969, several hundred political prisoners were released from prison, but Tombalbaye was still the only candidate on the ballot.

A further sign of liberalization came in 1971 when Tombalbaye admitted to the Congress of the PPT that he had made mistakes. Steps were taken to reform the government, and more Gorane were included in his new government. Order seemed to have been restored, and France withdrew its troops from the country.

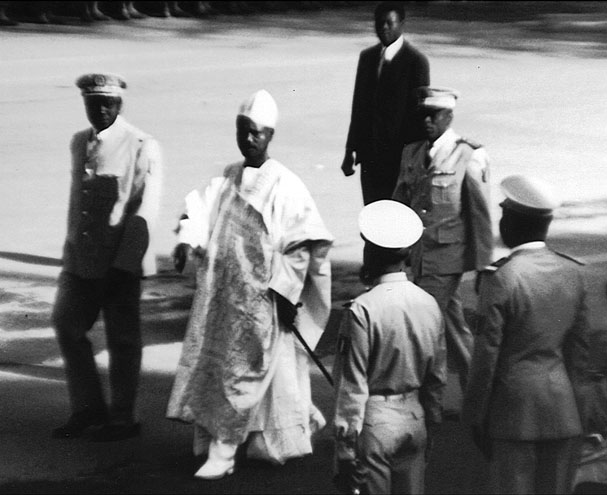
President Tombalbaye marching in a parade celebrating the tenth anniversary of independence.

During the early 1970s, he chose to follow DRC strongman Mobutu Sese Seko in his move towards remaking African cultural institutions.

Progress came to a grinding halt in August 1971, when an attempted coup d'état with links to Libyan leader Muammar al-Gaddafi was uncovered. Tombalbaye immediately severed relations with his northern neighbor and even allowed anti-Gaddafi forces to operate from his territory. In return, Qadhafi granted formal recognition and aid to what remained of the FROLINAT opposition to Tombalbaye. Meanwhile, in the south, where Tombalbaye had his greatest support, he responded to a strike by students by replacing the popular Chief of Staff Jacques Doumro with Colonel Félix Malloum. Chad was in the grip of a crippling drought, and Tombalbaye rescinded his amnesty to political prisoners. By the end of 1972, over 1,000 political prisoners had been arrested. At the same time, he also made overtures to the Arab world, reducing Libyan support for, and fomenting infighting in, FROLINAT.

Nevertheless, Tombalbaye felt insecure with his own government as well. Tombalbaye arrested major PPT leaders, including Malloum, for allegedly using witchcraft to overthrow him in what was known as the "Black Sheep Plot", for the animals they allegedly sacrificed. The politician Kalthouma Nguembang was also implicated in this plot; she was arrested and tortured as a result.

In August, Tombalbaye disbanded the PPT and replaced it with the National Movement for the Cultural and Social Revolution (MNRCS). Under the guise of authenticité, the new movement promoted Africanization: the capital Fort-Lamy was renamed N'Djamena and Tombalbaye himself changed his given name to N'Garta. Christianity was disparaged, missionaries were expelled, and all non-Muslim males in the south, including students, businessmen, college professors and even government ministers, were required to undergo traditional initiation rites known as yondo to gain promotion in the civil service and the military. These rites, however, were native to only one of Chad's ethnic groups, Tombalbaye's own Sara people, and even then only to a subgroup of that people. To everyone else, the rituals, which included floggings, burning with coals, scarification and mock burials while being left in only loincloths, were harsh and foreign.

== Overthrow and death ==
Meanwhile, the drought worsened throughout Africa, so to improve the dismal economy, people were forced to "volunteer" in a major effort to increase cotton production. With his support in the south diminished, Tombalbaye lashed out at the army, making arbitrary promotions and demotions. Finally, on 13 April 1975, after some of the country's leading officers had been arrested for involvement in an alleged coup, he was reportedly shot in his own palace, succumbing to his gunshot wounds afterwards. His body was secretly buried in Faya. The military installed Félix Malloum, by then a general, as the new head of state.

== See also ==
- Decolonization in Chad
- Tombalbaye government

Political offices
Preceded by (none)	Head of State of Chad; 1960–1975	Succeeded by Noël Milarew Odingar
