= Second Battle of N'Djamena =

1980 battle during the Chadian–Libyan War

- Part of Chadian-Libyan conflict
Date	March 22 – December 15, 1980
Location	N'Djamena, Chad
Result	Libyan victory: N'Djamena captured; Chad occupied by Libya; Chadian-Libyan merger

Belligerents
FROLINAT; GUNT; FAP; Libya (from December); Supported by: American and British mercenaries	FAN; FAT; Supported by: France (until May); China; Egypt; Sudan

Commanders and leaders
Goukouni Oueddei (Libya) Muammar Gaddafi (Libya) Radwan Radwan	(Chad) Hissène Habré

Strength
~5,500; 5,000; ~60 tanks ~40 armored vehicles Numerous Mi-25s, SF.260s and Tu-22s	4,000

Casualties and losses
- 5,000 – 10,000 killed 1 Mi-25 destroyed ~20 tanks and vehicles destroyed or disabled

The Second Battle of N'Djamena was a large scale and bloody battle during the Chadian-Libyan conflict. While initially fought between Chadian proxies, it eventually resulted in Libya's direct intervention, and was Gaddafi's first military victory in the conflict.

== Background ==
The First Battle of N'Djamena was fought from February to March in 1979, resulting in the Kano Accord being brokered by the OAU, primarily Nigeria, and France. As a result, Goukouni Oueddei was made interim head of state, and Hissène Habré made minister of defense.

Habré however was anti-Libyan and ruthless in his ambition, causing him to position himself against Oueddei's pro-Libyan government

== Early fighting ==
On March 22, 1980, clashes broke out between Habré's FAN and Oueddei's FAP in N'Djamena, which quickly escalated to a full-scale battle with thousands wounded and hundreds dead within 10 days, and half the city's population fleeing to neighboring Cameroon.

On April 3 the last remaining OAU peacekeepers from Congo-Brazzaville were withdrawn, and various attempts at ceasefires were mediated by Togolese president Gnassingbé Eyadéma and OAU secretary-general Edem Kodjo. However, all of these ultimately fell through, and hostilities continued. In May, the 1,100 French troops stationed in N'Djamena withdrew as Opération Tacaud came to a close.

== Libyan intervention ==
Muammar Gaddafi had been supplying Oueddei with weapons and advisers since April, but on October 9 the LAAF was used to capture Faya-Largeau from FAN and turn it into a supply and transport hub.
As few Libyan pilots were qualified to pilot the Air Force's CH-47Cs and C-130s, American and British mercenaries hired by rogue and active CIA Agents Edwin Wilson and Frank Terpil were used to transport immense amounts of supplies, ammunition, equipment and troops to Faya-Largeau, including 100 T-55s, T-62s and BTR-60s, as well as Crotale SAMs and BM-21 Grads.

Once preparations were complete, this equipment along with some 4,000 GUNT troops was deployed into an attack on N'Djamena on December 8, under cover of Mi-25s and SF.260s. The first assault did not go well, with FAN employing captured RPG-7s to destroy some 20 Libyan vehicles, and a captured SA-7 to shoot down an Mi-25 with the serial number 103.

On December 12 the Libyans employed several batteries of D-30 and M-46 artillery and began bombarding N'Djamena with more than 10,000 shells, along with support from SF.260s and Tu-22s. A Vietnam War veteran watching from Cameroon reported that the fighting was heavier than what he had experienced in Huế during the Tet Offensive. The city was bombarded for a week and nearly destroyed, with Habré forced to retreat into Cameroon, while the rest of the FAN fought rear guard actions until December 15, when they escaped into Sudan.

== Aftermath ==
Gaddafi had managed to move some 5,000 troops, 500 vehicles, numerous artillery pieces, Air Force contingents, along with all their necessary supplies 1,300 km in under 1 month and accomplish his goal.

However, Oueddei was forced to sign a merger that virtually united Chad and Libya, causing outrage amongst Africa. Oueddei, under pressure of France and several states of the OAU, forced the departure of all Libyan soldiers from Chad.
