= Battle of N'Djamena (1979) =

Confrontation in the Chadian Civil War

- Part of the Chadian Civil War (1965–1979)
Date	12–15 February 1979
Location	N'Djamena, Chad
Result	Ceasefire agreement

Belligerents
(Chad) FAN rebels	Government of Chad

Commanders and leaders
(Chad) Hissène Habré	(Chad) Félix Malloum

Casualties and losses
- Several thousand civilians killed Unknown number of military casualties

The Battle of N'Djamena in 1979 also called First Battle of N'Djamena was fought between government forces loyal to the President Malloum and FAN rebels led by Prime Minister Habre. After three days of street fighting in N'Djamena, Sudan mediated the conflict between the two parties. After three days of negotiations Malloum and Habre agreed to a ceasefire.

== Background ==
Hissène Habré was previously a commander of FROLINAT rebels, before splitting from FROLINAT together with Goukouni Oueddei after Abba Siddick assumed leadership of FROLINAT. After disagreements with Oueddei, Habré formed his own rebel group called Armed Forces of the North. In August 1978, he allied with President Félix Malloum who gave him the posts of Prime Minister and Vice President. In January 1979, Habré and Malloum disagreed over the interpretation of the reconciliation charter which started military hostilities in the city.

== Fighting ==
The battle began on 12 February 1979, when FAN rebels and the Military of Chad engaged in open warfare in the city. The Chadian military carried out massacres against the city's Muslim population, during which several thousand civilians were killed. The fighting ended on 15 February, when negotiations mediated by President of Sudan Numayri had begun.

== Aftermath ==
FROLINAT rebels used the fighting in N'Djamena and breakdown of central government to launch a new offensive in the north.

Further conflict between Habré and Malloum caused several countries to try to mediate the conflict, which resulted in a new national government being formed in November 1979. In this government, Habré was appointed as a Minister of Defense. However, fighting soon resumed. In December 1980, Habré fled to Sudan in exile during the closing days of the Second Battle of N'Djamena.
