= Chad under Félix Malloum =

The 1975 coup d'état in Chad that terminated Tombalbaye's government received an enthusiastic response in the capital N'Djamena. Félix Malloum emerged as the chairman of the new Supreme Military Council (Conseil Supérieur Militaire or CSM), and the first days of the new regime were celebrated as many political prisoners were released. His government included more Muslims from northern and eastern Chad, but ethnic and regional dominance still remained very much in the hands of southerners.

== Economic policies ==
The successor government soon overturned many of Tombalbaye's more odious policies. For example, the CSM attempted to distribute external drought relief assistance more equitably and efficiently, devised plans to develop numerous economic reforms, including reductions in taxes and government expenditures, and abandoned some of the more oppressive measures used to encourage cotton production.

== Political control and opposition ==
Neither reformers nor skilled administrators, the new military leaders were unable to retain for long the modicum of authority, legitimacy, and popularity that they had gained through their overthrow of the unpopular Tombalbaye. The expectations of most urban Chadians far exceeded the capacity of the new government, or possibly any government, to satisfy them. Moreover, it soon became clear that the new leaders, who were mostly southern military officers, saw themselves as caretakers rather than innovators, and few of Tombalbaye's close associates were punished. Throughout its tenure, the CSM was unable to win the support of the capital's increasingly radicalized unions, students, and urban dwellers. The government suspended the National Union of Chadian Workers (Union Nationale de Travailleurs du Tchad or UNTT) and prohibited strikes, but labour and urban unrest continued from 1975 through 1978. On the first anniversary of the formation of the CSM, Malloum was the target of a grenade attack that injured several top officials and spectators. A year after that, in March 1977, the CSM executed summarily the leaders of a short-lived mutiny by several military units in N'Djamena.

== Foreign relations and growing dissension ==
The fundamental failures of Malloum's government, however, were most evident in its interactions with France, Libya, and FROLINAT. In his first few months in office, Malloum persuaded a few eastern rebel elements to join the new government. In the north, the derde (Oueddei Kichidemi) returned from exile in Libya in August 1975. But his son, Goukouni Oueddei, refused to respond to his entreaties or those of the government and remained in opposition. When the Command Council of the Armed Forces of the North (Conseil de Commandement des Forces Armées du Nord or CCFAN), a structure set up in 1972 by Hissène Habré and Goukouni to represent northern elements in FROLINAT, continued to refuse negotiations with the CSM over the release of the French archaeologist hostage, France began dealing directly with the rebels. Malloum's government reacted to this embarrassment by demanding the departure of 1,500 French troops, at a time in late 1975 when Chad's military situation was beginning to worsen. Throughout 1976 and 1977, the military balance of power shifted in favor of FROLINAT as Libya provided the rebels with substantially more weaponry and logistical support than ever before. Faya Largeau was placed under siege twice in 1976, and then in June 1977 Bardaï fell to the CCFAN.

== Goukouni and Habré ==
The sharp increase in Libyan activity also brought to a head the power struggle within the CCFAN between Goukouni and Habré. In 1971 Habré had left his position as a deputy prefect in the Tombalbaye government to join Goukouni's rebels. Goukouni and Habré, ambitious Toubou leaders from two different and competing clans, became bitter rivals, first within the CCFAN and later within all of Chad. In the CCFAN, the key issues dividing the men were relations with Libya and the handling of the hostage affair. Habré opposed vigorously all Libyan designs on the Aozou Strip and favored retaining the French hostage even after most of the ransom demands had been met. Goukouni felt that priority should go to the conflict with the CSM, for which Libyan assistance could be decisive, and that the kidnapping had already achieved more than enough. Habré finally split with him in 1976, taking a few hundred followers to fight in Batha and Biltine prefectures and retaining for his group the name Armed Forces of the North (FAN). Goukouni and his followers prevailed (the CCFAN released the hostage to French authorities in January 1977).

As the military position of the CSM continued to decline in 1977, Malloum's political overtures to the rebel groups and leaders became increasingly flexible. In September Malloum and Habré met in Khartoum to begin negotiations on a formal alliance. Their efforts culminated in a carefully drafted agreement, the Fundamental Charter, which formed the basis of the National Union Government of August 1978. Malloum was named president of the new government, while Habré, as prime minister, became the first significant insurgent figure to hold an executive position in a postcolonial government.

Habré's ascension to power in N'Djamena was intended to signal to Goukouni and other rebel leaders the government's willingness to negotiate seriously following its reversals on the battlefield in 1978. In February Faya Largeau fell to FROLINAT, and with it roughly half the country's territory. Shortly thereafter, Malloum flew to Sabha in southern Libya to negotiate a cease-fire, but even as it was being codified in March, FROLINAT's position was hardening. Goukouni claimed that all three liberation armies were now united under his leadership in the new People's Armed Forces (Forces Armées Populaires or FAP) and that their objective remained the overthrow of the "dictatorial neocolonial regime imposed by France on Chad since August 11, 1960". FAP continued to advance toward the capital until it was halted near Ati in major battles with French military forces and units of the Chadian Armed Forces (Forces Armées Tchadiennes or FAT). It was Malloum's hope that the FROLINAT leadership would soften its terms, or possibly undergo renewed fragmentation.
