= Command Council of the Armed Forces of the North =

- Active: 1972-1976 (Chadian Civil War)

Commanders
- Notable commanders: Goukouni Oueddei, Hissène Habré

The Command Council of the Armed Forces of the North French: Conseil de Commandement des Forces Armées du Nord or CCFAN) was a Chadian rebel army active during the Chadian Civil War. Originally called Second Liberation Army of National Liberation Front of Chad (FROLINAT), and was one of the original groups in rebellion against the regime of François Tombalbaye. But, when in 1971 FROLINAT's new secretary-general Abba Siddick tried to unify all the insurgent forces on the field, the second liberation army under Hissène Habré rebelled and renamed itself in 1972 CCFAN. Composed of the Toubou active in Borkou-Ennedi-Tibesti Prefecture, first under Goukouni Oueddei's command and later under Habré's command. It was in a bitter struggle with the First Liberation Army of the FROLINAT, loyal to Siddick, in the early 1970s. After the rift between Habré and Oueddei in 1976, Habré's followers adopted the name of Forces Armées du Nord (FAN), and Oueddei's followers adopted the name of Forces Armées Populaires (FAP).
