= Opération Bison =

French military operation in Chad from 1969 to 1972

Opération Bison was a French military operation in Chad from 1969 to 1972.

== Background ==
Chad was a former French colony that had become independent in 1960. In 1965 the Chadian Civil War erupted, and a year later the FROLINAT, an insurgent group, was formed to overthrow the Chadian President François Tombalbaye. By 1968 the revolt had extended to most of the country, and the FROLINAT could count on roughly 3000 men.

This forced Tombalbaye to ask in 1968 for help from the French President Charles de Gaulle, counting on the military accords between the two countries. The Defence Accord was signed on August 15, 1960, and the Assistance Militaire Technique (AMT) accord, was signed May 19, 1964. Originally France limited itself to providing logistic support to the Chadian Armed Forces but, when it became clear the situation was not improving, De Gaulle reluctantly started Operation Bison on April 14, 1969, sending 3,000 well-equipped French soldiers against the ragtag FROLINAT forces. Among the conditions for the French help was the acceptance by Tombalbaye of an Administrative Reform Mission (MRA), to reform the army and the civil service and propose radical changes to the government's policies.

The command of the operation was at first given to General Michel Arnaud, a former companion of General Philippe Leclerc. Tombalbaye immediately attempted to dictate the mission of the Operation to him. For example, on one occasion, Tombalbaye summoned Arnauld to a meeting of the Defence Council and ordered him to eliminate all Arabs living at N'Goura, a locality not far from the capital Fort-Lamy, because they didn't deserve to be called Chadians. Arnaud bluntly answered: "I am a French general and will not engage in genocide". A moment of silence followed, after which Tombalbaye ordered the general to take the first flight to France.

Arnaud's replacement in September, General Edouard Cortadellas, got on better with Tombalbaye. The French were militarily successful, constantly defeating the rebels. This, with the reforms of the MRA, contributed to the relative calm of 1970 and 1971, especially in central and eastern Chad, where the French concentrated themselves. By 1971 the rebels were for the most part active only in isolated pockets in the Tibesti, and Cortadellas himself admitted that the Toubou could not be fully subdued, when he said: "I believe we should draw a line below [the Tibesti Region] and leave them to their stones. We can never subdue them."

The French used tactics against the insurgents that emphasized the use of air power for ground support, similarly to what the United States was doing in those years in Vietnam. This helped the French win every engagement with the rebels, and their 20 mm helicopter-mounted cannons were especially useful.

In July 1971 the French ceased direct military involvement, and on August 28, 1972, the operation was officially considered ended, as symbolized by the departure that day of Cortadellas, with most of the troops. Cortadellas' place in Chad was taken by the General J.-H. Auffray, with a single regiment of French Marines stationed in the capital and 600 army advisors, deployed in Chadian uniforms. The operation cost the lives of 50 Frenchmen (among them Cortadellas' son), but failed to destroy the insurgency, which promptly took on new vigor when the French departed.

Auffray remained in command until October 1974, when he was replaced. In 1975 all remaining French were forced to leave Chad, because of a crisis in Franco-Chadian relations generated by the Claustre affaire. French troops returned three years later with Opération Tacaud, again to save the government from the FROLINAT.

== See also ==
- Operation Sparrowhawk
- Tombalbaye government
