= Rose Lokissim =

Chadian soldier

- Born: circa 1955; Chad
- Died: May 15, 1986; Chad
- Cause of death: Execution
- Resting place: Mass grave at the Plain of the Dead
- Occupation: Soldier

Rose Lokissim (born c. 1955 – May 15, 1986) was one of the first female elite soldiers from Chad. She fought against Hissène Habré's dictatorship in the 1980s.

She was arrested by the secret police force known as the Documentation and Security Directorate (DDS) while smuggling documents to give to rebel forces who opposed Habre. She was brought to La Piscine and later transferred to the notorious prison known as Les Locaux. In 1984 she was taken to cell "C". This windowless and putrid room was called the "cell of death" because each day prisoners died there. She was initially put in a men's cell with 60 other men. Then they put her with women for a short time, but then worried about her escaping, returned her to the men's cell. She remained there for eight months. When she returned to the women's cell, she reportedly was extremely dirty, smelled, was covered with lice, and had matted hair. During her time at Les Locaux, she helped smuggle letters of other prisoners out to their families. She was tortured and ultimately executed.

Documents recovered from abandoned DDS offices provided information about her last interrogation held on May 15, 1986. Her captors said that Lokissim stated that "even if she dies in prison, she doesn't regret it, because Chad will thank her and history will talk about her". She was executed that day. She was 33 years old at the time.

Lokissim is the subject of the 2015 documentary film titled Talking about Rose, directed by Isabel Coixet.

== Early life ==
Rose Lokissim grew up in a polygamous household in a small village in Chad. Rose was described as a passionate and peaceful person who didn't let her age or gender get in the way of her taking charge when needed in any given situation. One of her family members recounted a time in 1967 where Rose's father would only listen to her during a terrible fight with one of his wives.

== Fighting against Hissène Habré ==
Lokissim became one of Chad's first elite soldiers in the late 1970s. In 1984 Rose joined the opposition. Rose and others were arrested on September 14, 1984 by the DDS. Rose was first taken to La Piscine. This prison was a swimming pool initially. She spent the remainder of her life at Les Locaux. Rose spent time in both the women's and men's cell. One survivor that served time with Lokissim stated that Rose helped her deliver her baby. Rose also documented the conditions in the prison. On 15 May 1986, Habré became aware of Rose's actions and continued political defiance and ordered her execution.

== See also ==
- Souleymane Guengueng
- Jacqueline Moudeina
