= Lol Mahamat Choua =

President of Chad in 1979

- لول محمد شوا

3rd President of Chad
- In office 29 April 1979 – 3 September 1979
- Vice President: Negué Djogo
- Preceded by: Goukouni Oueddei
- Succeeded by: Goukouni Oueddei

Personal details
- Born: 15 June 1939 Mao, French Equatorial Africa (present-day Chad)
- Died: 15 September 2019 (aged 80) N'Djamena, Republic of Chad
- Party: Rally for Democracy and Progress
- Other political affiliations: Popular Movement for the Liberation of Chad

Lol Mahamat Choua (Arabic: لول محمد شوا; 15 June 1939 – 15 September 2019) was a Chadian politician who served as his country's head of state for four months in 1979. He was the President of the Rally for Democracy and Progress (RDP) political party.

An adherent of Islam and a member of the Kanembu ethnic group, Choua came into power during the First Chadian Civil War. The Popular Movement for the Liberation of Chad (MPLT), a Kanembu rebel group backed by Nigeria, along with the central government, the Armed Forces of the North (FAN) and the People's Armed Forces (FAP) were the main combatants. When a peace conference was organized in Kano, Nigeria, the MPLT, which suffered from a lack of members, chose Lol to head its delegation to meeting.

Under Nigerian pressure, Lol was made head of the Transitional Government of National Unity (Gouvernement d'Union Nationale de Transition or GUNT) on 29 April 1979 by the four factions present at Kano I. The GUNT included 21 ministers, of whom 11 were northerners and 10 were southerners. Goukouni Oueddei, head of the FAP, became Interior Minister, Hissène Habré became Defence Minister, and Wadel Abdelkader Kamougué, leader of the Chadian Armed Forces (FAT), became vice-president. But the transitional government excluded all the pro-Libyan forces; as a result, a rival government, backed by Muammar al-Gaddafi, was formed; it was called the Democratic Revolutionary Council, and it was headed by Ahmat Acyl, an Arab.

The problem of the rival government, and the transitional government's resistance to Nigerian influence, led to two new peace conferences, this time in Lagos, Nigeria. On 21 August an agreement between all factions, those of the CDR included, was signed; it became known as the Lagos Accord. The accord brought to the replacement of Choua with Goukouni as head of the transitional government, an act that was accomplished on 3 September.

Choua served as minister of transport in Habré's government, starting in 1982 to 1985, after returning from exile in Paris since 1979. Idriss Déby overthrew Habré in 1990, and when he legalized opposition parties in 1992, one of them was Choua's Rally for Democracy and Progress (RDP), based mainly in Kanem Region. From 15 January 1993 to 7 April 1993 the Sovereign National Conference, which initiated the transition to multiparty elections, was held. Among the decisions of the conference was to form a transitional legislative body, the Higher Transitional Council (Conseil supérieur de la transition, or CST), composed of 57 members, which had Choua as its president. Choua served as President of the CST until he came into conflict with Déby, and as a result the CST replaced him with Mahamat Bachir, a loyalist of Déby's Patriotic Salvation Movement (MPS), on 15 October 1994.

In June 1996, the first multiparty presidential election in Chad's history were held. Choua placed fifth, taking 5.93% of the vote, while Déby won in the second round, held in July. He was elected to the National Assembly as an RDP candidate in the first round of the 1997 parliamentary election.

In the 2001 presidential election, the RDP supported Déby, and the party, in alliance with Déby's Patriotic Salvation Movement (MPS), won 12 seats (out of 155) in the April 2002 parliamentary election. Choua himself was re-elected to the National Assembly as an RDP candidate from Mao constituency in Kanem Department. Choua is the President of the RDP Parliamentary Group in the National Assembly. In 2005, during the constitutional referendum on the elimination of presidential term limits, Choua and his party boycotted the vote.

Following an August 2007 agreement between political parties on preparations for a new parliamentary election in 2009, Choua headed a committee overseeing the implementation of the agreement.

According to the RDP, on 3 February 2008, during a battle between government forces and rebels for control of N'Djamena, Choua was arrested by members of the presidential guard, who "acted with incredible brutality", and taken away in the back of a truck. Following international expressions of concern regarding the fate of Choua and two other opposition politicians (Ibni Oumar Mahamat Saleh and Ngarlejy Yorongar) who were also reportedly arrested, Interior Minister Ahmat Mahamat Bachir said on 14 February that Choua had been "found" and that he was still alive. Also on 14 February the French Ministry of Foreign Affairs said that the French ambassador to Chad had been allowed to visit Choua, who was being held in a military prison. On 16 February Minister of Communications, Hourmadji Moussa Doumgor, said that Choua was being held with prisoners of war. Foreign Minister Ahmad Allam-Mi said on 22 February that Choua had been found working with the rebels in flagrant délit and was being held for investigation. The RDP sharply denounced this claim.

On 26 February the government announced that Choua was being placed under house arrest.

Political offices
Preceded by Goukouni Oueddei	Head of State of Chad; 1979	Succeeded by Goukouni Oueddei
