= Michel Arnaud =

French hero of the Liberation of France during World War II (1915–1990)

- Born: 17 November 1915; Bourg-en-Bresse, France
- Died: 1 August 1990 (aged 74); Fréjus, France
- Military career
- Allegiance: France
- Branch: French Army
- Rank: Général de corps d'armée
- Conflicts: World War II; First Indochina War

Michel Arnaud (17 November 1915 – 1 August 1990) was a French Army general who distinguished himself in World War II, and for this was decorated with the Ordre de la Libération and made Grand Officier de la Légion d'honneur.

== Biography ==
Son of a pharmacist, Arnaud was born on November 17, 1915, in Bourg-en-Bresse. After studying in Dijon in the Lyceum Carnot, he opted for the military career and went in 1935 to the École Spéciale Militaire de Saint-Cyr, the foremost French military academy.

Arnaud had chosen to enter in the colonial infantry, and when Charles de Gaulle issued the Appeal of June 18 in 1940 for resistance against the Axis, he was a lieutenant stationed at Faya-Largeau in Chad and attached to the Régiment de Tirailleurs Sénégalais du Tchad (RTST), and on 26 August sided with de Gaulle, like all soldiers of the RTST.

He participated to Philippe Leclerc's offensive against Italian positions in Libya, but was badly wounded near Kufra on 8 February 1941, and sent to hospital first at Yaoundé and then at Beirut. In January 1942 he entered in the staff of General Georges Catroux, head of the Free French Forces in the Middle East, and was promoted Captain in June.

In 1943 he was again put under the orders of Leclerc, and under his command was to remain till the end of the war. For his old wound till 1 December 1944; having after asked to return to field duty, he was assigned to the Régiment du March de Tchad (RMT), the new name of the RTST.

After 1945, Arnaud took part to the First Indochina War, and in the 1960s was promoted first Colonel and then Brigade General. In 1969 Arnaud returned to Chad as commander of Opération Bison, a military operation that had to contain the menace represented to the Chadian government by the FROLINAT rebels; but tensions with the Chadian President brought to his replacement just a few months after his arrival.

After that, Arnaud held several other positions, until he was made Corps General in 1974. He died on 1 August 1990 at Frejus, and is buried at Grenoble.

== Decorations ==
- Grand Officer of the Légion d'honneur
- Companion of the Liberation (7 July 1945)
- Croix de guerre 1939-1945 (3 citations)
- Croix de guerre des Théatres d'Opérations Exterieures (2 citations)
- Croix de la Valeur Militaire
- Médaille coloniale with "Koufra" clasp
- Insigne des blessés militaires
- Officer of the Order of the Black Star (Benin)
