= Opération Tacaud =

1978–80 French operation in Chad

- Part of Chadian-Libyan conflict
Date	20 February 1978 – May 1980
Location	N'Djamena, Chad

Belligerents
France; Chad	FROLINAT

Commanders and leaders
(France) "Forest"	Goukouni Oueddei

Opération Tacaud was a French military operation in Chad, that took place between 20 February 1978 and May 1980. Its aim was to support the Chadian army in protecting N'Djamena from the FROLINAT.

== History ==
Opération Tacaud was triggered by the capture of Faya-Largeau by the FROLINAT on 17 February 1978, opening the road to N'Djamena, capital of Chad. France decided to send in troops to support the Chadian army, as had been previously done with Opération Bison a few years before.

=== Order of battle ===
Intervention was carried out by entirely professional units of the French Army, belonging to the 9th Marine Infantry Brigade.

The 3rd RIMa was sent in its entirety, along with

- a battery of the 11th RAMa,
- a squadron of the RIMC
- a squadron of the 1st REC
- two companies of the 2nd REP
- one motorised company of the 1st RE

The Navy offered one Breguet Atlantic plane for intelligence gathering, as well as naval commandos who were deployed at N'Djamena International Airport.

The Air Force offered eight SEPECAT Jaguar attack planes and a number of Transall aircraft for transport.

Furthermore, two units of the 11th Parachute Division, the 2nd REP and the 35th RAP, were put in alert for possible deployment.

=== Deployment ===
The French Army already had men deployed in Chad, as personnel of the Marine Infantry were present for military counselling to the Chadian Army.

On 20 April, these troops received reinforcements with the first company of the 1st REC, equipped with Panhard AML armoured cars; one command platoon; and one mechanised platoon under captain Yvanoff. The 2nd squadron of the RIMC followed shortly thereafter.

=== Operations ===
The first clashes occurred in Salal, where the French routed a FROLINAT group.

On 18 and 19 May, the Chadian 1st Infantry regiment had to rescue Chadian gendarmes surrounded by rebels in Ati. A squadron of the 1er REC tried to join the fight from Mussoro, but was unable to reach the battle. The 3rd company of the 3rd RIMa also joined in, from Mongo; as they approached Ati, the marsouins found themselves under heavy fire and had to call in air support, provided by the Jaguars.

On 19, reinforcements of the REC arrived. The next day, the Jaguars softened FROLINAT positions, which were them stormed and taken. The rebels disengaged and regrouped in Jeddah, 45 km North of Ati, from where they threatened the town.

The French decided to raid the rebels in Jeddah to prevent another attack on Ati. On 31 May, two companies of the 3rd RIMa and a squadron of the 1st REC, supported by a battery of the 11th RAMa and the Jaguars, stormed the city. FROLINAT opened fire with small arm and Strela 2 fire, managing to shoot down one of the Jaguars with machine gun fire. Fighting lasted for 6 hours before the FROLINAT was routed.

After the battle of Jeddah, it took then months for the FROLINAT to reconstitute a fighting force capable of attacking a town. On 5 March 1979, it attacked and occupied Abéché. The 3rd RIMa, the RIMC and the 11th RAMa had to intervene again.

== Results ==
Opération Tacaud lost 18 killed and two downed Jaguars to the French. Professional units rotated in Chad until May 1980.

The experience gathered during the operation started the trend of professionalisation of the Army.
