= Battle of Choua =

Choua raid
- Part of Boko Haram insurgency
Date	May 27, 2015
Location	Choua, Lake Chad

Belligerents
Chad	Islamic State - West Africa Province

Casualties and losses
4 killed 4 injured	33 killed

On May 27, 2015, militants from the Islamic State – West Africa Province attacked Chadian forces on the island of Choua, but were repulsed.

== Background ==
Throughout Boko Haram's rampage in Nigeria's Borno State and northern Cameroon in 2014 and early 2015, Chad had managed to stay relatively insulated from any Boko Haram attacks on their soil. In January 2015, Chad deployed thousands of soldiers to northern Cameroon to aid the Cameroonian government in repelling Boko Haram attacks coming from the Nigerian border. Chadian troops were key in defending the Cameroonian city of Bodo from an attack on January 30, and recaptured the Nigerian city of Gamboru Ngala a few days later. On February 13, Boko Haram attacked Chadian territory for the first time at Ngouboua, leaving 27 jihadists and four civilians dead. On March 7, Boko Haram pledged allegiance to the Islamic State and became it's West Africa Province.

== Battle ==
The militants attacked the Chadian base at Choua island, located along the Nigerien, Nigerian, and Cameroonian borders, on May 27. Little is known about the battle outside of what Chadian officials stated. On May 29, Chadian military spokesman Azem Bermandoa said that 33 jihadists were killed, along with four Chadian soldiers killed and four injured. It's unclear if any ISWAP militants were able to retreat or if they were all killed.
