= Khalié Brahim Djadarab =

Djadarab
- Born: early 1940s Arada, Chad
- Occupations: Teacher, politician, entrepreneur
- Years active: 1960s–1990s
- Known for: Women's political mobilization in Chad
- Political party: Patriotic Salvation Movement (MPS)
- Spouse(s): Rakis Moll (divorced); Félix Malloum (divorced)
- Children: 1

Khalié Brahim Djadarab or Khalié Madeleine (born c. 1940) is a Chadian political activist.

== Life ==
Djadarab was born in the early 1940s in Arada, Chad. She attended the town's first public school after it opened in 1953, and (though she later opposed the practice) underwent FGM. In 1954 her father was transferred to Abéché, where she finished he primary studies. She did not have the opportunity to attend secondary school. Aged seventeen or eighteen, her marriage was arranged to her former teacher Rakis Moll. Moll persuaded Djadarab to become a teacher. Though she felt she was not properly prepared, she set up a girls' school in Abéché.

In 1966 she divorced her first husband and married the military officer Félix Malloum. They lived together for three years, but he was increasingly away from home involved in military or political campaigns. In 1975 Malloum seized power in a coup, but the couple's marriage did not survive much longer. Malloum took custody of their son, and married again.

Djadarab returned to teaching. After teachers' salaries dropped in the late 1970s, she earned a living by setting up a drinking establishment. She stayed in Chad after Malloum fled to Nigeria in 1979.

After Idriss Déby overthrew Hissène Habré's regime in 1990, Djadarab entered politics as a member of the Patriotic Salvation Movement (MPS). Initially a strong supporter of Deby, Djadarab recruited women to join the MPS, and became the leader of the MPS women's section in N'Djamena. However, she became disillusioned after seeing few women actually offered leadership positions in Chad.
