= Truth Commission (Chad) =

Presidential investigation in Chad

The Commission of Inquiry into the Crimes and Misappropriations Committed by Ex-President Habré, His Accomplices and/or Accessories (French: Commission d'Enquête du Ministère Chadien de la Justice sur les Crimes du Régime de Hissène Habré) was established on December 29, 1990, by the President of Chad, Idriss Déby. Its goal was to investigate the "illegal detentions, assassinations, disappearances, torture, mistreatment, other attacks on the physical and mental integrity of persons; plus all violations of human rights, illicit narcotics trafficking and embezzlement of state funds between 1982 and 1990", when former President Hissène Habré was in power.

It reported on May 7, 1992, describing approximately 40,000 killings and 200,000 cases of torture committed by Habré’s DDS (Directorate of Documentation and Security), and detailing the involvement of foreign governments in the funding and training of the DDS. The commission published the names and photographs of the worst perpetrators, and its work has been widely used by victims’ families trying to seek justice. Its recommendations were however largely ignored by President Déby’s regime.

== Background ==
African's fifth largest country, Chad, is a poor country suffering from inadequate structure and internal conflict. Its post-independence history has seen instability and violence, most of which was due to tensions between the mainly Arab-Muslim North and the predominantly Christian and animist South. In 1982, Hissène Habré, then defense minister, captured the capital, N'Djamena, and ousted the northerner President, Goukouki Oueddei. Habré began a programme of widespread repression including torture and killings, until he was himself overthrown by one of his former generals, the Libyan-backed Idriss Deby, in December 1990.

== The Commission's Work ==
=== Formation and Mandate ===
One month after coming to power, the new president established by presidential decree "The Commission of Inquiry into the Crimes and Misappropriations Committed by Ex-President Habré, His Accomplices and/or Accessories". Its legitimacy came from the president himself, who gave the commission a broad mandate: "investigate the illegal imprisonments, detentions, assassinations, disappearances, tortures and practices of acts of barbarity, the mistreatment, the other attacks on the physical or mental integrity of persons, and all violations of human rights and illicit trafficking in narcotics", but also "audit the financial operations and bank accounts of the ex-president, his accomplices and/or accessories", as there were allegations of corruption and embezzlement. In order to fulfill this large mandate, the commission was given the right to investigate, collect documentation, take testimonies, confiscate material and "summon any natural or legal person in a position to assist it in the investigation".

The commission was originally made up of 12 members:

- President: Mahamat Hassane Abakar, first deputy prosecutor
- 1st Vice-president: Ali Abdoulaye, director of Police Security Branch
- 2nd Vice-president: Isseine Djibrine, principal police superintendent
- Beassoum Ben N'Gassoro, magistrate
- Dimanche Beramgoto, director of research in the Commissariat of the Interior and Security
- Bemba Jonas, police officer
- Wadar Moudalbaye, administrative officer in the sub-directorate of external finance
- Sam Manang, military police warrant officer
- Ousmane Mahamat, records clerk
- Naindo Dalroh, records clerk
- Secretaries : Madjitoloum Ngardedji, police secretary
- Koh Djabou, magistrate's clerk

=== Difficulties ===
Despite the huge task it had to undertake, the commission was given limited resources. This led to numerous practical problems: for example, when starting their job, the commissioners were supplied with only two cars, neither of which was suited to travel to Chad's desert regions. Because of that, they were not able to investigate personally in the provinces and outside of the capital.

Even their work inside of N’Djamena was impeded. Indeed, there was not enough office space available for the commission in the city. As a result, they had to use the former secret detention centre of the security forces, a place where many had been tortured and killed, as their headquarters. Many victims and potential witnesses were effectively scared of going back to that place and thus did not give testimonies the commission could have used.

Commissioners were also regularly threatened by former DDS personnel, scaring some of them away from doing their job, to the extent that three quarters of them had to be replaced after six months.

== Findings and Recommendations ==
Even though the commission faced many challenges, it managed to produce and publish in May 1992 a detailed report. It pointed to a minimum of 40,000 people killed and 200,000 cases of torture carried out by the security services, with the personal involvement of former President Hissène Habré. It revealed both the names and the photographs of the perpetrators, which had never been done by a Truth Commission before. In addition, it accused Habré and his ethnic community, the Goranana, of genocide against the Zaghawa community.

It also uncovered the fact that the United States was directly involved in the abuses, providing training to the DDS personnel, on American soil as well as in N’Djamena. Moreover, a US official worked with the DDS in their headquarters, where people were being tortured and killed. The report indicates as well that the US, along with France, Zaire and Egypt, contributed to the DDS budget.

To avoid further abuses, the commission made several recommendations to the new government:

- Set up an independent judiciary
- Reform the security forces
- Create a national Human Rights Commission
- Prosecute the perpetrators, including Habré, in a lawful manner
- Give symbolic reparations to victims

== Notable perpetrators ==
- Saleh Younous and sentenced to life in Chad for complicity in the Habré regime in Chad for complicity in the Habré regime
- Mahamat Djibrine

== Impact ==
=== National Impact ===
Idriss Déby, who ordered the commission, did not follow up on its recommendations and alluded to a lack of resources to stop the publication of the report. Because of that and the fact that there were no public hearings, few Chadians have been aware of the commission's work. Meanwhile, human rights abuses continued under Déby's rule, and he even integrated into his government, as high officials, about 40 well-known perpetrators identified by the commission. Therefore, it seems his real goal in setting up the commission was only to show Habré as a criminal, to improve his own image and legitimize his rule.

=== International Impact ===
Nonetheless, the report having been leaked via a French publishing house, its findings have been known and used outside of Chad by victims seeking justice. Human rights advocates have used it in their attempts to put Habré on trial, since it helped them find witnesses. In September 2005, Hissène Habré was imprisoned in his Senegalese villa. His trial opened on July 20, 2015, in Dakar.
