= Choua =

Choua is a surname. Notable people with the surname include:

- Lol Mahamat Choua (1939–2019), Chadian politician
- Mohamed Choua (born 1992), Moroccan basketball player
