= Saadie Goukouni Weddeye =

Chadian activist (born 1980)

- Born: 1980 (age 45–46); Lagos
- Parent: Goukouni Oueddei

Saadie Goukouni Weddeye (born 1980) is a Chadian activist. Her father, Goukouni Oueddei, was Chad's head of state in the early 1980s. She was appointed to the government as Minister of Social Action in 2013.

== Biography ==
Weddeye was born in Lagos in Nigeria in 1980. She was the daughter of Goukouni Oueddei, who was head of state of Chad at the time, and was the youngest of twelve children. After her father was ousted from power in 1982, she became a "child of exile". At first, she moved to Tripoli, Libya. In 1996, she moved to France. In Tours, she became very involved in community life, including Catholic Relief Services, and she earned a master's degree in corporate law. She compared her father's legacy to a compass for herself.

Despite her years abroad, Weddeye had ideas of returning to Africa. In 2011, Weddeye returned to N'Djamena, Chad, and worked as the legal adviser to the National Agency of Investment and Export. On 26 January 2013 she was appointed to the government as Minister of Social Action, Family and National Solidarity in a cabinet reshuffle. It was a surprise to her, and she learned of her cabinet post through national television. Weddeye said she wanted to be judged on her results and did not seek power for itself. "This is a priceless opportunity, but I want above all to prove myself," she said of her appointment.

However, on 23 April 2013 she was recalled as Minister of Social Action. No reason was given for her dismissal. It was believed that the First Lady of Chad, Hinda Deby, harbored some jealousy toward Weddeye. MACT Chad opined that the First Lady's feelings toward Weddeye were misplaced.

== Personal life ==
She is a Muslim and is the mother of two children. She hoped that her appointment would inspire other Chadian women to enter politics. Weddeye intends to work on humanitarian issues one day.
