= Extraordinary African Chambers =

International tribunal

- Chambres Africaines Extraordinaires
- Established: 8 February 2013
- Jurisdiction: Senegal
- Location: Dakar, Senegal
- Composition method: Appointment by government of Senegal and African Union
- Authorised by: Statute
- Website: http://www.chambresafricaines.org/

The Extraordinary African Chambers (French: Chambres Africaines Extraordinaires, CAE) was a tribunal established under an agreement between the African Union and Senegal to try international crimes committed in Chad from 7 June 1982 to 1 December 1990. This period corresponds to the regime of former Chadian President Hissène Habré. The Extraordinary African Chambers were opened 8 February 2013 in Dakar, Senegal. The magistrate Ciré Aly Bâ is the current administrator of the Extraordinary African Chambers in the Senegalese courts.
