= Djidingar Dono Ngardoum =

Prime Minister of Chad (1928–2000)

2nd Prime Minister of Chad
- In office May 19, 1982 – June 19, 1982
- President: Goukouni Oueddei; Hissène Habré
- Preceded by: Vacant
- Succeeded by: Jean Alingué Bawoyeu

Personal details
- Born: 1928 French Chad
- Died: February 19, 2000 (aged 71–72) Chad

Djidingar Dono Ngardoum (1928 – February 19, 2000) was the Prime Minister of Chad from May 19, 1982 to June 19, 1982. He was minister of finance until 1965.
