= FROLINAT =

Rebel group in Chad in 1966–1993

National Liberation Front of Chad
- جبهة التحرير الوطنية تشاد
- Flag of the National Liberation Front of Chad
- Leaders: Ibrahim Abatcha †; Abba Siddick; Hissène Habré; Goukouni Oueddei
- Dates active: 19 June 1966 – 14 January 1993 (26 years, 209 days)
- Headquarters: Tripoli
- Active regions: Chad; Libya
- Ideology: Marxism–Leninism (until 1968); Islamic socialism Direct democracy Nationalism; Progressivism; Anti-Zionism; Faction: Maoism
- Political position: Left-wing
- Size: 500–3,000
- Wars: the Chadian Civil War (1965–1979)

FROLINAT (French: Front de libération nationale du Tchad; English: National Liberation Front of Chad) was an insurgent rebel group active in Chad between 1966 and 1993.

== History ==
=== Origins ===
The organization was the result of the political union between the leftist Chadian National Union (UNT), led by Ibrahim Abatcha, and the General Union of the Sons of Chad (Union Générale des Fils du Tchad or UGFT), led by Ahmed Hassan Musa. An Islamist, Musa was close to the Muslim Brotherhood. The UGFT remained autonomous within the new group under the banner of the Liberation Front of Chad (FLT). The union and group flag was agreed upon at the Nyala Congress in Sudan between June 19 and June 22, 1966.

Abatcha was proclaimed Secretary-General, while another cadre of the UNT, Abou Bakar Djalabou, was designated to lead the delegation that would represent the movement abroad. A committee was also selected at the congress, composed of thirty members taken equally from the UNT and the FLT. The front was composed exclusively by Muslim northerners, and there was to be no attempt to create a link to the southern expatriates in the Central African Republic.

The movement's official program, also approved at the Nyala congress, proclaimed the rejection of secession, confessional politics, and ethnic discrimination, and stated that neocolonialism should be fought in order to "regain the total national independence of our fatherland". A coalition government, national and democratic, was to be formed, and all political prisoners freed. All foreign troops were to leave, and support was to be given to national liberation movements, and a foreign policy of positive neutrality sought. The economic objectives were quite vague: wages would be raised, arbitrary taxes abolished, and the land given to the tillers. In conclusion, "The document was so vague and so general, it could have been written for any country under the sun."

As the FROLINAT was originally composed of few members, it relied on the fact that the Chadian state was already in disarray; the southern-dominated government despised and bypassed Muslim traditional leaders, and already in 1963, the most important northern politicians had been arrested, and all important positions in the Chadian Armed Forces and in the local governments were held by non-Muslim southerners. To cite Sam Nolutschungu, "Everyone knew that the regime was corrupt, cruel, arbitrary, and absurd."

This discontent already existed in November 1965 after the bloody Mangalmé riots and gave way to a number of loosely-knitted peasant revolts in central and eastern Chad, that rapidly spread from Mangalmé and nearby Batha Prefecture to Ouaddaï and Salamat prefectures, where in February 1967 the prefect and his deputy were killed.

In the BET Prefecture of northern Chad, by 1965 unrest had started expanding. So when Abatcha, with seven North Korean trained companions, penetrated Eastern Chad in November 1966, he could count on a territory that was already in full revolt.

Musa and the most conservative elements of the FLT pulled out of the FROLINAT at the end on 1966, but a dualism was always present between the socialist, anti-imperialist, even Pan-African UNT element and the more conservative and regionalist UGFT tradition. Another element of division consisted in the dualism between the two original areas of the rebellion, Kanem and the East: Kanem mainly attracted support from Chadians who lived in Egypt and the Central African Republic, the east mainly from Sudan.

The combined forces of the two groups began in the same year to operate in the mid-east of the country, under the direct command of Abatcha. Shortly after, in March 1968, a lieutenant of Abatcha, Mohammed Taher, instigated a mutiny by the Daza Toubou of the National and Nomadic Guard (GNN) of Aouzou, which was evacuated by the national army in September. Taher had already recruited militants among the Teda Toubou in the Borkou, and shortly after the Aozou mutiny obtained the support of Goukouni Oueddei, an influential figure among the Teda of the Tibesti and son of the derde of the Toubou, Oueddei Kichidemi. This extended the insurgency to the north and the Toubou nomads, adding a new element of complexity to the rebellion and bringing support to the movement from Chadians living in Libya, and especially students at the Islamic University of Bayda.

=== Dissensions ===
On February 11, 1968, Abatcha was killed in combat and a battle for succession ensued, in which two candidates were assassinated and a third was forced to escape to Sudan. In the end, Abba Sidick emerged victorious. A moderate left-wing intellectual and a former minister under François Tombalbaye, he became the new 1970 secretary-general of FROLINAT, and established the headquarters of the organization in Tripoli.

Abatcha's death did not make the situation easier for the government, nor did the formation in 1969 of two separate FROLINAT armies. The First Liberation Army of the FROLINAT, la Première Armée, a loose coalition of warlords active mainly in central Chad, engaged in hit-and-run tactics, a faction-ridden force whose groups often fought among themselves and engaged in banditry. The Second Liberation Army, la Deuxième Armée, which operated in the north, and was composed mainly by Toubou. After the death of Mohammed Taher in 1969 the Second Army came under the control of Goukouni Oueddei.

These divisions did not much help the Chadian government; Tombalbaye's authority in the central and northern parts of the country was limited to a patchwork of urban centers, often connected only by air. This forced the Chadian president to ask in 1968 for French intervention, on the grounds of military accords between the two countries. French President Charles de Gaulle accepted in 1969, and military intervention began on April 14 with Opération Bison.

When Siddick made it in 1971, a call for the union of the different groups he was opposed by Goukouni Oueddei and Hissène Habré, who commanded the Second Liberation Army of the FROLINAT, renamed Command Council of the Armed Forces of the North (Conseil de Commandement des Forces Armeés du Nord or CCFAN) in February 1972. Only the first army of the FROLINAT, operating in eastern and centre-eastern Chad, remained loyal to Siddick. Another armed faction that emerged was the Volcan Army, built by Muhammad Baghlani, a FROLINAT group with an Islamist tendency.

In 1969, Chadian President, François Tombalbaye, appealed to France for help. As a result, a French mission arrived with ample powers to reform the army and the civil service and to recommend the abolition of unpopular laws and taxes. Also following their recommendations, the judicial powers of traditional Muslim rulers were restored. Another conciliatory move was the liberation in 1971 of many political prisoners and the formation of a more balanced government, including many more northerners than before. The result of these moves was positive; the insurgents were confined to the Tibesti and the French started retiring their troops, which had played a key role in the years 1969–1971. Certain to have defeated the FROLINAT, Tombalbaye left the reforms in the summer of 1971 and accused some of the recently freed political prisoners of having attempted a coup d'état with the help of Libya. In reaction, Libyan president Muammar al-Gaddafi officially recognized Abba Siddick's FROLINAT, offering him economic and logistic support. The Libyans then began to occupy the Aouzou strip.

The manifestations of student rioting in November 1971 caused the destitution of the Chadian Chief of Staff, general Jacques Doumro; his position was occupied by colonel Félix Malloum. In 1972, Tombalbaye jailed hundreds of political opponents and to block his enemies initiated a policy of gestures towards Libya and France. Libya reduced its support for Siddick and infighting exploded between the first army of the FROLINAT and Habré's FAN. The first army won assuming control of Ennedi, while the FAN retired to the Borkou and Tibesti. The kidnapping at Bardaï of a French archaeologist, Françoise Claustre, by Habré's forces clouded the relations of the latter with France (April 1974).

In June 1973, Tombalbaye jailed his Chief of Staff General Malloum. A political opponent, the liberal Outel Bono, was on the verge of forming a new political party when he was assassinated in Paris and Tombalbaye was accused of the crime. The president lost support within his party, the Chadian Progressive Party (PPT), causing Tombalbaye to replace it with a new one, the National Movement for the Cultural and Social Revolution (MNRCS), and to start an Africanization campaign. The colonial names of some cities were changed with autochthonous names: Fort-Lamy became N'Djamena, Fort-Archambault became Sarh, among others. He himself changed his name from François to Ngarta. An element of this Africanization was the introduction of yondo initiation rites proper of the Sara (his ethnic group) for all those who wanted to obtain positions in the civil service and the army, rites that were seen as anti-Christian. This, with forced "voluntary" mobilization of the population in agricultural campaigns, mined his support in the south. He also lost the support of the army by arresting many young officers whom he accused of planning a coup: as a result, Tombalbaye was killed and overthrown by a coup on April 13, 1975. He was succeeded by Félix Malloum as head of the Supreme Military Council (CSM). The new government included many northerners, but southerners retained a majority. Notwithstanding some popular measures, the government could not satisfy the people's demands. The capital saw new student strikes and the trade unions were suspended. In April 1976, there was an unsuccessful attempt to kill Malloum, and in March 1977, a mutiny by units army in the capital was suppressed by the execution of its ringleaders.

After the death of Tombalbaye, FROLINAT had continued its dismemberment. A group active in the east, the FLT, entered in the new government of N'Djamena in July. Oueddei Kichidemi returned from his exile in Libya in the summer of 1975; his son Goukouni Oueddei remained there instead. Habré and Goukouni had formed the CCFAN with the design to unite all the northern elements of the FROLINAT under their banner, but now the situation was heavily embroiled by the affair Claustre, which brought France to negotiate directly with the rebels and not sustain Tombalbaye's successor, Malloum, who reacted by asking the 1,500 French troops in Chad to leave the country.

=== Goukouni vs. Habré ===
In 1976 and 1977, Libya supported active to the FROLINAT. Faya-Largeau was besieged twice in 1976 and Bardaï was conquered in June 1977 by Habré. The question of Libyan support caused a rupture between Goukouni and Habré, both Toubous but of traditionally opposed clans, whom circumstances had made allies in 1971. Habré opposed the Libyan plans of annexation of the Aouzou Strip, while Goukouni was against the Claustre kidnapping. In 1976, Habré, commanding only a minority of the CCFAN, broke away from the main organization with a few hundred followers and assumed his headquarters in the Batha and Biltine prefectures, founding the Armed Forces of the North (FAN). Goukouni, along with the rest of the forces, kept the name CCFAN and gave the hostages to the French in January 1977.

In September 1977, Habré started negotiating an alliance with the Malloum and the Military Supreme Council for the formation of a national unity government, that was created in August 1978 with Malloum as president and Habré as Prime minister. At the same time Goukouni consolidated his positions in the north, united most of the insurgent formations, including the first army of the FROLINAT and the majority of the CCFAN. All these formations united under the banner of the newly formed People's Armed Forces (FAP), led by Goukouni, who conquered Faya-Largeau in February 1979, assuming control of half the Chadian territory. His advance towards the capital seemed unstoppable, and only the intervention of the French army made it possible to block him at Ati, less than 300 miles north of N'Djamena.

In 1979, the national unity government was finished. Habré and Malloum confronted each other in the capital and in February Habré was left in control, while Chadian Armed Forces (FAT) retired itself towards the south. Shortly before, another FROLINAT group had been formed in January 1978 as the Third Liberation Army of the FROLINAT (later called Popular Movement for the Liberation of Chad, or MPLT), led by Aboubakar Abdel Rahmane, once an ally of Goukouni; this group defeated the government's forces in the west. The First Liberation Army of the FROLINAT reassumed its autonomy, taking control of the eastern prefectures of Ouaddaï and Biltine. In the south the Chadian Armed Forces, the former national army, was reorganized by the lieutenant Wadel Abdelkader Kamougué, former head of Malloum's gendarmerie, who established in May 1979 the south of the country a government called Permanent Committee. Goukouni took advantage of such a chaotic situation and appeared in N'Djamena before Habré had obtained complete control, and took the capital.

=== The GUNT and its failure ===
International moves were made to put an end to the civil war. Nigeria held a reconciliation conference at Kano in March 1979. New parties with little or no roots in Chad were formed for this conference, like the Popular Front for the Liberation of Chad (FPLT), headed by Awad Muktar Nasser, a force sustained by Sudan; or the South Front, founded in April 1979, a Muslim group composed of a few dozens of fighters commanded by the Sudanese police sergeant (of Chadian origin) Hadjaro al-Senousi, who boasted to lead an "original FROLINAT", and to have no less than 3,000 men ready in Sudan. Similar to these was in Sudan a so-called "Government in exile of the Islamic republic of Chad".

But only four forces were at the end invited at Kano I: these were the FAN, the FAP, Malloum for the national government, and the small MPLT, supported by Nigeria. On the basis of the Kano Accord a national unity government was formed on April 29, 1979, with Goukouni as interior minister, Habré at the Defence, the general Negue Djogo vice-president (who represented the south, but had broken with Kamougué). The president was Lol Mahamat Choua, a protégé of Habré recommended by Nigeria. Libya protested against these arrangements because they excluded Ahmat Acyl, who had succeeded Baghlani as commander of the Volcan Army after the death of the latter in a flight accident. As a result, Acyl and other pro-Libyan elements formed the Front for Joint Provisional Action (Front d'Action Commune Provisoire or FACP) to oppose the new government (it was renamed a month later Revolutionary Democratic Council). Weeks later, to settle these dissensions, another peace conference was celebrated May in the Nigerian city of Lagos. In summer, yet a new government was formed, the Transitional Government of National Unity (GUNT), after a third conference held in July at Lagos which proclaimed Goukouni president, Kamougué vice-president and Habré Defence minister. As a result, by September the French troops had left almost completely the country.

But the cohesion of the GUNT did not much survive their departure: on March 22, 1980, the Second Battle of N'Djamena exploded among Goukouni and Habré's forces. A few ceasefire were negotiated, but none resisted. In the meanwhile, other warlords entered in the fray: Kamougué sided with Goukouni, Acyl with Habré, leaving the city divided in two with the northern part kept by Goukouni and the southern by Habré, who lost now the Defence ministry. The fighting extended to other parts of the country. The forces of Goukouni took Faya-Largeau and cut Habré's supply lines with Sudan. On June 15, 1980, Chad and Libya signed a treaty of mutual defence. In virtue of this agreement the forces of Kamougué and Goukouni received tanks, airplanes and other materials, and crushed the forces of Habré who fled to Cameroon while his men in the capital and the east of the country were disarmed.

In 1981, the governments of Chad and Libya announced their intention to form a single country. But French increasing support for Goukouni prepared what happened on October 29, 1981, when the GUNT's president asked Libyan troops to leave the country. A multi-national contingent of African peace-keepers was to be sent, but only small Nigerian, Senegalese and Zairian forces arrived. Libya's president, Qaddafi, accepted to retire Libyan soldiers in exchange for being chosen for the presidency of the Organisation of African Unity (OUA), and a year was fixed for completing the withdrawal of all the Libyans from Chad.

=== Habré ascends to power ===
Meanwhile, Habré was reorganizing his forces in the east with Sudanese help, and had begun campaigning, taking several cities. He controlled part of the prefectures of Ouaddaï and Biltine. In December, the FAN, convinced that they could not seize Libyan materials, passed west and seized Oum Hadjer, Ati and Faya-Largeau. The OUA demanded in February 1982, but its request was ignored. By May the GUNT was stationed on the defensive in the capital, when Kamougué pulled back his forces to crush a revolt that had exploded in the south. Habré did not lose this opportunity, and on June 7, 1982, he conquered the capital almost without opposition, while Goukouni escaped to Cameroon. On June 19, Habré formed a State Council as new national government, and on October 21 he proclaimed himself President and nominated a new government. Goukouni and his followers regrouped in the north and obtained the support of Libya, which caused Habré to reclaim the Aouzou Strip which had been annexed by Libya.

On October 28, Goukouni allied eight of the eleven tendencies represented in the GUNT and formed the National Government for Peace in Chad (GNPT) and the Liberation Armed Forces (FAL), both headed by him. The FAL's first goal was to capture Faya-Largeau, which was attacked in January 1983; Habré sent his forces to defend the town, but they were defeated on February 20. Notwithstanding this, Faya-Largeau remained in Habré's hands. Goukouni reported some other victories in the north, but in the meanwhile Habré was being given abundant help by France and the west to counter the Libyan-supported Goukouni.

In March 1983, Chad requested the United Nations the recognition of Chadian sovereignty over the Aozou Strip, and posed the case of the Libyan occupation to the International Court of Justice of The Hague. But the FAL conquered Faya-Largeau on June 25, and with it a third of the country; an attack on the capital appeared imminent, but it never happened, mainly due to France's strong support of Habré. Great amounts of modern military equipment were provided to him by France and other western countries, giving him an opening to retake Faya-Largeau on July 30. Libya reacted by launching a massive counter-offensive composed almost entirely of Libyan regular troops. Habré suffered a crushing defeat on August 10, losing thousands of soldiers and falling back 200 km to the south.

On November 18, 1986, the GUNT was reconstituted under the direction of Habré and with participation of Goukouni and Kamougué. In 1989, opposition groups to Habré's rule present in Sudan, under the command of Idriss Déby, formed the Patriotic Salvation Movement (MPS) and initiated a new phase of the civil war. After conquering Abéché, in December 1990 they entered in the capital. Habré was forced once again to escape, but a few months later attempted from September 1991 to January 1992 a counter-offensive that proved unsuccessful. Finally a national conference attended by all the parties and guerrilla forces took place between January 15 and April 6, 1993, that culminated with the formation of a High Transitional Council under the presidency of Déby. The FROLINAT, of which Goukouni was still nominally the head, dissolved itself on January 14, 1993.
