= Oueddei Kichidemi =

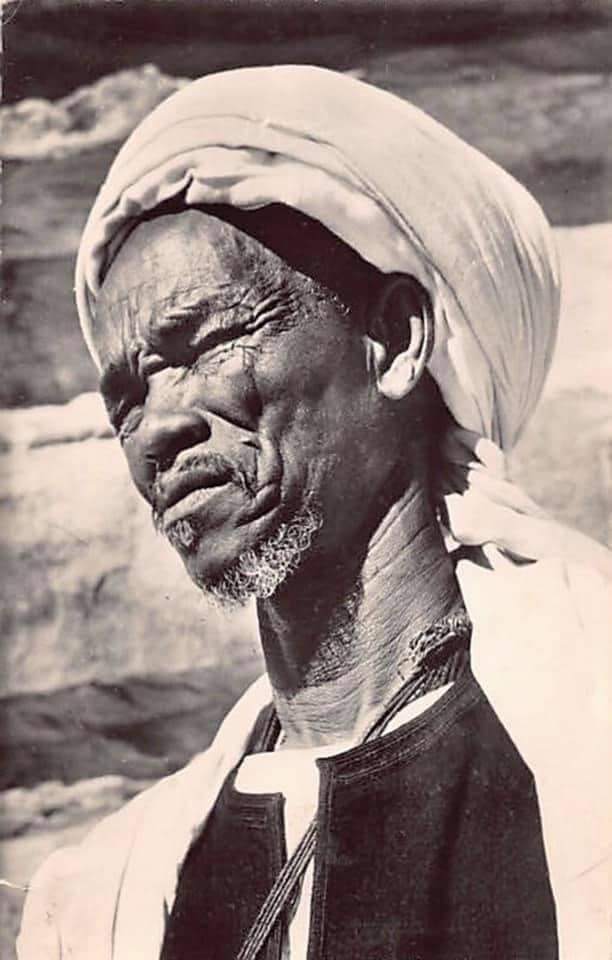
- Died: December 1977
- Children: Goukouni Oueddei

Oueddei Kichidemi (died December 1977), alternatively spelled Weddeye Kefedemi, was a Chadian chief. He was the father of the former Chadian President Goukouni Oueddei and served as the tribal leader, or derde, of the Toubou Teda of the Tibesti from 1938 to the First Chadian Civil War.

== Derde ==
Oueddei Kichidemi was elected derde in 1938 after the death of his predecessor Chahaï. However, the latter's family contested Kichidemi's legitimacy and even attempted to assassinate him on the day of his throne accession.

The derde exercises judicial rather than executive power, arbitrating conflict and levying sanctions based on a code of compensations. During the period of French rule in Chad, his authority had been respected; but when Chad became independent in 1960 and the last of the French forces left the Tibesti in 1965, the Teda found themselves under the control of Chadian authorities that looked down on the Toubou as backward.

== Exile ==
Provocations and abuses by the new authorities grew so unbearable that at the end of 1966 Kichidemi went in exile with a thousand of his followers to the oasis of Kufra in Libya. After that the President François Tombalbaye stripped him of his judicial powers and refused to appoint his son Goukouni as secretary of the Bardaï tribunal. Tombalbaye had also offended the derde by supporting a rival, Chaimi Sougoumi (the son of his predecessor Chahaï), for a seat from Tibesti in the National Assembly. What followed was an uprising of the Toubou, in which four of Kichidemi's five sons were killed, in what is considered the starting of the civil war in the north.

In exile Kichidemi became, with the support of Toubou students at the Islamic University of Bayda, a symbol of opposition to the Tombalbaye regime and its French allies. This role enhanced the position of the derde among the Toubou. After 1967 the derde hoped to rally the Toubou to the insurgent group FROLINAT. Moral authority became military authority shortly thereafter when his only surviving son, Goukouni, became in 1969 leader of the Second Liberation Army of FROLINAT.

Whereas the brutality of Chadian rule in the northern regions had temporarily united Kichidemi with his rivals in 1968, Tombalbaye and his French advisors (particularly Pierre Galopin) managed to reach an agreement with Sougoumi and another Toubou notable, Chahaï Sidimi. In exchange for loyalty to Tombalbaye's regime against the ousted derde, Sougoumi would get the aforementioned National Assembly seat, Sidimi the sub-prefecture in Bardaï, and the region would receive new subsidies and tax reductions. Goukouni Oueddei later cited this Chadian and French co-option of a local power struggle as "foundational in the history of the rebellion".

== Return to Chad ==
On April 13, 1975 Tombalbaye was killed in a coup. The new government attempted to reach out to the rebels, and among those who answered was Kichidemi, who returned from his Libyan exile in August. However, Goukouni refused to respond to his entreaties or those of the government and remained in opposition. Kichidemi died a few years after, in December 1977.
