= Chadian Armed Forces =

1960-1982 combined military force in Chad

The Chadian Armed Forces (Forces Armées Tchadiennes or FAT) were the army of the central government of Chad from 1960 to 1979, under the southern presidents François Tombalbaye and Félix Malloum, until the downfall of the latter in 1979, when the head of the gendarmerie, Wadel Abdelkader Kamougué, assumed command. Joined by gendarmerie units, FAT became a regional force representing primarily the Sara ethnic group of the five southern prefectures. It joined with the Transitional Government of National Unity (GUNT) forces fighting against Hissène Habré and was a recipient of aid from Libya. FAT began to disintegrate during 1982 as a result of defeats inflicted by Habré's Armed Forces of the North (FAN). Most remaining soldiers accepted integration into FAN or resumed their insurgency as codos.

== Branches ==
The Military of Chad is divided into three main branches of service:

- Chadian National Army
- Chadian Air Force
- Gendarmerie

== Military statistics ==
The Armed Forces of Chad have around 2.2 million women available to be drafted into their military as well as around 1.9 million men. People are considered fit for military service in Chad at the age of 20. People in Chad can volunteer to join the military at age 18, however if you wait until age 20 there is a 3-year service obligation. There is also no minimum age for volunteers as long as guardian consent is given. Women in Chad are subject to 1 year of compulsory military or civic service at the age of 21. The government of Chad spends around 4.2% of their GDP on their armed forces. The Chadian Armed Forces spend about One-Hundred and One million dollars in military spending. The Chadian Armed Forces are ranked eleventh overall recent military growth.

== See also ==
- FROLINAT
- Malloum's Military Government
- Civil war in Chad (1965–1979)
