= Transitional Government of National Unity (Chad) =

The Transitional Government of National Unity (Gouvernement d'Union Nationale de Transition or GUNT) was the coalition government of armed groups that nominally ruled Chad from 1979 to 1982, during the most chaotic phase of the long-running civil war that began in 1965. The GUNT replaced the fragile alliance led by Félix Malloum and Hissène Habré, which collapsed in February 1979. GUNT was characterized by intense rivalries that led to armed confrontations and Libyan intervention in 1980. Libya intervened in support of the GUNT's President Goukouni Oueddei, against the former GUNT Defence Minister Hissène Habré.

Because of international pressures and uneasy relations between Goukouni and Libyan leader Muammar al-Gaddafi, Goukouni asked the Libyans to leave Chad in November 1981; they were replaced by an Inter-African Force (IAF). The IAF showed itself unwilling to confront Habré's militia, and on June 7, 1982, the GUNT was ousted by Habré; Goukouni fled into exile.

The GUNT, always under the leadership of Goukouni, became a coalition of the opposition groups aiming to overthrow Habré. Libya played once again a decisive role, providing massive support to Goukouni, and reducing the GUNT to the status of a Libyan proxy. A French intervention blocked GUNT from overthrowing Habré in 1983 and limited Libyan-GUNT control to Northern Chad. Internal dissensions and problems with Libyan patronage, including the arrest of Goukouni by the Libyans, caused the disintegration of the GUNT in 1986.

== Civil war and mediation attempts ==
From 1979 to 1982, Chad experienced unprecedented change and spiraling violence. Southerners finally lost control of what remained of the Chadian government, while civil conflicts became significantly more internationalized.

In early 1979, the fragile Malloum-Habré alliance collapsed after months of aggressive actions by Habré, including demands that more northerners be appointed to high government offices and that Arabic be used in place of French in broadcasting. Appealing for support among the large communities of Muslims and Arabs in N'Djamena, Habré unleashed his Armed Forces of the North (FAN) on February 12. With the French garrison remaining uninvolved, FAN sent Félix Malloum into retirement (under French protection) and drove the remnants of the Chadian Armed Forces (FAT, the regular army) toward the south. On February 22, Goukouni Oueddei and the People's Armed Forces (FAP) entered the capital. By this time, most of the city's Sara population had fled to the south, where attacks against Muslims and nonsoutherners erupted, particularly in Sarh, Moundou, and throughout Moyen-Chari Prefecture. By mid-March more than 10,000 were said to have died as a result of violence throughout the south.

In early 1979, Chad became an open arena of unrestrained factional politics. Opportunistic power seekers sought to gather followers (often using sectarian appeals) and to win support from Chad's African neighbors. Between March 10 and August 21, four separate conferences took place in the Nigerian cities of Kano and Lagos, during which Chad's neighbors attempted to establish a political framework acceptable to the warring factions. Chad's neighbors, however, also used the meetings to pursue interests of their own, resulting in numerous externally generated complications and a growing number of factions brought into the process. For example, at one point, the Libyan leader Gaddafi became so angry with Habré that the Libyan sent arms to Colonel Wadel Abdelkader Kamougué's anti-Habré faction in the south, even though Kamougué was also anti-Libyan. At the second conference in Kano, both Habré and Goukouni were placed under what amounted to house arrest so Nigeria could promote the chances of a Kanembu leader, Lol Mahamat Choua. In fact, Nigerian support made Choua the Chadian titular head of state for a few weeks, even though his Third Liberation Army was only a phantom force, and his domestic political support was insignificant. Within Chad the warring parties used the conferences and their associated truces to recover from one round of fighting and prepare for the next.

== Goukouni becomes head of the GUNT ==
The final conference culminated in the Lagos Accord of August 21, 1979, which representatives of eleven Chadian factions signed and the foreign ministers of nine other African states witnessed. The Lagos Accord established the procedures for setting up the Transitional Government of National Unity, which was sworn into office in November. By mutual agreement, Goukouni was named president, Kamougué was appointed vice-president, and Habré was named minister of national defense, veterans, and war victims. The distribution of cabinet positions was balanced between south (eleven portfolios), north, center, and east (thirteen), and among protégés of neighboring states. A peacekeeping mission of the Organisation of African Unity (OAU), to be drawn from troops from Republic of the Congo, Guinea, and Benin, was to replace the French. This force never materialized in any effective sense, but the OAU was committed to GUNT under the presidency of Goukouni.

GUNT, however, failed. Its major participants deeply mistrusted each other, and they never achieved a sense of coherence. As a result, the various factional militias remained armed. By January 1980, a unit of Habré's army was attacking the forces of one of the constituent groups of GUNT in Ouaddaï Prefecture. Shortly thereafter, N'Djamena plunged into another cycle of violence, and by the end of March 1980 Habré was openly defying the government, having taken control of a section of the capital. The 600 Congolese troops of the OAU peacekeeping force remained out of the fray, as did the French, while units of five separate Chadian armies prowled the streets of N'Djamena. The battles continued throughout the summer, punctuated by more OAU mediation efforts and five formal ceasefires.

It became evident that the profound rivalry between Goukouni and Habré was at the core of the conflict. By mid-1980 the south - cut off from communication and trade with N'Djamena and defended by a regrouped, southern army - had become a state within a state. Colonel Kamougué, the strongman of the south, remained a prudent distance away from the capital and waited to negotiate with whichever northerner emerged as the winner.

== Libyan intervention ==
In 1980 the beleaguered Goukouni turned to Libya, much as he had done four years earlier. With the French forces having departed in mid-May 1980, Goukouni signed a military cooperation treaty with Libya in June (without prior approval of the all-but-defunct GUNT). In October he requested direct military assistance from Gaddafi, and by December Libyan forces had firm control of the capital and most other urban centers outside the south. Habré fled to Sudan, vowing to resume the struggle.

Although Libyan intervention enabled Goukouni to win militarily, the association with Qaddafi created diplomatic problems for GUNT. In January 1981, when Goukouni and Gaddafi issued a joint communiqué stating that Chad and Libya had agreed to "work for the realization of complete unity between the two countries", an international uproar ensued. Although both leaders later denied any intention to merge their states politically, the diplomatic damage had been done.

Throughout 1981 most of the members of the OAU, along with France and the United States, encouraged Libyan troops to withdraw from Chad. One week after the "unity communiqué", the OAU's committee on Chad met in Togo to assess the situation. In a surprisingly blunt resolution, the twelve states on the committee denounced the union goal as a violation of the 1979 Lagos Accord, called for Libya to withdraw its troops, and promised to provide a peacekeeping unit, the Inter-African Force (IAF). Goukouni was skeptical of OAU promises, but in September he received a French pledge of support for his government and the IAF.

But as Goukouni's relations with the OAU and France improved, his ties with Libya deteriorated. One reason for this deterioration was that the economic assistance that Libya had promised never materialized. Another, and perhaps more significant, factor was that Gaddafi was strongly suspected of helping Goukouni's rival within GUNT, Acyl Ahmat, leader of the Democratic Revolutionary Council (Conseil Démocratique Révolutionnaire or CDR). Both Habré and Goukouni feared Acyl because he and many of the members of the CDR were Arabs of the Awlad Sulayman tribe. About 150 years earlier, this group had migrated from Libya to Chad and thus represented the historical and cultural basis of Libyan claims in Chad.

== Habré overthrows Goukouni ==
As a consequence of the Libya-Chad rift, Goukouni asked the Libyan forces in late October 1981 to leave, and by mid-November they had complied. Their departure, however, allowed Habré's FAN - reconstituted in eastern Chad with Egyptian, Sudanese, and, reportedly, significant United States assistance - to win key positions along the highway from Abéché to N'Djamena. Habré was restrained only by the arrival and deployment in December 1981 of some 4,800 IAF troops from Nigeria, Senegal, and Zaire.

In February 1982, a special OAU meeting in Nairobi resulted in a plan that called for a ceasefire, negotiations among all parties, elections, and the departure of the IAF; all terms were to be carried out within six months. Habré accepted the plan, but Goukouni rejected it, asserting that Habré had lost any claim to legitimacy when he broke with GUNT. When Habré renewed his military advance toward N'Djamena, the IAF remained essentially neutral, just as the French had done when the FROLINAT marched on Malloum three years earlier. FAN secured control of the capital on June 7. Goukouni and other members of GUNT fled to Cameroon and eventually reappeared in Libya. For the remainder of the year, Habré consolidated his power in much of war-weary Chad and worked to secure international recognition for his government.
