= People's Armed Forces =

Insurgent group

The People's Armed Forces (Forces Armées Populaires or FAP) was a Chadian insurgent group composed of followers of Goukouni Oueddei after the schism with Hissène Habré in 1976. With an ethnic base in the Teda clan of the Toubou from the Tibesti area of northern Chad, the force was armed by Libya and formed the largest component of the Transitional Government of National Unity (GUNT) coalition army opposing Habré. FAP troops rebelled against their Libyan allies in the latter part of 1986. Many of them were subsequently integrated into the national army, the Chadian National Armed Forces (FANT), and participated in the 1987 attempt to drive Libya out of Chadian territory.

== See also ==
- FROLINAT
- Malloum's Military Government
- Civil war in Chad (1965–1979)
