= Félix Malloum =

President of Chad from 1975 to 1979

- فليكس معلوم

2nd President of Chad
- In office 15 April 1975 – 23 March 1979
- Prime Minister: Hissène Habré
- Vice President: Mamari Djime Ngakinar (1975–1978); Hissène Habré (1978–1979)
- Preceded by: François Tombalbaye; Noël Milarew Odingar (acting)
- Succeeded by: Goukouni Oueddei (acting); Lol Mahamat Choua

Personal details
- Born: Félix Malloum Ngakoutou Bey-Ndi; 10 September 1932 Fort Archambault, French Chad
- Died: 12 June 2009 (aged 76) Paris, France
- Spouse: Khalié Brahim Djadarab (separated late 1970s)

Military service
- Allegiance: France (1951–1960); Chad (1960–1979)
- Branch: French Army; Chadian Ground Forces
- Service years: 1951–1979
- Rank: Brigadier general
- Conflicts: First Indochina War; First Chadian Civil War

Félix Malloum Ngakoutou Bey-Ndi (Arabic: فليكس معلوم Filiks Mʿalūm; 10 September 1932 – 12 June 2009), better known as Félix Malloum, was a Chadian military officer and politician who served as the second president of Chad from 1975 until his resignation in 1979.

A native of southern Chad, Malloum became a high-ranking officer in the Chadian military under the country's first president, François Tombalbaye. In the context of the first Chadian Civil War, he was arrested and imprisoned by Tombalbaye in 1972 after being suspected of plotting a coup. Following Tombalbaye's overthrow and assassination during the 1975 Chadian coup d'état, he became the country's new president, inheriting the civil war against northern rebels.

In 1978, he integrated the forces of rebel leader Hissène Habré, who was appointed prime minister, into his military to fight against rival rebel leader Goukouni Oueddei. Their alliance was short-lived, and Habré soon turned against Malloum in 1979. Under the terms of the Kano Accord, Malloum resigned, while a new transitional government was created using a power-sharing agreement between Habré and Goukouni. After spending 23 years in exile in Nigeria, he returned to Chad in 2002 and died in a hospital in France seven years later.

== Biography ==
He attended the French military academy and saw action in Indochina and Algeria. He later served as an officer in the Chadian Military and a member of the ruling Chadian Progressive Party (PPT). In 1966 he married Khalié Brahim Djadarab, having a son with her. In 1971, he became the Chief of General Staff with the rank of colonel and named Commander-in-chief of the Armed Forces in 1972. In July 1973, he was arrested and imprisoned by President François Tombalbaye on charges of conspiring against the government. He was also related to the politician Kalthouma Nguembang, who was tortured by Tombalbaye's regime.

Malloum was released after a successful coup-d'etat on 13 April 1975. He served as both President and Prime Minister of Chad until 29 August 1978, when Hissène Habré was appointed Prime Minister to integrate armed northern rebels into the government. However, he was unsuccessful and resigned from the presidency on 23 March 1979 (under pressure from foreign minister Kamougué) after signing the Kano Accord which allowed the rebels to form a provisional government. Malloum retired permanently from politics and settled in Nigeria immediately after the Kano accord had been finalized.

He returned to the Chadian capital N'Djamena on 31 May 2002, after 23 years in exile. Upon his return he was entitled to the various benefits allowed to former presidents; these benefits included a monthly stipend of 3,000,000 CFA francs, a residence, and coverage of his health expenses, along with two vehicles and a driver.

Malloum died from cardiac arrest aged 76 on 12 June 2009 at the American Hospital in Paris, France.

Political offices
Preceded by Noël Milarew Odingar	Head of State of Chad; 1975–1979	Succeeded by Goukouni Oueddei
