= Souleymane Guengueng =

Souleymane Guengueng is a Chadian torture victim and human rights activist who was instrumental in bringing legal action against the former dictator Hissène Habré. He was born in 1952.

In 2006 he and more than 90 others testified against Habré in a court in Senegal.

He plays himself in the 2007 movie The Dictator Hunter by director Klaartje Quirijns. He spent three years of his life in prison.
