= Derde =

Title among the Toubou Teda in Chad

The derde (derda, derdai, dardai) is the title held by the highest religious and political authority among the Toubou Teda of the Tibesti region in north-western Chad. He is elected among the three most prominent families of the Tomagra clan. At the death of the derde the title almost never passes to the son of the deceased (and even rarely to his grandson), but to a member of the other two families. Although the title has not corresponded to a true position of political power ever since the colonial era, the derde remains a highly esteemed moral authority and has been described as the main unifying factor binding together the Toubou of Chad, Libya and Niger.

The derde exercises judicial and executive power, arbitrating conflict and levying sanctions based on a code of compensations. He is assisted in the exercise of his role by a council of nobles. Like the derde himself, his spouse is also obliged to originate from the Tomagra clan. Despite this strong link to one specific clan, there is a social expectation that the chief should not favorize either his own family or his own clan.

== History ==
=== Origins and pre-colonial era ===
Chadian tradition states that, prior to the ascent of the Tomagra clan, the position of derde vascillated between the Arna, Gonna (or Gounda), Derdékéchiya and Tozoba clans. The derde still ceremonially dons a camel to each of these four "original" clans upon ascension. It appears that in the 12th century the derde of the Tomagra of Bornu had already established its preeminence over much of the Tibesti, through the lines of succession still valid today. The Teda of the Tibesti in the 17th and 18th centuries distinguished themselves for their raids from the Fezzan to the north and to Borno to the south.

Shortly before the beginning of the colonial era, the derde Chai introduced the payment of blood money as compensation in murder cases, to counteract the prevalence of revenge killings. This payment was to be made in the form of camels. Moreover, it differed according to origin and gender, revealing a sharp underlying inequality: the "price" for pure Teda men was 100 camels, for pure Teda women 50 camels, and for people of other ethnicities (who are held to be descendants of captives) 25 or 30 camels.

=== Colonial and post-colonial era ===
When the French colonial forces in 1907 carried out their first raids in northern Chad, the derde asked for the help of the Ottomans, who responded by establishing a few garrisons in Tibesti; but they were evacuated when the Ottomans were forced to cede Libya to Italy. The first French troops arrived later in 1914, but a moderate degree of control was exercised only from the 1930s. The derde collaborated with the French, retaining or even increasing this way their political and religious authority.

Chad became independent in 1960, and in 1965 the Chadian administration settled itself in Tibesti. The derde, Oueddei Kichidemi (the father of rebel leader and future president Goukouni Oueddei), saw himself stripped of his powers by the new government, provoking him in going in exile in 1966, an event considered the signal of the start of the Chadian Civil War in the north. The Chadian regime and its close ally France then struck an agreement with rival Teda chiefs to promote them politically and invest in the region in exchange for loyalty against Oueddei. The derde became now for the first time a national symbol through his opposition to the government, a role that after 1975, when the derde returned in Chad, was never to be recovered again.

Throughout his rule from 1990 onward, Idriss Déby frequently reinforced the political co-optation of the derde while simultaneously oppressing or arresting those chiefs suspected of sympathizing with opposition movements.

== Sources ==
- "A Country Study: Chad". Library of Congress Country Studies. 1990.
- J. Brachet & J. Scheele (2015). "Fleeting Glory in a Wasteland: Wealth, Politics, and Autonomy in Northern Chad". Comparative Studies in Society and History, 57(3), 723-752. doi:10.1017/S0010417515000262
- J.E. Getty & D. Mabrouk (2018). Teda, Tubu, Tebou, Toubou: La Civilisation. Tubu Academy Press
- A. Zaborski, "Tubu" in Encyclopaedia of Islam
