= Armed Forces of the North =

Rebel group in Chad in 1976–1984

- Forces Armées du Nord
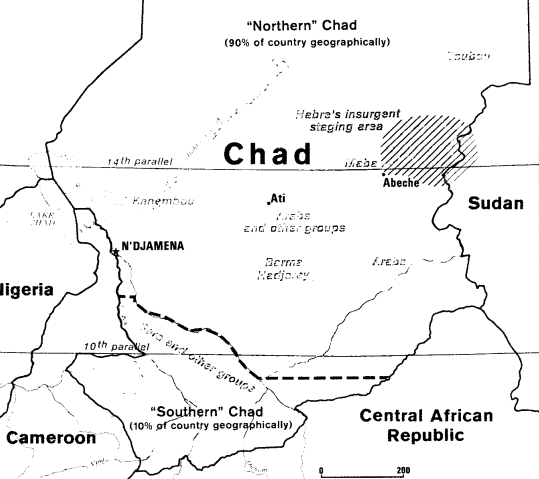
- FAN staging area in late 1981
- Leader: Hissène Habré
- Dates active: 1976–February 1983
- Split from: FROLINAT
- Headquarters: Tripoli
- Active regions: Chad
- Ideology: Chadian nationalism Anti-communism; Anti-Gaddafism
- Wars: the Chadian Civil War (1965–1979)

The Armed Forces of the North (French: Forces Armées du Nord, FAN) was a Chadian rebel army active during the Chadian Civil War. Composed of FROLINAT units that remained loyal to Hissène Habré following his break from Goukouni Oueddei and the CCFAN in 1976. Consisting at first of only a few hundred Toubou and some Hajerai and Ouaddaïan fighters, FAN began its operations from bases in eastern Chad, where it received help from Sudan. Driven from N'Djamena back to its eastern refuge after the Libyan incursion of 1980, FAN scored a series of victories over Goukouni's Transitional Government of National Unity (GUNT) forces in 1982, which culminated in the recapture of N'Djamena and Habré's assumption of the presidency. FAN became the core of the new national army, Chadian National Armed Forces (FANT), in February 1983.

== See also ==
- FROLINAT
- Malloum's Military Government
- Civil war in Chad (1965–1979)
