= Toubou people =

Ethnic group in the central Sahara

Toubou
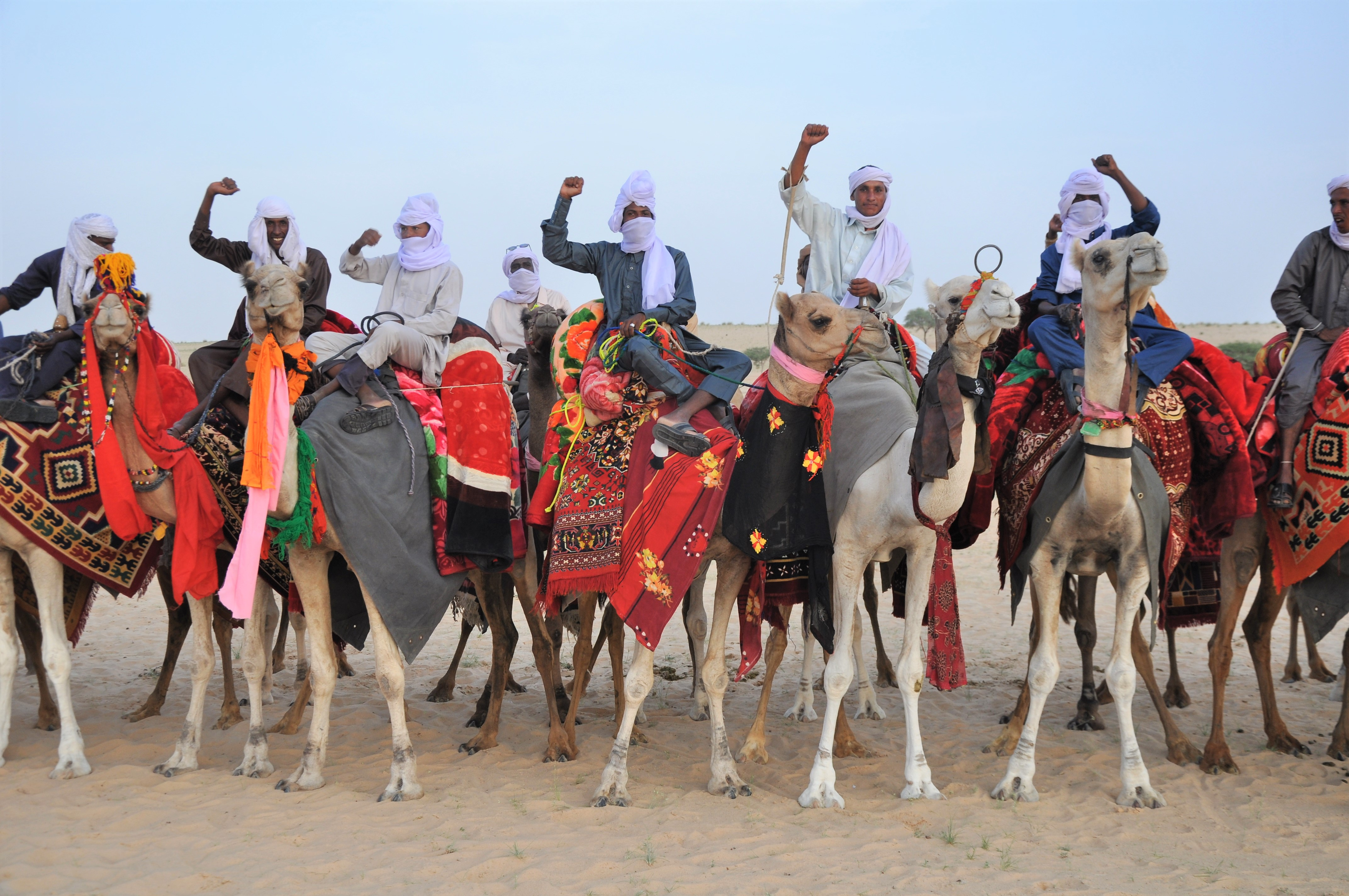
- Toubou men in traditional gear

Total population
- c. 1,225,933

Regions with significant populations
- Chad: 1,074,343
- Niger: 101,590
- Libya: 50,000–85,000

Languages
- Tebu languages (Daza, Teda); Arabic (Chadian Arabic, Libyan Arabic)

Religion
- Islam (Sunni)

Related ethnic groups
- Kanembu, Kanuri, Zaghawa

The Toubou or Tubu ("man who lives in Tibesti" in the Kanuri language, or alternatively from Old Tebu, meaning "rock people") are an ethnic group native to the Tibesti Mountains that inhabit the central Sahara in northern Chad, southern Libya, northeastern Niger, and northwestern Sudan. They live either as herders and nomads or as farmers near oases. Their society is clan-based, with each clan having certain oases, pastures and wells.

The Toubou are generally divided into two closely related groups: the Teda and the Daza. They are believed to share a common origin and speak the Tebu languages, which are from the Saharan branch of the Nilo-Saharan language family. The Tebu people are also referred to as the Tabu, Tebou, Tibu, 'Tibbu, Toda, Todga, Todaga, Tubu, Tuda, Tudaga, or Gorane people. The Daza are sometimes referred to as Gouran (or Gorane, Goran, Gourane), an Arabian exonym. Tebu is divided further into two closely related languages or dialects, called Tedaga (Téda Toubou) and Dazaga (Daza Toubou). Of the two groups, the Daza, found to the south of the Teda, are more numerous.

Many of Chad's leaders have been Toubou (Gouran), including presidents Goukouni Oueddei and Hissène Habré.

== Distribution ==
The Toubou people's approximate distribution.

The Toubou people have historically lived in northern Chad, northeastern Niger, and southern Libya. They have sometimes been called the "black nomads of the Sahara". They are distributed across a large area in the central Sahara, as well as the north-central Sahel. They are particularly found north of the Tibesti Mountains, which in Old Tebu means "rocky mountains". The first syllable tou refers to the Tibesti Mountains, as known by the natives (touda), and the second syllable bou refers to blood in the Kanembou language; thus, people from the Tibesti region are referred to as Toubou and their name is derived from this.

The Teda are found primarily in the Sahara regions around the borders of southeast Libya, northeast Niger and northern Chad. They consider themselves a warrior people. The Daza live towards the Sahel region and are spread over much of north-central Chad. The Daza consist of numerous clans. Major tribes, clans, or societies of the Daza include the Alala, Altafa, Anakaza, Ankorda, Ayya, Sharara, Sharfada, Shuna, Daza, Djagada, Dogorda, Donza, Gadwa, Gaeda, Howda, Kamaya, Kamsoulla, Kara, Ketcherda, Kokorda, Mageya, Medelea, Mourdiya, Nara, Salma, Tchiroua, Tchoraga, Wandala, Wanja, Warba, Warda, and Yira among others.

The Daza cover the northern regions of Chad such as the Bourkou, the Ennedi Plateau, the northern Kanem, the Bahr el Gazel in the south and also the Tibesti mountains and the neighbouring countries. There is a diaspora community of several thousand Daza living in Omdurman, Sudan and a few thousand working in Jeddah, Saudi Arabia.

== History ==
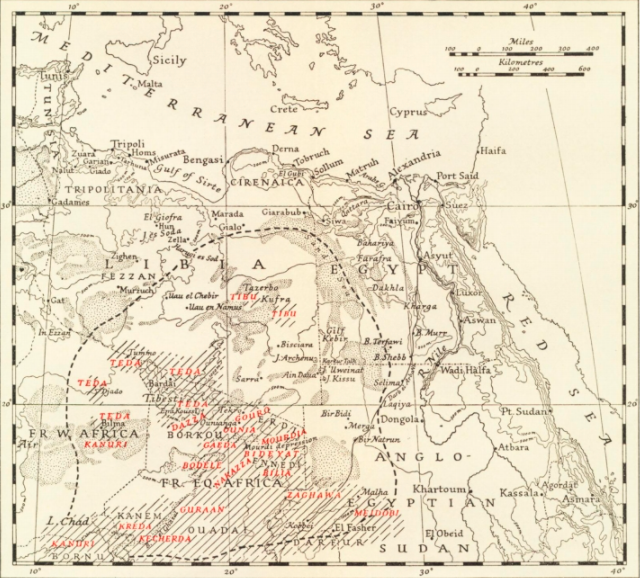
The zones occupied by the Toubou and the local names of the tribal confederacies that occupy these zones

The ancient history of the Toubou people is unclear. They may be related to the 'Ethiopians' mentioned by Herodotus in 430 BCE, as a people being hunted by the Garamantes, but Jean Chapelle argues that this connection is speculative. Scholars such as Laurence P. Kirwan stress that the Garamantes and the Toubou seem to occupy the same lands, spanning from the Fezzan (Phazania) as far south as Nubia. Harold MacMichael stated in 1912 that the Bayuda desert was still known at the time as the "desert of Goran", a name connected with the modern Kura'án (Goran), affirming that the contemporary Kura'án people occupied much of the same territory as the Garamantes once did.

In Islamic literature, the earliest known mention of the Toubou people, along with that of the Zaghawa people, is in an 9th-century text by Arabic scholar Ibn Qutaybah. The 9th century scholar al-Khwarizmi also mentioned the Daza people (southern Teda).

During the expansive era of Trans-Saharan trade, the Toubou inhabited lands which were frequently used by merchant caravans, specifically along the Kufra oasis routes. It is unknown if the Toubou engaged with the caravans.

In the 18th century, the local Toubou peoples of Kaouar were an independent city until 1870, when the ruling Kerdusian tribe (Sanhajan from Zawiya) of Fezzan al Hasan al Balaazi ended their rule, according to a manuscript.

== Genetics ==
According to a study published in The American Journal of Human Genetics (Haber et al. 2016) that examined Y-DNA haplogroups from samples obtained from 75 Toubou men. Haplogroups associated with paternal Eurasian origins were present at rates of 34% for R1b (R1b-V88), 31% for T1a, and 1% for J1. The North African associated haplogroups E-M78 were present at rates of 28%, while E-M81 appeared at a rate of 5%. The study also found that 20–30% of Toubou autosomal DNA was Eurasian in origin, and their African ancestral component was best represented by Laal-speaking populations. The most likely source of this Eurasian DNA, according to the analysis, was central European Neolithic farmers (Linearbandkeramik culture). Other ethnic groups in the Chad, such as the Sara people and the Laal speakers had considerably lower Eurasian admixture, at only 0.3–2% (Sara) and 1.25–4.5% (Laal).

In 2019, B Lorente-Galdos, using whole genome analysis, found that in the two Northeastern Sub-Saharan samples, Western Eurasian ancestry in their Toubou sample was 31.4%, and it was 14.9% for the East African Bantu. The Toubou maintained similar genetic distance to other Sub-Saharan samples, but were also genetically close to North African and non-African samples. The Eurasian component in the North African individuals was present at high rates of 84.9% for the Sahrawi, and 76.0% for the Libyan. North African samples were closer to Eurasian populations than to Sub-Saharan populations, implying that the Sahara Desert might have represented a major barrier within Africa. In contrast, the three Khoisan groups presented significantly small proportions of a Eurasian component (3.83–4.11%).

== Society ==
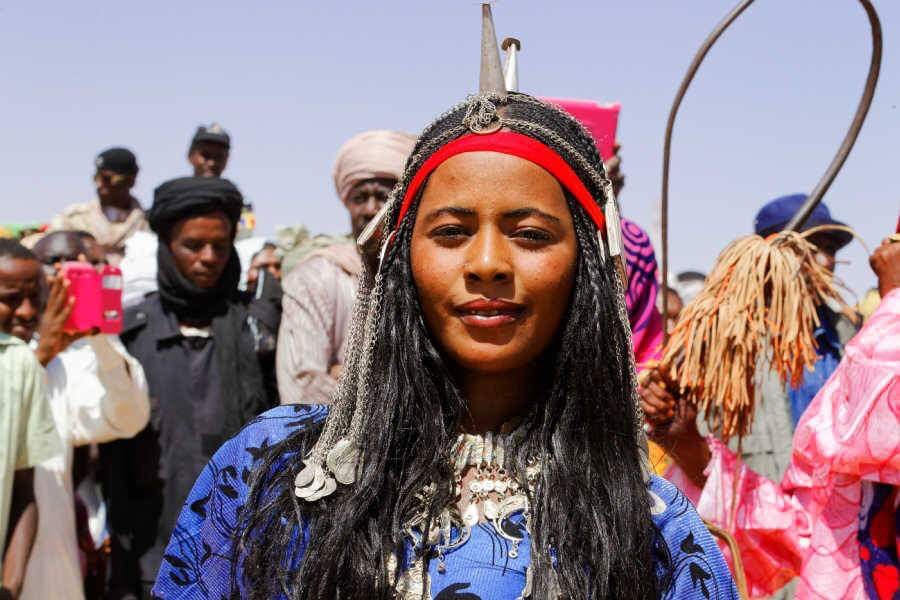
Toubou (Goran) woman in traditional attire

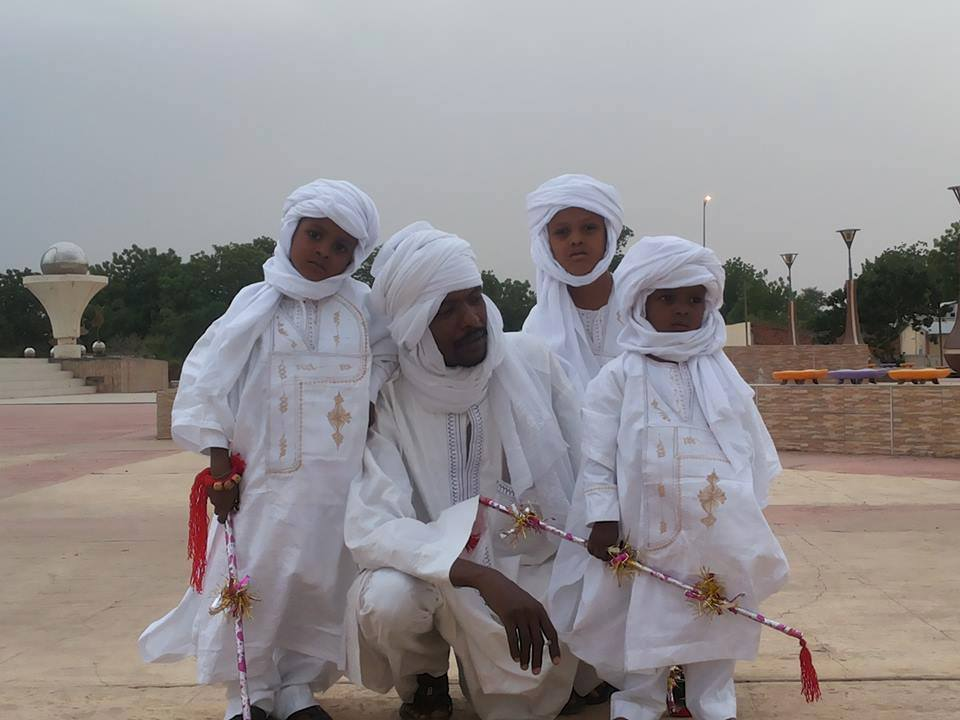
Toubou family in Chad

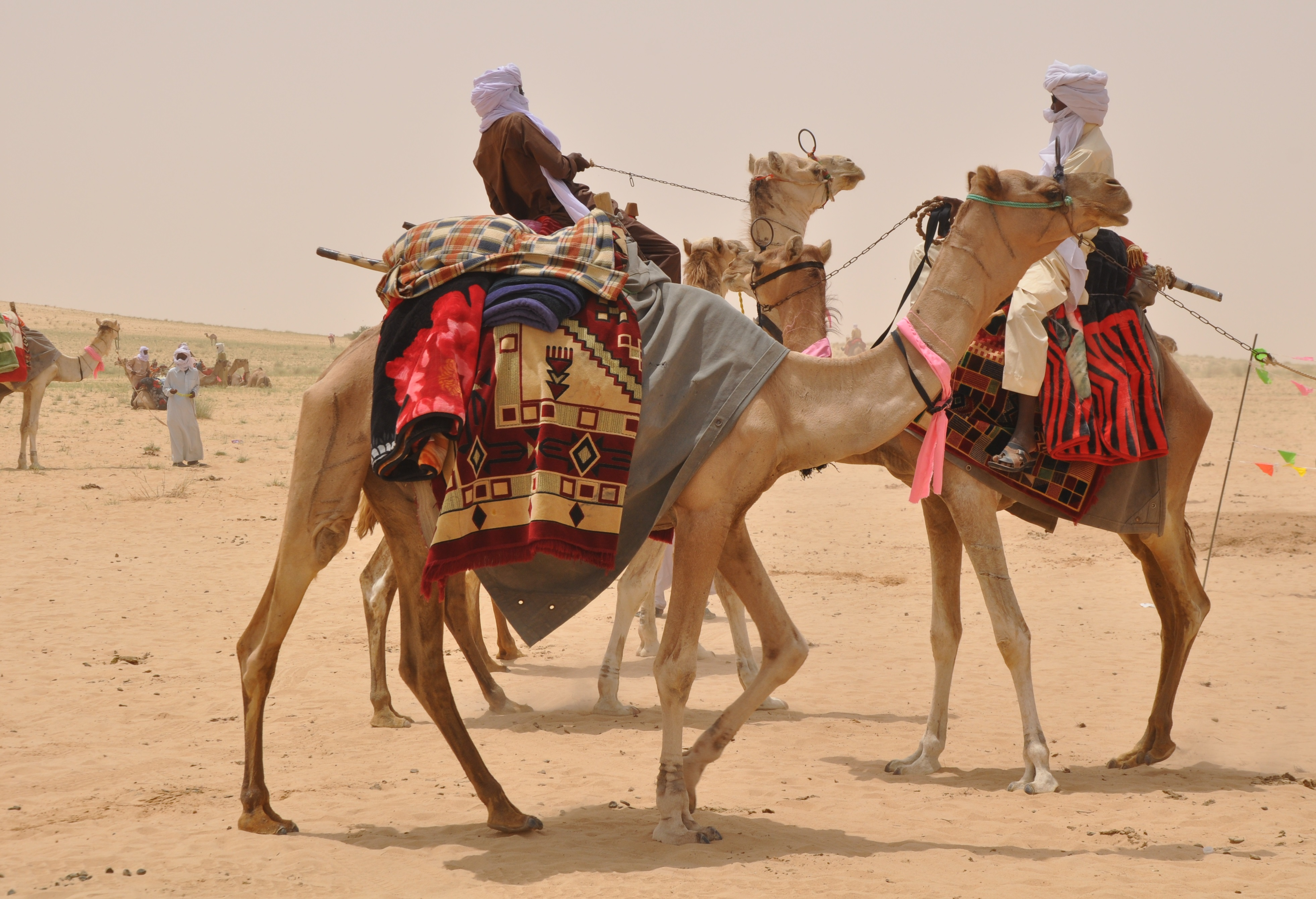
Toubou camel riders north of N'Gourti, Niger

=== Livelihood ===
Toubou life centers on raising and herding their livestock, or on farming the scattered oases where they cultivate dates, grain and legumes. Their herds include dromedaries, goats, cattle, donkeys and sheep. Livestock is a major part of their wealth and trade. Livestock is also used as a part of dowry payment during marriage, either where the groom's family agrees to pay to the bride's family in exchange for the bride, or where the livestock is given by the bride's kin to supply the young couple with economic resources in order to start a family.

In a few places, the Toubou also mine salt and natron, a salt-like substance which is essential in nearly all components of Toubou life, including medicine, preservation, tanning, soap production, textiles and livestock. It is also an ingredient in chewing tobacco. Literacy rates among the Toubou are quite low.

=== Clan ===
Many Toubou people still follow a semi-nomadic pastoralist lifestyle. Those who prefer a settled life typically live in palm-thatched, rectangular or cylindrical mud houses. The Toubou are patrilineal, with an elder male heading the lineage. The second order of Toubou kinship is to the clan.

According to Jean Chapelle, a colonial history officer specializing in Chadian ethnic groups (although his book in Borkou has caused a significant degree of wrongdoing), the clan system developed out of necessity. Nomadic life means being scattered throughout a region; therefore, belonging to a clan means that the individual is likely to find hospitable clan people in most settlements or camps of any size.

A second factor is maintaining ties with the maternal clan. Although the maternal clan does not occupy the central place of the parental clan, it provides ties. The third factor is protective relationships at the primary residence.

Despite a common linguistic heritage, the institution of the clan holds the highest sense of identity among Toubou peoples. Regional divisions do exist, however. In 1936, the Chadian government under French colonization conferred legality and legitimacy on Toubou regional groupings in Chad by dividing the Daza and Teda regions into territorial units called cantons. Al-Haj Kelleï Chahami, from the Kamaya canton in Borkou region's Faya city, was appointed as the cantons' first chief. Even after Chad gained its independence in 1960, the cantons continued to exist.

Toubou legal customs are generally based on Islamic law, which allows restitution and revenge. Murder, for example, is settled directly between the families of the victim and the murderer. Toubou honour requires that someone from the victim's family try to kill the murderer or a relative; such efforts eventually end with negotiations to settle the matter.

Reconciliation follows the payment of the Goroga (Islamic tenet of Diyya), or blood money. Among the Tumagra clan of the Teda people in the Tibesti region, there is a derde (spiritual head) who is recognized as the clan judge, and arbitrates conflict and levies sanctions.

=== Social stratification ===
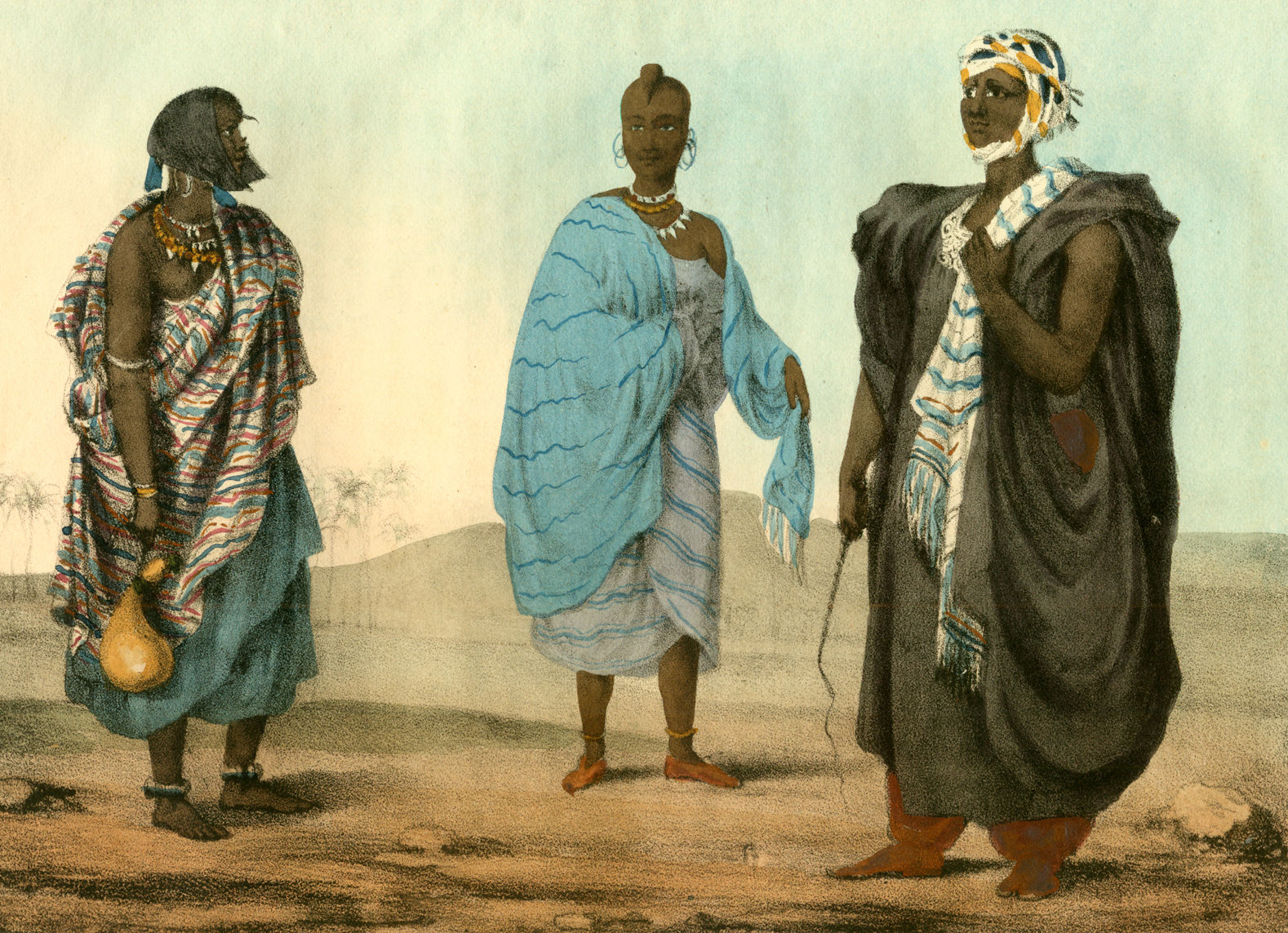
Toubou people in Qatrun, by George Francis Lyon, 1821

The Toubou people, states Jean Chapelle, were historically socially stratified with an embedded caste system. The three strata of the caste system consisted of freemen with a right to own property, artisanal castes, and slaves.

The endogamous caste of Azza (or Aza) among the Toubou have artisanal occupations, such as metalworking, leatherworking, salt mining, well digging, dates farming, pottery, and tailoring. Its members have traditionally been despised and segregated by other strata of the Toubou, much like the Hadahid caste in southeastern Chad among the Zaghawa people. According to Paul Lovejoy – a professor of African History, 19th-century records show that these segregated Toubou castes followed the same customs and traditions as the rest of the Toubou, but they were independent in their politics and beliefs, much like the artisan castes found in many ethnic groups of western Chad such as the Kanembou, Yedina, Arab, Kouri and Danawa.

Marriage between a member of the Azza and a member from a different strata of the Toubou people has been culturally unacceptable. The Azza are Dazaga-speaking people who sprang from the Dazagara. The majority of Teda speak and understand Dazaga; however, the Dazagada do not always clearly grasp Tedaga. Dazaga is the most commonly used language in BET by all its inhabitants.

The lowest social strata were the slaves (Agara). Slaves entered the Toubou Teda and Daza societies from raids and warfare on other ethnic groups in lands to their south. All slaves were the property of their masters, their caste was endogamous, and their status was inherited by birth.

The Darda (supreme leader) Kelleï Chahaïmi of the Kamaya canton in 1953, in agreement with the French colonizers, decreed the emancipation of all slaves and suppressed the use of captives in the Borkou region. Slaves from neighboring regions, such as Tibesti and Ennedi, subsequently discovered the liberation center in Borkou. Several of these slaves escaped and sought refuge in Borkou under the protection of the Kamaya canton. They were subsequently emancipated by Chahaïmi, who granted them land on which to settle. This district was formerly referred to as "Ni-Agaranga" in Dazaga, which literally translates as "country of slaves", in the city of Faya-Largeau. However, the Borkou municipality later renamed it "Quartier Huit" (Eighth Quarter) as a euphemistic expression. After the abolition of slavery in 1953, Chahaïmi admitted the descendants of former captives into the canton, where they were recognized as full members and could move freely; in this way, the last fraction of the Kamaya canton was established. Captives were not the only groups attached to the Kamaya canton; foreigners who resided in Faya, including Fezzanis (Libyan refugees who fled Italian brutality in 1929 before the advance of Italian colonial forces into the Fezzan region of southern Libya), Ouaddaians from Chad's Waddai region, prostitutes, blacksmiths, and others were also attached to the Kamaya canton. The concerns of all these individuals were conveyed to the colonizers through the canton.

=== Marriage ===
The Teda, in particular, forbids marriage between cousins, up to 9 generations unrelated, a tradition prevalent with many Muslim ethnic groups in Africa. However, the Daza of Kanem, Bahr el-Ghazal, and certain clans in Ennedi marry close cousins since it is not prohibited in the Quran. They also doubt the origins of individuals and misalliance. A man may marry and have multiple wives according to Islamic tenets, however, this practice is only somewhat prevalent in Toubou society.

The ownership of land, animals, and resources takes several forms. Within an oasis or settled zone belonging to a particular clan, land, trees (usually date palms), and nearby wells may have different owners. Each family's rights to the use of particular plots of land are recognized by other clan members. Families also may have privileged access to certain wells and the right to a part of the harvest from the fields irrigated by their water. Within the clan and family contexts, individuals also may have personal claims to palm trees and animals.

== Contemporary conditions ==
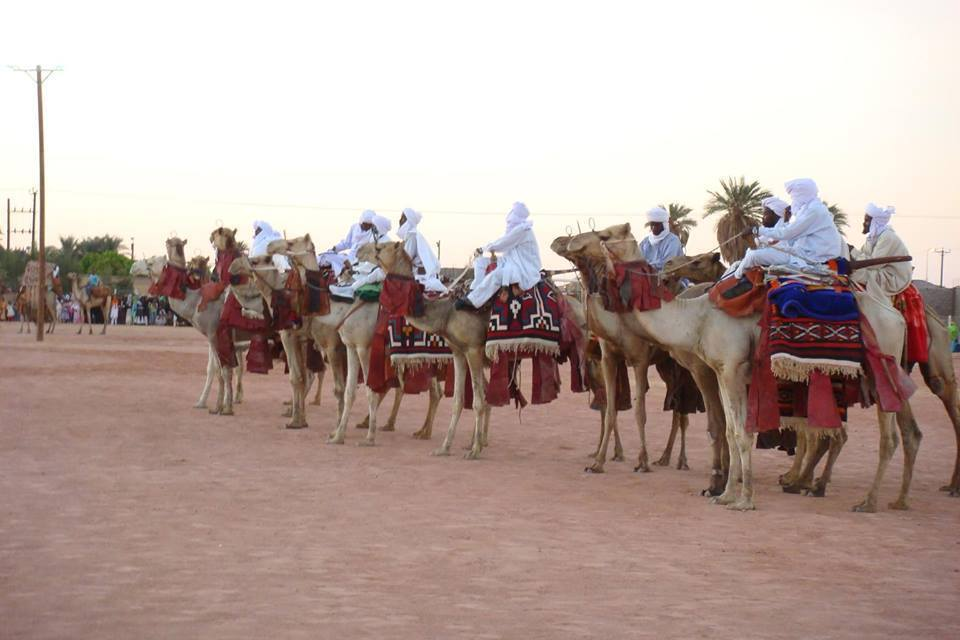
Toubou (Gorane) camel show

=== Chad ===
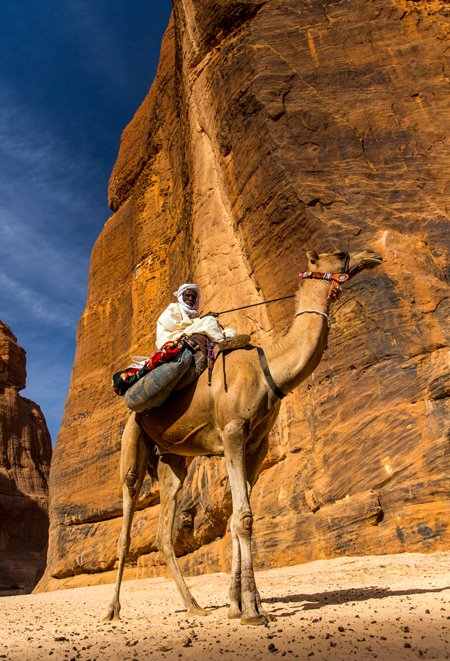
Toubou (Gorane) camel rider in Ennedi plateau, Chad

Flag of the Toubou people used in Chad

Much of the political class of Chad are drawn from Dazzaga. During the First Chadian Civil War (1966–1979), the derde came to occupy a more important position. In 1965 the Chadian government assumed direct authority over the Tibesti Mountains, sending a military garrison and administrators to Bardaï, the capital of Tibesti Sub-prefecture. Within a year, abuses of authority had roused considerable opposition among the Toubou. The derde, Oueddei Kichidemi, recognized but little respected up to that time, protested the excesses, went into exile in Libya, and, with the support of Toubou students at the Islamic University of Bayda, became a symbol of opposition to the Chadian government. This role enhanced the position of the Derde from the Tumagra tribe of Toubou.

After 1967 the derde hoped to rally the Toubou to the National Liberation Front of Chad (FROLINAT). Moral authority became military authority shortly thereafter when his son, Goukouni Oueddei, became one of the leaders of the Second Liberation Army of FROLINAT. Goukouni was to become a national figure; he played an important role in the battles of N'Djamena in 1979 and 1980 and served as head of state for a time. Another northerner, Hissène Habré of the Dazagra, replaced Goukouni of the Teda in 1982, and eventually lost power to the Zaghawa Idriss Déby after 8 years.

=== Libya ===
Situation in Libya in May 2016

Flag of the Toubou Front for the Salvation of Libya

The Toubou minority in Libya suffered what has been described as "massive discrimination" both under the leadership of Muammar Gaddafi as well as after the Libyan civil war.

In a report released by the UNHCR, the Society for Threatened Peoples (STP) reported "massive discrimination" against the Toubou minority, which resides in the southeastern corner of the country around the oasis town of Kufra. In December 2007, the Gaddafi government stripped Toubou Libyans of their citizenship, claiming that they were not Libyans, but rather Chadians. In addition, local authorities denied Toubou people access to education and healthcare. In response, an armed group called the Toubou Front for the Salvation of Libya (TFSL) staged an uprising in November 2008 which lasted for five days and claimed 33 lives before being crushed by government security forces. Despite resistance and public condemnation, the Gaddafi regime continued its persecution of the Toubou minority in Libya. Beginning in November 2009, the government began a program of forced eviction and demolition of Toubou homes, rendering many Toubou homeless. Several dozens who protested the destruction were arrested, and families who refused to leave their homes were beaten.

In the Libyan Civil War, Toubou tribespeople in Libya sided with the rebel anti-Gaddafi forces and participated in the Fezzan campaign against forces loyal to Muammar Gaddafi, briefly capturing the town of Qatrun and claiming to capture Murzuk for the rebel movement a month later.

In March 2012, bloody clashes broke out between Toubou and Arab tribesmen in the southern city of Sabha, Libya. In response, Issa Abdel Majid Mansour, the leader of the Toubou tribes in Libya threatened a separatist bid, decrying what he saw as "ethnic cleansing" against Toubou and declaring "We announce the reactivation of the Toubou Front for the Salvation of Libya to protect the Toubou people from ethnic cleansing." The TFSL was the opposition group active in the unrest of 2007–2008 that was "ruthlessly persecuted" by the Gaddafi government.

== See also ==
- Demographics of Chad
- Demographics of Libya
- Demographics of Niger
