= Hissène Habré =

President of Chad from 1982 to 1990

- حسين حبري
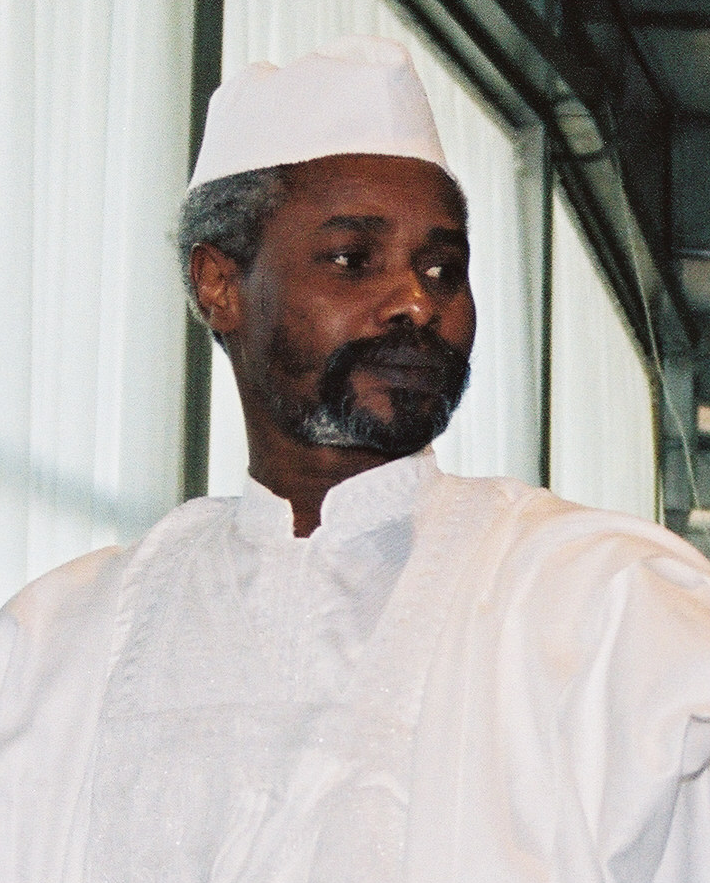
- Habré in 1989

5th President of Chad
- In office 29 October 1982 – 1 December 1990; Acting: 7 June – 29 October 1982
- Prime Minister: Djidingar Dono Ngardoum (1982)
- Preceded by: Goukouni Oueddei
- Succeeded by: Idriss Déby

1st Prime Minister of Chad
- In office 29 August 1978 – 23 March 1979
- President: Felix Malloum
- Preceded by: Office established; François Tombalbaye (as Prime Minister of French Chad)
- Succeeded by: Djidingar Dono Ngardoum

2nd Vice President of Chad
- In office 29 August 1978 – 23 March 1979
- President: Felix Malloum
- Preceded by: Mamari Djimé Ngakinar
- Succeeded by: Negue Djogo

Leader of the UNIR
- In office 24 June 1984 – 3 December 1990
- Preceded by: Party established
- Succeeded by: Party abolished

Personal details
- Born: 13 August 1942 Faya-Largeau, French Chad, French Equatorial Africa
- Died: 24 August 2021 (aged 79) Dakar, Senegal
- Resting place: Yoff Muslim cemetery
- Party: UNIR (1984–1990)
- Other political affiliations: FROLINAT (1972–1984)
- Spouses: Fatime Hachem Habré; Fatime Raymonde
- Education: École nationale de la France d'Outre-Mer; Aosta Valley University; University of Paris II Panthéon-Assas

Military service
- Allegiance: Chad
- Branch: Chadian Armed Forces
- Service years: 1972–1990
- Conflicts: First Chadian Civil War; Chadian–Libyan War; Toyota War

Criminal details
- Criminal information
- Convictions: Crimes against humanity See list: (1) Rape; (2) Forced slavery; (3) Voluntary homicide; (4) Systematic practice of mass summary executions; (5) Kidnapping of people; (6) Torture and inhumane acts
- Penalty: Life imprisonment

Details
- Victims: >40,000 alleged Chadian dissidents
- Span of crimes: 1982–1990
- Date apprehended: 15 November 2005
- Imprisoned at: Prison du Cap Manuel

Hissène Habré (Arabic: حسين حبري Ḥusaīn Ḥabrī, Chadian Arabic: pronounced [hiˈsɛn ˈhabre]; French pronunciation: [isɛn abʁe]; 13 August 1942 – 24 August 2021), also spelled Hissen Habré, was a Chadian politician and convicted war criminal who served as the fifth president of Chad from 1982 until he was deposed in 1990.

A member of the Toubou ethnic group from northern Chad, Habré joined FROLINAT rebels in the first Chadian Civil War against the southern-dominated Chadian government. Due to a rift with fellow rebel commander Goukouni Oueddei, Habré and his Armed Forces of the North rebel army briefly defected to Felix Malloum's government against Oueddei before turning against Malloum, who resigned in 1979. Habré was then given the position of Minister of Defense under Chad's new transitional coalition government, with Oueddei as President. Their alliance quickly collapsed, and Habré's forces overthrew Oueddei in 1982.

Having become the country's new president, Habré created the National Union for Independence and Revolution (UNIR) as the country's sole legal party in 1984. His dictatorship was notorious for widespread human rights abuses by his secret police, the Documentation and Security Directorate (DDS). He was brought to power with the support of France and the United States, who provided training, arms, and financing throughout his rule due to his opposition to Libyan leader Muammar Gaddafi. He led the country during the Libyan-Chadian conflict, culminating in victory during the Toyota War from 1986 to 1987 with French support. He was overthrown three years later in the 1990 Chadian coup d'état by Idriss Déby and fled into exile in Senegal.

In May 2016, Habré was found guilty of human-rights abuses, including rape, sexual slavery, and ordering the killing of 40,000 people by an international tribunal in Senegal in collaboration with the African Union and sentenced to life in prison. He was the first former head of state to be convicted for human rights abuses in the court of another nation. He died on 24 August 2021, after testing positive for COVID-19.

== Early life ==
Habré was born in 1942 in Faya-Largeau, northern Chad, then a colony of France, into a family of shepherds. He was a member of the Anakaza branch of the Daza Gourane ethnic group, which is itself a branch of the Toubou ethnic group. After primary schooling, he obtained a post in the French colonial administration, where he impressed his superiors and gained a scholarship to study in France at the Institute of Higher International Studies in Paris. He completed a university degree in political science in Paris, and returned to Chad in 1971. He also obtained several other degrees and earned his Doctorate from the Institute. After a further brief period of government service as a deputy prefect, he visited Tripoli and joined the National Liberation Front of Chad (FROLINAT) where he became a commander in the Second Liberation Army of FROLINAT along with Goukouni Oueddei. After Abba Siddick assumed the leadership of FROLINAT, the Second Liberation Army, first under Oueddei's command and then under Habré's, split from FROLINAT and became the Command Council of the Armed Forces of the North (CCFAN). In 1976 Oueddei and Habré quarreled and Habré split his newly named Armed Forces of the North (Forces Armées du Nord or FAN) from Goukouni's followers who adopted the name of People's Armed Forces (Forces Armées Populaires or FAP).

Habré first came to international attention when a group under his command attacked the town of Bardaï in Tibesti, on 21 April 1974, and took three Europeans hostage, with the intention of ransoming them for money and arms. The captives were a German physician, Christoph Staewen (whose wife Elfriede was killed in the attack), and two French citizens, Françoise Claustre, an archeologist, and Marc Combe, a development worker. Staewen was released on 11 June 1974 after significant payments by West German officials. Combe escaped in 1975, but despite the intervention of the French Government, Claustre (whose husband was a senior French government official) was not released until 1 February 1977. Habré split with Oueddei, partly over this hostage-taking incident (which became known as the "Claustre Affair" in France).

== Rise to power ==
In August 1978 Habré was given the posts of Prime Minister of Chad and Vice President of Chad as part of an alliance with Gen. Félix Malloum. However, the power-sharing alliance did not last long. In February 1979 Habré's forces and the national army under Malloum fought in N'Djamena. The fighting effectively left Chad without a national government. Several attempts were made by other nations to resolve the crisis, resulting in a new national government in November 1979 in which Habré was appointed Minister of Defense. However, fighting resumed within a matter of weeks. In December 1980 Habré was driven into exile in Sudan. In 1982 he resumed his fight against the Chadian government. FAN won control of N'Djamena in June and appointed Habré as head of state.

== Rule ==
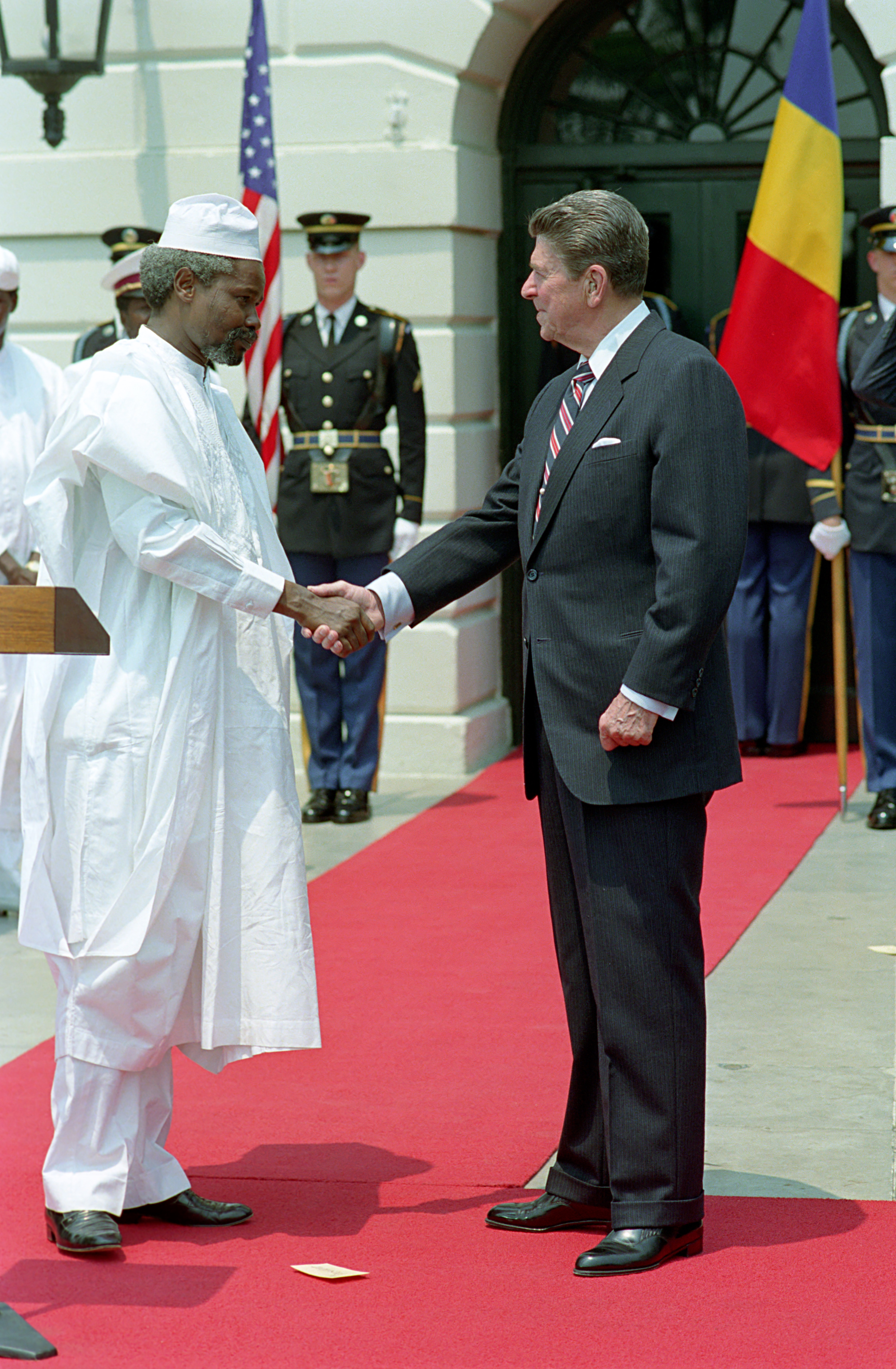
Ronald Reagan with Habré at the White House

Habré ruled Chad from 1982 until Idriss Déby deposed him in 1990. His one-party regime was characterized by widespread human rights abuses and atrocities. Habré denied killing and torturing tens of thousands of his opponents, although in 2012, the United Nations' International Court of Justice (ICJ) ordered Senegal to put him on trial or extradite him to face justice overseas.

Following his rise to power Habré created a secret police force known as the Documentation and Security Directorate (DDS), under which his opponents were tortured and executed. Some methods of torture commonly used by the DDS included burning the body of the detainee with incandescent objects, spraying gas into their eyes, ears and nose, forced swallowing of water, and forcing the mouths of detainees around the exhaust pipes of running automobiles. To track dissidents who had fled Chad, the DDS also collaborated with the Israeli, Central African, Togolese, Zairian, Ivorian and Cameroonian secret services, collectively known as the réseau mosaïque. Habré's government also periodically engaged in ethnic cleansing against groups such as the Sara, Hadjerai and Zaghawa, killing and arresting group members en masse when it was perceived that their leaders posed a threat to the regime.

Habré fled, with $11 million of public money, to Senegal after being overthrown in 1990. He was placed under house arrest in 2005 until his arrest in 2013. He was accused of war crimes and torture during his eight years in power in Chad, where rights groups say that some 40,000 people were killed under his rule. Human Rights Watch claims that 1,200 were killed and 12,000 were tortured, and a domestic Chadian commission of inquiry claims that as many as 40,000 were killed and that more than 200,000 were subjected to torture. Human Rights Watch later dubbed Habré "Africa's Pinochet."

== War with Libya ==
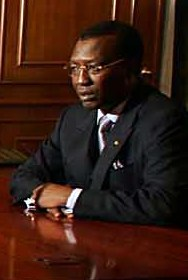
Idriss Deby, Habré's successor, who served as a commander during the Chadian-Libyan war, was killed four months before Habre's death.

Libya invaded Chad in July 1980, occupying and annexing the Aozou Strip. The United States and France responded by aiding Chad in an attempt to contain Libya's regional ambitions under Libyan leader Muammar al-Gaddafi.

In 1980, the unity government signed a treaty of friendship and cooperation with Libya. The treaty allowed the Chadian government to call on Libya for assistance if Chad's independence or internal security was threatened. The Libyan army was soon assisting the government forces, under Goukouni, and ousted FAN from much of northern Chad, including N'Djamena on 15 December. Libyan troops withdrew in November 1981. Without their support, Goukouni's government troops were weakened and Habré capitalized on this and his FAN militia entered N'Djamena on 7 June 1982. In 1983, Libyan troops returned to Chad and remained in the country, supporting Goukouni's militia, until 1988.

Despite this victory, Habré's government was weak, and strongly opposed by members of the Zaghawa ethnic group. A rebel offensive in November 1990, which was led by Idriss Déby, a Zaghawa former army commander who had participated in a plot against Habré in 1989 and subsequently fled to Sudan, defeated Habré's forces. The French chose not to assist Habré on this occasion, allowing him to be ousted; it is possible that they actively aided Déby. Explanation and speculation regarding the reasons for France's abandonment of Habré include the adoption of a policy of non-interference in intra-Chadian conflicts, dissatisfaction with Habré's unwillingness to move towards multiparty democracy, and favoritism by Habré towards U.S. rather than French companies with regard to oil development. Habré fled to Cameroon, and the rebels entered N'Djamena on 1 December 1990; Habré subsequently went into exile in Senegal.

== Support of the U.S. and France ==
In the 1980s, the United States was pivotal in bringing Hissène Habré to power, seeing him as a stalwart defense against expansion by Libya's Muammar Qaddafi, and therefore provided critical military support to his insurgency and then to his government, even as it committed widespread and systematic human rights violations—violations of which, as this report shows, many in the US government were aware.

— Human Rights Watch

The United States and France supported Habré, seeing him as a bulwark against the Gaddafi government in neighboring Libya. Under President Ronald Reagan, the United States gave covert CIA paramilitary support to help Habré take power and remained one of Habré's strongest allies throughout his rule, providing his regime with massive amounts of military aid. The United States also used a clandestine base in Chad to train captured Libyan soldiers whom it was organizing into an anti-Qaddafi force.

"The CIA was so deeply involved in bringing Habré to power I can't conceive they didn't know what was going on," said Donald Norland, U.S. ambassador to Chad from 1979 to 1981. "But there was no debate on the policy and virtually no discussion of the wisdom of doing what we did."

Documents obtained by Human Rights Watch show that the United States provided Habré's DDS with training, intelligence, arms, and other support despite knowledge of its atrocities. Records discovered in the DDS' meticulous archives describe training programs by U.S. instructors for DDS agents and officials, including a course in the United States that was attended by some of the DDS' most feared torturers. According to the Chadian Truth Commission, the United States also provided the DDS with monthly infusions of monetary aid and financed a regional network of intelligence networks code-named "Mosaic" that Chad used to pursue suspected opponents of Habré's regime even after they fled the country.

In the summer of 1983, when Libya invaded northern Chad and threatened to topple Habré, France sent paratroops with air support, while the Reagan administration provided two AWACS electronic surveillance planes to coordinate air cover. By 1987 Gaddafi's forces had retreated.

"Habré was a remarkably able man with a brilliant sense of how to play the outside world," a former senior U.S. official said. "He was also a bloodthirsty tyrant and torturer. It is fair to say we knew who and what he was and chose to turn a blind eye."

== Legal proceedings ==
=== Allegations of crimes against humanity ===
Human rights groups hold Habré responsible for the killing of thousands of people, but the exact number is unknown. Killings included massacres against ethnic groups in the south (1984), against the Hadjerai (1987), and against the Zaghawa (1989). Human Rights Watch charged him with having authorized tens of thousands of political murders and physical torture. Habré had been called "the African Pinochet," in reference to former Chilean dictator Augusto Pinochet. Habre would personally sign death warrants and oversee torture sessions, and was accused of personally participating in torture and rape. According to some leading experts, the tribunal that judges him constituted an "internationalized tribunal", even if it is the most 'national' within this category".

The government of Idriss Déby established a Commission of Inquiry into the Crimes and Misappropriations Committed by Ex-President Habré, His Accomplices and/or Accessories in 1990, which reported that 40,000 people had been killed, but did not follow up on its recommendations.

=== Initial trial attempts ===
Between 1993 and 2003, Belgium had universal jurisdiction legislation (the Belgian War Crimes Law) allowing the most serious violations of human rights to be tried in national as well as international courts, without any direct connection to the country of the alleged perpetrator, the victims or where the crimes took place. Despite the repeal of the legislation, investigations against Habré went ahead and in September 2005 he was indicted for crimes against humanity, torture, war crimes, and other human rights violations. Senegal, where Habré had been in exile for 17 years, had Habré under nominal house arrest in Dakar.

On 17 March 2006, the European Parliament demanded that Senegal turn over Habré to Belgium to be tried. Senegal did not comply, and it at first refused extradition demands from the African Union which arose after Belgium asked to try Habré. The Chadian Association for the Promotion and Defense of Human Rights expressed its approval of the decision. If he had been turned over, he would have become the first former dictator to be extradited by a third-party country to stand trial for human rights abuses. In 2007, Senegal set up its own special war-crimes court to try Habré under pressure from the African Union. On 8 April 2008, the National Assembly of Senegal voted to amend the nation's constitution to clear the way for Habré to be prosecuted in Senegal; Ibrahima Gueye was appointed trial coordinator in May 2008. A joint session of the National Assembly and the Senate voted in July 2008 to approve a bill empowering Senegalese courts to try people for crimes committed in other countries and for crimes that were committed more than ten years beforehand; this made it constitutionally possible to try Habré. Senegalese Minister of Justice Madicke Niang appointed four investigative judges on this occasion.

A 2007 movie by director Klaartje Quirijns, The Dictator Hunter, tells the story of the activists Souleymane Guengueng and Reed Brody who led the efforts to bring Habré to trial.

=== Trial in Chad ===
On 15 August 2008, a Chadian court sentenced Habré to death in absentia for war crimes and crimes against humanity in connection with allegations that he had worked with rebels inside Chad to oust Déby. François Serres, a lawyer for Habré, criticized this trial on 22 August for unfairness and secrecy. According to Serres, the accusation on which the trial was based was previously unknown and Habré had not received any notification of the trial. 14 victims filed new complaints with a Senegalese prosecutor on 16 September, accusing Habré of crimes against humanity and torture.

=== Trial in Senegal ===
The Senegalese government added an amendment in 2008, which would allow Habré to be tried in court. Senegal later changed their position, however, requesting 27 million euros in funding from the international community before going through with the trial. This prompted Belgium to pressure the International Court of Justice (ICJ) to force Senegal to either extradite Habré to Belgium or to proceed with the trial. The ICJ declined to force extradition, finding that prosecution is an international obligation the violation of which is a wrongful act engaging the responsibility of the State, while extradition is an option offered to the State. Senegal was found to have failed international obligations by 1.) failing to make immediately a preliminary inquiry into the fact relating to the alleged crimes; and 2.) failing to submit the case to its competent authorities for prosecution (obligations according to UN Convention on Torture and Other Cruel, inhuman or Degrading Treatment or Punishment (1984) that Senegal had bound itself to). The ICJ rejected Senegal Defenses of insufficient funds and opposition by domestic law, instead unanimously ordering Senegal to submit the case to authorities for prosecution or extradite him without delay.

In November 2010, the court of justice of the Economic Community of West African States (ECOWAS) ruled that Senegal could not hold trial in the matter through local court only, and asked for the creation of a special tribunal on the matter of Habré's prosecution. In April 2011, after initial reticence, Senegal agreed to the creation of an ad hoc tribunal in collaboration with the African Union, the Chadian state and with international funding.

Senegal changed their position again however, walking out during discussions on establishing the court on 30 May 2011 without explanation. The African union commission on Habré, in preparation for their next summit on 30 June, published a report which urged pressing Senegal to extradite Habré to Belgium.

On 8 July 2011, Senegalese officials announced that Habré would be extradited to Chad on 11 July, but this was subsequently halted. In July 2012, the ICJ ruled that Senegal must start Habré's trial "without delay". Amnesty International called on Senegal to abide by the ICJ's ruling, calling it "a victory for victims that's long overdue". A trial by the International Criminal Court (ICC) was ruled out, because the crimes took place before the ICC was fully established in 2002, and its jurisdiction is limited to events that took place after that date.

In December 2012, the Parliament of Senegal passed a law allowing for the creation of an international tribunal in Senegal to try Habre. The judges of the tribunal would be appointed by the African Union, and come from elsewhere in Africa.

On 30 June 2013, Habré was arrested in Senegal by the Senegalese police. Chadian President Idriss Déby said of his arrest that it was a step towards "an Africa free of all evil, an Africa stripped of all dictatorships." Senegal's court, set up with the African Union, charged him with crimes against humanity and torture. That year he was also sentenced to death in absentia for crimes against humanity by a Chadian court. The tribunal that judged Hissène Habré in Senegal has been described as "neither an exclusively international nor a solely national tribunal, but an internationalised tribunal", with an ambitious and innovative approach to justice.

On 20 July 2015 the trial started. Waiting for the trial to open, Habré shouted: "Down with imperialists. [The trial] is a farce by rotten Senegalese politicians. African traitors. Valet of America". After that Habré was taken out of the courtroom and the trial began without him. On 21 July 2015 Habré's trial was postponed to 7 September 2015, after his lawyers refused to participate in court.

=== Conviction by the Special Tribunal in Senegal ===
On 30 May 2016, the Extraordinary African Chambers found Habré guilty of rape, sexual slavery, and ordering the killing of 40,000 people during his tenure as Chadian president and sentenced him to life in prison in the Prison du Cap Manuel in Senegal. The verdict marked the first time an African Union-backed court convicted a former ruler for human-rights abuses and the first time that the courts of one country have prosecuted the former ruler of another country for crimes against humanity. In May 2017, Judge Ougadeye Wafi upheld Habre's life sentence and all convictions against him, except rape. The court emphasized this was a procedural matter, as the facts the victim offered during her testimony came too late in the proceedings to be included within charges of mass sexual violence committed by his security agents, the convictions for which were upheld. On 7 April 2020, a judge in Senegal granted Habre two months' leave from prison, as the jail is being used to hold new detainees in COVID-19 quarantine. After finishing his home freedom he returned to prison on 7 June.

== Death ==
Habré died in Senegal on 24 August 2021, a week after his 79th birthday, after being hospitalized in Dakar's main hospital with COVID-19. He had fallen ill while in jail a week earlier. In a statement, Habré's wife, Fatimé Raymonne Habré, confirmed that he had COVID-19. He is buried in Yoff Muslim cemetery.

== See also ==
- Rose Lokissim
