= Goukouni Oueddei =

President of Chad from 1979 to 1982

- كوكوني عويدي
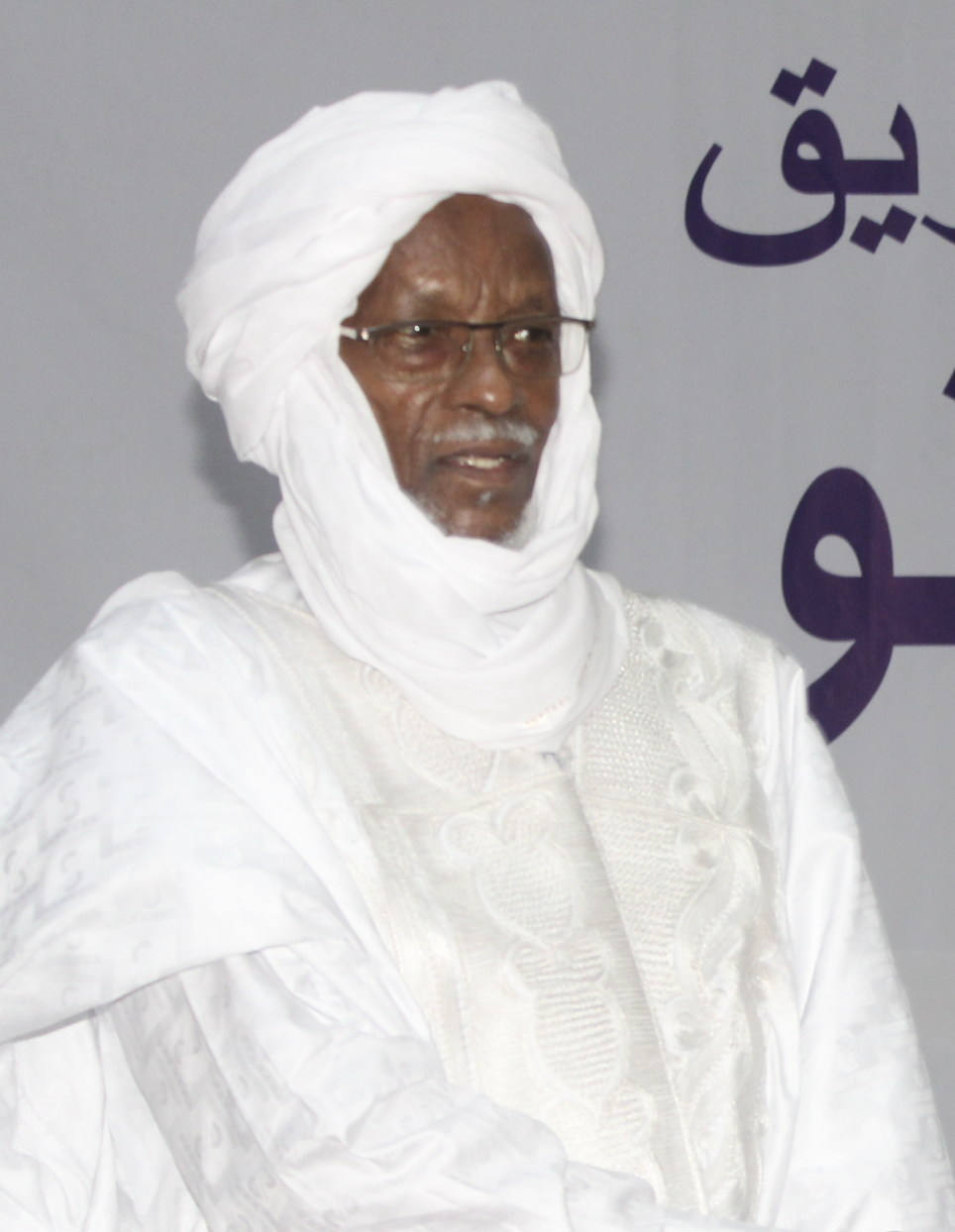

4th President of Chad
- In office 3 September 1979 – 7 June 1982
- Prime Minister: Djidingar Dono Ngardoum
- Vice President: Wadel Abdelkader Kamougué
- Preceded by: Lol Mahamat Choua
- Succeeded by: Hissène Habré
- Acting; 23 March 1979 – 29 April 1979
- Vice President: Vacant
- Preceded by: Félix Malloum
- Succeeded by: Lol Mahamat Choua

Personal details
- Born: 1944 (age 81–82) Zouar, French Equatorial Africa (present-day Chad)
- Party: FROLINAT

Goukouni Oueddei (Arabic: كوكوني عويدي Kūkūnī ʿWaīday; born 1944) is a Chadian politician who served as the fourth president of Chad from 1979 until he was deposed in a coup in 1982. He previously served in this role as acting president from March to April 1979.

A northerner, Goukouni commanded FROLINAT rebels with Libyan support during the first Chadian Civil War against Chad's southern-dominated government. Upon the rebel victory and the resignation of President Felix Malloum in 1979, he became the new president of Chad's new transitional coalition government by the terms of the Lagos Accord, with rival fellow rebel commander Hissène Habré as defense minister.

Goukouni pursued a pro-Libya policy; continued differences with Habré, who opposed Libya, led to him being overthrown by Habré's forces in 1982. He then became the foremost opponent to Habré's new government, and fought against him during the Libyan-Chadian conflict as a Libyan-backed rebel leader. In 1985, due to a supposed rift with his Libyan allies, he went into exile.

== Biography ==
Goukouni is from the northern half of the country and is the son of Oueddei Kichidemi, derde of the Teda. He entered politics in the late 1960s as a militant in the National Liberation Front of Chad (FROLINAT) led by Abba Siddick. FROLINAT resented the political dominance enjoyed by southerners under the presidency of François Tombalbaye and advocated the participation of central and northern peoples. After Tombalbaye's assassination in 1975, tensions between the two geographical halves of the country escalated into a convoluted civil war that involved several Chadian political groups, Libya, the United States, and France. The conflict lasted through the 1980s. Goukouni viewed the dictatorial Tombalbaye regime as an instrument of continued French hegemony in Chad.

== President ==
Goukouni was installed as interim Chadian head of state on 23 March 1979. He was acclaimed President of the Transitional Government of National Unity (GUNT), which sought reconciliation between warring factions, on 10 November 1979. Goukouni, a Cold War neutralist who supported Libya, was Head of State; Wadel Abdelkader Kamougué (a southern moderate) was Vice President; Hissène Habré (a pro-West northerner) was Minister of Defence; and Acyl Ahmat (a strongly pro-Libyan Arab) was Minister of Foreign Affairs.

Personal rivalries (especially between erstwhile allies Goukouni and Habré) limited the government's effectiveness and contributed to the perception of Goukouni as an indecisive puppet of Libyan leader Muammar Gaddafi. There was even a Libyan proposal to annex Chad, which drew opposition from all ideological camps. In a last-ditch attempt to salvage his beleaguered government, Goukouni appointed Djidingar Dono Ngardoum as prime minister on 19 May 1982. The GUNT was, however, overthrown by Habré loyalists on 7 June 1982. Goukouni fled from N'Djamena across the Chari River into Cameroon; he subsequently went into exile in Tripoli, Libya. Acyl died in an unrelated accident, and Kamougué lost much of his base as Habré consolidated his power into a centralized military dictatorship.

== With Libya ==
By 1983, Goukouni returned to Chad with substantial Libyan assistance to fight the Habré régime through guerrilla warfare. He was the most recognized Chadian oppositionist, whose views carried significant weight, though Habré granted only limited concessions in an attempt to reconcile with Goukouni. The former president reportedly demanded a new constitution and liberalization of political party activity, to which Habré did not accede.

He was placed under house arrest in August 1985 in Tripoli when the Libyan government disapproved his intentions of negotiating a truce with Habré. In October 1985, Libyan police arrested Goukouni, and in the process they shot him in the stomach. He then broke with the Libyans and went into exile in Algiers instead in February 1987. However, some questioned whether he had truly broken with the Libyans, and in July 1987 he said that he was on good terms with them.

Goukouni met with Chadian President Idriss Déby on 17 April 2007 in Libreville, Gabon, to discuss ways to end the Second Chadian Civil War. Saying that Chad was in grave danger, Goukouni expressed a hope that he could use his "moral authority" to save it. He said that in turn he wanted to be allowed to return to Chad from exile in the future, and he said that Déby had agreed to that. On 19 April, the leaders of two rebel groups rejected Goukouni's offer to mediate.

Goukouni returned to Chad on 30 July 2007, along with about twenty other exiled opponents of the regime, for a discussion with Déby regarding the rebellion and how to resolve the situation. Goukouni and the others left Chad and returned to Libreville later on the same day.

He met with Nigerien President Mamadou Tandja on 4 March 2008, discussing the situation in Chad following the February 2008 Battle of N'Djamena.

In 2013 his youngest child, Saadie Goukouni Weddeye, was appointed to the Chadian government as Minister of Social Action.

== Special envoy ==
Amidst the 2015 Burundian unrest, central African leaders, including Déby, designated Goukouni as special envoy to the Great Lakes region on 25 May 2015 in order to help resolve the situation in Burundi.

Political offices
Preceded by Félix Malloum	Head of State of Chad; 1979	Succeeded by Lol Mahamat Choua
Preceded by Lol Mahamat Choua	Head of State of Chad; 1979–1982	Succeeded by Hissène Habré
