= Claustre Affair =

Hostage crisis during the First Chadian Civil War

The Claustre Affair was a hostage crisis during the First Chadian Civil War. Chadian rebels, calling themselves the Command Council of the Armed Forces of the North (CCFAN), led by Hissène Habré kidnapped Françoise Claustre, a French archaeologist, Marc Combe, a worker in a French development organization in Chad, and Christoph Staewen, a German doctor. Although Combe escaped and Staewen was ransomed back by the West German government, the rebels demanded a ransom of 10 million francs for Mrs. Claustre and her husband Pierre, who was later also captured by the rebels. The case garnered international attention, with the French sending a negotiator who was later executed. Finally the French appealed to Muammar Gaddafi to free the hostages, which he then did. The affair showcased Libya's growing influence in Central Africa.

== Background ==
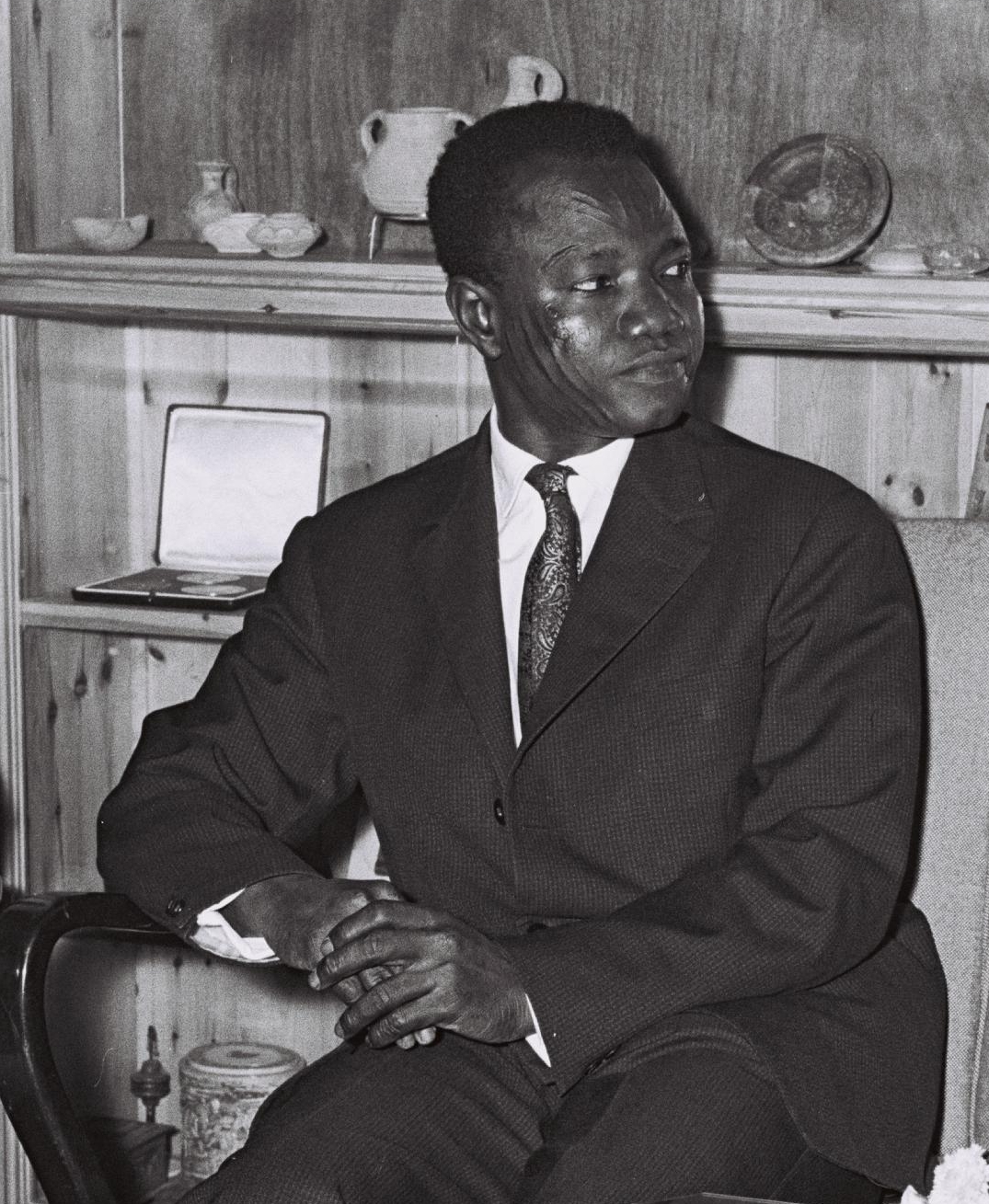
François Tombalbaye, Chadian independence leader

Chad gained its independence from France in 1960, but the majority of French-educated Chadians came from the south of the country, so people from southern Chad had more power in the new government than the northerners. Although the French continued to hold on to the Borkou-Ennedi-Tibesti Prefecture, the northern part of Chad, until 1965, the lack of power for northern Chad escalated tensions between the two parts of the country. In 1966, a rebel group was formed, the Front for National Liberation of Chad, or FROLINAT, that began an insurgency in northern Chad against the post-independence government of François Tombalbaye. By 1967, the rebellion had spread to much of the country, particularly northern and eastern Chad.

Like most of France's former colonies, Chad had signed a secret agreement with France allowing for French assistance in "domestic maintenance of order", which stated that Chad could request France to take direct military action against an internal rebellion. However, this also meant that the French gained command of all Chadian military forces for the duration of the suppression. By late 1969, the government had lost several important battles against FROLINAT, and appealed to French president Charles de Gaulle to crush the insurgents. DeGaulle approved the move to help the Chadian government, if they allowed France to set up a Mission de réforme administrative (MRA), headed by Pierre Claustre, to reform the Chadian government to stop a future uprising. Tombalbaye acceded to the request, and de Gaulle deployed 2,800 troops and around 600 'advisors' to Chad.

The French-led coalition managed to destroy most FROLINAT groups in an operation that took around 10,000 lives, but many rebel groups managed to survive, especially in the Borkou-Ennedi-Tibesti Region. In addition, the MRA did not complete its mission to change the government of Chad, essentially setting Chad up for another rebellion for the same reason as the original.

== Kidnapping ==
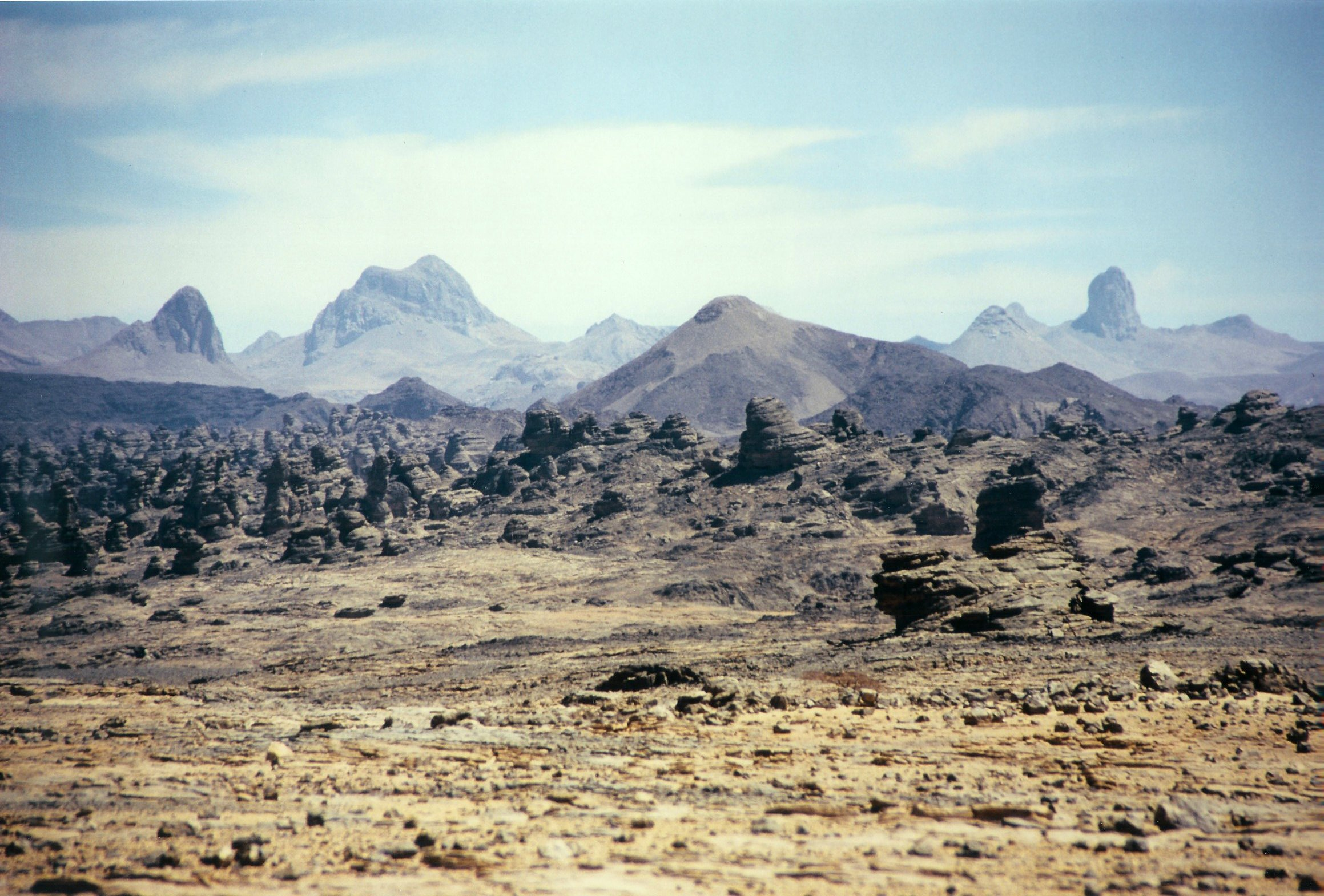
The Tibesti Mountains east of Bardaï, where the hostages were kidnapped

On the night of 12 April 1974, the CCFAN led by Hissène Habré attacked the northern Chadian town of Bardaï. Auxiliary troops, gardes nomades, helped the group kidnap Marc Combe, an MRA worker, Françoise Claustre, a French archaeologist, as well as Christoph Staewen, a German doctor providing medical treatment for locals. Staewen's wife was killed in the crossfire. The rebels loaded three cars they found on the site with food and other supplies, including Combe's radio, put the hostages in, and drove off. The Chadian garrison attempted to respond but was unable to pursue the rebels in the darkness of the desert.

In N'Djamena, Françoise's husband Pierre, head of the MRA, heard of the kidnapping and flew the 770 kilometres (480 mi) to Faya-Largeau, capital of Borkou-Ennedi-Tibesti Prefecture, from where he hoped to go to Bardaï to learn more. Over the next few weeks, Pierre was the only person who contacted the kidnappers often, as the French ambassador Fernand Wibaux had just left, and his replacement, Raphaël Touze, would not arrive until 27 April. In addition, the French president, Georges Pompidou, had just died, and there would be no centralizing policy anchor until after the general election on 19 May.

== Initial negotiations ==
Tombalbaye ordered reinforcements to Bardaï, but both Pierre Claustre and the Chadian prefect in Faya-Largeau thought that the rebels would execute the hostages in response to a military buildup. Luc Baldit, the French chargé d'affaires in N'Djamena, was ordered to not provide support to a Chadian military operation that could endanger the lives of the hostages in any way.

Already, two West German envoys had arrived in Chad to negotiate with the hostages. The French were sending Robert Puissant, a high-ranking official, to be their negotiator, but it would take time for him to arrive. Franz Wallner, one of the German envoys, joined Pierre Claustre in Bardaï. On the morning of 10 May, Habré and his CCFAN published their demands:

- The release of 32 political prisoners in N'Djamena
- The publication of a CCFAN political manifesto
- An 'indemnity' for the property of the local populations, especially the villages, palm groves, crops, and other goods that Habré claimed French and Chadian forces had destroyed during the civil war

The demands were difficult for the French to accept, and put them in a tight spot. The new French ambassador to Chad, Raphäel Touze, feared that the demands were specific enough to France's problems in the region that West Germany would go it alone and negotiate only for Staewen. In addition, by demanding that France release prisoners held by another government, Habré was straining the relationship between the French and Chadian governments. Since releasing the prisoners was not something Tombalbaye wanted to do, French policymakers wanted to go about negotiations in a way that would not undermine the authority of the Chadian government. Some Chadian officials, including the prefect of Borkou-Ennedi-Tibesti, wanted to stop any direct contact between the CCFAN and the French and German negotiators.

Franz Wallner, the German negotiator, met his French counterpart Robert Puissant and the French ambassador Touze in N'Djamena. They agreed to coordinate a negotiation strategy, but told the French that they would negotiate separately while the CCFAN maintained its demands for a prisoner release, as the West German government had no involvement in that aspect. The Germans had offered to broadcast a CCFAN manifesto over Deutsche Welle in French and Arabic for 3 days, and to pay an indemnity of 50 million CFA francs for the damages Habré stated. It seemed that Habré had accepted the offer in principle. The Germans also urged Touze and Puissant to keep the liberation of the hostages secret from the Tombalbaye government, which would be infuriated about the broadcast of an anti-government manifesto over German radio and a large ransom payment to the CCFAN, so the French and Germans planned to fly directly from Bardaï to Tunis before the Tombalbaye government could react.

The French began to pressure Tombalbaye to release the prisoners. Although Puissant said that the release of political prisoners was something controlled only by the Tombalbaye government, he feared that inaction on the part of Chad would stop any chance of the hostages being released. He was correct; Chad refused to release the prisoners, but seemed willing to fulfill the other two conditions that the rebels gave.

== Release of Staewen ==
On 18 May 1974, both Robert Puissant and Franz Wallner met with Habré at the village of Zouï 12 km (7.5 mi) east of Bardaï. Habré demanded 1 billion CFA franc (around $2 million today) in addition to his other demands. The next day, Wallner officially accepted Habré's demands in Zouï. After two days, the negotiators again returned to Zouï to finalize negotiations, during which, according to Pierre Claustre, Puissant threatened Habré that "terrible reprisals would fall upon the populations of Tibesti" if any of the hostages was executed. On 26 May 1974, Chadian soldiers began burning the homes of the gardes nomades who defected to the CCFAN, and later on that evening set fire to the local palm grove.

The French government sent in a former ambassador to Chad who had good relations with Tombalbaye to try and get a prisoner release. Tombalbaye seemed to agree, but on 2 June, he gave an inflammatory speech in which he demanded that the rebels release the hostages before getting the prisoners. He threatened Habré's family, and indeed Chadian forces had captured 60 of his relatives, including his mother and son. Pierre Claustre even heard they were transported on French aircraft.

Even with these issue, Habré still released Christoph Staewen in exchange for the broadcast of the manifesto and 4 million French francs. The Germans took Staewen to Libya to avoid Chadian authorities. Later, Chad broke diplomatic relations with West Germany and declared Pierre Claustre, who had already left for France, a persona non grata. In order to resolve this, the French appointed Pierre Galopin, a French Commandant, to accompany Consul General Georges Estrade in negotiations. Pierre Galopin had previously served as deputy to Camille Gourvenec, head of Tombalbaye's intelligence service, a service that committed torture and other abuses against detainees. Galopin also led 1969 negotiations that caused large parts of FROLINAT to defect to the government. As his brother had died fighting these defectors, Goukouni Oueddei, the co-leader of the CCFAN, held a special grudge against Galopin, while Galopin himself believed he had some rapport with Goukouni.

== Stalled negotiations and new regime ==
In July, Habre reopened negotiations, leading the French to believe Habre approved of Galopin as a negotiator. During a meeting on 4 August, Habre arrested Galopin, later informing the French they had planned to arrest him for many weeks due to his involvement in the previous Chadian war. Goukouni later also accused Galopin of attempting to stir dissent in rebel ranks, an assertion supported by orders Gourvenec had sent him to gather information on the rebels. The rebels now demanded that 600 million of the 1 billion CFA francs they were owed should take the form of weapons, which they needed. This led to an impasse in negotiations, while Claustre secretly reentered Chad and convinced Habre to mollify his demands. The rebels now offered to release Combe and Francoise Claustre in exchange for a third of the ransom money and release of 10 political prisoners.

In response to Habre's threat to execute Galopin, the French sent Puissant again to meet with Habre. By January 1975, Puissant and Habre agreed on the conditions, substituting supplies and vehicles for the ransom demands. Tombalbaye refused to accept the deal unless Galopin was released first, claiming he suffered mistreatment despite French insistence. The rebels then threatened to execute Galopin on 4 April if their demands were not met. According to Goukouni the rebels had received a threatening note that day from Bardai threatening destruction if they killed Galopin. This threat compelled the rebels, who had been reluctant to execute Galopin, to hang him. This version of events is not in French archives, but Touze's dirary records him sending a message to Bardai the night earlier ordering them to remind Habre of serious consequences if they should execute Galopin. The execution led the French to reduce the terms of the deal, while Puissant indicated Claustre could find an arms dealer to supply weapons to the rebels.

On 13 April, military officers staged a coup-d'etat against Tombalbaye and killed him. The new president, Felix Malloum, had been on Habre's list of prisoners, and the new government, the Conseil Supérieur Militaire (CSM), arrested members of the old regime and attempted to reconcile with the FRONILAT factions. Habre, however, remained obstinate, but dropped the demand for a prisoner release. In April, Combe, who had been the rebels' mechanic and chauffeur, escaped. In May 1975, Stephane Hessel, an official in France's Cooperation Ministry, became the new lead negotiator, and now offered less to Habre due to the escape of a hostage. On 14 July, Hessel informed Habre and other FAN fighters that Claustre was delivering the weapons to a rebel stronghold in Yebi-Bou. Claustre, during this time, had been sounding out potential arms dealers in France and returned to Chad with filmmaker Raymond Depardon and a photographer. Claustre delivered the weapons from Ghana, but when they arrived the rebels became furious when they realised the weapons, mainly light submachine guns, were largely useless for their mode of fighting and were worth far less than they were led to believe. When the Nigerien authorities discovered the crashed plane carrying the journalists on their return journey, they impounded it and deported its passengers, which revealed to the Chadian government that the French were arming the rebels behind their back. They now told the French that any hostage release would come as part of a political settlement.

Claustre soon returned to France, and returned with Depardon. Depardon conducted an interview with Francois Claustre, broadcast on TFI, which provoked massive public outcry and forced the French government to act. On 22 August, while Depardon returned to France, the rebels decided to keep Pierre Claustre as well as a hostage. On 25 August, the French delivered several million francs to the CCFAN and later airdropped supplies. A furious CSM accused France of violating Chadian sovereignty, and gave French forces a month to evacuate. As the last French units were pulling out, the Chadian government attacked Zoui, an attack in which Pierre Claustre accused the government of murdering 60 villagers in cold blood. Although the French would later make up with the Chadian government, this had no impact on their efforts to free the Claustres.

== Libyan involvement and release ==
The French then turned to Libya. Since his arrival to power in 1969, Muammar Gaddafi had begun to see Chad as under Libya's zone of influence. Notably in 1973 Libya occupied the Aouzou Strip, an area of internationally-recognized Chadian territory extending 150 kilometers south of border. The FAN had used Libyan territory as a rear base and FRONILAT had headquarters in Tripoli, but the CCFAN had serious disagreements with the Secretary-General of FRONILAT and so received limited Libyan support. However, after relations between Libya and FRONILAT deteriorated, Libyan intelligence started feeling out the CCFAN, sent them some weapons, and promised training. Habre continued to be opposed to Libyan influence, while Goukouni believed the focus of the rebels should be on Chad. A meeting to resolve the dispute between the two men in September 1976 instead turned to a permanent estrangement, with Habre forming his own rebel group under the name FAN and leaving the area.

Without Habre as a co-partner, Goukouni began to seek a more profitable relationship with Libya, but Gaddafi refused to give much aid until the Claustres were released. In 1976, the Chadians began to learn France was negotiating with Libya for releasing the hostages. Until the Claustres' release, France continued to assure Chad that no negotiations happened with the rebels. At the end of January 1977, Goukouni released the Claustres to the Libyan embassy in Tripoli. A later report in Le Monde claimed Libya had provided 5 million francs as well as 100 Kalashnikovs and 100 thousand rounds of ammunition, while French records indicate Gaddafi provided much more aid than this to the rebels. The French government attempted to calm a furious Malloum, but the CSM stil publicly denounced France's role in the hostages' release and accused them of violating Chad's sovereignty.
