= Outel Bono =

Chadian political figure

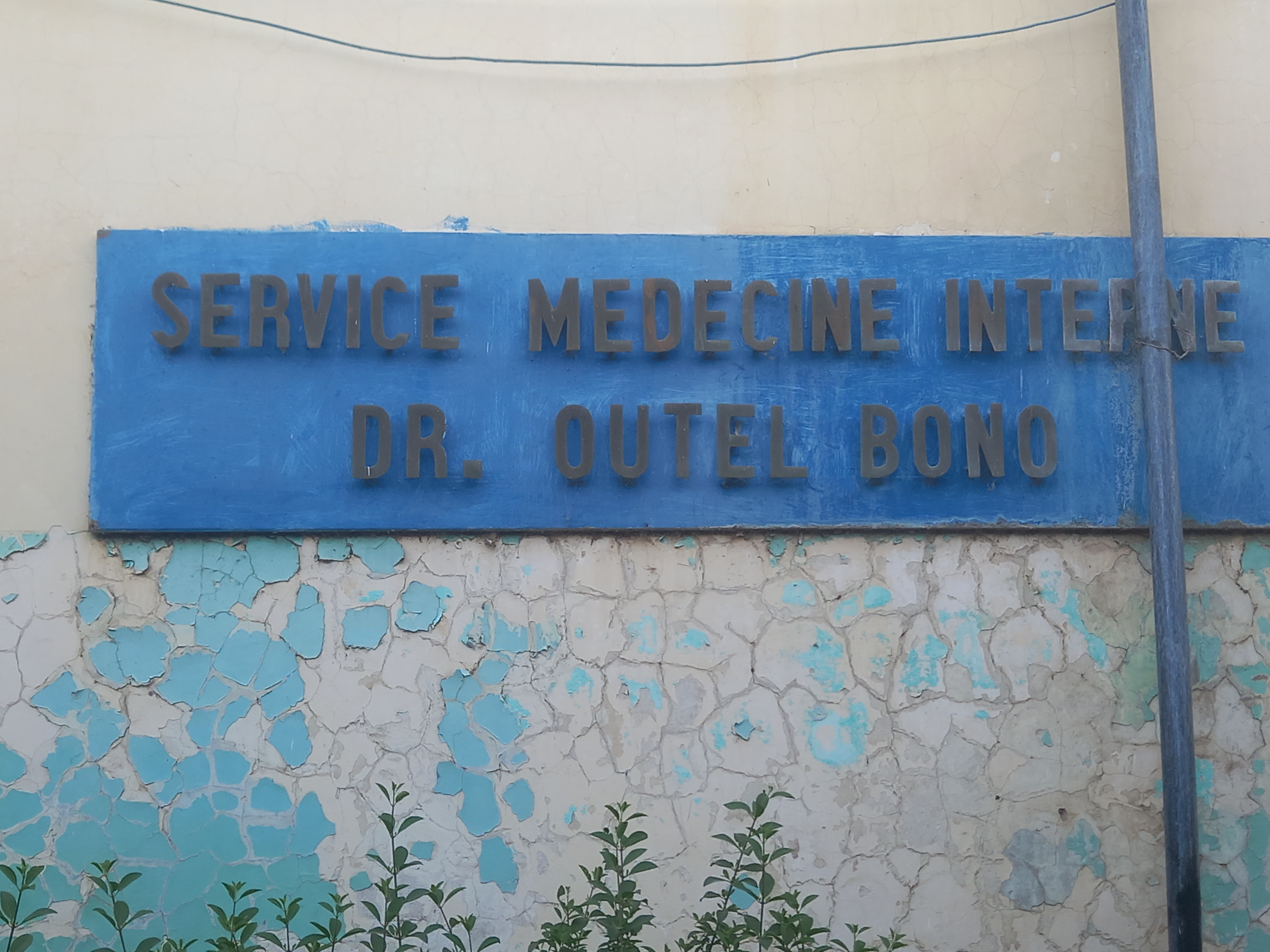
Internal Medicine Department, University Hospital of Rouen Normandy (CHU-RN), Outel Bono

Outel Bono (Fort Archambauld, 8 December 1934 – Paris, 26 August 1973) was a Chadian medical doctor and politician. Inspired by Marxist and anti-colonialist thinking, Bono's views have been described as a "third way" between the pro-French regime of strongman François Tombalbaye and the anti-government rebels. A prominent dissident, he was assassinated in 1973 by a French agent working for Tombalbaye and the latter's French adviser Camille Gourvennec, possibly in cooperation with the broader French secret services.

== Biography ==
Outel Bono was born to a southern Chadian family in 1934. From 1945 onwards, he lived in France, then still the country's colonial power, and was schooled in Bordeaux among other places. In 1952, he met his future wife, Nadine Bono (née Dauch), in Cahors. They would marry in 1959 and have three children, named Mariame, Daimane and Tarik.

While studying medicine in Toulouse during the 1950s, Bono was politicized by contacts with other young African students and became a member of the leftist FEANF. He would maintain this activist engagement for the rest of his life. As he lived in Tunisia between 1959 and 1961, Bono maintained contacts with Algerian nationalists and went on a visit to Maoist China with the FEANF.

Bono returned to Chad in 1962. In 1963, after partaking in a government-sponsored conference to outline the future of Chad, he quickly became wary of the growing authoritarianism of President François Tombalbaye, who by then had transformed the country into a one-party state. On 24 March 1963, he was arrested on concocted charges for plotting against the government, alongside about twenty others including Abbo Nassour and Ali Kosso. Condemned to death, his sentence was commuted after a vigorous campaign led by the French Communist Party in which his wife Nadine was active. He was reprieved in 1965 and was able to resume his medical career. Tombalbaye even appointed him Director (i.e. chief civil servant) of the Chadian Health Ministry in an attempt to co-opt his political power.

He served as a doctor in Abéché and subsequently in Fort-Lamy (now N'Djamena) between 1965 and 1969. In May 1969, one day after he partook in a cultural conference where subversive sentiments were voiced, Bono was again arrested and condemned to five years of forced labour. However, he was amnestied after two months. In 1972, Bono left Chad and went to Paris, where he joined the exiled political opposition. He announced a press conference to launch a new political party, the Mouvement Démocratique de Rénovation Tchadienne (MDRT). Although Bono's new party eschewed violence, some cadres of the FROLINAT allegedly considered joining it.

=== Assassination and aftermath ===
Two days before the planned press conference, on 26 August 1973, Bono was assassinated in broad daylight in the Rue de la Roquette, situated in the 11th arrondissement of Paris. He was killed by two shots from a 9 mm revolver as he climbed into his car, after which the assassin fled with his own car.

In May 1975, rebel leader Hissène Habré shared the recording of a confession by the recently executed French officer Pierre Galopin with a reporter from Le Figaro, Thierry Desjardins. Galopin stated in this confession that he knew Bono's assassin to be a certain Léon Hardy, who had been a bodyguard of Central African dictator Bokassa and who was a friend of Tombalbaye's French security chief Camille Gourvennec.

In December 1977, he police investigation found strong indications that the true identity of Hardy was a certain Claude Bocquel, whom they localized in southern France. Bocquel had been a bodyguard of both Bokassa and Omar Bongo, had ties to Gourvennec, admitted to using the pseudonym "Léonardy", and had received a sum of 200.000 francs in 1974. The police also discovered a revolver and a car in his home which corresponded to testimonies from the assassination and found out that there were holes in Bocquel's alibi. Moreover, despite denying that he was the killer, Bocquel added that he would have assassinated Bono if Gourvennec or the French authorities had asked him to do so.

The investigators further found out that Bocquel had initially helped Bokassa to establish FROLINAT training camps in 1969, when the Central African strongman was embroiled in conflict with Tombalbaye. In March 1970, he had been expelled by Bokassa after the French discovered these camps, then arrested by Gourvennec during a layover in Chad. After a "rough interrogation" by Gourvennec and Galopin, Bocquel confessed his aid to FROLINAT and agreed to start working for the Chadian secret services.

However, the evidence against Bocquel was considered insufficient to prosecute him. The file was closed in April 1982 by the investigating magistrate. Nadine Bono tried to have the case reopened, but her appeal to the Court of Cassation was rejected in December 1983. Additionally, she was forced to pay the legal costs because the court claimed a premeditated assassination had not been proven. Meanwhile, Gourvennec had returned to France, but died in 1978 in suspicious circumstances; the intelligence agent Maurice Robert believed him to have been poisoned.

The Outel Bono case has been cited as an example of the web of secret links between powerful people in France and its former African colonies, named the Françafrique by authors and publicists including François-Xavier Verschave. The case was further examined by historians, most notably Jean-Pierre Bat. According to historian Nathaniel Powell, the role of Gourvennec and the Chadian regime in Bono's killing has been established through "clear evidence", whereas the involvement of the broader French authorities and secret services remains a matter of debate.

Nadine Bono died in 2015.
