= Camille Gourvennec =

Officer in the French external intelligence service SDECE

- Died: December 1978; Paris
- Military career
- Branch: SDECE (France)
- Rank: Colonel
- Commands: Nomad and National Guard

Camille Gourvennec (died December 1978) was an officer of the French external intelligence service SDECE, possibly with the rank of colonel, who, from 1963, was seconded as security adviser to President François Tombalbaye of Chad, and was therefore effectively head of Tombalbaye's security and intelligence service. In this capacity, he was responsible for the arrest and harsh interrogation of dissidents, as well as being implicated in the 1973 assassination of Outel Bono. He had previously served with the French forces in Algeria. It has been alleged that he was a key member of the Françafrique network, led by Jacques Foccart.

== Biography ==
=== Activities in Chad ===
Gourvennec was employed in Chad in the 1960s. From 1963 onwards, he was director of the Bureau de coordination et de synthèse du renseignement (BCSR), the feared secret police of Chadian strongman François Tombalbaye. The BCSR had first started as a Chadian extension of the French SDECE. It later acquired more autonomy, but Gourvennec remained in contact with the SDECE through Maurice Robert.

His tenure also oversaw the Civil War, in which France intervened through Opération Bison and Opération Limousin. A veteran of the Indochinese and Algerian wars, Gourvennec employed violent tactics against suspected FROLINAT members and sympathizers among the population.

In his capacity as security chief, he is believed to have been personally involved in the interrogation (under torture) of numerous opponents of Tombalbaye's regime. Gourvennec was also implicated in the killing of dissidents, most notably Outel Bono who was assassinated in Paris in 1973. The likely assassin, Claude Bocquel, was a former bodyguard of both Jean-Bédel Bokassa and Omar Bongo who had been enlisted into the Chadian secret services by Gourvennec from 1970 onwards. According to historian Nathaniel Powell, the role of Gourvennec and the Chadian regime in Bono's killing has been established through "clear evidence", whereas the involvement of the broader French authorities and the SDECE remains a matter of debate.

His deputy and close collaborator was Commandant Pierre Galopin. The latter was taken hostage and executed in 1975 by Hissène Habré during the Claustre Affair after he had been sent to negotiate the release of Françoise Claustre. It is likely that Gourvennec had pressured Tombalbaye to send Galopin as an envoy. However, his closeness to Gourvennec and the fact Goukouni Oueddei held Galopin responsible for the death of his brother Mahamat Oueddeï-mi (Galopin had been involved in a botched March 1969 operation to entirely liquidate the Oueddei family) made him highly unfit to negotiate successfully with the rebels and contributed to his capture and execution.

Gourvennec also commanded Chad's Nomad and National Guard. He may have had advance warning of the 1975 coup which toppled Tombalbaye, but he did not intervene. One of the reasons Gourvennec's involvement or tacit assent is suspected is that he was maintained in his post by the new military regime of Félix Malloum. This would have been unlikely without his complicity, although Gourvennec denied all foreknowledge.

=== Demise and death ===
In late August 1978, Habré became prime minister of Chad in the Malloum government. Habré demanded that Gourvennec quit the country, which he did. In December 1978, Gourvennec was found dead in a pool of blood in his Paris apartment. While his death was officially ruled a consequence of throat cancer, Maurice Robert and Jacques Foccart believed him to have been poisoned.
