= Boubacar Boris Diop =

Senegalese novelist (born 1946)

Boubacar Boris Diop Bubakar Bóris Jóob
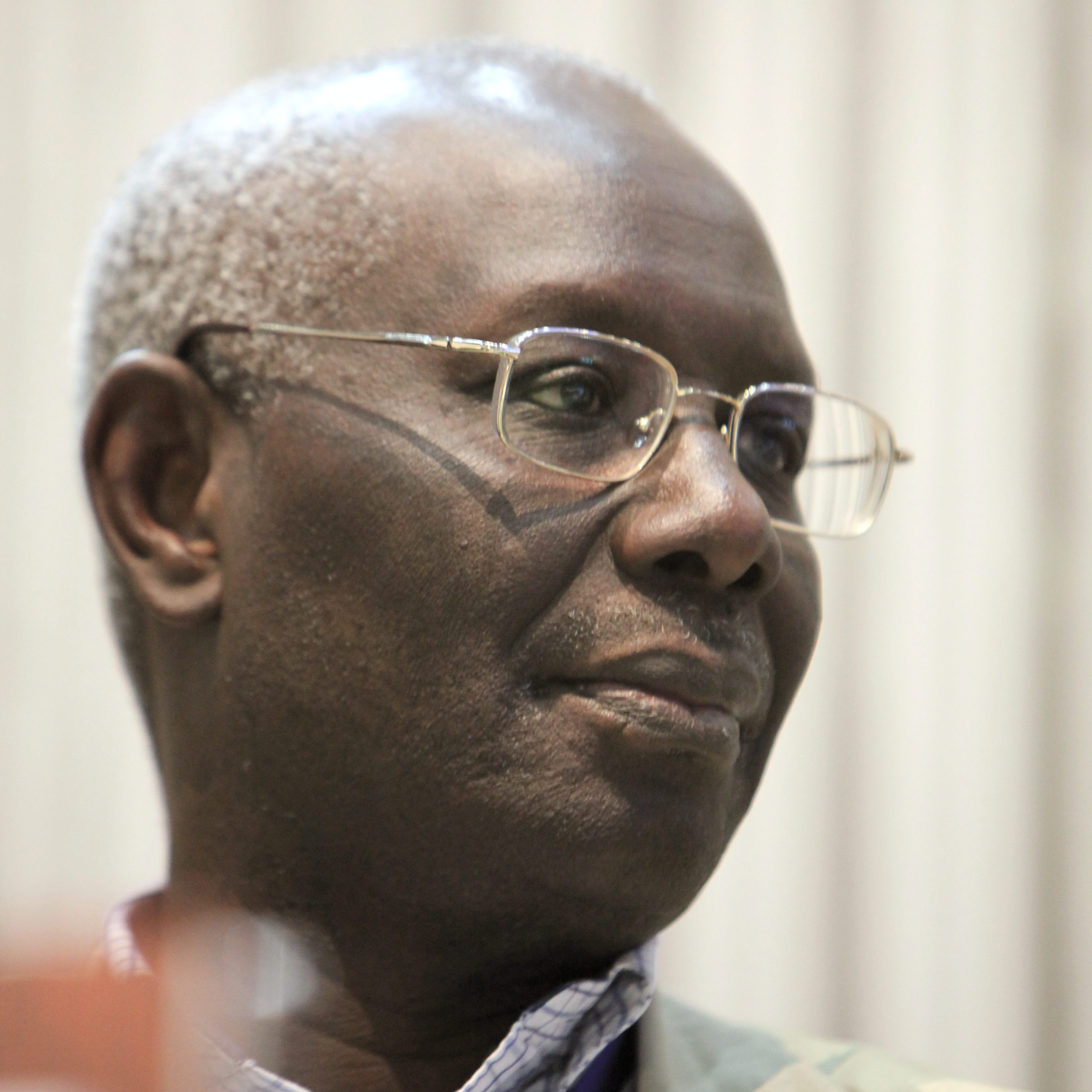
- Born: 26 October 1946 (age 79); Dakar, Senegal
- Occupations: Writer and journalist
- Writing career
- Notable works: Murambi, le livre des ossements
- Notable awards: 2022 Neustadt International Prize for Literature

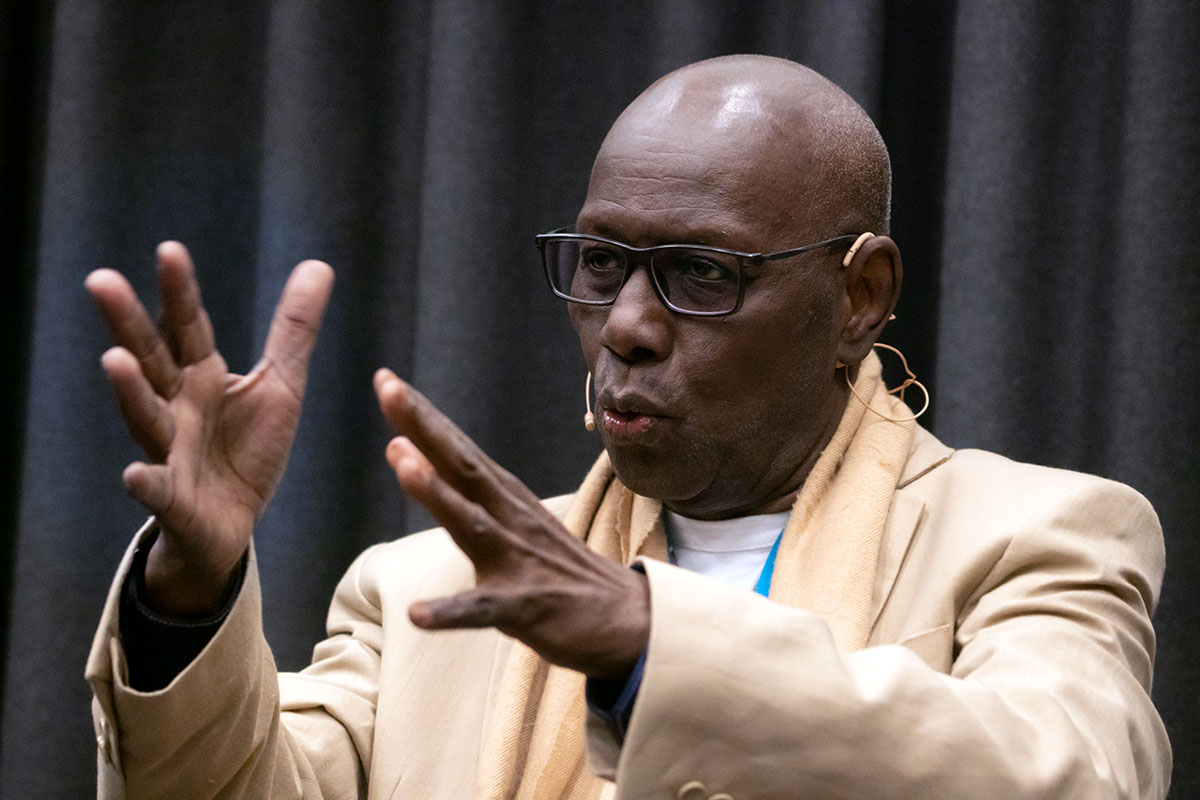
LiteratureXchange Festival, Aarhus/Denmark 2022

Boubacar Boris Diop (born 26 October 1946) is a Senegalese novelist, journalist and screenwriter. His best known work, Murambi, le livre des ossements (translated into English as Murambi: The Book of Bones), is the fictional account of a notorious massacre during the Rwandan genocide of 1994. He is also the founder of Sol, an independent newspaper in Senegal, and the author of many books, political works, plays and screenplays. Doomi Golo (2003), written in Wolof and rewritten by the author in French, deals with the life and legacy of a Senegalese Wolof family. The book was published by Papyrus Afrique, Dakar.

He was awarded the 2022 Neustadt International Prize for Literature.

== Life and career ==
Boubacar Boris Diop was born in Dakar in 1946. He taught literature and philosophy in several Senegalese high schools. He became technical advisor at the Cultural Ministry of Senegal. He began working as a journalist and writer, writing for local newspapers, the Swiss newspaper Neue Zürcher Zeitung and the Paris-based magazine Afrique, perspectives et réalités.

== Work ==
Diop's book Murambi, le livre des ossements was written for the Rwanda: écrire par devoir de mémoire [Rwanda: write out of a duty to remember] initiative of 1998. He is the author of Doomi Golo, a novel entirely in Wolof. It was translated to English by Vera Wülfing-Leckie and El Hadji Moustapha Diop, and published as Doomi Golo: The Hidden Notebooks by the Michigan State University Press in the series African Humanities and the Arts. His novel Murambi, The Book of Bones won him the 2022 Neustadt International Prize for Literature.

Diop also writes for the cinema and theatre and contributes to numerous publications, including Internazionale and Chimurenga.

In 2022, he headlined the Neustadt Festival.

=== Novels ===
- Kaveena, Philippe Rey, 2006.
- L'Impossible innocence, Philippe Rey, 2004.
- Doomi Golo, novel in Wolof, Éditions Papyrys, 2003 (in French Les Petits de la guenon, Éditions Philippe Rey, 2009).
- Murambi, Le livre des ossements, Paris: Stock, 2000. English translation by Fiona McLaughlin, Murambi: The Book of Bones (Indiana University Press, 2006)
- L'Europe, vues d'Afrique, short stories, several authors, Le Figuier.
- Le Cavalier et son ombre, Paris: Stock, 1997, Price Tropiques 1997.
- Les Traces de la meute, novel, Paris: Éditions l'Harmattan, 1993.
- Les Tambours de la mémoire, Paris: Nathan, 1987, re-edition L'Harmattan, 1990, Grand Prix de la République du Sénégal pour les Lettres, 1990.
- Le Temps de Tamango, follows Thiaroye, terre rouge (théâtre), first edition Paris: Harmattan, 1981, Prix Bureau Sénégalais du Droit d'Auteurs 1984. Translated into Italian. Re-issued Le Serpent à Plumes, 2002.

=== Essays ===
- Négrophobie, essay, with Odile Tobner and François-Xavier Verschave, Ed. Les Arènes, 2005.
- L'Afrique au secours de l'Occident, preface of the book by Anne-Cécile Robert, Ed. de l'Atelier
- Le Temps des aveux, Labor, Belgique 1993, collection of texts on the issue Ecriture et démocratie (writing and democracy)

=== Plays ===
- Thiaroye terre rouge, L'Harmattan 1981 (with Le Temps de Tamango).
- Grandakar-Usine, co-written with Senegalese director Oumar Ndao, has been performed widely in sub-Saharan Africa and the Maghreb.

==== Political writings ====
- Nicholas Sarkozy’s Unacceptable, 2008. Speech By Boubacar Boris Diop (Trans. from French by Wandia) Njoya).
- Ivory Coast: colonial adventure, By Boubacar Boris Diop. Monde Diplomatique, April 2005.
- LE SENEGAL ENTRE CHEIKH ANTA DIOP ET SENGHOR Boubacar Boris Diop, 2005.
- Boubacar Boris Diop (Journaliste écrivain) : Les parents pauvres des médias. The PANOS Institute of West Africa, 2002.
- Boubacar Boris Diop, Dakar Noir . Transition - Issue 87 (Volume 10, Number 3), 2001, pp. 90–107.
- The new wretched of the earth on the Spanish exclaves Ceuta and Melilla at signandsight.com.

== Bibliography ==
- Boubacar Boris Diop, La Maison des Auteurs, Les Francophonies en Limousin. Biography and links, December 2007.
- Culturebas.net: Artist portrait Boubacar Boris Diop, 28 April 2005.
- Boubacar Boris DIOP: Biographie, senegalaisement.com.
- Boubacar Boris Diop Returns to Senegal. CENTER FOR AFRICAN STUDIES RUTGERS UNIVERSITY Newsletter: January 2005, Volume V.

=== Interviews ===
- Interview with Boubacar Boris Diop, Yolande Bouka & Chantal Thompson. Lingua Romana: a journal of French, Italian and Romanian culture, Volume 2, number 1 / fall 2004.
- Sugnet, Charles. Dances with Wolofs: A conversation with Boubacar Boris Diop. Transition - Issue 87 (Volume 10, Number 3), 2001, pp. 138–159
- BOUBACAR BORIS DIOP : « Il a été des combats les plus rudes pour la dignité de l’homme noir’ », Elie-Charles MOREAU.

== See also ==
- François-Xavier Verschave
