= Doudou Diène =

Senegalese lawyer and politician

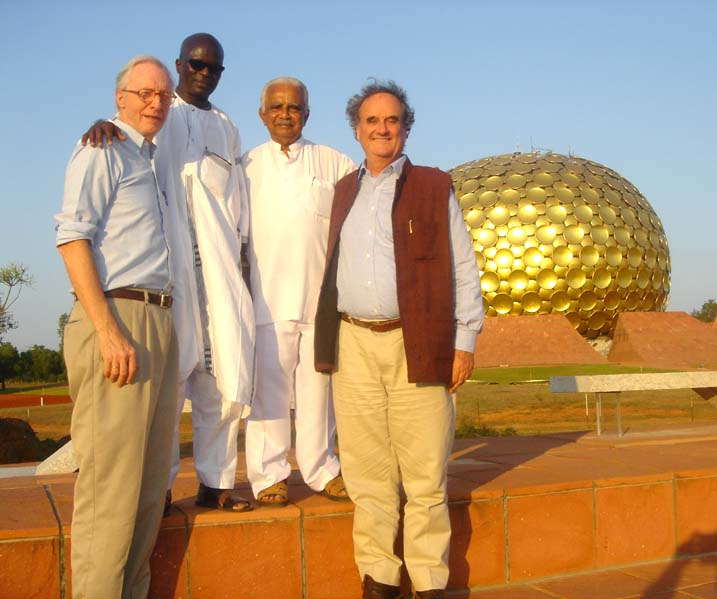
- Doudou Diène (2nd from left)

Rapporteur spécial à l'ONU-

Personal details
- Born: 12 December 1941 (age 84) Mbour, Senegal
- Profession: Jurist

Doudou Diène (French pronunciation: [dudu djɛn]; born 1941) is a Senegalese jurist. He was United Nations Special Rapporteur on contemporary forms of racism, racial discrimination, xenophobia and related intolerance from 2002–2008.

== Education ==
Diène holds a law degree from the University of Caen (France), a doctorate in public law from the University of Paris, a diploma in political science from the Institut d'Études Politiques in Paris, and an Honorary Degree of Doctor of Laws degree from the University of the West Indies (Cave Hill, Barbados)

== Titles ==
Between 1972 and 1977 he served as Senegal's deputy representative to UNESCO. In 1977, he joined the UNESCO secretariat, where he held several positions including Director of the Division of Inter-cultural Projects. He was appointed Special Rapporteur for racism-related topics by the United Nations Commission on Human Rights in August 2002, replacing Maurice Glele-Ahanhanzo of Benin and serving until July 2008 when he was succeeded by Githu Muigai (Kenya).

In 2005, the UN assigned him to investigate violence in Togo and racism in Japan. He also investigated, as an independent expert, human rights violations during the 2010–2011 Ivorian crisis, and later in Gaza Strip in 2014 to 2018.

In 2007, Diène denounced the words of French President Nicolas Sarkozy during his "Dakar speech" and spoke of an attempt to, "scientifically legitimize historical stereotypes of the construction of racism".

In 2011, he was appointed Independent Expert on the situation of human rights in Côte d'Ivoire.

Doudou Diène has been chairman of the United Nations commission of inquiry on Burundi since February 2018.
