= Galopin (disambiguation) =

Galopin can refer to:

Galopin, a British Thoroughbred racehorse

== People with the surname Galopin ==
- Alexandre Galopin, a Belgian businessman
- Arnould Galopin, a French author
- Claude Galopin, a French automotive engineer
- Pierre Galopin, a French military officer
