= Vera Wülfing-Leckie =

German-born British translator (1954–2021)

- Born: Vera Wülfing; 1954; Tübingen, Baden-Württemberg, West Germany
- Died: 8 February 2021 (aged 66); United Kingdom
- Education: Wadham College, Oxford; University of Dundee; University of Johannesburg
- Occupations: Homeopath; Translator
- Known for: Translation of African literature
- Spouse: Ross Leckie (m. 1979, divorced)
- Children: 4

Vera Wülfing-Leckie (1954 – 8 February 2021) was a German-born British homeopath and a translator of African literature. She lived in Africa for much of her adult life, and translated, among others, works by Boubacar Boris Diop from Senegal and Véronique Tadjo from Côte d'Ivoire. Diop's novel Doomi Golo: The Hidden Notebooks was on the shortlist for the 2017 Best Translated Book Award.

== Life ==
=== Living in Germany and the UK ===
Vera Wülfing was born in Tübingen, Germany. During World War II, her father Gert Wülfing, a physician, was a prisoner of war in Russia. Her mother Ellen, also a physician, escaped the Russians from what later became East Germany to the West. Wülfing attended primary school in Tübingen. When her parents opened a practice in Lörrach, close to the Swiss border where they felt safer, she went to the gymnasium. She received a scholarship to study in England in 1977, and studied classics and modern languages at Oxford's Wadham College. She met Ross Leckie, also a student there, whom she married in 1979. Their son Douglas was born the same year, and the family moved to Scotland in 1981, where they ran a farm. Daughter Xenia was born in 1983, and son Patrick in 1985.

=== Living in South Africa and Senegal ===
Wülfing-Leckie began studies in medicine at the University of Dundee, where she became friends with South Africans committed to fighting apartheid, such as Edwin Cameron. The Chernobyl disaster in 1986 left her worried about the family's health, and planning to seek more safety in the southern hemisphere. The family moved to South Africa in 1989. A daughter, Alexia, was born in 1991. The couple divorced, and her husband returned to England. Wülfing-Leckie stayed and studied alternative medicine at the University of Johannesburg in 1997, completing a doctorate in homeopathy. She opened her own practice in Johannesburg.

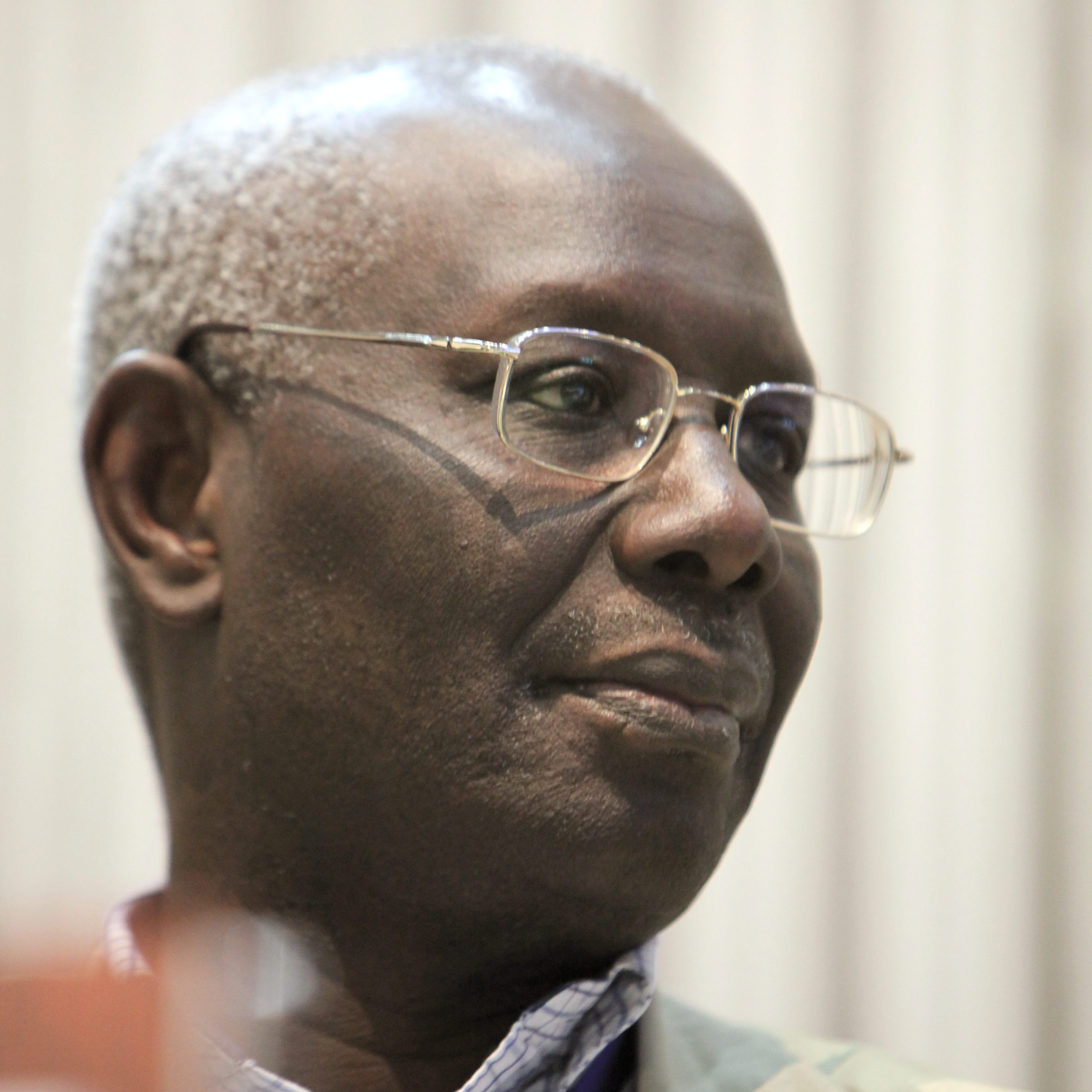
Boubacar Diop

Wülfing-Leckie met Boubacar Boris Diop, a Senegalese novelist. She moved to Senegal in 2009, where she practised homeopathy, but also began to translate literature. She translated texts by Diop to English, in 2014 the political essay L'Afrique au-delà du miroir to Africa Beyond the Mirror. In 2016, she translated the novel Doomi Golo, first written in the Wolof language. Together with El Hadji Moustapha Diop, she translated mainly from a French version, Les Petits de guenon, and the English novel was published as Doomi Golo: The Hidden Notebooks by the Michigan State University Press in the series African Humanities and the Arts. The book was on the shortlist for the 2017 Best Translated Book Award. She translated a novel by Véronique Tadjo, an author from Côte d'Ivoire, into English as In the Company of Men.

== Health and death ==
Wülfing-Leckie was described by her former husband, Ross Leckie, as having suffered from depression for many years.

Vera Wülfing-Leckie died in the UK while visiting her children, at age 66.
