= Hannibal (Leckie novel) =

1995 novel by Ross Leckie

- First edition
- Author: Ross Leckie
- Language: English
- Genre: Historical novel
- Publisher: Canongate
- Publication date: 1995
- Publication place: United Kingdom
- Media type: Print (hardback & paperback)
- Pages: 245
- ISBN: 0862415446
- Preceded by: The Gourmet's Companion
- Followed by: Scipio: a novel

Hannibal is a 1995 historical novel by Scottish writer Ross Leckie. The book relates the exploits of Hannibal's invasion of Rome beginning in 218 BC, narrated by the Carthaginian general in his retirement. It was the first of the Carthage trilogy, covering the Punic Wars. The novel received mixed reviews, mainly due to the extreme violence occasionally described in the narrative.

== Synopsis ==
Beginning with the general's youth and a potted history of Carthage in an attempt to explain Hannibal's hatred of Rome, the bulk of the story is confined to the invasion of Italy and the epic journey Hannibal's army took to reach its goal, including the voyage across the Straits of Gibraltar with his elephants on rafts, the far from easy passage through Spain and of course, the incredible feat of taking his entire army with their elephants over the Alps. The events described are often violent and sometimes quite horrific in their cruelty both on the journey and in the fighting which took place on Italian soil as Hannibal's army sweeps through the Italian countryside seeking to out-manoeuvre his Roman opponents.

== Reviews ==
- http://www.nytimes.com/1996/12/29/books/torture-carnage-elephants.html
- Fiction Book Review: Hannibal by Ross Leckie, Author Regnery Publishing $19.95 (0p) ISBN 978-0-89526-443-5
- Hannibal (The Carthage Trilogy, #1) by Ross Leckie | Goodreads
