= National and Nomadic Guard =

National and Nomadic Guard of Chad الحرس الوطني التشادي للبدو والرحل Garde nationale et nomade du Tchad
- Abbreviation: GNNT

Agency overview
- Formed: 1960
- Preceding agency: Territorial Guard

Jurisdictional structure
- Operations jurisdiction: Chad
- Constituting instrument: Article 195 of Constitution of Chad
- Specialist jurisdiction: National border patrol, security, integrity

Operational structure
- Agency executive: Général de brigade Tahir Ahmat Hissein, Commandant
- Parent agency: Ministry for Territorial Administration

Notables
- Significant operation: Chadian Civil War (1965–1979)

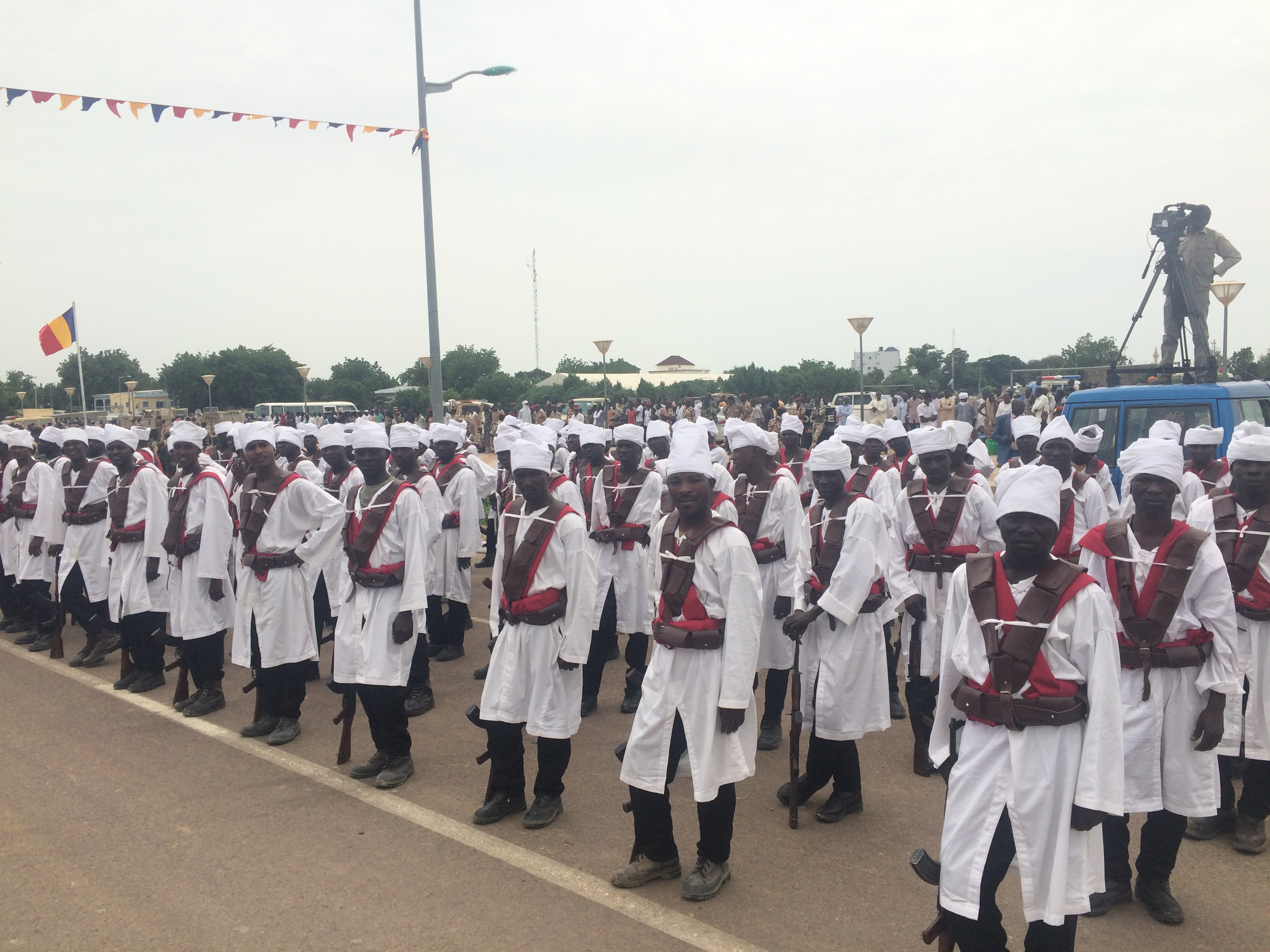
Detachment of the National and Nomadic Guard in N'Djamena during the parade of the 59th anniversary of independence of Chad

The National and Nomadic Guard of Chad (الحرس الوطني التشادي للبدو والرحل, Garde Nationale et Nomade du Tchad - GNNT) is one of five defence and security forces in Chad. (The others are the Army, the Gendarmerie, the Police and the Judicial Police.) Article 200 of the Constitution of 1996 states that the duties of the GNNT are the protection of politicians, government officials, and government buildings; the maintenance of order in rural areas; and the guarding of prisons and prisoners. These responsibilities remain unchanged in the new Constitution of 2018 but are now in Article 195.

== History ==
The GNNT was first known in the 1960s as the Territorial Guard, but was quickly renamed the Nomad and National Guard, carrying out much the same duties it does today: providing security for officials, government buildings, and regional government posts. Differently from today, the GNN was then dominated by Southerners, with only 250 Toubou. This also explains the resentment that brought in 1968 to the destruction of the GNN garrison of Aozou and the mutiny of the Toubou units, forming la Deuxième Armée (the Second Army) of the FROLINAT. Notwithstanding this setback, President François Tombalbaye showed much more trust in the GNN than in the Army; by 1971, its numbers had risen to at least 3,500, commanded by Camille Gourvennec, a French officer and director of information services (espionage). Gourvennec's deputy was Pierre Galopin.

When the Chadian Civil War extended itself to the Borkou-Ennedi-Tibesti in 1968, the GNN found itself increasingly on the frontline against the insurgents. The final battle between the insurgency and the Chadian Armed Forces came in 1977–78, when Goukouni Oueddei, leader of a FROLINAT faction, conquered all government strongholds in northern Chad, inflicting staggering losses to the armed forces. The GNN in particular lost heavily in early 1978 when Goukouni took Fada and the capital of the Bourkou-Ennedi-Tibesti, Faya-Largeau. This practically brought an end to the GNN, until it was revived shortly before 1996 by the former President Idriss Déby.

While the Constitution states, in Article 201, that the GNNT must "respect the liberties and rights of man" when exercising its functions, the GNNT has been accused of perpetrating serious human rights violations, as reported by Amnesty International. Following the murder of a GNNT corporal, the Guard extrajudicially executed the suspect on November 17, 1996.

== Command ==
The GNNT is under the control of the Ministry for Territorial Administration, unlike the Army and the Gendarmerie, which come under the responsibility of the Ministry of Defence. From May 24, 2006, to June 12, 2019, the GNNT was commanded by Brigadier General Mahamat Saleh Brahim, the cousin of President Idriss Déby. His replacement was General Tahir Ahmat Hissein.
