= Captive of the Desert =

1990 film

- Film poster
- Directed by: Raymond Depardon
- Written by: Raymond Depardon
- Produced by: Pascale Dauman
- Starring: Sandrine Bonnaire
- Cinematography: Raymond Depardon
- Release date: 18 April 1990
- Running time: 96 minutes
- Country: France
- Language: French

Captive of the Desert (French: La captive du désert) is a 1990 French drama film directed by Raymond Depardon. It was entered into the 1990 Cannes Film Festival. It was based in part on the experiences of Françoise Claustre who was captured by Chadian rebels in 1974, later joined by her husband, and the pair finally released in 1977.

== Cast ==
- Sandrine Bonnaire - La captive
- Dobi Koré
- Fadi Taha
- Dobi Wachinké
- Badei Barka
- Atchi Wahi-Li
- Daki Koré
- Isai Koré
- Mohamed Ixa
- Brahim Barkaï
- Hadji Azouma
- Barkama Hadji
- Sidi Hadji Maman
