= 12 Days (film) =

- French poster
- French: 12 Jours
- Directed by: Raymond Depardon
- Produced by: Claudine Nougaret
- Cinematography: Raymond Depardon
- Edited by: Simon Jacquet
- Music by: Alexandre Desplat
- Production companies: Palmeraie et Désert; Auvergne Rhône-Alpes Cinéma; France 2 Cinéma; Wild Bunch; Palatine Étoile 14
- Release dates: March 25, 2017 (Cannes); November 29, 2017 (France)
- Running time: 87 minutes
- Country: France
- Language: French

12 Days (French: 12 Jours) is a 2017 French documentary film directed by Raymond Depardon. It premiered at the 2017 Cannes Film Festival and received very positive reviews.

== Synopsis ==
Filmed at the Centre hospitalier Le Vinatier in Bron near to Lyon, the title derives from a French law that states that patients who are involuntarily committed to a psychiatric institution must have their case reviewed by a judge within 12 days of their committal.

== Reception ==
12 Days received a 95% score on Rotten Tomatoes, based on 23 reviews. In The Guardian, Wendy Ide wrote "The extraordinary level of access and intimacy begs the question, if someone is not deemed fit to leave a psychiatric ward, can they really agree to participation in a documentary? [...] However empathetic the approach and honourable the intent, questions of consent and the spectre of exploitation lurk at the edge of the frame. Moral questions notwithstanding, this is a remarkable piece of work," and gave it four stars out of five.

12 Days was nominated for the César Award for Best Documentary Film at the 43rd César Awards.
