= Françafrique (film) =

2010 French documentary film

- Official movie poster
- Directed by: Patrick Benquet
- Production company: Compagnie des Phares et Balises
- Release date: 2010
- Running time: 160 minutes (80 minutes of each part)
- Country: France
- Language: French

Françafrique is a French documentary film by Patrick Benquet, dedicated to the special relations between the French power and the former African colonies, after the independence acquired by these territories. The documentary was noticed in particular by the testimonies, which it includes, of former speakers.

== Synopsis ==
Fifty years before this documentary, in 1960, the French colonies in Africa became independent. But independence did not mean for the French power to lose all control and influence: General de Gaulle entrusted Jacques Foccart with the establishment of a system which aimed to keep control of the former colonies, by means, legal or illegal.

This system was called “Françafrique”, although this neologism was invented in 1955 by Félix Houphouët-Boigny to designate something else at the time, a hope for harmonious collaboration between the metropolis and its colonies on the African continent.

These two 80-minute films, show the coherence of a certain number of events: the Biafra war, the semi-official actions of the mercenary Bob Denard, the Diamonds Affair, the civil wars in the Republic of Congo and Angola, the Elf Affair, the dismissal of minister Jean-Marie Bockel at the request of Omar Bongo, uranium in Niger, etc.

Behind these events, there is, from de Gaulle to Sarkozy, via François Mitterrand, a ruthless logic of support for African dictatorships, rigged elections, political crimes and corruption.

== Awards ==
Year	Award	Category	Result	Ref.
2011	FIPA	Situations of French creation	Nominated	
2011	16th Radio and Television Laurels (by Audiovisual Club of Paris)	Historic documentary	Won	
2011	FIGRA (for Part 1 'La Raison d'Etat')		Nominated	
2011	FIGRA (for Part 2 'L'Argent Roi')	Special mention of the jury	Won	
2012	French Critics' Union	Best television documentary	Won	
