= News Items =

1983 film

- Directed by: Raymond Depardon
- Cinematography: Raymond Depardon
- Edited by: Françoise Prenant
- Release date: 1 June 1983
- Running time: 108 minutes
- Country: France
- Language: French

News Items (French: Faits divers) is a 1983 French documentary film, directed by Raymond Depardon, about daily life at police station in the fifth arrondissement of Paris. It was screened in the Un Certain Regard section at the 1983 Cannes Film Festival. It was selected for screening as part of the Cannes Classics section at the 2016 Cannes Film Festival.
