= Ross Leckie =

Scottish writer (born 1957)

- Born: Peter Ross Leckie; 6 May 1957 (age 68); Irvine, Ayrshire, Scotland
- Education: Fettes College; Drumtochty Castle Preparatory School
- Alma mater: Corpus Christi College, Oxford
- Occupation: Writer
- Notable work: Carthage trilogy
- Spouses: Vera Wülfing (m. 1979, divorced) Sophie Drinkal (m. 1995, divorced)
- Children: 10

Peter Ross Leckie (born 6 May 1957) is a Scottish writer of historical novels, best known for his Carthage trilogy.

== Biography ==
Leckie attended Drumtochty Castle Preparatory School and Fettes College. He studied classics at Corpus Christi College, Oxford, where he was also President of the Junior Common Room. He met Vera Wülfing, a student of languages from Germany, and they married in 1979. They moved to Scotland in 1981. The couple had four children. In 1995 Leckie married Sophie Drinkall, and they had six children. They divorced in 2019.

== Works ==
=== Carthage Trilogy ===
1. Hannibal (also as Hannibal: A novel)
2. Scipio Africanus (also as Scipio: A novel)
3. Carthage

=== Non-fiction ===
- The Bluffer's Guide to The Classics
- Grampian: A Country in Miniature
- The Gourmet's Companion
