= Christoph Staewen =

German physician

Christoph Staewen (14 July 1926 – 24 April 2002) was a German medical doctor, specialist of psychiatry, neurology and psychotherapy. In 1963 and early 1964 he visited parts of west and central Africa, amongst others the Tibesti region. In 1964, amongst the people of Yoruba, he began to study in Western Nigeria the conditions of uprooting of these people caused by the increasing confrontation with the technical civilisation of the "First World", and provoking more and more reactions of anxiety and deformations of behaviour. Later he worked for more than six years as a in Niger, Congo-Brazzaville and Chad, where he continued his research on African psychology.

On 21 April 1974, he and two other Europeans were taken hostage by Hissène Habré, the later leader of Chad from 1982 until 1990. The other captives were two French citizens, Françoise Claustre, an archeologist, and Marc Combe, a development worker. Combe escaped in 1975 but, despite the intervention of the French Government, Claustre (whose husband was a senior French government official) was not released until 1 February 1977. Staewen, whose wife Elfriede was killed in the attack of capture, was released after payments of West German officials on 11 June 1974.
