= Pierre Galopin =

French military officer (1932–1975)

Pierre Alphonse Galopin (Clermont-Ferrand, 10 January 1932 – Zouï, 4 April 1975) was a commandant of the French Army who served as a deputy to intelligence officer Camille Gourvennec in Chad during the 1960s and 1970s. He came to international attention when he was captured by a group of Chadian rebels under Hissène Habré on 4 August 1974 in the remote Tibesti Mountains, thus becoming one of the hostages in the so-called Claustre Affair. After subsequent negotiations stalled, Galopin was executed by hanging on 4 April 1975.

== Biography ==
Galopin had spent most of his professional career in the Sahara region. As a colonial officer, he partook in operations in Indochina, Algeria and Mauritania. He subsequently served in Chad during much of the period from independence in 1960 until his death.

In Chad, Galopin was deputy to Camille Gourvennec, both as deputy commander of the Nomad and National Guard and as deputy security adviser to the Chadian president François Tombalbaye. Gourvennec himself was director of the Chadian secret police BCSR. In that capacity, he was responsible for hunting down, interrogating and torturing several of Tombalbaye's opponents.

From September 1968 to March 1969, during the Chadian Civil War, Galopin went to the Tibesti Mountains to negotiate with the FROLINAT and other Toubou rebels. However, rather than being a mere negotiator, Galopin's approach was to capitalize on existing divisions within the Toubou to the benefit of French and Chadian authorities. As the exiled derde Oueddei Kichidemi supported the rebellion, Galopin offered powerful posts to Oueddei's rivals in exchange for loyalty to the Tombalbaye regime. These actions played a major role in rendering the rebels distrustful of Galopin. Moreover, Galopin was involved in an April 1969 operation to entirely liquidate the Oueddei family, to which both Kichidemi and rebel commander Goukouni Oueddei (son of the derde) belonged. Although the operation did not go according to plan, Goukouni's brother Mahamat Oueddeï-mi was killed in the course of it.

In March 1970, Galopin and Gourvennec arrested and brutally interrogated Claude Bocquel, a former aide to the Central African authorities under Bokassa, and enlisted him into the Chadian secret service. They later tasked Bocquel with assassinating the dissident Outel Bono, which he did in August 1973.

=== Capture and execution ===
In July 1974, Galopin was again sent to the north of Chad to negotiate the release of Françoise Claustre and her fellow hostages who had been kidnapped by the FROLINAT under Hissène Habré. According to Pierre Claustre, Françoise's husband and a French official, it was likely that Gourvennec had pressured Tombalbaye to choose Galopin as an envoy. This was to have dire consequences. Galopin's closeness to Gourvennec, their "divide and conquer" tactics, their involvement in the brutal treatment of Toubou rebels, and the fact Goukouni Oueddei detested Galopin for the 1969 killing of his brother made him highly unfit to negotiate successfully with the rebels. Furthermore, declassified French intelligence sources indicate that Galopin's mission had secret underlying objectives (as was the case during his earlier negotiations in 1968–69): fomenting dissent among the rebel troops and gathering intelligence about their functioning. French historians Pascal Airault and Jean-Pierre Bat even claimed Galopin deliberately aimed to be taken hostage because "infiltrating" the rebel group could facilitate his mission.

On 4 August 1974, during negotiations, Habré suddenly seized Galopin and added him to the hostages taken earlier. Whereas the rebels had already requested ransom money for the other hostages, they now asked to be supplied with weaponry and ammunition in exchange for liberating Galopin. The advent of Pierre Claustre as negotiator in late 1974 helped to convince the rebels to modify their demands surrounding the other hostages. However, the negotiations surrounding Galopin stalled and the rebels announced that they would execute him on 4 April 1975 if no weapons were delivered; they also stated that Galopin was being put on trial by the FROLINAT through a "revolutionary tribunal" for his earlier actions in northern Chad. This tribunal formally sentenced him to death on 26 December 1974. Goukouni later claimed (in May 1979, at a stage where he was embroiled in political conflict with Habré) that Habré had been opposed to this death sentence and criticized him harshly for this.

Galopin was executed by hanging on the announced date of 4 April 1975. There exist multiple conflicting accounts of the execution. The account provided by the rebel interlocutors to Pierre Claustre stated that Habré, after awaiting the planned weapons delivery for ten hours, gave the order to kill Galopin. By contrast, Goukouni stated that the rebels were not actually planning to carry out the execution that day, but they impulsively decided to do so after receiving a mysterious message from either the French or Chadian authorities in Bardaï; the message threatened to "decimate" the rebels if they did not release Galopin. This account is supported by a diary entry of French ambassador Raphaël Touze who had ordered his subordinates to send a firm message to FROLINAT on that date.

Galopin's remains were later returned to France. He was buried in the École Militaire in Paris on 17 May 1994.
