= Nicolas Sarkozy Dakar address =

2007 speech by French President Nicolas Sarkozy

On July 27, 2007, French President Nicolas Sarkozy delivered a speech at Cheikh Anta Diop University in Dakar, Senegal. The speech, known in France as the Discours de Dakar (Dakar address), drew criticism from Africans who disagreed with Sarkozy's statement that "the tragedy of Africa is that the African has not fully entered into history... They have never really launched themselves into the future."

The speech came as part of a foreign trip with then-wife Cécilia Attias, anticipated as an effort to repair French relations with the continent after Sarkozy's predecessor Jacques Chirac had been perceived as supporting authoritarian governments in former French colonies.

The candidate Nicolas Sarkozy, before his election to the French presidency, advocated the end of Françafrique, in favor of the development of a simple partnership between France and Africa. After the 2005 law on recognition of the nation and national contribution in favor of repatriated French people (article 4, later repealed, which called for recognizing in school curricula the positive role of the French presence overseas) and the immigration policy set by the July 24, 2006 law on immigration and integration, the image of France in Africa deteriorated.

It is in this context that Nicolas Sarkozy, accompanied by ministers Bernard Kouchner, Jean-Marie Bockel and Rama Yade, is on an African tour which began in Libya on July 25.

Lasting 50 minutes, Nicolas Sarkozy's speech was written by his adviser Henri Guaino. It is pronounced in front of an audience of hand-picked academics, the real potentially hostile students having been excluded.

In this speech, he qualifies “the slave trade and slavery” as “crimes against man, crimes against humanity”, denounces certain effects of colonization, “They believed that they were civilization […] . They damaged an ancestral wisdom. […] The colonizer took, used, exploited, plundered resources […]. They were wrong. […] They were wrong but some were sincere”. “Your heartbreak and your suffering are ours and are therefore mine,” he says. He also invites Africa to make its own self-criticism, the present failures of the continent counterbalancing the wrongs of the colonizers "Africa has its share of responsibility in its own misfortune: colonization is not responsible for the bloody wars that the Africans among themselves, genocides, dictators, fanaticism, corruption and prevarication”. In the most controversial passage, he explains that the obstacles to the development of the continent should be sought within an African identity:

“The tragedy of Africa is that the African man has not entered history enough […]. He never rushes towards the future […]. In this universe where nature commands everything, man remains motionless in the midst of an immutable order where everything is written in advance. […] There is no place for human adventure, nor for the idea of progress”...
