= Françoise Claustre =

French archaeologist

- Born: 8 February 1937
- Disappeared: 20 April 1974; Bardaï, Chad
- Died: 3 September 2006 (aged 69); Montauriol, Pyrénées-Orientales, France
- Occupation: Archaeologist
- Known for: Victim of kidnapping by Chadian rebels

Françoise Claustre (8 February 1937 – 3 September 2006), was a French archaeologist.

== Life and career ==
Claustre was taken hostage by a group of Chadian rebels, led by Hissène Habré, on 20 April 1974, at Bardaï, in the Tibesti Mountains of northern Chad. At the same time, the rebels also seized a German doctor, Christophe Staewen, and Marc Combe, who was an assistant of Claustre's husband, Pierre. Marc Combe managed to escape and Staewan was released on 11 June 1974, after a ransom had been paid by the West German government.

Military officer Pierre Galopin was sent to negotiate with the rebels on behalf of the French and Chadian Governments, but he was captured by them in August 1974, and executed in April 1975 after the French government refused to exchange him for arms.

Claustre's husband, a senior French development worker, was away on business when the attack on Bardaï took place. He lobbied strongly to get his wife released, and also attempted to intervene himself, but was captured by the rebels in August 1975. Habré then threatened to kill the Claustres unless a large ransom was paid. A sum of 10 million French Francs was paid by the French government, but this was insufficient to secure the release of the hostages.

France then resorted to diplomacy, seeking support from the Libyan leader, Muammar al-Gaddafi. Gaddafi's intervention led to the release of Pierre and Françoise Claustre, in Tripoli, on 1 February 1977.

After her release, Claustre returned to working as an archaeologist in France. In an interview with Paris Match, she said that she wanted to return to anonymity. In 1990, her story was made into a film by Raymond Depardon, La Captive du désert, starring Sandrine Bonnaire. Depardon had also visited the rebels and interviewed Claustre during her captivity. The resulting broadcast had generated considerable public interest, encouraging the subsequent action by the French government.

Claustre, who was born in Paris, died at her home in Montauriol, Pyrénées-Orientales, France, in September 2006, at the age of 69.

== See also ==
- List of kidnappings
- Lists of solved missing person cases

== Books ==
- Combe, Marc (1976). Otage Au Tibesti (in French). Paris: Flammarion. ISBN 978-2-08065-018-4.
