= François-Xavier Verschave =

French economist and historian (1945–2005)

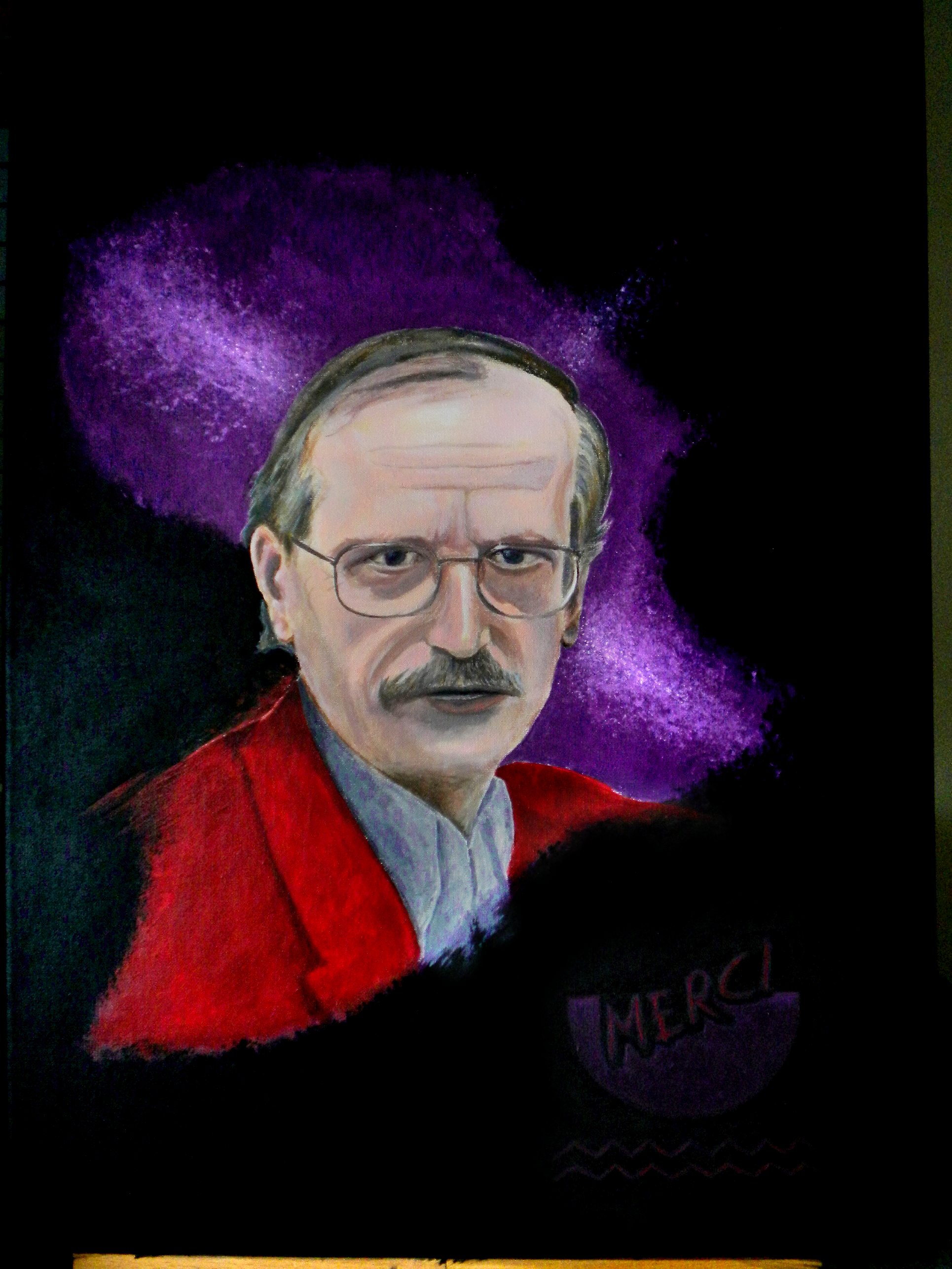
- Portrait of François-Xavier Verschave
- Born: 28 October 1945; Lille, France
- Died: 29 June 2005 (aged 59); Lyon, France
- Occupations: Economist; Historian; Human rights activist

François-Xavier Verschave (28 October 1945 – 29 June 2005) was a French economist and activist primarily known as one of the founders of the French NGO Survie ("Survival") and as coiner of the term Françafrique, an expression for France's neocolonialism, a specific type of neocolonialism imposed by France over its former colonies in Africa.

Verschave also researched the concept of global public goods and the economic theories of noted French historian Fernand Braudel. Survie was created in 1983 by the Manifeste des 54 prix Nobel ("Manifesto of 54 Nobel Prizes") as an NGO advocating against underdevelopment.

== Early life and career ==
An economist by training, Verschave was responsible from 1983 for economic policy and employment policy at Saint-Fons municipality, located in the suburbs of Lyon. He had served as president of Survie from 1995 and was also editor of its monthly newsletter Billets d'Afrique et d'ailleurs.

== La Françafrique ==
François-Xavier Verschave forged the term Françafrique as a parody of the term "France-Afrique" used by Félix Houphouët-Boigny, former president of Côte d'Ivoire (1960–1993), to boast of the good relations between the imperial power and the newly independent countries. (Note: "I dug up this term in 1994 from the ancient discourses of Côte d'Ivoire's ex-president, Houphouët-Boigny, in an attempt to explain how France was able to do in Africa exactly the reverse of [what is claimed by] its republican motto, going as far as to make itself the accomplice of the Rwandan genocide.)

Verschave's famous books La Françafrique (1998) and Noir silence (2000) have become standard works for anyone interested in the Rwandan genocide specifically, and generally the dissimulated policies followed by the French Republic in former colonies, in particular by opponents - who haven't always been political adversaries - French President Jacques Chirac and right-wing MP Charles Pasqua, involved in the Angolagate.

After the publication of Noir silence, which also criticized Jacques Chirac's role in the Françafrique, Verschave was targeted by Denis Sassou-Nguesso, head of the Republic of the Congo, Idriss Déby, president of Chad, and Omar Bongo, president of Gabon since 1967 and Africa's longest serving ruler at the time. Represented by a controversial lawyer Jacques Vergès, they all accused him of "offense toward a foreign state leader", on the basis of the 1881 law on the Freedom of the Press, a crime which is reminiscent of lese majesty, as the attorney general observed. However, Verschave was acquitted; the crime of "offense toward a foreign state leader" was judged contrary to the European Convention on Human Rights (ECHR). The author of Noir silence accused Omar Bongo of crimes against humanity, Idriss Déby of corruption and of being an "assassin", and Sassou Nguesso of corruption. Because of the alleged charges, the trial was only based on Verschave's "good faith", and not on the truthfulness of his allegations. Thereafter, he was not allowed to prove his allegations, which was judged contrary to the ECHR. However, the trial did permit various opponents of the Françafrique to testify: Ngarlejy Yorongar, opponent of Hissène Habré and then Idriss Déby, who spoke of the "eleven times" he was arrested and "tortured" during Déby's eight-years long rule. MP Charles Pasqua also sued Verschave for "libel", which resulted in the author paying symbolic damages of one franc.

== Death ==
Verschave died on June 29, 2005, four months after being diagnosed with pancreatic cancer.

== Bibliography ==
- Nord-Sud : de l’aide au contrat. Pour un développement équitable, 1991, Syros, 1991, 243 p.
- L’aide publique au développement, with Anne-Sophie BOISGALLAIS, 1994, Syros, 150 p.
- Libres leçons de Braudel. Passerelles pour une société non excluante, 1994, Syros, 221 p.
- Complicité de génocide ? La politique de la France au Rwanda, 1994, La Découverte, 178 p.
- La Françafrique : Le plus long scandale de la République, 1998, Stock, 380 p.
- Noir silence, 2000, Les Arènes, 595 p.
- Noir procès : offense à chefs d'État, 2001, Les Arènes, 382 p.
- Noir Chirac, 2002, Les Arènes, 310 p.
- De la Françafrique à la Mafiafrique, 2004, Tribord, 70 p.
- Au mépris des peuples : Le néocolonialisme franco-africain, entretien avec Philippe Hauser, 2004, La Fabrique, 120 p.
- "L’envers de la dette. Criminalité politique et économique au Congo-Brazza et en Angola", in Dossier noir de la politique africaine de la France n° 16, 2001, Agone, 225 p.
- Les Pillards de la forêt. Exploitations criminelles en Afrique, in Dossier noir de la politique africaine de la France n° 17, avec Arnaud Labrousse, 2002, Agone, 192 p.
- La santé mondiale entre racket et bien public, collectif, 2004, éditions Charles Léopold Meyer, 346 p.
- L'horreur qui nous prend au visage : L'État français et le génocide, Rapport de la Commission d’enquête citoyenne sur le rôle de la France dans le génocide des Tutsi au Rwanda, with Laure Coret, 2005, Karthala, 586 p.
- Négrophobie, réponse aux "Négrologues", journalistes françafricains et autres falsificateurs de l'information, with Odile Tobner and Boubacar Boris Diop, 2005, Les Arènes, 200 p. (a book opposed to reporter Stephen Smith's Négrologie and his claims that France wasn't involved in the Rwandan genocide)
- Billets d'Afrique, Survie 's mensual letter

François-Xavier Verschave also coordinated the Dossiers Noirs de la politique africaine de la France, edited by Survie and Agir ici, at editing houses L’Harmattan and Agone. Verschave gave the copyright of all his books to Survie.

== See also ==
- ATTAC NGO
- Boubacar Boris Diop
- Francophobia
- Gladio "stay-behind" NATO paramilitary organizations
- Global Public Good
- Neocolonialism
- Rwandan genocide
- Tiken Jah Fakoly's 2002 album, titled Françafrique
