= Françafrique =

France's sphere of influence in Africa

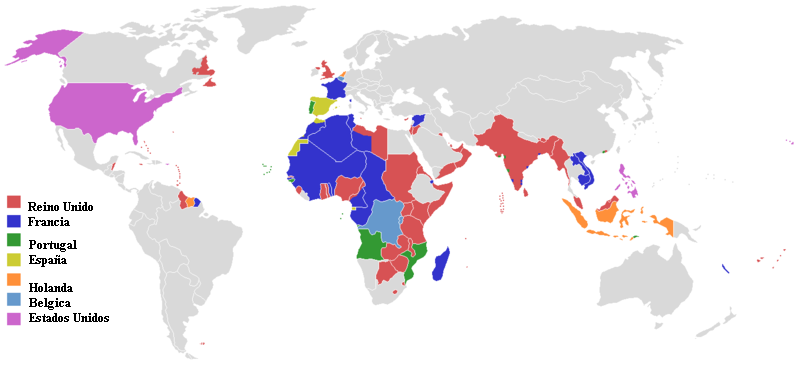
Map showing French colonies, protectorates and mandates (in blue) in Africa in 1945; namely French Equatorial Africa, French North Africa, French Somaliland, French Libya and French West Africa. Along with former Belgian colonies (shown in light blue), these areas today make up the bulk of francophone Africa.

In international relations, Françafrique (French pronunciation: [fʁɑ̃safʁik]) is France's sphere of influence (or pré carré in French, meaning 'backyard') over former French and Belgian colonies in sub-Saharan Africa. (Note: Multiple sources:) The term was derived from the expression France-Afrique, notably used by the first president of Ivory Coast, Félix Houphouët-Boigny, in 1955 to describe his country's close ties with France. It was later pejoratively renamed Françafrique by François-Xavier Verschave in 1998 to criticise the alleged corrupt and clandestine activities of various Franco-African political, economic and military networks, also defined as France's neocolonialism.

Following the independence of its African colonies beginning in 1959, France continued to maintain influence over the region, which was essential for then President Charles de Gaulle's vision of France as a global power (or grandeur in French) that could rival British and American influence in the post-colonial world.

The United States supported France's continuing presence in Africa to prevent the region from falling under Soviet influence during the Cold War.

Françafrique was defined by several features that emerged during the Cold War. The first was the African cell, consisting of the French President and his close advisors, which made policy decisions on Africa with the collaboration of powerful business networks and the French secret service. Another feature was the CFA franc, a currency union that pegged the currencies of most francophone African countries to the French franc. Françafrique was also largely based on the concept of institutional Coopération, which was implemented through a series of political, economic, military and cultural treaties between France and its former African colonies. France also saw itself as a guarantor of stability in the region, adopting an interventionist approach that culminated in military operations averaging one a year between 1960 and the mid-1990s. Finally, a defining feature of Françafrique was the network of personal, informal and familial links between French and African leaders. These networks often lacked oversight and scrutiny, which led to corruption and state racketeering.

Education was used as a tool to reinforce this system. France facilitated the arrival of young African executives who wished to pursue higher education in France: once graduated, fluent in French and imbued with European values, these young Africans returned to their countries. With the unofficial support of France, they would often become senior executives or join the state apparatus as senior civil servants.

Another tool was military cooperation. The defense agreements between France and francophone African countries were often accompanied by secret clauses allowing France to intervene militarily: to rescue regimes favorable to French interests, to fight jihadism, particularly in the Sahel, or to put an end to civil wars. Since 2022, several former French colonies in the Sahel have denounced their defense agreements with France, prompting the withdrawal of most French military forces in the region, some of which had been present since the 1960s. A notable example of this is the end of Operation Barkhane in 2022.

Since the end of the Cold War, the Françafrique regime has been progressively weakened by France's budgetary constraints, greater public scrutiny, the deaths of pivotal Françafrique actors (Foccart, Mitterrand, Pasqua and members of Elf), and the integration of France into the European Union. Economic liberalisation, high indebtedness, and political instability of the former African colonies, as well as the increase in African trade with other countries, have led France to slowly adapt its relations with former colonies.

== Etymology ==
The term Françafrique was derived from the expression France-Afrique. The first known usage is in a 1945 editorial from the pro-colonial politician and journalist Jean Piot in the newspaper L'Aurore. It has often been mistakenly attributed to a 1955 speech by President Félix Houphouët-Boigny of Ivory Coast, who advocated maintaining a close relationship with France even after independence. Close cooperation between Houphouët-Boigny and Jacques Foccart, chief advisor on African policy in the Charles de Gaulle and Georges Pompidou governments (1958–1974) is claimed by supporters to have contributed to the "Ivorian miracle" of economic and industrial progress.

The term Françafrique was subsequently used by François-Xavier Verschave as the title of his 1998 book, La Françafrique : le plus long scandale de la République ("Françafrique: the longest-lasting scandal in the Republic"), which criticises French policies in Africa.

Successive French governments in the past decades have repeatedly declared the end of Françafrique, which only goes to show how decolonization is still an unfinished process.

=== Pun ===
Verschave also noted the pun in the term Françafrique, as it sounds like "France à fric" (a source of cash for France; fric is French slang for 'cash'), and that "Over the course of four decades, hundreds of thousands of euros misappropriated from debt, aid, oil, cocoa... or drained through French importing monopolies, have financed French political-business networks (all of them offshoots of the main neo-Gaullist network), shareholders' dividends, the secret services' major operations and mercenary expeditions".

== History ==
=== Charles de Gaulle's presidency (1958–1969) ===
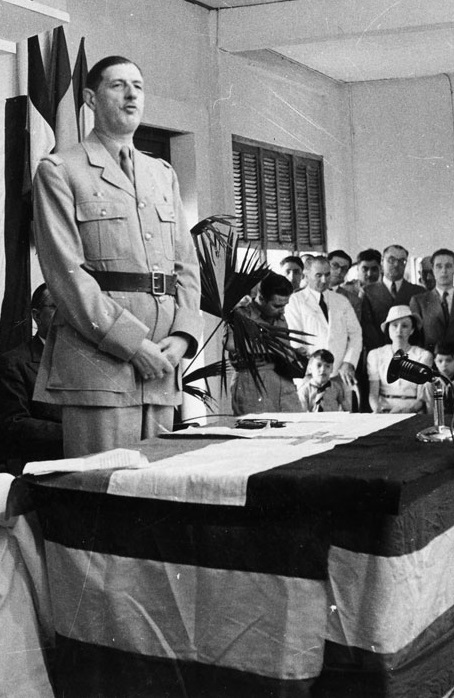
Charles de Gaulle at the inauguration of the Brazzaville Conference, 1944

When Charles de Gaulle returned to power as French President in 1958, France had already been severely weakened by World War II and by the conflicts in Indochina and Algeria. He proceeded to grant independence to France's remaining colonies in sub-Saharan Africa in 1960 in an effort to maintain close cultural and economic ties with them and to avoid more costly colonial wars. Compared to the decolonisation of French Indochina and Algeria, the transfer of power in sub-Saharan Africa was, for the most part, peaceful. Nevertheless, de Gaulle was keen on preserving France's status (or grandeur) as a global power rivalling British and American influence. Thus, he saw the close links with France's former African colonies as an opportunity to enhance France's image on the world stage, both as a major power and as a counterbalancing force between the United States and the Soviet Union during the Cold War. The United States supported France's continuing presence in Africa to prevent the region from falling under Soviet influence. Similarly, the United Kingdom had little interest in West Africa, which left France as the only major power in that region.

On 24 August 1958, in Brazzaville, President Charles de Gaulle recognized that African states had legitimate demands in terms of independence, but that they should go through a period of political learning in the French Community, an organization encompassing France and its colonies. A referendum was organized on 28 September 1958, to decide on the fate of the African states in question. Voting "Yes" meant joining the French Community and engaging on a path to independence, while voting "No" meant immediate independence. De Gaulle also warned that states voting "No" would commit secession, and that France would pull out all financial and material aid. All voted yes but Guinea, led by Ahmed Sékou Touré, head of the Democratic Party of Guinea.

On 2 October 1958, Guinea proclaimed its independence, and Sékou Touré became its first President. At the time, France was still processing its defeat in Indochina and feared that Guinea would incite uprisings in the region. Though Sékou Touré had sent a letter to de Gaulle on 15 October 1958, asking for Guinea to stay in the CFA franc zone, France banished them from the monetary union and engaged in economic retaliation. This prompted Guinea to seek aid from Eastern Bloc experts in order to build a new currency, which was seen as a further threat to French influence. Among the methods of destabilization used, "Opération Persil" involved introducing a large quantity of fake bills into the country to cause inflation and disturb the economy. Nevertheless, with the help of the USSR and China, Sékou Touré's regime held on to power until his death in 1984.

To further implement his vision of France's grandeur in Africa, de Gaulle appointed Jacques Foccart, a close adviser and former intelligence member of the French Resistance during World War II, as Secretary-General for African and Malagasy Affairs. Foccart played a pivotal role in maintaining France's sphere of influence in sub-Saharan Africa by negotiating a wide range of cooperation treaties. These treaties included France's former colonies in sub-Saharan Africa (Benin, Burkina Faso, Central African Republic, Chad, Comoros, Djibouti, Gabon, Guinea, Ivory Coast, Mali, Mauritania, Niger, Republic of the Congo and Senegal), former United Nations trust territories (Cameroon and Togo), former Belgian colonies (Rwanda, Burundi and Democratic Republic of Congo) and ex-Portuguese (Guinea-Bissau) and Spanish (Equatorial Guinea) territories. France's relationships with these countries was managed by the Ministry of Cooperation, which was created in 1961 out of the previous, colonial, Ministry for Overseas France. The Ministry of Cooperation served as a focal point for France's new system of influence in Africa until it was merged with the Ministry of Foreign Affairs in 1999. Jacques Foccart also built a dense web of personal networks between French and African leaders, which underpinned the institutional structures of Françafrique.

Foccart continued to serve as chief adviser for Africa until French President Valéry Giscard d'Estaing replaced him with René Journiac. Upon becoming President of France in 1995, Jacques Chirac again sought Foccart's counsel and even brought him on his first trip to Africa as French President. Foccart continued to play a role in Franco-African relations until his death in 1997.

=== Georges Pompidou's presidency (1969–1974) ===
During his five years in power, Georges Pompidou did not break with the Gaullist tradition. Françafrique continued to be strengthened under the leadership of Foccart, who consolidated the system of networks between France, French companies, and African elites.

=== Valéry Giscard d'Estaing's presidency (1974–1981) ===
When Valéry Giscard d'Estaing came to power in 1974, he intended to break with the practices of de Gaulle and modernize relations between France and Africa. Despite these intentions, the networks of Françafrique endured thanks to Journiac, who maintained strong ties with South Africa despite apartheid, but also with Congo, Gabon and Niger, whose raw materials were essential to France. Giscard-d'Estaing was also confronted with the political instability of African states, which led him to play the role of "policeman of Africa", i.e. to intervene militarily, notably in Chad and Zaire. Finally, Giscard-d'Estaing was involved in corruption cases revealed by the Canard Enchainé in October 1979. Jean-Bedel Bokassa, emperor of the Central African Republic, was alleged to have sent him suitcases of diamonds on several occasions. Silent at first, Giscard-d'Estaing finally spoke out as new evidence emerged, declaring that the gifts received had all been sold, with all proceeds going to NGOs. The affair was nevertheless a hit to his legitimacy.

=== François Mitterrand's presidency (1981–1995) ===
François Mitterrand's 14 years in power were marked by two opposing trends. The imperative remained to defend French interests in Africa, which was in line with the choices of Mitterrand's predecessors despite his political differences with them (Mitterrand was a socialist, unlike the three previous Presidents). Nevertheless, he instituted a shift in doctrine regarding Françafrique. In particular, French public financial aid was made conditional on the democratization of recipient African countries, which was in direct contradiction with the previous policy of open support for local strongmen.

Additionally, unlike his predecessors who maintained strong ties with South Africa, Mitterrand denounced the crimes of apartheid.

=== Jacques Chirac's presidency (1995–2007) ===
Upon his election in 1995, Jacques Chirac once again consulted with Jacques Foccart on African matters, going as far as to bring him on his first official visits to African countries. Chirac generally continued French diplomatic efforts to maintain special ties with Africa, opposing the devaluation of the CFA franc as well as the proposed reform of the African cooperation framework. The issue of human rights, which was a priority under Mitterrand, was far less prevalent in his foreign policy, as shown by his proximity with the authoritarian regime of Mobutu Sese Seko in Zaire.

=== Nicolas Sarkozy's presidency (2007–2012) ===
Elected in 2007, Nicolas Sarkozy merged the "African cell" of the French state into the official diplomatic cell, signaling a shift away from the neocolonial networks once woven by Foccart. However, Sarkozy also caused indignation in his Dakar address on 26 July 2007 at the Cheikh Anta Diop University, when he declared that "The tragedy of Africa is that the African has not fully entered into history ... They have never really launched themselves into the future," and "The African peasant only knew the eternal renewal of time, marked by the endless repetition of the same gestures and the same words... In this realm of fancy ... there is neither room for human endeavour nor the idea of progress."

=== Francois Hollande's presidency (2012–2017) ===
The five-year term of François Hollande was marked by an ambivalence in French foreign policy on Africa. Upon coming to power, Hollande promised the end of Françafrique, declaring "the time of Françafrique is over: there is France, there is Africa, there is the partnership between France and Africa, with relations based on respect, clarity and solidarity." However, he also oversaw Operation Serval and the beginning of Operation Barkhane, two successive large-scale counterinsurgency operations in the Sahel. His personal visits to several African dictators such as Idriss Déby or Paul Biya drew criticisms that recalled the difficulty of France to break clearly with Françafrique ever since Mitterrand instituted the shift in the 1980s.

=== Emmanuel Macron's presidency (2017–present) ===
In August 2017, Emmanuel Macron founded the Presidential Council for Africa, an advisory body composed of people from civil society, mostly members of the African diaspora. While its supporters see the institution as a way of promoting civil society organisations, rather than officials or business leaders, others see it as a new bridge between African elites, the African diaspora in France, and French interests in Africa.

In April 2021, President Macron visited Chad for the funeral of President Idriss Déby, who died while commanding a counterinsurgency against the Front for Change and Concord in Chad (FACT). Déby had ruled Chad from 1990 to his death and was succeeded by his son and army general Mahamat Déby. The official visit of the French head of state contributed to legitimize the "Déby clan" at the head of Chad.

During the 2020s in the Coup Belt, the military juntas of Burkina Faso, Mali, and Niger withdrew from military agreements with France and removed French as an official language. In 2023, they signed a mutual defense pact called the Confederation of Sahel States (CES). Guinea's military junta also expressed support for the CES in spite of the formal position of ECOWAS, weakening the international organization's denunciation of the coups.

On 31 January 2025, a report adopted by the French Defense and Armed Forces Commission noted the failure of the attempted renewal of Franco-African relations, initiated by Emmanuel Macron in during his first term, and a deterioration of France's image in Africa.

In April 2025, the parliamentary intelligence delegation expressed its concerns over the repeated occurrence of unanticipated coups, revealing a flaw in French intelligence.

In June 2025, President Macron said, "The solution Russia is proposing directly, or through Wagner, is neocolonialism. It secures your position as leader. And then it takes your mines, it takes your information system, and it puts the country under lockdown. This is not development aid". Russian forces have been in the region since 2017, and government relations date back to the Cold War. Wagner forces have been sent to fight in the Sahel, and they were first deployed to fight in Mali in December 2021, in exchange for reserves of gold and other resources. The Mali government had officially requested help from Wagner after the military junta took power. Russian forces have also provided training and expertise in countries like Sudan, Burkina Faso, CAR, Chad, Niger, and Libya with the stated role of cementing the local government's influence and fighting jihadists. They have also committed numerous atrocities, and far from decreasing violence, it seems violence has only increased in the region, further cementing their need.

Russia is also working to decrease Western powers to mineral resources in the countries.

In July 2025, the conference "Africa and France at the Crossroads: An Essential Dialogue to Rethink Franco-African Relations" was organized in France by the Association of Grand Orient Lodges.

In May 2026, France held its Africa summit, named "Africa Forward," in Nairobi, Kenya – this was the first time the summit took place in a non-francophone country. President Macron announced a new strategy focused on co-investment rather than aid, stating that "the days of offering assistance are behind us." At the same summit, Macron announced €23 billion ($27bn) in investments from French and African companies, aiming to create 250,000 jobs.

== Features from the Cold War ==
=== African cell ===
Decisions on France's African policies have been the responsibility (or domaine réservé in French) of French presidents since 1958. They, along with their close advisors, formed the African cell, which made decisions on African countries without engaging in broader discussions with the French Parliament and civil society actors such as non-governmental organisations. Instead, the African cell worked closely with powerful business networks and the French secret service.

The African cell's founding father, Jacques Foccart, was appointed by President Charles de Gaulle. He became a specialist on African matters at the Élysée Palace. Between 1986 and 1992, Jean-Christophe Mitterrand, the son of President François Mitterrand and a former AFP journalist in Africa, held the position of chief advisor on African policy at the African cell. He was nicknamed Papamadi (translated as 'Daddy told me'). He was appointed as a diplomatic advisor on Africa but the difference in titles was only symbolic. Subsequently, Claude Guéant served as Africa Advisor to President Sarkozy. In 2017, President Macron appointed Franck Paris to the same role.

=== Franc zone ===
The franc zone, a currency union in sub-Saharan Africa, was established when the CFA franc (or franc de la Communauté Financière Africaine) was created in 1945 as a colonial currency for over a dozen of France's African colonies. The zone continued to exist even after the colonies had achieved their independence in the early 1960s, with only three African countries ever leaving the zone, mostly for reasons of national prestige. One of the three countries, Mali, rejoined the zone in 1984. The CFA franc was pegged to the French franc, and now the euro, and its convertibility is guaranteed by the French Treasury. Despite sharing the same exchange rate, the CFA franc is actually two currencies, the Central African CFA franc and the West African CFA franc, which are run by their respective central banks in Central and West Africa. The foreign exchange reserves of member countries are pooled and each of the two African central banks keeps 65% of its foreign reserves with the French Treasury.

The franc zone was intended to provide African countries with monetary stability, with member countries such as Ivory Coast experiencing relatively low inflation at an average rate of 6% over the past 50 years compared to 29% in neighboring Ghana, a non-member country. Moreover, the fixed exchange rate between the CFA Franc and the French franc has changed only once in 1994 when the CFA franc was considered overvalued. However, this monetary arrangement has enabled France to control the money supply of the CFA franc and to influence the decision-making process of the African central banks through their boards.

The parity of the CFA franc to the euro has allowed French companies and French people to buy African resources (e.g., cocoa, coffee, gold, uranium, etc.) without having to pay any foreign currency. It also serves as a guaranty for French investments in the region as the CFA franc is pegged on the euro, meaning that there is little risk of monetary fluctuation. Many French corporations, such as TotalEnergies, Orange, or Bouygues, have used this free movement of capital to bring back profits made in these 14 countries without any typical risk associated to foreign currency exchanges.

Critics of the CFA franc also point to the structure of the CFA franc to euro convertibility as being unfair, since the economic cycles happening inside the Eurozone differ from those happening in the UEMOA and the CEMAC. This indirectly leaves the 14 African states subject to EU dynamics in terms of monetary policy. Nonetheless, while the European Central Bank's main mission is to control inflation in the EU, most African states' present priorities are creating jobs and investing in infrastructures, which are policies driving inflation. Therefore, some say that the convertibility of the CFA franc is a disservice to the development of African nations.

Experts also denounce the CFA franc as a symbol of persistent French monetary dominance in Africa.

In May 2025, activists, economists and civil society representatives opposed to the use of the CFA franc will organize conferences and meetings across African capitals.

On 16 May 2025, a demonstration dubbed "5,000 young people march for Cheikh Anta Diop" brought thousands of protesters to the streets of Dakar, Senegal. The demonstration was led by pan-Africanist movements, whose demands included the abandonment of the CFA franc as "a neocolonial currency and a demand for financial reparations from France for centuries of exploitation of Africa".

=== Cooperation accords ===
In the early 1960s, French governments had developed a discourse around the concept of coopération, or "post-independence relationship". This concept was linked to the effort of spreading French influence across the world such as promoting French language and culture, securing markets for French goods and projecting French power. It was to be achieved outside of a traditional colonial context whereby sovereign states such as France and the newly independent African countries would work together for mutual benefit. The concept of coopération also appealed to France's sense of historic responsibility to advance the development of its former colonial "family". To that end, France signed cooperation accords with its former colonies, which provided them with cultural, technical and military assistance, such as sending French teachers and military advisors to work for the newly formed African governments. The accords also allowed France to maintain troops in Chad, Djibouti, Gabon, Ivory Coast and Senegal, and to establish a framework that would allow France to intervene militarily in the region. The French presence abroad has long been manifested by military bases in various partner countries or former French African colonies. Thanks to these military bases in Africa, France can claim a free extraterritorial zone.

In the aftermath of World War Two, France took steps to create a military nuclear program. In principle, this would have allowed it to protect itself from the Soviet threat in the East, but also to guarantee peace in Europe and a certain independence from the United States. However, to do this, France needed a stable supply of uranium, so they signed a cooperation agreement with Niger in the early 1960s to get access to the African state's uranium reserves. This agreement was a priority for then President Charles de Gaulle who wished to compete with the largest nuclear powers.

From 1970 to 1981, the French military cooperation budget constituted 11 to 19% of the entire coopération budget. Under President de Gaulle, French aid and assistance were made contingent on the signing of these accords. For example, when Guinea refused to sign the accords, France immediately withdrew its personnel from Guinea and terminated all assistance to that country. The implementation of these accords was the responsibility of Jacques Foccart, Secretary-General for African and Malagasy Affairs under Presidents Charles de Gaulle and Georges Pompidou. In 1987, France was the largest source of development aid to sub-Saharan Africa, providing up to 18% of total aid to the region, followed by the World Bank (13%), Italy (8.5%), United States (6.8%), Germany (6.8%), and the European Community (6.4%). All French aid was provided through the Ministry of Cooperation. France has benefited from its aid, trade and investments in Africa, which has consistently generated a positive balance of payment in France's favour.

Defense cooperation agreements were renegotiated after 2008. Only Djibouti retained the clause stipulating that France "undertakes to contribute to the defense of the territorial integrity" of the country. In contrast, the other West and Central African countries adopted partnership or cooperation agreements.

=== Military interventions ===
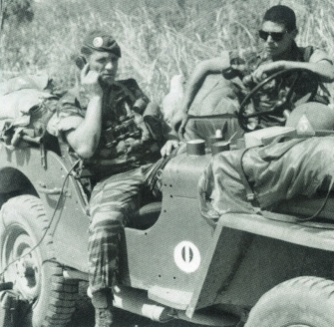
French radio operator in a jeep during Operation Léopard

After decolonisation, France established formal defence agreements with many francophone countries in sub-Saharan Africa. These arrangements allowed France to establish itself as a guarantor of stability and hegemony in the region. France adopted an interventionist policy in Africa, resulting in 122 military interventions that averaged once a year from 1960 to the mid-1990s and included countries such as Benin (Operation Verdier in 1991), Central African Republic (Operation Barracuda in 1979 and Operation Almandin in 1996), Chad (Opération Bison in 1968–72, Opération Tacaud in 1978, Operation Manta in 1983 and Opération Épervier in 1986), Comoros (Operation Oside in 1989 and Operation Azalee in 1995), Democratic Republic of Congo (Operation Léopard in 1978 and Operation Baumier in 1991 when it was Zaire, and Operation Artemis in 2003), Djibouti (Operation Godoria in 1991), Gabon (1964 and Operation Requin in 1990), Ivory Coast (Opération Licorne in 2002), Mauritania (Opération Lamantin in 1977), Republic of Congo (Opération Pélican in 1997), Rwanda (Operation Noroît in 1990–93, Operation Amaryllis in 1994 and Opération Turquoise in 1994), Togo (1986), Senegal (preventing a coup d'état in 1962) and Sierra Leone (Operation Simbleau in 1992). France often intervened to protect French nationals, to put down rebellions or prevent coups, to restore order or to support particular African leaders.

=== Personal networks ===
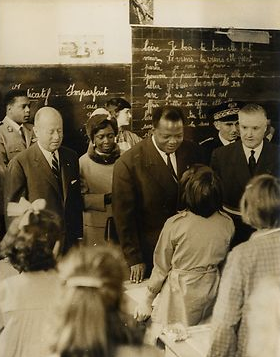
Jacques Foccart (left), Hubert Maga (center), and Guy Chavanne (right) visiting a school in Torcy, Seine-et-Marne in 1961

A central feature of Françafrique was that state-to-state relations between French and African leaders were informal and family-like, and were bolstered by a dense web of personal networks (or réseaux in French), whose activities were funded from the coopération budget. Jacque Foccart put in place these networks, which served as one of the main vehicles for the clientelist relations that France had maintained with its former African colonies. The activities of these networks were not subjected to parliamentary oversight or scrutiny, which led to corruption as politicians and officials became involved in business activities that resulted in state racketeering.

The blurring of state, party and personal interests made it possible for the informal, family-like relationships of the Franco-African bloc to benefit specific interest groups and small sections of French and African populations. For example, major French political parties have received funding from the recycling of part of the coopération budget, which secretly made its way to the party's coffers via Africa and from Elf, a French state-owned oil company, when it achieved its strategic objectives in Africa. African leaders and the small French-speaking elites to which they belonged also benefited from this informal relationship as it provided them with political, economic and military support.

=== Media ===
The French press, long seen as a bastion of freedom of expression, has often played a much less noble role when it comes to Africa. Behind a veneer of neutrality and objectivity, it has established itself as a strategic tool in the service of French neocolonial policy. By shaping narratives, amplifying certain voices and silencing others, it contributes to keeping Africa under the yoke of insidious domination. The French press has often been accused of being an extension of the economic and geopolitical interests of the French state. According to journalist and essayist François-Xavier Verschave, author of "La Françafrique: Le plus long scandale de la République," "the French media participate in the construction of a narrative that legitimizes economic predation and military interventions in Africa." This narrative is carefully crafted to justify the French presence on the continent under the guise of "stabilization" or "fighting international crime".

== Post–Cold War era ==
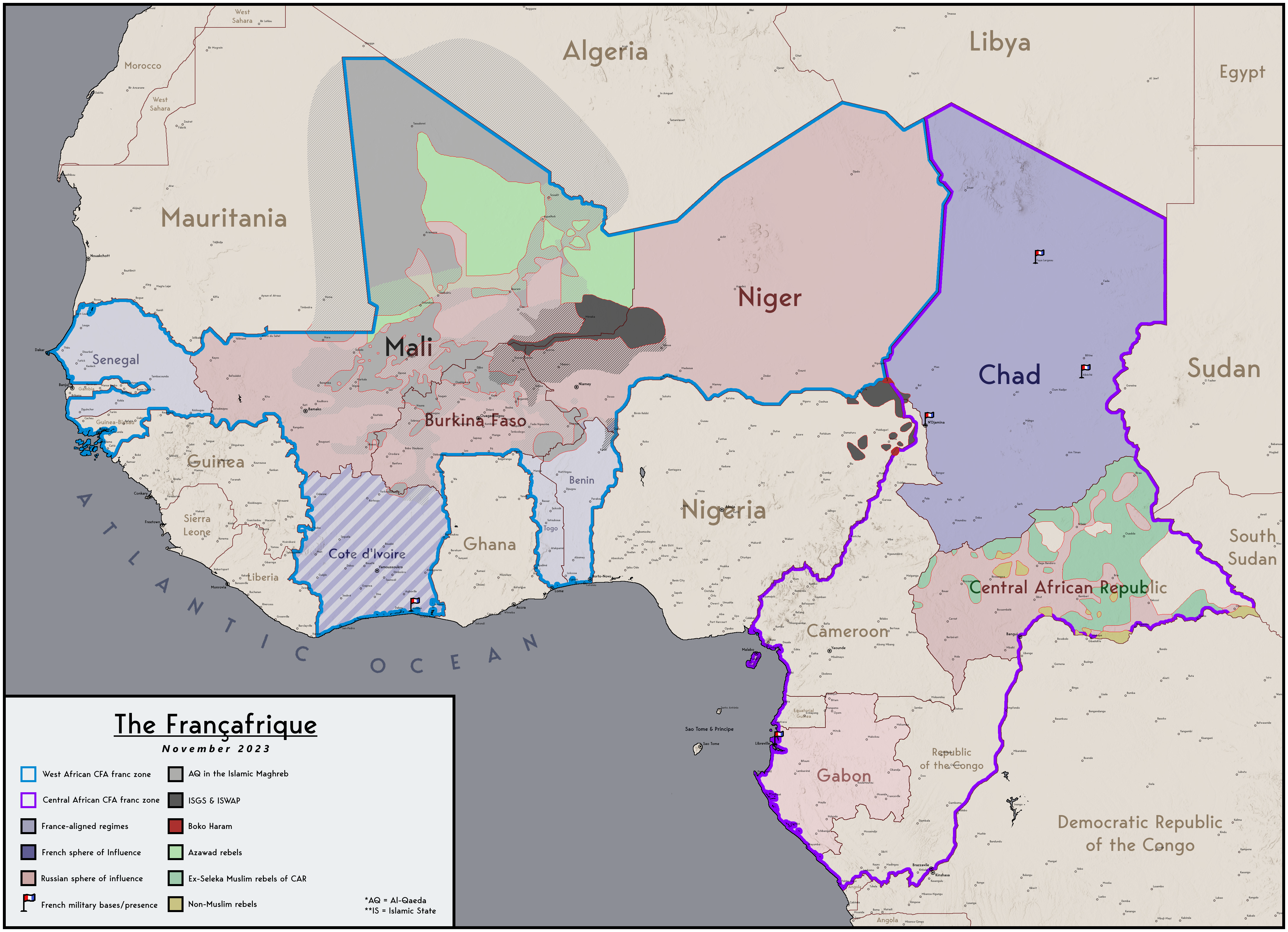
French sphere of influence in West Africa in November of 2023 (dark blue: significant French influence, red: Russian sphere of influence, cyan and purple borders: CFA franc zones)

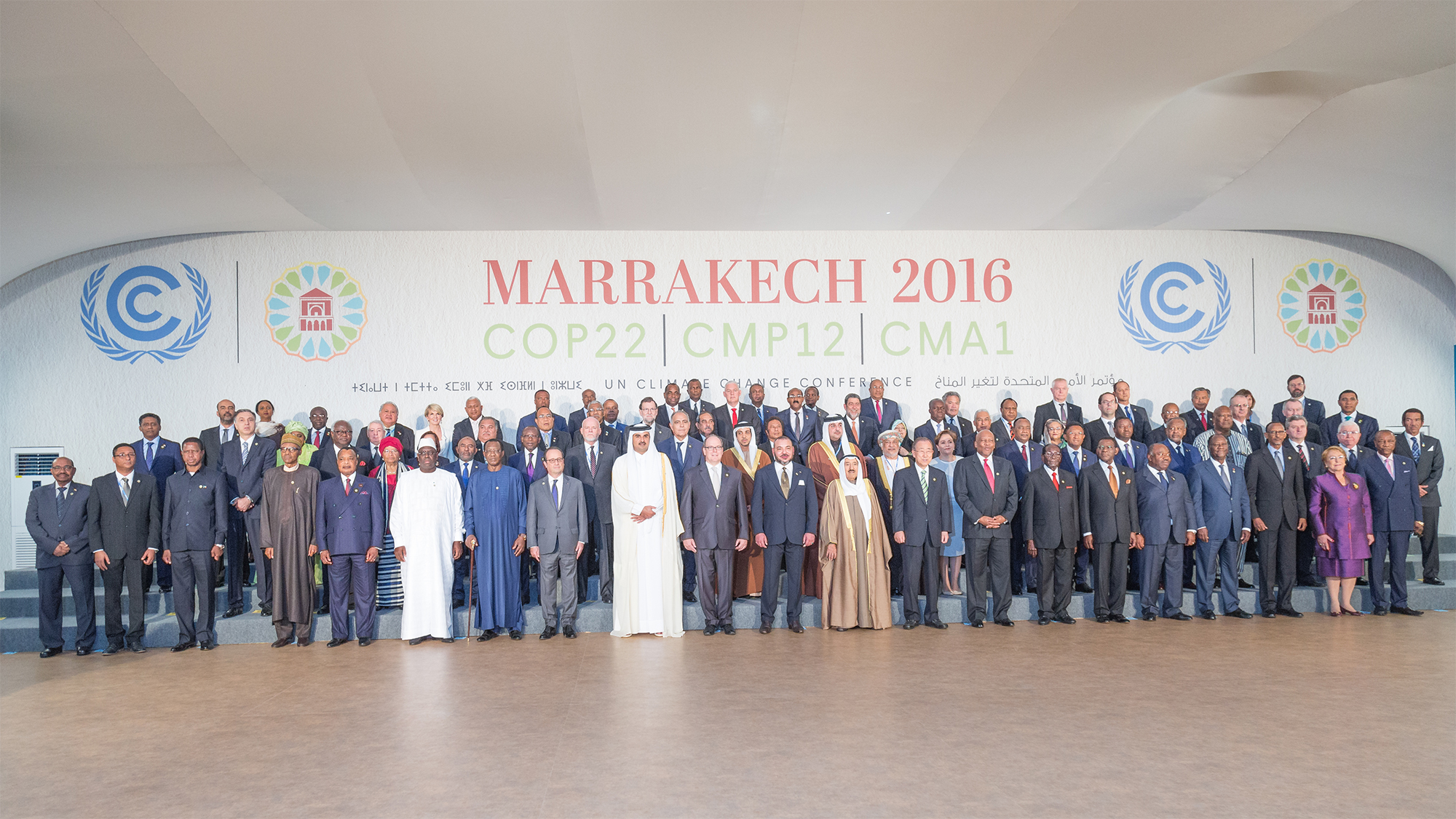
President of France François Hollande with King Mohammed VI of Morocco and other world leaders in Marrakesh

The Françafrique regime was at its height from 1960 to 1992 but after the Cold War, it has weakened due to France's budgetary constraints, greater public scrutiny at home, the deaths of pivotal Françafrique figures and the integration of France into the European Union. Economic liberalisation, high indebtedness and political instability of the former African colonies have reduced their political and economic attractiveness, leading France to adopt a more pragmatic and hard-nosed approach to its African relations. Furthermore, many of the dense web of informal networks that bound France to Africa have declined.

The pre-1990 aid regime of the old Françafrique, which has made the sub-Saharan African countries economically dependent on France has now given way to a new regime that is supposed to promote self-sufficiency as well as political and economic liberalism. France has also adopted the Abidjan doctrine, which has internationalised the economic dependency of African countries by having them first reach an agreement with the International Monetary Fund (IMF) before receiving French aid. This in turn has decreased the French government's ability to manoeuvre freely to pursue its own distinctive African policy. As a result, the old Franco-African bloc has now splintered, with France adopting a new style of relationship with its former African colonies.

France has made efforts to reduce its military footprint in Africa by making multilateral arrangements with African and European states. French President François Hollande started his tenure with a commitment to non-interventionism. However, a year later, France intervened in Mali at the request of the Malian government, sending 4,000 troops (see Operation Serval, then Operation Barkhane). According to a 2020 study, "France's commitment to multilateralism is genuine yet not absolute—meaning that French policy-makers do not shy away from operational unilateralism if conditions on the ground seem to require swift and robust military action, as long as they can count on the political support of key international partners."

The French Development Agency (AFD) and Caisse des Dépôts et des Consignations (CDC) signed a strategic alliance charter in December 2016, one of the financial drivers of which is the creation of a €500 million investment fund. This fund is used to finance infrastructure projects in Africa, in various sectors (energy, telecommunications, etc.). Some critics, however, point to the fund's strategy of creating opportunities and opening the market to mostly French companies, thus feeding capital transfer bridges that are the roots of Françafrique.

The arrest of Senegalese opposition leader and member of Parliament Ousmane Sonko for allegations of rape, in Senegal, in March 2021, shook the country. Senegalese people, especially young ones, critiqued the lack of transparency of the proceedings, and saw this as a political maneuver orchestrated by President Macky Sall to suppress the opposition before the next presidential elections in Senegal. Protesters took to the streets, and days of chaos ensued. Among their grievances, people blamed Sall for leaning too much towards France, giving too many opportunities to French companies when local businesses could step in. To manifest this frustration protesters targeted French corporate symbols such as Auchan supermarkets, Orange stores, and TotalEnergies gas stations. Some protesters also committed looting and destroyed property. These companies were accused by protesters of reaping benefits from the hands of Senegalese people.

On 21 December 2019, French President Emmanuel Macron and Ivorian President Alassane Ouattara announced in a press conference that they had signed a new cooperation accord replacing that of 1973. This agreement replaced the West African CFA franc with the Eco, the new currency for the Economic Community of West African States (ECOWAS). This will only apply to countries belonging to the West African Economic and Monetary Union (UEMOA) which includes Benin, Burkina Faso, Guinea-Bissau, Ivory Coast, Mali, Niger, Senegal, and Togo, and not to member states of the Economic and Monetary Community of Central Africa (CEMAC from its French appellation), which use the Central African CFA franc and includes Cameroon, the Central African Republic, Chad, Equatorial Guinea, Gabon, and the Republic of the Congo.

A bill approving the new cooperation accord was ratified on 10 November 2020, by the French National Assembly, and then by the French Senate on 28 January 2021. The text is composed of three main reforms: the change of currency from the CFA franc to the Eco, the abolition of the obligation to centralize 50% of the CFA franc reserves at the Banque of France, and the withdrawal of French representatives from the UEMOA's governing bodies (e.g., BCEAO's board, UMOA's banking commission, etc.).

In June 2021, Emmanuel Macron announced that Operation Barkhane was drawing down to be gradually replaced by the international Takuba Task Force. As of 2021, France retains the largest military presence in Africa of any former colonial power. The French presence has been complicated by other expanding spheres of influence in Africa such as those of Russia and China. In 2016, China's investment in Africa was $38.4 billion versus France's $7.7 billion. Russia has been seen as expanding opportunistically in Africa, with both the mercenary Wagner Group, with which the Kremlin has denied links, and official military agreements. Macron has accused Moscow and Ankara of fueling anti-French sentiment in the Central African Republic. One of the main emphases of France's continuing links in Africa is opposing Islamist militants in the Sahel.

Many former French colonies have experienced a growing anti-French sentiment in the past 30 years. This feeling, particularly present among the younger generations who have not experienced colonization or the period of independence, is also reinforced by events such as the genocide of the Tutsi in Rwanda, the civil war in Côte d'Ivoire or the crisis in Libya. While the older generation is more likely to support strong ties with France because they believe it brings stability, the younger generation sees it as a brake on the development of African states and businesses.

The Sahel is an area of land that serves as a demarcation line between Western and Central Africa. It is situated between the nations of Mali, Mauritania, Niger, Chad, and Burkina Faso, which are all former French colonies. In 2012, militant groups affiliated with Al-Qaeda attempted to seize parts of Mali with the intent to take control of other areas within the region. Due to these pertinent issues, the involvement of France has increased in order to provide military assistance to Sahelian countries. This is defined by Operation Serval, which was a French effort under the leadership of former president François Hollande in order to prevent Islamist militants from seizing Bamako, Mali. The success of this operation was short-lived as militant groups began to appear in neighboring nations, including Chad and Burkina Faso. By 2014, the French military sent over 5,000 troops to the Sahel under Operation Barkhane as a means to support governments throughout the region in their struggle against Islamist groups. As a result of these operations, French forces have only expanded their oversight throughout the Sahel.

The ongoing conflict between French-backed forces and Jihadist militant groups continues to have detrimental consequences, which have led to increased rates of death and displacement within the Sahel territories. In 2021 alone, almost 6,000 people died due to conflict-related deaths in Niger, Mali, and Burkina Faso. There are also increasing security concerns for coastal nations such as Benin and Senegal as militant groups advance further within the region's borders.

In November 2024, the special politician for French operations in Africa, Jean-Marie Bockel, submitted a report to President Emmanuel Macron on the reconfiguration of the French military presence in Africa. This report advocates a "renewed" and "rebuilt" partnership. France plans to reduce the pre-positioned forces it has on its military bases. The new terms of France's military presence in Africa provide for a significant reduction to maintain only a permanent liaison detachment and at the same time adapt the offer of military cooperation to the needs expressed by African countries.

Influencers said to be Pan-Africanist, supported by Russia, continued to spread anti-French sentiment via social media at the end of 2024, as previously in support of Wagner Group operations, according to the US State Department.

In April 2025, the "Ancrages" forum, organized by France, aims to renew relations between Africa and France. The forum focuses exclusively on economic diplomacy, territorial diplomacy, and the concrete promotion of the various State support mechanisms for creation and entrepreneurship in France and Africa.

=== Military operations in the Sahel ===
While the support of the French military continues to be a source of protection for countries in the Sahel, recent developments suggest that this reality may soon change. Despite the initial demand for military backing and aid in 2013 and 2014, public opinion has shown less enthusiasm for France's current involvement in the Sahel. People have grown increasingly critical of the French government's action, or lack thereof, in preventing further casualties and attacks by Islamic militant forces. Many have also opposed the strategy of the French military and its lasting presence, which echoes its former colonial past in these territories.

In February 2022, French President Emmanuel Macron announced the official withdrawal of military forces within Mali. His decision follows escalating tensions between the French and Malian governments, the latter of which rose to power through a series of military coups in both 2020 and 2021, respectively. Colonel Assimi Goïta is currently serving as interim president of Mali, with the intention to not hold elections until 2024, with the initial goal of not holding elections until 2027. Under Goïta's rule, Mali has signed a deal with the Wagner Group, a Russian military contractor, which has only heightened France's desire to distance itself from the area. These issues, alongside the removal of the French ambassador in the midst of electoral controversy, played a significant role in the nation's decision to remove its officials from Mali.

While a complete withdrawal of French troops in Mali is now evident, it raises further questions regarding the social and political instability within the Sahel region. Many governments, including Mali and Burkina Faso, lack the infrastructure necessary to combat militant groups from advancing their agendas, which leaves the ability to secure their borders in tandem. Subsequently, the French government is now searching for a means to continue its military presence in a neighboring country as a way to address military concerns while simultaneously furthering its influence upon the region.

On 28 November 2024, Chad terminated the defense and security cooperation agreement that has linked them since Chad's independence. On 10 December, France began the process of withdrawing its armies from Chad. On 10 January 2025, the Abéché military base was returned to Chad by France. In January 2025, the N'Djamena air military base begins to be emptied. The last air base in Chad, the Sergent Adji Kossei base, or commonly 172 Fort-Lamy, is being handed over, starting 31 January 2025.

On 31 December 2024, Senegal and Ivory Coast announced that they would end the presence of foreign forces in their country, particularly French forces, and would terminate their military cooperation and defense-security agreements with France. The status of the end of the presence of French forces in Senegal is planned for September 2025. On 7 March 2025, France returned several facilities used by the French army in Senegal, the first transferred as part of its military withdrawal from Senegal, where it had been present since 1960.

On 20 February 2025, France officially handed over its sole military base in Ivory Coast to local authorities, marking a significant shift in their bilateral relations. This decision aligns with France's broader strategy to reduce its military footprint in West Africa, following similar withdrawals from countries like Chad, Senegal, Mali, Niger, and Burkina Faso. The base, previously home to the 43rd Marine Infantry Battalion (43rd BIMA), has been transferred to Ivorian control and renamed Camp Thomas d'Aquin Ouattara, in honor of the nation's first army chief. This move reflects Ivory Coast's growing emphasis on national sovereignty and the modernization of its armed forces. France had occupied the Port-Bouët military base for more than 50 years.

On 1 July 2025, France handed over the Rufisque joint station to Senegal. This station, active since 1960, was responsible for communications on the southern Atlantic coast. It also served as a listening station in the fight against maritime trafficking. The handover was carried out without ceremony, limited to the signing of a report. The handover of the last remaining military infrastructure in Senegal to the Senegalese authorities occurred later that month. The two military sites were returned to the Senegalese government: the airport base and Camp Geille, a 5-hectare site located in Ouakam. Four villas located in Plateau, near the port, were also transferred. On 14 July 2025, Christine Fages, French Ambassador to Senegal, declared, "In accordance with the guidelines established in 2022 by President Macron, France will return to Senegal the military bases of the French elements in Senegal." The transfer occurred on 17 July.

Following the French military withdrawal from Africa, private military companies quickly offered their services to states wishing to outsource a wide range of missions ranging from logistical support, securing sites, training, and the protection of personalities.

=== Economic interests today ===
France's economic interests in Africa have remained important since the end of the Cold War. More than 40,000 French companies are active in Africa, dozens of which are large multinationals such as TotalEnergies, Areva, or Vinci. In fact, France's exports to Africa have increased from 13 billion dollars to 28 billion in the last 20 years, while French foreign direct investment has increased tenfold, from 5.9 billion euros in 2000 to 52.6 billion in 2017. However, while these investments and economic flows have increased, France's market share has drastically decreased since the early 2000s. Indeed, while French exports to Africa have doubled, the total size of the market has quadrupled (from 100 billion dollars to 400); France's market share has therefore been divided by 2 in 20 years.

While France remains a crucial player in the African market, its position has been compromised by other foreign investors such as China, who have recently showcased their interest in the continent. From 2010 to 2015, Chinese investors granted $2.5 billion in loans for infrastructure to Côte d'Ivoire alone. And their sights are set on the entirety of Francophone Africa as they seek new opportunities for development in the private sector. By the end of 2017, China's capital increased at a rate of 332% throughout the region. This leaves China in an economically advantageous position, thereby making their monetary gain a legitimate threat to French investors.

Although France's influence may be weakening throughout Francophone Africa, there also remains strong social and economic ties that link these nations together. One prime example can be displayed through the already established business deals with the French private sector in order to increase development in West Africa. An additional factor that connects France to its former colonies is their usage of the French language. Francophone African nations are placed at an economic advantage within European countries such as France, Switzerland, and Belgium due to their shared linguistic identities.

With increasingly younger populations, African countries are viewed as the ideal candidates for long-term investment by international actors. This sentiment directly reflects France's approach to its former colonies, which comprise over half of its primary trade exports. This includes West African countries such as Senegal and Cameroon, which continue to play an integral role in supplying natural resources, hardware, and manufactured goods. Despite these staggering numbers, France remains in a vulnerable position as it renounces its title as the top investor in the region. The prospect of foreign backers and the appeal of Intra-African trade opportunities have encouraged West African nations to reclaim their economic agency from their former occupiers. Ultimately, these circumstances have contributed to France's declining economic influence.

Currently, French companies are less linked to Africa, or at least to the countries that were formerly colonies of France. France's main economic partners in Africa are indeed the Maghreb countries (Morocco, Algeria, Tunisia), Nigeria, South Africa, and Angola. Some critics of French foreign policy in Africa question the deep commitment that France has with the former French colonies, particularly in sub-Saharan Africa, given the low financial and commercial interest that the countries of the CFA franc zone represent for French companies.

On 6 June 2023 French Foreign Minister Catherine Colonna said France wants to remain a "relevant partner" in Africa despite "anti-French rhetoric" while presenting the country's foreign policy in Africa to the Senate.

=== Scattered Islands in the Indian Ocean ===
The Scattered Islands in the Indian Ocean are partially claimed by the Comoros, Madagascar, and Mauritius. The Malagasy and Mauritian claims, however, are significantly later than their access to independence. However, the agreement reached in October 2024 between the United Kingdom and Mauritius to transfer the British Indian Ocean Territory to Mauritian sovereignty has relaunched the debate in Madagascar.

== Opposition ==
The Alliance of Sahel States between Burkina Faso, Mali and Niger is anti-French in outlook and anti-neocolonialism, demonstrated with acts including downgrading the status of the French language and renaming of colonial street names.

- Kémi Séba
- Nathalie Yamb
- Alliance of Sahel States

== Cultural references ==
=== Film ===
- Françafrique (2010), movie by Patrick Benquet
- Le Professionnel (1981), action film by Georges Lautner
- Fratricide in Burkina: Thomas Sankara and French Africa (2008) by Didier Mauro and Thuy-Tiën Ho

=== Music ===
- Françafrique, album and song by Tiken Jah Fakoly
- Pompafric, song by Tryo
- Françafrique, song by Refused

=== Literature ===
- Mme Bâ (2003), novel by Érik Orsenna

== See also ==
- Hispaniola, a modern-day country of Haiti was geographically in the Caribbean Sea outside of French Africa (or "Francophone Africa")
- France–Africa relations
- Hispanic Africa
- Monroe Doctrine
