= Raymond Depardon =

French photographer, photojournalist and documentary filmmaker

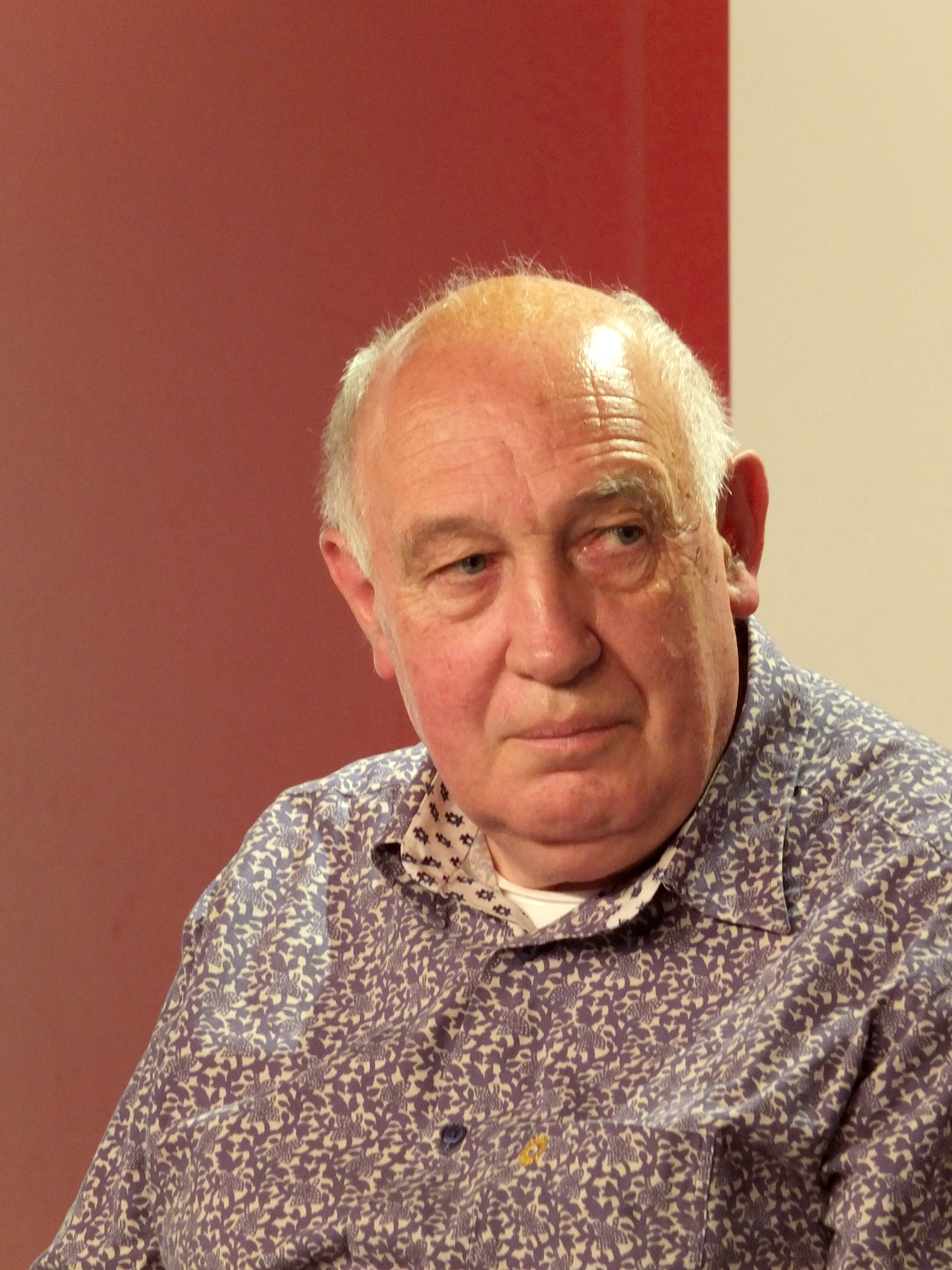
- Raymond Depardon in 2012
- Born: Raymond Depardon; 6 July 1942 (age 83); Villefranche-sur-Saône, France
- Occupations: Photographer, photojournalist and documentary filmmaker
- Spouse: Claudine Nougaret

Raymond Depardon (French: [ʁɛmɔ̃ dəpaʁdɔ̃]; born 6 July 1942) is a French photographer, photojournalist and documentary filmmaker.

== Early life ==
Depardon was born in Villefranche-sur-Saône, France.

== Photographer ==
Depardon is a mainly self-taught photographer, as he began taking pictures on his family's farm when he was 12. He apprenticed with a photographer-optician in Villefranche-sur-Saône before he moved to Paris in 1958. He began his career as a photojournalist in the early 1960s. He travelled to conflict zones including Algeria, Vietnam, Biafra and Chad. In 1966, Depardon co-founded the photojournalism agency Gamma. In 1973 he became Gamma's director. From 1975 to 1977, Depardon traveled in Chad. The following year, he left Gamma to become a Magnum Photos associate, then a full member in 1979. In the 1990s, Depardon returned to his parents' farm to photograph rural landscapes in color and, in 1996, published a black and white road journal, In Africa.

In May 2012, he took the official portrait of French President François Hollande.

== Director ==
Depardon is also the author of several documentary shorts and feature films. His approach as a director is influenced by cinéma vérité and direct cinema. In 1969 he made his first film (about Jan Palach) and he has directed 16 films since then. In 1984 Depardon made his first fiction film, Empty Quarters. Other notable examples include 1974, une partie de campagne, on the 1974 presidential campaign of Valéry Giscard d'Estaing, Reporters (1981) and New York, N.Y. (1986), La captive du désert (1990) and Caught in the Acts (Délits flagrants) (1994).

== Publications ==
- Beyrouth, Centre Ville: inédit. Points. ISBN 978-2757819777
- Paysans. Contemporary French Fiction. ISBN 978-2757815649
- San Clemente. Diffusion Weber, 1984. ISBN 978-2867540196
- En Afrique = In Africa. Steidl, 1996. ISBN 978-2020260947
- Errance. Steidl, 2000. ISBN 978-2020386876
- Le Tour Du Monde En 14 Jours. 7 Escales, 1 Visa. 2008. ISBN 978-2757811382
- La terre des paysans. Steidl, 2008. ISBN 978-2020976312
- Manhattan Out. Steidl Photography International, 2009. ISBN 978-3865217042
- Native Land. Fondation Cartier pour l'art contemporain, Paris. 2009. ISBN 978-0500976883
- La France de Raymond Depardon. Steidl, 2010. ISBN 978-2021009941
- Repérages. Steidl, 2012. ISBN 978-2021090604
- Berlin. Steidl, 2014. ISBN 978-2021140941
- Adieu Saigon. Steidl, 2015. ISBN 978-3869309224
- Glasgow. Steidl, 2016. ISBN 978-2021303629
- La Solitude Heureuse Du Voyageur: Précédé De Notes. Points, 2017. ISBN 978-2757867631
- Bolivia. Thames & Hudson, 2018. ISBN 978-2869251304
- Le Desert Americain. Hazan, 2019. ISBN 978-2754102322
- Manicomio: Secluded Madness
- Paris Journal
- PPP: Photographies De Personnalités Politiques
- Afriques
- villes, cities, städte
- Désert, Un Homme Sans L'occident
- Un moment si doux
- Depardon Voyages
- Détours
- La ferme du Garet
- Return to Vietnam
- Depardon Cinéma
- 100 Photos Pour Defendre La Liberté De La Presse

== Filmography ==
- Venezuela (1963)
- Israel (1967)
- Biafra (1968)
- Jan Palach (1969/I)
- Tchad 1: L'embuscade (1970)
- Yemen: Arabie heureuse (1973)
- 1974, une partie de campagne (1974)
- Tchad 2 (1975)
- Tibesti Too (1976)
- Tchad 3 (1976)
- Dix minutes de silence pour John Lennon (1980)
- Numéros zéros (1980)
- Reporters (1981)
- Piparsod (1982/I)
- San Clemente (1982)
- News Items (1983) (French: Faits divers)
- Les Années déclic (1984)
- Empty Quarter (Une femme en Afrique) (1985)
- New York, N.Y. (1986)
- Urgences (1988)
- Le Petit Navire (1988) – short film
- Une histoire très simple (1989)
- Contacts (1990)
- Captive of the Desert (French: La captive du désert (1990)
- Contre l'oubli (1991) (segment "Pour Alirio de Jesus Pedraza Becerra, Colombie")
- Contacts (1990) – short film
- Cartagena (1993) – short film
- Face à la mer (1993) – short film
- Montage (1994)
- Caught in the Acts (1994)
- À propos de Nice, la suite (1995) (segment "Prom, La'")
- Paroles d'appelés (1995) – short film
- La Prom' (1995) – short film
- Lumière and Company (1995) (French: Lumière et compagnie)
- Malraux (1996)
- Afriques : comment ça va avec la douleur ? (1996)
- Amour (1997) – short film
- Paris (1998)
- Bolivie (1998) – short film made with Claudine Nougaret
- Un amour qui m'irait bien (1998) – vidéo clip de Véronique Sanson
- Muriel Leferle (1999)
- Emmaüs Mouvement (1949-1999 : Emmaüs a 50 ans) (1999)
- Déserts (2000) – short film
- Profils paysans: L'Approche = Profiles farmers: the approach (2001)
- Un homme sans l'Occident (2002)
- Chasseurs et Chamans (2003) – short film
- Quoi de neuf au Garet? (2004)
- 10e chambre, instants d'audience (2004)
- Profils paysans: Le Quotidien = Profiles farmers: the daily life (2005)
- To Each His Own Cinema (French: Chacun son cinéma ou Ce petit coup au coeur quand la lumière s'éteint et que le film commence) (2007) – a collection of short films, Depardon's contribution being Cinéma d'été (Open-Air Cinema)
- Cinéma d'été (2007) – short film
- Profils paysans: La vie moderne = Profiles farmers: modern life (2008) (English: Modern Life)
- Donner la parole (2008)
- La France de Raymond Depardon (2010) – short film made with Claudine Nougaret
- Au bonheur des maths (2011) – short film made with Nougaret
- Journal de France (2012)
- Les habitants (2016)
- 12 jours (2017)

== Awards for films ==
- 1979: George Sadoul Prize for Numéro Zéro
- Winner, César Award for best short documentary for Reporters (1981)
- Winner, César Award for best short documentary for New York, N.Y. (1986)
- La captive du désert (1990) was nominated for the Palme d'Or at the 1990 Cannes Film Festival,
- Winner, best feature documentary at the César Awards for Caught in the Acts (Délits flagrants) (1994)
- Joris Ivens award, Caught in the Acts (Délits flagrants) (1994) the International Documentary Film Festival Amsterdam
- Caught in the Acts (Délits flagrants) (1994) Vancouver International Film Festival
- 2000: Dragon of Dragons, a lifetime achievement award, Kraków Film Festival
