= Michigan State University Press =

Scholarly publishing press at Michigan State University

- Parent company: Michigan State University
- Founded: 1947
- Country of origin: United States
- Headquarters location: East Lansing, Michigan
- Distribution: Chicago Distribution Center
- Publication types: Books, Academic journals
- Official website: msupress.org

Michigan State University Press is the scholarly publishing arm of Michigan State University. Scholarly publishing at the university significantly predates the establishment of its press in 1947. By the 1890s the institution's Experiment Stations began issuing a broad range of influential publications in the natural sciences (including a beautifully illustrated Birds of Michigan in 1892) and as early as 1876, professor A.J. Cook commissioned a Lansing printer to issue his popular Manual of the Apiary, which ran through numerous editions and remained in print for nearly half a century.

Located on the MSU campus in East Lansing, the press publishes principally in the areas of the humanities, sciences, and social sciences, with special emphasis in African studies, African American studies, American studies, American Indian studies, creative nonfiction, environmental science, and natural history, Great Lakes studies, immigration studies, Latino studies, politics and the global economy, poetry, US history, urban studies, and women's studies. The press currently issues some 40 new titles a year and publishes nine scholarly journals, with a backlist of over 600 active titles. Beginning in 2008, the press has moved aggressively in the area of digital distribution, and nearly all new titles are simultaneously available electronically.

== See also ==
- List of English-language book publishing companies
- List of university presses
