= List of people from the Republic of the Congo =

This is a list of Congolese people.

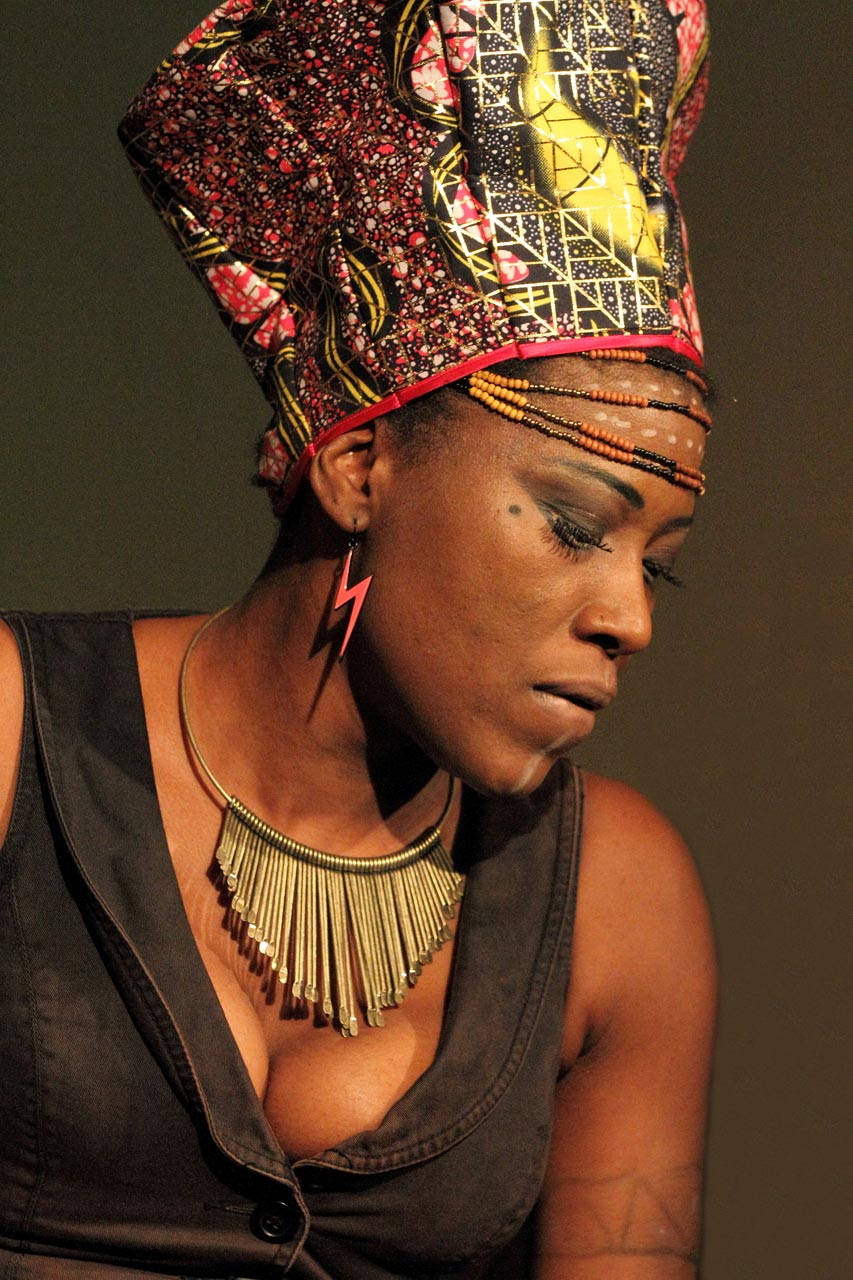
Niasony

- Kevin Andzouana, footballer
- Hilaire Babassana
- Benoît Bati, politician
- Fidèle Dimou
- Junior Etou (born 1994), basketball player
- Raymond Isaac Follo, politician
- Pascal Gamassa, politician
- Alphonse Gondzia
- Serge Ibaka, basketball player
- Marcel Kalla, politician
- Ernest Kombo
- Bill Kouélany
- Jean-Pierre Lékoba
- Alphonse Massemba-Débat
- Justin Ballay Mégot
- Émile Mokoko Wongolo
- Jean-Marie Mokoko
- Isidore Mvouba
- Alexis Ndinga, politician
- Marien Ngouabi
- Denis Sassou Nguesso
- Niasony
- Dominique Ntsiété
- Émilienne Raoul
- Sony Lab'ou Tansi
- Omer Yengo, FIFA international football referee
- Patrice Yengo
- Fulbert Youlou
- Madzengue Younous

== See also ==
- List of Republic of the Congo artists
- List of Republic of the Congo writers
- List of people by nationality
