= Femmes-Caïmans =

Femmes-Caïmans was a women's organization in the Congo-Brazzaville, the women's wing of the UDDIA party led by Fulbert Youlou. Youlou had assisted the funding of the organization in 1956. The organization was named after the cayman, which was the symbol of UDDIA. Pauline Madieta was the president of Femmes-Caïmans.

Femmes-Caïmans were amongst the most active political organizations in Brazzaville during 1957–1960, and was able to recruit illiterate women. As of 1960, the organization had around 250 members in Brazzaville.
