= Jean-Pierre Mafouana =

Republic of the Congo politician

Jean-Pierre Mafouana is a politician from Congo-Brazzaville.

Mafouana was born in Yembo (near Kakamoéka) on October 6, 1934. He was known as 'Defos'. He worked as a supervisor of the private schools of the Catholic mission in Tchiobo. He was a member of the private education teachers union, affiliated to Confédération africaine des travailleurs croyants de l'A.E.F (CATC).

Mafouana was elected to the Legislative Assembly (which later became the National Assembly of the Republic of the Congo) in the 1959 election, standing as a candidate of the Democratic Union for the Defense of African Interests (UDDIA) in Point-Noire. In the National Assembly, he served as rapporteur of the Economic Affairs and Planning Commission. He was appointed ambassador in 1962. He served as director for primary schools and as assistant mayor for Tié-Tié. Mafouana was the deputy mayor of Pointe-Noire.

In 2018 L'Harmattan Congo-Brazzaville published Mafouana's collection of poetry titled Couleurs tropicales.
