= Modeste Boukadia =

Congolese politician

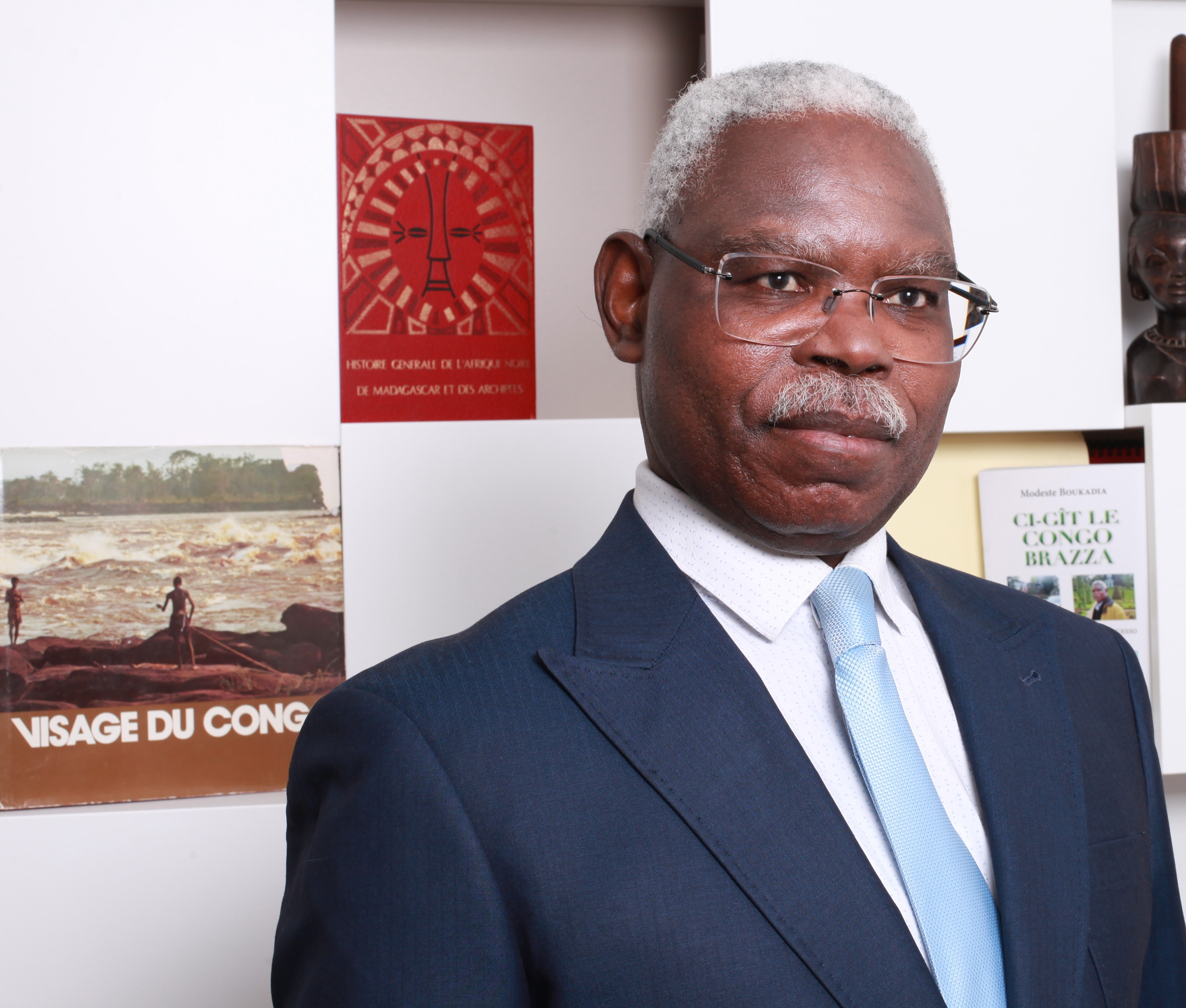

Modeste Boukadia (born 1954) is a Congolese political figure from the Republic of the Congo and the prominent leader of the self-proclaimed State of South Congo. Known for his active involvement in Congolese politics, Boukadia has been a vocal advocate for political reform and human rights.

== Early life and political career ==
Boukadia was born in 1954 and became involved in Congolese politics as a young man. In 1993, he founded the Cercle des démocrates et républicains du Congo (CDRC) party, marking the beginning of his political career. Over the years, Boukadia has consistently positioned himself as an opponent to the government of President Denis Sassou Nguesso.

Boukadia contested the Congolese presidential elections in both July 1997 and July 2009, running as a candidate from the CDRC. His political platform focused on addressing the political, economic, social, and financial crises facing Congo (Brazzaville) at the time.

== Political activism and advocacy ==
Beyond his involvement in national politics, Boukadia has a diverse background. He served as a former member of the political commission of the Sovereign National Conference in 1991 and as an associate member of IPDF (Professional Engineers of France).

Additionally, Boukadia has been involved in various associations, including serving as the founding president of the GABA association ("Action Group, implementation of the Central Bank of Africa, for the promotion of the African Union, democracy, and human rights") and as a founding member of the Brazzaville capital of Free France association.

== Arbitrary imprisonment and persecution ==
Boukadia faced significant challenges due to his political activism. In 2014, following a protest march, he was sentenced (in absentia) to 30 years of forced labor. This arbitrary imprisonment led to his detention for 575 days in the Pointe-Noire Remand Prison, where he reportedly endured physical, moral, and psychological torture, including an attempted assassination.

Despite these challenges, Boukadia remains steadfast in his commitment to political change and democracy in Congo (Brazzaville).

== Current initiatives and vision ==
Boukadia advocates for the convening of an International Conference and the Round Table to build the National Union envisioned by the Founding Fathers of the Republic. This initiative, inspired by the ideals of Presidents Fulbert Youlou and Jacques Opangault, aims to address the stability and development of Congo in the face of financial challenges and a significant national debt.

== State of South Congo ==
Boukadia emerged as a central figure in the declaration of the State of South Congo on April 14, 2014. The proclamation, formalized through the Request for Declaration of the State of South Congo, addressed perceived injustices, ethnic cleansing, and genocide against the civilian population in the southern regions of the Republic of Congo.

As the leader of the State of South Congo, Boukadia continues to play a role in advocating for the rights and autonomy of the southern regions.

Proclamation of Independence: The independence of the State of South Congo was proclaimed through the aforementioned declaration, marking a significant moment in the ongoing political dynamics of the region. The signatories, led by Boukadia, accused President Denis Sassou Nguesso and his Mbochi clan of ethnical cleansing and planned destruction in the southern parts of the country.
