= Ndinga =

Ndinga is a Congolese surname. Notable people with the surname include:

- Alexis Ndinga, Congolese politician
- Antoine Ndinga Oba (1941–2005), Congolese diplomat, political figure, and linguist
- Delvin Ndinga (born 1988), Congolese footballer
- Pierre Ndinga (born 1958), Congolese sprinter
- Rock Itoua-Ndinga (born 1983), Congolese footballer
