= List of foreign delegations at the 11th congress of the Socialist Unity Party of Germany =

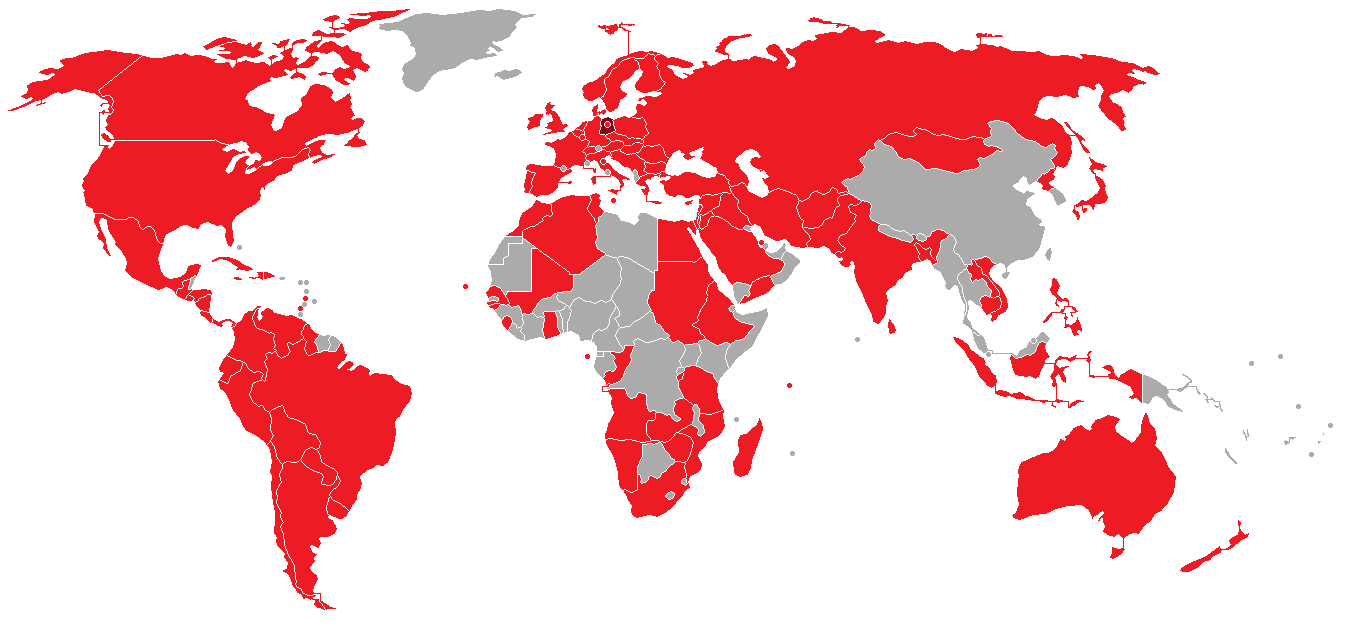
Countries represented with delegations at 11th party congress of the Socialist Unity Party of Germany (SED), held in April 1986

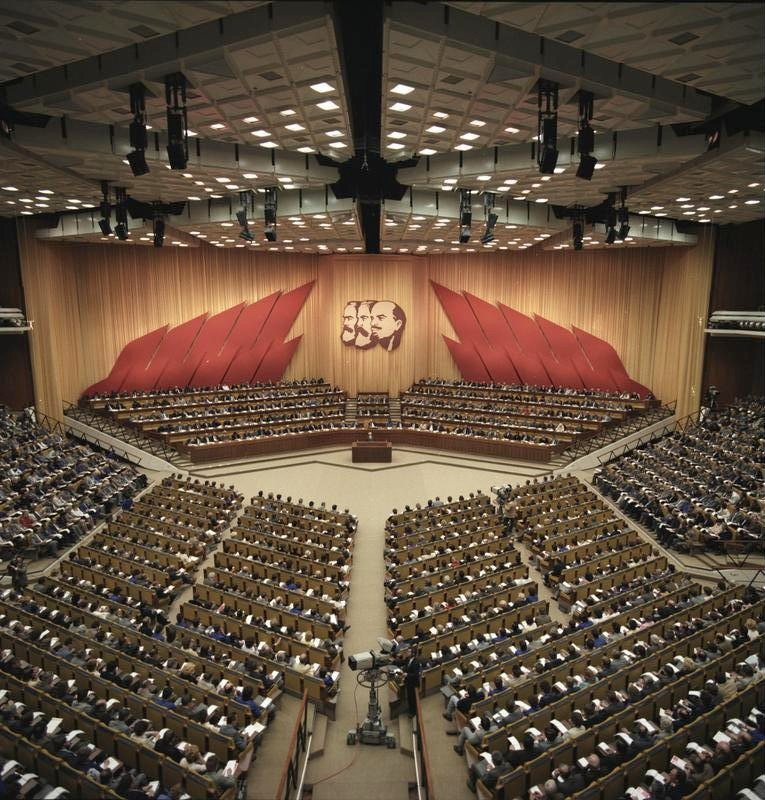
Opening session of the 11th party congress in the Palace of the Republic

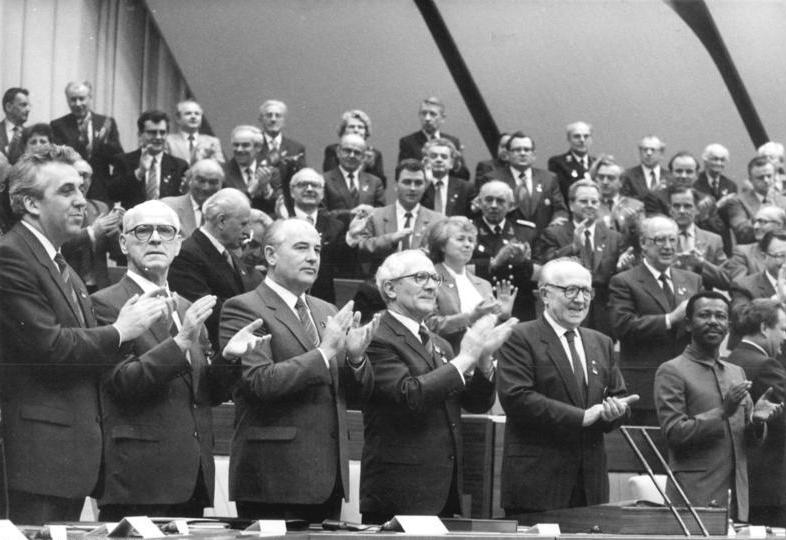
Opening session of the 11th party congress, with SED leaders and international guests at the podium. From the left in the front row Egon Krenz, Willi Stoph, Mikhail Gorbachev, Erich Honecker, Horst Sindermann, Mengistu Haile Mariam

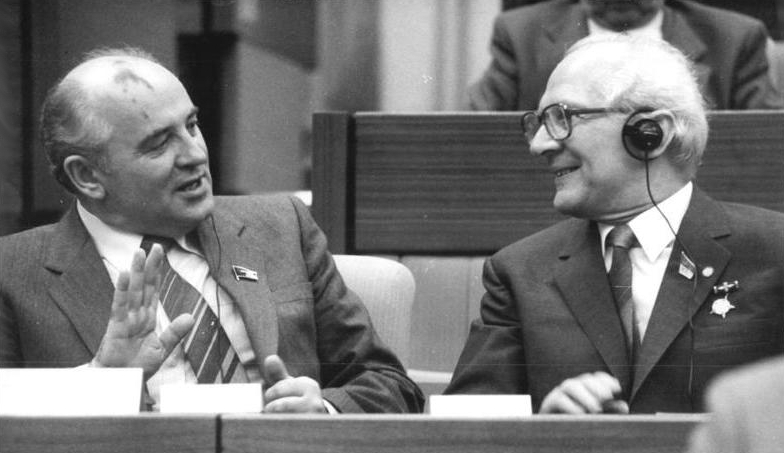
Soviet leader Mikhail Gorbachev and Erich Honecker at the 11th SED Congress

The 11th party congress of the Socialist Unity Party of Germany (SED), held in Berlin April 17–21 1986, was attended by 141 foreign delegations from 104 countries (143 delegations per one source). The foreign delegations included the delegation of the Communist Party of the Soviet Union, headed by Mikhail Gorbachev.

The 11th SED party congress took place less than two months after the 27th Congress of the Communist Party of the Soviet Union. Furthermore, the 11th SED party congress took place within a span of various other congresses of ruling parties of the Socialist Bloc - the 3rd congress of the Communist Party of Cuba (February 1986), the 17th congress of the Communist Party of Czechoslovakia (March 1986), the 13th congress of the Bulgarian Communist Party (April 1986), the 19th congress of the Mongolian People's Revolutionary Party (May 1986), the 10th congress of the Polish United Workers' Party (July 1986), the 4th congress of the Lao People's Revolutionary Party (November 1986) and the 6th congress of the Communist Party of Vietnam (December 1986).

On April 22, 1986 the SED Central Committee hosted the foreign delegates at a reception at the House of the Central Committee. Honecker and Gorbachev held toasts at the reception.

== Foreign delegations at the 11th SED party congress ==
List of foreign delegations at the 11th SED party congress
Country	Party	Head of Delegation	Other delegation members
Afghanistan	People's Democratic Party of Afghanistan (PDPA)	Nur Ahmed Nur, Politburo member, secretary of the Central Committee and Deputy Chairman of the Revolutionary Council of the Democratic Republic of Afghanistan	Ghous Sameuddin, Instructor of the International Relations Department of the Central Committee; Abdul Wahed Baba Jan, Ambassador of the Democratic Republic of Afghanistan to the German Democratic Republic
Algeria	Party of the National Liberation Front (FLN)	Salah Goudjil, Member of the Permanent Secretariat of the Central Committee	Youcef Kraiba, Ambassador of Algeria to the German Democratic Republic; Amir Benelmedjat, official of the International Relations Department of the Permanent Secretariat of the Central Committee.
Angola	Popular Movement for the Liberation of Angola – Party of Labour (MPLA-PT)	Juilão Mateus Paulo "Dino Matross", Politburo member, Central Committee Secretary for State and Judicial Organs	Agostinho André Mendes de Carvalho, candidate member of the Central Committee and Ambassador of Angola to the German Democratic Republic; Antonio Maria dos Santos Dias, Head of European Sector of the International Relations Department of the Central Committee.
Argentina	Communist Party of Argentina (PCA)	Athos Fava, General Secretary	Salvador Páez, member of the Political Commission, and secretary of the Western Regional Party Organization of the Buenos Aires Province.
Austria	Communist Party of Austria (KPÖ)	Erwin Scharf, Politburo member	Christine Howorka, member of the leadership of the Vienna party branch
Australia	Socialist Party of Australia (SPA)	Jack McPhillips, President	Dr. Hannah Middleton, Secretariat member.
Bahrain	National Liberation Front - Bahrain (NLF-B)	Ali Naji Abdallah, Leading Committee Member	Abdulhadi Khalaf, Candidate Member of the Leading Committee.
Bangladesh	Communist Party of Bangladesh (CPB)	Ajoy Roy, Secretary of the Central Committee	
Belgium	Communist Party of Belgium (KPB/PCB)	Albert De Coninck, member of Central Committee	
Belgium	Socialist Party (PS)	Marcel Lejoly, Executive Bureau member, Minister for German Community Affairs	
Belgium	Socialist Party (SP)	Jos Wijninckx, Executive Bureau member, chairman of Senate fraction	Jan Leclercq, Member of Parliament
Benin	People's Revolutionary Party of Benin (PRPB)	C.F. Azodogbehou, member of Central Committee, First Deputy Chairman of the National Development Commission of the Central Committee	P. Sedegan, Permanent Secretary of the Organization Department of the Central Committee
Bolivia	Communist Party of Bolivia (PCB)	Humberto Ramírez, member of the Political Commission and secretary of the Central Committee	
Brazil	Brazilian Communist Party (PCB)	Salomão Malina, member of the Executive Committee and secretary of the Central Committee	
Bulgaria	Bulgarian Communist Party (BKP)	Milko Balev, Politburo member and secretary of the Central Committee	Dimitar Dimitrov, Central Committee member and First Secretary of the Tolbukhin District Committee; Valcho Naydenov, Ambassador of Bulgaria to the German Democratic Republic
Burundi	Union for National Progress (UPRONA)	Pasteur Nzinahora, vice chairman of the Political Commission of the Central Committee	Ildephonse Nkeramihigo, national secretary
Canada	Communist Party of Canada (CPC)	Gordon Massie, member of the Central Executive Committee and the Secretariat of the Central Committee	Paula Fletcher, Central Committee member, secretary of the party branch in Manitoba
Cape Verde	African Party for the Independence of Cape Verde (PAICV)	Olivio Pires, Politburo member and secretary of the Central Committee	Jorge Lopes, Head of the International Relations Department of the Central Committee
Chile	Communist Party of Chile (PCCh)	Américo Zorrilla, Member of the Political Commission and the Secretariat of the Central Committee	
Chile	Radical Party (PR)	Hugo Miranda	
Chile	Revolutionary Left Movement (MIR)		
Chile	Socialist Party (PS)	Clodomiro Almeyda, General Secretary	Hernán del Canto, Central Committee member and secretary for International Relations
Colombia	Colombian Communist Party (PCC)	Jesús Villegas, Central Executive Committee member and secretary of the Central Committee	Bernardo Jaramillo Ossa, Central Committee member
Congo	Congolese Party of Labour (PCT)	Jean Ganga-Zandzou, Politburo member, Speaker of the National Assembly	Norbert Ngouna, Central Committee member; Justin Ballay Mégot, Ambassador of the People's Republic of the Congo to the German Democratic Republic
Costa Rica	Costa Rican People's Party (PPC)	Manuel Mora Salas, member of the Political Commission and the Secretariat of the Central Committee	José Merino del Río, member of the Political Commission
Costa Rica	Popular Vanguard Party (PVP)	Humberto Vargas Carbonell, General Secretary	Francisco Gamboa Guzmán, member of the Political Commission
Cuba	Communist Party of Cuba (PCC)	José Ramón Machado Ventura, Politburo member and member of the Secretariat of the Central Committee	Miguel Rodríguez Díaz, Central Committee candidate member and Second Secretary of the District Executive of Isla de la Juventud; Ramiro del Río Pérez-Terán, Ambassador of Cuba to the German Democratic Republic; Oscar Martinez Cordovés, official of the International Relations Department of the Central Committee
Cyprus	Progressive Party of Working People (AKEL)	Michalis Poumpouris, Secretariat member, Politburo member and secretary of the Famagusta District Organization of the party	Michalis Olympios, Central Committee member and Deputy Head of the International Department of the party
Czechoslovakia	Communist Party of Czechoslovakia (KSČ)	Vasil Biľak, Presidium member and secretary of the Central Committee	Václav Šípek, Central Committee member and secretary of the Party District Executive for Northern Bohemia; Pavel Sadovsky, Ambassador of Czechoslovakia to the German Democratic Republic
Denmark	Communist Party of Denmark (DKP)	Jørgen Jensen, Chairman	Harry Osborn, Central Committee member
Dominican Republic	Dominican Communist Party (PCD)	Carlos Ascuasiati, Politburo member	Julio Baez, Central Committee member
Ecuador	Communist Party of Ecuador (PCE)	Milton Jijón Saavedra, Member of the Executive Committee and secretary of the Central Committee	
Egypt	Egyptian Communist Party		
Egypt	National Progressive Unionist Party (Tagammu)	Khaled Mohieddin, General Secretary	Mohamed Refaat El-Saeed, secretary of the Central Committee.
El Salvador	National Liberation Front Farabundo Martí (FMLN)	Schafik Handal, member of High Command of FMLN, General Secretary of the Communist Party of El Salvador	Julio Rodríguez; Jesús Vaquerano; Rodrigo Jiménez
Ethiopia	Workers' Party of Ethiopia (WPE)	Mengistu Haile Mariam, General Secretary, Chairman of the Provisional Military Administrative Council and Commander-in-Chief of the Revolutionary Armed Forces	Addis Tedla, Politburo member and Deputy Chairman of the National Committee for Central Planning; Dr. Ashagre Yigletu, Secretary of the Central Committee and Head of the International Relations Department of the Central Committee; Mengistu Gemetchu, Central Committee member and Head of the Office of the General Secretary; Girma Beshah, candidate member of the Central Committee and Deputy Head of its International Relations Department; Berhanu Jembere, Ambassador of Ethiopia to the German Democratic Republic
Finland	Communist Party of Finland (SKP)	Timo Laaksonen, Politburo member, Member of Parliament	Ossian Sjöman
France	French Communist Party (PCF)	Maxime Gremetz, Politburo member and secretary of the Central Committee	Raymond Jeanne, Central Committee member; Lin Guillou, Central Committee member
France	Socialist Party (PS)	Jacques Huntzinger, member of the Executive Bureau and the Leading Committee	Jean-Christophe Romer, In-charge of the Section for Socialist Countries in the International Secretariat
Ghana	Provisional National Defense Council (PNDC)	Kojo Tsikata, Member of the Provisional National Defense Council	Kofi Djin, PNDC Secretary for Trade; Kwame Sanaa-Poku Jantuah, Ambassador of Ghana to the German Democratic Republic
Great Britain	Communist Party of Great Britain (CPGB)	Peter Carter, member of the Political Committee of the Executive Committee	Heather Malley, Executive Committee member
Great Britain	Labour Party	George Robertson, Deputy Spokesperson on Foreign Affairs	
Grenada	Maurice Bishop Patriotic Movement (MBPM)	George Louison, Executive Committee member	
Greece	Communist Party of Greece (KKE)	Nikos Kaloudis, Politburo member	Yannis Chotos, member of the Central Committee and the Thessaly District Leadership; Betty Ambatielos, official of the International Relations Department of the Central Committee
Greece	Panhellenic Socialist Movement (PASOK)	Dimitris Sotirlis, member of the Executive Bureau of the Central Committee	Rania Balafouta, Secretary for Central and Eastern Europe of the International Relations Area of the Central Committee; Apostolos Gerontas, official of the International Relations Area of the Central Committee
Guadeloupe	Guadeloupe Communist Party (PCG)	Guy Daninthe, General Secretary	Michel Bancou
Guatemala	Guatemalan National Revolutionary Unity (URNG)		
Guatemala	Guatemalan Party of Labour (PGT)	Samuel Ramírez, Member of the Political Commission of the Central Committee	Antonio García, candidate member of the Political Commission of the Central Committee
Guinea-Bissau	African Party for the Independence of Guinea and Cape Verde (PAIGC)	Carmen Pereira, Politburo member, Speaker of the National Assembly	Quinto Cabi Naiana, Central Committee member
Guyana	People's National Congress	Ranji Chandisingh, Deputy Chairman and General Secretary	Patrick Denny, head of the International Relations Department of the Central Administrative Committee.
Guyana	People's Progressive Party	Clement Rohee, member of the Central Executive Committee, head of the International Relations Department	Michael Chan, member of the Central Executive Committee.
Haiti	Unified Party of Haitian Communists (PUCH)	Max Bourjolly, Secretary of the Central Committee	
Honduras	Communist Party of Honduras (PCH)	Rigoberto Padilla Rush, General Secretary	
Hungary	Socialist Workers Party of Hungary (MSZMP)	György Aczél, Politburo member and Director of the Institute of Social Sciences of the Central Committee	Róbert Burgert, Central Committee member and General Director of the Bábolna Agricultural Combine; István Roska, Ambassador of Hungary to the German Democratic Republic.
India	Communist Party of India (CPI)	N. Rajasekhara Reddy, Central Secretariat member	Lokanath Choudhary, National Council member
India	Communist Party of India (Marxist) (CPI(M))	E.M.S. Namboodiripad, General Secretary	Sitaram Yechuri, Central Committee member
India	Indian National Congress (INC)	Mahendra Singh, All India Congress Committee member, Member of Parliament (Lok Sabha)	
Indonesia	Communist Party of Indonesia (PKI)		
Iraq	Arab Socialist Ba'ath Party	Samir Mohammed Abdul Wahab, member of the Regional Command	Malik Bashur, Member of the External Relations Bureau of the Regional Command; Mohammad Qasim Saleh, Ministry of Foreign Affairs official
Iraq	Iraqi Communist Party	Aziz Mohammed, First Secretary of the Central Committee	Dr. Naziha al-Dulaimi, member of the party leadership
Iran	Tudeh Party of Iran	Ali Khavari, First Secretary of the Central Committee	
Ireland	Communist Party of Ireland (CPI)	James Stewart, General Secretary	Jean Roche, Deputy Editor of Unity
Israel	Communist Party of Israel (Maki)	Meir Vilner, General Secretary	Ibrahim Malik, Central Committee member
Italy	Italian Communist Party (PCI)	Adalberto Minucci, Member of the Secretariat and the National Leadership, Head of Culture and Education Section of the Central Committee	Renato Pollini, Central Committee member, Head of the Administrative Department of the Central Committee; Raffaello De Brasi, official of the International Department of the Central Committee
Italy	Italian Socialist Party (PSI)	Arduino Agnelli, Member of Parliament	
Jamaica	Workers Party of Jamaica (WPJ)	Elean Thomas, Politburo member and WPJ representative at the magazine Problems of Peace and Socialism	
Japan	Japanese Communist Party	Saburo Uno, member of the Permanent Presidium of the Central Committee, Director of the Institute for Social Sciences of the Japanese Communist Party	Koichi Ohara, Deputy Head of the International Relations Department; Ryochi Kojima, official of the International Relations Department
Japan	Socialist Party of Japan	Masahiro Yamamoto, Deputy Chairman	Kumao Terada, Chairman of the Legal Committee of the Socialist Party of Japan, Member of the House of Councillors
Jordan	Jordanian Communist Party	Abdul Aziz al-Otteh, Politburo member	Salam Khaled, representative of the Jordanian Communist Party to the magazine Problems of Peace and Socialism
Kampuchea	People's Revolutionary Party of Kampuchea (PRPK)	Men Sam Am, Politburo member, chair of Organizational Commission	Phi Thach, Ambassador of the People's Republic of Kampuchea to the German Democratic Republic; Voeuk Pheng, Department Head of the International Relations Commission of the Central Committee
Laos	Lao People's Revolutionary Party	Phoumi Vongvichit, Politburo member, Deputy Chairman of the Council of Ministers	Vanheuang Vongvichit, Ambassador of the Lao People's Democratic Republic to the German Democratic Republic; Dr. Khamphay Rasmy, Department Head
Lebanon	Lebanese Communist Party	Karim Mroue, Politburo member	Youssuf Murtada, Central Committee member
Lebanon	Progressive Socialist Party	Tareq Chehab, Politburo member and Head of the International Relations Bureau	Ghazi Mansour, Deputy Head of the International Relations Bureau
Luxembourg	Communist Party of Luxembourg (KPL)	René Urbany, chairman	Jacqueline Urbany, Central Committee member
Madagascar	Party of the Independence Congress of Madagascar (AKFM)	Richard Andriamanjato, chairman	Paul Andrianolijao, Deputy General Secretary
Madagascar	Vanguard of the Malagasy Revolution (AREMA)	Ignace Rakoto, Politburo member and Minister of Higher Education	André Razafindrakoto, Planning Director at the Ministry of Higher Education
Mali	Democratic Union of the Malian People (UDPM)	Boubacar Diallo, Central Executive Bureau member	El-Hadj Oumar Sow, Member of Parliament
Malta	Communist Party of Malta (PKM)	Anthony Vassallo, General Secretary	Franz Carvana, Deputy Chairman
Malta	Malta Labour Party	Leo Brincat, International Secretary, Member of Parliament	
Martinique	Martinican Communist Party	André Constant, Politburo member and secretary of the Central Committee	
Mexico	Mexican Unified Socialist Party (PSUM)	Sabino Hernández, member of the Political Commission and secretary of the Central Committee	Jorge Alcocer Villanueva, member of the Political Commission and secretary of the Central Committee
Mongolia	Mongolian People's Revolutionary Party	Bugyn Deshid, Politburo member and chairman of the Party Control Committee	Nyamyn Mishigdorj, Central Committee candidate member, Central Committee Department Head; Ragtschaabasaryn Shamz, Ambassador of Mongolia to the German Democratic Republic
Morocco	Party of Progress and Socialism (PPS)	Abdallah Layachi, Politburo member	Ibrahim Ferhat, Central Committee member
Mozambique	FRELIMO	Mariano de Araújo Matsinhe, Politburo member	Angelo Chichava, member of the Central Committee and Party Control Commission; Fernanda Matsinhe
({{{1}}}) Namibia	South-West Africa People's Organisation (SWAPO)	Hifikepunye Pohamba, Politburo member and secretary of the Central Committee	Magnaem Amupolo (Hautiko), member of the SWAPO Women's Council
Netherlands	Communist Party of the Netherlands (CPN)	Ton van Hoek, Politburo member	Herman Meijer, Central Committee member
Netherlands	Labour Party (PvdA)	Paul Scheffer	Research Associate at the Party Institute for International Affairs
New Zealand	Socialist Unity Party of New Zealand (SUP)	George Jackson, General Secretary	
Nicaragua	Sandinista National Liberation Front (FSLN)	Henry Ruiz, National Leadership, Minister of International Cooperation	William Ramírez Solórzano, Member of the Sandinista Assembly and Minister of Transportation; Juan José Ubeda Herrera, Member of the Sandinista Assembly and Delegate of the Ministry of the Interior in the 6th Region; Fanor Herrera, International Relations Department official
North Korea	Workers' Party of Korea (WPK)	Ri Jong-ok, Politburo member, Vice President of the Democratic People's Republic of Korea	Kwon Min Jun, Deputy Head of the International Relations Department of the Central Committee; Park Jong-chan, Ambassador of the Democratic People's Republic of Korea to the German Democratic Republic
Norway	Communist Party of Norway (NKP)	Ingrid Negård, Deputy Chairwoman	Signe Ödegaard, Central Committee member
Palestine	Palestinian Communist Party	Suleiman Al Najjab, Politburo member	Dr. Maher Charif, Member of the Central Committee of the PLO
Palestine	Palestine Liberation Organization (PLO)	Yasser Arafat, Chairman of the Executive Committee and Commander-in-Chief of the Armed Forces of the Palestinian Revolution	Abdel-Rahim Ahmed, Executive Committee member; Hayel Abdul Hamid, member of the Central Committee of Fatah; Ahmed Abu Ala, Chairman of the PLO Economic Organization SAMED and President of the PLO-GDR Friendship Society; Fahd Suleiman, Member of the Political Bureau of the Democratic Front for the Liberation of Palestine; Ahmed Nadjim, Member of the Political Bureau of the Palestinian Liberation Front; Dr. Isam Kamel Salem, Ambassador of the PLO to the German Democratic Republic
Pakistan	Communist Party of Pakistan		
Panama	People's Party of Panama (PPP)	Ruben Darío Souza, General Secretary	
Paraguay	Paraguayan Communist Party (PCP)	Ananías Maidana, Second Secretary of the Central Committee	
Peru	Peruvian Communist Party (PCP)	Jorge del Prado, General Secretary	Asunción Caballero Méndez, member of the Political Commission and secretary of the Central Committee
Peru	Revolutionary Socialist Party (PSR)	Leonidas Rodríguez Figueroa, Chairman	Enrique Bernales Ballesteros, General Secretary
Philippines	Communist Party of the Philippines (PKP-1930)	Alejandro Briones, Politburo member and secretary of the Central Committee	
Poland	Polish United Workers' Party (PZPR)	Józef Czyrek, Poliburo member and secretary of the Central Committee	Zofia Grzyb, Politburo member; Bogumił Ferensztajn, Central Committee candidate member and First Secretary of the Katowice Provincial Committee of the party; Janusz Obodowski, Ambassador of Poland to the German Democratic Republic
Portugal	Portuguese Communist Party (PCP)	Joaquim Gomes, member of Political Commission of the Central Committee	Manuel Sobral Antunes Pereira, Central Committee member
Romania	Romanian Communist Party (PCR)	Gheorge Oprea, Political Executive Committee member, Deputy Prime Minister	Ion Bogdan Băluță, Central Committee member and First Secretary of the Bacău County Executive of the party; Gheorghe Caranfil, Ambassador of Romania to the German Democratic Republic
San Marino	Sammarinese Communist Party (PCS)	Gastone Pasolini, National Leadership, Minister of Communications and Relations with Local Administrations	
São Tomé and Príncipe	Movement for the Liberation of São Tomé and Príncipe (MLSTP)	Óscar Aguiar do Sacraménto e Sousa, Politburo member, Minister of Agriculture	Carlos de Castro, Head of Bilateral Cooperation Department at the Ministry of Foreign Affairs
Saudi Arabia	Communist Party in Saudi Arabia		
Senegal	Party of Independence and Labour (PIT)	Amath Dansokho, General Secretary	Sémou Pathé Guèye, Politburo member and secretary of the Central Committee
Seychelles	Seychelles People's Progressive Front (SPPF)	Jérémie Bonnelame, Central Executive Committee member, Secretary of State at the Ministry for Popular Education and Information	
Sierra Leone	All People's Congress (APC)	Bockarie Stevens, member of the Leading Council	Josephus Williams, Central Committee candidate member and Youth League organization secretary
({{{1}}}) South Africa	African National Congress (ANC)	Alfred Nzo, General Secretary	Jane Dlamini, member of the Political Commission and the Politico-Military Council
({{{1}}}) South Africa	South African Communist Party (SACP)	Joe Slovo, National Chairman	Dan Tloome, Politburo member
South Yemen	Yemeni Socialist Party	Ali Salem al-Beidh, General Secretary	Mohammed Said Abdallah Mohsen, Politburo member and secretary of the Central Committee; Salem Mohamed Jubran, Central Committee member and First Secretary of the Hadramut Governorate Party Executive; Abdul Wakil Ismail al-Saroori, Central Committee candidate member and Ambassador of the People's Democratic Republic of Yemen to the German Democratic Republic
Soviet Union	Communist Party of the Soviet Union	Mikhail Gorbachev, General Secretary	Vadim Medvedev, secretary of the Central Committee; Karl Vaino, Central Committee member and First Secretary of the Communist Party of Estonia; Vladimir Tikhomirov, Central Committee member and worker at the Vladimir Ilyich Electromechanical Plant in Moscow; Konstantin Frolov, candidate member of the Central Committee and vice president of the Academy of Sciences of the Soviet Union; Vyacheslav Kochemasov, Central Committee member and Ambassador of the Soviet Union to the German Democratic Republic.
Spain	Communist Party of Spain (PCE)	Francisco Frutos, Executive Committee member, secretary of the Central Committee	Miguel Morán, Central Committee member and member of the International Commission of the Central Committee
Spain	Communist Party of the Peoples of Spain (PCPE)	Ignacio Gallego, General Secretary	José Antonio Moral Santín, Executive Committee member, First Secretary of the Madrid Regional Committee of PCPE
Spain	Spanish Socialist Workers Party (PSOE)	Rafael Estrella Pedrola, Federal Committee Member, Senator	Antonio Callejas, Advisor to the delegation lead
Sri Lanka	Communist Party of Sri Lanka (CPSL)	M.G. Mendis, Politburo member	H.G.S. Ratnaweera, Politburo member
Sudan	Sudanese Communist Party	Suleiman Hamed, Secretariat member	Dr. Muhamed Murad, representative of the party to the magazine Problems of Peace and Socialism
Sweden	Left Party - Communists (VPK)	Bertil Måbrink, Deputy Chairman, chair of parliamentary fraction	Margareta Olofsson, Chairwoman of the Stockholm party organization
Sweden	Social Democratic Labour Party (SAP)	Lars Engqvist	
Sweden	Workers Party - Communists (APK)	Rolf Hagel, Chairman	Tage Häggström, Central Committee member
Switzerland	Swiss Party of Labour (PdA/PST)	Hansjörg Hofer, Politburo member	Jakob Lechleiter, Central Committee member
Switzerland	Social Democratic Party of Switzerland (SPS)	Peter Vollmer, Deputy Chairman	Toya Maissen, member of the Basel Executive
Syria	Arab Socialist Ba'ath Party	Dr. Suleiman Kaddah, Deputy Regional Secretary	Ahmed Kabalan, Regional Command member; Ala al-Dien Abeddien, Damascus district secretary; Abdel Rahman Abdel Rahiem, Head of the Office of the Deputy Regional Secretary; Nabil Jabali, official of the International Relations Department of the National Command
Syria	Syrian Communist Party	Khaled Hammami, Politburo member	Abdul Wahab Rashwani, Central Committee member
Tanzania	Chama Cha Mapinduzi (CCM)	Paul Sozigwa, Central Committee member and National Executive Committee member and Head of the Control and Discipline Department	Isidore L. Shirima, Under-Secretary and Sector Head for Africa in the International Relations Department
Tunisia	Socialist Destour Party (PSD)	Slaheddine Ben Mbarek, Politburo member	Belhassen Chérif, General Secretary of the Coordination Committee of the Party for Tunis City
Tunisia	Tunisian Communist Party (PCT)	Abdelhamid Ben Mustapha, Politburo member and secretary of the Central Committee	
Turkey	Communist Party of Turkey (TKP)	Haydar Kutlu, General Secretary	
Uruguay	Communist Party of Uruguay (PCU)	Alberto Altesor, Executive Committee member and secretary of the Central Committee	Alberto Suarez, Central Committee member
Uruguay	Socialist Party (PS)	Ernesto de los Campos, Executive Committee member and secretary of the Central Committee	Gonzalo Betarte, Central Committee member
United States	Communist Party USA (CPUSA)	James West, Politburo member and chairman of the National Review Commission of the party	
Venezuela	Communist Party of Venezuela (PCV)	Alonso Ojeda Olaechea, General Secretary	Americo Díaz Nuñez, Central Committee member and director of the party newspaper Tribuna Popular
Vietnam	Communist Party of Vietnam (CPV)	Chu Huy Mân, Deputy Chairman of the Politburo and Deputy Chairman of the State Council	Nguyen Van Trong, Deputy Chairman of the International Relations Commission of the Central Committee; Tran Hoai Nam, Ambassador of Vietnam to the German Democratic Republic.
West Berlin	Socialist Unity Party of West Berlin (SEW)	Horst Schmitt, chairman	Inge Kopp, deputy chair; Dietmar Ahrens, deputy chair; Uwe Doering, member of the Executive Bureau
West Germany	German Communist Party (DKP)	Herbert Mies, Chairman	Hermann Gautier, Deputy Chairman; Martha Buschmann, Member of the Presidium of the Party Executive; Beate Landefeld, Member of the Party Executive
West Germany	Social Democratic Party of Germany (SPD)	Dr. Wilhelm Bruns, Chief of International Department of Friedrich Ebert Stiftung	
Yugoslavia	League of Communists of Yugoslavia (SKJ)	Jure Bilić, member of the Presidium of the Central Committee	Hisen Ramadani, Central Committee member; Ljubomir Majerić, Ambassador of Yugoslavia to the German Democratic Republic
Zambia	United National Independence Party (UNIP)	Daniel Muchiwa Lisulo, Central Committee member and Chairman of the Committee on Political and Legal Affairs	Joseph B. Simuyandi, Administrative Secretary of the Central Committee
Zimbabwe	Zimbabwe African National Union-Patriotic Front (ZANU-PF)	Emmerson Mnangagwa, Politburo member and secretary of the Central Committee, Minister of State at the Bureau of Prime Minister	Dr. Naomi Nhiwatiwa, Central Committee member, Administrative Secretary of the ZANU-PF Women's League and Deputy Minister for Information, Post and Telecommunications
	The magazine Problems of Peace and Socialism	Gancho Ganev, member of the editorial board and Central Committee member of the Bulgarian Communist Party	Rafic Samhoun, Politburo member of the Lebanese Communist Party.

There were additional delegations of illegal parties participating, which were not credited in official reports due to security reasons. The General People's Congress of Libya could not attend due to the American military intervention prior to the meeting.

=== Soviet delegation ===
The 11th SED party congress was the first foreign party congress attended by Gorbachev since his election as Soviet party general secretary, and his first visit to East Germany in his new role. It was the first visit of a Soviet top leader to a SED party congress since 1971. According to reporting from the Associated Press West German officials interpreted Gorbachev's participation at the Berlin congress as an 'honor for Honecker', noting that Gorbachev had been absent from recent party congresses in Bulgaria and Czechoslovakia.

At the 27th Congress of the Communist Party of the Soviet Union Gorbachev had launched a shift towards liberal policies of Glasnost and Perestroika. SED leader Erich Honecker had attented the 27th Soviet party congress. The 11th SED congress marked a key event for the Socialist Bloc as a whole, as the Soviet delegation would presented the new policies to the East German party leadership. Prior to departure for Berlin, discussions took place within the Soviet leadership on how to best approach Honecker. In a reply to the Soviet ambassador Vyacheslav Kochemasov in Berlin, Gorbachev and Anatoly Chernyaev argued that they would try to engage Honecker on positive opportunities for joint cooperation in line with the new policies, and not make him feel cornered or pressured to accept instructions from Moscow.

On April 16, 1986 Soviet delegation was received at Berlin Schönefeld Airport by Honecker and other members of the East German government. On April 18, 1986 Gorbachev attended a youth rally together with Honecker, and attended a wreath-laying ceremony at Treptower Park. Gorbachev addressed the congress plenary on April 18, 1986. In his speech he reaffirmed that 'socialism on German soil had made reliable progress', and praised advances of the SED in terms of economy and science. He argued that the recent U.S. attack on Libya showed the 'bankruptcy of U.S. policy' in the Middle East, furthermore criticizing recent U.S. nuclear tests.

On April 19, 1986 Gorbachev visited the Friedrichsfelde cemetery. On April 20, 1986 Gorbachev visited the city of Potsdam, where he visited the National Economic Institute and gave an address at the Cecilienhof palace (site of the 1945 Potsdam Conference). He was the first Soviet leader to visit the site since Stalin in 1945. Gorbachev was accompanied in Potsdam by his wife Raisa Gorbacheva, SED leader Günter Mittag and various Soviet party leaders. Speaking with reporters at the Cecilienhof palace, Gorbachev stated that he would be willing to go ahead with a Soviet-US summit later in the year, if positive steps were taken by the U.S. side.

Gorbachev and Honecker met on April 21, 1986, during which Gorbachev outlined the new party line of the 27th Soviet party congress. In the morning of April 21, 1986 Gorbachev visited the Werkzeugmaschinenkombinat „7. Oktober“ factory plant, where he was received by some 2,000 workers. In a speech to the factory workers Gorbachev proposed the simultaneous abolition of both NATO and the Warsaw Pact, a statement that East German television reproduced the same day. Gorbachev held a meeting with South Yemeni delegation leader Ali Salem al-Beidh on the same day. On April 22, 1986 Gorbachev met with the Israeli delegation leader Meir Vilner.

The Soviet delegation departed Berlin Schönefeld Airport on the morning of April 22, 1986. Honecker accompanied Gorbachev at the airport. Upon returning to Moscow, the Gorbachev-led delegation returning from Berlin was received by Heydar Aliyev, Aleksandra Biryukova, Viktor Chebrikov, Pyotr Demichev, Anatoly Dobrynin, Vladimir Dolgikh, Andrei Gromyko, Yegor Ligachev, Viktor Nikonov, Georgy Razumovsky, Nikolai Ryzhkov, Eduard Shevardnadze, Sergei Sokolov, Mikhail Solomentsev, Nikolai Talyzin, Vitaly Vorotnikov, Alexander Yakovlev, Boris Yeltsin, Lev Zaykov and Mikhail Zimyanin.

=== Czechoslovak delegation ===
The delegation of the Communist Party of Czechoslovakia to the 11th SED party congress was led by Vasil Biľak, party presidium member and secretary of the Central Committee. He was accompanied by Václav Šípek, Central Committee member and secretary of the Party District Executive for Northern Bohemia, and Pavel Sadovsky, Ambassador of Czechoslovakia to the German Democratic Republic. The Czechoslovak delegation paid a visit to Freiberg.

The Czechoslovak delegation returned home on April 21, 1986. Biľak was accompanied at Berlin airport by ambassador Sadovsky and SED Central Committee member Egon Krenz. Upon arriving at Ruzyně airport, the delegation was received by party presidium secretariat member Miloš Jakeš, deputy chairman of the Central Committee Radoslav Klein and the chargé d'affaires of the GDR embassy to Czechoslovakia Karl-Heinz Heisig.

=== Ethiopian delegation ===
Mengistu Haile Mariam, the chair of the ruling Provisional Military Administrative Council of Ethiopia and the head of the Workers' Party of Ethiopia, visited the German Democratic Republic between April 12 and 23, 1986. Mengistu's visit was widely reported in the press. During his stay in East Germany, Mengistu visited the Central Institute for Socialist Economic Management, the Reparaturwerk Neubrandenburg (where he was received by a workers rally organized in his honour) and toured the Central Institute for Socialist Economic Management.

In Berlin, Mengistu held meetings with Honecker and Gorbachev. The meeting with Gorbachev followed a meeting between the two at the Soviet party congress around a month earlier. Discussions centered upon Soviet-Ethiopian disagreements over South Yemen (with Ethiopia hosting ousted South Yemeni president Ali Nasir Muhammad). Honecker accompanied Mengistu to the airport upon latter's departure.

=== Palestinian delegation ===
As of early 1986 the position of the Palestine Liberation Organization (PLO) chairman Yasser Arafat had been significantly weakened and he was facing internal dissent, as he had invested much of his remaining political capital in negotiations with Jordan and the United States. Having failed to secure U.S. support for Palestinian right to self-determination, Arafat moved closer to the Soviet Union. Ahead of the 27th Soviet party congress Khalil al-Wazir tried to secure an invitation for Arafat to attend, but the Soviets insisted instead of a 5-member PLO delegation led Faruq al-Qaddumi with two delegates from the Palestinian National Salvation Front and two delegates from the Democratic Alliance (DFLP-Palestinian Communist Party). The Soviet leadership was not ready to host or meet Arafat before the latter would have secured a reconciliation process of Palestinian factions. On April 8, 1986 Algerian president Chadli Bendjedid announced that a Palestinian National Council would be held at which factions would be reconciled.

Following the announcement of the Algerian initiative, Gorbachev agreed to meet with Arafat at the sidelines of the SED congress in Berlin. The meeting took place on April 18, 1986. The meeting lasted about one hour. It was Arafat's first meeting with a Soviet leader since the death of Yuri Andropov two years earlier. PLO radio attached great importance to the meeting, whilst the reporting in the Soviet press was much more muted.

According to the Lebanese newspaper As-Safir the meeting dealt with reconciliation between Arafat and his rivals (such as Colonel Abu Musa and the PFLP). Reportedly at the Berlin meeting Gorbachev had agreed to help reach out to the Syrian government to discuss reconciliation with Arafat, but remained supportive of preconditions set by the other Palestinian factions for PLO (such as annulling the 1985 Amman Accord and the resolutions of the 1984 17th Palestinian National Council). Following the meeting with Gorbachev, Arafat left for Baghdad.

=== Polish delegation ===
The head of the delegation of the Polish United Workers' Party (PZPR), Józef Czyrek, addressed the congress plenary on April 18, 1986. On April 20, 1986 the Polish delegation visited enterprises and institutions in Frankfurt (Oder). On April 22, 1986 First Secretary of the Central Committee of the PZPR and Chairman of the State Council Wojciech Jaruzelski, who was himself not present in Berlin for the congress, sent a congratulatory message to Honecker upon the latter's re-election as SED general secretary.
