= 1961 Republic of the Congo presidential election =

Presidential elections were held in the Republic of the Congo for the first time on 26 March 1961. The only candidate was the incumbent president Fulbert Youlou of the Democratic Union for the Defense of African Interests, who was re-elected unopposed. Voter turnout was 90.3%.

== Results ==
Candidate	Party	Votes	%
Fulbert Youlou	Democratic Union for the Defense of African Interests	405,589	100.00
Total		405,589	100.00
Valid votes		405,589	97.53
Invalid/blank votes		10,254	2.47
Total votes		415,843	100.00
Registered voters/turnout		460,270	90.35
Source: Nohlen et al.
