= Itoua =

Itoua is a Congolese surname that may refer to:

- Béranger Itoua (born 1992), Congolese footballer
- Bernard Onanga Itoua (born 1988), French footballer of Congolese descent
- Bruno Itoua (born 1956), Congolese politician
- Hervé Itoua (born 1942), bishop of the Roman Catholic Diocese of Ouesso
- Rock Itoua-Ndinga (born 1983), Congolese footballer
- Teddy Okobo Itoua (born 1979), Republic of the Congo basketball player
