= List of Republic of the Congo artists =

This is a list of notable artists from, or associated with, Republic of Congo.

== K ==
- Bill Kouélany (born 1965)

== M ==
- Rhode Bath-Schéba Makoumbou (born 1976)
