= Kaiman =

Kaiman may refer to:

- Kaiman, lead ship of the Kaiman-class torpedo boats
- Kaiman, lead ship of the Kaiman-class submarines
- Moisés Kaiman (1913–2012), Polish-born Mexican rabbi
- Jonathan Kaiman American journalist

== See also ==
- Caiman (disambiguation)
