= Fulbert Youlou =

1st President of Congo-Brazzaville from 1960 to 1963

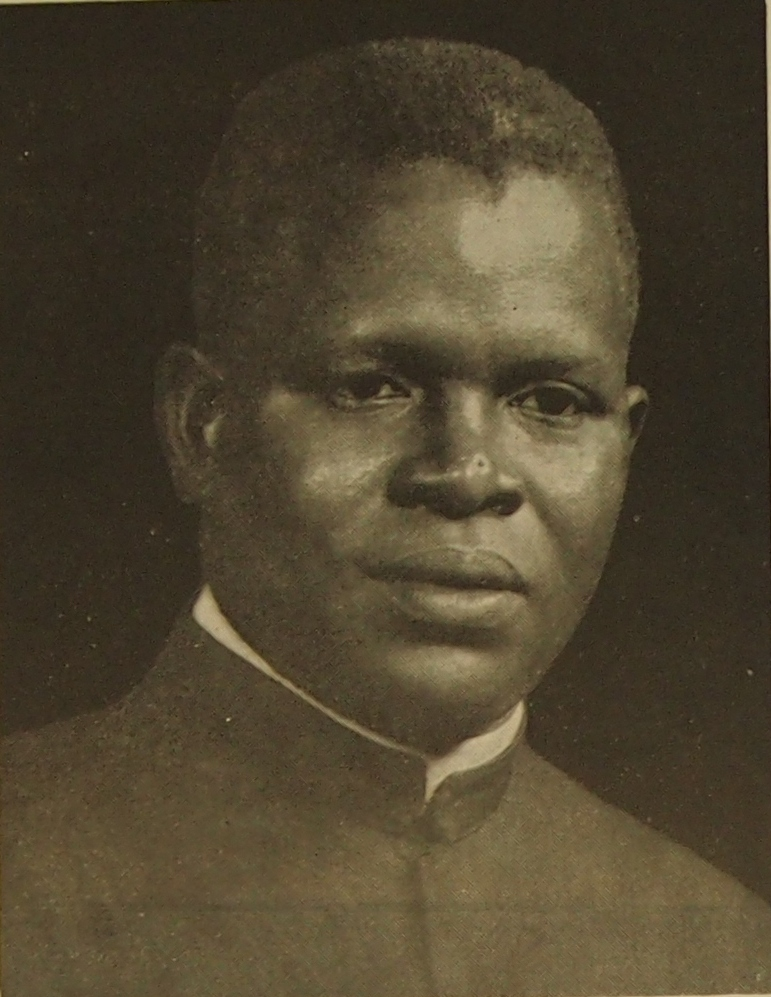
- Fulbert Youlou in 1959

1st President of the Republic of the Congo
- In office 15 August 1960 – 15 August 1963
- Vice President: Stéphane Tchichelle; Jacques Opangault
- Preceded by: None
- Succeeded by: Alphonse Massemba-Débat

2nd Prime Minister of the Republic of the Congo
- In office 8 December 1958 – 21 November 1959
- Preceded by: Jacques Opangault
- Succeeded by: Post abolished, 1959–1963; Alphonse Massemba-Débat

Personal details
- Born: 19 July 1917 Madibou, Moyen-Congo
- Died: 6 May 1972 (aged 54) Madrid, Spanish State
- Party: Democratic Union for the Defence of African Interests

Fulbert Youlou (19 July 1917 – 6 May 1972) was a Congolese nationalist leader and former Catholic priest who became the first President of the Republic of the Congo upon its independence in 1960.

In August 1960, Youlou led his country into independence. In December 1960, he organised an intercontinental conference in Brazzaville, wherein he praised the advantages of economic liberalism and condemned communism. Youlou disappointed many when he imposed a single-party system and imprisoned union leaders in August 1963; this led to the revolution of the Trois Glorieuses (English: "Three Glorious Days"). Charles de Gaulle despised Youlou and France refused to assist him. Youlou resigned thereafter in the face of overwhelming opposition to his governance.

== Youth and ordination ==
Youlou's home region of Pool.

Youlou, whose last name means "Grape" in Lari, was born in Madibou. His birth date has been indicated as 29 June, 17 June or 19 July 1917. A younger child in a family of three boys, he was a Lari of the Kongo. At nine years old, he was baptised and received the Christian name Fulbert. In 1929 he entered the Petit Séminaire of Brazzaville. A bright student, he was sent to Akono in Cameroon to complete his secondary studies. After this, he entered the Grand Séminaire of Yaoundé where he did very well in philosophy. Here he met Barthélemy Boganda, the future nationalist leader of Oubangui-Chari and the first prime minister of the Central African Republic autonomous territory, but also Andre-Marie Mbida, Cameroon's first head of state.

Returning to the country, he taught at the Seminary in Mbamou before travelling to Libreville to complete his theological studies. He completed his final cycle of studies in Brazzaville. Youlou was ordained as a priest on 9 June 1946 or in 1949. He was assigned to the parish of Saint-François de Brazzaville where he directed several youth organisations, sporting activities, and Catholic groups. He also covered the general hospital and the prison.

== Political rise ==
=== A political priest ===
Fulbert Youlou was very interested in politics. Encouraged by his protector, Father Charles Lecomte, he offered his candidature for the African college in the territorial elections of 1947 in the district of Pool. But although Father Lecomte was elected without difficulty to the European college, Youlou suffered a bitter defeat. He realised that if he were elected, he would no longer appear so clearly supported by the administration or the missions. Although a man of the white church, thereafter he gave himself over to the African resistance.

This attitude did not please his superiors, and moreover in October 1953 a complaint was made to the diocese against the young Abbé, caught in the act of adultery. As a disciplinary measure, he was reassigned on 20 November 1954 to a mission in the forest at Mindouli where he was employed as the headmaster of a Catholic school.

During his time at Saint-François, Youlou made an impression as a Lari orator. Many Lari were followers of Matswanism, a messianic movement challenging colonialism which was founded by a Téké [André Matswa or Mutswé], who died in prison in 1942. The young Abbé managed to position himself as an interlocutor for the Matswa, taking control of Amicale, the Lari self-help organization Matswa had founded, allowing him to exercise influence on his disciples. In addition, his focus on the association enabled him to attach himself to the Lari youth. Finally, his punishment by the church confirmed him in his role as their leader because it made him appear the victim of the European-dominated Congoloese church.

=== Between politician and mystic ===
In October 1955, thanks to this revolutionary image, a Kongo council (not limited to Lari people) chose Youlou as their representative for the upcoming legislative elections. When his candidature was announced, his bishop Mgr. Bernard attempted to dissuade him. He was banned from wearing the cassock and from celebrating the Mass. The Kongos supplied a monthly pension for him and even a car with a driver to meet his needs.

Initially, Youlou's supporters considered him the reincarnation of "Jesus-Matswa," an idea encouraged by the fact that he was a priest. He himself became a living symbol of colonial resistance. A story attached him to the Loufoulakari falls, where the great Kongo Boueta Mbongo was decapitated and thrown into the water by the colonisers. He took to bathing there in his cassock, praying and calling upon the powerful ancestors. Allegedly his clothes remained dry even when he was immersed.

This mysticism was carried over into the electoral campaign. Acts of violence became the method of political action for the Bacongo militants which he oversaw. Thus on 12 December 1955, tracts by his supporters called for the Matswanists who had not joined Abbé to be "whipped". One of them, Victor Tamba-Tamba, saw his house burnt down and his entire family killed on 28 December. The agitation reached fever pitch on 10 October 1956, the day of the election: when the polls of Bacongo were opened, Lari youth took it upon themselves to kill voters whom they suspected of not voting for Youlou. The authorities had to send out security forces to protect the polling stations. Calm did not long return to Brazzaville. In the following two days, a number of houses were destroyed, four thousand people were killed and several thousands were wounded. Youlou and one of his opponents, Jacques Opangault, called for calm by radio.

A week later, the results were announced. The incumbent, Jean-Félix Tchicaya was re-elected as deputy for Central Congo with 45,976 votes (29.7% of voters), against 43,193 for Jacques Opangault and 41,084 for Youlou. A collection was taken so that he could travel to Paris to attempt to buy weapons and start a war in the country against the newly elected Tchicaya. This voyage allowed him to make some new contacts.

== Rise to power ==
=== Road to the vice-presidency ===
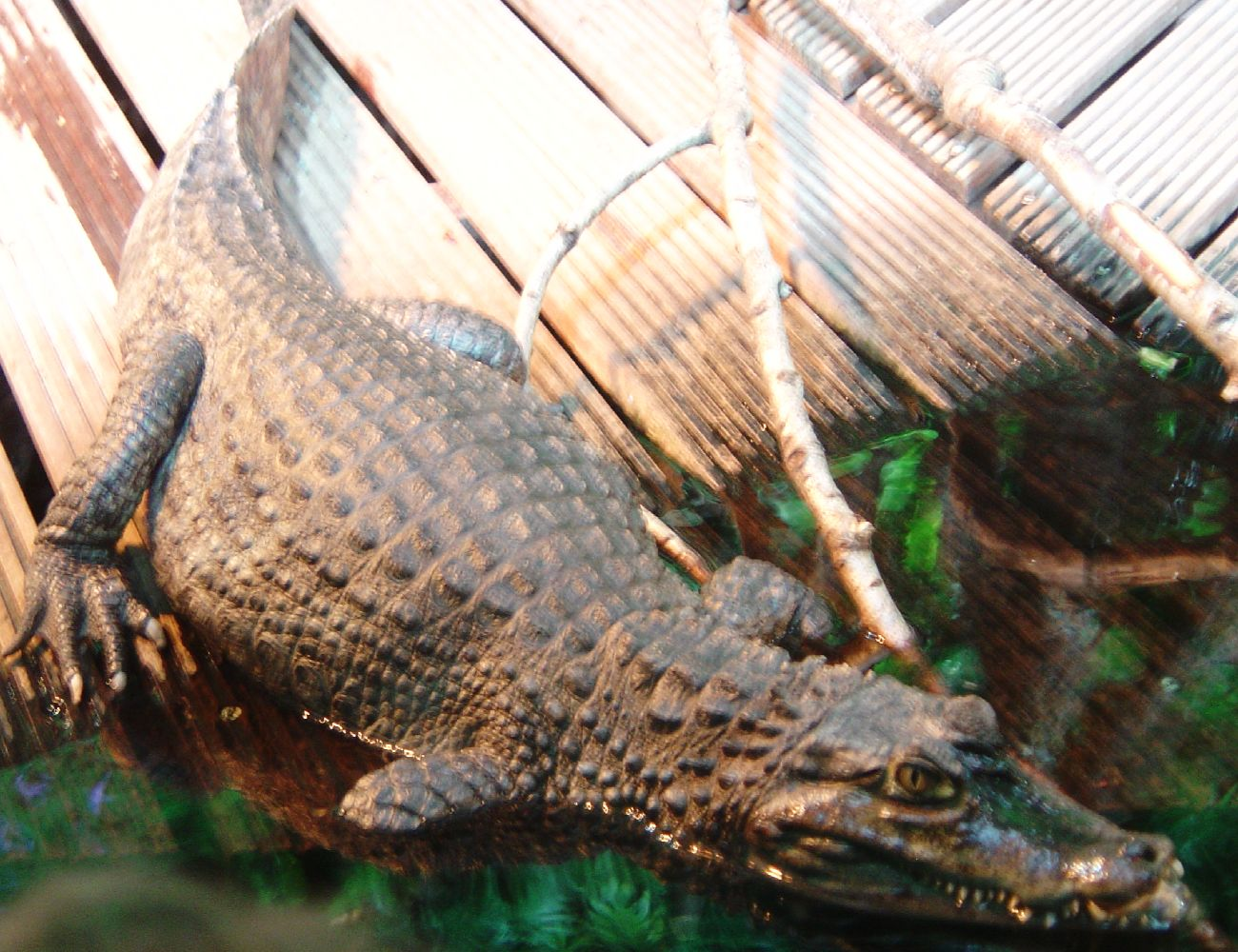
The crocodile, symbol of the UDDIA.

On 17 May 1956, Youlou founded the Union démocratique de défense des intérêts africains (UDDIA), as a competitor to the Congolese Progressive Party (Parti progressiste congolais, PPC) of Tchicaya and of the section of the SFIO transformed in January 1957 into the African Socialist Movement (Mouvement socialiste africain, MSA) directed by Opangault. The symbol of the new party was the crocodile, a ferocious and powerful animal linked to sorcery and crime. An anti-communist party of Liberal Christian persuasion, it contained 46 politicians, 11 of which came from the PPC and 5 from the SFIO. His political base, hitherto limited to the three regions of Pool, Niari and Bouenza, expanded to include Kouliou, with the assistance of the PPC secretary general, Stéphane Tchitchéllé. The party's women's wing, Femmes-Caïmans, was among the most active political organizations in Brazzaville during 1957-1960, managing to recruit illiterate women.

In November 1956, Youlou filed papers declaring his candidacy for the election of the mayor of Brazzaville. However, these papers were in fact supposed to be filed in Pointe-Noire. French colonial officials, aware of Barthélemy Boganda's similar dramatic rise to power in Ubangi-Shari, did not want to take the risk of letting Youlou's request lapse, which could have caused unrest amongst the public, so they informed him of his error. They believed that they could utilize Youlou's influence among the Lari people to their benefit. The municipal elections took place on 18 November 1956 for a single combined European and African council and the UDDIA experienced clear success, taking Brazzaville, Pointe-Noire and Dolisie. Youlou defeated Jacques Opangault who contested the results, and was elected mayor of Brazzaville, the first black elected mayor in French Equatorial Africa, with 23 seats compared to SFIO's 11 and PPC's 3.

Support for Tchicaya's PPC collapsed almost entirely, leaving Opangault and Youlou as the main political contenders in the 31 March 1957 Moyen-Congo Territorial Assembly elections, held to elect a local government, in accordance with the Loi Cadre Defferre which had entered into force in 1956. Despite their earlier successes, the UDDIA's Vice-President Simon Kikounga N'Got quit the movement and founded his own party, the Groupement pour le progrès économique et social du Moyen-Congo (GPES) Simon Kikounga N'Got took the electorate of Niari with him and won over the PPC-MSA coalition. Thus, on 31 March 1957, the UDDIA came second with 25 seats, while the coalition led by Opangault won 42 seats. Following negotiations, a coalition government was eventually formed by the MSA and UDDIA, with five ministerial portfolios assigned to each party. Opangault received the vice-presidency – French colonial governors remained as presidents until 14 July 1958 when these positions were taken by the elected African vice-presidents. Abbé took the ministry of agriculture, intending to take advantage of the numerous tours of the country which the position would require.

=== Manoeuvres and political tensions ===
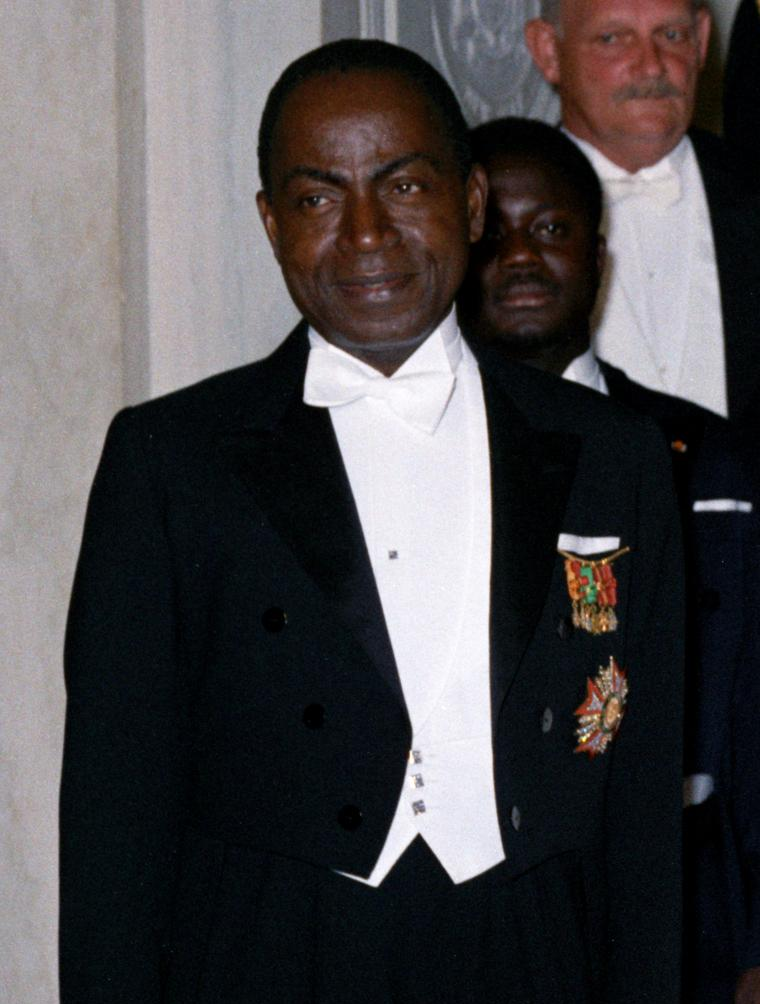
The Ivoirien Félix Houphouët-Boigny

During the territorial elections of March 1957, the leading colonists in the country united in the Union du Moyen-Congo (UMC) had effectively supported Youlou. In September 1957 they helped him to poach a representative of Niari, Georges Yambot, from the ranks of the GPES. The UDDIA thus achieved a majority in the Assembly, with 23 seats, which drove Opangault to the point of starting to kill all Lari he could catch in Poto-Poto. Youlou was appointed to the Vice-Presidency. The MSA expressed its outrage and threatened a general war in the country if he didn't get the dismissal of Yambot. The crisis reached its height when Yambot was abducted on 24 November 1957 in order to force him to resign from his seat in the Assembly. The Governor, Jean Soupault, managed to broach a compromise: Opangault was restored to the Vice-Presidency and the UDDIA retained its new majority in the Assembly.

In January 1958, relations between the two parties worsened again after Youlou decided to organise UDDIA investigatory trips to the GPES fief of Dolisie. Clashes took place there between the socialists and Youlou's supporters, leading to at least two thousands deaths and several injuries. Paris, tired of all these clashes, ordered the two Congolese leaders to control their followers.

In May 1958 Youlou further reinforced his position. On the 5th, the UDDIA's European deputy Christian Jayle was elected to the Presidency of the territorial Assembly. In addition, after the departure of Jean-Félix Tchicaya from the Rassemblement Démocratique Africain (the pan-African party of Félix Houphouët-Boigny) the UDDIA replaced the PPC as its affiliate in the Congo. Youlou's party thus gained the support of Paris and the goodwill of local authorities.

=== Constitutional coup d'etat ===
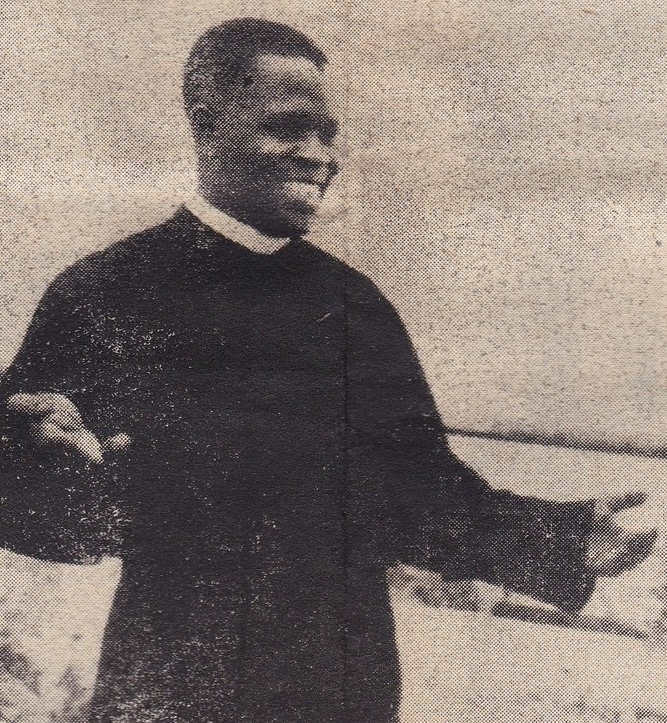
Youlou in 1958

Despite a degree of antipathy towards Charles de Gaulle, Youlou supported the "Yes" vote in the referendum on the French Community on 28 September 1958, along with Tchicaya. This position received 93% of the vote, thereby reinforcing Congo's autonomy.

On 28 November 1958, the Territorial Assembly met in session to grant institutions to the country. The UDDIA and MSA were unable to agree on the shape the constitution should take. The atmosphere was very tense; socialist sympathisers gathered around the government building. The deputies exchanged insults as they arrived. Finally the socialist deputies stormed out of the Assembly in protest, leaving the UDDIA with a majority. Unconcerned, Youlou proclaimed the Republic on his own, passed constitutional laws, and converted the Territorial Assembly into a legislature. By a unanimous vote of the 23 deputies present, Youlou was appointed head of the provisional government. Since Opangault kept calling for war, the political climate in Pointe-Noire became hostile and so Youlou transferred the capital to Brazzaville.

The opposition, headed by Opangault, denounced this action as a constitutional coup d'État and promised to transform Brazzaville into a war zone. The next day, the MSA deputies met alone in the Assembly in Pointe-Noire to declare the actions of Youlou's supporters illegal. This act led to riots: houses were burnt, thousands of people were killed and many more wounded. The French army was forced to intervene.

== Head of the Republic of Congo ==
=== Establishing personal power ===
==== Elimination of parliamentary opposition ====
On 8 December 1958, Youlou became prime minister. His government sought to make itself representative of Congolese society: it included at least one deputy from each region, representatives of traditional elites and two spokesmen for youth and unions. Two European deputies from the MSA, Albert Fourvelle and André Kerherve, also received positions. The government's majority thereby increased from 23 to 25 seats.

Opangault, whose party had only 20 seats, sought to redress the situation in the legislative elections scheduled for March 1959 by the agreement made with Youlou on 26 August 1958. Now that he was prime minister, Youlou refused to hold them. On 16 February 1959, the MSA deputies once again threatened to create chaos in Brazzaville and called for the dissolution of the assembly. When this was again denied, MSA-PPC supporters in Poto-Poto (the quarter of Brazzaville controlled by the Mbochi, who supported Opangault) attacked and started killing those they considered to be supporters of the UDDIA. These clashes rapidly consumed the whole of Brazzaville and transformed into a bloody battle between rival bands of Mbochi and Lari, which went beyond the simple rivalry between the MSA and the UDDIA. The riots officially resulted in a thousand deaths and many more injuries and destroyed homes. Only with the intervention of the French Army on 20 February did the riots come to an end. This fighting marked the beginning of a fierce hostility between the Mbochi and Lari.

Youlou took advantage of these events by arresting Opangault, accusing him of inciting the violence. He was released five months later without ever facing trial, but promising revenge. In the meantime, Youlou ensconced himself in power. On 20 February 1959 he ordered the adoption of a constitution which gave expanded powers to the prime minister, including the power to dissolve the Assembly. In April 1959, the MSA suffered two further defections to the UDDIA, leading Opangault to threaten to kill all Lari he could catch on his way. On 30 April, Youlou finally dissolved parliament, after he had carefully redrawn the electoral districts. On 14 June 1959, the UDDIA won 51 seats in the Assembly, with 58% of the vote. The MSA received only 10 seats.

After these legislative elections, the Assembly became National. It confirmed Youlou in the role of prime minister and then, on 21 November, elected him president of the Republic of Congo. Triumphant over his rivals in parliament, he curbed the inveterate Matswanists who still refused to consider him the reincarnation of Matswa. From June to July 1959, they were hunted down, arrested, and brutally subjugated – one source speaks of 9,000 deaths.

==== Repression, seduction and submission ====
On 16 February 1960, in order to satisfy Congolese public opinion, Youlou decided to sack the European members of the government. These were the minister of finance, Joseph Vidal; the minister of economic affairs, Henri Bru; and the Secretary of State for Information, Christian Jayle. On the other hand, Youlou retained Alfred Delarue, his chief of service for "Documentation". Delarue, a former official in the Prefecture of Police of Paris and a Vichy collaborator, had organised, to Abbé's advantage, the elimination of the Congolese far-left, which had regrouped as the Confédération générale africaine des travailleurs (CGTA) and the Union de la jeunesse congolaise (UJC). On 9 May 1960, on account of a fake "Communist plot", Youlou had the leaders of the CGTA and the UJC, Julien Boukambou and Aimé Matsika, arrested – along with his long-time opponent Simon Kikounga N'Got. The next day, the Assembly passed a number of laws restricting fundamental rights. Henceforth, any organised opposition to the government was illegal, as were publications encouraging such opposition. Furthermore, these laws entitled Youlou to imprison, kill or exile any individual considered dangerous to the stability of the regime.

Despite Youlou's use of coercive measures against his adversaries, he was equally keen to bring them over to his side. On 17 June 1959, after his legislative victory, contested by Opangault, he called for national unity:

Les élections du 14 juin n'ont pas été la victoire d'un parti ou d'un programme dans le sens qu'on lui donne en Europe; elles marquent le début d'une unité nationale, qui ne pourra que se renforcer.
The elections of 14 June were not the victory of one party or policy in the way they are in Europe; they mark the beginning of national unity, which can only grow stronger.

On 3 July, Youlou formed his second government, incorporating opposition politicians. On 15 August 1960, Jacques Opangault was made a minister of state and vice-president of the council, highly symbolic positions. Finally, in January 1961, Simon Kikounga N'Got received the portfolio of Economic Affairs.

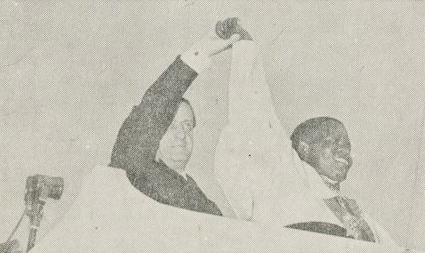
President Youlou holding hands with French Minister of Culture André Malraux to celebrate independence on 15 August

On 15 August 1960, the Republic of Congo became independent. A cult of personality progressively developed around the president, including notably the printing of stamps with his image on them. In the months following independence, a motion of no confidence in his government was proposed in the Assembly. Offended, Youlou came up naked and pulled an AK-47 from his cassock in the middle of the Assembly and forced the impertinent deputies to retract the motion. The affair was not repeated and on 2 March 1961, a new constitution was adopted; it created a strengthened presidential regime and established the independence of the executive and legislative branches: the Assembly could no longer depose the government and the President of the Republic could not dissolve the Assembly.

On 20 March 1961, Youlou was the UDDIA and MSA candidate in the presidential elections. He was re-elected without opposition, with 100% of the votes. This victory marked for him the successful construction of national unity. Henceforth he could devote himself entirely to economic development and social progress.

=== Youlou's economic policy ===
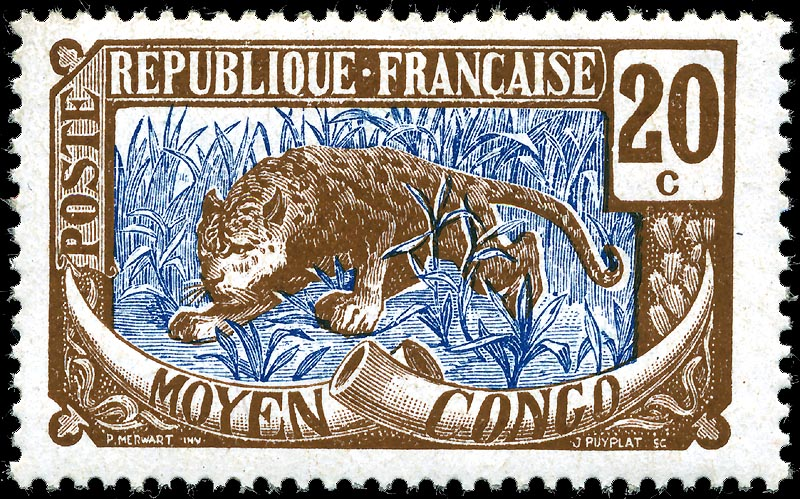
Congolese stamp produced in 1907 by the colonial government.

Congo was one of the most economically profitable French colonies; between 1946 and 1959 a number of infrastructure projects were completed and some light industry established. Thus, at independence, Youlou inherited a relatively healthy economy with 37.4% of GDP produced by the primary sector, 20.9% by industry and 41.7% in the tertiary sector. Furthermore, in 1958 the Congo was home to 30,000 civil servants of varying qualification and more than 80,000 students. This educational policy was strongly encouraged by Youlou who assigned 40% of the 1960 budget to education.

==== Support for economic liberalism ====
The Congolese leader was a fierce supporter of economic liberalism. After he took power, he adopted a moderate policy, striving to attract investment in his country, as shown in a comment made on 8 December 1958:

Nous sommes prêts à formuler toutes garanties pour que s'investissent sans crainte, et dans la plus grande confiance, les capitaux publics et privés sans lesquels il n'est pas possible de concevoir la mise en place de grandes sources d'énergie et des usines de transformations.
We are willing to make every guarantee to ensure the investment, without fear and in the greatest confidence, of the public and private capital without which the establishment of great power sources and factories of transformation is impossible.

Between 1960 and 1963, the Congo registered 38 billion CFA francs gross of investment in its territory, for a GDP estimated at 30 billion CFA francs in 1961. Mineral resources alone attracted 21 billion CFA francs, with manganese exploited by the Compagnie minière de l'Ogooué (COMILOG) and potassium by the Compagnie des potasses du Congo (CPC). Of the remaining 17 billion CFA francs, 3 billion (18%) were invested in the primary sector, 2.7 billion (15%) in industry, 6.3 billion (37%) in the tertiary sector, and 5 billion (30%) in non-economic programmes like education, health, urbanisation and housing. Despite Youlou's liberal policies, only 5.5 billion (32%) of this 17 billion came from private capital; international aid (notably from France) supplied 7 billion (41%) and the Congolese government 4.5 billion (27%).

In terms of the balance of trade, the situation seemed to improve during Youlou's presidency. Thus in 1960, the commercial deficit was 5.7 billion CFA francs and in 1963 it was down to 4.1 billion. Each year Congolese exports (excluding diamonds) increased, from 6.1 billion in 1960 to 7.9 billion in 1963. Around half of this sum came from timber. The products of light industry, such as sugar, made up more than a quarter of exports. Furthermore, the commercial deficit was greatly reduced by transit tax. Congo in fact derived significant revenue from its railroad and port infrastructure, which allowed it to serve neighbouring countries. In 1963 this transit brought Congo 2.3 billion CFA francs in revenue.

==== Corruption and major projects ====
Youlou's administration was not very concerned about its budget deficit. Between 1960 and 1963, the deficit rose to 2.4 billion CFA francs. France graciously financed 1.2 billion. The rest was covered by advances from the French treasury. To recover the financial situation, fiscal pressure rose from 17% of GDP in 1960 to 26% in 1963 while austerity measures were introduced in the administration: heads of civil service offices lost their official vehicles, travel expenses were no longer reimbursed, and advances were blocked. The President, the ministers and the deputies were exempt from these measures.

To make the government more representative of Congolese society, many ministerial appointments were made on the basis of regional origin rather than competence, creating problems for the country's development. Furthermore, members of government were responsible for several financial scandals – Youlou most of all. The Congolese head of state had an acute sense of staging; conscious that his religious appearance lent him political power, he continued to wear his religious garb and to employ the nickname "Abbé" (Abbot) as well as "Kiyunga" (the Lari word for "cassock"). It is reported that his wardrobe, which contained a full collection of cassocks in white, black, and red, was supplied by the famous fashion designer Christian Dior. It is also reported that for an official visit to France, Youlou had 59 billion CFA francs assigned for his personal expenses. The national economy suffered as a result of this mismanagement of public funds. Economic growth was too modest to absorb high levels of unemployment exacerbated by rapid urbanisation.

However, Congo possessed remarkable assets for its development. In addition to its mineral wealth and its timber, the country had notable hydro-electric possibilities at Sounda, near Pointe-Noire, on the Kouilou-Niari River. The construction of a dam on this site would enable the production of 8 billion kilowatt hours of electricity per year and the development of heavy electro-metallurgic and chemical industry, offering significant employment. Enthusiastic about this project, Youlou nevertheless faced two major problems: the incredible cost, estimated at 100 billion CFA francs and the Congo's insufficient supply of bauxite, a key material for the project. Youlou attempted to remedy these issues through an active foreign policy.

=== A "moderate" foreign policy ===
By an anti-communist and pro-western policy, termed "moderate", Youlou attempted to attract foreign investment in his country. From independence, he affirmed his desire to pursue a policy of co-operation with France and the other Francophone countries of Africa. From 15 to 19 December 1960, he held an intercontinental conference in the Congolese capital, which assembled the "moderate" Francophone heads of state. At the end of this conference, the "groupe de Brazzaville" was created, an anti-communist block which was the ancestor of the African and Malagasy Union (OCAM).

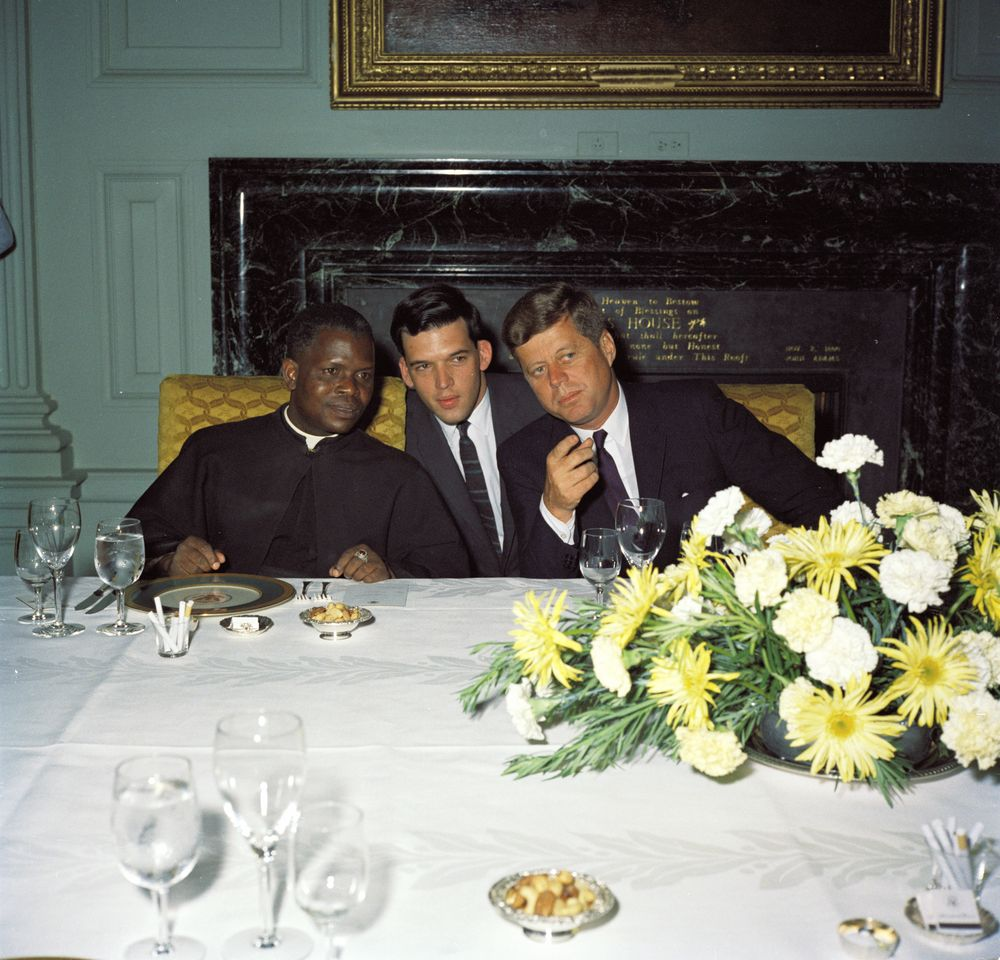
Fulbert Youlou meeting with President Kennedy during his 1961 trip to the United States

Among the guests of this conference were the President of the Democratic Republic of Congo, Joseph Kasa-Vubu, and the Katanga leader Moïse Tshombe. Abbé undoubtedly brought them together in order to isolate the Congolese nationalist Patrice Lumumba, accused of communist sympathies. Although he invited both, Youlou showed more support for the very controversial Tshombe than for Kasa-Vubu. In exchange for economic assistance with the planned Sounda dam, Youlou provided Tshombe with logistical support necessary for the separatist regime. However, his counterpart in Léopoldville was a Kongo like him; they appeared at the time to cherish the hope of reuniting a massive Bakongo state. Abbé took other controversial positions; although Angola was subject to violent colonial repression, he was the only leader to call for dialogue with the Portuguese dictator António de Oliveira Salazar.

Despite his visceral anti-communism, Youlou sought to establish relations with the "revolutionary" Ahmed Sékou Touré of Guinea. He sought, in fact, Guinea's bauxite mines – essential for the Kouilou dam project. Thus, in 1962 he travelled to Guinea. On 5 and 6 June 1963, it was the turn of Sékou Touré to visit Congo, where he was acclaimed by militant unions and youth. On the occasion of his trip, the Guinean leader made encouraging economic promises:

La Guinée est riche en minerais et elle est disposée, je le dis, à mettre à disposition du Congo toutes les quantités de bauxite ou de fer nécessaires à la réalisation du Kouilou et plus tard à la rentabilité de l'usine qui sera construite.
Guinea is rich in minerals and is disposed, I say, to put whatever amounts of bauxite and iron necessary for the completion of Kouilou and for the profitability of subsequent factories, at Congo's disposal.

=== Revolution of the 'Trois Glorieuses' ===
Even before independence, Congo-Brazzaville was effectively dominated by a single dominant party. In August 1962, Fulbert Youlou announced his intention to institutionalise this one-party state « afin de sceller la réconciliation et l'unité nationale réalisées » (in order to seal the reconciliation and national unity). He did not experience any opposition; on the contrary, the decision appeared to be enthusiastically received by the MSA leader Jacques Opangault. In pursuit of this goal, a round table was organised for 3 August 1963, gathering the leaders of the three parties (UDDIA, MSA and PPC), the relevant unions, representatives in the National Assembly and leaders of the Congolese army. Although not opposed to a one-party state in principle, the unions refused to accept the system proposed by Youlou, on the grounds that they appeared to serve only his interests.

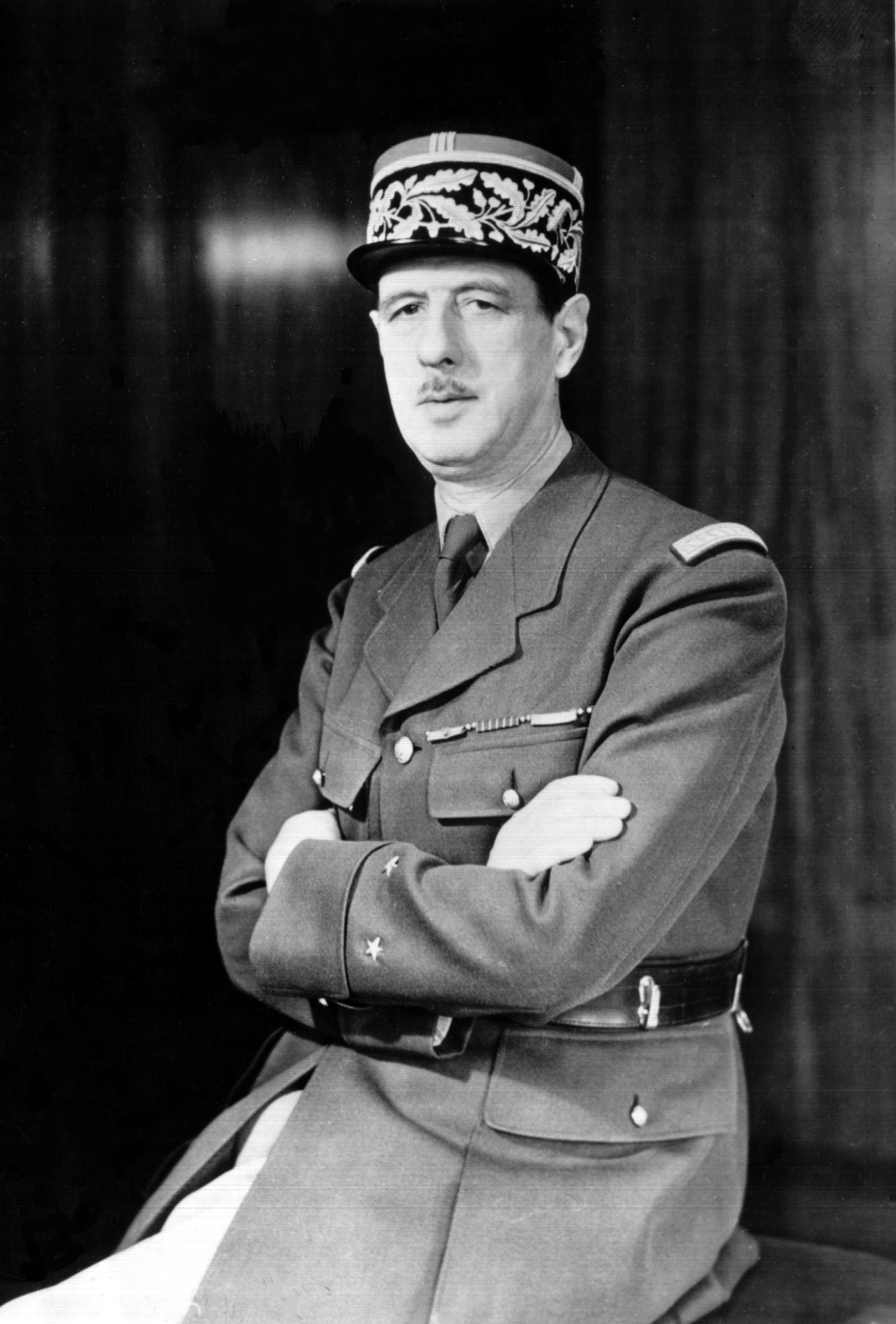
General Charles de Gaulle.

In order to demonstrate their disapproval, the Congolese trade unions decided to organise an « arrêt de protestation » (protest strike) on 13 August at the Labour exchange in Brazzaville. The day before this protest, in the night, Youlou had the principal union leaders arrested. When this news was announced, the simple protest transformed into a true anti-governmental action. The protestors planned to raid the prison in order to free the union leaders, leading to clashes with security forces. Hundreds of unionists were killed. When they finally succeeded, the arrested leaders could not by found. The anti-governmental protest turned into a riot; the country was paralysed. The French army co-operated with the Congolese forces in order to re-establish order. That evening, Abbé instituted a curfew, declared a state of emergency and called for calm on the radio.

The next day, around noon, Youlou declared on the radio:

En raison de la gravité de la situation, je prends en mon nom personnel les pouvoirs civils et militaires. Un comité restreint, placé sous l'autorité du chef de l'État, aura pour tâche le rétablissement de l'ordre, la reprise du travail et la mise en place des réformes qui s'imposent.
On account of the gravity of the situation, I take, in my name, civil and military authority. A select committee under the authority of the Head of State will be charged with restoring order, returning people to work and instituting the necessary reforms.

In the evening, the government was dissolved. However, the ministers Jacques Opangault, Stéphane Tchitchéllé and Dominique Nzalakanda were retained in their roles. On the announcement that the very unpopular Nzalakanda had been retained, the militant supporters of Youlou decided to join the protestors. On the morning of 15 August, the mob marched on the Presidential Palace to demand Youlou's resignation. Some bore placards saying « À bas la dictature de Youlou » (For the fall of Youlou's dictatorship) or « Nous voulons la liberté » (We want freedom). The unionists managed to secure the sympathy of two captains of the Congolese army. One of them, Captain Félix Mouzabakani, was Youlou's nephew. Youlou called de Gaulle and requested French assistance, unsuccessfully asking that French troops near Brazzaville free the Presidential Palace. Accepting the situation, Youlou announced his resignation as President of the Republic, Mayor of Brazzaville and Member of the National Assembly.

The new regime dubbed the protests of 13, 14 and 15 August 1963 "revolutionary" and named them the « Trois glorieuses » (Three Glorious Days).

== Forced retirement ==
=== Detention and exile ===
The evening of his resignation, Youlou was imprisoned at the Fulbert Youlou military camp. A few weeks later he was transferred with his family to the Djoué army camp. He appeared to be treated well. Realising that Youlou's days were numbered, his successor as head of state, Alphonse Massamba-Débat, helped him to flee to Léopoldville on 25 March 1965. The Prime Minister of the Democratic Republic of Congo, Moïse Tshombe, immediately granted him political asylum.

On 8 June 1965 a trial of Youlou by popular tribunal began in Congo-Brazzaville. He was accused of genocide, misappropriation of public funds, and of using a Heron war-plane which had been received from the French government for personal purposes. Furthermore, he was held responsible for the death of the three unionists during the assault on the prison on 13 August 1963. He was also charged with having supported the Katangan secession orchestrated by Moise Tshombe. The court condemned him to death in his absence and ordered the nationalisation of all his property, notably a farm at Madibou and two luxury hotels in Brazzaville. Youlo defended himself against these accusations by the publication of a book, J'accuse la Chine (I accuse China), really an anti-communist pamphlet, in 1966.

In November 1965, Youlou expressed a desire for the French government to allow him to settle in Nice to receive medical care. But the former Congolese leader was not in favour in Paris. Yvonne de Gaulle, a fervent Catholic, did not like the eccentric priest, who had continued to wear the cassock although defrocked and who openly publicized his polygamy (he had no less than four official wives). Against the advice of General de Gaulle, Youlou disembarked at Bourget with his wives and children. Despite the advice of his councillor for African Affairs Jacques Foccart, de Gaulle seriously considered returning him to Léopoldville. Finally, Youlou was sent to Spain, where Francisco Franco's regime treated him well. The French government put 500,000 francs at his disposal for him to maintain himself.

=== Aborted coup d'etat and anathema ===
After Youlou stepped down, Congo-Brazzaville failed to enjoy political stability. After protests by pro-Youlists in February 1964, supporters of the former regime attempted a coup on 14 July 1966 and again in January 1967 leading to the deaths of several thousand people. Eventually, the Marxist captain Marien Ngouabi succeeded Alphonse Massamba-Débat. Shortly after taking the presidency, he denounced the Youlist plots which were orchestrated by captain Félix Mouzabakani (Youlou's nephew) and Bernard Kolelas in February and November 1969. On 22 March 1970, a Youlist coup d'état was attempted by lieutenant Pierre Kinganga, but it too failed.

The socialist and revolutionary regime which succeeded Youlou held him responsible for all the country's problems. His name was struck from public discourse. It was in this atmosphere that Youlou died of hepatitis in Madrid on 5 May 1972. Representatives of the Lari people called for the return of his body so that it could receive the necessary funerary rites. President Ngouabi allowed this, in order to avoid the development of a Matswanist messianic movement around his image. On 16 December 1972, after his remains had lain in state for three days in the Brazzaville Cathedral, they were interred in his home village of Madibou, without any official ceremony. His memory was rehabilitated at the National Conference of 1991 which restored multi-party democracy in the Republic of Congo.

== Publications ==
- Le matsouanisme (Matswanism), Imprimerie centrale de Brazzaville, 1955, 11 p.
- Diagnostic et remèdes. Vers une formule efficace pour construire une Afrique nouvelle (Diagnosis and Remedy: Towards an Effective Formula for Building a New Africa), Éditions de l'auteur, 1956
- L'art noir ou les croyances en Afrique centrale (Black Art or the Beliefs of Central Africa), Brazzaville, undated.
- L'Afrique aux Africains (Africa for Africans), Ministry of Information, 1960, 16 p.
- J'accuse la Chine (I Accuse China), La table ronde, 1966, 253 p.
- Comment sauver l'Afrique (How to Save Africa), Imprimerie Paton, 1967, 27 p.

== Bibliography ==
- Amin, Samir; Coquery-Vidrovitch, Catherine (1969). Histoire économique du Congo 1881–1968. Éditions Anthropos. ASIN B000WID61A.
- Boutet, Rémy (1990). Les trois glorieuses ou la chute de Fulbert Youlou. Collection Afrique contemporaine. Éditions Chaka. ISBN 2907768050.
- Bernault, Florence (1996). Démocraties ambiguës en Afrique centrale: Congo-Brazzaville, Gabon, 1940-1965 (in French). Paris: Karthala. ISBN 2-86537-636-2. OCLC 36142247.
- Bazenguissa-Ganga, Rémy (1997). Les voies du politique au Congo : essai de sociologie historique. Éditions Karthala. ISBN 978-2-86537-739-8.
- Clark, John F. (1997). "Congo: Transition and the Struggle to Consolidate". In Clark, John F.; Gardinier, David E. (eds.). Political Reform in Francophone Africa. Boulder, CO: Westview Press. ISBN 0-8133-2785-7. OCLC 35318507.
- Daggs, Elisa (1970). All Africa: All Its Political Entities of Independent Or Other Status. New York: Hastings House. ISBN 0-8038-0336-2. OCLC 82503.
- Decraene, Philippe (1973). "Congo-Brazzaville". Éncyclopédie Universalis. Vol. 4. pp. 891–892.
- Gale Research Company (1999). Encyclopedia of World Biography. Vol. 16. Detroit, MI: Gale Research Company. ISBN 0-7876-2221-4. OCLC 37813530.
- Italiaander, Rolf (1961). The New Leaders of Africa. Englewood Cliffs, NJ: Prentice Hall. OCLC 565528.
- Kouvibidila, Gaston-Jonas (2001). La marche à rebours 1940-1991. Histoire du multipartisme au Congo-Brazzaville. Vol. 1. Éditions L'Harmattan.
- Lentz, Harris M. (1994). Heads of States and Governments: A Worldwide Encyclopedia of Over 2,300 Leaders, 1945 through 1992. Jefferson, NC: McFarland & Company. ISBN 0-89950-926-6. OCLC 30075961.
- Matthews, Ronald (1966). African Powder Keg: Revolt and Dissent in Six Emergent Nations. London: The Bodley Head. OCLC 246401461.
- Mbandza, Joseph (2004). Pauvreté et modèles de croissance en Afrique subsaharienne: le cas du Congo-Brazzaville (1945–2000). Éditions Publibook.
- Mengisteab, Kidane; Daddieh, Cyril, eds. (1999). State Building and Democratization in Africa. Westport, CT: Greenwood Press. ISBN 0-275-96353-5. OCLC 39013781.
- Terray, Emmanuel (1964). "Les révolutions congolaise et dahoméenne de 1963". Revue française de science politique. 14 (5): 918–925. doi:10.3406/rfsp.1964.403464.
- Young, Eric (1999). "Youlou, Fulbert". In Appiah, Kwame Anthony; Gates, Henry Louis Jr. (eds.). Africana: The Encyclopedia of the African and African American Experience. New York, NY: Basic Books. ISBN 0-465-00071-1. OCLC 41649745.

Political offices
Preceded by Jacques Opangault	Prime Minister of the Republic of the Congo; 1958–1959	Succeeded by Alphonse Massemba-Débat post abolished, 1959–1963
Preceded by (none)	President of the Republic of the Congo; 1960–1963	Succeeded by Alphonse Massemba-Débat
