= André Kerhervé =

André Kerhervé (born 14 August 1911 in Quimperlé) was a French politician, active in Congo-Brazzaville. Kerhervé managed a printing business. Politically, he labelled himself an Independent. He was heading the UDSR in Moyen-Congo. In 1957 he was elected to the Territorial Assembly as an African Socialist Movement (MSA) candidate. On 8 December 1958 he was named Minister of Industrial Production in the government of Fulbert Youlou (along with another socialist member of the assembly, Albert Fourvelle).
