= Mokoko =

Mokoko may refer to:

== People ==
- Émile Mokoko Wongolo
- Jean-Marie Mokoko

== Other uses ==
- The Japanese name of the generation II Pokémon Flaaffy

== See also ==
- Makoko, a settlement in Nigeria
