= Follo =

Follo may refer to:

== People ==
- Francesco Follo (born 1946), Italian priest
- Raymond Isaac Follo, Congolese politician

== Places ==
- Follo, Liguria, Italy
- Follo, Norway

== Other ==
- Follo (newspaper), Norwegian newspaper
- Follo Arbeiderblad, Norwegian newspaper
- Follo FK, Norwegian football club
- Follo HK Damer, Norwegian handball club
