= Makoumbou =

Makoumbou is a surname. Notable people with the surname include:

- Antoine Makoumbou (born 1998), French-Congolese footballer
- Rhode Makoumbou (born 1976), Congolese painter
