= Albert Fourvelle =

Albert Fourvelle (born December 17, 1916, Mabirou) was a Congolese politician. Fourvelle was of mixed African-European heritage. He worked as a trader, and became an active socialist. In 1952 he was elected to the Territorial Assembly (by the second college).

He was re-elected in 1957 as a candidate of the African Socialist Movement (MSA) from Alima-Lefini. On December 8, 1958, he was named a minister in the government of Fulbert Youlou (along with another socialist member of the assembly). The members of his party reacted negatively to him joining Youlou's cabinet, calling it a breach of party discipline. He was expelled from MSA on January 20, 1959. Fourvelle subsequently joined Youlou's UDDIA party.
