= Caiman (disambiguation) =

A caiman is an alligatorid in the subfamily Caimaninae.

Caiman may also refer to:

== Arts and media ==
- The Caiman (in Italian Il caimano), a 2006 Italian comedy-drama film directed by Nanni Moretti
- Le Caïman, a play by Antoine Rault
- The Caïmans, characters in the Belgian comics series La Ribambelle

== Military ==
- USS Caiman, a US Navy submarine
- BAE Caiman, an armored vehicle used by the US military

== Other uses ==
- Caiman (genus), a genus of caimans within the alligatorid subfamily Caimaninae
- Caiman (singer), Russian musician
- Efraín Sánchez (1926–2020), Colombian former football goalkeeper nicknamed "El Caimán"
- Caimans, the athletics teams of Hostos Community College, New York City, New York, US

== See also ==
- Caiman Marine, a French version of the NHIndustries NH90 military helicopter
- Los Caimanes National park, an area of the Buenavista biosphere, Sabana-Camagüey Archipelago, Cuba
- Los Caimanes, a Peruvian football club
- Caimanes de Barranquilla, a Colombian Professional Baseball League team based in Barranquilla
- FS Class E.656, an Italian electric locomotive nicknamed "Caimano" (Caiman)
- Cayman (disambiguation)
