= Trade unions in the Republic of the Congo =

Global Rights Index
- 3 Regular violations of rights

International Labour Organization
- Republic of the Congo is a member of the ILO

Convention ratification
- Freedom of Association: 1960
- Right to Organise: 1999

There are four main trade union centers in the Republic of the Congo (Congo).

== Repression ==
The ITUC ranked the Republic of the Congo a score of 3 on the Global Rights Index in 2024, due its regular repression of trade union leaders including arrests, union busting and restrictions on strikes.

== History ==
Congo was colonized by France as part of the larger French Equatorial Africa until 1960. Trade unions developed during colonialism. After Congo became independent, three trade union confederations formed:

- Congolese Confederation of Free Trade Unions (CCSL; Confédération Congolais des Syndicats Libres) – socialist
- General African Confederation of Workers (CGAT; Confédération Generale Africaine des Travailleurs) – communist
- African Confederation of Worker Believers (CATC; Catholic Confédération Africaine des Travailleurs Croyants) – Christian

In 1960, leaders of the communist CGAT were arrested for attempting to form a revolutionary party. The first president of Congo, Fulbert Youlou wanted a single trade union confederation that was aligned with his political party. When Youlou declined the trade union confederations' suggestion of a Trade Union Merger Committee as an interim solution, the trade unions organized a 3-day general strike in August 1963, leading to the downfall of the Youlou government. The provisional government of Alphonse Massamba-Débat carried out the original plan, merging the political parties into the MNR and consolidating the confederations into the provisional Congolese Trade Union Confederation (CSC; Confédération Syndicale Congolaise). After Débat was elected president, leaders of CATC and CGAT were given prominent political posts in the MNR party.

Shortly before the inaugural congress of the CSC, CATC dropped out and subsequently was not represented on the executive. The executive consisted of 3 representatives from CGAT, 3 from CCSL, 1 from the civil servant association and 1 from the postal workers' federation. The CATC president was imprisoned and its general secretary went into exile.

== See also ==
- Trade unions in the Democratic Republic of the Congo
