= Pascal Gamassa =

Pascal Gamassa is a Congolese politician. He served for a time as Congo-Brazzaville's Ambassador to Gabon and is a leading member of the Pan-African Union for Social Democracy (UPADS).

== Political career ==
Gamassa is a cousin of Pascal Lissouba, who founded UPADS and was President of Congo-Brazzaville from 1992 to 1997. He held a diplomatic post as Ambassador to Gabon for a time. In the mid-2000s, Gamassa played a central role in the factional dispute regarding the UPADS leadership. Contesting the claims of Paulin Makita to the party leadership, Gamassa claimed to have been appointed by Lissouba to lead a commission that was assigned the task of preparing for a UPADS party congress; unlike Makita, he appeared to enjoy the backing of party "barons". Makita denounced Gamassa's claim, alleging that Lissouba's signature was forged on the documents appointing Gamassa. According to Makita, the party barons did not like him for various reasons: because he was politically inexperienced, because he had Lissouba's confidence, because he was a supporter of internal party democracy, and because he was popular with the party base.

As President of the National Preparatory Commission for the UPADS Congress, Gamassa said at a press conference on 16 March 2006 that the commission's purpose was to "identify the future leaders of UPADS". He also said that some expelled members had been rehabilitated for the sake of party democracy, and he stressed the party's stance towards the government of Denis Sassou Nguesso: "UPADS is firmly in the opposition, not to a man, much less to an ethnic group, but to a regime."

UPADS held its First Extraordinary Congress on 27–28 December 2006, electing Pascal Tsaty Mabiala to lead the party as its Secretary-General. After the congress, Gamassa continued to hold a top leadership post in the party, serving as one of its Vice-Presidents with responsibility for overseeing the UPADS Council of Vice-Presidents. Alongside Tsaty Mabiala, Gamassa participated in a May 2007 opposition rally in Brazzaville demanding the creation of an independent electoral commission prior to the June 2007 parliamentary election and threatening to boycott the vote otherwise.

Gamassa stood as a UPADS candidate in the indirect August 2008 Senate election. He received 43 votes in Niari Region, not enough to win one of Niari's six seats.

Paulin Makita continued to contest Gamassa's claim to have been assigned the task of leading the party to an extraordinary congress; in doing so, he challenged the legitimacy of the extraordinary congress and consequently the legitimacy of the UPADS leadership that was derived from the congress. He took his complaint to a French court, alleging that Lissouba's signature was forged on the documents, but his complaint was dismissed by a judge on 4 September 2008. Gamassa hailed the decision as "a confirmation of the legality of the extraordinary congress".

In a by-election for a Senate seat that was held in Niari Region on 28 February 2010, Gamassa stood as the UPADS candidate but was defeated by Georges Ouavelakedi, the candidate of the Rally for the Presidential Majority (RMP). Gamassa received 47 votes against 77 votes for Ouavelakedi in the indirect election.

Gamassa, along with representatives from other UPADS factions, signed a declaration to reunify the party on 1 September 2010. Among other things, the declaration stated that a party congress would be held and a new party leadership would be elected to finalize the reunification.
