= Cayman =

Cayman may refer to

== Places ==
- Cayman Islands, a British Overseas Territory comprising three islands:
  - Grand Cayman, the largest island
  - Cayman Brac
  - Little Cayman

== Other uses ==
- HMS Cayman, a British frigate
- Porsche Cayman, a car
- AMD Radeon HD6900 GPU series (codename Cayman), in the Northern Islands GPU family
- Caiman or cayman, an alligatorid of Central and South America

== See also ==
- Caiman (disambiguation)
