= Caiman (singer) =

- Also known as: Денис Александрович Баранов
- Born: Denis Alexandrovich Baranov; May 10, 1994 (age 31); Nizhny Novgorod, Nizhny Novgorod Oblast, RSFSR, USSR
- Origin: Russia
- Genres: Pop music
- Occupations: Musician, songwriter, record producer, singer, composer
- Instrument: Guitar
- Years active: 2023–present
- Labels: Make It Music

Denis Alexandrovich Baranov (born May 10, 1994, Nizhny Novgorod, Nizhny Novgorod Oblast, RSFSR, USSR), better known by his stage name Caiman, is a Russian musician, songwriter, record producer, singer, composer.

== Biography ==
Born May 10, 1994 in Nizhny Novgorod. At the age of 16 he gave his first concert in his city with BeatBox. At the age of 21, he moved to Moscow, where he worked for the first time in Yandex Taxi, on a construction site, as a waiter. He released about 60 songs during his time in Moscow.

In 2023 release «Ты его забудь», and in February 2024, he released a music single «Цвет твоих глаз». A short time later, he released a single «Не жди». In the same year, 2024, he released the releases: «Первая весна», «Улетаешь», «Первый букет», «В теме», «Поболит и всё», «Меланхолия», «Атлантида».

== Discography ==
=== Singles ===
Year	Name
2023	«Ты его забудь»
2024	«Цвет твоих глаз»
2024	«Не жди»
2024	«Первая весна»
2024	«Улетаешь»
2024	«Первый букет»
2024	«В теме»
2024	«Поболит и всё»
2024	«Меланхолия»
2024	«Атлантида»
