= Jean-Pierre Lékoba =

Congolese politician

Jean-Pierre Heyko Lékoba is a Congolese politician who has been Prefect of Niari Department since 2008. Previously he was a Deputy in the National Assembly of Congo-Brazzaville from 2002 to 2007.

Lékoba was Divisional Inspector in charge of Legal and Financial Administrative Control at the Ministry of the Forest Economy, Fish, and Fishery Resources from 1996 to 1997. He was Special Adviser to Prime Minister Charles David Ganao in 1997.

In the May–June 2002 parliamentary election, Lékoba was elected to the National Assembly as a candidate in Etoumbi constituency. He was also elected as Co-Chairman of the ACP-EU Parliamentary Assembly's Economic Development, Finance, and Trade Committee on 29 March 2003 at a meeting in Brazzaville.

Lékoba served in the National Assembly until the end of the parliamentary term in 2007. He was then appointed as Prefect of Niari on 14 October 2008.

At the Sixth Extraordinary Congress of the Congolese Labour Party (PCT), held in July 2011, Lékoba was elected to the PCT's 471-member Central Committee.
