= Alphonse Gondzia =

Congolese politician

Alphonse Gondzia (born 1937?) is a Congolese politician who has served in the Senate of Congo-Brazzaville since 2002. He has also been President of the Senate's Judicial and Administrative Affairs Commission since 2002.

== Political career ==
Gondzia was born at Likombo in the Dongou District of Likouala Region, located in the far north of Congo-Brazzaville, around 1937. During the single-party rule of the Congolese Labour Party (PCT), Gondzia was elected to the PCT's 75-member Central Committee at its Third Ordinary Congress, held on 27–31 July 1984. As of 1990, he was a member of the PCT Secretariat, in charge of administration. He worked as Secretary-General of the Ministry of Territorial Administration during the 1990s.

Later, Gondzia stood in the July 2002 Senate election as a PCT candidate in Likouala Region, and he was elected as a Senator. When the Senate began meeting, Gondzia was elected as President of the Senate's Laws and Administration Commission on 23 August 2002. He was additionally designated as the head of the Senate's Congo–China friendship group on 13 December 2004, and he was re-elected as President of the Laws, Administration, and Human Rights Commission on 11 October 2005.

Gondzia held a Christmas dinner for 400 children in Dongou in December 2005; he also distributed rice and school supplies. He was a member of the PCT Political Bureau as of 2006; acting as a representative of the PCT, he visited China in June 2006 to attend a Chinese Communist Party seminar regarding development, aid, and other issues involving African nations. On that occasion, he noted that China's investment in Congo was concentrated in infrastructure and he expressed hope that "there will be more investment in other fields".

Together with many other parties, the PCT formed the Rally of the Presidential Majority (RMP), a grouping of parties supporting President Denis Sassou Nguesso, in December 2007. Gondzia then led a six-member RMP delegation to Cuvette-Ouest Department in February 2008 in order to oversee the establishment of the RMP's organizational structures in that department.

Standing as an RMP candidate, Gondzia was re-elected to the Senate in the August 2008 Senate election. He received the votes of 42 of the 57 electors in Likouala, more than any other candidate in Likouala, and thus won the first of the six seats available for the department. Following the election, Gondzia was assigned to head an 11-member ad hoc commission that was responsible for drawing up some modifications to the Senate's internal regulations on 20 August 2008. When the Senate met again on 29 August 2008, the modified internal regulations were adopted and Gondzia was re-elected as President of the Senate's Judicial and Administrative Affairs Commission, in line with a proposal to maintain the existing heads of the Senate commissions in their posts.

During a working visit to Likouala from 23 December 2008 to 3 January 2009, Gondzia distributed gifts in the village of Ikouangala, including an electrical generator and a television with a DVD player and satellite dish. He distributed an assortment of other gifts that had been donated by the Chinese Ambassador to Congo. Gondzia also used the visit to highlight the ongoing revision of the voter rolls in preparation for the 2009 presidential election.

Gondzia was named a Grand Officer of the Congolese Order of Merit on 16 August 2011. Following the October 2011 Senate election, he was re-elected as President of the Senate's Judicial and Administrative Affairs Commission on 24 October 2011.

Gondzia was re-elected to the Senate in October 2014 as a PCT candidate in Likouala, receiving 42 of the 57 possible votes.
