= Codjo François Azodogbehou =

Beninese politician

Codjo François Azodogbehou is a politician from Benin. He was a Central Committee member of the People's Revolutionary Party of Benin and Minister of Rural Development and Cooperative Action. He is now a spokesperson of the National Election Commission.
