= 1957 Moyen-Congo Territorial Assembly election =

French Congo elections

Territorial Assembly elections were held in Moyen-Congo on 31 March 1957. The Democratic Union for the Defence of African Interests and the African Socialist Movement both won 17 seats. Voter turnout was 74.2%.

== Results ==
The parties were in two broad coalitions; the coalition led by the African Socialist Movement (MSA) won 23 seats, 17 taken by the MSA, two by the Congolese Progressive Party and French Section of the Workers' International and one by the Democratic and Socialist Union of the Resistance and the Rally of the French People. The Democratic Union for the Defence of African Interests–Moyen-Congo Union (UDDIA–UMC) alliance won 22 seats, with 17 taken by the UDDIA and five by the UMC. In Kouliou, the UDDIA–UMC coalition ran as the Union for the Defence of Kouilou.

Party	Votes	%	Seats
UDDIA–UMC	125,083	43.87	22
MSA–PPC–SFIO–UDSR–RPF	124,720	43.74	23
Congolese Progressive Party	30,121	10.56	0
Movement for the Social Evolution of Black Africa	3,027	1.06	0
Independent Socialists	1,376	0.48	0
Independents	780	0.27	0
Total	285,107	100.00	45
Valid votes	285,107	95.88	
Invalid/blank votes	12,249	4.12	
Total votes	297,356	100.00	
Registered voters/turnout	400,847	74.18	
Source: Sternberger et al.
