= Loufoulakari Falls =

Waterfall in the Republic of the Congo

Coordinates: 4°35′7.0″S 14°58′59.8″E

The Loufoulakari Falls (French: Chutes de Loufoulakari) lie 80 km south west of Brazzaville in the Republic of the Congo at the confluence of the Loufoulakari River and the Congo River. The falls are over 40 meters tall.
