= Patrice Yengo =

Francophone Congolese political anthropologist

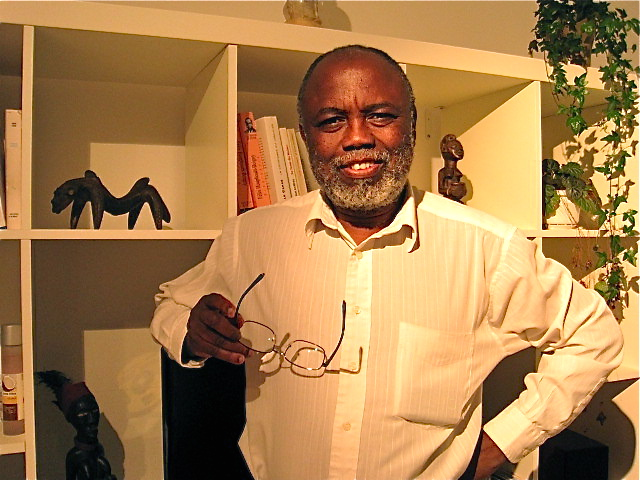
Yengo in June 2011

Patrice Yengo (born 1949) is a francophone Congolese political anthropologist living and teaching in Paris, France. He is a specialist of the Congolese Civil War (1993–2002), otherwise known as the Republic of the Congo Civil War. He is originally from Pointe-Noire, Republic of the Congo (Congo-Brazzaville).

He studied pharmacology in Kharkov in Ukraine and in Paris, France. He has taught pharmacology in the School of Medicine at the University of Congo-Brazzaville Marien Ngouabi. Patrice Yengo later received a doctorate in Political Anthropology at the École des Hautes Études en Sciences Sociales (EHESS), where he is currently an affiliate lecturer with the Center for African Studies (Institut des mondes africains). He obtained his Habilitation in anthropology in 2007. He is the head editor of the series, Rupture-Solidarité (aka Rupture nouvelle série) and a principal founding member of the Association Rupture-Solidarité, an organization of Congolese dissident intellectuals. He has taught at various universities in Paris and has also been a fellow at the Nantes Institute for Advanced Studies, France.

Yengo's works have analyzed the degeneration of the democratic process in postcolonial Congo and the ethnicization of political conflicts since independence. He has written about the conflict and violence that erupted after the exceptional gathering of 1202 delegates of the 1991 National Congress, in which he himself participated. According to Yengo, the democratization process launched by the National Congress fell prey to key military leaders whose alliances and competition were based on regional divisions that existed prior to independence. The contest for power among these leaders relied on the loyalties of the regional militia, and fueled extreme violence. His book also points to the intimate ties between the French oil industry, the Fifth Republic governments, and the dictatorship in the Congo since the beginning of the Congolese Civil War.

Patrice Yengo has also published works on medical anthropology in Africa, child soldiers and child witches, the postcolonial degeneration of kinship ties, and the perverse "fetishization" of traditions in the context of globalization and postcolonial capitalism in modern Congo-Brazzaville.

Since 2011, Yengo is one of the researchers of the ELITAF, the international research program on the African elites trained in the countries of the former Soviet bloc.

== Publications ==
- Le venin dans l'encrier, Les conflits du Congo-Brazzaville au miroir de l'écrit. Paris: Paari, 2009. ISBN 2-84220-030-6
- La guerre civile du Congo-Brazzaville, 1993-2002 Chacun aura sa part. Paris: Editions Karthala, 2006. ISBN 978-2-84586-815-1.

–Edited Works—

- Rupture nouvelle série no 6, “Le Gabon malgré lui,” ed. Patrice Yengo, Paris, Karthala, 2005.
- Rupture nouvelle série no. 5, “Rites et dépossessions,″ ed. Patrice Yengo, Paris, Karthala, 2004.
- Rupture nouvelle série no. 4, “Résistances et dissidences,” ed. Patrice Yengo, Paris, Karthala, 2003.
- Rupture nouvelle série, no. 3, “L'Afrique centrale des droits de l'homme,” ed. Patrice Yengo, Paris, Karthala, 2001.
- Rupture nouvelle, série no. 2, “Les Congos dans la tourmente,” ed. Patrice Yengo, Paris, Karthala, 2000.
- Rupture nouvelle série no. 1, “Congo-Brazzaville, dérives politiques, catastrophe humanitaire, désirs de paix,” ed. Patrice Yengo, Paris, Karthala, 1999.
- Identités et Démocratie. Paris, L'Harmattan, 1997.

–Works online and other Articles—

- “Brazzaville's Marché Total,” Cahiers d'études africaines 182. 2006.
- “Le monde à l'envers: Enfance et kindoki ou les ruses de la raison sorcière dans le bassin du Congo,” Cahiers d'études africaines 189-190. 2008.
- "Affinités électives et délégation des compétences: la politique congolaise de Jacques Chirac," in France-Afrique. Sortir du Pacte colonial no. 105 (2007): 105-125.
