= Madzengue Younous =

Congolese politician

Madzengue Younous is a Congolese politician from likouala.

He served as Minister of Higher Education, Science and Technology during the transition period 1991-1992. At the time he also chaired the Congolese National Committee for UNESCO.

Younous is a leader of the Congolese Green Party.
