= Justin Ballay Mégot =

Congolese political figure

Justin Ballay Mégot is a Congolese political figure. He served in the government of Congo-Brazzaville as Minister-Delegate for Development Cooperation and La Francophonie from 2002 to 2005, as Minister at the Presidency for Cooperation and Development from 2005 to 2007, and as Minister at the Presidency for Subregional Integration and the New Partnership for Africa's Development (NEPAD) from 2007 to 2009. He has been a member of the Constitutional Court of Congo-Brazzaville since 2012.

== Life and career ==
Ballay Mégot was the Congolese Ambassador to East Germany, Czechoslovakia, and Poland for a time. He was later appointed to the government on 18 August 2002 as Minister-Delegate for Development Cooperation and La Francophonie, working under the Minister of Foreign Affairs; he was installed in office by Foreign Minister Rodolphe Adada on 23 August. He was subsequently moved to the post of Minister at the Presidency in charge of Cooperation and Development on 7 January 2005, then to the post of Minister at the Presidency for Subregional Integration and NEPAD on 3 March 2007.

Ballay Mégot was not included in the government appointed on 15 September 2009. Subsequently, he was appointed as a member of the Constitutional Court on 29 May 2012 and he was sworn in together with the other eight members of the Court on 15 June 2012.
