= Raymond Isaac Follo =

Congolese politician

Raymond Isaac Follo is a Congolese politician who has served in the National Assembly of Congo-Brazzaville since 2012.

== Life and career ==
At the Sixth Extraordinary Congress of the Congolese Labour Party (PCT), held in July 2011, Follo was elected to the PCT's 471-member Central Committee.

In the July–August 2012 parliamentary election, Follo stood as the PCT candidate in Ngoyo constituency, located in Pointe-Noire. In the first round of voting, he placed first with 30% of the vote, ahead of Henri Tchimbakala Mavoungou of the Rally for Democracy and Social Progress (RDPS), who received 15.63%. The PCT and the RDPS were both members of the Presidential Majority loyal to President Denis Sassou Nguesso, and as a result of an agreement between the parties, Tchimbakala Mavoungou, as the second place candidate, withdrew from the vote in favor of Follo. Consequently, Follo was elected without opposition in the second round of voting, receiving 100% of the vote.

When the National Assembly began meeting for its new parliamentary term, Follo was designated as Secretary of the Planning, Spatial Planning, Environment and Housing Commission of the National Assembly on 19 September 2012.

On 23 February 2013, Follo held his first meeting with his constituents, discussing parliamentary work and donating shovels, hoes, and wheelbarrows, as well as office equipment and school supplies.

Follo was elected as President of the PCT District Committee for Ngoyo on 8 September 2013.

On 12 October 2013, Follo held his second constituent meeting, discussing the work of the National Assembly and the passage of various items of legislation. He reiterated that he wanted to remain close to his constituents by holding regular constituent meetings, rotating through the different parts of the constituency. He also encouraged people to register to vote, and he gave out school kits to Ngoyo's best performing students.

Follo held his third constituent meeting on 1–2 February 2014. He variously donated beds, mattresses, and cement to local medical facilities, schools, and churches. Discussing his parliamentary work, he explained his proposed amendments to the 2014 state budget. These amendments, which were included in the budget, concerned various infrastructure improvements in Ngoyo: the completion of a local town hall, expansion and improvement of local medical facilities, and construction work at schools.

Follo headed the PCT's candidate list in Ngoyo for the September 2014 local elections and was elected as a local councillor. In the July 2017 parliamentary election, he was re-elected to the National Assembly as the PCT candidate in Ngoyo, winning the seat in the first round with 70% of the vote. He was designated as Rapporteur of the Planning Commission of the National Assembly on 2 September 2017.
