= Rhode Makoumbou =

Congolese painter (born 1976)

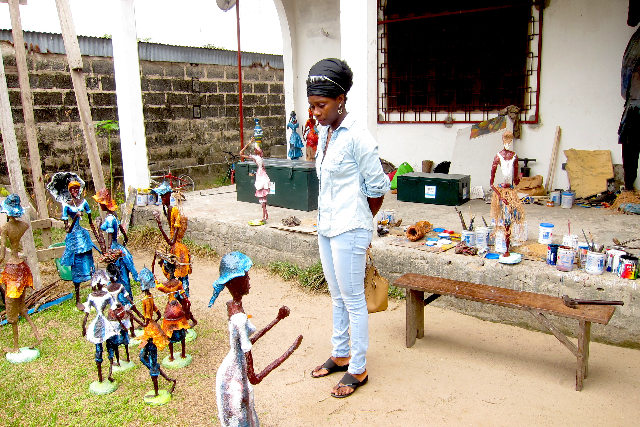
Rhode Makoumbou with some of her art

Rhode Bath-Schéba Makoumbou (born 29 August 1976) is an artist from the Republic of the Congo. Working in oil painting and sculpture, she has exhibited around the world. She works from Brussels and Brazzaville. In 2012, she won the Grand Prix of Arts and Letter of the President of the Republic (of Congo), and the next year was appointed an officer in the Ordre du Dévouement Congolais.

== Career ==
Rhode Bath-Schéba Makoumbou was born on 29 August 1976 in Brazzaville, Republic of the Congo, and is the daughter of painter David Makoumbou. Makoumbou has been creating art since 1989, originally oil paintings made with a knife. These are considered to be distinctly African, but with influences from realism, expressionism, and cubism. Since 2002, she has also worked in sculpture, creating figures out of sawdust and wood glue over a metal frame. These tend to be depictions of dying rural African trades, and some are up to 3 metres (9.8 ft) tall.

Makoumbou's work has featured in more than 230 exhibitions across the world. She won the 2012 Grand Prix of Arts and Letter of the President of the Republic. She has since moved to Brussels, Belgium. She was appointed an officer of the Ordre du Dévouement Congolais by President Denis Sassou Nguesso at the opening of the Pan-African Music Festival on 13 July 2013. The award was for her artistic abilities and also her work to spread awareness of Congolese art throughout the world.

Makoumbou has experimented with hairstyling, creating traditional and modern hairstyles on models that were exhibited at the Brussels Ethno Tendance Fashion Week in November 2017. She maintains workshops in Brussels and Brazzaville.
