= 1959 Republic of the Congo parliamentary election =

Parliamentary elections were held in the Republic of the Congo on 14 June 1959. The result was a victory for the Democratic Union for the Defense of African Interests, which won 51 of the 61 seats.

== Results ==
Party	Votes	%	Seats	+/–
Democratic Union for the Defense of African Interests	199,309	57.93	51	+34
African Socialist Movement–Congolese Progressive Party	144,766	42.07	10	–9
Total	344,075	100.00	61	+16
Valid votes	344,075	99.48		
Invalid/blank votes	1,808	0.52		
Total votes	345,883	100.00		
Registered voters/turnout	446,199	77.52		
Source: Sternberger et al.
