= Alexis Ndinga =

Congolese politician

Alexis Ndinga is a Congolese politician who has served in the National Assembly of Congo-Brazzaville since 2012. He also heads CAPO Generation, a political association.

== Political career ==
In the July–August 2012 parliamentary election, Ndinga stood as an independent candidate in the first constituency of Lumumba, a district in Pointe-Noire. In the first round of voting, he placed first with 25.63% of the vote, ahead of Paul Ngababa of the Congolese Labour Party (PCT), who received 21.56%. He easily defeated Ngababa in the second round of voting, receiving 77.21% of the vote.

While serving as a Deputy, Ndinga also headed a political association, CAPO Generation (the Association of the Political Action Circle Generation, Génération CAPO). The association, which supported President Denis Sassou Nguesso, focused its activities on social and economic development, particularly on providing job training for young people. It was founded in Pointe-Noire and later expanded its activities to Dolisie.

At a meeting with constituents on 12 January 2014, Ndinga discussed the state budget for 2014 and listened to complaints from constituents about local problems.

In March 2014, Ndinga donated 400 mattresses to people affected by flooding in Pointe-Noire. He announced on 13 March 2014 that CAPO Generation would compete across the country in forthcoming local and senatorial elections. He also took the occasion to applaud the media for its work, and he donated cameras and recording equipment to local media outlets.

Ndinga assisted the police force of Pointe-Noire and Kouilou by paying for its internet access for several years; he also donated motorcycles, and on 30 April 2014 he donated bicycles.

Standing as a CAPO Generation candidate, Ndinga was elected as a local councillor in the Lumumba section of Pointe-Noire in the September 2014 local elections.

In the July 2017 parliamentary election, he was re-elected to the National Assembly as the PCAP candidate in the first constituency of Lumumba, winning the seat in the first round with 52% of the vote. He was a candidate in the election for the post of Mayor of Pointe-Noire on 24 August 2017, receiving 20 votes from the city councillors against 64 for Jean François Kando, who was elected.
