= Rock Itoua-Ndinga =

Congolese footballer

Personal information
- Date of birth: 10 August 1983 (age 43)
- Place of birth: Republic of the Congo
- Height: 1.78 m (5 ft 10 in)
- Position: Central midfielder

Senior career*
| Years | Team | Apps | (Gls) |
| 2002–2003 | Agios Dimitrios | | |
| 2003–2004 | Atromitos | | |
| 2005 | Panachaiki | | |
| 2005–2006 | University of Nigeria | | |
| 2006–2007 | Pobeda Prilep | | |
| 2008 | Škendija 79 | | |
| 2008 | Rabotnički Skopje | | |
| 2009 | Horizont Turnovo | | |
- * Club domestic league appearances and goals as of 1 September 2009

Rock Itoua-Ndinga (born 10 August 1983) is a Congolese professional football player.

He played in Greece with Agios Dimitrios F.C., Atromitos and Panachaiki He was shortly with University of Nigeria before moving to the Republic of Macedonia where he would play wit several teams in the Macedonian First League, namely FK Pobeda, FK Škendija, FK Rabotnički and FK Turnovo.
