= Bill Kouélany =

Congolese artist (born 1965)

- Born: B. Kouélany; 31 October 1965 (age 60); Brazzaville, Republic of the Congo
- Occupations: artist, writer, set designer

Bill Kouélany (born 31 October 1965 in Brazzaville) is a Congolese artist, writer and set designer. In 2007, she participated in Documenta 12 in Kassel with a multimedia art installation. She lives in Brazzaville, the capital of the Republic of the Congo.

== Life and career ==
As a teenager, B. Kouélany (as she prefers to be called) lived through the wars and violence in her native Congo. Years later the imprints of those early experiences can be found in her writings and art.

=== Writer ===
A French speaker, her early writings include plays such as Cafard, cafarde (Cockroach, cockroach), which she presented in Paris (2003), and Peut-être (Perhaps) (2007), which she wrote with colleague Jean-Paul Delore. Her written pieces reveal evidence of influence by the notable Congolese poet and novelist Tchicaya U Tam’si, who is remembered as "a tormented and highly sensitive writer who [B. Kouélany] also featured in her first canvases."

B. Kouélany's autobiographical novel, Kipiala ou le Rage d'Être Soi (Kipiala or the Rage to Be Yourself) was published by the French publishing house, Les Avrils, in 2021. The book is 342 pages long. An interpretation of the book was directed by dancer and performer Sam BB at the Sahm workshops in 2022, featuring an interdisciplinary cast of performing and dance artists.

As of 2016, many of her writings have never been published.

=== Painter ===
B. Kouélany's paintings reveal the artist's self-taught skills as well as their autobiographical elements, making her art sought out among international audiences in Africa and Europe. Since 2007, her work has been distributed internationally by the Peter Hermann Gallery in Berlin and the RDV Gallery in Nantes, France.

In 2001, she took part in the residency program of the Doual’Art urban workshops in Cameroon. In 2002, her work was invited to the Dak’Art Biennale with the Creators of Central Africa, and in 2006 she submitted art to the seventh Dak’Art. In 2004, she was named an artist in residence in Nantes, France and took part in an exhibition there called Beautés d’Afrique (Beauties of Africa). In 2006, again at the Dak’Art Biennale exhibition, she received two prizes, the Prix de la Francophonie and Prix Montalvo Arts Center.

B. Kouélany's submission the following year to an exhibition called documenta 12 in Germany was widely noticed. The work, called Untitled, was a very large installation examining the consequences of war and violence.

In 2007, B. Kouélany was the first sub-Saharan African woman to exhibit at Documenta in Kassel. She presented her largest piece to date: a paper maché wall with excerpts of texts from several international newspapers and warped videos of her face, in which she expresses, as a mother and daughter, her empathy toward the Congolese people.

=== Media ===
In collaboration with Cameroonian artist Goddy Leye, B. Kouélany produced the video Chocolate Banana (2010) during a residency in Guangzhou with SPARCK (Space for Pan-African Research, Creation and Knowledge). The video explores migration between Africa and China. The video was designed to play on small LCD screens found in taxis in Guangzhou.

=== Mentor ===
In 2012, B. Kouélany founded the contemporary art centre and workshop space, Les Ateliers Sahm, in Brazzaville, becoming its artistic director. The multidisciplinary centre supports contemporary art in Congo and is devoted to supporting young artists, not only from her country but the rest of the African continent as well. According to the Prince Claus Fund, the creation of Les Ateliers Sahm "is perhaps one of her greatest achievements."

She continues to work creatively. In 2019, she took part in the exhibition Prête-moi ton rêve (Lend me your dream) in Morocco, which featured other painters from African and was scheduled (at the time) to visit multiple countries.

== Awards ==
- 2006: Prix de la Francophonie (France)
- 2006: Montalvo Arts Center Prize (USA)
- 2018: Officer of Arts and Letters, awarded by the French Ministry of Culture.
- 2019: Prince Claus Prize in the Netherlands.
