= Émile Mokoko Wongolo =

Congolese politician

Émile Mokoko Wongolo is a Congolese politician who has been Director-General of the National Water Distribution Company (Société nationale de distribution d'eau, SNDE), a state-run company in Congo-Brazzaville, since 2010. Previously he was Secretary-General of the African Timber Organization, elected to that post in 2002.

== Career ==
From 1980 to 1989, Mokoko Wongolo was President Denis Sassou Nguesso's Adviser for State Enterprises and the Private Sector.

He was President and General manager of National Electricity company (SNE) from 1989 to 1991.

Mokoko Wongolo was elected as Secretary-General of the African Timber Organization at its 20th Ministerial Conference, held in Kinshasa on 21–26 October 2002. He replaced Paul Ngatse-Obala, also from Congo-Brazzaville, who died in March 2002.

He briefly served as first adviser at the Embassy of the Republic of Congo in the USA the same year(2002).

Appointed as Secretary-General of the SNDE on 22 May 2010, Mokoko Wongolo was installed in that post on 23 June 2010.

At the Sixth Extraordinary Congress of the Congolese Labour Party (PCT), held in July 2011, Mokoko Wongolo was elected to the PCT's 471-member Central Committee.
