= Jacques Opangault =

Prime Minister of the Republic of the Congo from 1957 to 1958

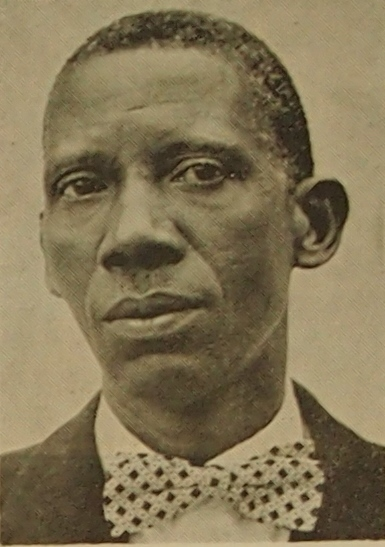

1st Prime Minister of the Republic of the Congo
- In office April 1957 – 28 November 1958
- Succeeded by: Fulbert Youlou

Personal details
- Born: 13 December 1907 Ikagna
- Died: 20 August 1978 (aged 70)
- Party: Mouvement Socialiste Africain

Jacques Opangault (13 December 1907 – 20 August 1978) was a Congolese politician. The founder of the Mouvement Socialiste Africain (MSA; English: African Socialist Movement), he competed with Félix Tchicaya's Parti Progressiste Congolais (PPC; English: Congolese Progressive Party) during two-party rule in Congo during the 1950s.

== Life ==
He was born on 13 December 1907, in Ikagna. In 1947, he was elected to the Territorial Assembly. In 1957, he was prime minister of the provisional government. In 1959, he was jailed after riots in Brazzaville. From June 1961 to April 1962, he was vice president under Fulbert Youlou. In 1963, he was arrested, after the fall of his government. He retired from politics.

He died on 20 August 1978.

Political offices
Preceded by Position created	Prime Minister of Congo-Brazzaville; 1957-1958	Succeeded by Fulbert Youlou
