= Democratic Union for the Defense of African Interests =

Democratic Union for the Defense of African Interests Union démocratique de défense des intérêts africains
- Founder: Fulbert Youlou
- Founded: 1956
- Dissolved: 1963
- Ideology: Youlouism: Congolese nationalism Francophilia; Conservatism; Economic liberalism Anti-communism
- Political position: Centre-right
- International affiliation: RDA (from 1957)

The Democratic Union for the Defense of African Interests (French: Union démocratique de défense des intérêts africains, UDDIA) was a conservative, Francophile political party in the early years of the Republic of the Congo. The UDDIA was founded in 1956 by Fulbert Youlou.

In the territorial election of March 1957, the UDDIA won 21 of 45 seats and Youlou became prime minister of a minority government the next year.

In the 1958 referendum on a new French constitution, the UDDIA supported a "yes" vote.

In the pre-independence election of 1959, the UDDIA won 51 of 61 seats and Youlou formed a coalition government with his rival Jacques Opangault of the African Socialist Movement (MSA).

The Republic of the Congo achieved independence from France on 15 August 1960, and Youlou became president of the new state.

In 1963, after Youlou attempted to make the Congo a one-party state, he was overthrown in the Trois Glorieuses and fled the country; his party was dissolved.
