= Jean Baptiste (Chadian politician) =

Chadian politician (1920–c. 1964)

Mayor of Fort-Lamy
- In office 9 June 1961 – 21 September 1961

Minister of the Economy
- In office 26 March 1959 – 10 February 1960
- Prime Minister: François Tombalbaye
- In office 8 December 1958 – 30 January 1959
- Prime Minister: Gabriel Lisette

Minister of Social Affairs, Health and Labour
- In office June 1959 – 10 February 1960
- Prime Minister: François Tombalbaye

Minister of Public Works, Transports and Civil Aviation
- In office 13 February 1959 – 13 March 1959
- Prime Minister: Gontchomé Sahoulba

Minister of Planning, Agriculture and Cooperation
- In office 15 May 1957 – 17 May 1958
- Prime Minister: Gabriel Lisette
- Preceded by: Position established

Personal details
- Born: 1920 French Chad
- Died: c. 1964 (aged 43–44) Ounianga Kébir or Fort Archambault, Chad
- Party: UDT (1952–1953); UDIT (from 1953); PNA (from 1960)
- Occupation: Merchant

Military service
- Allegiance: Free France
- Rank: Sergeant
- Battles/wars: World War II

Jean Baptiste (1920–c. 1964) was a Chadian politician. A mixed-race trader, he entered politics in 1952 as a Muslim conservative. He emerged as the leader of the Independent Democratic Union of Chad (UDIT) party, and was a significant political broker. He held various ministerial cabinet posts between 1957 and 1960, and in 1961 he was the mayor of the Chadian capital Fort-Lamy (later renamed N'Djamena). In 1963 he was arrested, and died in captivity.

== Early life, youth and war ==
Accounts of Jean Baptiste's early life are limited. Per Mario Azevedo and Samuel Decalo he was born in either Salamat or Ennedi. Per French military records, he was born on 24 April 1920 in Goz Beïda (a place of birth also mentioned by Bernard Lanne). Per a 2023 interview with one of his sons, he hailed from Fada. Jean Baptiste was from mixed French and Chadian racial heritage, but raised in a Muslim environment. Baptiste was a transporter by profession. He joined the Free French Forces in August 1940. He served in General Philippe Leclerc de Hauteclocque's land forces, reaching the rank of sergeant.

== Entry into politics ==
After the war, he became a businessman in Fort-Lamy. Baptiste entered politics in 1952, as a member of the conservative Muslim party the Chadian Democratic Union (UDT). He was supported by Mahamat Jimeni (chief of the Anakaza tribe), Allenga Allatchimi (chief of the Gada tribe) and Abidor. Baptiste emerged as an important political broke in Ouaddaï. Baptiste contested the 1952 Chad Territorial Assembly election as a UDT candidate in the Borkou-Ennedi-Tibesti region, and was elected.

Baptiste was elected to the Grand Council of French Equatorial Africa in 1952.

== Party leader ==
Ahead of the October 1953 election of a representative to the French Union Assembly, a split occurred in the UDT-RPF. Former governor Jacques Rogué decided to contest the election, in opposition to René Malbrant and René Laurin. Rogué founded a party of his own — the Independent Democratic Union of Chad (UDIT). UDIT gathered a section of Europeans in Fort-Lamy and a small number of Africans. Baptiste became the leader of UDIT, albeit Rogué functioned as the main advisor the party.

Ahead of the 1956 French legislative election, André Kieffer and Baptiste stood as candidates on the list of UDIT in the Second College (Africans). The UDIT list got 19,483 votes. The UDIT list had strong backing in the Ouaddaï and Batha regions, and less so in Kanem, Chari-Baguirmi and Mayo-Kebbi regions.

Baptiste joined the Chadian Progressive Party (PPT)-led alliance ahead of the 1956 local elections, and he was elected as the Fourth Deputy Mayor of Fort-Lamy.

== Cabinet berths ==
UDIT allied with the PPT in the 1957 Territorial Assembly election (within the Republican Entente). Baptiste was re-elected to the assembly, thanks to the pact with PPT. In May 1957 became a minister in the first government council of Chad (led by Gabriel Lisette). The slate of government ministers was approved in a vote in the Territorial Assembly on 14 May 1957. The following day the governor René Troadec assigned the ministerial portfolios through a decree, with Baptiste holding the post of Minister of Planning, Agriculture and Cooperation.

However, the Republican Entente coalition did not last long. In November 1957 UDIT and Chadian Social Action (AST) formed a joint intergroup to contest Finance Committee seats, against the candidates of PPT and UDSR. The clash over the Finance Committee was soon smoothed over, albeit tensions remained.

On 4 January 1958 a heated dispute erupted in the Territorial Assembly over the elections of Chadian representatives to the Organisation commune des régions sahariennes (Joint Organization of Saharan Regions, OCRS). There was a sharp exchange of words between Baptiste and Lisette. UDIT fielded Baptiste and fellow assembly member Allatchimi Issa Allatchimi from the Borkou-Ennedi-Tibesti region for the two OCRS seats. Lisette proposed Moussa Yayami (PPT Borkou-Ennedi-Tibesti unit secretary) and Ahmed Mangué (assembly member from Longine), PPT party nominations that Baptiste considered inapt to represent the Borkou-Ennedi-Tibesti region in OCRS.

Similar tensions over government appoints continued during 1958. Baptiste was removed from his ministerial post on 17 May 1958. Per Dingammadji (2011) he was expelled from the government due to the decision of Baptiste to enter form an alliance (the Chadian Socialist Union, UST) with Ahmed Koulamallah to challenge the governing coalition in the 1 June 1958 partial legislative elections in Chari-Baguirmi. Per Virginia Thompson McLean the straw that broke the camel's back was an argument in the Territorial Assembly over the selection of a Chadian representative for the World Congress of Mothers in Paris. The PPT nominated an unmarried mother, who was an organizer of PPT women's branches. Baptiste denounced the nomination in a very fierce way, prompting his removal from the government.

Baptiste was named Minister of Economics in the first provisional government of the union (headed by Lisette) on 8 December 1958. The first provisional government did not last for long. On 30 January 1959 GIRT leader Gontchomé Sahoulba pulled out of the governing Entente coalition and joined forces with the UST (Baptiste and Koulamallah) to overthrow the Lisette cabinet. The Lisette government fell on 10 February 1959. On 13 February 1958 the Constituent Legislative Assembly voted to allow Sahoulba to form a second provisional government, with Baptiste as the Minister of Public Works, Transports and Civil Aviation.

The third provisional government, led by Koulamallah, was voted into power by the Constituent Legislative Assembly on 13 March 1959. Baptiste was notably excluded from the Koulamallah-led cabinet, despite a situation where virtually every other major politician was given a ministerial berth. Baptiste's exclusion was caused by his dispute with Koulamallah, as the two politicians had a long-running personal rivalry. The conflict between the two leaders was in part rooted in tensions between the Tijaniyyah Sufi order and the Wahhabi Muslim community (which Baptiste led as its chairman). Baptiste worked hard to undermine the Koulamallah cabinet, and eventually the dispute between the two politicians led to the collapse of the third provisional government on 24 March 1959.

On 26 March 1959 a fourth provisional government led by François Tombalbaye was formed, with Baptiste as Minister of Economics and Tourism, and provisionally in-charge of Health and Population. In the subsequent Tombalbaye-led government, formed in June 1959, Baptiste was named Minister of Social Affairs, Health and Labour.

== PNA chairman and Fort-Lamy mayor ==
In January 1960 UDIT, AST, GIRT and MSA regrouped into the African National Party (PNA), an uneasy coalition of northern Muslim opposition forces that brought together the arch-enemies Baptiste and Koulamallah. Baptiste became the founding executive chairman of the new party. Having participated in the formation of PNA, Baptiste was dismissed from his ministerial post on 10 February 1960. However, within PNA Baptiste would find himself increasingly isolated as he favoured cooperation with the PPT.

In 1961 there was a moment of rapprochement between PNA and PPT, leading to the creation of the Union for the Progress of Chad. In this context Baptiste was named mayor of Fort-Lamy, upon the suggestion of Tombalbaye, on 9 June 1961. But new alliance between PNA and PPT would not last for long, contrary to the pact between the two parties PNA presented its own candidate lists for the August 1961 municipal elections. Baptiste now faced pressure from both sides of the political spectrum. He was expelled from PNA for 'treason'. Koulamallah denounced that Baptiste colluding with PPT to create a false, docile opposition. Baptiste was accused of having traded the control over municipalities to PPT in exchange for keeping his post as Fort-Lamy mayor. On the other hand PPT now saw him as non grata after the PNA breach of the pledge for a single PPT-PNA candidate list for the Fort-Lamy municipal election.

Tombalbaye, as Head of State, removed Baptiste from the post as Fort-Lamy mayor on 21 September 1961. Baptiste was accused of plotting against the Head of State. His parliamentary mandate was cancelled. Baptiste's Chadian citizenship was revoked, with the argument that he had only one Chadian parent. Baptiste rejected the measure to deny him Chadian citizenship, arguing that he had already renounced his French citizenship. He was arrested and detained for a while. After release from detention, he was placed under police surveillance.

== Riots and arrest ==
On 16 September 1963 Djibrine Kherallah, Koulamallah and Baptiste held a political meeting at Kherallah's house in Fort-Lamy. Kherallah and Baptiste were arrested at the meeting, accused of practicing racism. Following the arrests violent riots broke out between Muslims and non-Muslims in Fort-Lamy, Am Timan and some other locations. Official statements indicated that over 100 people died in the riots, but unofficial estimates were much higher (over 500 dead by some accounts).

Baptiste was taken to the Ounianga Kebir region in Borkou-Ennedi-Tibesti prefecture. He was never seen in public again.

== Death in jail ==
Baptiste died in jail, but accounts on when and where Baptiste died differ. Per his followers, he died as early as 1964. Per one account he died in Ounianga Kebir region. Another account argues that he died after torture at Fort Archambault in 1964. The government only acknowledged his death in 1971, after the announcement of the release of 148 political prisoners. Following the amnesty announcement, president Tombalbaye stated that Baptiste had been killed by another inmate (former Presidential Cabinet Director Silas Benoit Selingar, jailed since 1966), supposedly at Baptiste's own request.

His son René Baptiste (then a high school student) was also arrested in the 1963 crack-down. René Baptiste was released from jail in April 1971, shortly after the announcement of his father's death.
