= List of elections in 1969 =

The following elections occurred in 1969.

== Africa ==
- 1969 Botswana general election
- 1969 Chadian parliamentary election
- 1969 Chadian presidential election
- 1969 Ethiopian general election
- 1969 Ghanaian parliamentary election
- 1969 Kenyan general election
- 1969 Rhodesian constitutional referendum
- 1969 Rwandan general election
- 1969 Somali parliamentary election
- 1969 Tunisian general election
- 1969 United Arab Republic parliamentary election
- 1969 Zambian constitutional referendum

== Asia ==
- 1969 Afghan parliamentary election
- 1969 Israeli legislative election
- 1969 Israeli municipal elections
- 1969 Japanese general election
- 1969 Malaysian general election
- 1969 Mongolian parliamentary election
- 1969 Philippine House of Representatives elections
- 1969 Philippine Senate election
- 1969 Philippine general election
- 1969 Philippine presidential election
- 1969 Republic of China legislative election
- 1969 Sarawak state election
- 1969 South Korean constitutional referendum
- 1969 Thai general election
- 1969 Turkish general election
- 1969 United Arab Republic parliamentary election

=== India ===
- 1969 Indian presidential election
- 1969 Indian vice presidential election

== Europe ==
- 1969 Andorran parliamentary election
- 1969 Gibraltar general election
- 1969 Irish general election
- 1969 Liechtenstein local elections
- 1969 Portuguese National Assembly election
- 1969 Norwegian parliamentary election
- 1969 Polish parliamentary election
- 1969 Romanian parliamentary election
- 1969 San Marino general election
- 1969 Turkish general election
- 1969 Yugoslavian parliamentary election

=== France ===
- 1969 French presidential election
- 1969 French constitutional referendum

=== Germany ===
- 1969 West German federal election
- 1969 West German presidential election

=== United Kingdom ===
- 1969 United Kingdom local elections
- 1969 Birmingham Ladywood by-election
- 1969 Brighton Pavilion by-election
- 1969 Chichester by-election
- 1969 Glasgow Gorbals by-election
- 1969 Islington North by-election
- 1969 Louth by-election
- 1969 Mid Ulster by-election
- 1969 Newcastle-under-Lyme by-election
- 1969 Northern Ireland general election
- 1969 Paddington North by-election
- 1969 Swindon by-election
- 1969 Ulster Unionist Party leadership election
- 1969 Walthamstow East by-election
- 1969 Wellingborough by-election
- 1969 Weston-super-Mare by-election

== North America ==
=== Canada ===
- 1969 British Columbia general election
- 1969 Manitoba general election
- 1969 New Democratic Party of Manitoba leadership election
- 1969 Ottawa municipal election
- 1969 Toronto municipal election
- 1969 Progressive Conservative Party of New Brunswick leadership election

=== United States ===
==== United States lieutenant gubernatorial ====
- 1969 Virginia lieutenant gubernatorial election

==== United States gubernatorial ====
- 1969 Maryland gubernatorial special election
- 1969 New Jersey gubernatorial election
- 1969 United States gubernatorial elections
- 1969 Virginia gubernatorial election

==== United States House of Representatives ====
- 1969 United States House of Representatives elections

==== United States mayoral elections ====
- 1969 Allentown mayoral election
- 1969 Cleveland mayoral election
- 1969 Detroit mayoral election
- 1969 Los Angeles mayoral election
- 1969 Manchester, New Hampshire mayoral election
- 1969 New York City mayoral election
- 1969 Pittsburgh mayoral election
- 1969 St. Louis mayoral election
- 1969 Springfield, Massachusetts mayoral election

== Oceania ==
- 1969 New Zealand general election
- 1969 Tongan general election

=== Australia ===
- 1969 Australian federal election
- 1969 Bendigo by-election
- 1969 Curtin by-election
- 1969 Gwydir by-election
- 1969 Lake Macquarie state by-election
- 1969 Queensland state election
- 1969 Tasmanian state election

== South America ==
- 1969 Brazilian presidential election
- 1969 Chilean parliamentary election
- 1969 Surinamese general election
