= Abbo Nassour =

El-Hadj Abbo Nassour Abdoulaye Sabre (born 1927, Kapka, d. 1982) was a Chadian politician. Born in a Northern family, he served in several ministerial functions before being jailed 1963. He was later released and returned to the political limelight 1969–1975.

== Early years ==
Abbo Nassour was born in a Zaghawa family. He was the nephew of Sultan Abderrahmane of Kapka and at the same time a descendant of a rival family of Sultans of Kapka. This family had been removed from power in 1936 by the French colonial authorities as the French sought to put all Zaghawa areas under the control of Sultan Haggar of Kobé. Abbo Nassour's father, Abdoulaye Sabre Nassour, was the last Sultan of this dynasty. Abbo Nassour would retain a strong grudge against the Haggars for many years to come, seeing them as accomplices of the French colonial authorities. Abbo Nassour completed primary education, after which he served as secretary of the Sultan of Iriba.

== Territorial Assembly ==
Nassour was elected from Ouaddaï Prefecture to the Territorial Assembly of Chad in the 1952 election. He was re-elected in the March 31, 1957 election. He served as secretary of the Bureau of the Territorial Assembly 1957–1958. As of 1958, he was a member of the Independent Democratic Union of Chad (UDIT).

After Ahmed Kotoko had relinquished his seat after the June 1958 elections, Nassour was put forth as the UST candidate to represent Chad in the General Council. In the vote in the Territorial Assembly on October 15, 1958, he finished in second place with 23 votes against 32 for the Entente candidate Ali Kosso.

Nassour was re-elected to the Territorial Assembly in the 1959 election.

== Minister ==
Nassour held a number of ministerial posts between 1958 and 1963. From 1958 to 1959 he served as Minister of Cooperation.

He was named Minister of Economic Affairs and Financies in the provisional government of Gontchomé Sahoulba formed on February 11, 1959. This government functioned until March the same year. He served as Minister of Finance from March–June 1959. On April 21, 1960, Abbo Nassour was named Minister without portfolio.

On June 2, 1960, he was named Minister of Interior. In the power struggles between 1960 and 1962, Nassour was one of the key Northern politicians backing up François Tombalbaye. In return for Nassour's support Tombalbaye created the Biltine Prefecture, which enabled Nassour to concentrate his political position in the area. As Minister of Interior of Tombalbaye 1960–1962, he was instrumental in building the repressive apparatus of the new regime.

He was re-elected to parliament in the 1962 election. Between May and August 1962 Abbo Nassour served as Minister of Civil Service, on August 23, 1962, he was appointed Minister of State for Public Function.

== In jail ==
In the night of March 21/22, 1963 Nassour was one of a number of politicians (mainly Muslims) jailed by the new one-party state under Tombalbaye. A special tribunal, chaired by Kodébri Nagué, was held between June 7, 1963, and July 24, 1963, for Abbo Nassour and other accused in 'the March 22 plot'. Nassour was sentenced to death, accused of having conspired with Sudanese militaries against the Chadian state.

== President of the National Assembly ==
After years in prison, Nassour was given amnesty in June 1969 as part of the reconciliation process initiated by Tombalbaye. By the December 1969 parliamentary election, Nassour had moved to the government side and was elected a Member of Parliament as a Chadian Progressive Party candidate from Biltine. Nassour was named President of the National Assembly of Chad on December 30, 1969, and remained in this function until the fall of Tombalbaye on April 13, 1975.

As president of the National Assembly, Nassour led a delegation to visit Libya in December 1970, the first Chadian state visit after Colonel Muammar Gadhafi seized power. In Tripoli he met with the exiled rebel leader, derde Oueddei Kichidemi, although the Chadian government initially denied such reports.

After his rehabilitation, Nassour became a member of the Political Bureau of PPT. Later he was included in the Executive Council of the National Movement for the Cultural and Social Revolution (MNRCS).

== Death ==
After the end of the Tombalbaye regime in 1975, Nassour was arrested. He was killed in 1982 on the orders of Hissein Habré.
