= Civic Action Front of Chad =

Political alliance in Chad

Civil Action Front of Chad Front d'action civique du Tchad
- Abbreviation: FACT
- President: Ahmed Koulamallah
- Secretary-General: Pierre Toura Gaba
- Founded: 1951
- Dissolved: 1952

The Civic Action Front of Chad (French: Front d'action civique du Tchad, FACT) was a short-lived political alliance in French Chad.

== History ==
FACT was formed as an alliance of the Chadian Progressive Party and the Independent Socialist Party of Chad, and was initially named the "Front for the Defence of Civic Rights", but was renamed as the Civic Action Front on 19 May, just eleven days before the 1952 Territorial Assembly elections. The alliance put up electoral lists in five of the ten second college constituencies, winning six of the 30 seats, with the remaining 24 won by the Chadian Democratic Union. The President of FACT was Ahmed Koulamallah and its Secretary-General was Pierre Toura Gaba. It was dissolved shortly after the 1952 elections due to internal disputes.
