= 1956 French legislative election in Chad–Ubangi-Shari =

Elections to the French National Assembly were held in Chad and Ubangi-Shari on 2 January 1956. The territories elected four seats to the Assembly via two electoral colleges; the first college spanned both territories and elected one seat, whilst Chad elected two seats via the second college and Ubangi-Shari one. René Malbrant was re-elected from the first college and Barthélémy Boganda from the second college in Ubangi-Shari. In the second college in Chad the Chadian Union and Chadian Social Action won one seat each, taken by Gabriel Lisette and Arabi El Goni respectively.

== Campaign ==
The Chadian Union alliance was formed by the Chadian Progressive Party, the Independent Socialist Party of Chad, the Democratic and Socialist Union of the Resistance and the Radical Socialist Party to contest the second college seat in Chad, nominating Gabriel Lisette and Djeraki Zaïd as its candidates.

== Results ==
=== First college ===
Candidate	Party	Votes	%
René Malbrant	National Centre of Social Republicans	2,852	66.45
René Appaix	French Section of the Workers' International	881	20.53
André Vazel	National Centre of Independents and Peasants	559	13.02
Total		4,292	100.00
Valid votes		4,292	94.52
Invalid/blank votes		249	5.48
Total votes		4,541	100.00
Registered voters/turnout		6,176	73.53
Source: Sternberger et al.

=== Second college ===
==== Chad ====
Party	Votes	%	Seats	+/–
Chadian Union–UDSR	130,843	44.41	1	+1
Chadian Social Action–CNRS	105,258	35.72	1	New
French Section of the Workers' International	28,254	9.59	0	New
Independent Democratic Union of Chad	19,467	6.61	0	New
Chadian Democratic Workers' Bloc	5,989	2.03	0	New
Chadian Bloc–IOM	4,843	1.64	0	New
Total	294,654	100.00	2	0
Valid votes	294,654	97.98		
Invalid/blank votes	6,062	2.02		
Total votes	300,716	100.00		
Registered voters/turnout	551,545	54.52		
Source: Sternberger et al.

==== Ubangi-Shari ====
Candidate	Party	Votes	%
Barthélemy Boganda	Movement for the Social Evolution of Black Africa–CNIP	155,952	88.52
Jean-Baptiste Songo-Mali	National Centre of Independents and Peasants	20,230	11.48
Total		176,182	100.00
Valid votes		176,182	97.30
Invalid/blank votes		4,881	2.70
Total votes		181,063	100.00
Registered voters/turnout		271,577	66.67
Source: Sternberger et al.
