= Independent Socialist Party =

Independent Socialist Party may refer to:

- Independent-Socialist Party, New York State, United States
- Independent Socialist Party (Argentina)
- Independent Socialist Party (Bolivia)
- Independent Socialist Party (Bolivia, 1944)
- Independent Socialist Party (Greece)
- Independent Socialist Party (Hungary)
- Independent Socialist Party (Ireland)
- Independent Socialist Party (Luxembourg)
- Independent Socialist Party (Netherlands)
- Independent Socialist Party (Romania)
- Independent Socialist Party (Turkey)
- Independent Socialist Party (UK)
- Independent Socialist Party of Chad
- Independent Socialist Party of Chad (1955)

== See also ==
- Independent Socialist Faction
- List of socialist parties
