= African National Party =

Political party in Chad (1960–1963)

The African National Party (French: Parti national africain, PNA) was a political party in Chad. PNA was founded on January 30, 1960, through the merger of remnants of four parties based in the Muslim-dominated northern Chad; African Socialist Movement, Chadian Social Action, Independent Democratic Union of Chad and Grouping of Rural and Independent Chadians. Initially, PNA held 25 seats in the National Assembly, but the party suffered from defections to the Chadian Progressive Party, first the number of MPs went down to 17 and then to ten. In April 1961, PNA merged with the Chadian Progressive Party at a Unity Congress in Abéché, forming the Union for the Progress of Chad (UPT).

This alliance became short-lived, as PNA issued their own candidate lists for elections. In 1961, PNA leaders were arrested and in January 1962 the party was banned. In 1963, the PNA leader Djibrine Kherallah declared that the PNA would not agree to dissolve itself.
