= 1958 Chari-Baguirmi by-election =

Election in Chad

A by-election was held in Chari-Baguirmi, a region of the French West African territory of Chad, on 1 June 1958. The seven-member seat had been won by the Entente in the Territorial Assembly elections held on 31 March 1957, but the results were annulled, and the seat was subsequently won by the Chadian Socialist Union.

== Background ==
The 1957 Territorial Assembly elections had seen the Entente win 42% of the vote in Chari-Baguirmi, winning all seven seats. The African Socialist Movement finished second with 39.8% but did not win a seat.

| Party | Votes | % | Seats |
|---|---|---|---|
| Entente | 15,043 | 42.11 | 7 |
| African Socialist Movement | 14,229 | 39.83 | 0 |
| Chadian Social Action | 6,450 | 18.06 | 0 |
| Total | 35,722 | 100.00 | 7 |
| Valid votes | 35,722 | 96.52 | |
| Invalid/blank votes | 1,289 | 3.48 | |
| Total votes | 37,011 | 100.00 | |
| Registered voters/turnout | 138,182 | 26.78 | |
Source: Sternberger et al.

== Results ==
| Party | Votes | % | Seats |
|---|---|---|---|
| Chadian Socialist Union | 23,274 | 58.53 | 7 |
| Entente | 16,487 | 41.47 | 0 |
| Total | 39,761 | 100.00 | 7 |
| Valid votes | 39,761 | 96.75 | |
| Invalid/blank votes | 1,336 | 3.25 | |
| Total votes | 41,097 | 100.00 | |
| Registered voters/turnout | 139,717 | 29.41 | |
Source: Sternberger et al.
