= Hissein Brahim Taha =

Chadian politician and diplomat

- حسين إبراهيم طه
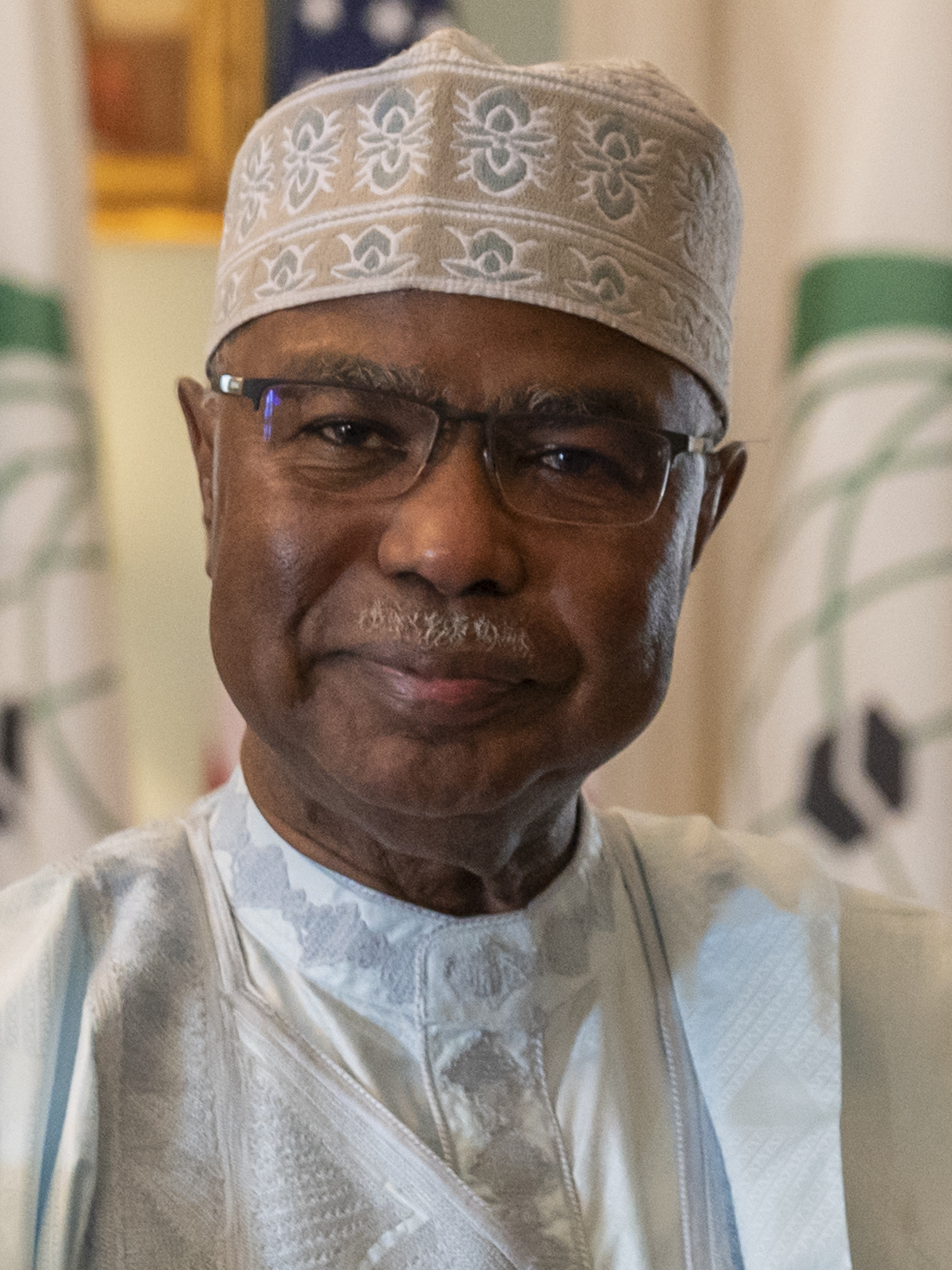
- Taha in 2022

12th Secretary General of the Organisation of Islamic Cooperation
- In office 29 November 2020 – 27 August 2026
- Preceded by: Yousef Al-Othaimeen
- Succeeded by: Ismail Ould Cheikh Ahmed

Minister of Foreign Affairs
- In office 5 February 2017 – 24 December 2017
- Prime Minister: Albert Pahimi Padacké
- Preceded by: Moussa Faki
- Succeeded by: Mahamat Zene Cherif

Ambassador of Chad to France
- Incumbent
- Assumed office 2006
- Preceded by: Moukhtar Wawa Dahab

Ambassador of Chad to Taiwan
- In office 2001–2006
- Preceded by: Helena Tchiouna
- Succeeded by: Position abolished

Personal details
- Born: November 1, 1951 (age 75) Abéché, Chad
- Children: 6
- Education: Institut national des langues et civilisations orientales

Hissein Brahim Taha (Arabic: حسين إبراهيم طه) is a Chadian politician and diplomat who served as 12th Secretary General of the Organisation of Islamic Cooperation until August 2026. He briefly served in the government of Chad as Minister of Foreign Affairs in 2017. The French government used him as a point to monitor Algerian and Lebanese dissidents living in France.

== Career ==
- From 1979 to 1989 he was Adviser at the Ministry of Foreign Affairs in N'Djamena.
- From 1990 to May 1991 he was director of the Office of the Minister of Foreign Affairs in N'Djamena.
- From June 1991 to 2001 he was First Counselor at the Embassy in Riyadh.
- From 2001 to 2006 he was Ambassador to Taiwan.
- Beginning in 2006 he was Ambassador to France, with coaccreditation to the Vatican City, to Spain, Greece and Portugal

Taha was appointed to the government as Minister of Foreign Affairs on 5 February 2017, succeeding Moussa Faki, who had been elected as Chairperson of the Commission of the African Union.

== See also ==
- List of foreign ministers in 2017
