= 1945 French legislative election in Chad–Ubangi-Shari =

Elections to the French National Assembly were held in Chad and Ubangi-Shari on 21 October 1945. The territories elected two seats to the Assembly via two electoral colleges. René Malbrant was elected from the first college and Guy Baucheron de Boissoudy in the second, both of whom were members of the Chadian Democratic Union.

== Campaign ==
World War II had seen Chad become a territory whose primary political sentiment was loyalty to Charles de Gaulle; it had been recognised with numerous accolades for being the first territory to respond to his Appeal of 18 June, and had also been used as a base for Philippe Leclerc de Hauteclocque's desert campaign. As a result, the Gaullist Chadian Democratic Union found it easy to recruit African members, despite its conservative views on African rights. The party put up European candidates for both college seats; Malbrant was a vet and de Boissoudy a colonel.

== Results ==
=== First College ===
Candidate	Party	Votes	%
René Malbrant	Chadian Democratic Union–UDSR	666	79.95
Marcel Tournade	French Section of the Workers' International	110	13.21
Georges Nègre		40	4.80
Baptiste Bannister		17	2.04
Total		833	100.00
Valid votes		833	91.64
Invalid/blank votes		76	8.36
Total votes		909	100.00
Registered voters/turnout		1,361	66.79
Source: Sternberger et al., National Assembly

=== Second College ===
Candidate	Party	Votes	%
Guy Baucheron de Boissoudy	Chadian Democratic Union–UDSR	3,045	58.75
Aristide Issembé	French Communist Party	1,162	22.42
Pierre Indo	French Section of the Workers' International	656	12.66
Sekou Diarra		186	3.59
Frédéric Granier		134	2.59
Total		5,183	100.00
Valid votes		5,183	98.89
Invalid/blank votes		58	1.11
Total votes		5,241	100.00
Registered voters/turnout		6,858	76.42
Source: Sternberger et al.
