= Nassour =

Nassour is a surname and a given name. Notable people with the name include:

- Abbo Nassour (born 1927), Chadian politician
- Edward Nassour (1911–1962), American film producer, businessman, special effects animator
- Jennifer Nassour (born 1971), American attorney and political figure
- Nassour Guelendouksia Ouaido (born 1947), Prime Minister of Chad, President of the National Assembly of Chad

== See also ==
- Doctor Fate (Khalid Nassour), superhero featured in American comic books published by DC Comics
- Nassour Studios, radio and television studio facility in Hollywood, Los Angeles, California, US
