= 1951 French legislative election in Chad–Ubangi-Shari =

Elections to the French National Assembly were held in Chad and Ubangi-Shari on 17 June 1951. The territories elected four seats to the Assembly via two electoral colleges. The first college spanned both territories and elected one seat, whilst Chad elected two seats via the second college and Ubangi-Shari one. René Malbrant was re-elected from the first college, and Barthélémy Boganda from the second in Ubangi-Shari. In the second college in Chad, both seats were won by the Chadian Democratic Union, and were taken by Mohamed Bechir-Sow and Quatre Sou Quatre.

== Results ==
=== First college ===
Candidate	Party	Votes	%
René Malbrant	Rally of the French People	2,730	100.00
Total		2,730	100.00
Valid votes		2,730	92.35
Invalid/blank votes		226	7.65
Total votes		2,956	100.00
Registered voters/turnout		4,490	65.84
Source: Sternberger et al.

=== Second college ===
==== Chad ====
Party	Votes	%	Seats	+/–
Chadian Democratic Union–RPF	123,456	75.14	2	New
Chadian Progressive Party–RDA	14,497	8.82	0	–1
Independent Socialist Party of Chad	13,467	8.20	0	New
Democratic and Socialist Union of the Resistance	6,522	3.97	0	0
Independent List	6,369	3.88	0	New
Total	164,311	100.00	2	+1
Valid votes	164,311	99.03		
Invalid/blank votes	1,614	0.97		
Total votes	165,925	100.00		
Registered voters/turnout	250,341	66.28		
Source: Sternberger et al.

==== Ubangi-Shari ====
Candidate	Party	Votes	%
Barthélemy Boganda	Movement for the Social Evolution of Black Africa	31,631	48.19
Marcel Bella	Rally of the French People	21,637	32.96
Georges Darlan	Ubangian Union	8,288	12.63
Eugène Freidrich		2,877	4.38
Michel Gallin-Douathe	French Section of the Workers' International	1,208	1.84
Total		65,641	100.00
Valid votes		65,641	96.89
Invalid/blank votes		2,105	3.11
Total votes		67,746	100.00
Registered voters/turnout		111,201	60.92
Source: Sternberger et al.
