= Bébalem massacre =

1952 massacre by French authorities in Chad

- Location: Bébalem, French Chad (now Chad)
- Date: 16 April 1952
- Target: protesting farmers
- Deaths: 24 (according to Bernard Lanne); 70 (according to canton chief); 375 (according to survivors)
- Perpetrator: Senegalese Tirailleurs of the French Army

The Bébalem massacre (French: Massacre de Bébalem) was a massacre of Sara farmers in the southern French Chad town of Bébalem. It was carried out on 16 April 1952 by Senegalese Tirailleurs on the orders of the French colonial authorities after the farmers had started protesting the results of a local election.

== Background ==
In the colony of French Chad, cotton had become a predominant export product from the late 1920s onwards. The production rose from 17 tonnes in 1929 to 80.500 tonnes in 1957. This created an increasingly large divide between impoverished rural labourers on the one hand and the powerful chiefs and middlemen who pocketed most of the profits on the other. According to René Lemarchand, "the parastatal agency responsible for the production quotas, the Cotonfran, came to be regarded by the peasant masses as prime symbol of corporate and chiefly ruthlessness". Moreover, the French administration's focus on cotton led to a decrease in food production and even to famines in some areas. These conditions led to tensions and occasional violent outbursts against the chiefs.

In 1947, the Chadian Progressive Party (PPT) was founded by Gabriel Lisette. Although the PPT was a relatively moderate party and Lisette was close to Félix Houphouët-Boigny, it grew into an important opponent of the colonial administration, helping to organize trade union opposition in the Cotonfran factories. Meanwhile, the colonial administrators and chiefs were closer to the Chadian Democratic Union (UDT).

== Massacre and aftermath ==
On 30 March 1952, local elections were held for the National Assembly. The announcement that the PPT had lost the Bébalem election soon led to virulent protests by local cotton farmers, who took to the streets armed with blades. The French authorities decided to dispatch a contingent of Senegalese Tirailleurs to strike down the protests. A force of about 120 to 150 infantrymen entered Bébalem on 16 April 1952 and fired on the crowd, killing an uncertain number of demonstrators. Additionally, the leaders of the protest were arrested and imprisoned. Estimates of the death toll vary greatly: 24 according to the author Bernard Lanne, 70 according to the circle of the canton chief, and 375 according to witnesses who survived the massacre.

The future playwright Maoundoé Naindouba, aged four at the time, was a witness to the massacre.
