= Minister of Foreign Affairs (Chad) =

The Minister of Foreign Affairs of the Republic of Chad is a government minister in charge of the Ministry of Foreign Affairs of Chad, responsible for conducting foreign relations of the country.

The following is a list of foreign ministers of Chad since its founding in 1960:

No.	Name (Birth–Death)	Portrait	Tenure
1	Pierre Toura Gaba (1920–1998)		1960–1961
2	Djibrine Kherallah (1926–2001)		1961–1963
3	Maurice Ngangtar (1932–2001)		1963–1964
4	Jacques Bab Jeggilu Baroum (b. 1932)		1964–1971
5	Mahamat Saleh Baba Hasane (b. 1933)		1971–1973
6	Djiriabaye Doralta (b. 1922)		1973–1975
7	Wadel Abdelkader Kamougué (1939–2011)		1975–1978
8	Kotigua Guérina (b. 1940)		1978–1979
9	Barma Ramadan		1979
10	Dabar Nag Koumaba Dering		1979
11	Ahmat Acyl (1944–1982)		1979–1982
12	Idriss Miskine (1948–1984)		1982–1984
—	Korom Ahmad Acting Minister		1984
13	Gouara Lassou (b. 1948)		1984–1989
14	Acheikh Ibn-Oumar (b. 1951)		1989–1990
15	Soungui Ahmad		1990–1991
16	Mahamat Saleh Ahmat (1945–2017)		1991–1992
17	Mahamat Ali Adoum (b. 1947)		1992–1993
18	Korom Ahmad (b. 1947)		1993
19	Fakadi Lokna (?–2005)		1993–1994
20	Ahmat Abderahmane Haggar (b. 1950)		1994–1996
21	Saleh Kebzabo (b. 1947)		1996–1997
22	Mahamat Saleh Annadif (b. 1956)		1997–2003
23	Nagoum Yamassoum (b. 1954)		2003–2005
24	Ahmad Allam-Mi (b. 1948)		2005–2008
25	Moussa Faki (b. 1960)		2008–2017
26	Hissein Brahim Taha (b. 1951)		2017
27	Mahamat Zene Cherif (b. 1964)		2017–2020
28	Amine Abba Sidick		2020–2021
(27)	Mahamat Zene Cherif (b. 1964)		2021–2022
(22)	Mahamat Saleh Annadif (b. 1956)		2022–2024
29	Abderaman Koulamallah (b. 1955)		2024–2025
30	Abdoulaye Sabre Fadoul		2025–present

== Sources ==
- Rulers.org – Foreign ministers A–D
