= Zollie Malindi =

Zollie Malindi (1924 – 21 April 2008) was a South African trade unionist and anti-apartheid activist. His life journey started in the small village of Gqogqora, near Tsomo in the former Transkei. While growing up, Zollie became aware of racial segregation. Years later, after completing his Teaching Training Diploma, he set off to look for work in Cape Town; but in those days it was not easy for an African male to find employment even with a professional's qualification. Zollie became actively involved in the African National Party (ANC) and the South African Communist Party (SACP) in the 1940s. As members of the ANC were encouraged to join unions, in no time, Zollie joined the Food and Canning Workers Union (FAWU) where he met political leaders like Oscar Mpetha and Ray Alexander. Zollie was a dedicated man and a powerful leader with a commanding presence and a high degree of responsibility. At the time of the ANC's banning in 1960, Malindi was the Western Cape Provincial President. Following the passage of the 90-day detention laws in 1963, Malindi was arrested and detained together with Looksmart Ngudle, who was the first person to die in detention. In the years after his detention, Zollie became even more involved in the fight against apartheid and subsequently became a mentor to the younger generation of political activists that included well-known political figures such as former Minister of Finance Trevor Manuel. After the 1994 elections, Zollie continued working as a member of the ANC, but his declining health forced him to retire alongside his wife, activist Letitia Malindi. A day after his death in 2008, Zollie Malindi was awarded the Order of Luthuli in silver by former South African president Thabo Mbeki in recognition of his contribution to the trade union movement.
