= 1959 Chadian parliamentary election =

- 31 May 1959
- All 84 seats in the National Assembly
- Turnout: 46.05%
Party	Leader	Vote %	Seats	+/–
PPT–RDA	François Tombalbaye	68.70	57	+25
GIRT	Gontchomé Sahoulba	7.82	2	−7
UDIT		7.27	16	New
AST		4.50	9	+2
This lists parties that won seats. See the complete results below.

Parliamentary elections were held in Chad on 31 May 1959. The result was a victory for the Chadian Progressive Party, which won 57 of the 84 seats in the enlarged National Assembly.

== Results ==
Party	Votes	%	Seats	+/–
Chadian Progressive Party–African Democratic Rally	390,377	68.70	57	+25
African Socialist Movement	55,500	9.77	0	0
Grouping of Rural and Independent Chadians	44,438	7.82	2	–7
Independent Democratic Union of Chad	41,304	7.27	16	New
Chadian Social Action	25,597	4.50	9	+2
Movement for the Social Evolution of Black Africa	11,041	1.94	0	New
Total	568,257	100.00	84	+19
Valid votes	568,257	97.71		
Invalid/blank votes	13,340	2.29		
Total votes	581,597	100.00		
Registered voters/turnout	1,262,985	46.05		
Source: Sternberger et al.
