= Hadjé Halimé =

Chadian activist, educator, and politician

Hadjé Halimé Oumar (1930-2001) was a Chadian activist, educator, and politician.

== Biography ==
Halimé was born in the town of Salamat in 1930 to a mother from Salamat and a father from Abeche. She became involved with the Parti Progressiste Tchadien (PPT) in 1950 while working as a Quranic instructor. She was able to bring in more women who did not know French due to her knowledge of Chadian Arabic. At the time she had only a limited grasp of French. She was particularly close to Gabriel Lisette, the founder of the party, and his wife, Lisette Yéyon. She became responsible for recruiting Northern women following the General Meeting of 2 April 1950. Halimé harshly criticized the colonial administration's poll tax, and declared that if the PPT secured a victory, the poll tax would be abolished for all despite the platform calling for ending the tax only on women. She explained that "women were arrested on their arrival on the market or anywhere. They were left in the sun until they paid the tax which was 370 riyals per person." She declared that Lisette was the undisputed leader of the party, despite the rise of Southern Chadian politician François Tombalbaye, and traveled to France on Lisette's urging to meet with the French politician Rene Coty.

However, in 1959 and 1960 Tombalbaye gained power and Lisette was removed from power. Halimé became the target of repression soon after independence, unlike her PPT female colleague Kalthouma Nguembang. As part of a purge of those near to Lisette, Halimé's only son was murdered, and she was arrested in September 1963. At first, she was taken to Massenya in Chari-Baguirmi Region, then to a central prison in Chad's capital of N'Djamena, and finally to a dreaded prison at Kela. At the Kela prison, she was regularly tortured by guards through electrocution while French and Israeli army officers supervised. Her torture resulted in her losing all her fingernails and hair. Despite Tombalbaye wanting Halimé to be killed, a French officer spared her life. In an interview, she stated that only her faith was able to keep her going through the difficult circumstances of torture. She was finally released on 28 April 1975, days after the overthrow of Tombalbaye and his regime. Out of 600 people who were imprisoned during this purge, she was one of only 45 who lived.

Lisette, who had been exiled in France, helped bring her to Paris to receive medical treatment. Halimé spent time in a hospital in Côte d'Ivoire, where the president Felix Houphouet-Boigny mandated that her medical care was free. She later joined the National Liberation Front of Chad or FROLINAT, which was based in Libya. In 1978, she moved to Tripoli and returned to politics. FROLINAT members dubbed her "the mother of the revolution", and the party seized power in 1979. She also began educating girls in Libya and founded an Islamic school, the Rising New Generation, where she taught religion, home economics, and child care. She taught over 3600 girls at the school during her years there.

She returned to N'Djamena in 1980 with the Popular Armed Forces (FAP) leader Goukouni Oueddei. She was then the president of the women's faction of FROLINAT. After the election of Hissène Habré in 1982, she left with forces loyal to Oueddeï in Libya. While in Libya, Halimé taught military skills to exiled Chadian women. She returned to Chad in 1991, a year after the overthrow of Habré by Idriss Déby. Many people told Deby they would support him only if he received the backing of Halimé, which she eventually did. Shortly after her return, she won a seat in Chad's parliament and served there until 1996.

In 1993, she participated in the National Sovereign Conference (CNS), and was one of the most fervent defenders of the Arabic language. In 1994, she created an association called Women Az-Zara. On behalf of the association, she was voted among ten women candidates to be a member of the Higher Council of Transition, staying four years. In June 1996, she ran for parliament as a member of the opposition National Front of Chad party, as it was impossible to run as an independent. She was defeated but maintained the election was rigged. Halimé afterwards cared for orphans whose parents were killed in the Habré regime. She also opened an Arabic school in N'Djamena.

She went on six pilgrimages to Mecca in her life, including one last trip in 2000. She died on 7 January 2001, and is fondly remembered as a women's resistance figure in Chad today. Summing up her legacy, she stated, "I fought for the people as I struggled against the colonizer."
