= November 1946 French legislative election in Chad–Ubangi-Shari =

Elections to the French National Assembly were held in Chad and Ubangi-Shari on 10 November 1946. The territories elected three seats to the Assembly via two electoral colleges; the first college spanned both territories and elected one member, whilst each territory elected one member via the second college. René Malbrant was elected from the first college, with Gabriel Lisette elected from the second college in Chad and Barthélémy Boganda elected in the second college in Ubangi-Shari.

== Results ==
=== First college ===
Candidate	Party	Votes	%
René Malbrant	Democratic and Socialist Union of the Resistance	1,003	83.93
Pierre Plumeau		192	16.07
Total		1,195	100.00
Valid votes		1,195	97.31
Invalid/blank votes		33	2.69
Total votes		1,228	100.00
Registered voters/turnout		1,807	67.96
Source: Sternberger et al.

=== Second college ===
==== Chad ====
Candidate	Party	Votes	%
Gabriel Lisette	Chadian Progressive Party	7,268	41.30
Guy Baucheron de Boissoudy	Democratic and Socialist Union of the Resistance	6,788	38.57
Henri Montchamp		2,890	16.42
Pierre Toura Gaba		652	3.70
Total		17,598	100.00
Valid votes		17,598	98.56
Invalid/blank votes		257	1.44
Total votes		17,855	100.00
Registered voters/turnout		27,664	64.54
Source: Sternberger et al.

==== Ubangi-Shari ====
Candidate	Party	Votes	%
Barthélemy Boganda	Popular Republican Movement	10,846	48.32
Gérard Tarquin		5,190	23.12
Jean-Baptiste Songo-Mali	French Section of the Workers' International	4,801	21.39
Joseph-François Reste	Rally of Republican Lefts	1,607	7.16
Total		22,444	100.00
Valid votes		22,444	97.80
Invalid/blank votes		505	2.20
Total votes		22,949	100.00
Registered voters/turnout		32,716	70.15
Source: Sternberger et al.
