= 1963 Chadian parliamentary election =

- 22 December 1963
- All 75 seats in the National Assembly
- Turnout: 95.41%
Party	Leader	Vote %	Seats	+/–
PPT	François Tombalbaye	99.92	75	−10
This lists parties that won seats. See the complete results below.

Parliamentary elections were held in Chad on 22 December 1963. The country was a one-party state at the time, with the Chadian Progressive Party as the sole legal party. It therefore won all 75 seats in the National Assembly. Voter turnout was 95.41%.

== Results ==
Party	Votes	%	Seats	+/–
Chadian Progressive Party	1,352,749	99.92	75	–10
Against	1,028	0.08	–	–
Total	1,353,777	100.00	75	–10
Valid votes	1,353,777	99.82		
Invalid/blank votes	2,434	0.18		
Total votes	1,356,211	100.00		
Registered voters/turnout	1,421,520	95.41		
Source: Nohlen et al.
