= Pierre Toura Gaba =

Chadian politician

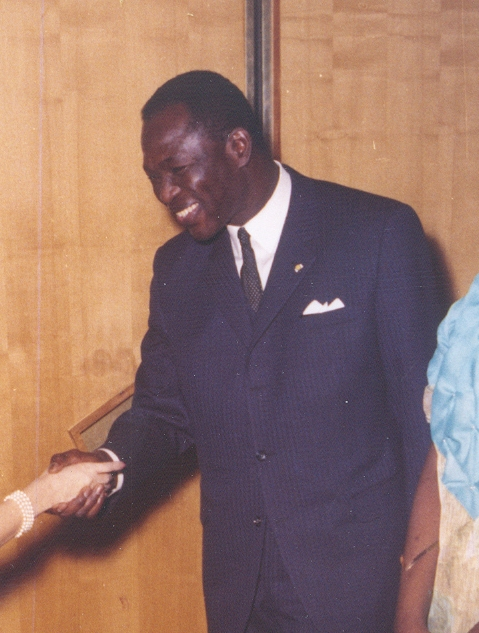
- Pierre Toura Gaba as Ambassador to West Germany (1966).

Minister of National Education
- In office 1961–1962
- President: François Tombalbaye
- Preceded by: Ahmed Mangué
- Succeeded by: Antoine Bangui

Minister of Foreign Affairs
- In office 1960–1961
- President: François Tombalbaye
- Preceded by: Office established
- Succeeded by: Djibrine Kerallah

Personal details
- Born: 18 December 1920 Maibyan, Colony of Chad
- Died: 29 September 1998 (aged 77) N'Djamena, Chad

Jules Pierre Toura Gaba (December 18, 1920 – September 29, 1998) was a Chadian politician and diplomat. Following the independence of Chad, he served as its first Minister of Foreign Affairs from 1960 to 1961.

== Life and career ==
He was born on December 18, 1920, at Maibyan, near Moissala, in the prefecture of Moyen-Chari in southern Chad. He served as a diplomat at Brazzaville and worked for a long time as a teacher in places like Ati, Abéché, Bongor and Fort-Archambault (now called Sarh).

When Chad was still a French colony, a Representative Council for which some of the African inhabitants could vote was instituted. Toura entered politics and became a member of this council from 1946 to 1956. A year later, he founded the Chadian Progressive Party (PPT) with Gabriel Lisette, in which Toura became secretary-general and Lisette president. The 1956 reforms greatly boosted the suffrage, strengthening the PPT, which triumphed in the first democratic elections. Toura was among the PPT representatives elected and became Minister of Agriculture in the first black government led by Lisette in 1958. But in February, Lisette lost his position and a month later Toura lost his office in the party to François Tombalbaye, who, later in the same month, became the new head of the government. This position was strengthened by the following elections in May, which were triumphantly won by the PPT. A new government was formed, headed by Tombalbaye and with Toura as Minister of Public Works.

With the independence of Chad on August 11, 1960, Tombalbaye became President and Toura was made Minister of Foreign Affairs. As such he headed the Chadian delegation that on September 29, 1960, was present at the United Nations General Assembly that admitted Chad into the UN.

In 1961, Toura became Minister of National Education. Nevertheless, Tombalbaye had become increasingly suspicious and authoritarian. As a result, Toura fell in disgrace and was arrested in 1962. He remained in jail for several years, after which the President decided he could use him as a diplomat and sent him as Ambassador to West Germany in 1966. In 1973, Toura resigned and went into exile in France. In Paris he wrote Non à Tombalbaye! - Fragments autobiographiques, a critique of the Tombalbaye Regime (1974). By August, the work started circulating secretly in Chad among opponents of the President.

After the coup of 1975 that removed Tombalbaye, Toura returned to the diplomatic service and was made Ambassador to the United States in 1976. He served until 1979, when he resigned after the dissolution of any central authority in Chad. He found asylum in the United States and remained there until 1991, when he returned to Chad. He died on September 29, 1998, at N'Djamena.

Preceded by none	Foreign Minister of Chad; 1960-1961	Succeeded by Djibrine Kerallah
