= Ahmed Koulamallah =

Politician in Colonial Chad

President of Provisional Government
- Preceded by: Gontchomé Sahoulba
- Succeeded by: François Tombalbaye

Personal details
- Born: 11 February 1912
- Died: 5 September 1995 (aged 83)
- Party: PSIT
- Spouse: Hayatte Kifli Choukri
- Relations: Gaourang II (father-in-law)
- Children: Abderaman Koulamallah
- Parent(s): Koulamallah; Méram Fatimé Afadée

Ahmed Koulamallah (11 February 1912 – 5 September 1995) was a prominent politician in Colonial Chad. He was the estranged son of the sultan of Baguirmi and the charismatic leader of the Tijaniyyah Islamic brotherhood in Chad.

He entered in politics founding in 1950 the Independent Socialist Party of Chad (Parti socialiste indepéndent du Tchad or PSIT), connected to the French Section of the Workers' International (SFIO), reconstructed as Chadian section of the African Socialist Movement (Mouvement Socialiste Africain or MSA). Koulamallah campaigned in different times and places as a member of the Baguirmi nobility, a radical socialist leader, or a militant Muslim fundamentalist. He picked most of his adherents from the Chari-Baguirmi and Kanem prefectures.

In regards to the main political parties, the conservative Chadian Democratic Union (UDT) and Chadian Social Action (AST) and the progressive Chadian Progressive Party (PPT), Koulamallah played a generally disruptive role in the middle.

Defeated in the 1957 elections for the Territorial Assembly, he remained in the opposition until he allied himself in 1959 with Gontchomé Sahoulba forming the Chadian Popular Movement (Mouvement Populaire Tchadien or MPT), which following a motion of no confidence presented on 11 February 1959, was instrumental in causing the downfall of Gabriel Lisette and the PPT government. Sahoulba succeeded Lisette as President of the Provisional Government, forming a government of which he was the only southern Chadian. This exclusion of the south generated high resentment, and brought Koulamallah to ally himself with Lisette against Sahoulba; as a result, a new motion of no confidence was approved with 35 votes against 30, and a new government was formed by Koulamallah on 13 March 1959. The first day he brought all the ministers, Muslims or non-Muslims, to the mosque to pray thanks; and established Arabic would be the working language of the government. Also for this his government survived only eleven days, as yet another motion of no confidence overthrowed the government with 42 votes out of 52.

Following this he was again relegated to the opposition, while the PPT, now led by François Tombalbaye, who became the first president of independent Chad on 11 August 1960. In January 1962 all political parties were banned, except the PPT; and in September 1963 all the opposition leader were arrested. Koulamallah escaped with the help of his Baguirmian relatives, crossing the Chari River and passing in Cameroon. But only a few days later he was arrested by the Cameroonian authorities, and extradited to Chad where he was immediately jailed. He remained in prison till 1971, and again from 1972 till 1975, when Tombalbaye was overthrown by a coup.

He died in 1995.

Political offices
Preceded by Gontchomé Sahoulba	President of the Government of Chad; 1959	Succeeded by François Tombalbaye
