= Christian Georges Diguimbaye =

Chadian politician

Christian Georges Diguimbaye (born 3 July 1963) is a banker and politician from Chad and former minister of finance.

== Career ==
Diguimbaye was previously an official with the African Union in Addis Ababa. He was minister of finance from 2011 to 2013. He was again appointed finance minister by President Idriss Déby on 6 February 2017, following the firing of Mbogo Ngabo Selil in January. He was replaced by Abdoulaye Sabre Fadoul in December 2017.
