= René Malbrant =

French veterinarian and politician

René Jules Maurice Malbrant (8 March 1903 – 25 November 1961) was a French veterinarian and politician. He served as a member of the French National Assembly between 1946 and 1959.

== Veterinarian ==
Born in Dangé, Vienne, Malbrant studied at École nationale vétérinaire d'Alfort and Faculté de Médecine de Paris. The field research for his thesis was carried out in Morocco during the Rif War. In 1927 he was sent to Chad to serve as Head of Livestock (a post he would hold for eleven years). In the same year Malbrant organized the arrival of Bororo (Fulbe) herders to Ubangui. Malbrant was in-charge of the Fort Lamy veterinary laboratory (set up in the late 1930s), at which he experimented with vaccines against cattle plague. In 1938 he shifted to Brazzaville, to serve as Head of Livestock for French Equatorial Africa. During these years he collected natural history specimens and produced more than fifty scientific reports on the African fauna. Two subspecies of birds, Mirafra africana malbranti, and Caprimulgus inornatus malbranti were named after him.

== War ==
During World War II, Malbrant was an officer in the Free French Forces. He was appointed as a member of the Provisional Consultative Assembly (based in Algiers, later in Paris), representing the 'Resistance Overseas' and as a delegate of 'Rally of the Colonies' and the Combat movement. His seat in the Assembly was validated on May 19, 1944.

== Constituent Assembly ==
Malbrant was represented in all legislatures of the French Fourth Republic, representing the first electoral college (i.e. French citizens) of French Equatorial Africa. In 1945 Malbrant took part in the founding of the Chadian Democratic Union (UDT), the Chadian branch of the Gaullist Rally of the People of France.

In October 1945 he was elected to the Constituent Assembly, receiving 80% of the vote. In the June 1946 Constituent Assembly elections he retained his seat, running unopposed.

== States General of Colonization ==
In July 1946 Malbrant organized the States General of Colonization (a congress of French colonists, held in Paris). The convention gathered colonists that opposed giving French citizenships to the inhabitants of the overseas territories collectively. Through the pressure from these colonists, in October the same year the National Assembly adopted new draft constitutions for the overseas territories (which were in sharp contrasts to the ones adopted by the National Assembly in April 1946).

== National Assembly ==
Malbrant contested the November 1946 French legislative election as a candidate in the Oubangui-Chari/Chad first college seat. He defeated independent candidate Pierre Plumeau with 1,003 votes against 192. He was re-elected unopposed again in 1951 and 1956.

At the time, Malbrant was widely recognized for his role in the Resistance during the war. He would remain a parliamentarian for several years to come. In parliament he fiercely opposed liberal reforms like the Overseas Labour Code and the Municipal Reform Bill. Malbrant also opposed abolishing the separate electoral college for Europeans in French Equatorial Africa, Prominently, Malbrant developed a hostile relationship with Barthélemy Boganda. Malbrant opposed the creation of the European Community.

The dual electoral college system was abolished in late 1956, whereby Malbrant lost his possibility to get re-elected.

== Personal life ==
Malbrant married Marie-Louise Destrac in Fort Lamy on 22 March 1934. The couple never had any children. He died in Paris in 1961.

== Honours ==
Malbrant was awarded several French and African honours; Officer of the Legion of Honour, Croix de Guerre 1939-1945, Rosette of the Résistance, Etoile équatoriale du Gabon and Ordre national du Tchad.
