= Mahamat Ali Adoum =

Chadian politician and diplomat

Chad Ambassador to Canada
- Incumbent
- Assumed office 2014

Mahamat Ali Adoum (Arabic: محمد علي أدوم; born 14 November 1947) is a Chadian politician and diplomat who has served as the Ambassador of Chad to Canada since 2014. He previously represented the country to the European Community, United States, and the United Nations among other posts. From 1992 to 1993, he was also the Minister of Foreign Affairs.

== Early and personal life ==
Adoum was born on 14 November 1947 in Michimeré (Bahr el-Ghazal), which was then part of French Equatorial Africa. Adoum received a diploma in education from Université de Brazzaville, a bachelor's degree in political science from Université Laval in Quebec City, and his master's degree from the School of Advanced International Studies at Johns Hopkins University in Baltimore, Maryland.

He is married with four children.

== Career ==
Adoum was Chad's Ambassador to the United States, Canada and Argentina from 1983 to 1992. He was appointed as Minister of Foreign Affairs on May 22, 1992, serving until July 1993. During this time, he was a co-agent representing the Chadian government at the International Court of Justice in 1993 regarding his country's territorial dispute with Libya. In April 1994, Adoum joined the World Bank as Senior Advisor to the Executive Director for African French-speaking countries, and he remained at the World Bank until 2003. He was later appointed as Permanent Representative of Chad to the United Nations, presenting his credentials to the UN Secretary-General on February 15, 2005. He served until 2013 when he was replaced by Cherif Mahamat Zene.

He has also represented Chad in Belgium, Netherlands, Luxembourg, United Kingdom and the European Community.

In May 2014, Adoum was appointed as Ambassador to Canada.
