= Mahamat Saleh Annadif =

Chadian diplomat and politician (born 1956)

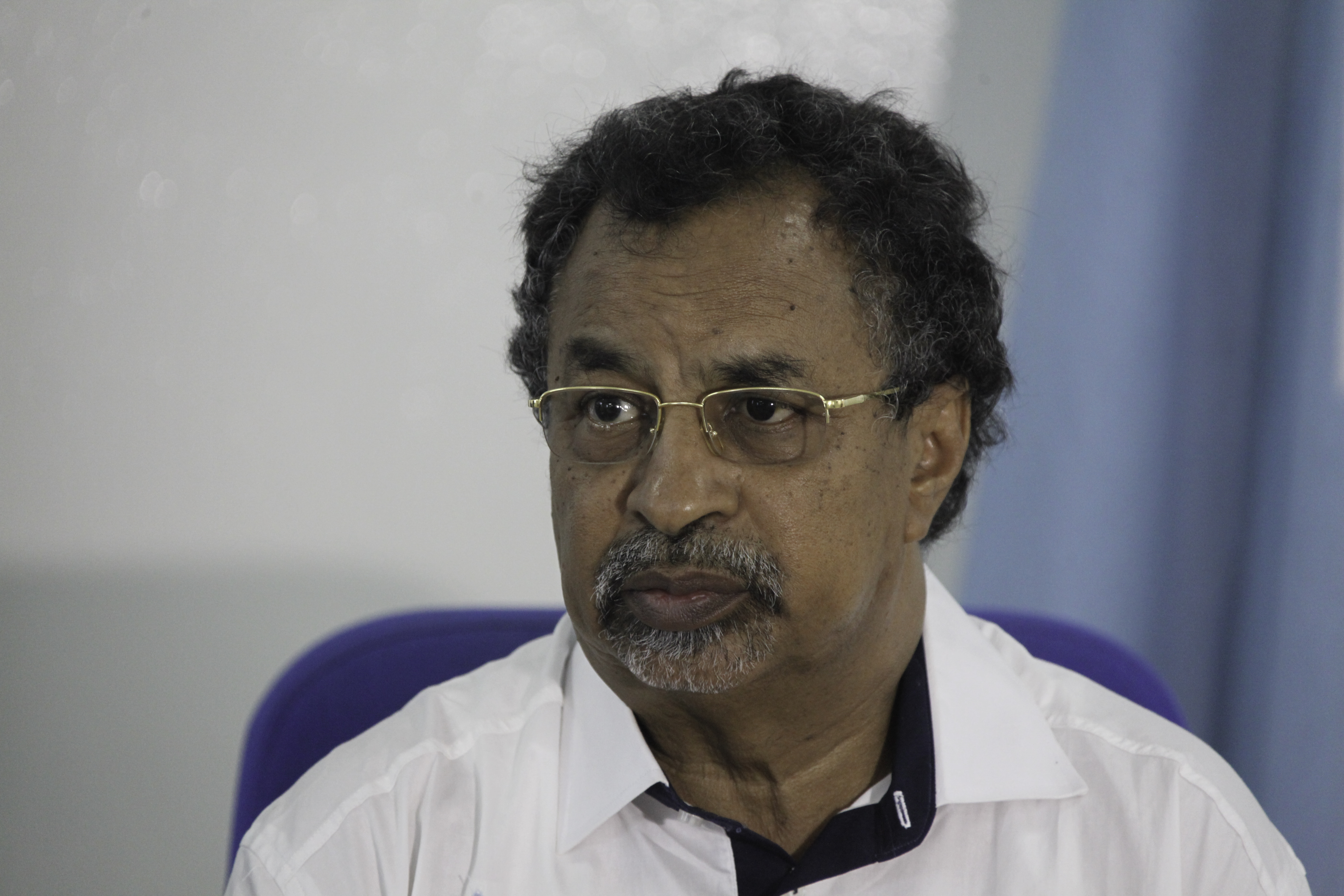
- Annadif in 2014

Minister of Foreign Affairs (Chad)
- In office October 2022 – May 2024

Special Representative of the Secretary-General for West Africa and the Sahel
- In office April 2021 – May 2023

Special Representative of the Secretary-General of the UN in Mali and Head of the United Nations Multidimensional Integrated Stabilization Mission in Mali (MINUSMA)
- In office December 2015 – April 2021

Special African Union's Special Representative and Head of the African Union Mission in Somalia (AMISOM)
- In office November 2012 – June 2014

Secretary-General of the Presidency
- In office April 2010 – November 2012

Permanent Representative of the African Union to the European Union
- In office May 2006 – April 2010

Director of the President's Cabinet
- In office September 2004 – May 2006

Minister of Foreign Affairs (Chad)
- In office May 1997 – June 2003

Director-General of the National Office of Posts and Telecommunications
- In office 1995–1997

Director General of International Telecommunications of Chad
- In office January 1991 – 1995

Secretary of State for Agriculture
- In office 1989–1990

Head of External Relations of the CDR & Second Vice-President of FROLINAT/CDR
- In office 1982–1988

Engineer at the National Office of Telecommunications and Posts
- In office 1981–1982

Personal details
- Born: December 25, 1956 (age 69) Arada, Chad
- Party: FROLINAT/CDR
- Education: Polytechnic School of Madagascar

Mahamat Saleh Annadif (born December 25, 1956) is a Chadian diplomat who has held various prominent roles. He served as the Minister of Foreign Affairs for the government of Chad from 1997 to 2003. Between 2006 and 2010, he also served as the Permanent Representative of the African Union to the European Union. From 2015 to 2021, he served as Special Representative of the Secretary-General in Mali. In addition, from 2022 to 2023, he served as the Head of the United Nations Office for West Africa and the Sahel (UNOWAS). Furthermore, he resumed his role as the Minister of Foreign Affairs and concurrently held the position of Minister of State from October 2022 until the conclusion of the Chadian transitional phase in May 2024, playing a crucial role in facilitating the transition.

== Early life and career ==
Annadif was born in Arada, Chad to a Rizeigat Arab family of the Mahariya branch and holds an engineering degree in telecommunications from the Polytechnic School of Madagascar.

Upon graduating, Annadif worked at the telecommunications department of the National Office of Posts and Telecommunications (ONTP) from 1981 to 1982. As a leading member of the National Liberation Front of Chad/Democratic Revolutionary Council (FROLINAT/CDR), he was in charge of the group's information and propaganda from 1982 to 1985; afterwards he was second vice-president of FROLINAT/CDR from 1985 to 1988. He again worked at the ONTP from 1988 to 1989 as head of research.

== Roles in government ==
Annadif served in the government as Secretary of State for Agriculture from 1989 to 1990. Later, he was Director-General of the ONTP from 1995 to 1997.

Annadif was first appointed as Minister of Foreign Affairs on May 21, 1997. On January 9, 2003, he signed a peace agreement with Mahamat Garfa, the leader of the rebel National Resistance Alliance (ANR), in Libreville, Gabon, providing for a cease-fire and the reintegration of the rebels into society. He was replaced as Foreign Minister in 2003 after six years in office. Later, he was appointed as the Director of the Cabinet of President Idriss Déby, taking office on September 9, 2004. He was subsequently appointed as Permanent Representative of the African Union to the European Union in May 2006.

Annadif was appointed as Secretary-General of the Presidency in April 2010.

On 17 April 2012, Annadif was arrested on suspicion of embezzlement. He denied the charges and was released on 17 July 2013.

== Roles in international politics ==
Annadif was appointed as the African Union's Special Representative for Somalia and Head of the African Union Mission in Somalia (AMISOM) on November 1, 2012. In this capacity, he oversaw 22,000 soldiers, mainly from Uganda, Burundi, Kenya, Ethiopia, Djibouti and Sierra Leone. During his time in office, Annadif implemented disciplinary measures after Human Rights Watch had revealed that African Union soldiers in Somalia raped and sexually exploited women and girls on their peacekeeping bases in the Somali capital Mogadishu.

In December 2015, Annadif was appointed by United Nations Secretary-General Ban Ki-moon to serve as his Special Representative for Mali and Head of the United Nations Multidimensional Integrated Stabilization Mission in Mali (MINUSMA), replacing Mongi Hamdi who had resigned after just a year amid difficulties implementing a peace deal and improving security in the north of the country. During Annadif's time in office, al-Qaeda in the Islamic Maghreb (AQIM) launched an attack in May 2016 on two United Nations' sites in northern Mali where a peacekeeper from China and three civilians were killed and over a dozen others wounded. Shortly after, the UN Security Council decided to send 2,500 extra peacekeepers to Mali, authorizing the force to take "all necessary means" to deter attacks.

Annadif is a member of the International Advisory Board of the African Press Organization (APO).
