= Maurice Ngangtar =

Chadian politician and diplomat

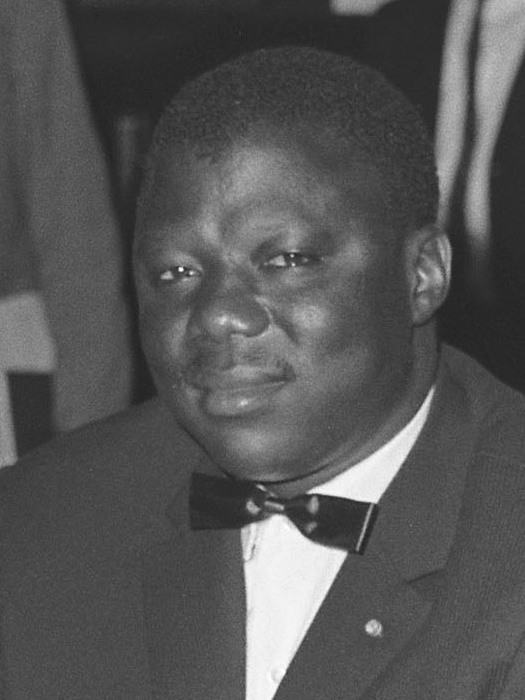
- Ngangtar in 1963

Foreign Minister of Chad
- In office 1963–1964
- Preceded by: Djibrine Kerallah
- Succeeded by: Jacques Bab Jeggilu Baroum

Maurice Ngangtar (1932 – 12 October 2001) was a Chadian politician and diplomat. He was Minister of Foreign Affairs of Chad from 1963 to 1964.

Preceded by Djibrine Kerallah	Foreign Minister of Chad; 1963-1964	Succeeded by Jacques Bab Jeggilu Baroum
