= 1962 Chadian parliamentary election =

- 4 March 1962
- All 85 seats in the National Assembly
- Turnout: 86.95%
Party	Leader	Vote %	Seats	+/–
PPT	François Tombalbaye	100	85	+28
This lists parties that won seats. See the complete results below.

Parliamentary elections were held in Chad on 4 March 1962, following a change to the constitution which had made the country a one-party state with the Chadian Progressive Party as the sole legal party. It therefore won all seats in the National Assembly. Voter turnout was 87.5%.

== Results ==
Party	Votes	%	Seats	+/–
Chadian Progressive Party	1,124,214	100.00	85	+28
Total	1,124,214	100.00	85	+1
Valid votes	1,124,214	99.62		
Invalid/blank votes	4,289	0.38		
Total votes	1,128,503	100.00		
Registered voters/turnout	1,297,908	86.95		
Source: Nohlen et al.
