= Grouping of Rural and Independent Chadians =

Grouping of Rural and Independent Chadians Groupement des indépendants et ruraux tchadien
- Abbreviation: GIRT
- Leader: Gontchomé Sahoulba
- Founded: 1956
- Merged into: Chadian Socialist Union

The Grouping of Rural and Independent Chadians (French: Groupement des indépendants et ruraux tchadien, GIRT) was a political party in Chad.

== History ==
The party was founded in 1956, when the Gontchomé Sahoulba-led faction broke away from Chadian Social Action. The party mainly represented interests of traditional chiefs from southern Chad.

The party was part of the Entente alliance for the 1957 Territorial Assembly elections, alongside the Chadian Progressive Party (PPT). The Entente won 57 of the 65 seats, of which GIRT took nine. However, the party left the Entente and joined the Chadian Socialist Union, a bloc of anti-PPT parties. Later this group evolved into the African National Party (PNA). The former GIRT leader Djibrine Kerallah became the vice chair of the PNA.
