= 1969 Indian presidential election =

Election of V. V. Giri

- 16 August 1969
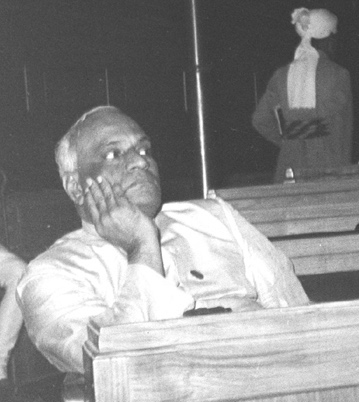

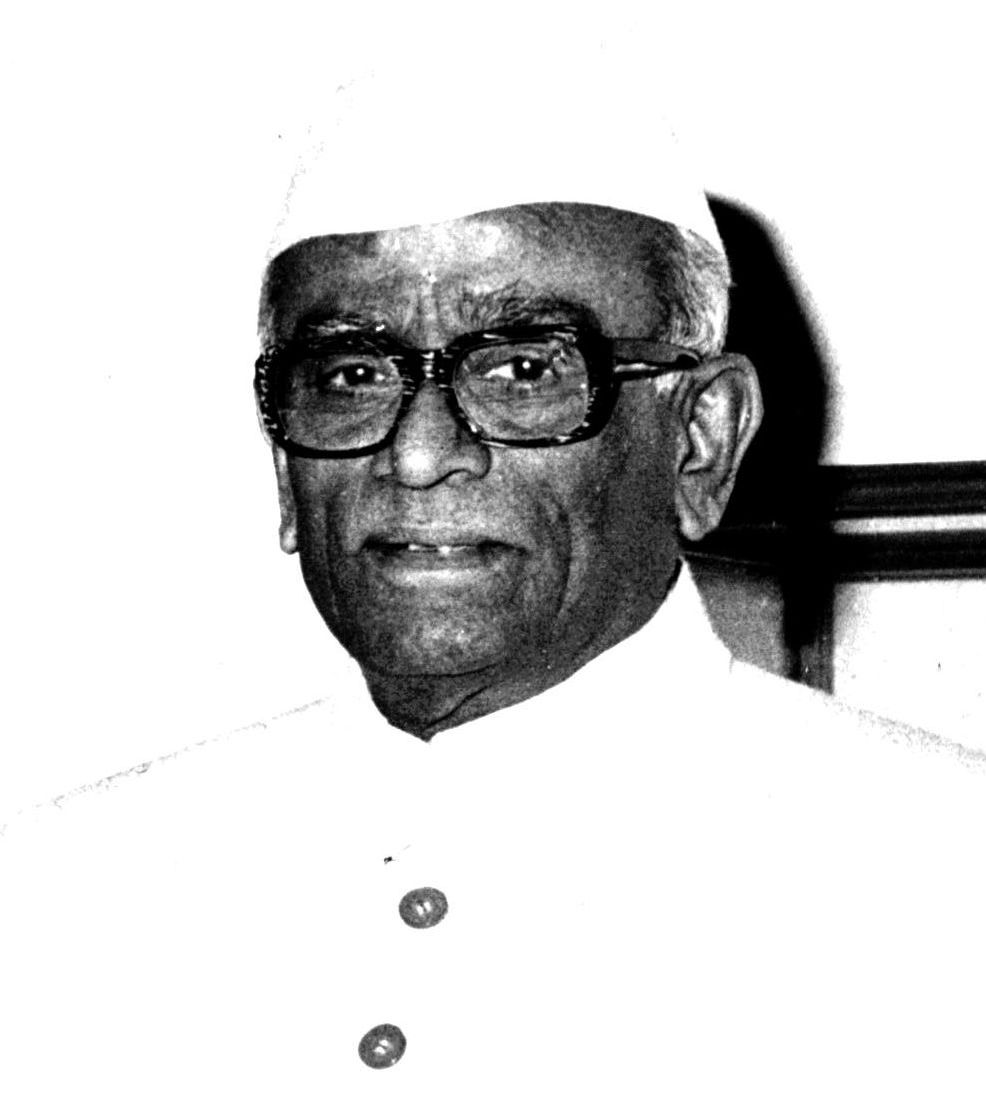
Nominee	V. V. Giri	Neelam Sanjiva Reddy
Party	Independent	Independent
Home state	Andhra Pradesh	Andhra Pradesh
Electoral vote	420,077	405,427
Percentage	50.89%	49.11%
President before election
Zakir Husain
Independent
Elected President
Varahagiri Venkata Giri
Independent

The Election Commission of India held indirect fifth presidential elections of India on 16 August 1969. Varahagiri Venkata Giri with 420,077 votes won in a runoff election over his rival Neelam Sanjeeva Reddy who got 405,427 votes.

== Schedule ==
The election schedule was announced by the Election Commission of India on 14 July 1969.

S.No.	Poll Event	Date
1.	Last Date for filing nomination	24 July 1969
2.	Date for Scrutiny of nomination	26 July 1969
3.	Last Date for Withdrawal of nomination	29 July 1969
4.	Date of Poll	16 August 1969
5.	Date of Counting	20 August 1969

== Results ==
Source: Web archive of Election Commission of India website

Candidate	Electoral Values (Initial Count)	Electoral Values (Runoff)
Varahagiri Venkata Giri	401,515	420,077
Neelam Sanjeeva Reddy	313,548	405,427
Chintaman Dwarkanath Deshmukh	112,769	Eliminated
Chandradatt Senani	5,814	Eliminated
Gurcharan Kaur	940	Eliminated
Rajabhoj Pandurang Nathuji	831	Eliminated
Babu Lal Mag	576	Eliminated
Chaudhary Hari Ram	125	Eliminated
Manovihari Aniruddha Sharma	125	Eliminated
Khubi Ram	94	Eliminated
Bhagmal	—	Eliminated
Krishna Kumar Chatterjee	—	Eliminated
Santosh Singh Kachhwaha	—	Eliminated
Ramdular Tripathi Chakor	—	Eliminated
Ramanlal Purushottam Vyas	—	Eliminated
Total	836,337	825,504

Prime Minister Indira Gandhi fielded Giri as her candidate against the official Congress candidate Reddy. Giri won a majority of the votes in 11 of India's 17 state legislatures although the Congress Party was in power in 12. Being a trade union leader, Giri's campaign also had the backing of the Communists and other leftist parties. Massive defections within the Congress party resulted in Reddy winning only 268 first preference votes despite the Congress Parliamentary Party having a strength of 431. Following this incident, Congress president S. Nijalingappa expelled Indira Gandhi from the Congress party for indiscipline, & Gandhi retaliated by forming her breakaway faction - Congress (Requisitionists).

== Background ==
The Congress Parliamentary Board met on July 11, 1969, to discuss the presidential candidate. The INC elites popularly known as the Syndicate had already decided on nominating Sanjiva Reddy, whose affinity to them was well known. Mrs Gandhi was naturally loath to do so. At the meeting, she suggested nominating the veteran dalit leader, Jagjivan Ram. When this was shot down, she asked that they postpone a decision to allow more time for arriving at a consensus. Nijalingappa, however, forced a vote in the six-member Parliamentary Board. Mrs Gandhi was outvoted four to two.

Even as a brooding Indira Gandhi left for Bangalore, a fresh opening presented itself. The Vice-president V V Giri announced that he would contest the presidential elections as an independent candidate. Mrs Gandhi knew that before she could support Giri against her own party's nominee, she would have to regain the initiative within the party. This she did first by forcing Morarji Desai out of the Cabinet and then by nationalizing banks. She also went ahead and filed the nomination for Sanjiva Reddy, though she refrained from issuing a whip to Congress MPs.

The Syndicate realized that Mrs Gandhi might yet come out in support of Giri. Nijalingappa took a fatal misstep by approaching the main opposition parties, Swatantra and Jana Sangh, to cast their second preference vote for Reddy (the opposition's candidate was C D Deshmukh). Mrs Gandhi seized the opportunity to denounce Nijalingappa's move. Yet, she did not formally reveal her preference until the night before the elections, when she called on her party to 'vote according to conscience'.

V V Giri won the poll by a narrow margin. The voting figures showed that a majority of Congress members had actually voted for Reddy. Giri had edged through with a minority of Congress votes and support from a curious combination of opposition groups.

== See also ==
- 1969 Indian vice presidential election
