= June 1946 French legislative election in Chad–Ubangi-Shari =

Elections to the French National Assembly were held in Chad and Ubangi-Shari on 2 June 1946. The territories elected two seats to the Assembly via two electoral colleges. René Malbrant was re-elected from the first college and Guy Baucheron de Boissoudy in the second. Both were members of the Democratic and Socialist Union of the Resistance.

== Results ==
=== First college ===
Candidate	Party	Votes	%
René Malbrant	Democratic and Socialist Union of the Resistance	822	100.00
Total		822	100.00
Valid votes		822	89.64
Invalid/blank votes		95	10.36
Total votes		917	100.00
Registered voters/turnout		1,599	57.35
Source: Sternberger et al.

=== Second college ===
Candidate	Party	Votes	%
Guy Baucheron de Boissoudy	Democratic and Socialist Union of the Resistance	4,522	57.19
Aristide Issembé	Progressive Union	2,727	34.49
Sekou Diarra	French Section of the Workers' International	185	2.34
Jane Vialle	Independent Socialists	165	2.09
Other candidates		308	3.90
Total		7,907	100.00
Valid votes		7,907	99.37
Invalid/blank votes		50	0.63
Total votes		7,957	100.00
Registered voters/turnout		11,503	69.17
Source: Sternberger et al.
