= 1969 Andorran parliamentary election =

- 12 December 1969 (first round); 23 December 1969 (second round)
- 12 of the 24 seats in the General Council
Party	Vote %	Seats	+/–
Independents	100	12	0
This lists parties that won seats. See the complete results below.

Parliamentary elections were held in Andorra on 12 December 1969 to elect half of the members of the General Council. In constituencies where not all seats were filled in the first round, a second round was held on 23 December.

The elections were held alongside local elections and were the last in which only men could vote.

== Electoral system ==
Each parish had four seats in the General Council. The seats were elected on a staggered basis, with two members elected from each parish every two years. In Andorra la Vella parish two members represented the town of Andorra la Vella and two represented Les Escaldes, with one member elected from each every two years.

All candidates had to run on lists of candidates, although voters could split their votes between candidates on different lists. Any candidate receiving a majority of the vote was elected in the first round. If there were remaining seats to fill, a second round was held, in which candidates had to receive a majority of the vote to be elected. If there were still remaining seats to fill, a third round would be held in which the candidate(s) with the most votes would be elected.

== Results ==
=== Elected members ===
Constituency	Elected members	Round
Andorra la Vella	B. Armengol	First round
Canillo	A. Casals	First round
Canillo	J. Casals	First round
Encamp	P. Font	First round
La Massana	M. Grau	First round
La Massana	J. Muntané	First round
Les Escaldes	J. Pidal	First round
Ordino	I. Baró	First round
Ordino	J. Font	First round
Sant Julià de Lòria		Second round
Sant Julià de Lòria		Second round
Source: La Vanguardia
