= 1969 Chadian presidential election =

Re-election of François Tombalbaye

- 15 June 1969
- Turnout: 93.04%
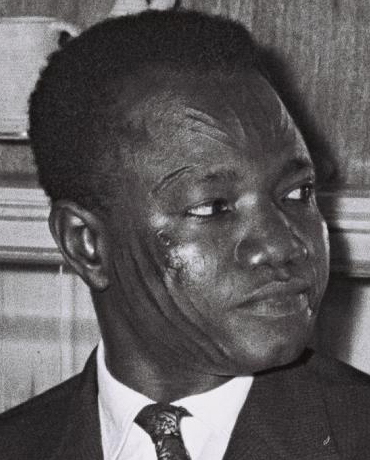
Candidate	François Tombalbaye
Party	PPT
Popular vote	1,556,113
Percentage	100%
President before election
François Tombalbaye
PPT
Elected President
François Tombalbaye
PPT

Direct presidential elections were held in Chad for the first time on 15 June 1969. Previously the President had been elected by an electoral college, but in an attempt to mobilise support, incumbent François Tombalbaye initiated direct elections. The country was a one-party state at the time, with the Chadian Progressive Party as the sole legal party and Tombalbaye ran unopposed. Voter turnout was 93%.

== Results ==
Candidate	Party	Votes	%
François Tombalbaye	Chadian Progressive Party	1,556,113	100.00
Total		1,556,113	100.00
Valid votes		1,556,113	99.61
Invalid/blank votes		6,026	0.39
Total votes		1,562,139	100.00
Registered voters/turnout		1,678,979	93.04
Source: Nohlen et al.
