= 1969 Indian vice presidential election =

Vice-presidential election in India

- 30 August 1969
Nominee	Gopal Swarup Pathak
Party	Independent
Home state	Uttar Pradesh
Electoral vote	400
Vice President before election
Vacant, last held by
Varahagiri Venkata Giri
Independent
Elected Vice President
Gopal Swarup Pathak
Independent

The 1969 Indian vice presidential election was held on 30 August 1969. Gopal Swarup Pathak won the election to become the fourth vice president of India. The election was occurred since the sitting VP, Varahagiri Venkata Giri resigned to contest the presidential election after the death of incumbent President Zakir Husain.

== Schedule ==
The election schedule was announced by the Election Commission of India on 31 July 1969.

S.No.	Poll Event	Date
1.	Last Date for filing nomination	9 August 1969
2.	Date for Scrutiny of nomination	11 August 1969
3.	Last Date for Withdrawal of nomination	14 August 1969
4.	Date of Poll	30 August 1969
5.	Date of Counting	30 August 1969

== Result ==
The Electoral College consisted of 759 members of Parliament of India. There were 6 contesting candidates and the counting of votes was taken up immediately after the conclusion of the poll. The result was declared after the first round of counting of first preference votes. Pathak was declared elected after getting 400 first preference votes.

== See also ==
- 1969 Indian presidential election
