= 1969 United Arab Republic parliamentary election =

- 8 January 1969
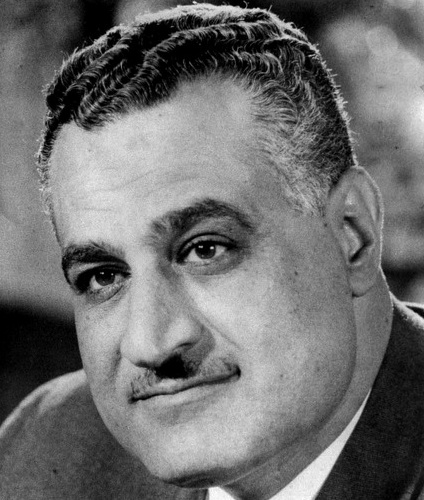
	First party
Leader	Gamal Abdel Nasser
Party	ASU
Seats won	350
Popular vote	6,368,511
Percentage	100%
Prime Minister before election
Gamal Abdel Nasser
ASU
Subsequent Prime Minister
Gamal Abdel Nasser
ASU

Parliamentary elections were held in the United Arab Republic (now Egypt) on 8 January 1969, with a second round in 13 constituencies on 13 January. At the time the country was a one-party state and all candidates had to be members of the Arab Socialist Union (ASU). Two candidates were elected from each of the 175 constituencies, with a second round of voting required if one or both of the candidates failed to win over 50% of the vote in the first round, or neither of the candidates with over 50% were classed as a worker or farmer (each constituency had to have at least one farmer or worker representing it).

The ASU organised "candidature conferences" in which it selected two candidates for each constituency, except in the Suez Canal Zone, where 12 members were declared elected under Article 16 of the National Assembly Basic Act, which stated that "in cases of extreme necessity, the President of the Republic is empowered to declare the 2 candidates elected by decree, without any elections being held". In addition to the 338 candidates nominated by the conferences, a further 470 candidates were nominated by ASU members. Of the 350 members elected, 323 were conference candidates and 27 member candidates. Voter turnout was 88.2%. Following the election, a further 10 members were appointed by the President.

== Results ==
Party	Votes	%	Seats	+/–
Arab Socialist Union	6,368,511	100.00	350	0
Presidential appointees			10	0
Total	6,368,511	100.00	360	0
Valid votes	6,368,511	96.91		
Invalid/blank votes	202,906	3.09		
Total votes	6,571,417	100.00		
Registered voters/turnout	7,448,757	88.22		
Source: IPU
