= Mahamat Zene Cherif =

Chadian diplomat (born 1964)

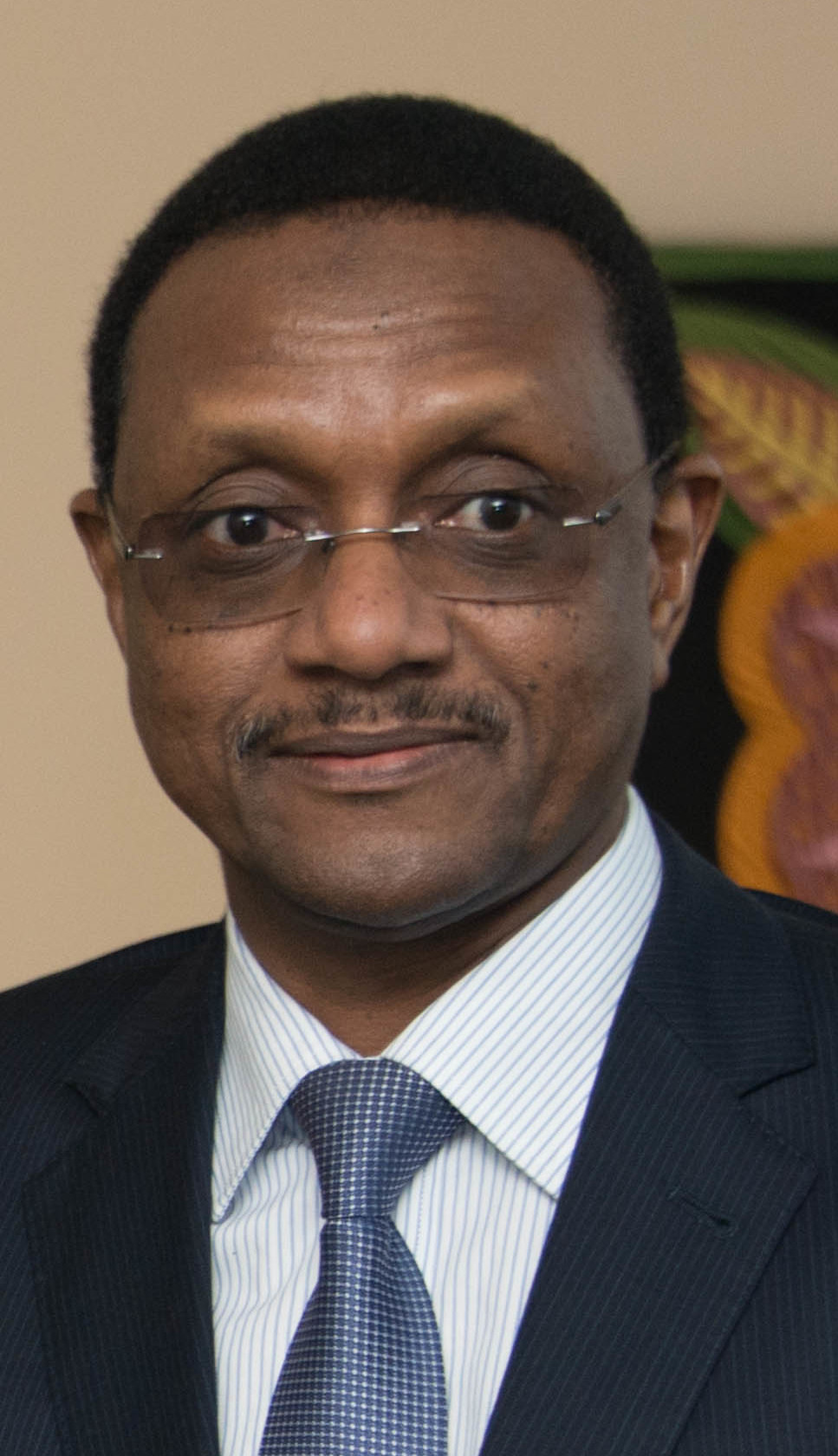
- Mahamat Zene Cherif in 2018

Minister of Foreign Affairs
- In office 24 December 2017 – 19 September 2022

Personal details
- Born: 1964 (age 61–62) Moussoro, Chad
- Education: Taras Shevchenko National University of Kyiv (LLM)

Mahamat Zene Cherif (Arabic: محمد زين شريف; born 1964) is a Chadian diplomat and politician. He served as the minister of foreign affairs from December 2017 until his resignation in September 2022. He previously served as the permanent representative of Chad to the United Nations in New York. He belongs to the toubou ethnic group.

Zene has a Master of Laws degree from the Taras Shevchenko National University of Kyiv. He joined the Chadian foreign ministry in 1993. From 2007 to 2013, he was the ambassador of Chad to Ethiopia and Chad's permanent representative to the African Union and the UN Economic Commission for Africa.

Zene has worked in a variety of other government posts and was business director of Air Chad in 1997 and 1998.

In December 2014, Zene was the president of the United Nations Security Council.

On September 19, 2022, he tendered his resignation as minister of foreign affairs.
