= Bébalem =

Coordinates: 8°59′N 16°26′E

- Sub-prefecture
- Location in Chad
- Country: Chad

Bébalem is a sub-prefecture of Logone Occidental Region in Chad.

On 16 April 1952, it was the site of the Bébalem massacre by French colonial authorities.
