= 1969 Virginia lieutenant gubernatorial election =

- November 4, 1969
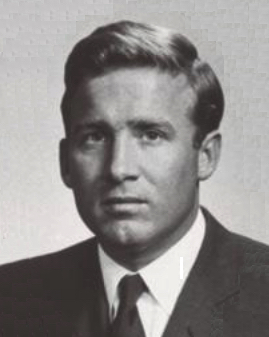

| Nominee | J. Sargeant Reynolds | H. Dunlop Dawbarn |
| Party | Democratic | Republican |
| Popular vote | 472,853 | 371,246 |
| Percentage | 53.97% | 42.37% |
- County and independent city results Reynolds: 40–50% 50–60% 60–70% 70–80% 80–90% Dawburn: 40–50% 50–60% 60–70%
Lieutenant Governor before election
Fred G. Pollard
Democratic
Elected Lieutenant Governor
J. Sargeant Reynolds
Democratic

The 1969 Virginia lieutenant gubernatorial election was held on November 4, 1969, in order to elect the lieutenant governor of Virginia. Democratic nominee and incumbent member of the Virginia Senate J. Sargeant Reynolds defeated Republican nominee and incumbent member of the Virginia Senate H. Dunlop Dawbarn, American Independent nominee Samuel J. Breeding Jr. and Conservative nominee Louis A. Brooks Jr.

== General election ==
On election day, November 4, 1969, Democratic nominee J. Sargeant Reynolds won the election by a margin of 101,607 votes against his foremost opponent Republican nominee H. Dunlop Dawbarn, thereby retaining Democratic control over the office of lieutenant governor. Reynolds was sworn in as the 30th lieutenant governor of Virginia on January 17, 1970.

=== Results ===
1969 Virginia lieutenant gubernatorial election
| Party | Candidate | Votes | % |
|---|---|---|---|
| Democratic | J. Sargeant Reynolds | 472,853 | 53.97 |
| Republican | H. Dunlop Dawbarn | 371,246 | 42.37 |
| American Independent | Samuel J. Breeding Jr. | 16,839 | 1.92 |
| Conservative | Louis A. Brooks Jr. | 15,277 | 1.74 |
| Total votes | | 876,215 | 100.00 |
| Democratic hold | | | |

==== Results by county or independent city ====
1969 Virginia lieutenant gubernatorial election by county or independent city
| | Julian Sargeant Reynolds Democratic | | Henry Dunlop Dawbarn Republican | | Samuel J. Breeding Jr. American Independent | | Louis A. Brooks Jr. Virginia Conservative | | Margin | | Total votes cast |
| | # | % | # | % | # | % | # | % | # | % | Total votes cast |
|---|---|---|---|---|---|---|---|---|---|---|---|
| Accomack County | 3,407 | 54.62% | 2,552 | 40.91% | 125 | 2.00% | 154 | 2.47% | 855 | 13.71% | 6,238 |
| Albemarle County | 3,418 | 56.83% | 2,475 | 41.15% | 52 | 0.86% | 69 | 1.15% | 943 | 15.68% | 6,014 |
| Alleghany County | 1,381 | 55.24% | 1,075 | 43.00% | 22 | 0.88% | 22 | 0.88% | 306 | 12.24% | 2,500 |
| Amelia County | 911 | 58.40% | 508 | 32.56% | 54 | 3.46% | 87 | 5.58% | 403 | 25.83% | 1,560 |
| Amherst County | 2,420 | 57.94% | 1,568 | 37.54% | 127 | 3.04% | 62 | 1.48% | 852 | 20.40% | 4,177 |
| Appomattox County | 1,887 | 66.84% | 853 | 30.22% | 69 | 2.44% | 14 | 0.50% | 1,034 | 36.63% | 2,823 |
| Arlington County | 17,579 | 49.83% | 16,730 | 47.42% | 708 | 2.01% | 264 | 0.75% | 849 | 2.41% | 35,281 |
| Augusta County | 2,203 | 30.27% | 4,937 | 67.84% | 31 | 0.43% | 106 | 1.46% | -2,734 | -37.57% | 7,277 |
| Bath County | 607 | 54.34% | 486 | 43.51% | 14 | 1.25% | 10 | 0.90% | 121 | 10.83% | 1,117 |
| Bedford County | 2,226 | 50.58% | 1,660 | 37.72% | 407 | 9.25% | 108 | 2.45% | 566 | 12.86% | 4,401 |
| Bland County | 717 | 49.65% | 674 | 46.68% | 40 | 2.77% | 13 | 0.90% | 43 | 2.98% | 1,444 |
| Botetourt County | 1,782 | 47.70% | 1,882 | 50.37% | 49 | 1.31% | 23 | 0.62% | -100 | -2.68% | 3,736 |
| Brunswick County | 1,875 | 59.09% | 1,050 | 33.09% | 114 | 3.59% | 134 | 4.22% | 825 | 26.00% | 3,173 |
| Buchanan County | 3,974 | 55.03% | 2,858 | 39.58% | 288 | 3.99% | 101 | 1.40% | 1,116 | 15.45% | 7,221 |
| Buckingham County | 1,469 | 62.04% | 582 | 24.58% | 275 | 11.61% | 42 | 1.77% | 887 | 37.46% | 2,368 |
| Campbell County | 2,512 | 42.31% | 2,942 | 49.55% | 229 | 3.86% | 254 | 4.28% | -430 | -7.24% | 5,937 |
| Caroline County | 1,726 | 70.39% | 661 | 26.96% | 33 | 1.35% | 32 | 1.31% | 1,065 | 43.43% | 2,452 |
| Carroll County | 1,987 | 35.04% | 3,588 | 63.28% | 44 | 0.78% | 51 | 0.90% | -1,601 | -28.24% | 5,670 |
| Charles City County | 982 | 82.04% | 199 | 16.62% | 9 | 0.75% | 7 | 0.58% | 783 | 65.41% | 1,197 |
| Charlotte County | 1,491 | 67.74% | 597 | 27.12% | 69 | 3.13% | 44 | 2.00% | 894 | 40.62% | 2,201 |
| Chesterfield County | 9,813 | 39.43% | 12,308 | 49.45% | 621 | 2.49% | 2,148 | 8.63% | -2,495 | -10.02% | 24,890 |
| Clarke County | 1,013 | 56.47% | 758 | 42.25% | 8 | 0.45% | 15 | 0.84% | 255 | 14.21% | 1,794 |
| Craig County | 562 | 56.54% | 417 | 41.95% | 11 | 1.11% | 4 | 0.40% | 145 | 14.59% | 994 |
| Culpeper County | 1,587 | 51.63% | 1,413 | 45.97% | 49 | 1.59% | 25 | 0.81% | 174 | 5.66% | 3,074 |
| Cumberland County | 1,227 | 68.39% | 507 | 28.26% | 31 | 1.73% | 29 | 1.62% | 720 | 40.13% | 1,794 |
| Dickenson County | 3,190 | 50.84% | 2,968 | 47.30% | 68 | 1.08% | 49 | 0.78% | 222 | 3.54% | 6,275 |
| Dinwiddie County | 2,433 | 71.64% | 810 | 23.85% | 69 | 2.03% | 84 | 2.47% | 1,623 | 47.79% | 3,396 |
| Essex County | 928 | 68.59% | 387 | 28.60% | 25 | 1.85% | 13 | 0.96% | 541 | 39.99% | 1,353 |
| Fairfax County | 32,135 | 47.29% | 34,722 | 51.10% | 570 | 0.84% | 519 | 0.76% | -2,587 | -3.81% | 67,946 |
| Fauquier County | 2,702 | 60.15% | 1,625 | 36.18% | 87 | 1.94% | 78 | 1.74% | 1,077 | 23.98% | 4,492 |
| Floyd County | 814 | 36.23% | 1,398 | 62.22% | 21 | 0.93% | 14 | 0.62% | -584 | -25.99% | 2,247 |
| Fluvanna County | 586 | 54.21% | 449 | 41.54% | 18 | 1.67% | 28 | 2.59% | 137 | 12.67% | 1,081 |
| Franklin County | 2,967 | 63.99% | 1,537 | 33.15% | 86 | 1.85% | 47 | 1.01% | 1,430 | 30.84% | 4,637 |
| Frederick County | 2,438 | 47.55% | 2,554 | 49.81% | 65 | 1.27% | 70 | 1.37% | -116 | -2.26% | 5,127 |
| Giles County | 2,674 | 59.04% | 1,753 | 38.71% | 80 | 1.77% | 22 | 0.49% | 921 | 20.34% | 4,529 |
| Gloucester County | 1,669 | 56.75% | 1,151 | 39.14% | 56 | 1.90% | 65 | 2.21% | 518 | 17.61% | 2,941 |
| Goochland County | 1,660 | 66.72% | 751 | 30.18% | 45 | 1.81% | 32 | 1.29% | 909 | 36.54% | 2,488 |
| Grayson County | 2,568 | 48.35% | 2,684 | 50.54% | 37 | 0.70% | 22 | 0.41% | -116 | -2.18% | 5,311 |
| Greene County | 446 | 42.68% | 569 | 54.45% | 14 | 1.34% | 16 | 1.53% | -123 | -11.77% | 1,045 |
| Greensville County | 1,265 | 63.92% | 642 | 32.44% | 35 | 1.77% | 37 | 1.87% | 623 | 31.48% | 1,979 |
| Halifax County | 2,638 | 55.82% | 1,959 | 41.45% | 87 | 1.84% | 42 | 0.89% | 679 | 14.37% | 4,726 |
| Hanover County | 3,474 | 47.92% | 3,521 | 48.57% | 119 | 1.64% | 135 | 1.86% | -47 | -0.65% | 7,249 |
| Henrico County | 17,406 | 45.00% | 20,321 | 52.54% | 368 | 0.95% | 584 | 1.51% | -2,915 | -7.54% | 38,679 |
| Henry County | 3,934 | 62.76% | 2,029 | 32.37% | 208 | 3.32% | 97 | 1.55% | 1,905 | 30.39% | 6,268 |
| Highland County | 283 | 35.60% | 497 | 62.52% | 8 | 1.01% | 7 | 0.88% | -214 | -26.92% | 795 |
| Isle of Wight County | 2,363 | 62.63% | 1,015 | 26.90% | 207 | 5.49% | 188 | 4.98% | 1,348 | 35.73% | 3,773 |
| James City County | 1,427 | 52.18% | 995 | 36.38% | 123 | 4.50% | 190 | 6.95% | 432 | 15.80% | 2,735 |
| King and Queen County | 794 | 67.75% | 319 | 27.22% | 25 | 2.13% | 34 | 2.90% | 475 | 40.53% | 1,172 |
| King George County | 777 | 53.55% | 644 | 44.38% | 18 | 1.24% | 12 | 0.83% | 133 | 9.17% | 1,451 |
| King William County | 1,121 | 60.27% | 686 | 36.88% | 21 | 1.13% | 32 | 1.72% | 435 | 23.39% | 1,860 |
| Lancaster County | 1,421 | 53.93% | 1,153 | 43.76% | 34 | 1.29% | 27 | 1.02% | 268 | 10.17% | 2,635 |
| Lee County | 4,472 | 56.29% | 3,170 | 39.90% | 207 | 2.61% | 96 | 1.21% | 1,302 | 16.39% | 7,945 |
| Loudoun County | 3,383 | 51.60% | 1,979 | 30.19% | 579 | 8.83% | 615 | 9.38% | 1,404 | 21.42% | 6,556 |
| Louisa County | 1,477 | 59.27% | 928 | 37.24% | 41 | 1.65% | 46 | 1.85% | 549 | 22.03% | 2,492 |
| Lunenburg County | 1,451 | 60.41% | 753 | 31.35% | 105 | 4.37% | 93 | 3.87% | 698 | 29.06% | 2,402 |
| Madison County | 751 | 41.31% | 1,010 | 55.56% | 29 | 1.60% | 28 | 1.54% | -259 | -14.25% | 1,818 |
| Mathews County | 898 | 48.51% | 893 | 48.24% | 35 | 1.89% | 25 | 1.35% | 5 | 0.27% | 1,851 |
| Mecklenburg County | 3,578 | 62.04% | 1,956 | 33.92% | 118 | 2.05% | 115 | 1.99% | 1,622 | 28.13% | 5,767 |
| Middlesex County | 768 | 51.86% | 661 | 44.63% | 23 | 1.55% | 29 | 1.96% | 107 | 7.22% | 1,481 |
| Montgomery County | 3,719 | 45.90% | 4,236 | 52.28% | 94 | 1.16% | 54 | 0.67% | -517 | -6.38% | 8,103 |
| Nansemond County | 3,942 | 64.61% | 1,887 | 30.93% | 207 | 3.39% | 65 | 1.07% | 2,055 | 33.68% | 6,101 |
| Nelson County | 1,117 | 63.68% | 571 | 32.55% | 33 | 1.88% | 33 | 1.88% | 546 | 31.13% | 1,754 |
| New Kent County | 672 | 57.83% | 427 | 36.75% | 39 | 3.36% | 24 | 2.07% | 245 | 21.08% | 1,162 |
| Northampton County | 1,667 | 58.76% | 1,095 | 38.60% | 44 | 1.55% | 31 | 1.09% | 572 | 20.16% | 2,837 |
| Northumberland County | 1,127 | 55.60% | 858 | 42.33% | 23 | 1.13% | 19 | 0.94% | 269 | 13.27% | 2,027 |
| Nottoway County | 2,008 | 62.26% | 1,088 | 33.74% | 47 | 1.46% | 82 | 2.54% | 920 | 28.53% | 3,225 |
| Orange County | 1,235 | 47.98% | 1,285 | 49.92% | 25 | 0.97% | 29 | 1.13% | -50 | -1.94% | 2,574 |
| Page County | 2,469 | 50.42% | 2,348 | 47.95% | 49 | 1.00% | 31 | 0.63% | 121 | 2.47% | 4,897 |
| Patrick County | 2,001 | 56.02% | 1,470 | 41.15% | 71 | 1.99% | 30 | 0.84% | 531 | 14.87% | 3,572 |
| Pittsylvania County | 5,560 | 63.51% | 2,322 | 26.52% | 431 | 4.92% | 442 | 5.05% | 3,238 | 36.98% | 8,755 |
| Powhatan County | 1,218 | 61.98% | 590 | 30.03% | 97 | 4.94% | 60 | 3.05% | 628 | 31.96% | 1,965 |
| Prince Edward County | 2,057 | 58.62% | 1,356 | 38.64% | 49 | 1.40% | 47 | 1.34% | 701 | 19.98% | 3,509 |
| Prince George County | 1,622 | 62.92% | 856 | 33.20% | 47 | 1.82% | 53 | 2.06% | 766 | 29.71% | 2,578 |
| Prince William County | 4,614 | 42.06% | 4,207 | 38.35% | 1,157 | 10.55% | 992 | 9.04% | 407 | 3.71% | 10,970 |
| Pulaski County | 3,824 | 56.67% | 2,773 | 41.09% | 92 | 1.36% | 59 | 0.87% | 1,051 | 15.57% | 6,748 |
| Rappahannock County | 702 | 59.19% | 434 | 36.59% | 20 | 1.69% | 30 | 2.53% | 268 | 22.60% | 1,186 |
| Richmond County | 621 | 46.76% | 687 | 51.73% | 10 | 0.75% | 10 | 0.75% | -66 | -4.97% | 1,328 |
| Roanoke County | 7,763 | 43.02% | 9,958 | 55.18% | 234 | 1.30% | 90 | 0.50% | -2,195 | -12.16% | 18,045 |
| Rockbridge County | 1,017 | 43.42% | 1,289 | 55.04% | 16 | 0.68% | 20 | 0.85% | -272 | -11.61% | 2,342 |
| Rockingham County | 3,037 | 38.41% | 4,727 | 59.79% | 65 | 0.82% | 77 | 0.97% | -1,690 | -21.38% | 7,906 |
| Russell County | 3,442 | 51.68% | 3,040 | 45.65% | 68 | 1.02% | 110 | 1.65% | 402 | 6.04% | 6,660 |
| Scott County | 2,222 | 44.40% | 2,716 | 54.27% | 45 | 0.90% | 22 | 0.44% | -494 | -9.87% | 5,005 |
| Shenandoah County | 3,215 | 45.96% | 3,568 | 51.01% | 118 | 1.69% | 94 | 1.34% | -353 | -5.05% | 6,995 |
| Smyth County | 2,510 | 37.46% | 4,087 | 61.00% | 57 | 0.85% | 46 | 0.69% | -1,577 | -23.54% | 6,700 |
| Southampton County | 2,194 | 67.28% | 938 | 28.76% | 58 | 1.78% | 71 | 2.18% | 1,256 | 38.52% | 3,261 |
| Spotsylvania County | 2,518 | 67.65% | 1,038 | 27.89% | 75 | 2.02% | 91 | 2.44% | 1,480 | 39.76% | 3,722 |
| Stafford County | 2,579 | 58.39% | 1,672 | 37.85% | 77 | 1.74% | 89 | 2.01% | 907 | 20.53% | 4,417 |
| Surry County | 1,139 | 72.23% | 397 | 25.17% | 21 | 1.33% | 20 | 1.27% | 742 | 47.05% | 1,577 |
| Sussex County | 2,039 | 71.47% | 726 | 25.45% | 47 | 1.65% | 41 | 1.44% | 1,313 | 46.02% | 2,853 |
| Tazewell County | 4,203 | 56.80% | 2,948 | 39.84% | 173 | 2.34% | 76 | 1.03% | 1,255 | 16.96% | 7,400 |
| Warren County | 2,328 | 58.36% | 1,550 | 38.86% | 57 | 1.43% | 54 | 1.35% | 778 | 19.50% | 3,989 |
| Washington County | 4,331 | 51.29% | 3,922 | 46.45% | 140 | 1.66% | 51 | 0.60% | 409 | 4.84% | 8,444 |
| Westmoreland County | 1,099 | 56.97% | 777 | 40.28% | 28 | 1.45% | 25 | 1.30% | 322 | 16.69% | 1,929 |
| Wise County | 6,168 | 56.50% | 4,593 | 42.07% | 91 | 0.83% | 65 | 0.60% | 1,575 | 14.43% | 10,917 |
| Wythe County | 2,534 | 49.39% | 2,489 | 48.51% | 88 | 1.72% | 20 | 0.39% | 45 | 0.88% | 5,131 |
| York County | 3,059 | 53.00% | 2,494 | 43.21% | 142 | 2.46% | 77 | 1.33% | 565 | 9.79% | 5,772 |
| Alexandria City | 8,339 | 50.59% | 6,373 | 38.67% | 731 | 4.44% | 1,039 | 6.30% | 1,966 | 11.93% | 16,482 |
| Bedford City | 743 | 52.92% | 550 | 39.17% | 63 | 4.49% | 48 | 3.42% | 193 | 13.75% | 1,404 |
| Bristol City | 1,876 | 69.40% | 775 | 28.67% | 34 | 1.26% | 18 | 0.67% | 1,101 | 40.73% | 2,703 |
| Buena Vista City | 558 | 48.48% | 566 | 49.17% | 10 | 0.87% | 17 | 1.48% | -8 | -0.70% | 1,151 |
| Charlottesville City | 5,290 | 63.85% | 2,849 | 34.39% | 34 | 0.41% | 112 | 1.35% | 2,441 | 29.46% | 8,285 |
| Chesapeake City | 9,430 | 59.85% | 5,688 | 36.10% | 414 | 2.63% | 224 | 1.42% | 3,742 | 23.75% | 15,756 |
| Clifton Forge City | 774 | 55.48% | 577 | 41.36% | 33 | 2.37% | 11 | 0.79% | 197 | 14.12% | 1,395 |
| Colonial Heights City | 1,809 | 53.08% | 1,258 | 36.91% | 65 | 1.91% | 276 | 8.10% | 551 | 16.17% | 3,408 |
| Covington City | 1,501 | 59.63% | 979 | 38.90% | 21 | 0.83% | 16 | 0.64% | 522 | 20.74% | 2,517 |
| Danville City | 5,610 | 57.30% | 4,024 | 41.10% | 73 | 0.75% | 83 | 0.85% | 1,586 | 16.20% | 9,790 |
| Emporia City | 871 | 58.61% | 555 | 37.35% | 27 | 1.82% | 33 | 2.22% | 316 | 21.27% | 1,486 |
| Fairfax City | 1,770 | 50.31% | 1,592 | 45.25% | 66 | 1.88% | 90 | 2.56% | 178 | 5.06% | 3,518 |
| Falls Church City | 1,471 | 55.11% | 1,126 | 42.19% | 31 | 1.16% | 41 | 1.54% | 345 | 12.93% | 2,669 |
| Franklin City | 834 | 57.40% | 565 | 38.89% | 30 | 2.06% | 24 | 1.65% | 269 | 18.51% | 1,453 |
| Fredericksburg City | 2,635 | 67.13% | 1,216 | 30.98% | 38 | 0.97% | 36 | 0.92% | 1,419 | 36.15% | 3,925 |
| Galax City | 971 | 53.06% | 843 | 46.07% | 11 | 0.60% | 5 | 0.27% | 128 | 6.99% | 1,830 |
| Hampton City | 12,284 | 62.76% | 6,879 | 35.14% | 255 | 1.30% | 156 | 0.80% | 5,405 | 27.61% | 19,574 |
| Harrisonburg City | 1,509 | 46.99% | 1,659 | 51.67% | 18 | 0.56% | 25 | 0.78% | -150 | -4.67% | 3,211 |
| Hopewell City | 2,014 | 46.88% | 1,972 | 45.90% | 31 | 0.72% | 279 | 6.49% | 42 | 0.98% | 4,296 |
| Lexington City | 666 | 48.54% | 690 | 50.29% | 9 | 0.66% | 7 | 0.51% | -24 | -1.75% | 1,372 |
| Lynchburg City | 4,347 | 43.94% | 5,043 | 50.98% | 243 | 2.46% | 260 | 2.63% | -696 | -7.04% | 9,893 |
| Martinsville City | 2,527 | 64.45% | 1,303 | 33.23% | 58 | 1.48% | 33 | 0.84% | 1,224 | 31.22% | 3,921 |
| Newport News City | 13,334 | 60.78% | 8,047 | 36.68% | 358 | 1.63% | 200 | 0.91% | 5,287 | 24.10% | 21,939 |
| Norfolk City | 25,577 | 60.64% | 15,036 | 35.65% | 1,277 | 3.03% | 289 | 0.69% | 10,541 | 24.99% | 42,179 |
| Norton City | 528 | 54.83% | 418 | 43.41% | 14 | 1.45% | 3 | 0.31% | 110 | 11.42% | 963 |
| Petersburg City | 4,989 | 73.01% | 1,681 | 24.60% | 62 | 0.91% | 101 | 1.48% | 3,308 | 48.41% | 6,833 |
| Portsmouth City | 15,506 | 69.71% | 6,308 | 28.36% | 294 | 1.32% | 135 | 0.61% | 9,198 | 41.35% | 22,243 |
| Radford City | 1,643 | 54.66% | 1,330 | 44.24% | 17 | 0.57% | 16 | 0.53% | 313 | 10.41% | 3,006 |
| Richmond City | 30,432 | 67.38% | 13,923 | 30.83% | 291 | 0.64% | 518 (Note: Two write-in votes were reported from this county or city.) | 1.15% | 16,509 | 36.55% | 45,166 |
| Roanoke City | 11,904 | 54.23% | 9,727 | 44.31% | 199 | 0.91% | 120 | 0.55% | 2,177 | 9.92% | 21,950 |
| Salem City | 867 | 49.88% | 853 | 49.08% | 8 | 0.46% | 10 | 0.58% | 14 | 0.81% | 1,738 |
| South Boston City | 3,308 | 46.58% | 3,688 | 51.94% | 65 | 0.92% | 40 | 0.56% | -380 | -5.35% | 7,101 |
| Staunton City | 2,135 | 40.50% | 3,087 | 58.55% | 21 | 0.40% | 29 | 0.55% | -952 | -18.06% | 5,272 |
| Suffolk City | 1,408 | 59.97% | 885 | 37.69% | 47 | 2.00% | 8 | 0.34% | 523 | 22.27% | 2,348 |
| Virginia Beach City | 12,483 | 51.41% | 11,212 | 46.17% | 458 | 1.89% | 130 | 0.54% | 1,271 | 5.23% | 24,283 |
| Waynesboro City | 1,277 | 29.98% | 2,818 | 66.15% | 48 | 1.13% | 117 | 2.75% | -1,541 | -36.17% | 4,260 |
| Williamsburg City | 823 | 51.05% | 519 | 32.20% | 119 | 7.38% | 151 | 9.37% | 304 | 18.86% | 1,612 |
| Winchester City | 1,591 | 51.42% | 1,444 | 46.67% | 21 | 0.68% | 38 | 1.23% | 147 | 4.75% | 3,094 |
| Totals | 472,853 | 53.97% | 371,246 | 42.37% | 16,839 | 1.92% | 15,277 | 1.74% | 101,607 | 11.60% | 876,217 |
