= Minister of Finance and Budget (Chad) =

Minister of Finance and Budget of Chad is a government minister in charge of the Ministry of Finance and Budget of Chad, responsible for public finances of the country.

== Ministers ==
- Djibrine Kherallah, 1959-1960
- Ahmed Kotoko, 1960
- Djibrine Kherallah, 1960-1961
- Abdoulaye Lamana, 1962-1963
- Djidingar Dono Ngardoum, ?-1965
- Abakar Sanga Traoré, 1966-1968
- Abdoulaye Lamana, 1968-1971
- Djibrine Kherallah, 1971
- Élie Roumba, 1971-1973
- Bajoglo (Jacques) Baroum, 1973
- N'Deingar Mbailemdana, 1973-1974
- Negue Djogo, 1975-1976
- Madengar Beremadje, 1976-1978
- Ahmat Mahamat Saleh, 1978
- Élie Roumba, 1978-1979
- Kosnaye (Michel) N'Gangbet, 1979-1982
- Jean Alingué Bawoyeu, 1982
- Élie Roumba, 1982-1986
- N'Deingar Mbailemdana, 1988-1990
- Mohiddine Salah, 1990-1991
- Gali Gatta Pierre N'Gothe, 1991
- Mohiddine Salah, 1992
- Abdelkader Safi, 1992-1993
- Amos Reoulengar, 1993-1994
- Albert Pahimi, 1994-1995
- Mahamat Ahmat Alhabo, 1995-1996
- Bichara Chérif Daoussa, 1996-2000
- Mahamat Ali Hassan, 2000-2001
- Mahamat Louani, 2001
- Idriss Ahmat Idriss, 2001-2004
- Ahmat Awad Sakine, 2004-2005
- Ngeyam Djaibe, 2005
- Abbas Mahamat Tolli, 2005-2008
- Gata Ngoulou, 2008-2011
- Christian Georges Diguimbaye, 2011-2013
- Bedoumra Kordjé, 2013-2015
- Ngarlenan Docdjengar, 2015-2016
- Allamine Bourma Treye, 2016
- Mbogo Ngabo Seli, 2016-2017
- Christian Georges Diguimbaye, 2017
- Abdoulaye Sabre Fadoul, 2017-2018
- Issa Mahamat Abdelmahmout, 2018
- Mahamat Allali Abakar, 2018-2019
- Tahir Hamid Nguilin, 2019-

== See also ==
- Economy of Chad
