= 1969 United Kingdom local elections =

Local elections took place in the United Kingdom in 1969.

After the sweeping Conservative gains in the local elections of 1967 and 1968, the Labour Party – which had been in government since 1964 – was left with little to defend. But the Labour Party still stood to lose ground because the council wards being fought in 1969 had last been fought at a good time for them: in 1966 in the afterglow of Labour's decisive victory in the general election six weeks previously. In 1969, Labour declined to field candidates in some seats where they might have had a chance of winning some years previously. There was a decline in the number of candidates from the Liberal Party and Scottish National Party and other, minor, parties. By contrast, the Conservatives were by this time trying their luck in areas they had not stood before, even at the expense of their erstwhile independent, progressive and moderate allies – particularly in Scotland.

In Northern Ireland, the election was complex. It was also the last election of the Northern Irish parliament before Direct Rule was imposed. While nationalists and republicans and the local Labour Party did not perform particularly well in the election, the unionist vote was split between support for the moderate O'Neill's reform plans and the more intransigent unionists.

Labour were left with their lowest number of councillors for years, and were reliant on aldermen to retain control of some councils. Even Huyton, represented in the House of Commons by Prime Minister Harold Wilson, was gained by the Conservatives. However, Labour were able to take some comfort from a slight swing in their favour since their heavy defeat in the 1968 local elections in London.

The Liberals had a mixed performance, losing all their councillors in some towns such as Bolton and Buxton, but advancing in cities such as Birmingham and Leeds. There was an overall decline in the Scottish Nationalist vote.

== See also ==
- 1969 Scottish local elections
