= Independent Socialist Party of Chad =

Independent Socialist Party of Chad Parti socialiste indépendant du Tchad
- Abbreviation: PSIT
- Chairperson: Ahmed Koulamallah
- Founded: 21 September 1950
- Dissolved: 1956
- Succeeded by: MSA (de facto)
- Ideology: Islamic socialism; Anti-colonialism; Chadian nationalism
- Religion: Sunni Islam
- National affiliation: FACT (1952)

The Independent Socialist Party of Chad (French: Parti socialiste indépendant du Tchad, PSIT), initially called Independent Social Party of Chad, was a political party in Chad.

== History ==
PSIT was founded on 21 September 1950 at a General Assembly, with André Labrouquère, a French socialist leader and freemason, playing a major role in its establishment. The party statues were adopted on 10 October at another General Assembly with around 500 participants.

The chairman of PSIT was Ahmed Koulamallah. Koulamallah had been the treasurer of the Democratic Union of Chad (UDT), but been expelled for financial mismanagement. Adoum Aganaye, a former leader of the Chadian Progressive Party (PPT), was the first vice chairman of the party. Mohamed Akouna, Gabriel Yakité and Mohamed Talba were the other vice chairs of the party. Sékou Diarra, a former UDT and PPT member, became treasurer of the party. The leading committee of the party had two other members, Souleymane Naye (former PPT member) and Brahim Séid (CFTC organizer).

The party contested the 1951 elections to the French National Assembly with Koulamallah and Aganaye as its candidates. The party was assigned the lion as its election symbol and green as its election colour. The list of the party received 13,467 votes (8.2%), failing to win a seat. The party achieved its best result in Salamat, where it obtained 60% of the vote.

In 1952 the party was part of a short-lived coalition with the Chadian Progressive Party, the Civic Action Front of Chad. Under Koulamallah's leader PSIT was divided into two in 1955. A group of expelled PSIT leaders, led by Ahmed Kotoko, formed a new Independent Socialist Party of Chad. In 1956 Koulamallah founded a section of the African Socialist Movement, replacing his PSIT.

== Support base ==
The majority of PSIT supporters were Muslims.
