= Quatre Sou Quatre =

Chadian politician

Quatre Sou Quatre (born January 1, 1904, in Takaba, Chad, and died March 23, 1963) was a politician from Chad who served in the French National Assembly from 1951 to 1955.
