= Independent Socialist Party of Chad (1955) =

Independent Socialist Party of Chad Parti socialiste indépendant du Tchad
- Abbreviation: PSIT
- Chairperson: Chérif Hamid Mahamat
- General Secretary: Ahmed Kotoko
- Founded: 27 March 1955
- Split from: PSIT
- Ideology: Islamic socialism; Anti-colonialism; Chadian nationalism

The Independent Socialist Party of Chad (French: Parti socialiste indépendant du Tchad, PSIT) was a political party in Chad.

== History ==
The party emerged from a split of the Independent Socialist Party of Chad in 1955. The new version of PSIT was constituted at a General Assembly held on 27 March 1955. The Assembly adopted statues for the party and a politburo was constituted, with Ahmed Kotoko as general secretary, Chérif Hamid Mahamat as chairman and Mahamat Yakouma and Ali Kamara as vice chairmen.

The new PSIT joined the Entente coalition for the 1957 Territorial Assembly elections. The Entente won 57 of the 65 seats, with PSIT taking a single seat.
