= Gabriel Lisette =

Chadian politician (1919–2001)

Gabriel Francisco Lisette
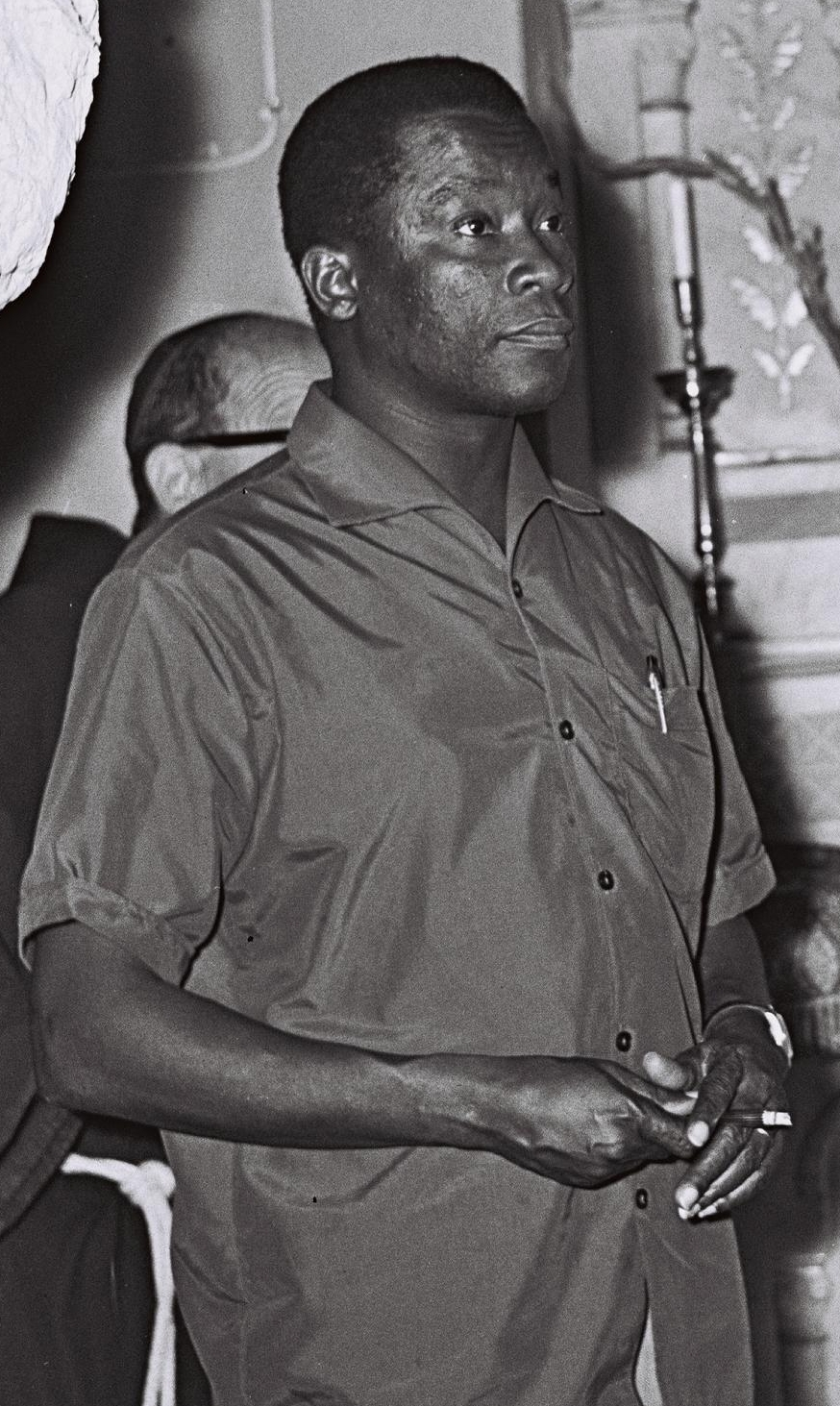
- Gabriel Lisette during a visit to the Basilica of the Annunciation in Nazareth, 1960

President of the Government of Chad
- In office 1958–1959
- Preceded by: None
- Succeeded by: Gontchomé Sahoulba

Personal details
- Born: 2 April 1919 Portobelo, Panama
- Died: 3 March 2001 (aged 81) Port-de-Lanne, France

Gabriel Francisco Lisette (2 April 1919 – 3 March 2001) was a Chadian politician who played a key role in the decolonization of Chad.

== Biography ==
Of African descent, he was born at Portobelo in Panama on 2 April 1919. He became a French colonial administrator, and in this role was posted to Chad in 1946. In November of the same year Lisette was elected as deputy to the French National Assembly. In February 1947 he founded the country's first African political party, the Chadian Progressive Party (PPT), a radical and nationalist organization calling for self-determination. It was a branch of the inter-territorial African Democratic Rally, a big tent anticolonial party, of which he was to be later chosen as secretary-general. Women, like Kalthouma Nguembang, were important to the foundation of the party.

Although the PPT was a relatively moderate party and Lisette was close to Félix Houphouët-Boigny, it was much more radical than its main rival, the Muslim-dominated Chadian Democratic Union (UDT). It grew into an important opponent of the colonial administration, helping to organize trade union movement in the Cotonfran factories. Meanwhile, the colonial administrators and chiefs were close to the UDT.

Originally much weaker than the UDT, Lisette lost his seat in the National Assembly in the 1951 elections, in which the two second college seats were both won by the UDT. The 1952 local elections led to the Bébalem massacre carried out by colonial authorities after protesting farmers disputed the victory of the UDT over the PPT.

The PPT was not immediately successful, as it found itself boycotted by the French colonial administration and from the African traditional rulers, who preferred the more conservative Chadian Democratic Union (UDT). The situation radically changed with the French Overseas Reform Act of 1956 which greatly expanded the electoral suffrage. Also, the UDT was riven by splits and dissensions; as a result, Lisette triumphantly won the 1957 elections for the Territorial Assembly, taking with his allies 47 seats out of 65.

Following this victory Lisette became first on 14 May 1957, Vice-President, and then, on 26 July 1958, President of the Government Council. He kept this position until he was deserted by the African traditional rulers, who supported a motion of no confidence presented on 11 February 1959, behind which was Ahmed Koulamallah. Lisette was able to immediately throw-down the two succeeding governments led by Gontchomé Sahoulba and Koulamallah, but when the PPT had again to form the government he stepped down in favour of a native Chadian, the party's secretary-general François Tombalbaye, who became head of the government on 26 March. Lisette entered the government as deputy Prime Minister in charge of economic coordination and foreign affairs.

But Lisette's fall was nearing: a week before Chad became independent on 11 August 1960, Tombalbaye purged him from the PPT, declared him a noncitizen while he was traveling abroad, and barred him from returning to Chad. This event signed the end of Lisette's political career in Chad, and Lisette went in exile in France, where he had been named on 23 July 1959 "councillor minister" in the government guided by Michel Debré, a formal charge he would keep till 19 May 1961. In exile he continued to worry Tombalbaye as a possible menace for his regime, especially from 1971 when relations between France and Chad started cooling.

In 1976 he founded with Alain Girard a non-governmental organization, the Société mutuelle des originaires d'Outre-Mer (SMODOM), with in mind the mutual aid societies active in Europe in the 19th century. As those, its main finalities were to create a society whose members covered the expenses if one of them was ill or, if dead, could not afford a funeral.

He later wrote a book on the events to which he participated, Le Combat du Rassemblement démocratique African pour la décolonisation pacifique de l'Afrique noire.

He died at Port-de-Lanne, in France, on 3 March 2001.

Political offices
Preceded by (none)	President of the Government of Chad; 1958–1959	Succeeded by Gontchomé Sahoulba
