= Mohamed Bechir-Sow =

Chadian politician

Mohamed Bechir-Sow (November 27, 1907, in Fort-Lamy, Chad – April 4, 1976, in N'Djamena) was a politician from Chad who served in the French Senate from 1947 to 1951 and the French National Assembly from 1951 to 1955.
