= 1952 Chadian Territorial Assembly election =

Territorial Assembly elections were held in Chad on 30 March 1952. The result was a victory for Gaullist parties, with the Rally of the French People winning all 15 seats in the First College and the Chadian Democratic Union winning 24 of the 30 seats in the Second College.

== Electoral system ==
The 45-seat Territorial Assembly had 15 seats elected by the first college in two constituencies, and 30 seats elected by the second college in ten constituencies.

== Results ==
Party	First College			Second College			Total seats
Party	Votes	%	Seats	Votes	%	Seats	Total seats
Chadian Democratic Union				117,069	72.36	24	24
Civic Action Front of Chad				33,769	20.87	6	6
Independent Socialist Party of Chad				3,796	2.35	0	0
Defence of the Regional Interests of Ouaddaï				1,125	0.70	0	0
Franco-Kanembou Union				1,013	0.63	0	0
Rally of the French People	699	70.68	15				15
Social and Economic Action	165	16.68	0				0
Independents and Union of Chad	94	9.50	0				0
Defence of Economic Interests	31	3.13	0				0
Independents				5,006	3.09	0	0
Total	989	100.00	15	161,778	100.00	30	45
Valid votes	989	97.44		161,778	98.88		
Invalid/blank votes	26	2.56		1,826	1.12		
Total votes	1,015	100.00		163,604	100.00		
Registered voters/turnout	3,582	28.34		307,434	53.22		
Source: Lanne

=== Elected members ===
Five of the fifteen elected members of the First (European) College were civil servants and the remaining ten were a mix of notable businessmen, small entrepreneurs, transporters, and a hunting guide (Louis Jacquelot).

First College
Name	Party	Constituency
Jacques Ansot	RPF-DIT	North
Noël Gassend	RPF-DIT	North
Charles Hannot	RPF-DIT	North
Pierre Jamat	RPF-DIT	North
Henri Lepissier	RPF-DIT	North
René Mauclair	RPF-DIT	North
Paul Olivier	RPF-DIT	North
Jérôme Paizee	RPF-DIT	North
Roger Petitjean	RPF-DIT	North
William Tardrew	RPF-DIT	North
Paul Belleteste	RPF-DIT	South
Georges Gerin	RPF-DIT	South
Louis Jacquelot	RPF-DIT	South
André Kieffer	RPF-DIT	South
Marcel Lallia	RPF-DIT	South

== Aftermath ==
In the southern town of Bébalem, the announcement of the Chadian Progressive Party's defeat by the UDT (with the latter being close to colonial and traditional elites) led to farmer protests and subsequently the Bébalem massacre by colonial authorities.
