= 1969 Chadian parliamentary election =

- 14 December 1969
- All 101 seats in the National Assembly
- Turnout: 95.11%
Party	Leader	Vote %	Seats	+/–
PPT	François Tombalbaye	100	101	+26
This lists parties that won seats. See the complete results below.

Parliamentary elections were held in Chad on 14 December 1969. The country was a one-party state at the time, with the Chadian Progressive Party as the sole legal party. It therefore won all seats in the National Assembly, which was enlarged from 75 to 101 seats. Voter turnout was 95.11%.

== Results ==
Party	Votes	%	Seats	+/–
Chadian Progressive Party	1,580,593	100.00	101	+26
Total	1,580,593	100.00	101	+26
Valid votes	1,580,593	99.82		
Invalid/blank votes	2,829	0.18		
Total votes	1,583,422	100.00		
Registered voters/turnout	1,664,848	95.11		
Source: Sternberger et al.
