= Gontchomé Sahoulba =

Chadian politician (1909–1963)

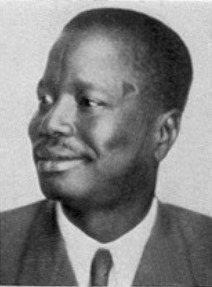
Gontchomé Sahoulba

Gontchomé Sahoulba (16 October 1909 – 1963) was a Chadian politician who played a prominent role during the decolonization in Chad. Born in 1909, he was a Moundang chief of Mayo-Kebbi, in what was then the French colony of Chad.

== Political activity in UDT ==
Sahoulba entered national politics when political parties were officially accepted in 1946 by founding the Chadian Democratic Union (UDT), the first African political party, conservative in its outlook and favoured by the colonial administration, with other traditional leaders. The party had no true opposition in local elections until 1953. Sahoulba also served in the French Senate from 1951-1959. From 1953 the UDT started to be superseded in French and popular support by the Chadian Social Action (AST), to which Sahoulba adhered with other prominent politicians like Ahmed Koulamallah, Bechi Sow and Ahmed Kotoko.

== Political activity in GIRT ==
But the picture radically changed in 1956, with the electoral reforms that greatly expanded the number of eligible voters, giving strength to the Gabriel Lisette's nationalistic Chadian Progressive Party (PPT). Sahoulba decided with others to leave the AST before the 1957 elections for the Territorial Assembly, forming the Groupement des Indépendants et Ruraux Tchadiens (GIRT). In the elections the PPT triumphed, while the GIRT came second with 9 seats out of 65.

Gabriel Lisette formed Chad's first African government, but it didn't last long: Sahoulba and Koulamallah formed a new party, the Chadian Popular Movement (Mouvement Populaire Tchadien or MPT) which following a motion of no confidence presented February 11, 1959, was instrumental in causing the downfall of Lisette. Sahoulba succeeded him as President of the Provisional Government, forming a government of which he was the only southern Chadian. This exclusion of the south generated high resentment, and brought Koulamallah to ally himself with Lisette against Sahoulba; as a result, a new motion of no confidence was approved with 35 votes against 30, and a new government was formed by Koulamallah March 13, 1959. Sahoulba now on ceased to play any significant role in Chadian politics; he was to die in 1963.

== Sources ==
- Gontchomé Sahoulba via the French Senate website

Political offices
Preceded by Gabriel Lisette	President of the Government of Chad; 1959	Succeeded by Ahmed Koulamallah
