= Independent Democratic Union of Chad =

Former political party in Chad

The Independent Democratic Union of Chad (French: Union démocratique indépendante du Tchad, UDIT) was a political party in Chad.

== History ==
The party won 16 seats in the 1959 parliamentary elections, emerging as the main opposition to the Chadian Progressive Party–African Democratic Rally alliance.
