= Djibrine Kherallah =

Chadian politician and diplomat

Foreign Minister of Chad
- In office 1961–1963
- Preceded by: Pierre Toura Gaba
- Succeeded by: Maurice Ngangtar

Djibrine Kherallah (1926 – 21 October 2001) was a Chadian Muslim politician and diplomat. He served as minister of finance and foreign affairs in 1960s and 1970s.

Preceded by Pierre Toura Gaba	Foreign Minister of Chad; 1961-1963	Succeeded by Maurice Ngangtar
