= Chadian Social Action =

Chadian political party

Chadian Social Action (French: Action sociale tchadienne, AST) was a political party in Chad.

== History ==
The party was founded in 1953. An offshoot of the Chadian Democratic Union (UDT), it also represented French commercial interest and Muslim and African traditional chiefs, and its leaders included Gontchomé Sahoulba, Ahmed Koulamallah, Mohamed Bechir-Sow and Ahmed Kotoko.

The AST quickly superseded the UDT in importance, gaining support principally in Logone, Mayo-Kébbi, Ouaddaï, Batha and Chari-Baguirmi. At the same time the Chadian Progressive Party (PPT) started gaining support in southern Chad, helped by the extension of the suffrage in 1956. In the 1956 French National Assembly elections the PPT and AST each won one of Chad's two second college seats. However, the AST soon began to experience serious dissensions, resulting in Koulamallah and Sahoulba leaving the party, the latter forming the Grouping of Rural and Independent Chadians (GIRT).

In the 1957 Territorial Assembly elections the AST won only seven seats, being defeated by the PPT (32 seats) and GIRT (9 seats). The 1959 elections saw the party win nine seats, and it was part of short-lived governments headed by Sahoulba and Koulamallah. However, when François Tombalbaye became Prime Minister, the party returned to opposition.

In February 1962 the party was banned, with the PPT declared the sole legal party.
