= 1957 Chadian Territorial Assembly election =

Election held in French Chad

Territorial Assembly elections were held in French Chad on 31 March 1957. The result was a victory for the Entente alliance, led by the Chadian Progressive Party, which won 57 of the 65 seats.

== Campaign ==
The Entente and Chadian Social Action ran a single list in Ouaddaï, competing against the African Socialist Movement.

== Results ==
The Entente won 57 seats, of which the Chadian Progressive Party took 32 seats, the Grouping of Rural and Independent Chadians nine, the Democratic and Socialist Union of the Resistance seven, Radicals and Radical Socialists seven, and the Independent Socialist Party of Chad one.

| Party | Votes | % | Seats |
|---|---|---|---|
| Entente | 443,762 | 83.42 | 57 |
| Chadian Social Action | 54,138 | 10.18 | 7 |
| African Socialist Movement | 30,917 | 5.81 | 0 |
| Independents | 3,157 | 0.59 | 1 |
| Total | 531,974 | 100.00 | 65 |
| Valid votes | 531,974 | 97.83 | |
| Invalid/blank votes | 11,809 | 2.17 | |
| Total votes | 543,783 | 100.00 | |
| Registered voters/turnout | 1,196,308 | 45.46 | |
Source: Sternberger et al.

== Aftermath ==
Following the elections, the result in Chari-Baguirmi was annulled, with a by-election held on 1 June 1958. The 7-seat constituency had been won by the Entente, but the by-election saw a victory for the Chadian Socialist Union.
