= Chadian Democratic Union =

Chadian Democratic Union Union démocratique tchadienne
- Abbreviation: UDT
- Leader: Gontchomé Sahoulba (1946–1960)
- Founded: 1945
- Dissolved: 1960
- Headquarters: Fort Lamy
- Ideology: Anti-colonialism; Chadian nationalism; Muslim interests

The Chadian Democratic Union (French: Union démocratique tchadienne, UDT) was a political party in Chad.

== History ==
The party was established in Fort Lamy in 1945. Following the General Council elections, members of the Chadian-French Progressive List (which had won 7 seats), Republican Union (four seats) and Franco-Chadian Progressive Group (unrepresented) formed the new party, which was also joined by two of the three elected independents. Its founders were mainly by African traditional leaders including Gontchomé Sahoulba, with the party representing French commercial interests and a bloc of traditional leaders composed primarily of Muslim and Ouaddaïan nobility. It was linked with the Rally of the French People (RPF), a Gaullist conservative political party representing the Europeans in Chad, and also sided with the other political parties founded in Chad by European expatriates.

Members of the UDT party at first won easily local elections; it won both seats in the June 1946 French National Assembly elections. Although it only won one seat in the November 1946 elections, it won all three seats in the 1951 elections. In the 1952 Territorial Assembly elections the party received 72% of the Second College vote, winning 24 of the 30 seats, whilst the RPF won all 15 First College seats.

However, from 1953 it began to be superseded by Chadian Social Action, which had broken away from the UDT. As a result, the UDT started dissolving itself, having also come under threat from the emergence of the Chadian Progressive Party (PPT), which was more radical and nationalistic. In the 1957 Territorial Assembly elections, which saw a victory for the PPT, the UDT had only a marginal role as an ally of the PPT.

The party was dissolved in 1960.
