= Chadian Progressive Party =

Political party in Chad (1947–1975)

Chadian Progressive Party Parti progressiste tchadien
- Founder: Gabriel Lisette
- Founded: 1947; 79 years ago
- Banned: 1975; 51 years ago
- Headquarters: N'Djamena, Chad
- Ideology: African nationalism; Pan-Africanism; Anti-imperialism; African socialism; Anti-colonialism; Sara interests (from 1960)
- Political position: Left-wing
- International affiliation: African Democratic Rally

The Chadian Progressive Party (French: Parti progressiste tchadien, PPT), known as the National Movement for the Cultural and Social Revolution (French: Mouvement National pour la Révolution Culturelle et Sociale, MNRCS) for the last two years of its existence, was the first African political party in Chad. It was a regional branch of the African Democratic Rally (RDA).

== Early years ==
=== Foundation ===
The party was founded in February 1947, by Gabriel Lisette. It was founded shortly after political parties were made legal in Chad, which happened in 1946.

Lisette had grown up in Guadeloupe, in the French Caribbean, and came to Africa in 1944. He worked in the offices of the Governor-General of French Equatorial Africa in 1945, where he met Gabriel d'Arboussier. D'Arboussier would later lead the African Democratic Rally (RDA), of which the PPT was a member. Lisette was elected to the French National Assembly in elections in November 1946, running as part of a Communist-aligned coalition.

Lisette founded the PPT as the Chadian branch of the RDA. Its early membership consisted of a small core of Chadian intellectuals and politicians, including future Chadian president François Tombalbaye. Lisette and the PPT focused on gradual and peaceful decolonization, and was strongly opposed to French discrimination against Africans.

=== Rivalry with UDT ===
From the start, the PPT was in conflict with the other main Chadian political party, the Chadian Democratic Union (French: Union Démocratique Tchadienne; UDT). Within a few months of the parties' founding, PPT and UDT supporters fought in Fort Lamy and Fort Archambault (now N'Djamena and Sarh, respectively).

The UDT was a Chadian version of Charles de Gaulle's Rally of the French People party, and held center-right politics that conflicted with the left-wing positions of the PPT. There were also geographic and ethnographic splits between the parties. The PPT had been founded in Moundou, in the cotton-producing region of Southwestern Chad, and had a core of support from the Sara people in that region. The PPT was also aligned with trade unions, while UDT was aligned with the French administration. The PPT initially attracted support mainly from the country's non-Muslim intellectuals.

Despite its opposition to the UDT and the French administration, the PPT was a relatively moderate party in the colonial period. Lisette was close to Félix Houphouët-Boigny, the future President of the Ivory Coast, and both men advocated a slow independence process and distanced themselves from the French Communist Party by 1951. However, it was more radical and nationalistic than its main rival, the Muslim-dominated Chadian Democratic Union (UDT). This was revealed by the PPT motto: "Enough with cotton! Enough with taxes! Enough with chiefs!" (Plus de coton! Plus d’impôts! Plus de chefs!).

=== Late colonial era (1950-1960) ===
Despite Lisette's position in the French Parliament, the PPT failed to gain traction in Chad. The colonial government favored the UDT and worked to undermine the PPT's attempts at growth. Lisette lost his seat in the National Assembly in the 1951 elections, in which the two second college seats were both won by the UDT. The 1952 local elections led to the Bébalem massacre, in which colonial authorities fired on a seated and unarmed group of farmers disputing the victory of the UDT over the PPT.

The PPT regained a role in government when Lisette was elected back to the French National Assembly in 1956, with the PPT benefiting from high voter turnout in their strongholds in Southwestern Chad. Electoral reforms in 1956 had expanded the pool of eligible voters and saw power begin to pass to the Christian and Animist south where the PPT had most of its support.

The UDT had been dominant in the 1952 elections, but by 1956, it had been superseded by the Chadian Social Action party (AST). The PPT, meanwhile, continued gathering strength. For the 1957 elections, they formed the Entente Républicaine with other opponents of the AST, labelling the AST the "party of the white men and of the chiefs". They won a majority in the Assembly, with only 9 of the 65 assembly seats held by the AST. Divisions between the North and South, Muslims and Christians, and the ethnic groups of the country were exploited by the French colonial authorities and the new parties vying for control of the country post-independence.

== Post-independence ==
=== Early political dominance in independent Chad ===
Chad was designated as an autonomous member state of the French Community in November 1958, becoming self-governing en route to full independence in 1960. The PPT maintained its dominance in the 1959 elections, taking 57 of the 84 seats. The party's leader, François Tombalbaye, became Prime Minister of the soon-to-be-independent country, and he would become President upon independence.

Lisette, the party's founder, was named as Vice-President of Chad under Tombalbaye, but Lisette quickly fell out of favor as Tombalbaye took control of both the party and the country. Lisette's history as an immigrant to Chad became a liability, and his reliance upon a power base from the Sara people that was limited to southern Chad left him without much power. In 1960, Lisette was barred from country and his faction was purged from the PPT, leaving Tombalbaye the unchallenged leader of the party.

=== One-party era ===
Under Tombalbaye, the PPT became the only political party allowed in Chad. Tombalbaye dissolved the opposition coalition in January 1962, ahead of the 1962 Chadian parliamentary election in March. A new constitution made Chad a one-party state, with the PPT as the sole legal party, and a 1964 parliamentary resolution required all members of the National Assembly to be members of the PPT.

As a result, the party won every seat in the National Assembly in the 1962, 1963 and 1969 parliamentary elections, whilst PPT leader François Tombalbaye was re-elected President unopposed in 1969. Whilst women formed an early part of the political party, by 1968 Kalthouma Nguembang was the only woman in the National Assembly.

=== Fall of the PPT ===
Although the PPT had complete control of the Chadian government, they did not have full control of the country. Uprisings and rebellions against Tombalbaye and the PPT's autocracy began in northern Chad by 1963. In 1966, Northern Chadians formed the rebel group Front for the National Liberation of Chad (FROLINAT), based in the neighboring country of Sudan. The rising tensions in Chad developed into a civil war.

Amid the civil war, and in response to recent coup attempts, the party was reformed in 1973 into the "National Movement for the Cultural and Social Revolution" to consolidate support for Tombalbaye. However, two years later Tombalbaye was overthrown and killed in a coup and the party was banned in April 1975.

== Electoral history ==
=== Presidential elections ===
Election	Party candidate	Votes	%	Result
1969	François Tombalbaye	1,556,113	100%	Elected ✓

=== National Assembly elections ===
Election	Party leader	Votes	%	Seats	+/–	Position	Result
1957	François Tombalbaye	443,762 as part of Entente	83.4%	32 / 65	▲32	▲1st	Entente coalition government
1959	François Tombalbaye	390,377	68.7%	57 / 84	▲25	1st	Supermajority government
1962	François Tombalbaye	1,124,214	100%	85 / 85	▲28	1st	Sole legal party
1963	François Tombalbaye	1,352,749	99.9%	75 / 75	▼10	1st	Sole legal party
1969	François Tombalbaye	1,580,593	100%	101 / 101	▲26	1st	Sole legal party

==== Notes ====
Within the Entente, the Chadian Progressive Party won 32 seats, the Grouping of Rural and Independent Chadians won nine, the Democratic and Socialist Union of the Resistance won 7, Radicals and Radical Socialists won 7, the Independent Socialist Party of Chad won 1 in total the alliance won 57 seats.

== See also ==
- Bourkou Louise Kabo
- Hadjé Halimé
