= Grand Council of French Equatorial Africa =

Unicameral legislature of French Equatorial Africa

Grand Council of French Equatorial Africa Grand conseil de l'Afrique équatoriale française

Type
- Type: Unicameral

History
- Founded: 24 November 1947
- Disbanded: 1959

Leadership
- President: Paul Flandre (1947–1948, 1952–1957); Maurice Gérard (1949–1952); Barthélemy Boganda (1957–1959)

Structure
- Seats: 20
- Committees: Permanent Commission, First Commission (Finance, Budget and Administrative Affairs), Second Commission (Economic Affairs, Major Works, Roads, Labour and Social Security), Third Commission (Education, Health, Public Hygiene, Youth, Sports and Leisure), Fourth Commission (Plan of the Federation)

The Grand Council of French Equatorial Africa (French: Grand conseil de l'Afrique équatoriale française, abbreviated AEF Grand Council) was an interterritorial parliamentary assembly of French Equatorial Africa (AEF) that existed from 1947 to 1959. Based in Brazzaville, the AEF Grand Council was composed of members elected from the Representative Councils (later the Territorial Assemblies) of Gabon, Moyen-Congo, Oubangui-Chari, and Chad. Elections to the Grand Council of French Equatorial Africa were held in 1947, 1952 and 1957. Each of the four territories elected five Grand Councilors. Unlike the assemblies that elected the Grand Councilors, there were no separate quotas for Europeans and Africans for the seats in the Grand Council. The Grand Council oversaw budgetary matters in French Equatorial Africa and its territories. The French Gaullist Paul Flandre was the President of the Grand Council for its two first years, before being replaced by the French socialist Maurice Gérard. Flandre again held the Presidency of the Grand Council 1952-1957. During its final two years Barthélemy Boganda was the Grand Council President.

== Creation of the AEF Grand Council ==
Held in the midst of World War II, the January 20 – February 8, 1944 Brazzaville Conference outlined a restructuring of the French colonial system. After the war, the French Constitution of 27 October 1946 created the French Union – a community consisting of Metropolitan France, Overseas Departments, Overseas Territories as well as associated states and territories. The creation of Grand Councils for AEF and French West Africa (AOF) came about as a result of the dispositions of Article 78 of the Constitution as well as arising from advocacy from African members of the French parliament calling for greater influence for African representatives on budgetary matters. The Law 47-1629 of August 29, 1947 created the Grand Councils of AEF and AOF. The Law 47-1629 of August 29, 1947 outlined that the rules used to elect the AEF Grand Council and its functions. The AEF Grand Council would not given legislative powers but where given important functions in budget and oversight matters, most notably in regards to the Fonds d'Investissements pour le Developpement Economique et Social (FIDES, a body created in April 1946 in order to finance development projects within the French Union). The AEF Grand Council would have two sessions annually, and would be consulted on the general budget of AEF, customs duties and rebates and subsidies to local governments. The AEF Grand Council would become a key instrument for economical-financial solidarity between the four territories. The Governor-General of French Equatorial Africa would be responsible for the preliminary investigation of matters submitted to the Grand Council, and would also be responsible to ensure execution of its decisions or those of its standing committee. The AEF Grand Council was headquartered on Rue Liotard in Brazzaville, in a building on Place du gouvernement that formerly had housed the official printing press.

The AEF Grand Council would be elected by the respective assemblies of each of the four AEF territories, each assembly electing 5 AEF Grand Councillors among its ranks using list vote with highest average proportional representation electoral system. Grand Councillors would be re-electable. There would be no distinction between First College (Europeans) and Second College (Africans) in the election of the AEF Grand Council.

== First Grand Council of French Equatorial Africa (1947–1952) ==
=== First elections to the AEF Grand Council ===
The Chad Representative Council (elected in the 1946–47 Chadian Representative Council election) held its vote on AEF Grand Council members on October 21, 1947. Two lists were presented, a republican union list with André Kieffer (trader), Adoum Aganaye (teacher), Marc Dounia (nurse), Arabi El Goni (translator) and Markinzaye (Laï canton chief), and a second list with Marcel Lallia, Joseph Schaeffert and Eugène Sabin as its candidates. The republican union list got 15 votes, and won all five seats in the Grand Council. The list of Lallia, Schaeffert and Sabin got 4 votes, but the list was rejected by the Representative Council president over irregularities. There were also four blank votes. The election was a relative victory for the Chadian Progressive Party (PPT), as it got two seats (Dounia and Adoum Aganaye, albeit the latter soon broke away from PPT). Kieffer belonged to the Republican Union of Chad (URT), whilst Arabi El Goni and Markinzaye belonged to the Chadian Democratic Union (UDT).

The Gabon Representative Council (elected in the 1946–47 Gabon Representative Council election) elected Paul Flandre, Yves Evouna, Paul-Marie Gondjout, Édouard Mossot, Marcel Regnault as its AEF Grand Councillors.

The Moyen-Congo Representative Council (elected in the 1946–1947 Moyen-Congo Representative Council election) elected Maurice Gérard (SFIO), Jean Cazaban-Mazerolles (who became the AEF Federation secretary of SFIO in 1948), Stéphane Tchichelle (Congolese Progressive Party), Jean Malonga (Councillor of the Republic, Congolese Progressive Party) and Reverend Father Charles Lecomte (independent) as its Grand Councillors.

The Oubangui-Chari Representative Council (elected in the 1946 Oubangui-Chari Representative Council election) chose Jean Barbarin, Georges Darlan, Louis Martin Yetina, Bernard Condomat and Léon Gaume as its AEF Grand Councillors.

=== 1947 sessions ===
The first (extraordinary) session of the AEF Grand Council convened on November 24, 1947. 18 out of the 20 Grand Councillors were present (Gaume was in Metropolitan France at the time, whilst Evouna had not yet reached Brazzaville). A number of civilian and military dignitaries were in attendance at the opening ceremony. Jean Louis Marie André Soucadaux, the interim Governor-General of AEF, held the opening address. Soucaduax made sure to point out how much the new institutions established in the colonies since October 1946 owed to General Charles de Gaulle and his collaborators (such as Félix Éboué and André Bayardelle).

Barbarin was recognized as the doyen d'âge, and as such was tasked with presiding over the provisional bureau of the Grand Council. Yetina and Adoum Aganaye acted as the secretaries of the provisional bureau. The AEF General Government had called on the Grand Council to adopt the internal rules of the assembly, in response the Grand Council deliberated the organization of a rules committee for about 30 minutes. Kieffer suggested the rules committee be constituted by one member from each territory, whilst Flandre proposed that one European and one African member from each territory would constitute the rules committee. Flandre's proposal was adopted. The rules committee elected consisted of Lecomte and Tchichelle from Moyen-Congo, Regnault and Gondjout from Gabon, Kieffer and Adoum Aganaye from Chad, and Darlan and Yetina from Oubangui-Chari. The rules committee would deliberate the following day. On November 26, 1947 the Grand Council reviewed the proposed internal regulations, and voted on them. On November 27, 1947 one article of the internal regulations was rectified, following debate.

Elections to the Bureau, Permanent Commission and other Commissions were held on November 27, 1947, with 19 Grand Councillors present (Evouna had arrived by then). Flandre was the sole candidate for the post as President of the AEF Grand Council. He received 14 votes, 1 (null) vote was cast for Malonga and there were 4 blank votes. Barbarin, as doyen d'âge, declared Flandre elected. Two Vice Presidents were elected. Kieffer got 13 votes, against 6 blank votes. Darlan got 18 votes, against 1 blank vote. Gondjout (receiving 18 votes, against 1 blank) and Adoum Aganaye (19 votes) were elected as Secretaries.

The Permanent Commission was to be elected for a one-year period, with one full member and one alternate member from each territory. In the election to the Permanent Commission Regnault (13 votes), Yetina (19 votes), Tchichelle (13 votes) and Adoum Aganaye 19 votes were elected as full members. Reverend Father Lecomte, who got 6 votes, did not get elected (later in the session, the Grand Council unanimously elected Lecomte as the Syndic of the institution). Kieffer (14 votes), Barbarin (16 votes), Malonga (17 votes) and Mossot (19 votes) were elected as alternate members of the Permanent Commission.

There was a debate on the formation of thematic commissions. Three commissions were elected;

Commission		Members
First Commission	Finance, Budget and Administrative Affairs	Kieffer, Adoum Aganaye, Yetina, Regnault, Gondjout, Gérard
Second Commission	Economic Affairs, Major Works, Roads, Plan of the Federation, Labour and Social Security	Dounia, Kieffer, Barbarin, Condomat, Mossot, Evouna, Tchichelle, Cazaban-Mazerolles
Third Commission	Education, Health, Public Hygiene, Youth, Sports and Leisure	Adoum Aganaye, Darlan, Condomat, Evouna, Lecomte, Malonga

Deliberations of the extraordinary session continued on November 28, 1947. The closing session of the extraordinary session was held on November 29, 1947 at which the interim Governor General Soucadaux held a speech, paying hommage to General Philippe Leclerc de Hauteclocque.

The first extraordinary session was followed by an ordinary session of the Grand Council, held November 30 to December 19, 1947.

=== 1948 sessions ===
A second ordinary session of the AEF Grand Council was held April 20 to May 8, 1948. On April 20, 1947 the bureau was re-elected. Again Flandre was the sole candidate for President, he obtained 11 votes against 9 blank votes. Darlan (18 votes) and Kieffer (17 votes) were re-elected as Vice Presidents. Adoum Aganaye (18 votes) and Gondjout (17 votes) were re-elected as Secretaries. Reverend Father Lecomte was re-elected as Syndic (17 votes in favour, 2 blank and 1 null vote).

On April 21, 1948 the Grand Council decided to institute a fourth commission – for the Plan of the Federation. The memberships of the Commissions were revised as follows;

Commission	Members
First Commission	Cazaban-Mazerolles (chairman), Kieffer (rapporteur), Regnault, Gondjout, Darlan, Arabi El Goni
Second Commission	Barbarin (chairman), Mossot (rapporteur), Dounia, Markinzaye, Gaume, Tchichelle
Third Commission	Lecomte (chairman), Malonga (rapporteur), Yetina, Condomat, Evouna, Adoum Aganaye
Fourth (Planning) Commission	Kieffer (chairman), Gondjout (secretary), Darlan (rapporteur), Cazaban-Mazerolles, Malonga, Adoum Aganaye, Regnault, Gaume

The Grand Council was called in by the government for an extraordinary session on May 26, 1948, in order to revise decisions taken on May 7, 1948 on taxes and customs duties. Flandre, Kieffer and Lecomte were on holidays in Metropolitan France, whilst Arabi El Goni, Markinzaye, Mossot and Evouna were also absent. Darlan chaired the session.

A three-week budget session of the Grand Council was solemnly inaugurated by High-Commissioner of the Republic Bernard Cornut-Gentille on September 29, 1948. The session was convened to review the 1949 budget. The formation of a new electricity company, as a joint venture between the General Government of French Equatorial Africa and Électricité de France, was on the agenda. Kieffer was in Paris during the inauguration, whilst Gerard was in Metropolitan France for health reasons and would not join the session at all.

=== 1949 sessions ===
The Grand Council held an ordinary session between April 20 and May 9, 1949. Arabi El Goni, Condomat, Gaume, Malonga and Markinzaye were absent on the first day of the session. In the AEF Grand Council bureau elections, the socialists Gérard and Cazaban-Mazerolles stood as candidates against the Gaullist incumbents.

In the election for post as President of the Grand Council Flandre was challenged by Gérard. Gérard won the post obtaining 8 votes, against 7 votes for Flandre. There were four candidates for the post Vice Presidential posts – Gondjout (8 votes) and Regnault (9 votes) were elected as new vice presidents, whilst Adoum Aganaye got 7 votes and Kieffer 4 votes. For the post of Secretaries Yetina (13 votes) and Evouna (10 votes) were both elected. In the election for Syndic Cazaban-Mazerolles was elected with 7 votes, against 5 votes for Lecomte, 1 vote for Gérard and 2 blank votes.

In the first round of election to the new Permanent Commission Yetina got 11 votes (elected as the full member from Oubangui-Chari), Evouna 10 votes (elected as the full member from Gabon), Adoum Aganaye 9 votes (elected as the full member from Chad), Tchichelle 7 votes, Kieffer 6 votes and Mossot 4 votes. A second round of voting was held for the post as full member of the Permanent Commission from Moyen-Congo, Tchichelle again received 7 votes and was declared elected. In the election for the alternate members of the Permanent Commission, the Grand Council elected Darlan (10 votes), Gondjout (10 votes), Dounia (11 votes) and Cazaban-Mazerolles (9 votes). The Permanent Commission unanimously chose Adoum Aganaye to be its chairman and Yetina as its secretary.

The commissions were reorganized as follows;

Commission	Members
First Commission	Flandre, Gondjout, Cazaban-Mazerolles, Arabi El Goni
Second Commission	Kieffer, Mossot, Tchichelle, Regnault, Gaume, Dounia, Condomat
Third Commission	Lecomte, Yetina, Evouna, Adoum Aganaye, Barbarin, Malonga, Markinzaye
Fourth (Planning) Commission	Kieffer, Adoum Aganaye, Darlan, Barbarin, Cazaban-Mazerolles, Tchichelle, Flandre, Evouna

=== 1950 sessions ===
The AEF Grand Council held an ordinary session April 24 to May 13, 1950. General Governor Bernard Cornut-Gentille held the inaugural speech of the session on April 24, 1950. Flandre was absent on April 24, 1950. Gérard was re-elected as President of the Grand Council, with 14 votes against 5 blank or null votes. Kieffer and Gondjout were elected Vice President, both obtaining 14 votes against 5 blank or null votes. Yetina and Evouna were elected as Secretaries, Yetina obtaining 12 votes and Evouna 14 votes. There were no candidates for the post as Syndic, but Condomat was elected to the post by acclamation.

Adoum Aganaye (12 votes), Cazaban-Mazerolles (16 votes), Evouna (14 votes) and Yetina (10 votes) were elected as full members of the Permanent Commission. Darlan (17 votes), Dounia (18 votes), Mossot (17 votes) and Lecomte (16 votes) were elected as alternate members of the Permanent Commission. The Permanent Commission elected Yetina to be its chairman.

Commissions were elected as follows;

Commission	Members
First Commission	Flandre, Gondjout, Darlan, Arabi El Goni
Second Commission	Kieffer, Mossot, Tchichelle, Regnault, Gaume, Dounia, Condomat
Third Commission	Lecomte, Yetina, Evouna, Adoum Aganaye, Barbarin, Malonga, Markinzaye
Fourth (Planning) Commission	Kieffer, Adoum Aganaye, Darlan, Barbarin, Cazaban-Mazerolles, Tchichelle, Flandre, Evouna

A budget session was held October 30 to November 18, 1950, followed by an extraordinary session November 21–23, 1950.

=== 1951 sessions ===
The Grand Council held an ordinary session from April 30 to May 19, 1951. Darlan, Flandre, Gondjout, Malonga, Markinzaye and Tchichelle were absent when the session began. Gérard was re-elected President of the Grand Council with 11 votes. For the posts as Vice Presidents Kieffer (13 votes) and Evouna (10 votes) were elected, whilst Yetina got 3 votes. For the posts as Secretaries Mossot (13 votes) and Condomat (9 votes) were elected. Condomat was unanimously re-elected as Syndic.

There was no vote on election of Permanent Commission on April 30, 1951, the Grand Council postponed the vote until the report of the Permanent Commission had been heard. The Grand Council unanimously reelected the First Commission. In the election of Second and Third Commissions Barbarin and Mossot switched commission, which was approved unanimously. Kieffer, Evouna, Adoum Aganaye, Barbarin, Cazaban-Mazerolles, Darlan, Flandre and Tchichelle were unanimously elected to the Fourth (Planning) Commission.

On May 12, 1951 the Grand Council elected the Permanent Commission. 17 Grand Councillors took part in the vote. Adoum Aganaye (9 votes) was elected as the full member from Chad, Cazaban-Mazerolles (12 votes) was elected as the full member from Moyen-Congo, Condomat (12 votes) was elected as the full member from Oubangui-Chari, Mossot (12 votes) was elected as the full member from Gabon, whilst Dounia got 6 votes and Evouna 2 votes. In the election for alternate members of the Permanent Commission, all candidates were elected – Dounia (10 votes), Evouna (12 votes), Tchichelle (13 votes) and Yetina (9 votes).

The Grand Council held a budget session from August 20 to September 8, 1951, and an extraordinary session on September 11, 1951.

=== 1952 session ===
The first AEF Grand Council held its final, extraordinary session February 19–20, 1952. Governor General Paul Chauvet and Gérard spoke at the opening of the session. By this time Gaume and Barbarin had resigned from the Grand Council. Only nine Grand Councillors attended the February 19, 1952 meeting – Gérard, Kieffer, Condomat, Cazaban-Mazerolles, Adoum Aganaye, Arabi El Goni, Dounia, Regnault, Tchichelle and Yetina. Flandre and Evouna arrived for the February 20, 1952 sitting.

== Second Grand Council of French Equatorial Africa (1952–1957) ==
=== Second elections to the AEF Grand Council ===
Party strength in the Grand Council of French Equatorial Africa (1952)
Party	Seats
Rally of the French People (RPF)/Union	6
Chadian Democratic Union (UDT)	3
Movement for the Social Evolution of Black Africa (MESAN)	3
Congolese Progressive Party (PPC)	2
French Section of the Workers' International (SFIO)	1
Rally of Republican Lefts (RGR)	1
Independents	4

The Chad Territorial Assembly (elected in the 1952 Chad Territorial Assembly election) held a vote on April 27, 1952 to elect its AEF Grand Councillors. Two lists were presented, on one hand there was a Chadian Democratic Union (UDT)-Rally of the French People (RPF) list with Tardrew (RPF), Kieffer (RPF), Arabi El Goni (UDT), Jean Baptiste (UDT) and Djimadoumbaye Dono (UDT) as its candidates. On the other hand the Civic Action Front of Chad (FAC) fielded a list which included Ahmed Koulamallah and Ahmed Dallah as candidates. Before finalizing the candidatures ahead of the April 27, 1952 vote, lengthy negotiations had taken place. Gabriel Lisette had tried to secure at least one seat for FAC, but to no avail.

The UDT-RPF list got 38 votes against 6 votes for the FAC list. All five candidates of the UDT-RPF list were elected. After the vote FAC raised demand that the AEF Grand Council be abolished.

In the elections of Grand Councillors from the Gabon Territorial Assembly (elected in the 1952 Gabon Territorial Assembly election) there were three lists – the Union for the Defense of General Interests of Gabon List (or 'Flandre List', 12 votes, 2 seats), the Boukakad List (12 votes, 2 seats) and the Amogho List (10 votes, 1 seat). The Grand Councillors elected were Paul Flandre (General Director of ALFA and SAF, from Libreville, Union), Marcel Regnault (planter, forestry operator, from Libreville, Union), Jean-Jacques Boukakad (Primary school teacher in the Higher Common Education Framework, from Mouila, independent), Eugène Amogho (Administrative and Financial Services Clerk from Franceville, independent), Joumas Polycarpe (Head Nurse at Franceville Medical Centre, independent) and as its AEF Grand Councillors.

In the elections of Grand Councillors from the Moyen-Congo Territorial Assembly (elected in the 1952 Moyen-Congo Territorial Assembly election) there were three lists – the Congolese Union list (21 votes, 3 seats), the RPF list (7 votes, 1 seat) and the List for Defense of Social and Economic Interests (socialist-oriented, 7 votes, 1 seat). The Grand Councillors elected were Jean Félix-Tchicaya (deputy of the French National Assembly, accountant, from Kouilou, PPC), Dr. René Grosperrin (surgeon, Lt.Col. in the reserve, Brazzaville, RPF), Pierre Istre (public works engineer, Brazzaville, RGR), Mathurin Menga (scribe-accountant at CFCO, from Bikouala Moussaka, SFIO) and Stéphane Tchichelle (deputy head of the Point-Noire railway station, PPC) as its Grand Councillors.

The Oubangui-Chari Territorial Assembly (elected in the 1952 Oubangui-Chari Territorial Assembly election) there were three lists – the list of MESAN, the list of the Union for the Defense of Oubanguian Interests and an independent list. The Grand Councillors elected were Barthélemy Boganda (member of the French National Assembly, planter, from Mbaïki, MESAN), Etienne Gambu (chairman of the Bangui Chamber of Commerce, Union for the Defense of Oubanguian Interest/RPF), Etienne Kabylo (Assistant primary school teacher in private education, from Bossembélé, MESAN), Maurice Pangane (planter, from Bambari, MESAN) and Jean-Baptiste Songomali (accountant at Cotonaf, president of Transcoop, from Bangui, independent) as its Grand Councillors.

=== 1952 sessions ===
The newly-elected second Grand Council held its first, ordinary session June 9–27, 1952. Governor General Chauvet and Paul Flandre, as doyen d'âge, held opening speeches. 19 of the 20 recently-elected Grand Councillors were in attendance, Regnault was absent.

Elections for bureau and Permanent Commission were held on June 10, 1952. Flandre was the sole candidate for the post of President of the AEF Grand Council, he was elected with 15 votes against 4 blank votes. There were three candidates for three Vice Presidential posts. In the first round of voting Kieffer got 16 votes, Istre 9 votes and Menga 9 votes. Kieffer was elected in the first round, whilst Istre and Menga faced each other in a second round. Menga got 10 votes against 9 votes for Istre, Menga was declared elected. For the election of the two Secretaries Kabylo and Pangane were both elected with 17 votes each. Tchichelle was elected as the Syndic with 17 votes.

In the election to Permanent Commission Baptiste (19 votes), Boukakad (19 votes), Songomali (19 votes) and Grosperrin (10 votes) were elected as full members. Tchichelle, who got 9 votes, was not elected. In the election for alternate members of the Permanent Commission Djimadoumbaye Dono (16 votes), Menga (14 vote), Amogho (19 votes) and Gambu (16 votes) were elected. The Permanent Commission unanimously chose Songomali as its chairman.

Elections for commissions were held on June 11, 1952. The first and third commissions were elected unanimously, whilst there was one abstention in the elections of the second and fourth commissions. The commissions were constituted as follows;

Commission	Members
First Commission	Istre (chairman), Kieffer (rapporteur), Arabi El Goni, Félix-Tchicaya, Gambu, Boganda, Boukakad, Regnault
Second Commission	Tardrew (chairman), Menga (rapporteur), Djimadoumbaye Dono, Tardrew, Tchichelle, Pangane, Songomali, Amogho
Third Commission	Grosperrin (chairman), Joumas (rapporteur), Baptise, Arabi El Goni, Félix-Tchicaya, Kabylo
Fourth (Planning) Commission	Kieffer (chairman), Istre (rapporteur), Félix-Tchicaya, Baptiste, Boganda, Songomali, Amogho, Boukakad

The AEF Grand Council held a budget session September 30 to October 20, 1952, and an extraordinary session October 20–22, 1952.

=== 1953 sessions ===
An extraordinary session was held March 9–14, 1953. An ordinary session was held June 3–19, 1953. Elections were held on June 4, 1953, with Boganda, Djimadoumbaye Dono, Félix-Tchicaya and Gambu absent. Flandre was re-elected as President of the AEF Grand Council, with 14 votes, 1 blank and 1 null. Kieffer, Menga, Kabylo and Pangane were re-elected as Vice Presidents and Secretaries respectively, all having received 16 votes each. Tchichelle was re-elected as Syndic with 15 votes against 1 blank vote.

The full members of the Permanent Commission were elected as follows – Amogho, Djimadoumbaye Dono, Grosperrin and Songomali (all having received 16 votes). The alternate members of the Permanent Commission elected were Baptiste (15 votes), Boukakad (16 votes), Gambu (16 votes) and Tchichelle (16 votes). The commissions were maintained as in 1952, except that Tardrew and Arabi El Goni switched between the First and Second Commissions.

A budget session was held September 30 to October 20, 1953, and an extraordinary session October 20–23, 1953.

=== 1954 sessions ===
The AEF Grand Council held an ordinary session May 29 to June 10, 1954. Elections were held on May 31, 1954. Boganda, Djima, Félix-Tchicaya and Regnault were absent. Boukakad had resigned from the AEF Grand Council, and was replaced by Evouna. Flandre was re-elected President of the AEF Grand Council with 15 votes against 1 blank vote. Likewise the other members of the bureau were all re-elected, Vice Presidents Kieffer (14 votes) and Menga (15 votes), Secretaries Pangane (16 votes) and Kabylo (15 votes), and Syndic Tchichelle (15 votes).

The full members of the Permanent Commission were all elected with 16 votes each – Amogho, Grosperrin, Songomali, Baptiste. Likewise the alternate members of the Permanent Commission all got 16 votes each – Evouna, Tchichelle, Gambu and Arabi El Goni. The First Commission was constituted by Istre (chairman), Kieffer (rapporteur), Gambu (deputy rapporteur), Boganda, Evouna, Félix-Tchicaya and Tardrew. Evouna replaced Boukakad in the Second and Fourth Commissions.

A budget session was held October 30 to November 18, 1954.

=== 1955 sessions ===
An ordinary session was held May 27 to June 10, 1955. Elections were held on the first day of the session, with Boganda and Regnault absent. Roger Guérillot replaced Gambu as AEF Grand Councillor. Flandre again re-elected as President of the AEF Grand Council, with 16 votes in favour against 2 blank votes. Other bureau members were also re-elected – Kieffer with 18 votes as Vice President, Menga with 14 votes as Vice President, Kabylo with 16 votes as Secretary, Pangane with 16 votes as Secretary and Tchichelle with 18 votes as Syndic.

In the election for full members of the Permanent Commission, Amogho (18 votes), Grosperrin (15 votes), Songomali (16 votes) and Kieffer (14 votes) were elected. Menga, who obtained 3 votes, was unsuccessful. In the election of alternate members of Permanent Commission, Evouna (18 votes), Tchichelle (18 votes), Guérillot (17 votes) and Arabi El Goni (15 votes) were elected. The Grand Council approved that Guérillot replace Gambu as deputy rapporteur of the First Commission.

== Third AEF Grand Council (1957–1959) ==
Ahead of the March 31, 1957 Chad Territorial Assembly election, a political alliance known as the 'Entente for the Application of Reform Act' (Entente pour l'Application de la Loi Cadre) had been formed. The Entente won the elections in 8 out of 11 constituencies. On May 12, 1957 the Entente coordination committee held a meeting to agree on the distribution of posts in the Chad Territorial Assembly bureau and the election of AEF Grand Councillors. On May 13, 1957 the Chad Territorial Assembly elected their AEF Grand Councillors, a sole Entente list was presented. The Entente list got 61 votes, against 3 blank votes. The AEF Grand Councillors elected from Chad were François Tombalbaye (trade unionist), Ahmed Kotoko, Jacques Hublot, Ahmed Mangue and Mahamat Hassan. Two of them belonged to PPT and 2 from UDSR. Mahamat Hassan was a UDIT politician, elected to the Chad Territorial Assembly on a Entente list from Guera.

The Gabon Territorial Assembly (elected in the 1957 Gabon Territorial Assembly election) chose three Gabonese Democratic Bloc (BDG) members – Vincent de Paul Nyonda, Maurice Sossa Simawango and Charles Bakissy – and two Gabonese Democratic and Social Union (UDSG) members – Eugène Amogho and Jean-Félix M'Bah -, as their AEF Grand Councillors.

The 1957 Oubangui-Chari Territorial Assembly election had a landslide victory for Boganda's Movement for the Social Evolution of Black Africa (MESAN). The Oubangui-Chari Territorial Assembly elected Boganda, René Chambellant, Albert Fayama, Antoine Darlan and Étienne Ngounio as its AEF Grand Councillors.

The Moyen-Congo Territorial Assembly (elected in the 1957 Moyen-Congo Territorial Assembly election) chose Simon-Pierre Kikhounga-Ngot, Jacques Abele, Edouard Langevin, Apollinaire Bazinga and Marcel Ibalico as its AEF Grand Councillors.

Ahead of the gathering of the third AEF Grand Council, Gabriel Lisette had come to Brazzaville from Paris, in order to try to convince Fulbert Youlou to affiliated his UDDIA party to the African Democratic Rally (RDA). Elections in the Grand Council were held on June 17, 1957. Boganda was elected President of the AEF Grand Council, with 19 votes in favour against 1 abstention. Per Thompson (1960) "Boganda's overwhelming success in this election was probably traceable to the inability of the [African Democratic Rally (RDA)] and [African Socialist Movement (MSA)] members of the Grand Council to agree upon sponsoring one of their number, so that they swung their votes to a neutral candidate".

Tombalaye was elected Vice President with 17 votes, Ibalico was also elected Vice President. Ngounio and Mahamat Hassan were elected as Secretaries. Kotoko and Abele were elected as quaestors. Simawango would become the chairman of the Permanent Commission. Mangue was amongst the Grand Councillors elected to the Permanent Commission. Darlan would chair the First (Finance) Commission, Ibalico would chair the Second (Economic Affairs) Commission, Ahmed Mangue would chair the Third (Social Affairs) Commission and Amogho would chair the Fourth (Planning) Commission.

On September 19, 1957 Antoine Darlan was expelled from the MESAN party.

Lisette returned to Brazzaville in February 1958, after a stay in Paris. He sought to conquer the AEF Grand Council for the RDA. He had managed to get Youlou to unite the UDDIA party into RDA ranks, but Boganda refused to join his MESAN party into RDA. Ahead of the March 1958 session RDA held 11 out of the 20 seats in AEF Grand Council. The RDA fielded Kotoko as its candidate for the AEF Grand Council Presidency. On March 25, 1958 Boganda managed to get re-elected as AEF Grand Council President with 10 votes. Mangue was absent from the session, attending a Congress of African Physicians in Dakar. Mahamat Hassan broke with RDA discipline and voted for Boganda. Tombalaye was removed from the post as AEF Grand Council Vice President, whilst Mangue maintained his post in the Permanent Commission.

The new bureau consisted of Boganda as President, Bazinga and Mahamat Hassan as Vice Presidents, M'Bah and Ngounio as Secretaries, Langevin as Quaestor and Chambellant as Deputy Quaestor. Simawango remained as the chairman of the Permanent Commission. Boganda would remain as the AEF Grand Council President until his death in 1959.

== List of Grand Councillors of French Equatorial Africa ==
Territory	1947–1952	1952–1957	1957–1959
Gabon	Paul Flandre		Charles Bakissy
Gabon	Yves Evouna	Jean-Jacques Boukakad (resigned, replaced by Evouna by 1954)	Jean Félix M'Bah
Gabon	Paul-Marie Gondjout	Eugène Amogho	
Gabon	Édouard Mossot	Polycarpe Joumas	Vincent de Paul Nyonda
Gabon	Marcel Regnault		Maurice Sossa Simawango
Moyen-Congo	Maurice Gérard	Jean Félix-Tchicaya	Simon-Pierre Kikhounga-Ngot
Moyen-Congo	Jean Cazaban-Mazerolles	René Grosperrin	Jacques Abele
Moyen-Congo	Charles Lecomte	Pierre Istre	Edouard Langevin
Moyen-Congo	Jean Malonga	Mathurin Menga	Apollinaire Bazinga
Moyen-Congo	Stéphane Tchichelle		Marcel Ibalico
Oubangui-Chari	Charles-Jean Barbarin	Barthélemy Boganda	
Oubangui-Chari	Louis Martin Yetina	Etienne Gambu (resigned, replaced by Roger Guérillot in 1955)	René Chambellant
Oubangui-Chari	Bernard Condomat	Etienne Kabylo	Albert Fayama
Oubangui-Chari	Georges Darlan	Maurice Pangane	Antoine Darlan
Oubangui-Chari	Léon Gaume	Jean-Baptiste Songomali	Étienne Ngounio
Chad	Arabi El Goni		Ahmed Mangué
Chad	Marc Dounia	Jean Baptiste	Ahmed Kotoko
Chad	Adoum Aganaye	Djimadoumbaye Dono	François Tombalbaye
Chad	André Kieffer		Jacques Hublot
Chad	Markinzaye	William Tardrew	Mahamat Hassan
