= 1956 French legislative election in Gabon–Moyen Congo =

Elections to the French National Assembly were held in French Gabon and French Congo on 2 January 1956.

== Results ==
=== First college ===
Candidate	Party	Votes	%
Maurice Bayrou	Rally of the French People	2,939	48.55
Charles Noel		1,529	25.26
Raphael Dulos		805	13.30
Pierre Regnier		660	10.90
Pierre Istre		120	1.98
Total		6,053	100.00
Valid votes		6,053	93.70
Invalid/blank votes		407	6.30
Total votes		6,460	100.00
Registered voters/turnout		11,545	55.95
Source: Sternberger et al.

=== Second college: Gabon ===
Candidate	Party	Votes	%
Jean-Hilaire Aubame	Independent	26,712	46.84
Léon M'ba	Gabonese Democratic Bloc	19,336	33.91
Vincent de Paul Nyonda		7,722	13.54
Jean-Claude Brouillet		2,176	3.82
Louis Bigmann		1,083	1.90
Total		57,029	100.00
Valid votes		57,029	98.37
Invalid/blank votes		946	1.63
Total votes		57,975	100.00
Registered voters/turnout		120,901	47.95
Source: Sternberger et al.

=== Second College: Moyen Congo ===
Candidate	Party	Votes	%
Félix Tchicaya	Congolese Progressive Party	45,976	31.06
Jacques Opangault	French Section of the Workers' International	43,193	29.18
Fulbert Youlou		41,084	27.75
Simon-Pierre Kikhounga-Ngot		8,864	5.99
Stéphane Tchichelle		4,746	3.21
Five other candidates		4,168	2.82
Total		148,031	100.00
Valid votes		148,031	95.90
Invalid/blank votes		6,332	4.10
Total votes		154,363	100.00
Registered voters/turnout		233,544	66.10
