= 1951 French legislative election in Gabon–Moyen Congo =

Elections to the French National Assembly were held in French Gabon and French Congo on 17 June 1951.

== Results ==
=== First college ===
Candidate	Party	Votes	%
Maurice Bayrou	Rally of the French People	3,698	70.22
Jean Ceccaldi		1,405	26.68
Victor Martin		163	3.10
Total		5,266	100.00
Valid votes		5,266	97.75
Invalid/blank votes		121	2.25
Total votes		5,387	100.00
Registered voters/turnout		9,400	57.31
Source: Sternberger et al.

=== Second college: Gabon ===
Candidate	Party	Votes	%
Jean-Hilaire Aubame	French Section of the Workers' International	17,329	59.14
Louis Bigmann	Rally of the French People	5,514	18.82
Léon M'ba	African Democratic Rally	3,257	11.11
Henri Fauvette		1,848	6.31
Casimir Degalat		921	3.14
André Schneider		434	1.48
Total		29,303	100.00
Valid votes		29,303	99.24
Invalid/blank votes		223	0.76
Total votes		29,526	100.00
Registered voters/turnout		70,643	41.80
Source: Sternberger et al.

=== Second College: Moyen Congo ===
Candidate	Party	Votes	%
Félix Tchicaya	Congolese Progressive Party	23,213	49.99
Jacques Opangault	French Section of the Workers' International	13,176	28.38
Hyacinthe Sambat-Dehlot	Rally of the French People	9,048	19.49
Two other candidates		997	2.15
Total		46,434	100.00
Valid votes		46,434	86.87
Invalid/blank votes		7,018	13.13
Total votes		53,452	100.00
Registered voters/turnout		118,523	45.10
Source: Sternberger et al.
