= Pierre Istre =

French engineer and radical politician

Pierre Julien Henri Istre was a French engineer and radical politician. Istre served as a First Class Engineer of the General Cadre of Public Works of Overseas France. He belonged to the Rally of Republican Lefts (RGR). He was elected from the First College (Europeans) to the Moyen-Congo Territorial Assembly in the 1952 election. He was subsequently elected to represent Moyen-Congo in the Grand Council of French Equatorial Africa. In April 1954 Istre was put forth by Jean Félix-Tchicaya as candidate for the presidency of the Moyen-Congo Territorial Assembly. But there was a rift in Félix-Tchicaya's party (the Congolese Progressive Party, PPC), and Pierre Goura defeated Istre with support from PPC dissidents.

Istre contested the 1956 French National Assembly election, as a candidate for the First College in Gabon and Moyen-Congo. He obtained 120 votes (2% of the votes cast).
