= René Grosperrin =

Dr. René Désiré Prosper Grosperrin was a French surgeon and politician. He was born on July 29, 1906 in Lons-le-Saunier. He was the son of Ulysse Grosperrin (officier) and Berthe Grosperrin (née Marchand). René Grosperrin studied at the Lycée of Lons-le-Saunier and the Prytanée national militaire in La Flèche. He went on to study at the Military Medical Academy at Lyon-Bron and the Paris Medical Faculty, obtaining university degree. He married Marie-Georgette Casteuble on August 13, 1929, the couple who have one daughter.

Dr. Grosperrin served as Extern of the Hospitals of Paris, Head of Urological Clinic of the Faculty of Marseille and, as of 1932, Assistant of Surgery of the Colonial Hospitals in Togo. He arrived in Brazzaville in 1938. He would hold the military rank as Lieutenant Colonel. He later entered into the military reserve, and would serve as Chief Surgeon of the Brazzaville General Hospital.

Dr. Grosperrin joined the Rally of the French People (RPF) as the party was founded, and became a major figure of the political movement in Congo. On January 16, 1950 a by-election for a First College (Europeans) seat in the Moyen-Congo Representative Council was held, after the resignation of independent deputy Balme. There were 2,900 eligible voters. Dr. Grosperrin won the by-election with a wide margin, with 741 votes (87%), against 67 votes for Bessières (socialist-leaning republican) and 41 votes for Depuytorac (independent).

In April 1950 Dr. Grosperrin was named the RPF delegate general for French Equatorial Africa. In particular the RPF party leadership tasked Dr. Grosperrin to reorganize the Brazzaville RPF committee which had been ridden by internal tensions. Within the party Dr. Grosperrin became widely perceived as General Charles de Gaulle's personal representative in French Equatorial Africa.

Dr. Grosperrin headed the joint RPF-RGR list for the First College seats in the 1952 Moyen-Congo Territorial Assembly election. Dr. Grosperrin was elected to the Territorial Assembly. Subsequently he was elected by the Territorial Assembly as one of the five Grand Councillors of French Equatorial Africa for Moyen-Congo.

Dr. Grosperrin was awarded the Officer of Legion of Honour, the Resistance Medal, Officer of the Order of the Black Star, Medal of the Free French Forces and the Colonial Medal. As of the early 1960s he practiced medicine at a clinic on Colonna-d'Ornano Avenue in Brazzaville, and lived on Faidherbe Boulevard. He was a member of the Lions Club. Dr. Grosperrin died in Penne-d'Agenais on August 22, 1974.
