= Darlan =

Darlan is a surname, and may refer to:

- Antoine Darlan (1915–1974), Central African politician and trade unionist
- Éva Darlan (born 1948), French actress and film director
- François Darlan (1881–1942), French admiral and political figure
- Danièle Darlan (born 1952), Central African judge
- Georges Darlan (1920–1965), Central African politician
- Jean-Baptiste Darlan (1848–1912), French politician
- Thierry Darlan (born 2004), Central African basketball player

== See also ==
- Darlan (disambiguation)
