= Charles Lecomte =

French Catholic priest (1912–1985)

Lecomte, c. 1948

Charles Lecomte CSSp (1912–1985) was a French Catholic priest and politician. Lecomte was a missionary in Moyen-Congo between 1937 and 1951. He played an important role in the political, cultural, and sporting life of the colony. He was the foremost organizer of the construction project of the Basilica of Sainte-Anne-du-Congo in Brazzaville and the Eboue Stadium. In 1946-1947 he was elected to the Moyen-Congo Representative Council and the Grand Council of French Equatorial Africa. In 1951, he left Moyen-Congo and returned to civilian life.

== Biography ==
Lecomte was born in Pontorson in Normandy in 1912 and professed his vows in the Congregation of the Holy Spirit in 1932. He was trained as a specialist in youth work and gained significant experience in youth work in parishes in France before being ordained a priest at Séminaire des Missions de Chevilly-Larue on November 3, 1936.

Lecomte was assigned to the Vicariate of Brazzaville, and arrived in Moyen-Congo in November 1937. He would emerge as one of the more remarkable characters of the Catholic church in Moyen-Congo, having an impact in the sporting, cultural, and political life in Brazzaville. Initially he was sent to Makoua, where he spent his first years in Moyen-Congo. Having experience in youth work, Lecomte was appointed as the director of the sports organization of the Catholic Mission, the Fedération Athletique Congolaise. In the sporting life in Moyen-Congo, Lecomte would often act as mediator between African players and the European management bodies. In 1940, he was called to Brazzaville, to work among the Bangala people. He organized a Scouts de France unit in Brazzaville and a children's choir.

In the 1940s, Lecomte became initiator and organizer of a major construction project, building a church-rectory-stadium complex at the junction of La Plaine and Poto-Poto districts. Father Nicolas Moysan delegated to Lecomte to select an architect for a church building for the newly created Sainte-Anne-du-Congo parish. Soon thereafter French architect Roger Erell was contracted to design the Basilica of Sainte-Anne-du-Congo. Construction began in 1943. Errel also designed the large stadium adjacent to the church, a project co-financed by state and church funds. Per Liturgical Arts (1957), "[t]he entire project constitutes a harmonious human ensemble". The construction endeavor was massive in scope, and often difficult to manage. In connection with the 1944 Brazzaville Conference, the Eboué Stadium was inaugurated by General Charles de Gaulle. In 1944, Lecomte and Father Nicolas Moysan moved to the provisional presbytery of the newly created parish of Sainte-Anne-du-Congo.

The Vicariate decided to field both Lecomte and his local protege Fulbert Youlou as candidates in the 1946–1947 Moyen-Congo Representative Council election. Lecomte easily won one of the European college seats in the Moyen-Congo Representative Council, whilst Youlou was defeated in the African college election in Pool. In 1947, Lecomte was elected to the Grand Council of French Equatorial Africa. Lecomte had contested elections as an independent candidate, but was affiliated with the Rally of the French People. Around this time, he resided at the bishopric of Brazzaville and served as vicar general to bishop Paul Biéchy. By mid-1949, as the Congolese Progressive Party (PPC) underwent divisions over events in French West Africa and its alliance with the French Communist Party, Lecomte and Youlou sought to organize PPC dissidents to counter communist influence.

Lecomte left Moyen-Congo in 1951, a few months before the end of his political mandates. The Apostolic Delegate for French Africa Marcel Lefebvre had called on Lecomte to leave the Vicariate of Brazzaville. Lecomte returned home to Metropolitan France, and shortly thereafter he renounced his priesthood. He maintained contacts with friends in Congo and former confreres for some time and briefly returned to Congo in 1960 at the invitation of Youlou. Lecomte died in early 1985.
