= René Chambellant =

French dental surgeon (1907–1993)

René Chambellant

René Chambellant (Note: French pronunciation: [ʁene ʃɑ̃bɛlɑ̃].) (6 March 1907 – 1 September 1993) was a French dental surgeon, politician and neo-Gnostic patriarch. He was a leading figure of the neo-Gnostic movement in France in the immediate aftermath of World War II. In Oubangui-Chari, he was active in parliamentary politics in the 1950s. He was a member of parliament in the first legislature of the Central African Republic.

== Patriach ==
Chambellant was born in Reims, France. In 1945 Chambellant became the leader of the Universal Gnostic Church, becoming its Patriarch with the church name of 'Tau Renatus'. He succeeded Constant Chevillon, who had been killed in 1944. Chambellant played a key role in reviving the Order of Knight-Masons Elect Priests of the Universe after World War II, together with Robert Ambelain, Robert Amadou and Georges Lagrèze.

Around the period of Chambellant's consecration at Patriarch, the Holy Synod of the Gnostic Church resolved to provisionally place the church in a state of dormancy. Chamebellant moved to Central Africa, to teach dental surgery and dentistry there. He held the church titles of Primate of Africa and Bishop of Montségur (a role retained as the nominal Patriarch of the Gnostic Church). In 1948 Chambellant abdicated as Patriarch, and was succeeded by Henri-Charles Dupont (Tau Henri-Charles).

A dental surgeon by profession, he worked at the dentistry section of the Bangui Hospital until 1954. He was a bishop of the Apostolic Gnostic Church in Central Africa.

== Politics in Central Africa ==
Chambellant was elected to the Oubangui-Chari Territorial Assembly in the 1952 election, representing the First College (Europeans). He was recruited by Barthélemy Boganda to contest the November 1953 election for the French Union Assembly on the Movement for the Social Evolution of Black Africa (MESAN) together with Antoine Darlan. In 1955 he took part in founding the Oubanguien Liberal Intergroup (ILO, a party that connected the French elite in the territory with MESAN). On November 18, 1956 he was elected to the Bangui Municipal Council, as candidate of MESAN.

Chambellant was re-elected to Territorial Assembly in the March 31, 1957 election, standing as a MESAN candidate in the Ouham-Pendé constituency. He was subsequently elected as one of the representatives of Oubangui-Chari in the Grand Council of French Equatorial Africa. Standing as a MESAN candidate in the First Constituency, Chambellat was elected to the Legislative Assembly (later becoming the first National Assembly of the Central African Republic) in the April 1959 election. He would serve as the vice president of the Social Affairs Commission of the Legislative Assembly. On March 1, 1960 he was awarded the title of Knight of the Order of Central African Merit. His parliamentary mandate ended on April 1, 1964.

== Later years ==
Chambellant returned to France in the early 1980s. He remained active in neo-Gnosticism, and some sectors of the movement considered Chambellant to be the Patriarch. Chambellant maintained contacts with the successive North American Primates Roger Saint Victor-Hérard (Tau Charles) and Robert Cokinis (Tau Charles Harmonius II). Cokinis helped Chambellant to organizing the Order of Knight-Masons Elect Priests of the Universe in Canada, whilst Chambellant assisted Cokinis in organizing the Ecumenical Gnostic College of Métropolitains. Chambellant died in Nice on 1 September 1993.
