= Etienne Gambu =

Etienne Marie Théophile Gambu (1904-1979) was a French businessman, active in Oubangui-Chari and the Republic of the Congo. He was born on November 14, 1904 in Rouen. He was the son of Henri Gambu and Antoinette Gambu (née Geniaux). He studied at Pensionnat Jean-Baptiste-de-La-Salle in Rouen and the Caen Law Faculty. He married Georgette Vallin on October 3, 1936, the couple would have one son and one daughter.

Gambu served as the director of the Banque commerciale africaine in Bangui (Oubangui-Chari). In August 1940 Gambu joined the Free French Forces in French Equatorial Africa, and was assigned to the unit of General Philippe Leclerc de Hauteclocque. Gambu returned to Oubangui-Chari after the war. He worked as Director of Société de gérances industrielles et agricoles (SGIA). He was a member of the Chamber of Commerce of Bangui, and served as its chairman 1952-1953.

Gambu was elected to the Oubangui-Chari Territorial Assembly in the March 1952 election, standing as a Union for Defense of Oubanguian Interests candidate in First College (Europeans). He was elected to the Grand Council of French Equatorial Africa in April 1952.

Gambu resigned from his parliamentary functions on April 8, 1955. A by-election to fill his Territorial Assembly seat was held on June 26, 1955, in which Jacques Regnier was elected. He was replaced on the Grand Council of French Equatorial Africa by Roger Guérillot.

As of the early 1960s he worked as the director of the BCA branch in Brazzaville. He was a recipient of Knight of the Order of the Black Star. He was a member of Cercle de la France d'Outre-Mer. His hobbies included hockey and tennis. Gambu died on January 18, 1979 in Sotteville-lès-Rouen.
