= André Kieffer =

French businessman and politician

André Jean Kieffer

Member of the Grand Council of French Equatorial Africa
- In office 1947–1957

Member of the Territorial Assembly of Chad
- In office 1947–1957
- Constituency: South

Personal details
- Born: 22 May 1903 Saint-Mandé, France
- Died: 5 June 1984 (aged 81) Nice, France
- Party: RPF; UDIT

Military service
- Allegiance: Free France
- Years of service: 1940–1945
- Rank: Sub-lieutenant
- Unit: 1st Free French Division
- Battles/wars: World War II; Battle of Bir Hakeim

André Jean Kieffer (22 May 1903 – 5 June 1984) was a French businessman and politician in Chad. For a decade, in years between World War II and Chadian independence, Kieffer was a notable and controversial figure in parliamentary politics in the territory. He was a member of the Chad Representative Council (1947–1952), the Chad Territorial Assembly (1952–1957) and the Grand Council of French Equatorial Africa (1947–1957). A staunch advocate for the interests of cotton growers, Kieffer was often viewed as a "one-man party".

== Biography ==
Kieffer was born in the Paris suburb of Saint-Mandé on 22 May 1903. He joined the Free French Forces in French Equatorial Africa in August 1940, serving in the 1st Free French Division and reaching the rank of Sub-lieutenant. Kieffer took part in the Battle of Bir Hakeim. After the war, Kieffer lived in Fort-Lamy (now N'Djamena, capital of Chad) and was the director of the company SAIMA.

Kieffer stood as a candidate of the Republican Union of Chad (URT) in the 1946 Chad Representative Council election, for a seat in the Second Constituency (South-West) of the First College (Europeans). He failed to get elected in the first round, obtaining 163 votes. In the second round, held 12 January 1947, he was elected with 170 votes. In both rounds he was the most voted URT candidate in the constituency, and the sole deputy elected from the URT list in the Second Constituency of the First College. Kieffer was one of the most active First College deputies in the Representative Council. He gained a degree of popularity for his critiques of the French administration. On 21 October 1947 the Chad Representative Council elected him as one of its five representatives on the Grand Council of French Equatorial Africa.

In politics Kieffer was noted as an advocate for the cause of the cotton growers in Chad. Kieffer stood for re-election in the 1952 Chad Territorial Assembly election, being one of the candidates of the Rally of the French People (RPF) in the South Constituency of the First College. Kieffer was elected to the Territorial Assembly. He was one of six European assembly deputies that broke with the RPF after the elections.

Kieffer became known as a "one-man party". According to Virginia Thompson McLean (1960) "[t]he outstanding Independent in the new assembly was a long-time European resident of Tchad, André Kieffer, who was a passionate defender of the Tchadian cotton grower, and a thorn in the flesh of the [Chadian Social Action (AST)], the local administration, and Lisette." Thompson also referred to Kieffer as "a rugged individualist and easily the most aggressive and controversial figure of the 1952 assembly". In the Territorial Assembly he frequently castigated the French authorities and the Gaullist assembly majority. He tried to challenged the monopoly of the AST majority on issues like the assembly presidency and chairmanship of key commissions. Kieffer demanded an investigation into the April 1952 Bébalem massacre.

He was re-elected to the Grand Council of French Equatorial Africa on 27 April 1952. Per Thompson (1960), "A. Kieffer, almost single-handed, fought the good fight for Tchad's cotton growers in the Grand Council, and though he was not devoid of political ambitions, he was obviously sincere in his championing of the local underdog."

Around the time of the October 1953 election of a representative to the French Union Assembly, Kieffer supported the candidature of former governor Jacques Rogué. Kieffer joined the Independent Democratic Union of Chad (UDIT), a party led by Jean Baptiste (a mulatto and merchant) and Rogué. Ahead of the 1956 French legislative election, Kieffer and Jean Baptiste stood as candidates on the list of UDIT in the Second College (Africans). The UDIT list got 19,483 votes. The UDIT list had strong backing in the Ouaddaï and Batha regions, and less so in Kanem, Chari-Baguirmi and Mayo-Kebbi regions.

Over time Kieffer's attacks on the assembly majority and the French administration became more fierce. He denounced the assembly president William Tardrew of being 'dictatorial'. Kieffer accused the French administration of engineering electoral fraud. He accused the administration of exerting political pressure on up-country officials and assembly members. He accused AST politicians of involvement in a financial scandal. At times the speeches of Kieffer in the assembly prompted officials to leave in the hall in protest, twice the secretary-general Baptiste Bergerol abandoned the assembly hall in reaction to Kieffer's speeches. In March 1955 the Governor General Ignace Colombani quietly exited the venue the hall before Kieffer had opportunity to respond to the governor's inaugural speech.

Kieffer contested the 1957 Territorial Assembly election, in which there were no longer separate electoral colleges of Europeans and Africans (following legislation from December 1955). He used a jeep to tour the constituency he contested, playing military music and his own speeches translated into local languages. His attempt to get re-elected failed.

Kieffer withdrew from politics after the 1957 elections. After the elections, he was replaced on the board of the Cotton Support Fund by François Tombalbaye (PPT) and on the Administrative Council of Cotonfran by Alfred Pfirman (PPT). Kieffer died in Nice on 5 June 1984.
