= Darlan (disambiguation) =

François Darlan (1881–1942) was a French admiral and political figure.

Darlan may also refer to:

== Given name ==
- Darlan Cunha (born 1985), Brazilian actor
- Darlan Romani (born 1991), Brazilian shot putter
- Darlan (footballer, born 1994), Darlan Bispo Damasceno, Brazilian football midfielder for Louletano
- Darlan (footballer, born 1998), Darlan Pereira Mendes, Brazilian football midfielder for Grêmio

== Surname ==
- Darlan

== Other uses ==
- Darlan (horse) (2007-2013), British thoroughbred racehorse
