= Barthélemy Boganda =

Premier of the Central African Republic from 1958 to 1959

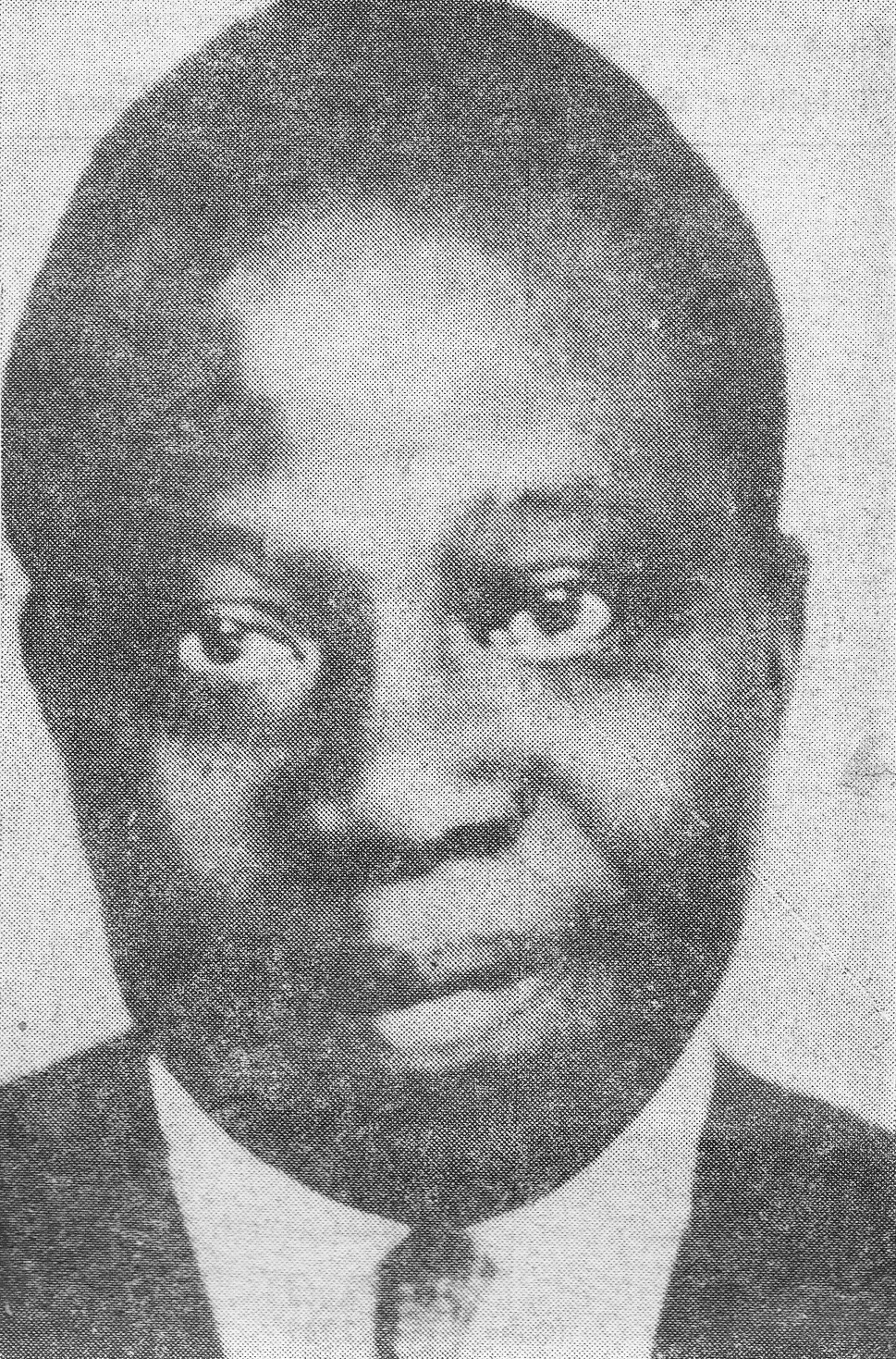
- Boganda in 1958

President of the Council of Government of the Central African Republic
- In office 6 December 1958 – 29 March 1959
- Succeeded by: Abel Goumba

Personal details
- Born: 1910 Bobangui, Oubangui-Chari
- Died: 29 March 1959 (aged 48–49) Boda District, Central African Republic
- Cause of death: Plane crash
- Party: MRP (1946–1950); MESAN (1949–1959)
- Spouse: Michelle Jourdain (m. 1950)
- Children: 3

Ecclesiastical career
- Church: Roman Catholic Church
- Ordained: 17 March 1938
- Laicized: 25 November 1949

Barthélemy Boganda (c. 1910 – 29 March 1959) was a Central African politician and independence activist. Boganda was active prior to his country's independence, during the period when the area, part of French Equatorial Africa, was administered by France under the name of Oubangui-Chari. He served as the first Premier of the Central African Republic as an autonomous territory.

Boganda was born into a family of farmers, and was adopted and educated by Roman Catholic missionaries after the death of his parents. In 1938, he was ordained as a Roman Catholic priest. During World War II, Boganda served in a number of missions and afterwards was persuaded by the Bishop of Bangui to enter politics. In 1946, he became the first Oubanguian elected to the National Assembly of France, where he spoke out against racism and the abuses of the colonial regime. He then returned to Oubangui-Chari to form a political organisation, culminating in the 1949 foundation of the Movement for the Social Evolution of Black Africa (MESAN), which became popular among villagers and the peasantry. Boganda was laicized from the priesthood after developing a relationship with and eventually marrying Michelle Jourdain, a parliamentary secretary. Nonetheless, he continued to advocate for equal treatment and fundamental rights for blacks in the territory well into the 1950s. As France conceded measures of representation to its colonies, MESAN won local elections and he gained influence in Oubangui-Chari's government, though his reputation suffered when he backed an unsuccessful economic scheme.

In 1958 French Prime Minister Charles de Gaulle proposed the creation of a French Community through which France's colonies could associate with the metropole. After being assured that Oubangui-Chari's membership in the community would not preclude it from securing independence at a later time, Boganda supported joining it. He sought to do so as part of a federation with other territories in French Equatorial Africa as a "Central African Republic", which he believed would bolster the financial situation of the member states. He hoped this would serve as the basis for a United States of Latin Africa, a conglomeration including other countries in central Africa. This never came to fruition, and on 1 December, Boganda declared the establishment of the Central African Republic for only Oubangui-Chari. Boganda became the autonomous territory's first premier as the President of the Council of Government, and began drawing up administrative reforms and preparing for the next election. He was killed in a plane crash on 29 March 1959, while en route to Bangui. Experts found a trace of explosives in the plane's wreckage, but a full report on the incident was never published, and the possibility of an assassination remains unresolved. The Central African Republic attained formal independence from France in 1960. Boganda's death is annually commemorated in the country, and his presence in the national collective memory remains politically potent.

== Early life ==
Little is known about Boganda's early life. He was born around the year 1910 (Note: According to the French National Assembly and historian Pierre Kalck, Boganda was born on 4 April 1910. Scholar Côme Kinata wrote that he was born on 9 April 1910. Historian Klaas van Walraven posited that his birth may have occurred "two or three years later".) to a family of farmers in Bobangui, a large M'Baka village in the Lobaye basin located at the edge of the equatorial forest some 80 kilometres (50 mi) southwest of Bangui. His father, Swalakpé, was a village head and the wealthy owner of several palm plantations who had taken numerous wives. Boganda's mother, Siribé, was Swalakpé's third wife. French commercial exploitation of Central Africa had reached an apogee around the time of Boganda's birth, and although interrupted by World War I, activity resumed in the 1920s. The French consortia used what was essentially a form of slavery—the corvée—and one of the most notorious was the Compagnie Forestière de la Haute Sangha-Oubangui (CFSO), involved in rubber gathering in the Lobaye district. Coercive labour practices, violence, and disease had severely disrupted traditional society by the time Boganda was born. Bobangui was particularly affected by these elements. His uncle, whose son, Jean-Bédel Bokassa, would later crown himself as the Emperor of the Central African Empire, was beaten to death at a colonial police station as a result of his alleged resistance to forced labor.

Both of Boganda's parents died when he was young; his father was reportedly killed in a punitive campaign conducted by colonial forces shortly after his birth. His mother died before 1915, probably having been murdered by a CFSO militiaman for not having met a rubber collection quota. Boganda was then given to the care of a guardian who joined the French Army during World War I and was killed at the Battle of Verdun. He was subsequently placed in the tutelage of other relatives, and in 1920 he contracted smallpox. In June his brother was instructed to take him to an uncle, and along the way they encountered a French patrol led by a Lieutenant Mayer. His brother fled out of fear. Left alone, Boganda said, "Gboganda". This was probably a Ngbaka phrase meaning "I am [from] elsewhere", and he was probably hoping to explain that he was lost. The soldiers believed this was his name, rendering it "Boganda", and the name was used for the rest of his life. (Note: According to the French National Assembly, "Boganda"—with the same meaning—was the name given to him by his mother.) Mayer took him to the orphanage in the nearby town of Mbaïki. Once there, a Spiritan missionary touring the area decided to take him to the mission station of Saint Jean Baptiste in Bétou, a town further south on the Ubangi River which was home to a school.

At Bétou, Boganda was instructed in reading and writing in Lingala. Most accounts concur that he was an excellent student. In December 1921 he was taken to the main Spiritan mission of Saint Paul des Rapides in Bangui, the capital of Oubangui-Chari. He was baptised there under the name Barthélemy in late 1922. (Note: Some sources style it as "Barthélemy" while others prefer "Barthélémy".) He later wrote, "To be a Christian meant for me to free myself from ancestral customs, to become a brother of humanity". At Saint Paul he learned French, the catechism, and agricultural labour. By mid-1924 Boganda had completed his primary education and had indicated his desire to become a priest. In November he was sent to the Jesuit petit séminaire in Lemfu, Belgian Congo. The school's curriculum included Latin, French, mathematics, history, and philosophy and was scheduled to take six years to complete, though Boganda had left by 1928/1929. (Note: The reasons for Boganda dropping out of the school are not entirely clear. Biographer Pierre Kalck wrote that Boganda was uncomfortable with the strict method of instruction. Historian Klaas van Walraven wrote, "More probably, [his] dissatisfaction stemmed from the predominant place of Kikongo as language of instruction, as well as the cultural differences between seminarists from Brazzaville (and elsewhere) and the rural world of Lemfu seminarists".) After failing to enroll in a school in France due to lack of money, he entered the Spiritian petit séminaire in Brazzaville. He spent his final year of studies in Bangui, where he was tutored by Monsignor Marcel Grandin, the head of the Catholic Church in Oubangui-Chari. Once this was completed, Grandin enrolled Boganda in the Saint Laurent grand séminaire in Mvolyé, Yaoundé, French Cameroon, in 1931. The first African student at the school, he learned history, Latin, philosophy, theology, and other subjects.

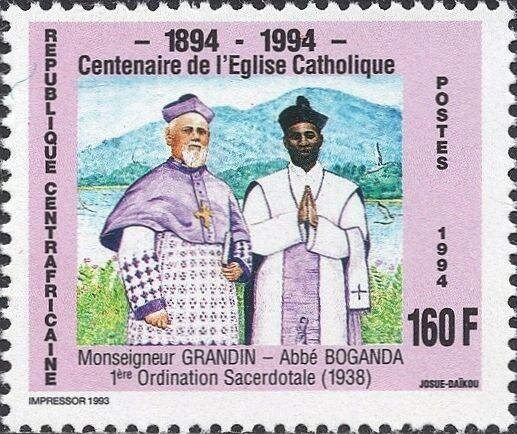
A 1994 Central African stamp depicting the ordination of Father Barthélemy Boganda alongside Monsignor Marcel Grandin.

On 17 March 1938 Boganda was ordained. He was subsequently posted to the new Saint Marcel petit séminaire in Bangui as a teacher. In 1939 his bishop denied his request to join the French Army, deeming it necessary for him to remain, as many persons involved with the church had been recalled to the metropole to fight in World War II. He was posted in the Grimari region from 1941 to 1946 to evangelize the resident Banda population. Boganda was enthusiastic about his work and was angered by local resistance to some of his teachings and practices. This especially included his efforts which contravened local cultural norms, such as his encouragement to abandon polygamy and fetishism and work to enroll girls in school. His response to such hesitation sometimes included violence, and he was accused of beating people and once suggesting a recalcitrant chief be shot with a cartridge of salt. Despite this, he showed a measure of appreciation for some indigenous culture, and was particularly proud that some locals fearfully dubbed him mourou, or leopard, a traditional symbol of power and violence. Boganda believed that the church was providing him with insufficient support and, by the mid-1940s, was in conflict with the local government administrator and felt he was facing racial discrimination from colonial officials, settlers, and some missionaries. Further strain on his position was incurred when he fathered a child in the Bakala region, an action his missionary colleagues saw as scandalous. As a result of these tensions, in 1946 Boganda was transferred to a mission at Bangassou.

== Political career ==
=== National Assembly of France ===
After World War II, Boganda was urged by Grandin to involve himself in politics. In particular, Grandin hoped he would seek election to the National Assembly of France. Some Oubanguians had already indicated that they would support Boganda if he contested a seat in the assembly, and Grandin hoped that Boganda could preserve the interests of the Catholic Church from the local growth of Protestantism and increasing leftist and anti-colonial thought in both France and its colonies. Boganda decided to compete, and on 10 November 1946, he was elected deputy for Oubangui-Chari, becoming the first native Oubanguian to join the assembly after winning 10,846 votes—almost half of the total votes cast—and defeating three other candidates, including the incumbent, François Joseph Reste, who had formerly served as the Governor-General of French Equatorial Africa. Formally, Boganda identified with the Popular Republican Movement (MRP). His election was confirmed on 20 December and he was made a member of the Assembly's Overseas Territories Commission and the Supply Commission. He arrived in Paris attired in his clerical garb and introduced himself to his fellow legislators as the son of a polygamous cannibal, probably in a deliberate attempt to project a personal aura of omnipotence. Grandin sought to maintain influence over his former pupil and had requested that the Spiritans in France welcome him, provide lodging, and introduce him to Catholic politicians and keep him away from left-leaning groups. They did not do this, and Boganda expressed disappointment at the lack of a reception upon his arrival and the weak support from French deputies for his proposals to help his constituents in Oubangui-Chari.

Boganda left the MRP in 1950 and served as an independent thereafter. He was reelected to the National Assembly in 1951 and 1956. He made only two parliamentary interventions during his tenure, in August 1947 on the abuses of colonialism and in June 1950 on the lack of social justice in French Equatorial Africa. After 1956, he largely stopped attending the Paris parliament, though he remained a deputy until 1958. Frustrated by the faults of colonial rule in Oubangui-Chari and an unwillingness on the part of local officials to accept reforms, he quickly resorted to vocal criticism of French administration in the colony. He paid particular attention to racism and highlighted incidents of settler violence against black Africans to boost his own political following. Among his complaints were instances of arbitrary arrest, low wages, compulsory cotton cultivation, and the barring of blacks from restaurants and cinemas. In April 1947, Grandin complained to the governor of Oubangui-Chari that Boganda had "escaped from his cage" and was "flying like an idiot". While his rhetoric was anti-colonial, Boganda nominally supported French political ideals and did not oppose continuing connections between France and Oubangui-Chari. He also identified as a staunch anti-communist and accused colonial administrators of being "anti-French" and "worthy sons of Stalin", making it difficult for them to criticise him. He proposed several measures aimed at reforming communal land ownership and ensuring the prohibition of forced labour, but his serious attacks on French colonial policy upset the other deputies and as a result his ideas were never incorporated into the parliamentary agenda.

=== Political organising in Oubangui-Chari ===
Feeling as though his actions in the National Assembly were engendering little substantive change in Oubangui-Chari, Boganda grew disenchanted with parliamentary politics and decided to seek direct political action within the territory. In an attempt to improve Oubanguian farmers' incomes, spur colonial reform, and form a political organisation for himself, in 1948 he launched a co-operative project, the Société Coopérative Oubangui, Lobaye, Lesse (SOCOULOLE), which aimed to provide food, clothing, lodging, medical care, and education. Boganda hastily established the organization without regard for the competence of its staff or the standards of trading goods, though he made sure to include communal healers in its management. Initially operating with a French subsidy, over time the co-operative became embroiled with allegations of financial improprieties and ran low on money. Boganda attempted to fund it with his parliamentary salary, but its deficits rapidly increased.

On 28 September 1949, at Bangui, Boganda established the Movement for the Social Evolution of Black Africa (MESAN), a mass political party. He wrote its founding code, which stipulated that the organisation sought "to develop and liberate the black race by progressive and pacific evolution, achieved by the combined efforts of all negroes throughout the world". Politically, the party supported liberty and equality for Africans, while economically it endorsed the use of co-operative ventures. Framing his political programme as a matter of fundamental rights, Boganda coined the Sango phrase zo kwe zo, which translated to "every human being is a person". He praised "peasant virtues" and the rustic life before colonialism, and these messages resonated with rural farmers. Furthermore, Oubanguians appreciated his willingness to angrily confront colonial officials. Boganda deliberately strived to instill his rhetoric with a sense of religiosity and mysticism, and he frequently used Latin in his speeches. Rumours began to circulate of his supposed invulnerability and supernatural powers, and at one point later in his career a large crowd waited on the shore of the Ubangi River to see him walk over the water (he did not appear).

MESAN's activities angered the French administration and the companies trading in cotton, coffee, diamonds, and other commodities. The Bangui Chamber of Commerce was controlled by these companies, and its members resented the end of forced labour and the resultant rise of black nationalism. They despised Boganda, viewing him as a dangerous revolutionary demagogue and a threat to their "free enterprise", and they resolved to get rid of him. French colonists and administrators established local Gaullist Rally of the French People (RPF) branches to counter MESAN. Drawing on the support of government workers, clerks, and Free French veterans of World War II, the party sought to take credit for colonial reforms, but failed to generate popular traction. The presence of the African Democratic Rally (RDA) in the other three territories of French Equatorial Africa posed some threat to MESAN, but they were eventually reduced to minor groups.

Boganda was not particularly concerned with his religious mission once he entered politics, but he used the enormous popular respect for the Catholic Church to his advantage, manipulating religious symbols for political purposes. Boganda's attachment to the clergy weakened when he met and fell in love with a young Frenchwoman, Michelle Jourdain, who was employed as a parliamentary secretary. By 1949 they were cohabitating and Boganda wrote a letter to his Catholic superiors, pointing out that clerical celibacy was a rule created by the Catholic Church and had no biblical basis. On 25 November he was expelled from the priesthood. Despite this, Boganda remained a devout Catholic and sympathetic to missionary interests. The couple was married on 13 June 1950, and would later have two daughters and a son.

On 10 January 1951, SOCOULOLE agents in the village of Bokanga became involved in a heated dispute with local Portuguese merchants, with the former objecting to the latter's practice of forming a coalition amongst themselves. The co-operative agents insisted that the village market be closed until Boganda could arrive to represent their case. By the time he arrived, SOCOULOLE members had blocked the roads leading out of the locale with trees to prevent the merchants' trucks from leaving. Fearing a loss of law and order, the head of the district of Mbaïki arrested Boganda (along with his accompanying wife) and held him in detention for two days. He was charged with "endangering the peace" and on 29 March the local court sentenced him to two months in prison (his wife was condemned to two weeks incarceration for aiding him). Since he was arrested in flagrante delicto, his parliamentary immunity offered him no protection. Boganda terminated SOCOULOLE later that year due to financial difficulties. Boganda's arrest occurred five months before the next round of French National Assembly elections, and he framed it as a campaign issue. He ultimately won re-election, defeating challengers from the RPF and RDA, and the colonial administration acceded to his return to office.

=== Co-operation with the French ===
In 1952, the French government appointed more reform-oriented officials in French Equatorial Africa, allowing for a relaxation in tensions between Boganda and the local administration. In March 1953 RPF leader Charles de Gaulle visited Bangui. Boganda refused to see him due to his leadership of the party, but de Gaulle refrained from taking a public stance on the politics in Oubangui-Chari, a move which was interpreted as an expression of disapproval of the local RPF's tactics.

On 30 April 1954, disorder erupted in Berbérati when news emerged that two Africans who worked for a European—who was known for his abusive treatment of the locals—had died. The families of the deceased demanded the European's arrest, and a crowd gathered in the town and began rioting and assaulting public officials. Once word reached Brazzaville, the colonial authorities began mobilising troops to march on Berbérati, and Oubangui-Chari Governor Louis Sanmarco pleaded with Boganda to accompany him to the locale and intervene. The following day Boganda appeared before the crowd and told them that "the same justice would be administered to white as to black". Thus assured, the crowd dispersed and order was restored. The riot deeply worried the administration, which acknowledged in its own reports that Europeans' racism towards Africans was pervasive in the territory.

No substantial violence succeeded the Berbérati riot, and in the following months the RPF increasingly struggled as MESAN continued to grow. Boganda praised the educational and health work done by the colonial administration before the French National Assembly, saying "doctors, administrators, and colonists are our friends [...] We are not as ungrateful as we are black. We know how much has been done for our country". Addressing the Grand Council of French Equatorial Africa, he complimented Sanmarco and declared, "Oubangui-Chari has embarked on a positive undertaking at last, after years of negative grievances and sterile struggles, and a better future is ahead". With the assistance of the colonial administration, Boganda established his own coffee plantation and encouraged rural residents to follow suit if possible. Meanwhile, district councils were established, and he attended their meetings in Boda and Mbaïki, urging the MESAN members to collaborate with the European district heads.

=== Internal autonomy and MESAN government ===
In June 1956 the French National Assembly passed the Loi-cadre Defferre, an act which conceded a measure of internal autonomy to French colonies. The Europeans in Oubangui-Chari politically organised themselves to seize control of the new local institutions, particularly the office of Mayor of Bangui. René Naud—the European president of the Bangui Chamber of Commerce—and other white merchants offered themselves as candidates in the November election, but Boganda entered the race and quickly became the favourite to win. On 18 November he won the election and became the first Mayor of Bangui.

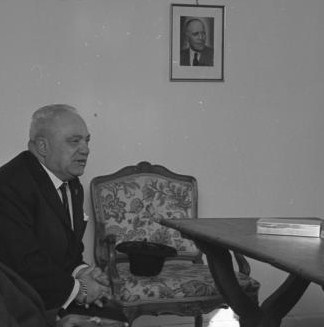
Boganda backed the widely-criticised economic plan proposed by Roger Guérillot (pictured), damaging his own reputation.

On 4 February 1957, in accordance with the loi-cadre, the French government formally decreed the semi-autonomous status of each of the four territories of French Equatorial Africa, including Oubangui-Chari. Collectively, the four territories constituted a federation led by a General High Commissioner with the assistance of a Grand Council. Within Oubangui-Chari, the former French governor became the High Commissioner, who was to preside over a Council of Government, with its members to be chosen by the newly created Territorial Assembly. On 31 March, MESAN won all seats in the Assembly and, at Boganda's request, Hector Rivierez was elected its presiding officer. He also arranged for Abel Goumba, the territory's only African doctor and a former catechism student of his, to become Vice President of the Council of Government. The council was installed on 17 May without Boganda as a member, since he did not want to participate in a government presided over by a French commissioner, and was also increasingly concerned with political organising at a federal level. Instead, he became President of the Grand Council.

The only European minister in the Council of Government was Roger Guérillot, who had previously secured the confidence of Boganda and worked as MESAN's treasurer. He was given charge of the portfolio for economic and administrative affairs. Guérillot sought to increase Africanisation of the administration, since there was a lack of trained Oubanguians and such a change would weaken the government and strengthen the position of the French colonists. He encouraged Boganda to go on a rhetorical offensive against French officials, whom he dubbed "the saboteurs of the loi-cadre". In a speech before the Territorial Assembly, Boganda suggested that the French administrators should leave and Oubanguians could "curse their shameful memory for ever", but also noted that it would take several years to train African personnel to replace them. He softened his stance a few days later while addressing the Grand Council, suggesting the colonies needed "a new form of administration" and proposing the transformation of districts into "rural communities" with trusted officials from the existing bureaucracy serving as directors of each.

In the mid-1950s a Bangui study group had proposed the construction of a rail line from Bangui to Chad. This was both to secure Oubangui-Chari's commercial relations with southern Chad—which was facing strain due to competition from Cameroon—and to satisfy private firms that sought a large state contract to make up for the decline in foreign investment driven by uncertainties in the territory's political future. Boganda believed that it would only be reasonable to embark on the railway project if Oubanguian economic output was greatly increased, so he requested that Guérillot draw up a programme for improving production and raising the standard of living.

Guérillot proposed a large scheme totaling four billion Central African CFA francs in expenditures to greatly increase the cultivation of coffee trees, cotton, and ground-nuts. As a part of this, he conceived a Committee of Economic Safety, which would consist of more regional bodies of European merchants and MESAN officials who would oversee peasants' production efforts. On 30 December, Boganda praised the committee as "the union of capital and Oubanguian labour" and convinced the Territorial Assembly to allow Guérillot to proceed. French colonists found the project risky and did not invest in it, and were followed in their abstention by banks and French economic aid organizations. Goumba also thought the proposal demanded too much of peasants and began formulating his own economic platform. Meanwhile, Guérillot recruited unemployed whites in Bangui as "inspectors" with African auxiliaries to directly manage cultivation. Peasants regarded the scheme as a return to the concessionary system and began publicly protesting it. Facing skepticism in the press and a measure of isolation for earlier excluding Antoine Darlan—Oubangui-Chari's representative to the French Union—from MESAN, Boganda traveled throughout the territory to try to allay peasants' fears and exhort them to work. He stressed that increased agricultural production was the only way for Oubangui-Chari to become economically viable without French aid. Angered by public criticism, he proposed banning all political activity. The economic scheme ultimately failed to achieve its goals and damaged Boganda's reputation, as well as tarnishing the view of the Council of Government both domestically and in the French and Belgian governments.

=== De Gaulle and the French Community ===
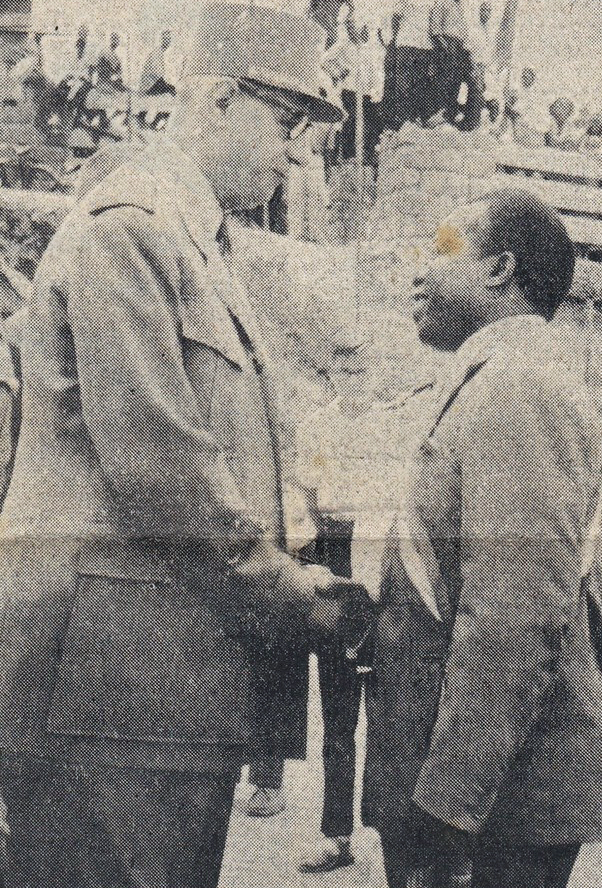
Boganda (right) receiving French Prime Minister Charles de Gaulle in Brazzaville in August 1958 to discuss the political future of Oubangui-Chari

Following the failure of the Algiers putsch in May 1958, de Gaulle reassumed power in France as Prime Minister and prepared to draft a new French constitution, stressing the importance of re-examining a federal relationship between France and its colonies. Boganda was not included in the new constitutional commission, to his dismay. De Gaulle hosted him in Paris in July, and upon his return to Oubangui-Chari he expressed to the Territorial Assembly that the loi-cadre was insufficient for the territory and the rest of Sub-Saharan Africa. He told the body he wanted assurance of "the people's right to self-determination and a voluntary freely-consented independence. The ways of introducing it are to be examined". The Assembly passed a motion repeating Boganda's demands.

De Gaulle proposed the creation of a new federal French Community that would encompass the African colonies. Boganda opposed Oubangui-Chari joining the community, fearing it would forestall independence. In August a meeting was held in Brazzaville between de Gaulle and political leaders in French Equatorial Africa. Boganda presented a petition signed by the leaders which requested that the new French constitution recognise the right of its colonies to declare independence. De Gaulle assured him that Oubangui-Chari's membership in the community would not preclude it from securing independence at a later time. A referendum was to be held in each colony in order to determine its support for the new constitution and joining the community; de Gaulle warned that while a negative vote would grant a territory immediate independence, it would also lead to the termination of all French aid. On 30 August Boganda told MESAN leaders he supported an affirmative vote in favour of the constitution, and he subsequently traveled around Oubangui-Chari to tell the people that the French would remain slightly longer "to set right the ravages of colonisation". The referendum was held on 28 September and 98% of voters chose to support the new constitution.

=== Regional unity and the United States of Latin Africa ===
While the French constitution had placed political responsibility upon each territorial assembly in Africa and expected them to ratify the results of their referendums, it left open the possibility of federations. Boganda had been worried about balkanisation in Africa for some time, and believed that independence of Oubangui-Chari as a single state would be disastrous. He used his position as President of the Grand Council to encourage the formation of a united state in Central Africa. He wrote a tract which stated, "A united state with a united government and united parliament would reduce our expenses considerably. We could restrict the administrative budget and devote more of our resources to developing the welfare of our countries, so that all citizens would benefit, not just one privileged category. It is obvious that such an arrangement would encourage investment".

Map of the proposed United States of Latin Africa

Boganda articulated a new framework for the states of French Equatorial Africa whereby there would be a central government and legislature. There would be an annually rotating presidency in which each former territory would take turns supplying the officeholder. The territories would become departments under the supervision of ministers of state and be divided into urban sections and rural communes. Due to the geographic span of such a federation—which would include Oubangui-Chari, Congo, Gabon, and Chad—he proposed that the state would be known as the "Central African Republic". He stressed the urgency of accomplishing this as quickly as possible, saying, "The Central African Republic must be built today, for tomorrow it will be too late [...] Chad and Oubangui-Chari will surely be solicited by other voices and other means". In a speech, Boganda revealed he envisioned the Central African Republic as a step in creating a larger United States of Latin Africa:

Next we have to examine the question of the right bank of the Congo [river]. Since the official historical frontier is the Congo and not the Oubangui [river], we must regard that area from now on as belonging to the Central African Republic. Thirdly, we must work towards re-uniting the two Congos. The fourth stage will be to create the United States of Latin Africa, including the Central African Republic, the so-called Belgian Congo, Ruanda-Urundi, Angola, and Cameroon.

Boganda dispatched Rivierez and David Dacko to Gabon, Chad, and the Congo to explore their interest in a united state. The two were unable to secure a meeting with authorities in Gabon, while Chadian leaders rejected the idea. Jacques Opangault, the leader of the government in the Congo, was enthusiastic about the proposal, but his majority in the Congolese legislature was slim and his position weak. Gabon was the richest of the states, and its refusal to engage with the proposal made the French hesitant to sanction the federation. In late November the French High Commissioner convened a meeting of the equatorial leaders in Brazzaville and told them that each territorial assembly was to independently ratify its referendums and finalise its decision to adhere to the new constitution. By 28 November, all the other territories had decided to join the French Community as separate entities. Disheartened, Boganda resigned himself to proclaiming only Oubangui-Chari as the Central African Republic on 1 December.

=== Central African Republic ===
Boganda designed the flag of the Central African Republic.

The Central African Republic adopted a design drawn up by Boganda for its flag, including a star, the French tricolour, and colors of other African flags. He also penned the lyrics for the national anthem, "La Renaissance". On 6 December, the CAR's first government was established with Boganda as President of the Council of Government (premier), though a French High Commissioner was retained. Frustrated with Guérillot's economic failures and political maneuverings to be elected to the French Senate, he sent Guérillot to France as a diplomat and replaced him at the Ministry of Interior and Economic Affairs with Dacko. He made several other changes to the composition of the original council, but retained Goumba as Minister of State and de facto vice president of the council.

The new government's first action was to adopt a law banning nudity and vagrancy. Its main objective, however, was to draw up a constitution. Democratic in nature, the document provided for a unicameral parliament with a five-year term and a prime minister for the same period. The text was largely borrowed from the French constitution, though Boganda had some influence over the wording of the preamble and pushed for the inclusion of a provision that allowed the country to cede its sovereignty to a wider union. The draft was approved by the assembly on 16 February 1959. Boganda then set about creating extensive administrative reforms, including the establishment of rural and urban municipalities, the creation of district councils with broad authority, and the institution of mutual development societies. The government also drafted new electoral constituencies and scheduled elections for the Legislative Assembly on 5 April. Boganda personally oversaw the selection of MESAN's candidates and agreed to include five Frenchmen on its lists. The government also created a new electoral law which stipulated that civil servants could not run for office unless they had been on leave of absence for at least six months prior to the polling date. Furthermore, the law required all parties to nominate their candidates in lists instead of individually, and if one candidate was disqualified, the whole list would be dismissed. As a result, all opposition lists were thrown out by the courts, leaving MESAN unopposed. Opposition politicians were infuriated, and when asked about the impending lack of a parliamentary opposition, Boganda told the press, "We will create our own opposition within our party".

== Death ==
=== Plane crash ===
On 29 March 1959 Boganda boarded a Nord Noratlas plane at Berbérati, where he had been campaigning, for a flight to Bangui. The plane was owned by Union Aéromaritime de Transport, which transported the mail between the two cities. The plane went missing, and its wreckage was discovered the following day in the district of Boda. All four crew and five passengers, including the government's information chief and a member of the Assembly, were found dead. Boganda's body was recovered from the pilot's cabin.

The French General Secretariat of Civil Aviation ordered an inquiry and sent a team to investigate the crash site. A report was never published, but shortly afterwards the Paris weekly L'Express revealed that investigators had identified traces of explosive in the wreckage. The French High Commissioner ordered all copies of the reporting edition suppressed in the Central African Republic. No cause for the crash has ever been definitively determined. Many Central Africans believed that the crash was an assassination; in particular, many suspected that expatriate businessmen from the Bangui Chamber of Commerce, possibly aided by the French secret service, played a role. Michelle Jourdain was also suspected of being involved; by 1959, relations between Boganda and his wife had deteriorated, and he thought of leaving her and returning to the priesthood. She had a large insurance policy on his life, taken out just days before the accident. Historian Gérard Prunier wrote that "the probability of foul play was very high", noting, "The whites who worked for what was left of the Grandes Compagnies Concessionaires hated Boganda, who had been instrumental in finally getting compulsory labor outlawed in 1946. They also hated his intelligence, which was unsettling to their view of black inferiority".

=== Political consequences ===
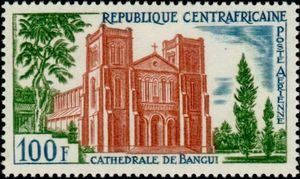
Boganda's funeral was held outside the Notre-Dame Cathedral in Bangui (pictured on a 1964 stamp).

Aside from some minor disorder in Mbaïki, the country received Boganda's death in relative calm. Some of his followers suggested that he had not died and would return to the public in the future. His funeral was held on 3 April outside of the Notre-Dame Cathedral in Bangui and attended by thousands, with Robert Lecourt representing the French government and Raymond Janot representing the French Community. Charles Féraille, a priest who had been personally acquainted with Boganda, declared that he had been "chosen by God" to lead the country. Goumba replaced him as interim President of the Council of Government, while Étienne Ngounio took over the office of Mayor of Bangui and the MESAN party presidency. Boganda's parliamentary constituency was declared vacant in the elections held on 5 April, which were handily won by MESAN, though with a sharp drop in voter turnout. With its founder gone, MESAN substantively ceased to exist aside as a label.

Dacko, with the backing of the French High Commissioner, the Bangui Chamber of Commerce, and Jourdain, offered himself as a candidate to lead the Council of Government. Goumba was hesitant to divide the populace, and after a month in power conceded the presidency to Dacko. Dacko became consumed with administrative work and, though he had initially retained Goumba as Minister of State, dismissed him after several months. In 1960 Goumba founded a new political party, the Democratic Evolution Movement of Central Africa (MEDAC), and claimed it carried the ideals of Boganda and MESAN. Frightened by its rapid growth, Dacko declared his intent to revive MESAN. Under his government, political focus moved away from the peasantry and was drawn to the creation of a new moneyed elite, mostly favouring officials who received large salaries. The Central African Republic received its full independence from France on 13 August 1960. Dacko pushed several measures through the Assembly which invested him as President of the Republic and head of state, and gave the government wide authority to suppress political opposition. By 1962 he had arrested Goumba and declared MESAN the sole party of the state.

== Legacy ==
=== Commemoration and political legacy ===
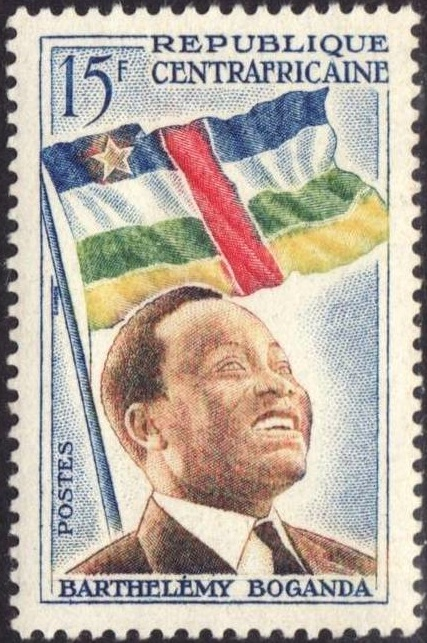
The Central African Republic released this postage stamp featuring Boganda flanked by the national flag on 1 December 1959. Intended to commemorate Boganda, it was designed by Pierre Gandon.

The Legislative Assembly declared Boganda the "Father of the Nation" in June 1959. He was posthumously awarded Knight of the Legion of Honour, Grand Cross of the Order of Central African Merit, and Commander of the Order of Agricultural Merit. The Boganda National Museum, named for the former premier and hosted in his former Bangui residence, was opened in 1966. A secondary school and an avenue were also named in his honour, while a statue of him was erected at an independence memorial in the capital. Jean-Bédel Bokassa, leader of the Central African Republic between 1966 and 1979, promoted a cult of personality for Boganda as the founder of MESAN and the republic. Boganda Day is observed annually on 29 March to commemorate his death.

Mythical perceptions of Boganda's invulnerability persisted after his death, and his presence in Central African collective memory remains politically potent, serving as a unifying element among both the country's elite and the general populace. His phrase, zo kwe zo, was incorporated into the state's coat of arms. The preamble of the republic's 2004 constitution read, in part: "Animated by the wish of assuring to man his dignity with respect to the principle of 'ZO KWE ZO' enunciated by the Founder of the Central African Republic Barthélemy BOGANDA". Despite this, his political ideas have generally not been studied by successive Central African leaders. Historian Klaas van Walraven wrote, "his contemporary significance may lie precisely in the memory of his comportment and the widespread ignorance of his ideas".

=== Historiography ===
Historian Georges Chaffard described Boganda as "the most prestigious and the most capable of Equatorial political men", while Prunier called him "probably the most gifted and most inventive of French Africa's decolonization generation of politicians". Historian Brian Titley suggested that Boganda's death "robbed the country of a charismatic leader" able to maintain legitimacy and in the long term facilitated General Bokassa's overthrow of Dacko and subsequent military takeover in 1966.

Boganda's life has some presence in French language histography, but much of what has been written about his biographical details, especially by Central African authors, is hagiographic in nature. His ideas and speeches have been more thoroughly incorporated into general analyses of political philosophies. Boganda is rarely mentioned in English historiography, and where he is included it is generally within the context of his Pan-African project of the United States of Latin Africa.

== Works cited ==
- Bigo, Didier (1988). Pouvoir et obéissance en Centrafrique (in French). Karthala Editions. ISBN 978-2865372133.
- Bradshaw, Richard; Fandos-Rius, Juan (2016). Historical Dictionary of the Central African Republic (4th, reprint ed.). Lanham: Rowman & Littlefield. ISBN 978-0810879928.
- Chirot, Daniel (1996). Modern Tyrants: The Power and Prevalence of Evil in Our Age. Princeton: Princeton University Press. ISBN 0691027773.
- Falola, Toyin; Jean-Jacques, Daniel, eds. (2015). Africa: An Encyclopedia of Culture and Society. ABC-CLIO. ISBN 978-1598846669.
- Goumba, Abel (2007). Les Mémoires et les Réflexions (in French). Paris: Ccinia Communication. ISBN 978-2915568073.
- Heyns, Christoph, ed. (1999). Human Rights Law in Africa. The Hague: Martinus Nijhoff Publishers. ISBN 9041102876.
- Kalck, Pierre (1971). Central African Republic: A Failure in De-Colonisation. translated by Barbara Thomson. London: Pall Mall Press. ISBN 0269028013.
- Kalck, Pierre (2005). Historical Dictionary of the Central African Republic. translated by Xavier-Samuel Kalck (3rd ed.). Lanham: The Scarecrow Press. ISBN 0810849135.
- Kinata, Côme (2008). "Barthélémy Boganda et l'Église catholique en Oubangui-Chari" [Barthélémy Boganda and the Catholic Church in Oubangui-Chari]. Cahiers d'Études Africaines (in French). 48 (191): 549–565. doi:10.4000/etudesafricaines.12292. JSTOR 40379941.
- Le Vine, Victor T. (2004). Politics in Francophone Africa: The States of West and Equatorial Africa. Boulder: Lynne Rienner Publishers. ISBN 1588262499.
- O'Toole, Thomas E. (2019). The Central African Republic: The Continent's Hidden Heart. London: Routledge. ISBN 978-1000315134.
- Prunier, Gérard (2009). Africa's World War: Congo, the Rwandan Genocide, and the Making of a Continental Catastrophe. Oxford: Oxford University Press. ISBN 978-0195374209.
- Titley, Brian (1997). Dark Age: The Political Odyssey of Emperor Bokassa. Montreal: McGill-Queen's University Press. ISBN 0773516026.
- van Walraven, Klaas (2017). "The Diaries of Barthélémy Boganda, Priest and Politician in French Equatorial Africa (1910–1959)". History in Africa. 44: 237–264. doi:10.1017/hia.2016.14. ISSN 1558-2744. S2CID 201721582.
- van Walraven, Klaas (2019). "The historical long-term in the politics of the Central African Republic: Insights from the biography of Barthélémy Boganda (1910–1959)". ASC Working Paper (146). African Studies Centre Leiden.
- Villalón, Leonardo A.; VonDoepp, Peter (2005). The Fate of Africa's Democratic Experiments: Elites and Institutions. Bloomington: Indiana University Press. ISBN 978-0253003119.
- Yansané, Aguibou Y. (1984). Decolonization in West African States, with French Colonial Legacy: Comparison and Contrast : Development in Guinea, the Ivory Coast, and Senegal, 1945–1980. Schenkman Publishing Company. ISBN 978-0870733291.
