= Mariama Ndoye =

Senegalese writer born Mariama Ndoye (born 1953)

- Born: 1953 (age 72–73)
- Citizenship: Senegalese
- Education: Doctorate in French language and literature
- Occupation: curator
- Organization: IFAN Museum of African Arts in Daka

Mariama Ndoye-Mbengue (born 1953) is a Senegalese writer born Mariama Ndoye. She became "Ndoye-Mbengue" on marriage. She has a doctorate in French language and literature. She has received awards for her short-stories and novels. For a period until 1986, she was curator of the IFAN Museum of African Arts in Dakar. She has also lived abroad spending 15 years in the Côte d'Ivoire and currently living in Tunisia.

== Bibliography ==
- De vous à moi [From you to me]. Paris: Présence Africaine, 1990 (96 pp.). ISBN 2-7087-0538-5. Short story collection
- Sur des chemins pavoisés [On roads decked out with flags] . Abidjan. CEDA, 1993 (77 pp.). ISBN 2-86394-196-8. Novel.
- Parfums d'enfance [Childhood Fragrances]. Abidjan: Les Nouvelles Editions Ivoiriennes, 1995 (128 pp.). ISBN 2-910190-60-9. Short stories.
- Soukey. Abidjan: Les Nouvelles Editions Ivoiriennes, 1999 (200 pp.). ISBN 2-911725-79-4. Novel. Prize Vincent de Paul Nyonda (2000).
- Comme du bon pain. Abidjan: Les Nouvelles Editions Ivoiriennes, 2001 (190 pp.). ISBN 2-84487-136-4. Novel
