= 1952 Moyen-Congo Territorial Assembly election =

Territorial Assembly elections were held in Moyen-Congo in 1952. The Congolese Progressive Party emerged as the largest faction, winning 16 seats in the second college.

== Electoral system ==
The 37 members of the Territorial Assembly were elected in two colleges; the first college elected 13 members and the second elected 24.

== Results ==
Party	Seats
First College
Rally of the French People	13
Second College
Congolese Progressive Party	16
French Section of the Workers' International	8
Total	37
Source: Gauze
