= Arabi El Goni =

Chadian politician (1920–1973)

Arabi El Goni (January 1, 1920 in Abeche, Chad – October 22, 1973) was a politician from Chad who served in the French National Assembly from 1956-1958.
