= Roger Guérillot =

French colonist

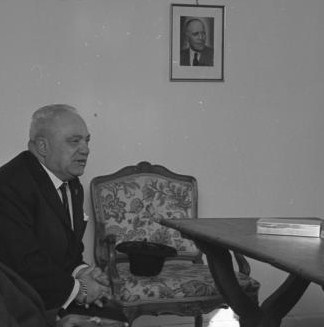
- Guérillot in 1964

Central African Ambassador to Belgium, Luxembourg, and the EEC
- In office 13 February 1962 – 1 January 1970

Minister of Economic Affairs of Ubangi-Shari
- In office 14 May 1957 – 6 December 1958
- Preceded by: Post created
- Succeeded by: David Dacko

Minister of Administrative Affairs of Ubangi-Shari
- In office 14 May 1957 – 1 July 1958
- Preceded by: Post created
- Succeeded by: David Dacko

Personal details
- Born: Roger Léon Charles Guérillot; 12 November 1904 XIVe Arron., Paris, France
- Died: 31 October 1971 (aged 66) Uccle, Brussels, Belgium
- Citizenship: France, Ubangi-Shari, Central African Republic
- Party: Movement for the Social Evolution of Black Africa
- Education: École Spéciale des Travaux Publics

Military service
- Allegiance: France
- Branch: Free French Forces
- Years of service: 1940–1945
- Wars: World War II
- Military awards: Commemorative Voluntary Free France Medal; Resistance Medal

Roger Léon Charles Guérillot (French: [ʁɔʒe ɡeʁijo]; 12 November 1904 – 31 October 1971) was a French colonist of Ubangi-Shari who was involved in the process of independence by which it became the Central African Republic.

Guérillot is known mainly for having developed the Committee of Economic Health, a failed project for the expansion of plantations in Ubangi-Shari, under the authority of the Loi Cadre Defferre (1957–1958). It was based on conservative ideals but presented as part of the emancipation of the colonies. In general, his political orientation was controversial and he seems to have been guided solely by personal interests.

== Biography ==
=== From colonist to African emancipation movement ===
Roger Guérillot was born on 12 November 1904 in the 14th arrondissement of Paris, to a 21-year-old domestic servant, Marie Guérillot, employed by a family of the 16th arrondissement. Until the end of his life, Guérillot used two first names on legal documents, Léon and Charles, He had been a student at the École Spéciale des Travaux Publics before being hired by Michelin in 1928, to work as an engineer in their technical service centre in Paris. The historian Pierre Kalck claims that Guérillot was only a mechanic, dispatched to French Equatorial Africa in 1928 to work on the steamships. In 1935, Guérillot left Michelin and moved to Ubangi-Shari where he worked for the Society of African Mechanics and then the Society for Forestry and Industrial Exploitation. Following the invasion of France by Axis forces in July 1940, Guérillot joined the Free French. For his services he was awarded the Resistance Medal and the Commemorative medal for voluntary service in Free France after the war.

In 1944, following the Brazzaville Conference, a reform of the colonial society of French Equatorial Africa was announced. Guérillot was opposed to the granting of political rights to Africans. As a result, he became hostile to the colonial administration. His engagement with politics was affirmed when he was employed by Uniroute in a society for land transport and joined the Bangui Chamber of Commerce, as well as the Bangui Masonic lodge. With this support he was elected as a councillor of the Territorial Assembly of Ubangi-Shari by the European college of voters in 1952. (Note: By the Loi Lamine Guèye of 7 May 1946, the French Fourth Republic had granted native subjects of the French Colonial Empire "citizenship of the French Union". This union citizenship was not citizenship of the French Republic but granted some freedoms to the native subjects (freedom of assembly, association, movement, and press) and the right to political representation. The union citizenship as distinct from French citizenship and elections in the French colonial territories were organised according to a "double college". The natives (as union citizens) voted for their own representatives separately from and in parallel with the European colonists who were French citizens. This system enabled the colonists to retain control over local politics.) In the same year, he received a seat on the grand council of French Equatorial Africa from his peers.

Like the majority of the colonists, Guérillot was hostile to the native député Barthélemy Boganda. In 1954, he proposed the formation of an anti-Bogandist militia to Governor Louis Sanmarco. When this failed, he changed his position. The movement towards the internal autonomy of the colonies appeared irreversible. The French government was inclined to suppress the double electoral college. In 1955, with the approval of the Europeans of Bangui, Guérillot concluded an accord with Bouganda, leading to the creation of the Ubangi Liberal Inter-Group, of which Guérillot was co-vice-president. As a result, Guérillot became vice-president of the Territorial Assembly of Ubangi-Shari and of the Grand Council of French Equatorial Africa in 1956. He had completely acquired the confidence of Boganda, who in turn named him General Treasurer of his party, the Movement for the Social Evolution of Black Africa (MESAN). In 1957, he was one of eight Europeans elected in the territorial elections on the MESAN list, on the list in Lobaye, with Boganda himself as one of his co-candidates.

=== The white minister of Ubangi under the Loi-cadre Defferre ===
As a result of the entry into force of the Loi-cadre Defferre in 1956, the 1957 elections led to the formation of a council for local government. Although he had won these elections with a landslide, the council was presided over by the French High Commissioner, so Boganda refused to enter it. Nevertheless, he personally arranged its composition. On 14 May 1957, Guérillot was named as one of six ministers—the only European to be appointed. He was entrusted with the super-portfolio of Economic and Administrative Affairs and was thus effectively Minister of the Interior and Minister of the Economy. Guérillot adopted a paternalistic attitude towards his African ministerial colleagues: he took care of their facilities, organised a car for each of them, chose their residences, and decorated their offices. Most importantly, he made himself an obligatory intermediary between the ministers and Boganda, requiring that any request to meet with the leader of MESAN be addressed to him personally. He seems to have done this without Boganda's knowledge.

==== Extraordinary promotion of African senior officials ====
In October 1957, while Ubangi-Shari was in the grip of social protests, some African officials demanded equality with their white colleagues and Guérillot decided to raise their salaries. When it proved impossible to put this promise into practice, the government adopted another of Guérillot's ideas: demanding that the French government release 400 million francs to enable an "extraordinary promotion of African senior officials," while retaining European officials in their roles. The response was negative. In response, Guérillot and Boganda organised a campaign of protest against the administrators of Outre-mer.

==== Fuel tax ====
In December 1957, the vice-president of the Government Council, Abel Goumba, presented the projected budget of the council of ministers for 1958 to the Territorial Assembly, which included a tax hike for commercial enterprises which did not re-invest in Ubangi-Shari. At the session of 20 December, Guérillot separated himself from the government denouncing the "asphyxiation" of the Ubangi-Shari economy and suggested the replacement of certain tariffs and taxes by a tax on fuel. This project, called a système de détaxation-surtaxation, was inspired by the economic theories developed by the founder of the cosmetics group L'Oréal, Eugène Schueller.

The idea of a special tax on fuel was most widely considered in the spring of 1958 when Guérillot was focused on the finances necessary to create rural collectives in Ubangi-Shari. Guérillot calculated that their introduction would require an additional 60–85 million Central African CFA francs in the local budget. According to Guérillot, Ubangi-Shari could increase its income by instituting a monopoly on the sale of petrol, given to an authorised company which would pass a levy on petrol to the public treasury. When Guérillot found this project difficult to apply solely within Ubangi-Shari, he proposed it to the Grand Council in Brazzaville as a project to be implemented across the whole of French Equatorial Africa. Eventually, the project was abandoned.

==== Committee for Economic Health ====
Guérillot entered into a rivalry with Abel Goumba. In December 1957, he scuttled the development project focused on education which had been proposed by Goumba in September 1957, in favour of his own project, the committee for economic health. Guérillot's committee sought to put an additional 100,000 hectares (250,000 acres) under cultivation between 1958 and 1970 as coffee plantations owned by African families and to construct 77 new factories to treat the additional 50,000 tonnes (49,000 long tons; 55,000 short tons) of coffee resulting from this programme. Guérillot estimated the cost of this project to be 4 billion Central African CFA francs. This cost would be gradually reimbursed, partially by the new owners of the plantations who were expected to repay around 3.5 billion francs of loans, by training fees, and by the factories. Boganda was convinced of the value of this project and took the presidency of the Committee for Economic Health.

Experts pointed out that it would not be possible to provide the required number of plants in a short period of time. In the meantime, therefore, Guérillot undertook to develop the general economy by increasing the amount of cotton and peanuts under cultivation, to increase tax revenues. To achieve these objectives, "controllers" were recruited from amongst the unemployed of Bangui and employed to "motivate" the peasants. Some abuses occurred. The project faced hostility from villagers, village chiefs, and politicians. To pay the "controllers", Guérillot appealed to a "union of capital and labour" in order to obtain capital from the colonists. The colonists were skeptical: the project seemed to take little account of the environmental, sociological and economic conditions of the country. The Committee for Economic Health had to be with the limited assistance offered by the French state, from which Ubangi-Shari borrowed a hundred million CFA francs in March 1958.

=== Ambassador of the Central African Republic ===
==== Loss of support from Boganda ====
For several reasons, Guérillot lost the support of Boganda. In July 1958, the portfolio of administrative affairs—equivalent to the ministry of the interior—was reassigned to David Dacko. In December 1958, Guérillot lost the ministry of economic affairs as well.

As treasurer of Boganda's party, Guérillot had organised a security service for MESAN known as SOM. SOM contained sixty groups, many of which were Europeans, who were paid monthly from the party treasury. They trained on the edge of Bangui in the Mamadou Mbaïki district. Among their officers was the Czech, Otto Šacher, the future director of the Ngaragba Central Prison under David Dacko and Bokassa. Guérillot had justified the existence of the SOM to Abel Goumba as an effective means of ensuring the protection of the ministers and of facilitating Ubangi-Shari's establishment as an independent state, if the French state suffered some sort of disaster. Members of SOM were regularly employed as "controllers" by the Committee for Economic Health. Following complaints from members of SOM about unpaid salaries, an audit of the MESAN treasury revealed that, in addition to emptying the party treasury, Guérillot had been involved in the weapons trade.

Guérillot also came into conflict with Boganda after the latter became aware of his political manoeuvres in spring 1958 to get the seat in the French Senate for Ubangi-Shari vested in Hector Riviérez. Taking advantage of Boganda's absence from Bangui, Guérillot had sought the support of members of the Territorial Assembly of Ubangi-Shari and party members of MESAN. This intrigue deeply angered Boganda. Abel Goumba was finally convinced that through the fuel tax project, Guérillot had intended to collect a personal commission on petrol.

==== Central African ambassador to the west ====
Although he had lost Boganda's favour, Guérillot did not resign his public role and he seems to have been feared by the president of MESAN. He was sent far from Bangui to the post of deputy general delegate to France for Ubangi-Shari, under the authority of Philippe Monin, the general delegate. His mission was to make contact with French and European institutions for the benefit of Ubangi-Shari. Guérillot refused to accept the post until he was promised that his salary would remain at the same rate as his old ministerial salary and that he would be appointed a general delegate, not a deputy general delegate.

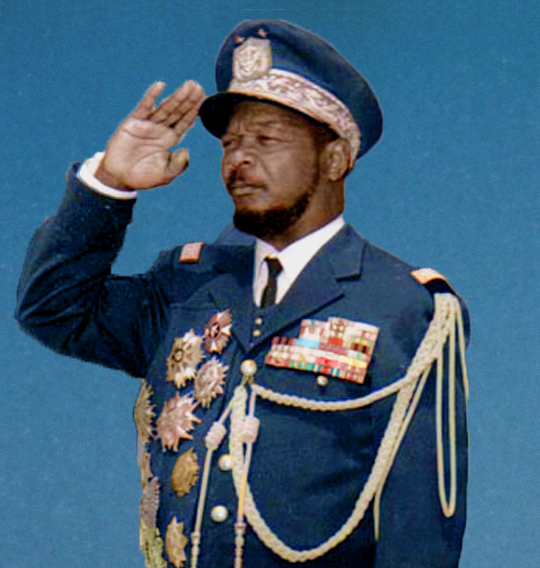
Jean-Bédel Bokassa

This was the beginning of a long diplomatic career in the service of the Central African Republic, the independent state which Ubangi-Shari became on 1 December 1958. This career began in Paris at the general delegation, where Guérillot obtained the voluntary resignation of Philippe Monin. on 1 January 1961, Guérillot saw his mission redefined as simply a commercial delegate attached to the Central African Republic's embassy in Paris. He continued in this role until 13 February 1962. In the meantime, by a decree of 11 October 1961, he obtained Central African citizenship, which was certainly a preliminary to his appointment in February 1962 as permanent ambassador of the Central African Republic to Belgium, Luxembourg and the European Economic Community. From July 1963 to October 1965, he was simultaneously also the ambassador to West Germany. In 1970, in his final appointment, the Central African government relieved him of his role in Brussels to appoint him ambassador to Washington, D.C.

After the death of Boganda in March 1959, Guérillot retained a certain influence within the Central African political scene. He was among those who suggested to David Dacko, Boganda's successor, the idea of entrusting Captain Jean-Bédel Bokassa with the task of organising the new national army. Guérillot got on well with Bokassa. The journalist Pierre Péan reports that Guérillot played a decisive role in Bokassa's fascination with Napoleon Bonaparte.

On 31 October 1971, Roger Guérillot died of a heart attack in a clinic in Uccle, in the suburbs of Brussels. General Bokassa organised his official funeral in Bangui, where he is buried and where a road was renamed in his honour.

== Legacy ==
Roger Guérillot was among the European colonists who supported the transfer of the French colonies to self-government by African politicians, out of opportunism or conviction, and who was appointed by the new African governments to ministerial posts. Among the French colonies, there are parallels in French West Africa (AOF) and Madagascar, as well as French Equatorial Africa (AEF). In the AOF, the former French senator, Georges Monnet, who was close to Félix Houphouët-Boigny, served as Minister of Agriculture in Ivory Coast from 1959 to 1961. In Madagascar, Eugène Lechat, a supporter of Philibert Tsiranana, served as minister of public works continuously from 1959 until May 1972.

In the AEF, Guérillot promoted the model of the Ubangi Liberal Intergroup in the various territories, with a view to the establishment of an AEF Liberal Intergroup. Only French Congo answered this call, following Guérillot's establishment of contact with the local leader, Fulbert Youlou in 1956. On 15 October 1956, the Middle Congo Liberal Intergroup was established by the union of Fulbert Youlou's Democratic Union for the Defense of African Interests and the Union of Middle Congo of colonist Christian Jayle, former director of the cabinet during the Vichy period. This union led to Christian Jayle receiving the post of Secretary of State for Information from Youlou in February 1959, a role which he held until April 1960.
