= Étienne Ngounio =

Central African politician

Étienne Ngounio (also spelled Étienne N'Gounio) was a Central African politician. He became a member of the French Senate in 1958.

== Early life ==
Ngounio was born on 19 October 1920. His place of birth is listed as Limassa near Ouango by historian Jacques Serre and Kembé in his French Senate biography. Serre notes that due to the imprecision of the records at the time, his date of birth is uncertain and that he was likely born some years before 1920. He had his primary education at a Catholic missionary school, and was subsequently privately tutored in Bangassou. This was where he met political activist Barthélemy Boganda, who was undertaking a visit to the town in 1943.

== Political life ==
Ngounio became a follower of Boganda and joined the administration of his Movement for the Social Evolution of Black Africa (MESAN) in 1951. He was elected on the MESAN list as a representative of Mbomou in 1952. He became a member of the Grand Council of French Equatorial Africa in 1957 and aided Boganda in his election as the President of the Council. He became a member of the French Senate in 1958, representing Oubangui-Chari as a member of the Socialist Group. He served as a member of the Committee of Social Affairs and remained in the French Senate until 15 July 1959.

Upon the death of Boganda in 1959, he became the leader of MESAN and was also selected as Boganda's replacement as the Mayor of Bangui, a post that he would hold until 1962. Ngounio presided over the session of the Territorial Assembly in April 1959, tasked with determining a successor to Boganda as the Head of State of the new Central African Republic. He supported Abel Goumba, who was defeated by David Dacko. Dacko himself states that Ngounio was very ambitious and "would have seen himself as the President of the Government".

In July 1960, whilst Ngounio was outside Bangui, Dacko hastily organised a party convention and had himself elected instead of Ngounio as the leader of MESAN. Ngounio was then marginalised in the party by Dacko and was not renominated for election in 1964. He was instead named as a member of the Economic and Social Council, but ended up never attending any meetings there.

== Later life ==
After Jean-Bédel Bokassa, who would go on to proclaim himself the Central African Emperor, seized power in a coup d'état in 1966, he viewed Ngounio as a political opponent. Ngounio was accordingly exiled, being appointed in 1967 as the Head of Customs in Bouar. He was exiled further afield in between 1968 and 1970 to the extreme north of the country, as the Head of Customs in Birao.

He returned to Bangui in 1970 as the Head of Customs at the airport, where he remained in post until at least 1976.

His French Senate biography states that he died on 5 August 1985 in Bangui, whilst Serre states that he died in either 1990 or 1991.
