= Georges Darlan =

Central African politician (1920–1965)

Economic Adviser to Moise Tshombe (Katanga)
- In office 1961–1963

President of the Representative Council
- In office 1949–1952

Ubangian Representative in the Grand Council of French Equatorial Africa
- In office 19 October 1947 – 1952

Councilor for Bangui
- In office 1947–1952

Personal details
- Born: Georges Mandolo; 5 January 1920 Kouango, Ouaka, Ubangi-Shari (present-day Central African Republic)
- Died: 8 June 1965 (aged 45) Bangui, Bangui, Central African Republic
- Party: African Democratic Rally (1959); Ubangi Emancipation (1956-1959); Ubangi Union (1940s - 1950)
- Spouse(s): Laure Muari-Lawula (div. Marie Virginie Samba
- Children: 5, including Danièle
- Relatives: Antoine Darlan (brother)
- Education: École Edouard Renard de Brazzaville
- Military career
- Branch: Free French Forces
- Service years: 1941-1945
- Rank: Staff Sergeant
- Conflicts: World War II

Georges Darlan (5 January 1920, Kouango – 8 June 1965, Bangui) was a Central African politician. He was the president of the Representative Council of Ubangi-Shari from 1949 to 1952, the institutional predecessor of the Central African National Assembly.

== Biography ==
=== Early life (1920–1950) ===
Georges Darlan was born in 1920 in Kouango (Ouaka) in Ubangi-Shari. Officially, his date of birth was January 5, although it is impossible to authenticate that date because, although born of a European father and a Ubangi mother, Georges Darlan was never entered in the civil register of Kouango, which was exclusively used for European citizens. Indeed, like many of mixed race in the colonies, it seems that Darlan's father refused to recognize him or his older brother Antoine Darlan and abandoned them and their African mother.

Thanks to his European ancestry, Georges Darlan was enrolled in school, which was a privilege because during the interwar period the enrollment rate in Ubangi-Shari was 1.5%. His primary education allowed him to join the new institution for indigenous people in French Equatorial Africa, the École Edouard Renard in Brazzaville from 1935. He graduated in 1939 with a teacher's diploma. His assignment in Libreville, Gabon, led him to enlist in the Free French Forces in 1941, from which he was discharged in 1945 with the rank of Staff Sergeant. He returned the following year to Ubangi for a commercial career.

Darlan became very interested in the emerging politics of the colony. After supporting the bishop Barthélemy Boganda in the November 1946 nomination for deputy to the National Assembly of France, he participated in the elections for the newly created Representative Council, on the Economic and Social Action lists for the Native College. His list won all five seats which were up for election. Darlan was elected councilor for Bangui. On 19 October 1947 he was elected general counselor of French Equatorial Africa by his peers, along with his older brother Antoine Darlan.

In August 1947, he was appointed president of the first local political party, the Ubangi Union (UO) founded by Barthélémy Boganda. The UO was a success; its size increased continuously. Darlan used this organization to introduce cooperatives of cotton producers (COTONCOOP) and of consumers (SOCOOMA) in 1948. Soon a patronage system formed around Darlan and he became the strongman of Ubangi-Shari. His influence over local officials was encouraged by the colonial administration. In 1948, while the majority of indigenous advisers were moving toward the African Democratic Rally (RDA) under the influence of his very liberal brother Antoine Darlan, Georges Darlan, who was more liberal, exerted all his influence to prevent this movement to the left. Only candidates elected in Bangui joined the RDA. The candidates elected from rural areas chose Georges Darlan to be the head of the Representative Council in 1949.

=== Ambitions and setbacks, the woes of COTONCOOP (1950–1951) ===
Georges Darlan had ambitions of being elected as the deputy to the French National Assembly, in place of Barthélemy Boganda, with whom his relations had deteriorated. The break occurred in September 1948, when the Representative Council refused to grant a charter to Boganda's cooperative, SOCOULOLÉ, although it had granted one to COTONCOOP a few months earlier. Feeling a sense of betrayal, Boganda resigned from the UO one month later. The UO survived until 1950. In that year, the president of the Representative Council decided to refocus on COTONCOOP, a more flexible body with 24,000 members, whose executives were politically close to him.

The COTONCOOP did not last very long. In July 1950, the Representative Council was surprised to discover that the collection of contributions is made almost mandatory in some areas "in the government's name". Strong criticism was levelled at its financial management. Of the thirty-two million CFA francs of subsidies granted by the Representative Council, twenty million were squandered; nine million in the purchase of real estate in Bangui, the rest in various construction projects, purchasing of plants, and management fees. In 1951, during the election campaign, the government took control of the company on account of the number of complaints. The reports sent to the Head of Planning and the Governor General of French Equatorial Africa went without appeal; all the company business operations had been performed in vain.

Despite these setbacks, Georges Darlan was still considered by the administration to be the main opponent of Boganda in the legislative election of 17 June. But his controversial actions in his co-operatives and the fact that he had presided over a tax increase while president of the Representative Council were easily exploited by Boganda. Darlan was discredited by Boganda's campaign tactics. On 17 June, he came in third place with 8,288 votes, a mere 12.6% of the electorate.

=== Political failures and move to Congo (1952–1965) ===
In 1952, Georges Darlan decided not to stand in the territorial elections. His withdrawal from political life lasted until 1956. In that year, he founded a party, Ubangi Emancipation, and ran unsuccessfully in the Bangui municipal election against Boganda.

In 1957, Georges Darlan reversed his attitude to the RDA and participated in the reformation of the Ubangi section. Boganda then accused him being a "messenger of Moscow", a false attack since, from 1950 onwards, the RDA had a liberal orientation. In 1959, the founding leader of the RDA, Félix Houphouët-Boigny of Côte d'Ivoire, chose Darlan to lead the RDA campaign in the parliamentary elections of April in the Central African Republic (the name of Ubangi-Shari after December 1958), instead of his brother Antoine Darlan. The RDA obtained 2.4% of the votes and no seats in these elections. Darlan fell out of favor with Houphouët-Boigny, who turned his attention to the leader of Congo-Brazzaville, Fulbert Youlou. Georges Darlan was ousted in favor of Kobozo, an unknown.

Georges Darlan left the Central African political scene in 1960 and moved to the former Belgian Congo. In 1961, he became the economic adviser to Moise Tshombe in his secessionist government of Katanga. The adventure seemed to have come to an end in 1963 when he settled as a merchant in Brazzaville. But beginning in 1965, accused of political activity on behalf of Tshombe, the Congo-Brazzaville authorities expelled him to Bangui, where the President of the Central African Republic David Dacko imprisoned Darlan on arrival, probably to discourage him from resuming political activity. He was set free after a few weeks.

On 8 June 1965, George Darlan died, while attempting to set up a business in Bangui. Abel Goumba raises the possibility of an assassination: Darlan is said to have drunken a "glass" in the company of a young woman, become ill suddenly, and been hurriedly returned home, where he died. For Goumba, the circumstances are similar to the murder by poisoning of the Cameroonian opposition leader Félix-Roland Moumié in Geneva in 1960. The Dictionary of African Biography (2011) claims his death was due to a brain hemorrhage.

Darlan's daughter Danièle is a law professor who was President of the Constitutional Court of the Central African Republic from 2017 to 2022.
