= 1946–47 Gabonese Representative Council election =

Representative Council elections were held in French Gabon in December 1946 and January 1947.

== Electoral system ==
The Representative Council consisted of 30 members, of which 12 were elected by the First College and 18 by the Second College.

== Results ==
The Second College seats were won by candidates nominated after the French authorities had consulted with traditional chiefs.
