= Vincent de Paul Nyonda =

Gabonese playwright and Minister

Vincent de Paul Nyonda (1918 – 20 January 1995) was a Gabonese playwright and Minister.

Nyonda served under the administration of the first Gabonese President Léon M'ba, and was a prominent political figure in that administration. He served as Minister of Public Works from 1957 until 1962 and as Minister of Justice from 1963 to 1964.

== Biography ==
Following President Léon Mba's sudden and suspicious death, Omar Bongo took over as head of state. Some suspect the involvement of the French government, determined to control this oil-rich nation. When Vincent de Paul Nyonda refused to join the new government, one he deemed illegitimate, Omar Bongo ordered his arrest. Nyonda endured weeks of torture, but a decision was made to spare his life. He was sent to a village and cut from his electoral base.

In the small village of Mandji, away from the luxurious life that his social status had provided, he learnt to live a much simpler life. He built his house with the help of a few volunteers. He learn to hunt and grow vegetables to provide for his family.

It is in Mandji that Nyonda developed a passion for writing. He wrote and produced a number of plays starring villagers turned stage actors. It is during one such performance that Mrs. Josephine Bongo, who was touring the province of Ngounie, had the opportunity see one of his plays. Upon returning to Libreville, she convinced her husband, President Omar Bongo, to allow Nyonda back to Libreville.

Nyonda eventually returned to the capital. Rather than return to politics however, Nyonda chose to devote his life to his writing. He ultimately became a successful playwright and was dubbed, rightfully so, the "Father of the Gabonese Theater". Echoing Shakespeare, his favorite quote was: "Tout est théâtralité" ("life is a stage").

Nyonda died in Libreville, Gabon on 20 January 1995 at the age of 78. His autobiography Du villageois au minister, published by L'Harmattan of Paris in 1993, depicts his incredible life as a politician, a writer, and a family man. The Gabonese university has since renamed several facilities after the author. Many African literary prizes also bear his name.

== Published works ==
- Bonjour, Bessieux! Libreville: Impriga, n.d.
- Le combat de Mbombi: tragi-comédie en XII scènes Libreville: [V. Nyonda], 1977.
- La mort de Guykafi: Drame en cinq actes; suivi de deux albinos à la M'Passa; et le soûlard (Collection of Plays), Paris: L'Harmattan, 1981. ISBN 2-85802-184-8
- Epopée Mulombi contée par Ambroisine Mawiri et Victor Mbumba; écrite et arrangée par Vincent de Paul Nyonda. Gabon: s.n., 1986?-
- Le roi Mouanga: tragédie en VI actes Gabon: V. de P. Nyonda, [1988].
- Autobiographie d'un Gabonais: Du villageois au ministre (autobiography), Paris: L'Harmattan, 1993. ISBN 2-7384-1743-4
- Nyonda et le théâtre [Gabon]: V. de P. Nyonda, [1994]

== Legacy ==
- The Vincent de Paul Nyonda Novel Prize (won in 2000 by Mariama Ndoye)
