= Louis Sanmarco =

French-Gabonese politician (1912–2009)

Personal details
- Born: 7 April 1912 Martigues, France
- Died: 9 October 2009 (aged 97) Paris, France'

Louis Sanmarco (April 7, 1912 – October 9, 2009) was a French colonial administrator of Italian origin. He served as the governor of the colony of Ubangi-Shari from 1954 until 1957, and served as Governor of Gabon from 29 January 1958 to 28 November 1958. As Governor of Gabon, he pushed for the incorporation of Gabon into France as an overseas department. He then served as High Commissioner of Gabon from 1958 to 1959. He was born in Martigues and died in Paris.
