= Antoine Darlan =

Central African politician and trade unionist (1915–1974)

- Born: 1915; Kouango, French West Africa
- Died: 10 April 1974 (aged 58–59); Villejuif, France
- Occupation: Politician
- Years active: 1946–1962

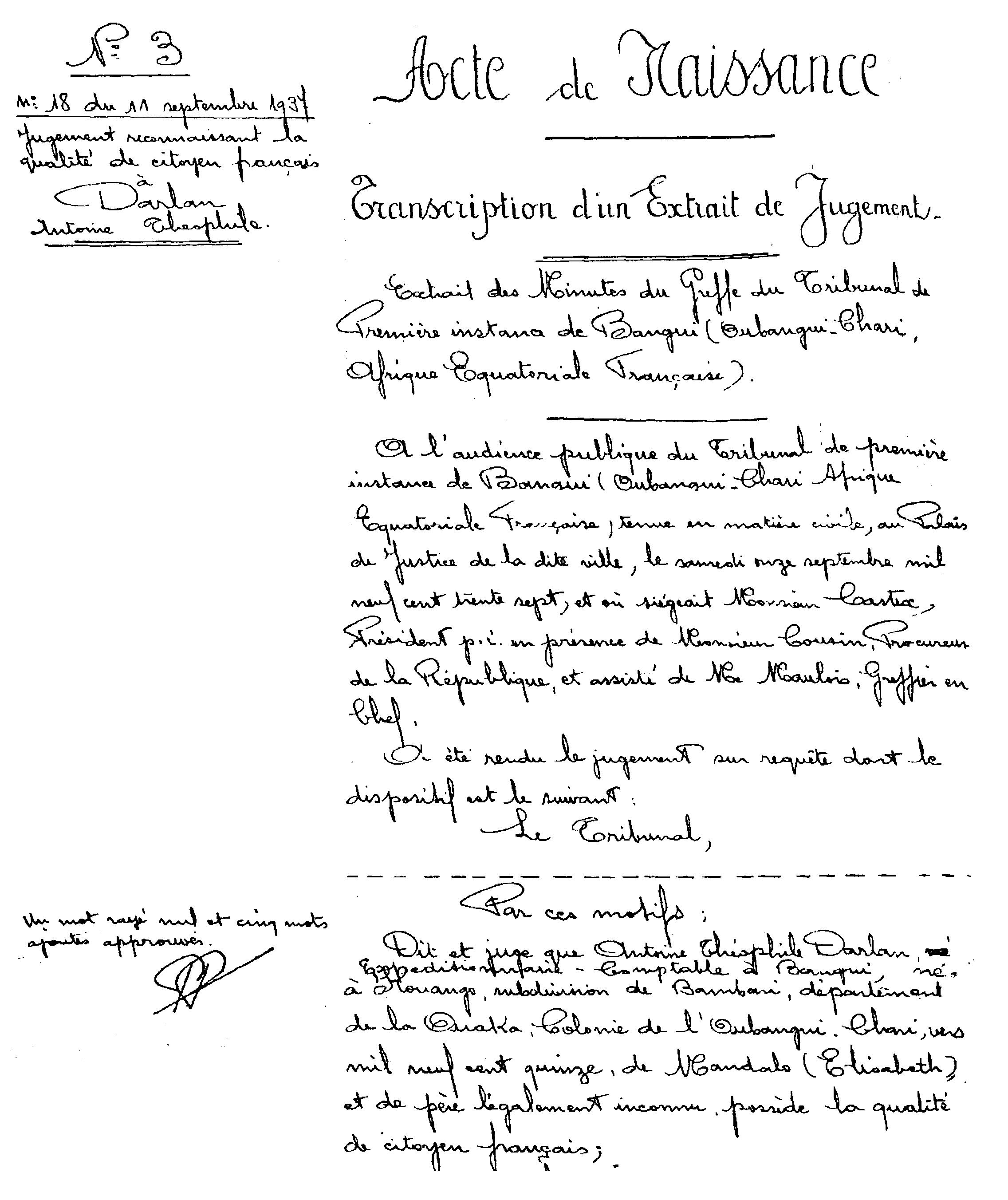
French citizenship form for Darlan

Antoine Théophile Darlan (1915 – 10 April 1974) was a Central African politician and trade unionist, known for being the local chief of the Rassemblement démocratique africain (RDA) party in Ubangi-Shari prior to independence.

== Biography ==
Darlan was born in 1915 in Kouango to Elizabeth Mandalo, an African, and Joseph Darlan, a European of Portuguese origin. Although his official date of birth according to the Kouango birth registry was 8 June, it is impossible to know his true date of birth with certainty. His father never recognized him, and Darlan did not become a French citizen until 11 September 1937.

Being of mixed race, Darlan had easy access to education and joined the colonial administration as a bookkeeper. Darlan also became a political activist through involvement with the Ubangi Association and the Association of Métis. In 1941 as a French citizen, he was drafted in the Free French forces. He received a Colonial Medal for his wartime service.

=== Entering politics ===
The end of World War II led to liberalization of colonial society. On 15 December 1946, for the first time an election for a Representative Council was organized in the colony. Darlan ran on the Action économique et sociale ticket and was elected alongside his younger brother Georges. His peers choose him on 19 October 1947 to represent Ubangi-Shari in the French West Africa Federal Council in Brazzaville and at the French Union in Versailles. According to historian Pierre Kalck, Darlan was close to Barthélemy Boganda, who had been elected to represent Ubangi-Shari in the French National Assembly in November 1946.

At the end of 1947 Darlan was elected to the vice presidency of the Grand Council of French Equatorial Africa. He was deemed more intelligent and level-headed than his brother Georges, and was admired for his moderate approach. On 19 December 1947, he proposed at the podium of the Grand Council to substitute the term "French Equatorial Africa" with "Equatorial France", a measure that was adopted unanimously by the Council. However, the French government did not follow it though. Darlan began to disagree with the Socialists on colonial policy, and in 1948 joined the Rassemblement démocratique africain (RDA), an inter-African movement affiliated with the communists.

=== Leader of the RDA in Ubangi-Shari ===
On 23 December 1948 he formed an Ubangian section of the RDA, which he chaired. In this capacity, he participated in the Second International Congress of the RDA, organized in January 1949 in Abidjan. Darlan's faction became a relative success. His influence on the Second College members of the Representative Council was significant. But his anticolonial opinions earned him the enmity of the colonial administration and members of the European members of the Council. His African colleagues, led by his brother George, joined with the Europeans in 1949 to reject his demands for subsidies, which they claimed were for propaganda purposes. His faction began losing members starting in June. Losing influence among elites, Darlan turned to the working class. He hardened his rhetoric and turned his actions towards unionism. From then on he was very close to the General Confederation of Labour. In 1950, while the RDA broke with the French Communist Party, Darlan still promoted far-left politics.

Despite their opposing stances, his parliamentary actions were relatively similar with that of the Christian Democrat MP and anti-communist Boganda. Both strongly denounced colonial abuses. In his articles published in the local organ of the RDA, AEF Nova, he adopted strong positions similar to those of Boganda: on 6 February 1949 Darlan wrote "Our people are subjected to an odious exploitation. In this Ubangui with riches so varied and plentiful, the European element is considered as belonging to the superior race, the master race. The reactionary administration in the service of the colonial trusts has subjected the country to a reign of terror."

In early 1952 a leadership dispute arose between them. Boganda's popularity and electoral success meant he prevailed. In the 1952 Territorial Assembly elections Darlan was the only incumbent from the Second College to be re-elected, having run on the list of Bogdanda's Movement for the Social Evolution of Black Africa (MESAN) party. That same year, he left the Ubangian section of the RDA to join MESAN.

=== Alliance with Boganda ===
Despite becoming Boganda's deputy, their relationship remained delicate. Darlan was critical of Boganda's working methods, considering them too personal and not democratic. Boganda for his part, was wary of Darlan because of his popularity among the working class and intellectuals. Not reappointed to the Grand Council of French Equatorial Africa, Darlan was sidelined from the local political scene. He focused on his position of Councillor to the Assembly of the French Union, to which he was re-elected in October 1953 under the RDA ticket. He had indeed never broken with this party, and continued to attend its major meetings.

Darlan was a man who seemed to adapt to all situations. In 1955, despite his political beliefs, he accepted the co-vice-presidency of the Liberal Intergroup Ubangian (ILO) with Boganda and representatives of business, René Naud and Roger Guérillot. On 23 November 1956 he was elected deputy mayor of Bambari as a member of MESAN. In March 1957 he was re-elected to the Territorial Assembly, and in May returned to the Grand Council of French Equatorial Africa, again on a MESAN ticket.

However, on 19 September 1957 Darlan was expelled from MESAN. It seems that this decision was made by Guérillot. Boganda did not find this too hard to accept; he blamed Darlan not only for his membership in the RDA and former communist training, but also his mixed-race heritage. Sooner or later Boganda believed, Darlan would be conspiring with others to take power, like mulattos during the Haitian Revolution. This dismissal began the decline of his political career.

=== Later life ===
In March 1958 the RDA pushed Darlan to run for the presidency of the Grand Council against Boganda. After much hesitation, Darlan withdrew. Five months after the adoption of the French Community, the Assembly of the French Union dissolved. On 24 and 25 November 1958 Darlan participated in the Brazzaville meeting to decide on the fate of French Equatorial Africa. On this issue, he fell into the camp of the Federalists with Leopold Senghor and Boganda, opposed to separatist ideas championed by the leader of the RDA, Felix Houphouët-Boigny.

Beginning in June 1958, Darlan was once again a member of the Ubangian section of the RDA that had been reconstituted in 1957 among others by his brother George. Darlan quickly took control along with Hilaire Kotalimbora and turned it further to the left. This was unacceptable to Houphouet-Boigny, who campaigned against him in the April 1959 parliamentary elections. Darlan was subsequently replaced as head of the RDA by George. The elections were a disaster for the RDA, with MESAN won all 48 seats. The Ubangian section of the RDA fell into a deep crisis in the spring of 1959. Meanwhile Boganda died and a conflict between his proteges ensued. Darlan agreed with the democratic changes in Central Africa Movement (MEDAC) of Abel Goumba to counter the new strongman of MESAN, David Dacko. But this theoretical agreement ended when the MÉDAC dissolved the Council of Ministers at the order of Dacko on December 23, 1960. In 1962 it was his turn to see its RDA section dissolved with the institutionalization of the single party.

Withdrawing permanently from political life, Darlan turned instead to public service. Assigned to the Treasury and Finance Department of the Ministry of Foreign Affairs and finally the Planning Commission, Darlan had a stable job where his qualities were appreciated. Transferred to France for medical treatment, he died in the hospital of Villejuif on 10 April 1974. He was buried in the cemetery of Ndress in Bangui in the 7th arrondissement. Since 1980, following a decision by (now president) Dacko, an avenue was named in his honor to pay tribute to his political career. This avenue starts from the central police station and crossing the "200 Villas" and the Avenue of Martyrs to reach Benzvil neighborhoods and Castors.
