= Loi-cadre Defferre =

1956 French legal reform of its colonies' governments

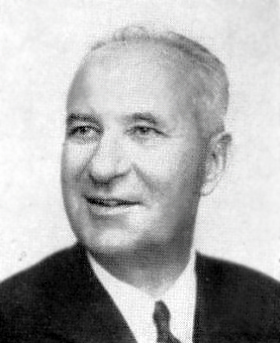
Gaston Defferre (1910-1986)

The loi-cadre (Reform Act) was a French legal reform passed by the French National Assembly on 23 June 1956, named after overseas minister Gaston Defferre. It marked a turning point in relations between France and its overseas empire. Under pressure from independence movements in the colonies, the government transferred a number of powers from Paris to elected territorial governments in French African colonies and also removed remaining voting inequalities by implementing universal suffrage and abolishing the multiple electoral college system. It was the first step in the creation of the French Community, comparable to the British Commonwealth of Nations. Most French African colonies held elections under the new universal suffrage Loi Cadre system on 31 March 1957, the exceptions being Cameroon which held its election on 23 December 1956, and Togo which held its election on 17 April 1958 (Cameroon and Togo, being UN trust territories, were subject to a different legal regime).
