= Jean Félix-Tchicaya =

Congolese politician (1903–1961)

1st MP for Middle Congo and the Gabon in the French National Assembly
- In office June 2, 1946 – July 15, 1959
- Preceded by: Office created
- Succeeded by: Fulbert Youlou

Personal details
- Born: November 9, 1903 Libreville, Gabon
- Died: January 15, 1961 (aged 57) Pointe-Noire, Republic of Congo (RC))
- Resting place: Loango, Republic of Congo
- Citizenship: France (French)
- Party: Congolese Progressive Party
- Other political affiliations: African Democratic Rally
- Children: Tchicaya U Tam'si
- Parents: Makosso Tchicaya (father); Antoinette Ngouamba Portella (mother)
- Relatives: Aleth Félix-Tchicaya
- Occupation: Politician
- Profession: Teacher, accountant
- Committees: L'Harmonie de Pointe-Noire

Jean Félix-Tchicaya was a Congolese politician in the French colony of Middle Congo. He was born in Libreville on November 9, 1903, and was a member of the royal family of the Kingdom of Loango.

In 1945, he was elected as the first deputy for Middle-Congo and the Gabon in the French National Assembly, a seat he retained until the end of the French Fourth Republic. He helped found the Congolese Progressive Party (PPC), a Congolese branch of the African Democratic Rally, in 1946.

He died in Pointe Noire on January 15, 1961, seeing his rival Fulbert Youlou gain power over a newly independent Republic of Congo.

== Early life ==
Born at Libreville from the prominent Vili-speaking Congolese Bulolo clan, originally coming from the settlement of Diosso, Jean Félix-Tchicaya studied at the small public school in Libreville.

Louis Mbouyou Portella, his grand father was one of the wealthiest traders of Loango area at that time.

In the late nineteenth and early twentieth century, many people from coastal Congo-Brazzaville moved to Libreville and Grand-Bassam. Moreover, until independence in 1960, Gabonese and Congolese intellectuals and white collar workers regularly moved back and forth from Brazzaville to Libreville.

Thus, Tchicaya father's like many of his immigrants fellows, worked as a tailor, - a noble work at that time among Vili people like tusk carver-.

In 1918, according to his intellectual ability, Tchicaya received a scholarship to study at Ecole William Ponty in Gorée Island, near from Dakar, the most highly regarded public school in all of French West and Equatorial Africa.

During his stay in Dakar from 1918 to 1921, future African French parliamentary deputies and major political figures such as Félix Houphouët-Boigny, Mamba Sano, numbered among his classmates. Lamine Gueye another future African French parliamentary deputy was their teacher in mathematics.

Once completed his schooling in 1921 along with his cousin Hervé-Mapako Gnali (Mambou Aimée Gnali father's), becoming the first Congolese teachers, he returned to Libreville to teach classes at a primary school. Following his grand father advice, he left this position in 1924 to join the giant Congo Ocean Railway project.

== Political career ==
=== L'Harmonie de Pointe-Noire ===
Jean Félix-Tchicaya founded a musical and social group called 'L'Harmonie de Pointe-Noire' and coauthored petitions claiming improving right for Western educated Africans. Among the successes was the freedom and the recovering of the Ma-Loango Moe "Kata Matou" AKA Moe Poaty II or N'Gangue M'Voumbe Tchiboukil, the traditional ruler of Vili speaking clans of Kingdom of Loango. This ruler ascended to the throne in 1923 and was deposed in 1926 by the colonial administration for restoring the poison of the ordeal (NKassa in Vili language). The removal of the French official whose policies was seen detrimental to Vili people was another success of Tchicaya.

In the wake of the Communist-Socialist Popular Front electoral victory in France in 1936, Tchicaya had the organizational ability and the connections to take advantage of the mild reforms that came to French Equatorial Africa. Joseph Reste, his Governor General set up a council of administration with some position for elected African representative s.

In 1937 and 1939, Tchicaya led the victorious campaign of the mixed-race Vili man Louis Oliveira. This allowed a formal venue for indigenous elite in politics although this council could not contravene the colonial administration.

=== First election to the Constituent National Assembly ===
At the end of the World War II, France was bloodless. Through a Constituent assembly, it is putting in place new institutions to revive the political activity of the country. The representativeness of France is then extended to the Overseas territories such as the AEF, whose indigenous people have the possibility of electing representatives. While the old colonies like the West Indies elect their deputies by universal suffrage, FEA (French Equatorial Africa) and FWA (French Western Africa), have two separate electoral colleges: the first reserved for metropolitan citizens and the second for non-citizens. Gabon and the Middle Congo, because of their small population, constitute a single electoral district for the election of a member for this second college.

In the process of being demobilized from the French colonial army, Jean-Félix Tchicaya is contacted by the notables of Pointe-Noire, by telegram, to apply for the territory of Gabon-Middle Congo.

On December 7, 1945, after a second round, Jean Félix-Tchicaya was elected member of the assembly, edging out Jean-Hilaire Aubame, Jacques Opangault, Issembé and François-Moussa Simon.

=== Congolese Progressive Party ===
==== Foundation of the party ====
In 1946, Jean Félix-Tchicaya, slayer of Colonialism at the French National Assembly, where he sits throughout the 4th Republic, founded his party the CPP (Congolese Progressive Party), Congolese section of the African Democratic Rally, close to the French Communist Party, with young executives such as Emmanuel Damongo-Dadet, Joseph Pouabou or Robert Stéphane Tchitchelle. The latter, the right-hand of the founder, will be the leader of the party in Pointe-Noire and Kouilou. He rallies all the railroaders of the CFCO (Congo-Ocean railway).

Jean Félix-Tchicaya is the vice-Chairman of the Coordinating Committee for the very recent African Democratic Rally (RDA) of his friend Félix Houphouët-Boigny.

The talisman of the party was the leopard in reference to the affiliation of Tchicaya to the reigning family of the Kingdom of Loango.

==== Split of the party and end of reign ====
In November 1955, after the budgetary session of the Territorial Assembly, a dissent appeared within the CPP. In the course of a confab held in Pointe-Noire, in the presence of the leader Tchicaya, in the Mpita property of Germain Bicoumat, a notable Vili man, several territorial councillors resign from the party. They reproach Tchicaya for its lack of consultation in some decisions (appointment of elected officials to positions of responsibility, the dissimilarity of CPP in the RDA following the accession of Fulbert Youlou).

These are the elected representatives of the Niari department: Simon-Pierre Kikhounga-Ngot, Auguste Nzoungou, Raymond Ango; Of the elected representatives of the Pool department: Prosper Decorad, Louis Vouama, Toundé Néré, Jean Maniaki, Nicolas Bakala and the elected member of the Kouilou department: Robert Stéphane Tchitchelle.

Tchitchellé joined Abbé Youlou to establish the UDDIA (Democratic Union for the defence of African interests). The latter party, by mobilizing the laris politically, takes political leadership on the CPP. and allowed Stéphane Tchitchelle to become the first indigenous mayor of Pointe-Noire, before occupying several ministerial positions.

All these events will mark the eclipse of Jean Félix-Tchicaya and his party the CPP after more than ten years of reign without discontinuing on the political chessboard.
