= Congolese Progressive Party =

Congolese Progressive Party Parti progressiste congolais
- General Secretary: Aubert-Lucien Lounda
- Founder: Jean-Félix Tchicaya
- Founded: 1945
- International affiliation: RDA (until 1957); PRA (from 1958)

The Congolese Progressive Party (French: Parti progressiste congolais, PPC) was a political party in Congo-Brazzaville. It was the first Congolese political party (founded by Jean-Félix Tchicaya in 1945), and the Congolese section of the African Democratic Rally (RDA). Until 1950 PPC was closely connected to the French Communist Party. The party was largely based amongst the Vili people. Aubert-Lucien Lounda was the General Secretary of the party.

Many of the activists of the CGT trade union movement in Congo (which later became an independent trade union centre, CGAT) were members of the PPC. The party had youth and women's sections, but these were not very active. PPC published AEF Nouvelle between 1947 and 1949.

PPC won the 1946 French National Assembly election in Moyen-Congo, obtaining 46% of the votes. Tchicaya was elected Member of Parliament. In the first Moyen-Congo Representative Council election, held in 1947, PPC got 62,5% of the votes. PPC got 15 seats in the council, whilst French Section of the Workers' International (SFIO) got 9. When the Communist Party was expelled from the French government in May 1947, it had repercussions in the PPC as well. The PPC suffered a series of disagreements as a result.

PPC remained the most voted party in the 1951 French National Assembly election, winning 44% of the votes. In the 1952 Moyen-Congo Representative Council election PPC got 34% of the votes.

Two future Congolese statesmen, Fulbert Youlou and Alphonse Massamba-Débat, were members of the PPC at the time. In 1956 they both left the party, and joined UDDIA. With Youlou's rise to political prominence, the influence of PPC declined. In the 1956 municipal elections in Brazzaville, PPC got 2,478 and three seats (out of 37). In the PPC stronghold of Pointe-Noire, the party mustered to get 8 seats.

In March 1957 a PPC-African Socialist Movement (MSA) alliance was formed. The PPC-MSA bloc obtained a majority, 25 seats (out of whom two seats were held by PPC), in the new Territorial Assembly of Moyen-Congo. A government led by the MSA leader Jacques Opangault was formed. But the alliance between PPC and MSA would not last. In September 1957 the majority fell apart, and UDDIA formed a new government. In the same year, the RDA had broken its links with PPC and sided with UDDIA. After the break with RDA, the PPC aligned itself with the African Regroupment Party (PRA).
