= Rally of the French People =

Rally of the French People Rassemblement du peuple français
- President: Jacques Foccart
- Founder: Charles de Gaulle
- Founded: 14 April 1947
- Dissolved: 13 September 1955
- Succeeded by: National Centre of Social Republicans
- Headquarters: Paris
- Membership (1948): 500,000
- Ideology: French nationalism Conservatism; Souverainism; Gaullism; Anti-communism
- Political position: Right-wing
- Colours: Blue, white, red
- National Assembly (1951): 121 / 625

Party flag

The Rally of the French People (French: Rassemblement du Peuple Français [ʁasɑ̃bləmɑ̃ dy pœpl fʁɑ̃sɛ], RPF) was a right-wing French political party, existing from 1947 to 1955 and led by Charles de Gaulle.

== Foundation ==
The RPF was founded by Charles de Gaulle in Strasbourg on 14 April 1947, one year after his resignation from the presidency of the provisional government and four months after the proclamation of the Fourth Republic. It advocated a constitutional revision establishing a presidential government. For de Gaulle, the "regime of the parties" which characterized the parliamentary system did not permit the advent of a strong and efficient state. However, in French Republican culture, democracy and parliamentary sovereignty were inseparable. De Gaulle was accused of wanting to establish a Bonapartist government, with himself as the single dominant ruler.

As de Gaulle also opposed the parties on the basis that they served particular interests and divided the nation, he wanted the RPF to be a "rally," not a political party, and allowed members of other parties (except Communists and former Vichy regime supporters) to join without compromising their other membership, but this hope was never realized. By 1948, the party counted half a million members, just behind the Communist Party. The RPF was able to gain the support of Maurrasien royalists (of the Action Française), leftist republicans such as André Malraux, moderates, Christian democrats such as Edmond Michelet, radicals such as Jacques Chaban-Delmas and Michel Debré, and even socialists and communists. Nevertheless, most of its voters came from the right-wing electorate.

== Electoral record ==
The party enjoyed success in municipal elections (1947), capturing the cities of Lille, Marseille, Bordeaux (with Jacques Chaban-Delmas), Strasbourg, Rennes, Versailles, Le Mans, and Nancy with over 35% of votes. In Paris in 1947, Pierre de Gaulle, the brother of the General, became President of the municipal council, a post similar to mayor. However, the RPF's performance in the Christian Democratic MRP strongholds of rural France was relatively mediocre. Parliamentarians hostile to the RPF delayed cantonal elections in the fear of another Gaullist breakthrough. The hostility of the media and the social events of 1947 limited the party's electoral success.

The 1949 cantonal elections, albeit delayed in fear of an RPF breakthrough, produced another RPF victory (although smaller than the victory in the municipal elections).

The 1951 election was a relative success for the RPF, but the electoral law (apparentements), created to favor the Third Force coalition (MRP, SFIO, RGR etc.) over the anti-Fourth Republic parties (RPF and the Communists), limited the Gaullist breakthrough. It obtained over 4 million votes (22.3%) and 117 seats. It had hoped for over 200 seats, which the apparentements prevented.

== Political defeats ==
With only 117 seats, the RPF had little influence on decision making in the new Assembly. In 1952, 27 deputies voted in favor of Antoine Pinay's government before being excluded. Later, 45 other deputies left the Gaullist party. Following the loss of numerous cities, including Marseille and Lille, in the 1953 municipal elections, the party's decline started. Many people blamed its defeats on an authoritarian party leadership. De Gaulle asked the Gaullist deputies to abandon the name "RPF", then in June 1953, five Gaullist deputies joined Joseph Laniel's government. In 1954, the vote of Gaullists and Communists lead to the defeat of the European Defence Community treaty.

On 13 September 1955, the party was officially dissolved. The Gaullist deputies founded the National Centre of Social Republicans without the backing of de Gaulle. Most would go on to form the Union for the New Republic and help create the Fifth Republic in 1958.

== Leadership ==
- 1947–1951: Jacques Soustelle
- 1952–1954: Louis Terrenoire
- 1954–1955: Jacques Foccart

== See also ==
- Rally for France
