= List of current finance ministers =

This is a list of current finance ministers of the 193 United Nations member states, Holy See (Vatican City) and the State of Palestine.

Finance ministers of sovereign countries with limited recognition are included in a separate table.

== States recognised by the United Nations ==
State	List	Current finance minister	Political affiliation	Assumed office
Afghanistan	List	Nasir Akhund (acting)	Taliban	30 May 2023
Albania	List	Petrit Malaj	PS	30 July 2024
Algeria	List	Abdelkrim Bouzred	Independent	2 February 2025
Andorra	List	Cesar Marquina	DA	January 2023
Angola	List	Vera Daves	MPLA	8 October 2019
Antigua and Barbuda	List	Gaston Browne (prime minister)	ABLP	13 June 2014
Argentina	List	Luis Caputo	PRO	10 December 2023
Armenia	List	Vahe Hovhannisyan	Civil Contract	20 December 2022
Australia	List	Jim Chalmers	Labor	23 May 2022
Austria	List	Markus Marterbauer	Independent	3 March 2025
Azerbaijan	List	Sahil Babayev	New Azerbaijan	6 February 2025
Bahamas	List	Philip Davis (prime minister)	PLP	17 September 2021
Bahrain	List	Salman bin Khalifa Al Khalifa	—N/a (Note: The polity to which this finance minister belongs has either banned political parties or does not have any.)	4 December 2018
Bangladesh	List	Amir Khasru Mahmud Chowdhury	BNP	17 February 2026
Barbados	List	Mia Mottley (prime minister)	BLP	25 May 2018
Belarus	List	Yury Seliverstov	Independent	4 June 2020
Belgium	List	Jan Jambon	N-VA	3 February 2025
Belize	List	John Briceño (prime minister)	PUP	12 November 2020
Benin	List	Romuald Wadagni	Independent	6 April 2016
Bhutan	List	Lekey Dorji	PDP	28 January 2024
Bolivia	List	Marcelo Montenegro	MAS-IPSP	9 November 2020
Bosnia and Herzegovina	List	Srđan Amidžić	SNSD	22 August 2023
Botswana	List	Ndaba Gaolathe (vice-president)	AP	11 November 2024
Brazil	List	Dario Durigan	Independent	20 March 2026
Brunei	List	Hassanal Bolkiah (monarch)	—N/a	26 February 1997
Brunei	List	Amin Liew Abdullah (second minister)	—N/a	30 January 2018
Bulgaria	List	Temenuzhka Petkova	GERB	16 January 2025
Burkina Faso	List	Aboubacar Nacanabo	MPP	21 October 2022
Burundi	List	Alain Ndikumana	CNDD–FDD	5 August 2025
Cambodia	List	Aun Pornmoniroth	CPP	26 September 2013
Cameroon	List	Louis-Paul Motazé	RDPC	2 March 2018
Canada	List	François-Philippe Champagne	Liberal	14 March 2025
Cape Verde	List	Olavo Correia	MpD	22 April 2016
Central African Republic	List	Hervé Ndoba	Independent	10 June 2021
Chad	List	Tahir Hamid Nguilin	MPS	21 November 2017
Chile	List	Jorge Quiroz	Independent	11 March 2026
China	List	Lan Fo'an	Communist	24 October 2023
Colombia	List	Germán Ávila Plazas	Humane Colombia	18 March 2025
Comoros	List	Ibrahim Mohamed Abdourazak	Independent	2024
Congo, Democratic Republic of the	List	Doudou Fwamba Likonde	UDPS	12 June 2024
Congo, Republic of the	List	Calixte Ganongo	PCT	30 April 2016
Costa Rica	List	Nogui Acosta Jaén	PAC	8 May 2022
Croatia	List	Marko Primorac	Independent	15 July 2022
Cuba	List	Vladimir Regueiro	PCC	20 April 2023
Cyprus	List	Makis Keravnos	DIKO	1 March 2023
Czech Republic	List	Alena Schillerová	ANO	15 December 2025
Denmark	List	Peter Hummelgaard	Social Democrats	27 June 2019
Djibouti	List	Ilyas Moussa Dawaleh	RPP	10 May 2011
Dominica	List	Irving McIntyre	DLP	13 December 2022
Dominican Republic	List	José Manuel Vicente Dubocq	PRM	16 August 2020
East Timor	List	Santina Cardoso	Independent	1 July 2023
Ecuador	List	Juan Carlos Vera	Independent	24 November 2023
Egypt	List	Ahmed Kouchouk	Independent	1 July 2024
El Salvador	List	Jerson Posada	Independent	18 July 2023
Equatorial Guinea	List	Gabriel Mbega Obiang Lima	PDGE	2 February 2023
Eritrea	List	Berhane Habtemariam	PFDJ	2014
Estonia	List	Jürgen Ligi	Reform	23 July 2024
Eswatini	List	Neal Rijkenberg	Independent	6 November 2018
Ethiopia	List	Ahmed Shide	Prosperity Party	18 October 2018
Fiji	List	Biman Prasad	NFP	24 December 2022
Finland	List	Riikka Purra	Finns	20 June 2023
France	List	Roland Lescure	RE	5 October 2025
Gabon	List			
Gambia	List	Mambury Njie	UDP	9 July 2018
Georgia	List	Lasha Khutsishvili	Georgian Dream	1 April 2021
Germany	List	Lars Klingbeil	SPD	6 May 2025
Ghana	List	Cassiel Ato Forson	NDC	22 January 2025
Greece	List	Kyriakos Pierrakakis	ND	14 March 2025
Grenada	List	Dennis Cornwall	NDC	28 April 2023
Guatemala	List	Jonathan Menkos	Semilla	19 January 2024
Guinea	List	Mourana Soumah	Independent	2024
Guinea-Bissau	List	Suleimane Seidi	PRS	December 2022
Guyana	List	Ashni Singh	PPP/C	5 November 2020
Haiti	List	Ketleen Florestal	Independent	12 June 2024
Holy See	List	Maximino Caballero Ledo	—N/a	30 November 2022
Honduras	List	Christian Duarte	Libre	10 September 2024
Hungary	List	Márton Nagy	Independent	24 May 2022
Iceland	List	Daði Már Kristófersson	Viðreisn	21 December 2024
India	List	Nirmala Sitharaman	BJP	31 May 2019
Indonesia	List	Suahasil Nazara	Independent	14 September 2026
Iran	List	Rahmmattoollah Akrami	Independent	2 March 2025
Iraq	List	Taif Sami Mohammed	Independent	28 October 2022
Ireland	List	Simon Harris	Fine Gael	18 November 2025
Israel	List	Bezalel Smotrich	Religious Zionist	29 December 2022
Italy	List	Giancarlo Giorgetti	Lega Nord	22 October 2022
Ivory Coast	List	Adama Coulibaly	Independent	September 2019
Jamaica	List	Fayval Williams	JLP	30 October 2024
Japan	List	Satsuki Katayama	LDP	21 October 2025
Jordan	List	Mohamad Al Ississ	Independent	7 November 2019
Kazakhstan	List	Mädi Takiev	Amanat	6 February 2024
Kenya	List	John Mbadi	ODM	8 August 2024
Kiribati	List	Teuea Toatu (vice president)	TKP	15 March 2016
Kuwait	List	Nora Suleiman Al-Fassam	—N/a	25 August 2024
Kyrgyzstan	List	Almaz Baketaev	Independent	13 October 2021
Laos	List	Bounchom Oubonpaseuth	LPRP	22 March 2021
Latvia	List	Arvils Ašeradens	JV	14 December 2022
Lebanon	List	Yassine Jaber	Amal	8 February 2025
Lesotho	List	Retselisitsoe Matlanyane	RFP	4 November 2022
Liberia	List	Augustine Kpehe Ngafuan	Independent	16 September 2024
Libya	List	Khaled Al-Mabrouk Abdullah	Independent	15 March 2021
Liechtenstein		Brigitte Haas (prime minister)	VU	10 April 2025
Lithuania	List	Rimantas Šadžius	LSDP	12 December 2024
Luxembourg	List	Gilles Roth	CSV	17 November 2023
Madagascar	List	Rindra Rabarinirinarison	Independent	16 August 2021
Malawi	List	Simplex Chithyola Banda	MCP	8 October 2023
Malaysia	List	Anwar Ibrahim (prime minister)	PKR	3 December 2022
Malaysia	List	Amir Hamzah Azizan (second minister)	Independent	12 December 2023
Maldives	List	Moosa Zameer	PNC	30 September 2024
Mali	List	Alousséni Sanou	Independent	11 June 2021
Malta	List	Clyde Caruana	Labour	22 November 2020
Marshall Islands	List	David Paul	Independent	9 January 2024
Mauritania	List	Sid’Ahmed Ould Bouh	El Insaf	6 August 2024
Mauritius	List	Navin Ramgoolam (prime minister)	Labour	22 November 2024
Mexico	List	Edgar Amador Zamora	Independent	8 March 2025
Micronesia	List	Rose Nakanaga	—N/a	19 September 2023
Moldova	List	Victoria Belous	Independent	22 July 2026
Monaco	List	Pierre-André Chiappori	Independent	18 March 2024
Mongolia	List	Boldyn Javkhlan	MPP	29 January 2021
Montenegro	List	Novica Vuković	Independent	31 October 2023
Morocco	List	Nadia Fettah Alaoui	Independent	7 October 2021
Mozambique	List	Ernesto Max Elias Tonela	FRELIMO	4 March 2022
Myanmar	List	Win Shein	Independent	1 February 2021
Namibia	List	Ericah Shafudah	SWAPO	22 March 2025
Nauru	List	David Adeang (president)	Independent	30 October 2023
Nepal	List	Swarnim Wagle	RSP	27 March 2026
Netherlands	List	Eelco Heinen	VVD	2 July 2024
New Zealand	List	Nicola Willis	National	27 November 2023
Nicaragua		Iván Acosta	FSLN	15 February 2012
Niger	List	Ali Lamine Zeine (prime minister)	Independent	10 August 2023
Nigeria	List	Wale Edun	Independent	21 August 2023
North Korea	List	Ri Myong Guk	Workers' Party	1 July 2024
North Macedonia	List	Gordana Dimitrieska-Kočoska	Independent	25 June 2024
Norway	List	Jens Stoltenberg	Labour	4 February 2025
Oman	List	Sultan bin Salem al-Habsi	—N/a	18 August 2020
Pakistan	List	Muhammad Aurangzeb	PML(N)	11 March 2024
Palau	List	vacant	Independent	January 2025
Palestine	List	Estephan Salameh	Independent	31 March 2024
Panama		Felipe Chapman	RM	15 May 2024
Papua New Guinea	List	Thomas Opa	Pangu Pati	24 February 2026
Paraguay	List	Carlos Fernández Valdovinos	Independent	15 August 2023
Peru	List	Elmer Cuba	All for Peru	28 July 2026
Philippines	List	Frederick Go	Independent	17 November 2025
Poland	List	Andrzej Domański	PO	13 December 2023
Portugal	List	Joaquim Miranda Sarmento	PSD	2 April 2024
Qatar	List	Ali bin Ahmed Al Kuwari	—N/a	19 October 2021
Romania	List	Barna Tánczos	UDMR	23 December 2024
Russia	List	Anton Siluanov	United Russia	27 September 2011
Rwanda	List	Yusuf Murangwa	Independent	13 June 2024
Saint Kitts and Nevis	List	Terrance Drew (prime minister)	SKNLP	6 August 2022
Saint Lucia	List	Philip J. Pierre (prime minister)	Labour Party	28 July 2021
Saint Vincent and the Grenadines	List	Godwin Friday	New Democratic	2 December 2025
Samoa	List	Lautimuia Uelese Vaʻai	FAST	1 October 2023
San Marino	List	Marco Gatti	PDCS	7 January 2020
São Tomé and Príncipe	List	Genésio da Mata	Independent	2022
Saudi Arabia	List	Mohammed Al-Jadaan	—N/a	31 October 2016
Senegal	List	Cheikh Diba	PASTEF	6 May 2024
Serbia	List	Siniša Mali	SNS	29 May 2018
Seychelles	List	Pierre Laporte	US	6 November 2025
Sierra Leone	List	Sheku Ahmed Fantamadi Bangura	Independent	10 January 2023
Singapore	List	Lawrence Wong (prime minister)	PAP	15 May 2021
Singapore	List	Indranee Rajah (second minister)	PAP	1 May 2018
Singapore	List	Chee Hong Tat (second minister)	PAP	18 January 2024
Slovakia	List	Ladislav Kamenický	Smer	25 October 2023
Slovenia	List	Klemen Boštjančič	Svoboda	1 June 2022
Solomon Islands	List	Manasseh Sogavare	OUR Party	6 May 2024
Somalia	List	Bihi Egeh	Independent	9 July 2023
South Africa	List	Enoch Godongwana	ANC	5 August 2021
South Korea	List	Koo Yun-cheol	Independent	19 July 2025
South Sudan	List	Marial Dongrin	Independent	15 July 2024
Spain	List	Arcadi España	PSOE	27 March 2026
Sri Lanka	List	Anura Kumara Dissanayake (president)	NPP	24 September 2024
Sudan	List	Gibril Ibrahim	JEM	10 February 2021
Suriname	List	Armand Achaibersing	VHP	16 July 2020
Sweden	List	Elisabeth Svantesson	Moderate	18 October 2022
Switzerland	List	Karin Keller-Sutter (president)	FDP.The Liberals	1 January 2023
Syria	List	Mohammed Yisr Barnieh	Independent	29 March 2025
Tajikistan	List	Faiziddin Qahhorzoda	Independent	19 January 2018
Tanzania	List	Mwigulu Nchemba	CCM	31 March 2021
Thailand	List	Ekniti Nitithanprapas	Independent	19 September 2025
Togo	List	Sani Yaya	UNIR	1 August 2016
Tonga	List	ʻAisake Eke (prime minister)	Independent	28 January 2025
Trinidad and Tobago	List	Davendranath Tancoo	UNC	3 May 2025
Tunisia	List	Michkat Khaldi	Independent	5 February 2025
Turkey	List	Mehmet Şimşek	AK Party	4 June 2023
Turkmenistan	List	Mämmetguly Astanagulow	TDP	7 February 2025
Tuvalu	List	Panapasi Nelesoni	Independent	27 February 2024
Uganda	List	Matia Kasaija	NRM	1 March 2015
Ukraine	List	Serhiy Marchenko	Independent	30 March 2020
United Arab Emirates	List	Maktoum bin Mohammed Al Maktoum	—N/a	25 September 2021
United Kingdom	List	John Healey	Labour	20 July 2026
United States	List	Scott Bessent	Republican	28 January 2025
Uruguay	List	Gabriel Oddone	Broad Front	1 March 2025
Uzbekistan	List	Sherzod Kudbiyev	Independent	30 December 2022
Vanuatu	List	Johnny Koanapo	Vanua'aku Pati	5 September 2023
Venezuela	List	Simón Zerpa	PSUV	26 October 2017
Vietnam	List	Ngô Văn Tuấn	Communist Party	8 April 2026
Yemen	List	Salem bin Breik	Independent	18 September 2016
Yemen	List	Abdulrab Ahmed (disputed)	Independent	2024
Zambia	List	Situmbeko Musokotwane	UPND	27 August 2021
Zimbabwe	List	Mthuli Ncube	ZANU–PF	10 September 2018

== States with limited recognition, non-UN member states ==
State	List	Current finance minister	Political affiliation	Assumed office
Abkhazia		Amra Kvarandzia	Independent	17 October 2014
Kosovo	List	Hekuran Murati	LVV	22 March 2021
Northern Cyprus	List	Özdemir Berova	UBP	11 August 2023
Sahrawi Arab Democratic Republic		Mohamed Mouloud Mohamed Fadel	Polisario	14 February 2023
Somaliland	List	Abdilahi Hassan Aadam	Waddani	13 December 2024
South Ossetia				
Taiwan	List	Chuang Tsui-yun	Independent	31 January 2023
Transnistria		Tatyana Kirova	Independent	1 January 2018

== Other entities ==
Entity	List	Current finance minister	Political affiliation	Assumed office
European Union	List	Valdis Dombrovskis	EPP	1 December 2024
Sovereign Military Order of Malta		János Esterházy de Galántha	Independent	31 May 2014

== See also ==
- Lists of office-holders
