= Rigobert Roger Andely =

Congolese central banker and academic

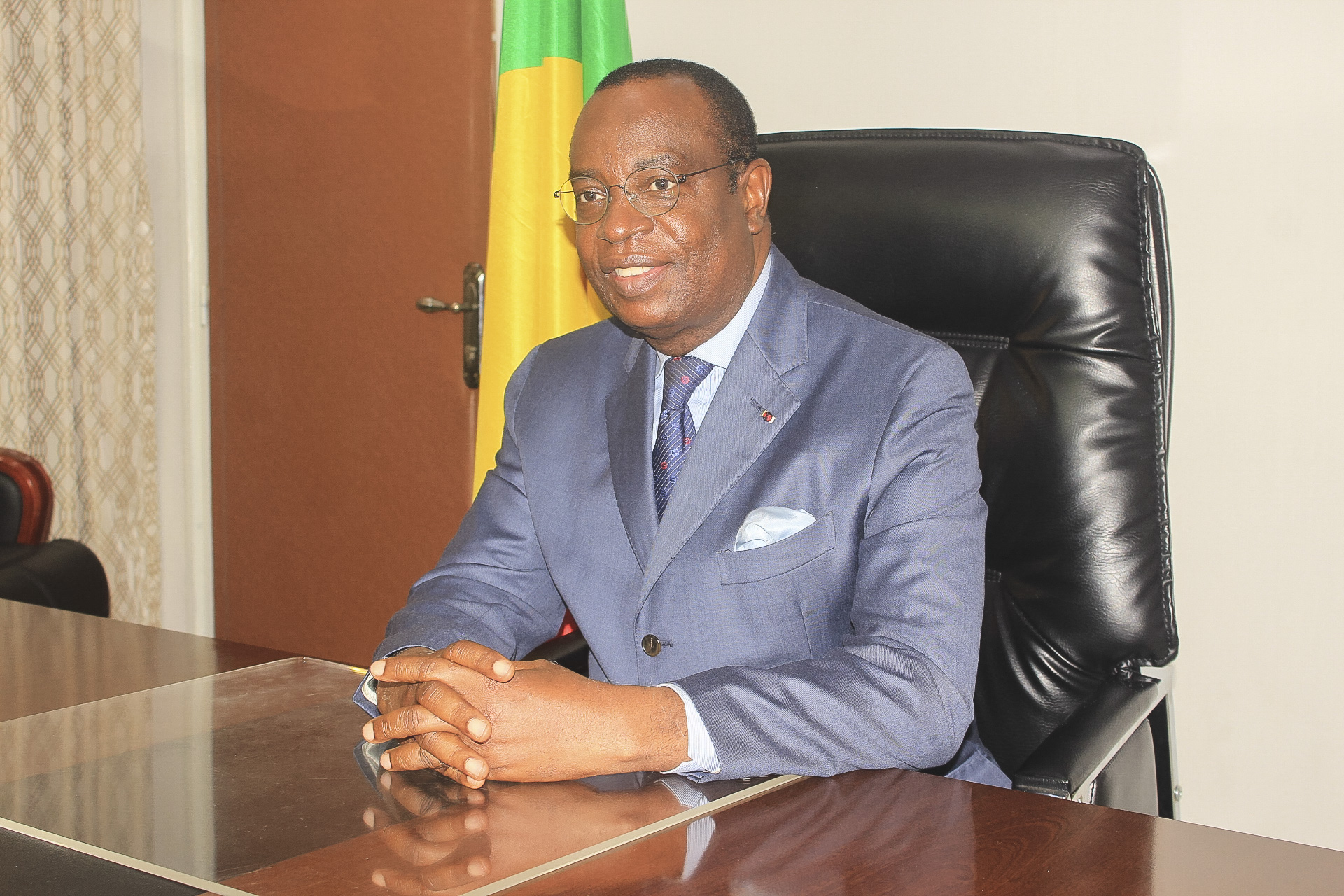

Minister of Finance of the Republic of Congo
- Incumbent
- Assumed office 12 May 2021
- President: Denis Sassou Nguesso
- Preceded by: Calixte Ganongo
- In office 18 August 2002 – 7 January 2005
- President: Denis Sassou Nguesso
- Preceded by: Mathias Dzon
- Succeeded by: Pacifique Issoïbeka

President of the Regulatory Authority for Public Procurement (ARMP)
- In office 1 July 2015 – 12 May 2021
- Preceded by: Gabriel Longombé

Chairman of the Board of Directors of the Sino-Congolese Bank for Africa (BSCA.Bank)
- In office 29 November 2011 – 12 May 2021
- President: Denis Sassou Nguesso

Vice-Governor of the Bank of Central African States (BEAC)
- In office February 2005 – January 2010
- Governor: Félix Mamalepot
- Preceded by: Pacifique Issoïbeka
- Succeeded by: Tahir Hamid Nguilin

Vice-Governor of the Bank of Central African States (BEAC)
- In office 17 March 1998 – 18 August 2002
- Governor: Félix Mamalepot
- Preceded by: Jean Edouard Sathoud
- Succeeded by: Pacifique Issoïbeka

Personal details
- Born: June 7, 1953 (age 72) Mossaka District, Cuvette Department, Republic of Congo

Rigobert Roger Andely (born June 7, 1953), is a Congolese central banker and academic specializing in monetary and banking economics. He was Vice-Governor of the Bank of Central African States (BEAC) from 1998 to 2002, Minister of Finance in the government of Congo-Brazzaville from 2002 to 2005, and Vice-Governor of the BEAC again from 2005 to 2010.

He is currently Chairman of the Board of Directors of the Sino-Congolese Bank for Africa (BSCA.Bank)) and the President of the Regulatory Authority for Public Procurement (ARMP) in Congo-Brazzaville.

== Education ==
Born in Mossaka, Andely attended primary school in Lébango and Etoumbi in Cuvette-Ouest, and attended middle school at the Collège de Boundji in Cuvette. Afterwards he went to the State Technical High School in Brazzaville, where he obtained a French baccalaureate in business management in 1973.

Admitted to the University of Brazzaville in 1973, Andely graduated valedictorian with a Master of Economics in 1977.

After graduating valedictorian with a post-graduate degree in monetary and financial economics from the Clermont-Ferrand University in France, Andely was recruited in Paris to join the Bank of Central African States (BEAC) and then admitted to the BEAC's Training Center for Managerial Personnel, from which he graduated at the top of the class in October 1979. Assigned to BEAC's headquarters in Yaoundé, Cameroon, he soon became the head of its Monetary Analysis and Statistics Department. In 1982, he obtained his doctorate in monetary and financial economics.

== Career ==
=== International Monetary Fund ===
In July 1987, Andely was seconded to the International Monetary Fund in Washington, DC, where he served as Desk Economist for Benin and Acting Economist for the Ivory Coast and Togo. During this period, he worked on his PhD thesis in economics, entitled “Neoliberal Monetary and Financial Strategy for Development: Application to Sub-Saharan Africa”. In 1988, he successfully defended his thesis at the Clermont-Ferrand University and received first class honors.

=== Return to the BEAC ===
Upon his return to the BEAC headquarters in 1990, Andely was appointed Deputy Director of Research and Forecasting. During his tenure as Deputy Director, he initiated four major monetary reforms that continue to guide the BEAC’s current operations. These include:

- monetary programming, which allowed Central Banks to register their actions in an estimated macroeconomic framework;
- a renewed monetary policy based on the use of indirect policy instruments;
- the use of money market instruments instead of direct advances to banks, and;
- introducing the first studies of the financial market in Central Africa (the Central Africa Stock Exchange).

=== Minister of the Economy, Finance, and Budget ===
In 1998 Andely continued his rise at the BEAC when, at the age of 45, he was appointed Vice-Governor of the Central Bank, a position which he held until August 2002, when he was appointed Minister of the Economy, Finance, and Budget of the Republic of Congo. As Minister of Finance, Andely led negotiations with the Paris and London clubs that helped significantly reduce Congo-Brazzaville’s debt at a time when the country was considered the most indebted country per capita. During his tenure at the Ministry of Finance, Andely also led the repayment of large domestic debt, ensured the payment of salary arrears to civil servants, completed the process for financing the Imboulou hydroelectric dam, and instituted reforms to promote transparency and good governance in order to spur Congo’s economic growth.

=== Return to the BEAC ===
After three years as Minister of Finance of Congo-Brazzaville, Andely returned to his role as Vice-Governor of the Bank of Central African States in February 2005. However, following a decision by the Heads of State of the Economic and Monetary Community of Central African States (CEMAC) in 2010 Andely left this position due to problems related to unsound BEAC investment funds managed by the Société Générale, although he had no direct involvement in decisions related to the investment funds.

Upon leaving the BEAC, Andely was appointed in 2011 by Congolese President Denis Sassou Nguesso as Head of the Regulatory Authority for Public Procurement and in 2012, he joined the International Monetary Fund’s Advisory Group for Sub-Saharan Africa as an Advisor.

In 2014, Andely chaired the Task Force in charge of creating the Sino-Congolese Bank for Africa, which became fully operational on July 1, 2015 with headquarters in Brazzaville. He is currently Chairman of the Board of Directors of the Sino-Congolese Bank for Africa (BSCA.Bank).

== Honors and awards ==
Andely has received several honors and awards for his work on Africa, including Orders of Merit from three countries, Ivory Coast, Gabon and Equatorial Guinea, as well as the Congolese Grand Officier de l’Ordre du Mérite.

== Academic service and work ==
Andely is a regular speaker at the Center for the Study and Research on International Development (CERDI) at the Clermont-Ferrand University in France. He has also published several articles in French and English, on economics, monetary policy, and banking, notably in the BEAC’s “Research and Statistics Bulletin.” He is also a member of the strategy committee of the Foundation for the Study and Research of International Development (FERDI)

He is bi-lingual in English and French.

== Personal life ==
Andely is married and the father of 10 children. He has a passion for nature and likes to tend to his safou fields located 45 kilometers away from Brazzaville. He is an avid reader of history books. He is also passionate about Congolese music and American country music.
