= Pacifique Issoïbeka =

Congolese political figure (born 1941)

Pacifique Issoïbeka (born 1941?) is a Congolese political figure who served in the government of Congo-Brazzaville as Minister of Finance from 2005 to 2009. He previously worked at the Bank of Central African States (BEAC) and was its Vice-Governor from 2003 to 2005.

== Life and career ==
Issoïbeka was born in Mossaka, located in northern Congo-Brazzaville. He was Deputy Director of BEAC in Congo before becoming the National Director of BEAC in Congo in 1998. He was appointed as Vice-Governor of BEAC on 23 January 2003, taking office on 13 November 2003. He held that post until he was appointed to the Congolese government as Minister of Finance, the Economy, and the Budget on 7 January 2005 in replacement to Rigobert Roger Andely.

In June 2009, Issoïbeka signed a deal with Switzerland's ambassador that would cancel five billion CFA francs of Congolese debt.

President Denis Sassou Nguesso appointed Gilbert Ondongo to replace Issoïbeka as Minister of Finance on 15 September 2009.
