= 2021 Republic of the Congo presidential election =

- 21 March 2021
- Registered: 2,645,283
- Turnout: 67.17% (▼1.75pp)
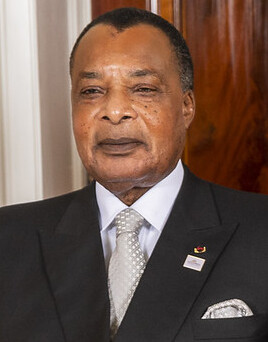

Nominee	Denis Sassou Nguesso	Guy Brice Parfait Kolélas
Party	PCT	UDH-YUKI
Popular vote	1,539,725	138,561
Percentage	88.40%	7.96%
President before election
Denis Sassou Nguesso
PCT
Elected President
Denis Sassou Nguesso
PCT

Presidential elections were held in the Republic of the Congo on 21 March 2021. Incumbent president Denis Sassou Nguesso was re-elected with 88% of the vote. His main opponent, Guy Brice Parfait Kolélas, died hours after polls closed.

== Electoral system ==
The President of the Republic of the Congo is elected for a five-year term, with the possibility of a maximum of two re-elections. In the election, only the candidate who obtains an absolute majority of valid votes is elected. If no candidate reaches that majority, the two candidates with the highest votes face a second round twenty-one days after the results are announced by the Constitutional Court.

== Conduct ==
Telecommunications were cut off during election day at a national level, mirroring events from the 2016 elections, a situation that was condemned by international organizations such as the African Union.

== Results ==
Guy Brice Parfait Kolélas, the opposition presidential candidate, died from COVID-19 on a plane en route to France for treatment, on the afternoon of the election. Sassou Ngessou was reelected with 88.4% of the vote.

Candidate	Party	Votes	%
Denis Sassou-Nguesso	Congolese Party of Labour	1,539,725	88.40
Guy Brice Parfait Kolélas	Union of Humanist Democrats-Yuki	138,561	7.96
Mathias Dzon	Patriotic Union for National Renewal	33,497	1.92
Joseph Kignoumbi Kia Mboungou	La Chaine	10,718	0.62
Dave Mafoula	Sovereigntists	9,143	0.52
Albert Oniangué	Independent	6,977	0.40
Anguios Nganguia Engambé	Party for Action of the Republic	3,157	0.18
Total		1,741,778	100.00
Valid votes		1,741,778	98.03
Invalid/blank votes		35,008	1.97
Total votes		1,776,786	100.00
Registered voters/turnout		2,645,283	67.17
Source: Constitutional Court
