= Dzon =

Dzon or Džon (Cyrillic: "Џон") is an alternate form for the name John.

People by that name

- Dzon Delarge, Congolese football player
- Mathias Dzon, Congolese politician
- Johnny Miljus (Džon Kenet Miljuš), Serbian-American baseball player
- John Lukic (Jovan "Džon" Lukić), English football player
- Timothy John Byford (Тимоти Џон Бајфорд), Serbian-English artist

== See also ==
- Kenyon Jones (basketball) (Kenajn Dzons), American basketball player
