= Lamyr Nguélé =

Congolese politician

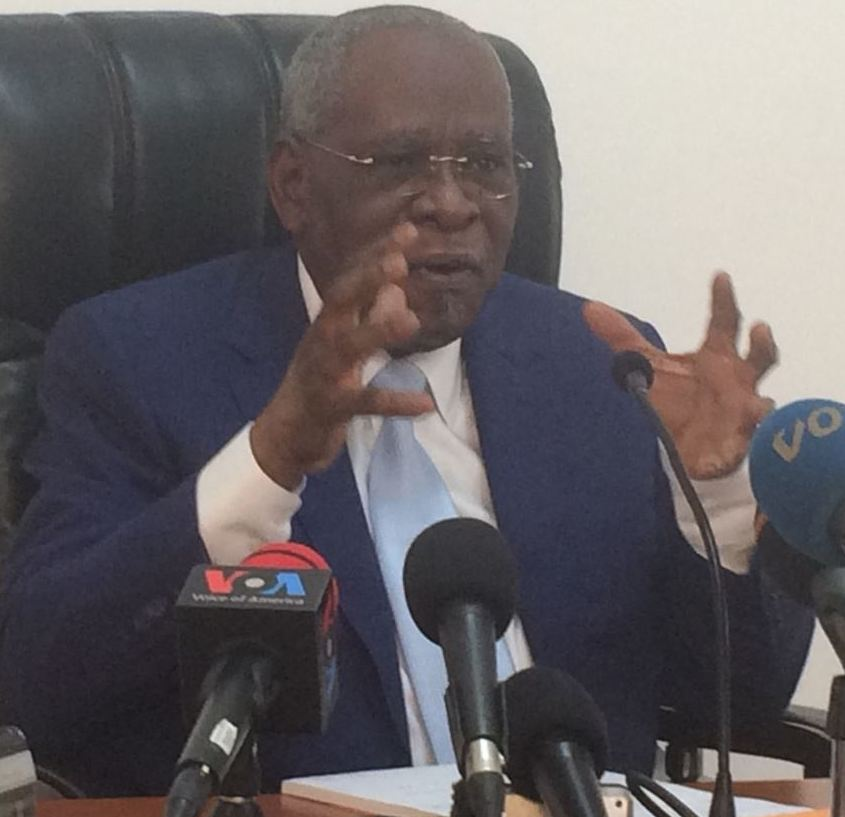
Lamyr Nguélé, President of the National Commission for the Fight Against Corruption (Republic of the Congo), commenting an investigation against the Minister of Hydrocarbons on July 31, 2018

Lamyr Nguélé is a Congolese politician. He served in the government of Congo-Brazzaville as Minister-Delegate in charge of Land Reform from 2002 to 2005 and then as Minister of Land Reform from 2005 to 2009. Subsequently he was a Deputy in the National Assembly from 2009 to 2012. He has been President of the National Commission for the Fight Against Corruption since 2013.

== Political career ==
Nguélé is a native of Mossendjo and an ethnic Batsangui. During the 1990s, he was a magistrate sitting on the Brazzaville Court of Appeal and was elected to the Supreme Magistracy Council.

When Denis Sassou Nguesso returned to power at the end of the June–October 1997 civil war, he appointed Nguélé to the government as Minister-Delegate for Urban Planning, Construction, and Housing, in which position Nguélé worked under the Minister of State for Reconstruction and Urban Development, Justin Lekoundzou. Subsequently he was appointed as Minister-Delegate for Land Reform at the Ministry of Construction, Town Planning, Housing, and Land Reform on 18 August 2002. The Convergence for Congo, a political association led by Nguélé, was founded in 2003. Nguélé was promoted to the post of Minister of Land Reform and the Preservation of the Public Domain on 7 January 2005.

Nguélé and his political association, the Convergence for Congo, have concentrated on working to improve and modernize life in Mossendjo. After Mossendjo suffered structural damage due to strong winds on 23 January 2006, Nguélé held a fundraiser in Brazzaville to collect money to repair the damage. Tele Mossendjo, a television station for Mossendjo, was created at Nguélé's initiative and launched on 29 April 2007. Nguélé said on that occasion that the station would end the town's isolation by providing its people with direct access to information concerning events in the rest of the country and the world, particularly emphasizing that it would enable the people to follow the work of the government and President Sassou Nguesso. On the same date, he inaugurated a local bridge across the Itsibou River; the completion of the bridge, which was needed to facilitate local trade, fulfilled a pledge made by Nguélé some years before.

In the June 2007 parliamentary election, Nguélé ran as an independent candidate in Mossendjo constituency, although he was a member of the ruling Congolese Labour Party (PCT). The first round of the election in Mossendjo was held over again in July 2007 due to local difficulties. Nguélé placed second with 23.30% of the vote, behind Emmanuel Boungouandza, the candidate of the opposition Pan-African Union for Social Democracy (UPADS), who received 34.94%. Because neither of them obtained a first round majority, Nguélé faced Boungouandza in a second round of voting in August 2007. After the second round, both sides claimed victory as they awaited the publication of results, and police were deployed to deal with the local tensions. Boungouandza claimed to have won by 94 votes, but alleged that some members of the local commission were working separately from the rest in an effort "to tilt the results in favor of my opponent", and he said that Mossendjo was under a "state of siege". Nguélé was subsequently declared the victor, credited with a narrow second round majority of 51.91%, but Boungouandza took the matter to the Constitutional Court, arguing that the results should be cancelled; he claimed that the results from three of the 25 polling stations were not included in the total. The Constitutional Court upheld Nguélé's victory on 26 October 2007, ruling that Boungouandza did not have enough evidence to warrant the cancellation of the results.

On 28–29 August 2008, Nguélé was present for an operation to demolish homes along a three-mile stretch of the coast at Matombi and evict squatters from the area. The purpose of the demolition project was to clear space for construction of a port for the export of minerals. Nguélé emphasized that the operation had been explained to residents in advance and denied claims that it was "an act of state banditry". He said that legal residents of the area would be compensated.

After nearly five years as Minister of Land Reform and the Preservation of the Public Domain, Nguélé was dismissed from the government on 15 September 2009. He then returned to his seat in the National Assembly.

In the July–August 2012 parliamentary election, Nguélé sought re-election to the National Assembly as the PCT candidate in Mossendjo, but he was soundly defeated in the second round of voting. He received 29.62% of the vote against 70.37% for his opponent, the independent candidate Joseph Tsalabiendzé.

Sassou Nguesso appointed Nguélé as President of the National Commission for the Fight Against Corruption, Embezzlement, and Fraud on 1 March 2013.
