= Vice President of the Republic of the Congo =

Vice President of the Republic of the Congo (French: Vice-Président du Congo) was a political position in Congo Brazzaville from 1960 to 1979.

Vice Presidents were appointed by the president.

== Republic of the Congo ==
| Position | Name | Took office | Left office | President | Ref |
|---|---|---|---|---|---|
| First Vice President | Stéphane Tchichelle | 1960 | 1963 | Fulbert Youlou | |
| Second Vice President | Jacques Opangault | June 1961 | April 1962 | Fulbert Youlou | |
| Vice President of the Council of National Revolution | Ange Diawara | September 1968 | January 1969 | Alfred Raoul | |
| First Vice President | Ange Diawara | January 1969 | March 1969 | Marien Ngouabi | |
| Second Vice President | Aimé Gilles Portella | January 1969 | May 1969 | Marien Ngouabi | |

== People's Republic of the Congo ==
| Position | Name | Took office | Left office | President | Ref |
|---|---|---|---|---|---|
| Vice President | Alfred Raoul | Jan 1970 | December 1971 | Marien Ngouabi | |
| Vice President | Aloïse Moudileno-Massengo | December 1971 | August 1972 | Marien Ngouabi | |
| Vice President | Ange Édouard Poungui | August 1972 | 30 August 1973 | Marien Ngouabi | |
| First Vice President | Denis Sassou Nguesso | March 1977 | February 1979 | Joachim Yhombi-Opango | |
| Second Vice President | Louis Sylvain Goma | March 1977 | February 1979 | Joachim Yhombi-Opango | |
