= Joseph Tsalabiendzé =

Congolese politician

Joseph Tsalabiendzé is a Congolese politician who has served in the National Assembly of Congo-Brazzaville since 2012.

== Life and career ==
In the July–August 2012 parliamentary election, Tsalabiendzé stood as an independent candidate in Mossendjo, a constituency in Niari Department. In the first round of voting, he placed first with 22.12% of the vote, ahead of the incumbent deputy, Lamyr Nguélé, who was standing as the candidate of the Congolese Labour Party (PCT) and received 21.89%. He easily defeated Nguélé in the second round of voting, receiving 70.37% of the vote.

After the Minister of Finance, Gilbert Ondongo, presented the proposed 2014 budget to the National Assembly, Tsalabiendzé and two other independent deputies, Anicet Gomas and José Cyr Ebina, held a press conference on 12 November 2013 to express disappointment in the government's failure to begin work on the projects planned for their constituencies in the 2013 budget. They complained that they had gone to their constituents touting these projects and did not know how they could explain the lack of progress to their constituents.
