= Gilbert Ondongo =

Congolese politician

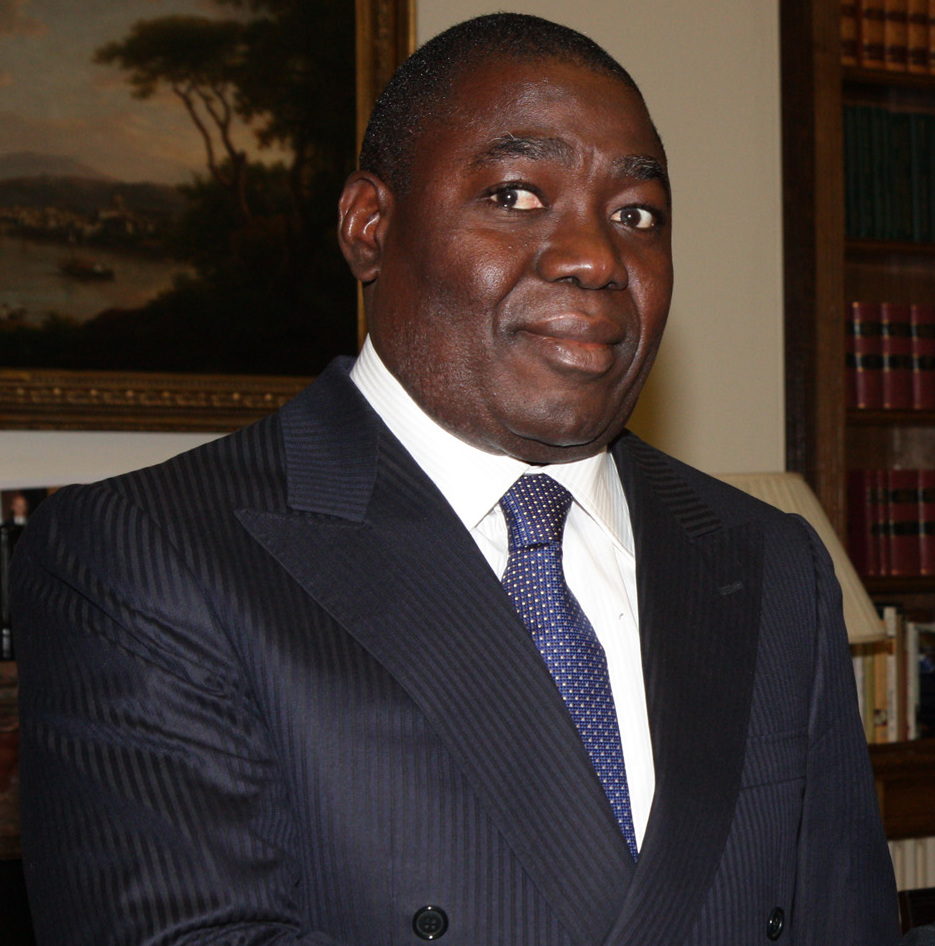
Gilbert Ondongo in December 2011

Gilbert Ondongo (born 1960) is a Congolese politician who has served in the government of Congo-Brazzaville as Minister of State for the Economy, Industry and Public Finances since 2017. Previously he was Minister of Labour from 2005 to 2009, and Minister of Finance from 2009 to 2016.

== Political career ==
Born at Owando, Ondongo belongs to the Kouyou ethnic group. He began working at the Marien Ngouabi University in Brazzaville in the 1980s. After Denis Sassou Nguesso returned to power in the June–October 1997 civil war, he appointed Ondongo as Adviser to the President on the Economy, Finance, and the Budget; Ondongo served in that post from 1997 to 2002. He was then appointed to the government on 18 August 2002 as Secretary of State for Budgetary Reform and Financial Administration, working under the Minister of the Economy, Finance, and the Budget. He was promoted to the position of Minister of Labour, Employment, and Social Security on 7 January 2005.

Ondongo was Congo's candidate for the Presidency of the 96th Session of the International Labour Conference, but Congo withdrew his candidacy on 1 June 2007, allowing the unopposed election of Albania's Kastriot Sulka.

During the campaign for the July 2009 presidential election, Ondongo worked on President Sassou Nguesso's re-election campaign, heading the campaign's finance and budgetary control department. After Sassou Nguesso won re-election, he moved Ondongo to the post of Minister of Finance on 15 September 2009.

On 28 January 2010, Ondongo announced that Congo-Brazzaville had reached its "completion point" in the Heavily Indebted Poor Countries program, a debt relief initiative, thereby qualifying for a large reduction in the size of its external debt.

At the PCT's Sixth Extraordinary Congress, held in July 2011, Ondongo was elected to the PCT's 51-member Political Bureau. In the July–August 2012 parliamentary election, Ondongo stood as the PCT candidate in the first constituency of Owando. He won the seat in the first round with 75.19% of the vote. In the government appointed after the election, on 25 September 2012, Ondongo retained the finance portfolio and was additionally assigned responsibility for planning; he was also promoted to the rank of Minister of State.

In October 2013, Ondongo presented the draft of the national budget for 2014 to the National Assembly; the budget was increased slightly, from 4.12 billion CFA francs in 2013 to 4.13 billion for 2014.

After Sassou Nguesso's victory in the March 2016 presidential election, Ondongo was appointed as Minister of State for the Economy, Industrial Development and Promotion of the Private Sector on 30 April 2016; Calixte Ganongo replaced him as Minister of Finance. Ondongo took office at his new ministry on 4 May 2016, succeeding Isidore Mvouba. In the July 2017 parliamentary election, Ondongo stood unopposed as a candidate in the second constituency of Owando, with no other candidates standing in the constituency.
