= Poaty =

Poaty is a surname. Notable people with the surname include:

- Alphonse Poaty-Souchlaty (1941–2024), Congolese politician, 8th prime minister of the Republic of the Congo
- Morgan Poaty (born 1997), French–Congolese footballer
