= Safarali Nadzhmiddinov =

Tajik politician (1951–2025)

Nadzhmiddinov in 2014

Safarali Nadzhmiddinov (Tajik: Сафаралӣ Наҷмиддинов; 20 November 1951 – 16 July 2025) was a Tajik politician, who served as the minister of finance from 2000 to 2013.

== Life and career ==
Nadzhmiddinov was born on 20 November 1951 in the Vose district, Khatlon. In 1973, he graduated from the Faculty of Economics of the Tajik State University. From 1973 to 1993, he worked as a senior accountant-auditor of the Central Statistical Department of the Republic of Tajikistan, then held the positions of deputy head and head of the control and accounting financial department of the Accounting Department, head of the Control and Accounting Department of the Trade Department of the Dushanbe City Executive Committee. The last position during this period was the position of the head of the Department of Accounting and Audit of the Ministry of Trade of the Republic of Tajikistan.

From 1993 to 2000, he served as Deputy Minister of Trade and Deputy Chairman of the State Committee for Contracts and Trade.

From 2000 to 29 November 2013, he was Minister of Finance of the Republic of Tajikistan. After his resignation, he was appointed director of the Agency for Social Insurance and Pensions under the Government of Tajikistan. As of May 14, 2019, he was retired.

Nadzhmiddinov died in Dushanbe on 16 July 2025, at the age of 73.
