= Louis Sylvain Goma =

Congolese politician (born 1941)

Louis Sylvain-Goma
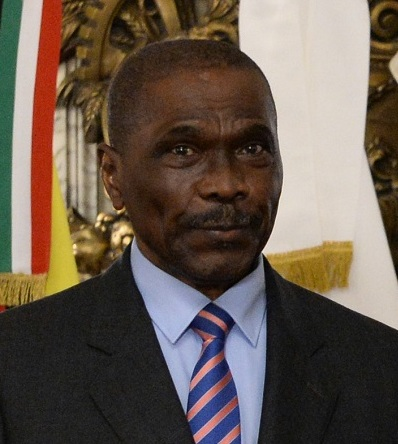
- Goma in 2019

Ambassador of the Republic of the Congo to Brazil
- Incumbent
- Assumed office 21 April 2012
- President: Denis Sassou-Nguesso

Secretary-General of the Economic Community of Central African States
- In office 1999–2012

Prime Minister of the People's Republic of the Congo
- In office 8 January 1991 – 8 June 1991
- President: Denis Sassou-Nguesso
- Preceded by: Pierre Moussa
- Succeeded by: André Milongo
- In office 18 December 1975 – 7 August 1984
- President: Marien Ngouabi; Joachim Yhombi-Opango; Denis Sassou-Nguesso
- Preceded by: Henri Lopes
- Succeeded by: Ange Édouard Poungui

Personal details
- Born: June 24, 1941 (age 85) Pointe-Noire, French Equatorial Africa
- Party: Congolese Party of Labour
- Education: École spéciale militaire de Saint-Cyr
- Profession: General, Diplomat

Louis Sylvain Goma (born 24 June 1941) is a Congolese politician who was Prime Minister of Congo-Brazzaville from 18 December 1975 to 7 August 1984, serving under three successive Heads of State: Marien Ngouabi, Jacques Yhombi-Opango, and Denis Sassou Nguesso. Later, he was Secretary-General of the Economic Community of Central African States from 1999 to 2012. Since 21 April 2012, Goma has served as ambassador of the Republic of the Congo to Brazil on 21 April 2012.

== Career ==
Prime Minister Henri Lopès and his government resigned after a meeting of the Congolese Labour Party's Central Committee in December 1975, and Goma was appointed to replace him at the head of a new government, composed of 14 members, on 18 December 1975. Goma and Denis Sassou Nguesso were the two deputies of Joachim Yhombi-Opango from March 1977 to February 1979.

After the June–October 1997 civil war, Goma was included as one of the 75 members of the National Transitional Council (CNT), which served as a transitional legislature from 1998 to 2002.

Considered close to President Denis Sassou Nguesso, Goma was Secretary-General of the Economic Community of Central African States (CEEAC) from 1999 to 2012. Soon after being replaced in his post at CEEAC in early 2012, Goma was appointed as Congo-Brazzaville's Ambassador to Brazil on 21 April 2012. He presented his credentials as Ambassador to Brazilian President Dilma Rousseff in January 2013. As the resident Ambassador to Brazil, he is also concurrently accredited to Argentina, Bolivia, Paraguay, Chile, Uruguay, Peru, Venezuela, Colombia, Suriname, Ecuador, and Guyana.

Political offices
Preceded by Henri Lopès	Prime Minister of Congo-Brazzaville; 1975–1984	Succeeded by Ange Édouard Poungui
Preceded by Pierre Moussa	Prime Minister of Congo-Brazzaville; 1991	Succeeded by André Milongo
