= Pierre Moussa =

Congolese politician (born 1941)

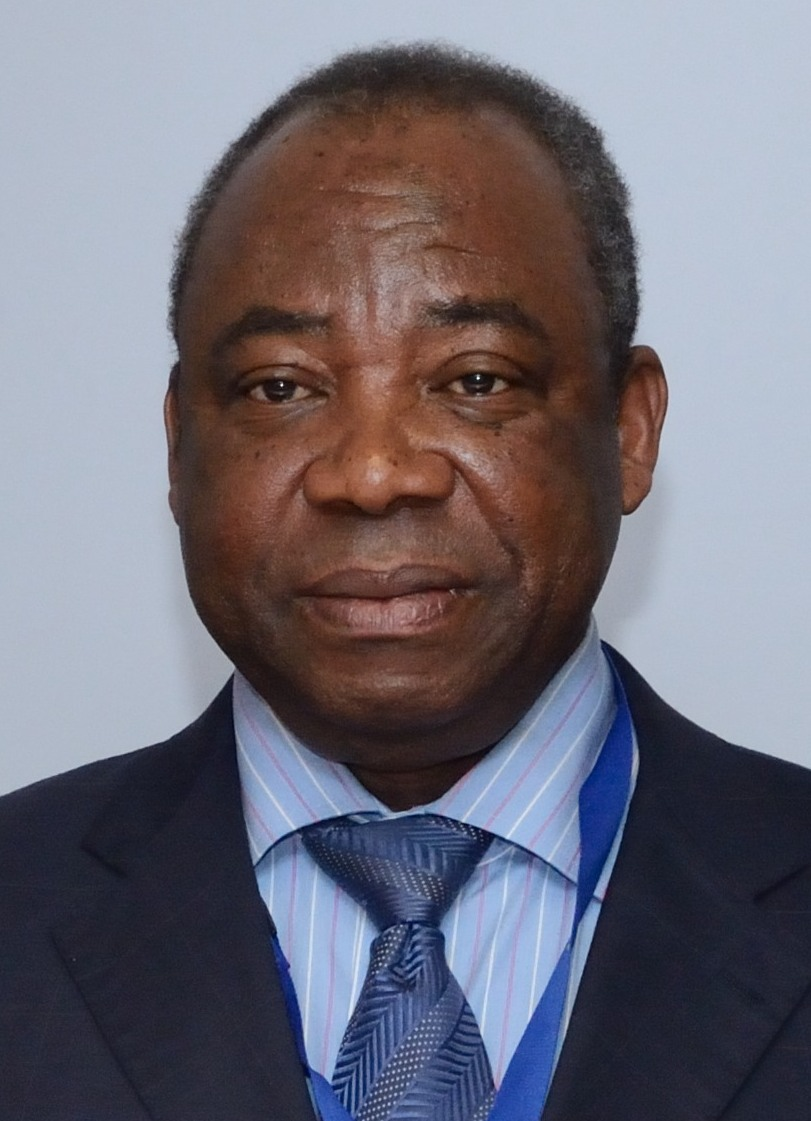
- Moussa in 2014

Secretary-General of the Congolese Party of Labour
- Incumbent
- Assumed office 30 December 2019
- President: Denis Sassou-Nguesso
- Preceded by: Pierre Ngolo

President of the Commission of the CEMAC
- In office 28 August 2012 – February 2017
- Preceded by: Antoine Ntsimi
- Succeeded by: Daniel Ona Ondo

Prime Minister of the People's Republic of the Congo
- Acting
- In office 3 December 1990 – 8 January 1991
- President: Denis Sassou-Nguesso
- Preceded by: Alphonse Poaty-Souchlaty
- Succeeded by: Louis Sylvain Goma

Personal details
- Born: 24 July 1941 (age 85) Owando, Congo-Brazzaville
- Party: Congolese Party of Labour

Pierre Moussa (born 24 July 1941) is a Congolese politician and economist who has served as Secretary-General of the Congolese Party of Labour since 2019. He previously served as President of the Commission of the Economic and Monetary Community of Central Africa from 2012 to 2017.

Moussa also served in the government of Congo-Brazzaville as Minister of Planning from 1979 to 1991; later, he was Minister of Spatial Planning from 1997 to 2002, Minister of Planning from 2002 to 2009, and Minister of State for the Economy and Planning from 2009 to 2012.

== Political career ==
Moussa was born in Owando, located in northern Congo-Brazzaville. He was appointed as Secretary-General of Planning in 1978. Under President Denis Sassou Nguesso, Moussa was promoted to the government as Minister of Planning in 1979, and in the same year he joined the Central Committee of the Congolese Labour Party (PCT). On the PCT Central Committee, he was designated as Secretary for Planning and the Economy in 1984, and on 21 August 1987 his ministerial portfolio was modified when he was appointed as Minister of Planning and Finance. Considered "the regime's economist", Moussa joined the PCT Political Bureau in 1989 and was assigned responsibility for planning and the economy; he was also promoted to the rank of Minister of State for Planning and the Economy in the government named on 13 August 1989. He remained Minister of State for Planning and the Economy until 1991.

After Sassou Nguesso returned to power in the June–October 1997 civil war, he appointed Moussa to the government as Minister of Spatial Planning and Regional Development on 2 November 1997. In the May–June 2002 parliamentary election, he was elected to the National Assembly as the PCT candidate in the first constituency of Owando; he won the seat in the first round with 54.53% of the vote. Following the election, his portfolio was modified and he was named Minister of Planning, Spatial Planning, and Economic Integration on 18 August 2002. He was later promoted to the rank of Minister of State for Planning, Spatial Planning, Economic Integration, and NEPAD on 7 January 2005.

In the June–August 2007 parliamentary election, Moussa was again elected to the National Assembly as the PCT candidate in Owando's first constituency; he won the seat in the first round with 99.94% of the vote. Following the election, he was retained as Minister of State for Planning and Spatial Planning in the government named on 30 December 2007. After Sassou Nguesso won another term in the July 2009 presidential election, he re-organized the government, designating four ministers as coordinators of broad areas of government policy on 15 September 2009; Moussa, as one of the four, was assigned to coordinate economic matters in the government, and he was on the same occasion appointed as Minister of State for the Economy, Planning, Spatial Planning, and Integration.

At the PCT's Sixth Extraordinary Congress, held in July 2011, Moussa was elected to the PCT's 51-member Political Bureau. A year later, Moussa was designated as President of the Commission of the Economic and Monetary Community of Central Africa (CEMAC), with a five-year term, at the 11th Summit of CEMAC Heads of State, held in July 2012 at Brazzaville. He was sworn in as President of the CEMAC Commission on 28 August 2012. At a meeting of CEMAC leaders in February 2017, it was decided that Moussa would be replaced by Daniel Ona Ondo of Gabon.

Political offices
Preceded by Alphonse Poaty-Souchlaty	Prime Minister of Congo-Brazzaville (acting); 1990–1991	Succeeded by Louis Sylvain Goma
