= Ange Édouard Poungui =

Congolese politician (1942–2026)

Prime Minister of the People's Republic of the Congo
- In office 7 August 1984 – 7 August 1989
- President: Denis Sassou-Nguesso
- Preceded by: Louis Sylvain Goma
- Succeeded by: Alphonse Poaty-Souchlaty

Vice President of the People's Republic of the Congo
- In office August 1972 – 30 August 1973
- President: Marien Ngouabi
- Preceded by: Aloïse Moudileno-Massengo
- Succeeded by: Denis Sassou Nguesso

Personal details
- Born: 4 January 1942 Mouyondzi, French Congo
- Died: 28 April 2026 (aged 84)
- Party: Congolese Party of Labour (until 1990); Union for Social Progress and Democracy; Pan-African Union for Social Democracy (since 2006)

Ange Édouard Poungui (4 January 1942 – 28 April 2026) was a Congolese politician. He was the Prime Minister of Congo-Brazzaville from 7 August 1984 to 7 August 1989 under President Denis Sassou Nguesso. Poungui was chosen as the candidate of the Pan-African Union for Social Democracy (UPADS) for the 2009 presidential election, but was barred from running.

== Life and career ==
Ange Édouard Poungui was born on 4 January 1942.

In December 1969, Poungui was included in the original Political Bureau of the Congolese Labour Party (PCT) as President of the Economy, Finance, and Social Affairs Committee. He was also included in the smaller, five-member Political Bureau elected in December 1971 and was assigned responsibility for finance and equipment. He served as vice president of Marien Ngouabi from August 1972 to July 1973. He also served in the government as Minister of Finance until 30 August 1973.

Following the Third Ordinary Congress of the PCT, held on 27–31 July 1984, Poungui was appointed to succeed Louis Sylvain Goma as Prime Minister on 7 August 1984.

Amidst the introduction of multiparty politics, Poungui resigned from the PCT on 28 November 1990 and became the leader of a new party, the Union for Social Progress and Democracy (UPSD). At the end of the June–October 1997 civil war, in which PCT leader Denis Sassou Nguesso returned to power, Poungui, as a supporter of President Pascal Lissouba, fled into exile. He remained in exile until 2006.

Poungui joined UPADS and was elected as one of its 25 Vice-Presidents in December 2006, at the party's first extraordinary congress. He was later chosen as the party's candidate for the 2009 presidential election by the UPADS National Council in a primary election on 30 November 2008. His sole rival for the nomination, Joseph Kignoumbi Kia Mboungou, withdrew from the vote, complaining of "lack of transparency in the process", and Poungui, as the only candidate, received 85% of the vote.

On 19 June 2009, less than a month before the election, the Constitutional Court ruled against Poungui's candidacy, deciding that he was ineligible to stand because he had not lived continuously in the country for at least two years. UPADS denounced the ruling as politically motivated. As the representative of the main opposition party, Poungui was the most important opposition candidate, and his disqualification was viewed as eliminating any possibility that Sassou Nguesso might face a serious challenge in the election.

Following the announcement of official results showing an overwhelming victory for Sassou Nguesso, he and other opposition leaders participated in a banned protest march on 15 July 2009. After Sassou Nguesso was sworn in for a new term, Poungui said on 17 August 2009 that he had tried to travel to France "for purely personal and private reasons" on 14 August but had been barred from leaving the country by police who said that "all political figures should stay at home to attend national independence festivities" on 15 August. Poungui said that he tried again on 16 August but was still barred from leaving, and he claimed that he was therefore "under house arrest".

Government Spokesman Alain Akouala Atipault said on 24 August 2009 that it was necessary for Poungui to remain in Congo-Brazzaville while an investigation was conducted into the banned march, but he also said that Poungui was not under house arrest. In further remarks on 2 September, Akouala Atipault said that the banned march had been a disturbance of public order, and he stressed the principle of equality under the law, arguing that no one, not even prominent politicians, could behave with impunity. He acknowledged that Poungui was a free citizen who had not been convicted of a crime, but he nevertheless insisted that, under the circumstances, Poungui could not be allowed to leave.

According to Poungui, the government restricted his movements even within Congo-Brazzaville; he said that he and UPADS Secretary-General Pascal Tsaty Mabiala were barred from flying to the Congolese town of Dolisie to participate in a UPADS meeting in September 2009.

In a communiqué on 13 April 2010, a faction called the UPADS–Red Base identified Poungui as one of its leaders. Poungui denied the claim on 15 April, saying that he knew nothing of the "red" faction and that he remained a loyal member of the main UPADS faction, led by Tsaty Mabiala. On 29–30 June 2010, the UPADS National Council met and assigned Poungui to lead a six-member contact group that was tasked with persuading dissident party members to rejoin the main faction for the sake of party unity.

In the October 2011 Senate election, Poungui was elected to the Senate as a UPADS candidate in Bouenza Department.

Standing as a UPADS candidate, Poungui was elected as a local councillor in Madingou in the September 2014 local elections. In the Senate election held on 31 August 2017, he was re-elected to the Senate as a UPADS candidate in Bouenza.

Poungui died on 28 April 2026, at the age of 84.

Political offices
Preceded by Louis Sylvain Goma	Prime Minister of Congo-Brazzaville; 1984–1989	Succeeded by Alphonse Poaty-Souchlaty
