= Abdusalom Kurbonov =

Tajikistani politician

Abdusalom Kurbonov was a Tajik politician and former cabinet minister.

Kurbonov was born on 9 February 1959 in Khatlon Region. He had degrees in civil engineering and economics. From 1982 to 1984 he served in the Soviet Army. He then worked as engineer and then in leadership positions in production and economic issues in Khatlon region and Dushanbe.

Kurbonov was appointed Minister of Finance of Tajikistan from 29 November 2013 to 19 January 2018.
