= Stéphane Tchichelle =

Politician of the Republic of Congo

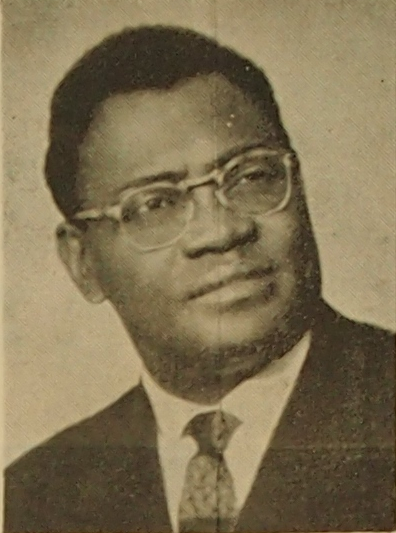
Robert Stéphane Tchitchelle, No. 2 of the first Congolese government of Fulbert Youlou, First Vice-President of the Council of Ministers, Minister of Foreign Affairs, Mayor of Pointe-Noire

Stéphane Tchichelle was a politician from Congo Republic who served as First Vice President of Republic of the Congo and Minister of Foreign Affarirs.

== Personal life ==
He was born on 12 January 1915 in Kouilou Region and educated at Loango Mission School, Republic of the Congo and became Station Master in Pointe-Noire railway station in 1936. He served as Minister of Foreign Affairs from 1960 to 1963 and Vice President of the Republic of the Congo from 1961 to 1963.
