= List of ministers of finance of the Republic of the Congo =

This is a list of ministers of finance of the Republic of the Congo since 1958:

- Joseph Vial, 1958-1960
- Pierre Goura, 1960-1963
- Emmanuel Ebouka Babakas, 1963-1968
- Pierre Félicien Nkoua, 1968-1969
- Charles-Maurice Sianard, 1969-1970
- Boniface Matingou, 1970-1971
- Ange Edouard Poungui, 1971-1973
- Saturnin Okabe, 1973-1976
- Alphonse Souchlaty Poaty, 1976-1983
- Henri Lopes, 1983
- Justin Lekoundzou, 1983-1989
- Edouard Gakosso, 1989-1991
- Edouard Ebouka-Babackas, 1991-1992
- Clément Mouamba, 1992-1993
- Nguila Moungounga Nkombo, 1993-1997
- Luc Daniel Adamo Mateta, 1997
- Mathias Dzon, 1997-2002
- Rigobert Roger Andely, 2002-2005
- Pacifique Issoïbeka, 2005-2009
- Gilbert Ondongo, 2009-2016
- Calixte Nganongo, 2016-2021
- Rigobert Roger Andely, 2021-2021
- Jean-Baptiste Ondaye, 2021-2024
- Christian Yoka 2024-present

== See also ==
- Economy of the Republic of the Congo
