= Joseph Badiabio =

Congolese politician

Joseph Badiabio is a Congolese politician. A member of the Congolese Movement for Democracy and Integral Development (MCDDI), he has been a Deputy in the National Assembly of Congo-Brazzaville since 2007. He served for a time as President of the MCDDI Parliamentary Group, and since 2012 he has been Second Quaestor of the National Assembly.

== Political career ==
In the June 2007 parliamentary election, Badiabio was elected to the National Assembly as the MCDDI candidate in the second constituency of Makélékélé, a district of Brazzaville. He won the seat with 55% of the vote. In the National Assembly, he served as Secretary of the Economic and Financial Affairs Commission. Following the death of MCDDI President Bernard Kolelas in November 2009, Badiabio was elected to replace him as President of the MCDDI Parliamentary Group during the seventh ordinary session of the National Assembly, and Serge Victor Ignoumba was elected to replace Badiabio as Secretary of the Economic and Financial Affairs Commission.

In the July–August 2012 parliamentary election, Badiabio was re-elected to the National Assembly as the MCDDI candidate in the second constituency of Makélékélé; he won the seat in the first round of voting. On 5 September 2012, when the deputies met to choose the members of the National Assembly's bureau for the new parliamentary term, Badiabio was elected as Second Quaestor of the National Assembly; he received 132 votes from the 138 deputies who voted.

Standing as an MCDDI candidate, Badiabio was elected as a local councillor in Makélékélé in the September 2014 local elections.

In the July 2017 parliamentary election, he was re-elected to the National Assembly as an independent candidate in the second constituency of Makélékélé, winning the seat in the first round with 71% of the vote. Although he formally stood as an independent, he was identified with a new party, the Union of Humanist Democrats (UDH-Yuki), that split away from the MCDDI.
