= Faiziddin Qahhorzoda =

Tajikistani politician

Faiziddin Qahhorzoda is a Tajik politician and current cabinet minister.

Qahhorzoda was born on 5 August 1971. He has a degree in international economics from Technological University of Tajikistan. He worked in the Technological University of Tajikistan from 1997 to 2015.

He was appointed deputy minister of economic development and trade from 2015 to 2016. He was appointed the chairman of the state investment and property management committee (GosKomInvest) from 2017 to 2018. He was appointed Minister of Finance of Tajikistan in January 2018.
