= Guy Brice Parfait Kolélas =

Republic of the Congo politician (1959–2021)

Guy Brice Parfait Kolélas (6 August 1959 – 22 March 2021) was a Congolese politician. Following the death of his father, Bernard Kolélas, he succeeded him as Interim President of the Congolese Movement for Democracy and Integral Development (MCDDI), one of Congo's main political parties, in 2010. He served in the government of Congo as Minister of Marine and Inland Fishing from 2007 to 2009 and as Minister of the Civil Service from 2009 to 2015. After placing a distant second in the 2016 parliamentary election, he founded a new party, the Union of Humanist Democrats-Yuki, in 2017.

== Early life and education ==
Kolélas was born in Brazzaville in 1959; his parents were Bernard Kolélas and his wife Jacqueline. He studied economics, obtaining a degree from Brazzaville's Marien Ngouabi University in 1983. Afterward, he continued his studies in France. He received a degree in economics from the University of Besançon in 1985 and a degree in international transport from the Mulhouse International Institute of Transport in 1987. Ultimately he obtained a doctorate degree in industrial economics, specializing in business strategy, from the University of Dijon in 1993.

== Political background and government appointment ==
Kolélas' father, Bernard Kolélas, was one of Congo's main political leaders during the 1990s. During the 1997 civil war, Bernard Kolélas served briefly as Prime Minister before he and his old rival, President Pascal Lissouba, were ousted by rebel forces loyal to Denis Sassou Nguesso in October 1997. He and Lissouba fled into exile, but some fighting continued. On 7 December 1997, Kolélas sent his son to South Africa to acquire weapons that Lissouba had previously ordered from Ebar Management & Trading Ltd., a company that sold arms to the government during the civil war. Brice Parfait Kolélas was his father's transportation adviser around that time and participated in negotiations.

In Congo, Bernard Kolélas was convicted of war crimes in absentia and sentenced to death. After eight years in exile, he was allowed to return in October 2005 so that he could participate in the funeral of his wife, Jacqueline. The government then decided to allow him to remain in Congo and participate in the nation's political life. The National Assembly unanimously approved an amnesty for Bernard Kolélas in November 2005.

The MCDDI, led by Bernard Kolélas, signed an electoral alliance with Sassou Nguesso's Congolese Labor Party (PCT) in April 2007. In the June 2007 parliamentary election, Brice Parfait Kolélas stood as the MCDDI candidate in Kinkala constituency, located in the Pool Region. The Pool Region was traditionally dominated by the MCDDI, and Kolélas easily won the Kinkala seat in the first round, receiving 77.46% of the vote. After the election, he was appointed to the government as Minister of Marine and Inland Fishing and Aquaculture on 30 December 2007.

At the MCDDI's First Convention, held in Brazzaville on 24–25 May 2008, Brice Parfait Kolélas was designated as the Coordinator of the MCDDI National Executive Bureau and National Secretary for Development Strategies. In that capacity, he was considered the second ranking member of the party, after his father. However, his father was by that point an elderly man in apparently declining health (although present, he failed to even give the closing speech at the convention), and thus Brice Parfait Kolélas was effectively being designated as the MCDDI's de facto leader. It also seemed evident that he was being positioned to succeed his father, and that arrangement was contrasted with the situation in the Union for Democracy and the Republic (UDR–Mwinda), another political party. André Milongo, the President of the UDR–Mwinda, had died in 2007 without taking the necessary steps to secure his son's succession to the party leadership; the son, Stéphane Milongo, proved unable to obtain the party leadership on his own. It was suspected that the example of the Milongos might have influenced Bernard Kolélas to promote his son to the top of the party.

Brice Parfait Kolélas also became the Coordinator of the Conference of African Humanist Democrats (Conférence des démocrates humanistes africains, CODEHA), a non-governmental organization, when it was launched at the initiative of the MCDDI and various other African political parties on 19 April 2009. CODEHA sent electoral observer missions to monitor the July 2009 presidential election in Congo as well as the August 2009 presidential election in Gabon.

== 2009 presidential campaign and MCDDI leadership ==
At the time of the July 2009 presidential election, Brice Parfait Kolélas was the Deputy National Director of President Sassou Nguesso's re-election campaign. Along with other major figures who had formerly opposed Sassou Nguesso, Kolélas was present for the launch of the campaign at a large rally held in Brazzaville in June 2009. On that occasion, he read a message on behalf of his father, in which the latter endorsed Sassou Nguesso. After winning re-election, Sassou Nguesso promoted Kolélas to the post of Minister of the Civil Service and State Reform on 15 September 2009.

Bernard Kolélas died at the age of 76 on 13 November 2009. Brice Parfait Kolélas was considered an obvious candidate to succeed him in the party leadership, although reports suggested that feelings within the party were not unanimous on the matter, with some members supporting an older figure, Bernard Tchibambelela. The MCDDI Executive Bureau met on 23 January 2010 and decided that Kolélas would serve as Interim President of the MCDDI, in addition to his role as Coordinator of the Executive Bureau, until a party congress could be held. In its previous 20 years of existence under Bernard Kolélas, the MCDDI had never held a congress.

The eighth conference of African civil service ministers was held in Brazzaville in July 2013, and Kolélas was elected as president of the conference.

Speaking to MCDDI supporters in June 2014, Kolélas sharply criticized the party's ally, the Congolese Party of Labour (PCT) for failing to fulfill its promises. He complained that the MCDDI had been promised a variety of posts—"ambassadors, prefects, mayors and many other things"—but that the PCT had not followed through. Nevertheless he said that he would not terminate the alliance, as it was "signed on the blood of our ancestors".

At an extraordinary party congress on 3–4 April 2015, Kolélas was designated as the MCDDI's candidate for the 2016 presidential election. He came out in opposition to changing the constitution to allow Sassou Nguesso to run for another term and participated in an opposition dialogue, which was held to express objections to constitutional change, in July 2015. Apparently as a consequence, he was dismissed from the government on 10 August 2015. At the same time, his brother, Euloge Landry Kolélas, was appointed to the government as Minister of Trade.

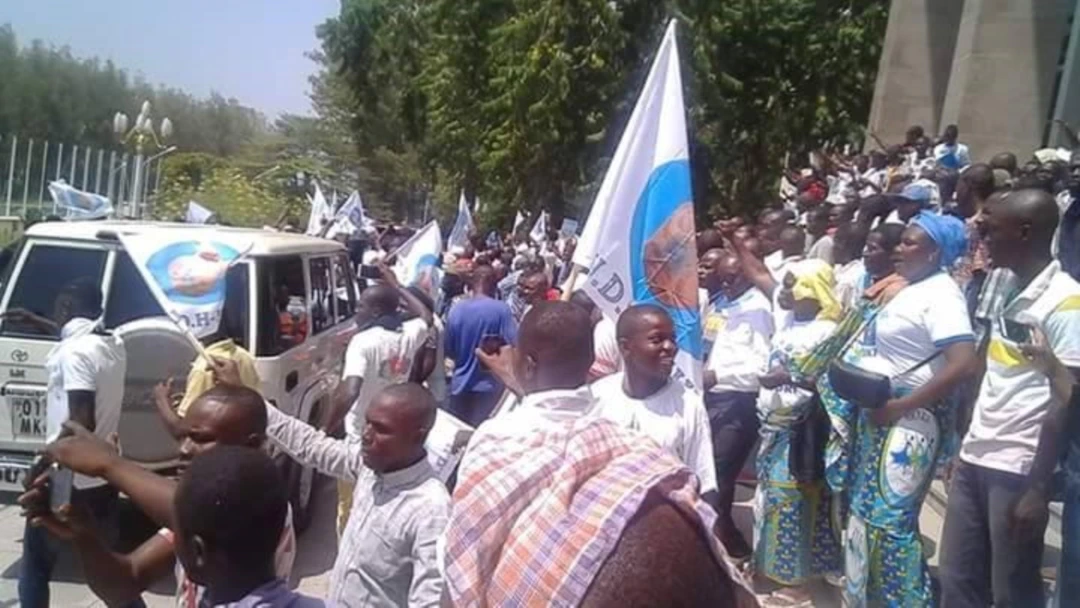
UDH-YUKI party members in 2020

Kolélas placed second in the 2016 presidential election, with 15% of the vote, and Sassou Nguesso was re-elected. Sidelined within the MCDDI, Kolélas founded a new party, the Union of Humanist Democrats (UDH-YUKI), on 19 March 2017. According to Kolélas, the new party had emerged from the "ashes" of the MCDDI.

On 1 February 2021, he was invested as a candidate for the presidential election on 17 and 21 March 2021 by his political party, the Union of Humanist Democrats-YUKI (UDH-YUKI).

== Personal life ==
Kolélas' mother, Jacqueline, died on 29 September 2005. In October 2005, he released a statement on behalf of the family, calling on everyone to respect the family's grief and insisting "that Maman is buried in a climate of peace, tranquility, understanding and brotherly love."

As of 2008, Kolélas was married and had three children.

On the eve of the March 2021 presidential election, Kolélas was evacuated to France after contracting COVID-19 and hospitalized. He said he was "fighting death". He died of COVID-19 complications on 22 March 2021.
