= Alphonse Poaty-Souchlaty =

Congolese politician (1941–2024)

Alphonse Poaty-Souchlaty (25 March 1941 – 24 October 2024) was a Congolese politician who was Prime Minister of Congo-Brazzaville from 7 August 1989 to 3 December 1990 under President Denis Sassou Nguesso.

== Background ==
Poaty-Souchlaty was born in Kouilou Department on 25 March 1941, to Alphonse Souchlaty-Poaty the Elder (died 24 March 1946), ivoirier and traveler, and Alphonsine Ndoko Ntondo.

Poaty-Souchlaty died on 24 October 2024, at the age of 83.

== Political career ==
Poaty-Souchlaty was the minister of finance from 1976 to 1983. He served in the government as Minister of Trade and Small and Medium-Sized Enterprises from 1986 to July 1989. Following the Fourth Ordinary Congress of the Congolese Labour Party (PCT) in late July 1989, he was appointed Prime Minister on 7 August, succeeding Ange-Edouard Poungui. The new government headed by Poaty-Souchlaty was named on 13 August.

After a little more than a year in office, Poaty-Souchlaty resigned on 3 December 1990, as the PCT's single-party regime was coming to an end. He resigned from the PCT at the same time. Poaty-Souchlaty was said to have disagreed with the president, Denis Sassou Nguesso, about what political course the country should take in the face of widespread demands for change.

After his resignation, Poaty-Souchlaty created the Republican Union for Progress (Union républicaine pour le progrès, URP). During the 1992 parliamentary elections, the URP received three seats. At the same time, Poaty-Souchlaty was a candidate in the August 1992 presidential election, placing 12th with 0.30% of the vote.

After leaving the URP, Poaty-Souchlaty joined the Pan-African Union for Social Democracy (UPADS) in 1992. Although he was not given a position during Pascal Lissouba's presidency from 1992 to 1997, Poaty-Souchlaty was elected as one of the party's 25 vice-presidents in December 2006, at its first extraordinary congress.

Political offices
Preceded by Ange Édouard Poungui	Prime Minister of Congo-Brazzaville; 1989–1990	Succeeded by Pierre Moussa
