= Ministry of Finance of Tajikistan =

Government ministry of Tajikistan

Ministry of Finance
- Вазорати молияи Ҷумҳурии Тоҷикистон
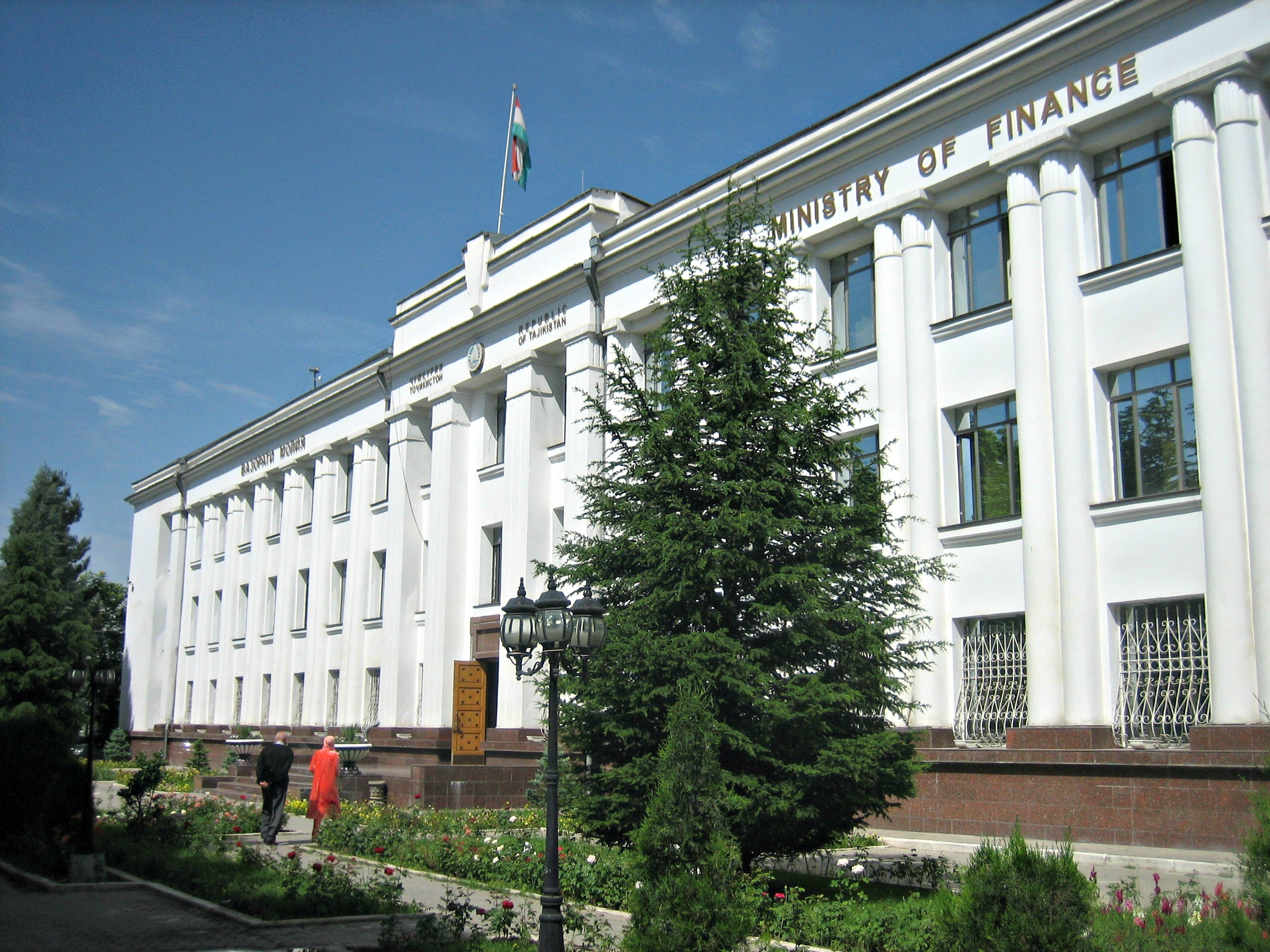
- Ministry of Finance building in Dushanbe

Government Ministry overview
- Jurisdiction: Government of Tajikistan
- Headquarters: Dushanbe, Tajikistan
- Minister responsible: Faiziddin Qahhorzoda
- Website: https://moliya.tj/en/

The Ministry of Finance (Tajik: Вазорати молияи Ҷумҳурии Тоҷикистон) is the Tajikistani government ministry which oversees the public finances of Tajikistan.

== Organization ==
=== Structure of the central office ===
- Management
- Main Directorate of the State Budget
- Main Directorate of Tax Policy and State Revenue
- Main Directorate of the Central Treasury
- Main Directorate of State Debt and Attracting Public Investments
- Main Directorate of Budget Policy in Real Sectors of the Economy
- Secretariat Office
- Management of budgets of state authorities and administration
- Directorate of Defense and Law Enforcement Budgets
- Department of accounting policy, financial reporting and auditing activities
- Internal Audit and Control Department
- Human Resources Management
- Department for monitoring financial and economic activities of large state-owned enterprises
- Legal Department
- Business Management
- Accounting and Planning Department

=== Management structure ===
- Central Leadership
- Department of Finance of GBAO
- Head of the Finance Department of the Sughd Region
- Head of the Finance Department of Khatlon Region
- Department of Finance of Dushanbe City
- Financial departments of cities and districts of the Republic of Tajikistan
- supervision of state support
- Treasury of State Resources
- State Insurance Control Service
- Agency for the Development of the Securities Market and Specialized Registration.

=== Organizations and institutions ===
- State Educational Institution "Tajikistan University of Finance and Economics"
- Research Institute "Molia" editor of the magazine "Finance and Accounting"
- Department of construction, repair and maintenance works State investment and insurance company "Tojiksarmoyazur"
- Press of the Ministry of Finance of the Republic of Tajikistan Special State Enterprise of the Republic "Tilo Tajik"
- Center for Professional Development KVD "Center for Support of Interbudgetary Financial Operations"
- KVD "Service Center for Financial Reporting"
- State Institution "Center for the Implementation of the Project "Access to Green Finance and Agricultural Development Funds".

== Ministers of finance ==
- Normat Unusov, 1991-1992
- Ismail Davlatov, 1992-1994
- Mahmad Yusunov, 1994
- Anvarsho Muzaffarov, 1994-2000
- Safarali Nadzhmiddinov, 2000-2013
- Abdusalom Kurbonov, 2013-2018
- Faiziddin Qahhorzoda, 2018-

== See also ==
- Government of Tajikistan
- Economy of Tajikistan
- National Bank of Tajikistan
