= Kōyō =

- Gender: Male

Origin
- Origin: Japanese
- Meaning: Different meanings depending on the kanji used

Kōyō, Koyo or Kouyou (written: 光洋, 光陽, 紅葉, 紅陽, 晃洋, 浩陽 or 昂洋) is a masculine Japanese given name. Notable people with the name include:

- Kōyō Aoyagi (青柳 晃洋; born 1993), Japanese baseball player
- Kōyō Ishikawa (石川 光陽; 1904–1989), Japanese photographer
- Kōyō Kawanishi (川西 浩陽; born 1959), Japanese astronomer
- Musashimaru Kōyō (武蔵丸 光洋; born 1971), American sumo wrestler
- Kōyō Okada (岡田 紅陽; 1895–1972), Japanese photographer
- Ozaki Kōyō (尾崎 紅葉; 1868–1903), Japanese writer
- Koyo Sato (佐藤 昂洋; born 1996), Japanese footballer
