= Union of Humanist Democrats-Yuki =

Union of Humanist Democrats-Yuki Union des démocrates et humanistes-Yuki
- President: Joseph Badiabio
- Founder: Guy Brice Parfait Kolélas
- Founded: 19 March 2017
- Split from: MCDDI
- Headquarters: Brazzaville
- Ideology: Liberalism; Conservatism
- Political position: Centre to centre-right
- National Assembly: 7 / 151

The Union of Humanist Democrats-Yuki (French: Union des démocrates et humanistes-Yuki; UDH-YUKI) is a political party in the Republic of the Congo.

== History ==
The party was founded on 19 March 2017. It was founded by Guy Brice Parfait Kolélas, the runner up in the 2016 presidential election.

Their annual conference was held in Brazzaville in March 2022.

== Electoral results ==
Election	Seats
2017	8 / 151
2022	7 / 151
