= Robert Bourgi =

French-Lebanese political advisor (born 1945)

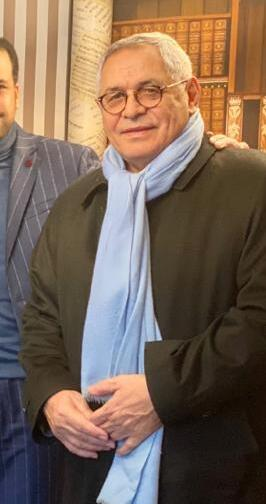
- Robert Bourgi in 2007
- Born: 4 April 1945; Dakar, Senegal
- Occupations: Businessman, political adviser
- Known for: Françafrique networks, Africa policy adviser
- Spouse: Catherine Vittori (m. 1972)
- Children: 3
- Awards: Legion of Honour

Robert Bourgi (born 4 April 1945) is a French-Lebanese businessman, politician, and the recipient of the Legion of Honour. He is best known as a close confidante and adviser to several African leaders in former French colonial states, especially Senegal, Democratic Republic of Congo, and Gabon. Bourgi was considered a major facilitator in what was known as Françafrique, France's sphere of influence over its former colonies in sub-Saharan Africa.

Bourgi was instrumental in maintaining the dense web of personal networks (or réseaux), a central feature of Françafrique, that held together the informal businesses and political relationships between French and African leaders. He was mentored by and succeeded one of the founding pillars of Francafrique, Jacques Foccart. In October 2024, he published his memoir, They Know, I Know Everything, with coauthor and political scientist Frédéric Lejeal.

== Early life and education ==
Bourgi was born in Dakar, Senegal, on 4 April 1945 to Lebanese parents who came as textile traders. Bourgi married Corsican lawyer Catherine Vittori on 7 December 1972. They have three children.

After studying at the Lycée Van-Vollenhoven in Dakar and studying law at the University of Nice and the University of Paris, he became a doctor of public law in 1978, his thesis subject was "De Gaulle and Africa", and a graduate degree in political science. Bourgi went on to teach French law in Benin, Mauritania and then the Ivory Coast.

== French politics ==
From 1981 to 1996, Bourgi was the lead Africa policy delegate for Club 89, a French foreign policy think tank connected to the Gaulist Rassemblement pour la République. In September 2007, Bourgi was presented with the Legion of Honour (France's highest civilian decoration) by President Nicolas Sarkozy.

Bourgi was a fixture of France's Africa policy and politics. In 2011, Bourgi revealed how African regimes had funded the 2002 presidential campaign of Jacques Chirac. Bourgi was involved in a corruption scandal in 2017 when the favorite to win that years election, François Fillon, was accused of accepting two designer suits from Bourgi. Emmanuel Macron went on to win the election.
