= Pierre Goura =

Congolese politician

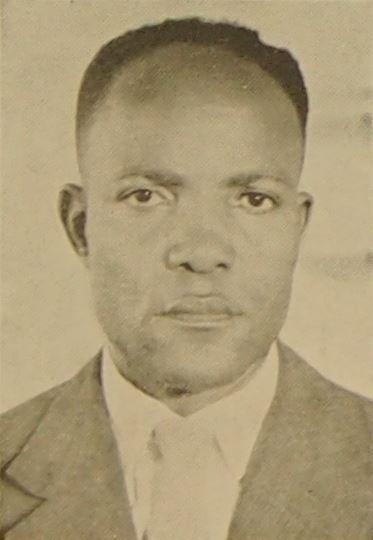
- Goura, c. 1959

Senator of Congo
- In office 1955–1958

Mayor of Dolisie
- In office 1963–1959

Minister of Finance for Republic of Congo
- In office 1960–1963

Personal details
- Born: April 19, 1912 Youa
- Died: 24 September 1996 (aged 84) Aubervilliers, France
- Party: Groupe de l'Union Démocratique et Socialiste de la Résistance et du Rassemblement Démocratique Africain

Pierre Goura (April 19, 1912 in Youa, French Equatorial Africa - September 24, 1996 in Aubervilliers, France) was a politician from the Republic of the Congo who served in the French Senate representing Congo from 1955-1958, then mayor of Dolisie (1959-1963) as well as Minister of Finance of the Republic of Congo after the independence of the country (1960-1963).

== Early life ==
Pierre Goura was born in the village of Youa, at the time located in Middle Congo (today in the district of Sibiti). He studied in a Catholic primary school, then became a clerk in the Territory's administrative services.

== Career ==
In April 1954, he was elected to the Territorial Assembly. A member of the Congolese Progressive Party (PPC), he was elected in 1946 as deputy for Niari in the Territorial Assembly and remained so until 1957. In 1952, he was elected to the Council of the Territory, of which he chaired the permanent committee, before himself becoming President of this Council in 1954.

On June 19, 1955, he was elected to the Council of the Republic (France), becoming a senator representing the 2nd section of Middle Congo. He sat on the Commission for Industrial Production, then for Agriculture. First attached to the group of the Democratic Left and the RGR, he joined the group of Independents from overseas at the end of 1955.

As a senator, he spoke during 1955 on the subject of the military credits of the Ministry of Overseas France, as well as on the municipal reorganization of Overseas France. Then, in 1956, he asked for the second modernization and equipment plan to have more impact in French Equatorial Africa, and also spoke about the draft framework law relating to overseas territories. In July 1957, he declared that he would vote for the ratification of the treaty on the European Common Market, believing that the latter could improve economic and social progress overseas. However, he expressed his concerns, fearing that the indigenous populations were not considered as full partners within the EEC.

In 1957, he became a member of the Democratic Union for the Defense of African Interests. Then, on June 2 and 3, 1958, he voted for the constitutional revision, as well as for full powers.

In 1959, he was elected mayor of the town of Dolisie. Then, following Congo's independence in 1960, he participated in the creation of the first Republic of Congo alongside President Fulbert Youlou, of whom he became Minister of Finance.
