= Technological University of Tajikistan =

Coordinates: 38.5303°N 68.7586°E

- Motto: Scientia unescamus (We unite with knowledge)
- Type: Public
- Established: 1990
- Academic staff: 280
- Students: 5884
- Location: Str. Negmat Karabaev 63/3, Dushanbe, Tajikistan
- Campus: Urban
- Website: https://tut.tj

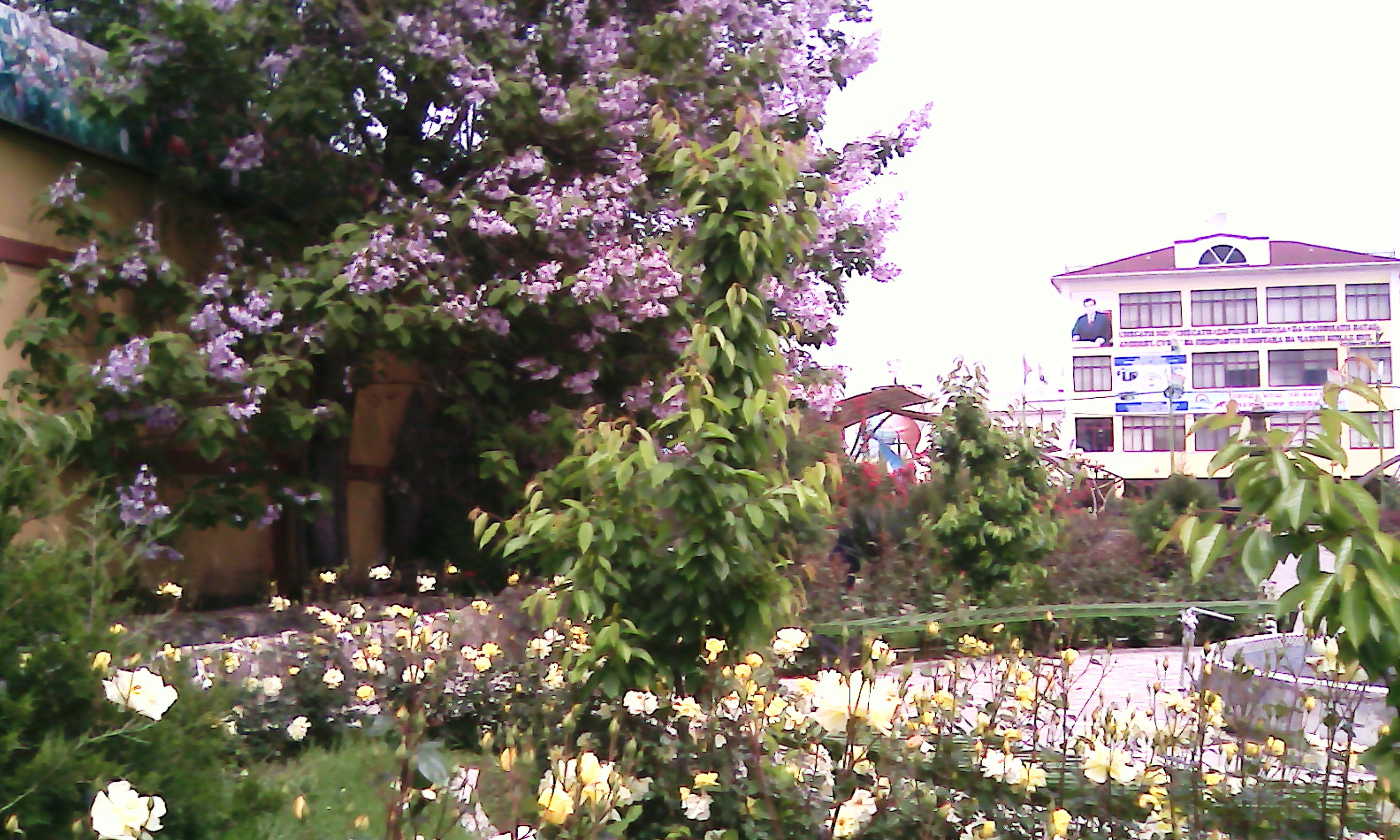

Technological University of Tajikistan (Tajik: Донишгоҳи технологии Тоҷикистон, romanized: Donishgohi tekhnologii Tojikiston; Russian: технологический университет Таджикистана, ТУТ) is a private educational institution in Dushanbe, focused on training specialists in the light and food industries. It was established on September 20, 1990, as the Tajik Higher College of Technology by a resolution of the Council of Ministers of the Republic.

Its Textile Industry Program trains students as technicians, managers, designers, and artists in the production of textiles and apparel. The university's Khujand branch has partnered with the University of Nebraska–Lincoln to develop a center for entrepreneurial education and a cultural museum for textiles to deliver community extension and educational outreach programs.
