= Tahir Hamid Nguilin =

Chadian politician

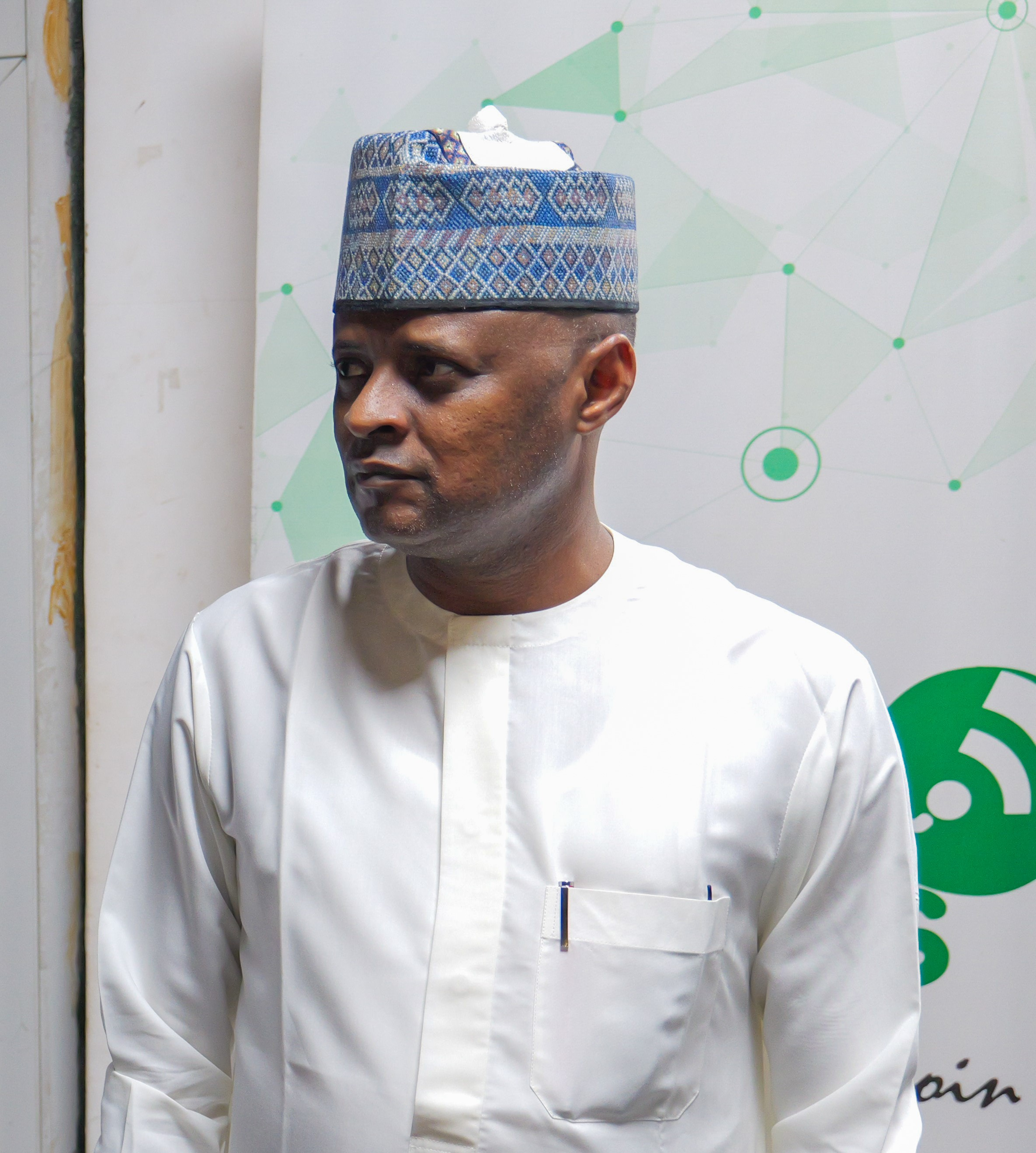
Tahir Hamid Nguilin

Tahir Hamid Nguilin or Tahir Hamit Nguilign is a Chadian politician and civil servant. He has been Chad's Minister of Finance and Budget since June 2019.

He was the director general of the treasury 2005-2006 and director general of taxes 2006-2008. From 2016 to 2018 he was the CEO of SHT, Chad's national oil company.
