= Calixte Ganongo =

Congolese political figure

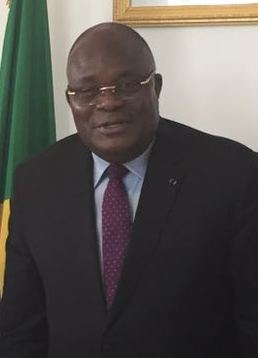
Calixte Nganongo in 2017

Calixte Ganongo is a Congolese political figure who has served in the government of Congo-Brazzaville as Minister of Finance since 2016.

Ganongo, who is from the northern town of Oyo (also the hometown of President Denis Sassou Nguesso), worked at the national oil company, the Société nationale des pétroles du Congo. He was appointed as Deputy Director-General of the SNPC, in charge of finances and accounting, on 29 December 2010.

After Sassou Nguesso's victory in the March 2016 presidential election, he appointed Ganongo to the government as Minister of Finance on 30 April 2016.
