= Mathias Dzon =

Congolese politician

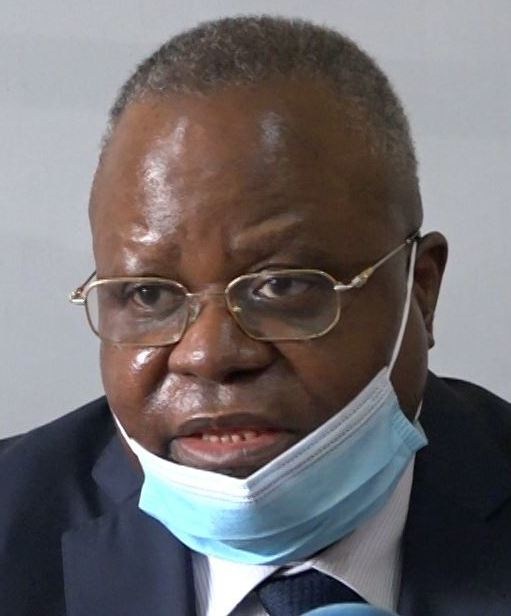
Mathias Dzon in August 2020

Mathias Dzon (born 1947) is a Congolese politician who served in the government of the Republic of the Congo as Minister of Finance from 1997 to 2002. Subsequently he was the National Director of the Bank of Central African States (BEAC) from 2003 to 2008 and a candidate in the July 2009 presidential election, although he decided to boycott the election shortly before it was held. He is the President of the Patriotic Union for National Renewal (UPRN).

== Political career ==
Dzon was born in Ingouélé, near Gamboma. After studying in France, he began working at the BEAC in September 1977, rising to senior management positions. He became Director-General of the International Bank of Congo (BIDC) in April 1985.

During the single-party rule of the Congolese Labour Party (PCT), which ended in 1991, Dzon was not a member the ruling party. He helped to found the UPRN in 1991 and became its President. He participated in the 1991 Sovereign National Conference, and during the Conference he placed fourth in the vote for the position of transitional Prime Minister. He was subsequently elected to the National Assembly as the UPRN candidate in Gamboma constituency. Under Dzon's leadership, the UPRN did not initially support the government or the opposition, but in September 1994 it joined the Democratic and Patriotic Forces (FDP) opposition coalition, thereby allying itself with the PCT, led by Denis Sassou Nguesso.

Dzon resigned from his post as Director-General of the BIDC in 1995 and instead took a post at the BEAC's agency in Pointe-Noire. He went into exile in 1996, going to Gabon and then France. Following Sassou Nguesso's return to power in the June–October 1997 civil war, Dzon returned to Congo-Brazzaville from France and was appointed by Sassou Nguesso as Minister of Finance and the Budget on 2 November 1997. He was retained in the government named on 12 January 1999 as Minister of the Economy, Finance, and the Budget.

In September 1999, the National Federation of Teachers called for Dzon to be prosecuted for alleged embezzlement of the salaries of teachers in August and September 1998. Speaking on television in January 2000, Dzon announced measures intended to fight corruption. He said in April 2000 that someone had tried to poison him with a paralysing liquid that was injected into his clothes. According to Dzon, the clothes were injected while in his suitcase at the Maya-Maya Airport as he prepared to fly to an International Monetary Fund conference in Washington, DC. The clothes subsequently changed color, were tested at a laboratory in the United States, and were found to contain a toxic substance. He did not specify who he believed to be responsible for this, but said that the people involved wanted him to replace him as Finance Minister.

In the May 2002 parliamentary election, Dzon stood as a candidate in Gamboma constituency, but shortly after the election he was disqualified by the National Electoral Commission, along with 11 other candidates. The disqualification was based on an allegation that he gave his supporters fraudulent documents to use in the election; in addition, he was alleged to have threatened officials. Although most of the candidates who were disqualified were banned from ever running in an election again, Dzon was not subjected to that penalty and was merely warned. After the election, he was replaced as Finance Minister by Roger-Rigobert Andely in the government that was appointed on 18 August 2002; Andely succeeded Dzon at his ministry on 20 August.

After leaving the government, Dzon was appointed as the BEAC's National Director for Congo, and he took office on 14 May 2003. The newspaper Le Choc reported on 20 July 2004 that Dzon, together with three other current or former ministers, had been barred from leaving the country without Sassou Nguesso's approval due to suspicions that they had misused public funds. This report was denied on the next day by public prosecutor Georges Akiéra.

The UPRN went into opposition in 2007, demanding the establishment of an independent electoral commission and boycotting the 2007 parliamentary election. It joined a new opposition coalition, the Alliance for the Republic and Democracy (ARD), in October 2007. On 25 June 2008, the UPRN announced that it had nominated Dzon to be the ARD candidate in the 2009 presidential election. No other names were submitted for the ARD nomination, and on 22 September 2008, ARD President Jean-Paul Bouiti announced that Dzon had been adopted as the coalition's candidate. In an interview with the African Press Agency in September 2008, Dzon said that Congo-Brazzaville needed "radical change", arguing that the country's high level of economic growth was not improving the living standards of ordinary people or state of infrastructure. Dzon left his post as National Director of the BEAC on 31 December 2008.

On 10 July 2009, two days before the presidential election, Dzon (who was considered the most important opposition candidate) and five other candidates called for the election to be delayed, claiming that the electoral lists were deeply flawed and included people who were not eligible to vote, as well as people who did not exist at all. At an opposition rally later on the same day, Dzon and other candidates called for the people to boycott the election. Dzon declared on the occasion that "for us, the election is not taking place on 12 July ... It will take place on the day the Congolese people are given a real choice."

As President of ARD, Dzon announced on 6 August 2010 that the coalition would not participate in the celebrations on 15 August marking the 50th anniversary of Congolese independence. He said that it was not an appropriate occasion to celebrate, as events since independence had, in his view, been full of disappointment and despair; according to Dzon, the day would instead be a time of remembrance and reflection for the people. In Dzon's assessment, "fifty years of independence are marked by failure. They are splattered with blood." He also criticized the government for spending money on the independence celebration while the people endured continuing poverty and deprivation.

On 5 June 2014, Dzon complained in a press conference that the government was mistreating him by refusing to allow him to leave the country, vowing to take the matter to international courts. He said that he had been barred from leaving the country on the previous day in order to have a medical check-up and visit family in France. According to Dzon, no explanation was given for the decision to bar him from leaving the country.

He was a candidate for the 2021 presidential election.
