= Denis Sassou Nguesso =

President of the Republic of the Congo (1979–1992; since 1997)

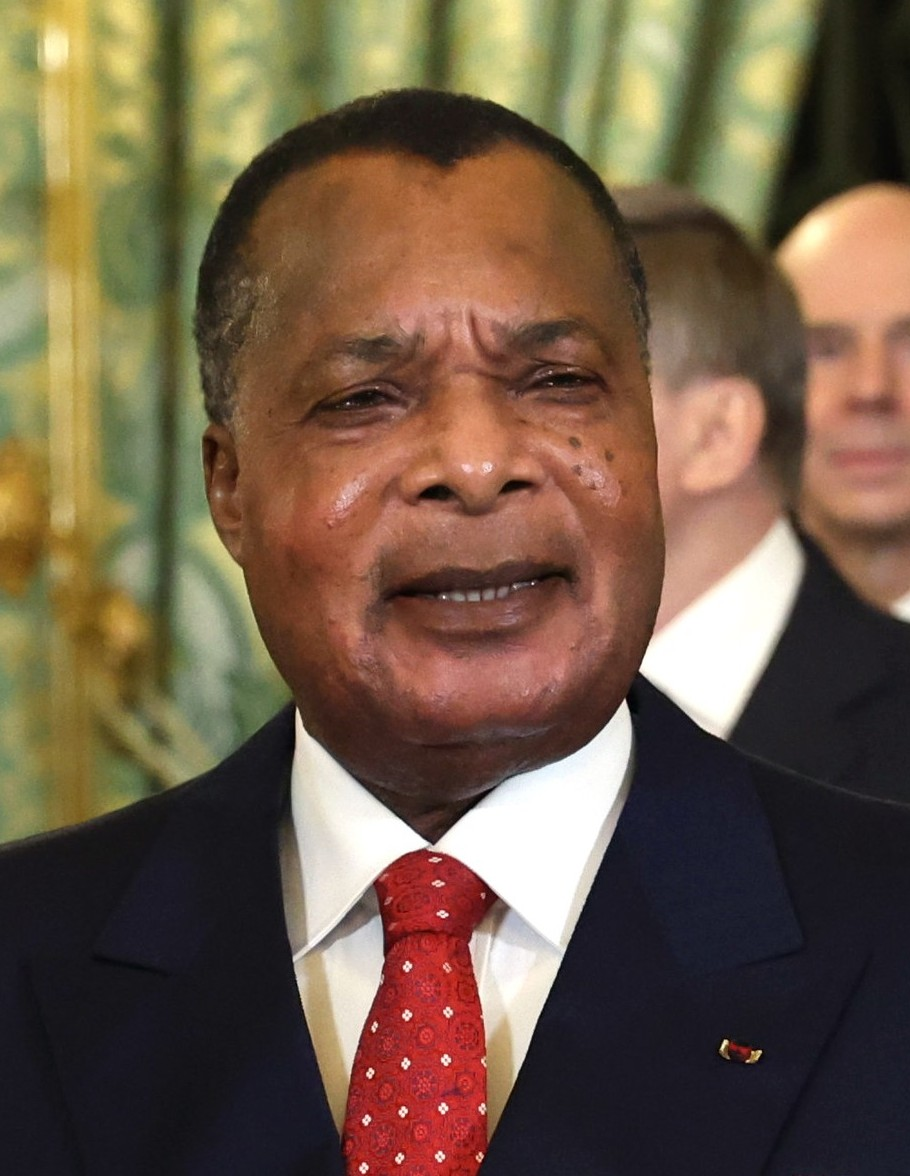
- Sassou Nguesso in 2026

5th President of the Republic of the Congo (Note: As President of the People's Republic of the Congo until 15 March 1992)
- Incumbent
- Assumed office 25 October 1997
- Prime Minister: Isidore Mvouba; Clément Mouamba; Anatole Collinet Makosso
- Preceded by: Pascal Lissouba
- In office 8 February 1979 – 31 August 1992
- Prime Minister: Louis Sylvain Goma; Ange Édouard Poungui; Alphonse Poaty-Souchlaty; Pierre Moussa; Louis Sylvain Goma; André Milongo
- Preceded by: Jean-Pierre Thystère Tchicaya (acting)
- Succeeded by: Pascal Lissouba

Personal details
- Born: 23 November 1943 (age 82) Edou, French Equatorial Africa
- Party: Congolese Party of Labour (1969–present)
- Spouse: Antoinette Loemba Tchibota (m. 1969)
- Relations: Aimé Emmanuel Yoka (uncle); Pierre Anga (uncle)
- Children: Denis-Christel Sassou Nguesso; Edith Lucie Sassou Nguesso

Military service
- Allegiance: Republic of the Congo
- Branch: Armed Forces of the Congo
- Years of service: 1960–present
- Rank: General

Denis Sassou Nguesso (French pronunciation: [dəni sasu ŋɡeso]; born 23 November 1943) is a Congolese politician and former military officer who has served as president of the Republic of the Congo since 1997. He also previously served as president of the People's Republic of the Congo from 1979 to 1992.

Sassou Nguesso headed the Congolese Party of Labour (PCT) for 12 years during his first period as president. His daughter Edith Lucie married Gabonese president Omar Bongo in 1989. He introduced multiparty politics in 1990, but was stripped of executive powers by the 1991 National Conference, remaining in office as a ceremonial head of state. He stood as a candidate in the 1992 presidential election but placed third.

Sassou Nguesso was an opposition leader for five years before returning to power during the Second Republic of the Congo Civil War, in which his rebel forces ousted President Pascal Lissouba. Following a transitional period, he won the 2002 presidential election, which involved low opposition participation. He was re-elected in the 2009 presidential election. Sassou Nguesso passed a new constitution via referendum in 2015 amidst calls for boycott then a dismissal of results by opposition leaders. The new constitution enabled him to stand for another term. Sassou Nguesso was re-elected in the 2016, 2021, and 2026 presidential elections with a majority in the first round.

== Early life ==
A member of the Mbochi ethnic group, Sassou Nguesso was born in Edou in the Oyo district in northern Congo, on 23 November 1943. His parents were Julien Nguesso and Émilienne Mouebara. Nguesso was the youngest child in the family. His father was a notable hunter chief in Edou. He received primary education in Fort Rousset, now Owando. He studied in Dolisie Normal College between 1956 and 1960.

== Military career ==
He joined the army in 1960 just before the country was granted independence. He received military training in Algeria. In 1962, he returned to Congo and was reassigned to active duty with the rank of second lieutenant. A year later, he joined the Application School for Infantry, at Saint-Maixent-l'École, France whence he graduated with the rank of lieutenant. He returned to join Congo's elite paratroop regiment. He was one of the first officers of the Airborne Group, the first paratroop battalion of the Congolese Army, which was created by Marien Ngouabi in 1965. He commanded the Airborne Group, the army and the Brazzaville Military Zone (ZAB), and then headed the Intelligence department of the State Security Services. He became captain, then commander, and was promoted to colonel (1978) and later as army general (1989).

== Political career ==
=== 1963–1979: Early political career ===
He was part of the 1968 military coup that overthrew president Alphonse Massamba-Débat and brought Marien Ngouabi to power. He was a founding member of the National Revolution Council (Conseil National de la revolution) in December 1968.

In 1968, Sassou Nguesso took part in the military coup led by Commander Marien Ngouabi against Debat: He was a member of the Congolese National Revolution Council (Conseil National de la révolution) established on 5 August 1968. Under the leadership of Marien Ngouabi, the group limited the president's powers, before the latter finally resigned on 3 September 1968. Ngouabi officially became head of state in January 1969.

In December 1969, Sassou Nguesso was elected as a member of the first central committee of the new Congolese Labor Party (Parti Congolais du travail, PCT). It was a communist party with a Marxist–Leninist doctrine. It was headed by Marien Ngouabi as president of the central committee, president of the republic and head of state. A new constitution was issued on 31 December 1969, which designated the country as the People's Republic of Congo.

In March 1970, following a failed coup attempted by Pierre Kinganga, a former lieutenant who was exiled in the neighboring Congo-Kinshasa, an extraordinary session of the PCT's congress was held, during which Sassou Nguesso integrated the political bureau of the PCT. On 18 May 1973, Sassou Nguesso, who had been corps commander of the airborne group, was made Director of State Security. In 1975, amid an economic crisis, an extraordinary session of the PCT central committee was summoned. The eight members of the political bureau resigned and were replaced by a restricted "Revolutionary Special General Staff" (Etat major spécial révolutionnaire), composed of five members, including Sassou Nguesso, and headed by Marien Ngouabi. At the end of the extraordinary session, Marien Ngouabi asked Sassou Nguessou and five other members for a report on the economic and political situation. The paper became known as the "Declaration of 12 December 1975". It recommended the "radicalization" of the revolution. In the same period, he was appointed Minister of Defense and Security at age 32. On 18 March 1977, president Marien Ngouabi was assassinated. Official media stated that the assassination was conducted by a commando group led by Capt. Barthelemey Kikadidi. Others claimed that the assassination was plotted by military officers within the close circle of power.

A Military Committee of the Congolese Labor Party (Comité militaire du PCT) composed of eleven officers and led by Major Sassou Nguesso immediately took power and repealed the 1973 constitution. Sassou Nguesso acted as interim head of state from 18 March to 6 April 1977, then he conceded his position to general Joachim Yhombi-Opango, who became president. Sassou Nguesso held the position of 1st vice president of the committee, while retaining his position of minister of defense.

Shortly after the Ngouabi assassination, Massamba-Debat and his former prime minister Pascal Lissouba were arrested and accused by a courts-martial of plotting the assassination. Massamba-Debat was executed on 25 March 1977. Sassou Nguesso was appointed provisional president on 8 February, before being confirmed, during a special congress on 31 March 1979 as head of the central committee, President of the Republic, head of state and President of the council of ministers, for five years.

On 8 July 1979, general elections were held and confirmed the PCT as the dominant political force: the Congolese Labor Party won all the seats in the People's National Assembly. A new constitution was adopted by referendum, confirming the socialist foundations of the country.

=== 1979–1991: First three presidential terms ===
As the newly elected president, Sassou Nguesso negotiated loans from the International Monetary Fund and allowed foreign investors from France and the Americas to conduct oil and mineral extraction.

Although he was considered by French diplomats as representative of the radical wing of the PCT and as the Soviet Union and Cuba's man, Sassou Nguessou developed and maintained strong relationships with France on which he relied to support the flagging economy. The French oil company Elf Aquitaine played an important role in the exploitation of Congolese oil fields that led to the doubling of oil production and in supporting Congolese government expenses via pre-financing loans.

He visited France in October 1979 and in July 1981 to seek economic support. In October 1980, high-ranking French political figures, including then-President Valery Giscard d'Estaing and former prime ministers Jacques Chirac and Pierre Messmer, were guests to the celebration of the centenary of the establishment of Brazzaville.

In May 1980 Sassou Nguessou signed a twenty-year friendship pact with the Soviet Union and in the same year sent two delegations to China while a Chinese minister visited Brazzaville. However, the economic impact of these relationships remained marginal: France provided up to 50% of the country's foreign aid while the Soviet Union's contribution did not exceed 1.5%.

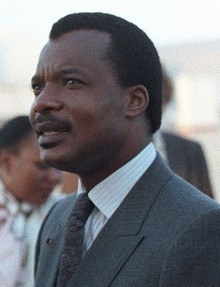
Denis Sassou Nguesso in 1986

Sassou Nguesso was re-elected for a five-year term as President of the PCT Central Committee and President of the Republic at the party's Third Ordinary Congress on 27–31 July 1984, He announced the release of Yhombi-Opango. He served as Chairman of the Organization of African Unity from 1986 to 1987. In late 1987 he faced down a serious military revolt in the north of the country with French aid.

At the PCT's Fourth Ordinary Congress on 26–31 July 1989, Sassou Nguesso was re-elected as President of the PCT Central Committee and President of the Republic, and the PCT won all of the seats of the People's National Assembly.

He introduced multiparty politics in 1990 and was then stripped of executive powers by the 1991 National Conference, remaining in office as a ceremonial head of state. He stood as a candidate in the 1992 presidential election but placed third.

In February 1991, a national conference began; the opposition gained control of the conference. The conference's declaration of its own sovereignty was not challenged by Sassou Nguesso. He was subjected to serious criticism and allegations during the Conference, including a claim from some delegates that he was involved in Ngouabi's assassination.

=== 1992–1997: First Civil War and election campaigns ===
The first round of elections took place on 24 June, and the second on 19 July. Senate elections took place on 26 July. In the parliamentary election of June–July 1992, the PCT won only 19 of 125 seats in the National Assembly; the Pan-African Union for Social Democracy (UPADS) led by former prime minister Pascal Lissouba, was the largest party. But it could not obtain an absolute majority in the National Assembly, with the Congolese Movement for Democracy and Integral Development (MCDDI) led by former army General Bernard Kolelas in second position.

In the August 1992 presidential election, Sassou Nguesso was eliminated in the first round, placing third with 17% of the vote. He fared poorly everywhere except the north. The second round was held between Lissouba (UPADS) and Kolelas (MCDDI); Sassou Nguesso backed Lissouba, who won in the second round with 61.32% of the vote.

Lissouba became President of the Republic on 31 August and a new Cabinet headed by Prime Minister Stephane Bongho-Nouarra of UPADS, was formed on 7 August. In the meantime, a new alliance of seven parties, including the MCDDI and the Rally for Democracy and Social Progress (RDPS) was constituted. It was soon joined by the PCT, which was unhappy with the distribution of ministerial portfolios, thus ensuring a new parliamentary majority.

On 31 October, the National Assembly approved a motion of no confidence against Bongho-Nouarra who resigned. On 17 November, President Lissouba dissolved Parliament, announcing elections to break the deadlock. In December, Claude Antoine Dacosta was appointed prime minister at the head of a transitional government.

Civil war started in November 1993, when the opposition parties (UDR and PCT) contested the results of the parliamentary elections (October 1993) giving victory to the coalition supporting President Lissouba (Tendance présidentielle). Armed militia supporting President Lissouba (Cocoyes, Zoulous and Mambas) clashed with Kolelas' Ninjas and Sassous Nguesso's Cobras. The conflict ended in December 1995, but left at least 2,000 dead and more than 100,000 displaced.

After this episode Sassou Nguesso spent seven months in Paris in 1996, returning on 26 January 1997 to contest the presidential election scheduled for July.

=== 1997–2008: Second Civil War and return to the presidency ===
The second round of the civil war erupted a few weeks before the presidential election.

In May 1997, a visit by Sassou Nguesso to Owando, Yhombi-Opango's political stronghold, led to the outbreak of violence between his supporters and those of Yhombi-Opango. On 5 June 1997, government forces surrounded Sassou Nguesso's home in the Mpila section of Brazzaville, attempting to arrest Pierre Aboya and Engobo Bonaventure, who had been implicated in the violence. Fighting broke out between government forces and Cobras, which led to the second civil war.

At the beginning of the conflict, Kolelas' militia remained neutral, but on 8 September 1997, he joined the president's camp and became prime minister. On 18 September, Angolan troops and airforce entered the battle, providing significant support to Sassou Nguesso. By 14 October a final assault covered by Angolan MiG aircraft was launched on the Presidential Palace and neighborhoods in south Brazzaville, then on Pointe Noire, against the President's militias (Zoulou, Cocoys, Aubervillois and Mambas) and the Ninjas.

By October, Sassou Nguesso was in control, while Lissouba as well as Kolelas and Opango left the country. On 25 October 1997, Sassou Nguesso was sworn in.

He repealed the 1992 Constitution, and replaced it with a "Fundamental Act" that concentrated power in the President's hands. General Sassou Nguesso accumulated the functions of President of the Republic, Head of State, Head of Government, Minister of Defense and Supreme Chief of the Armies.

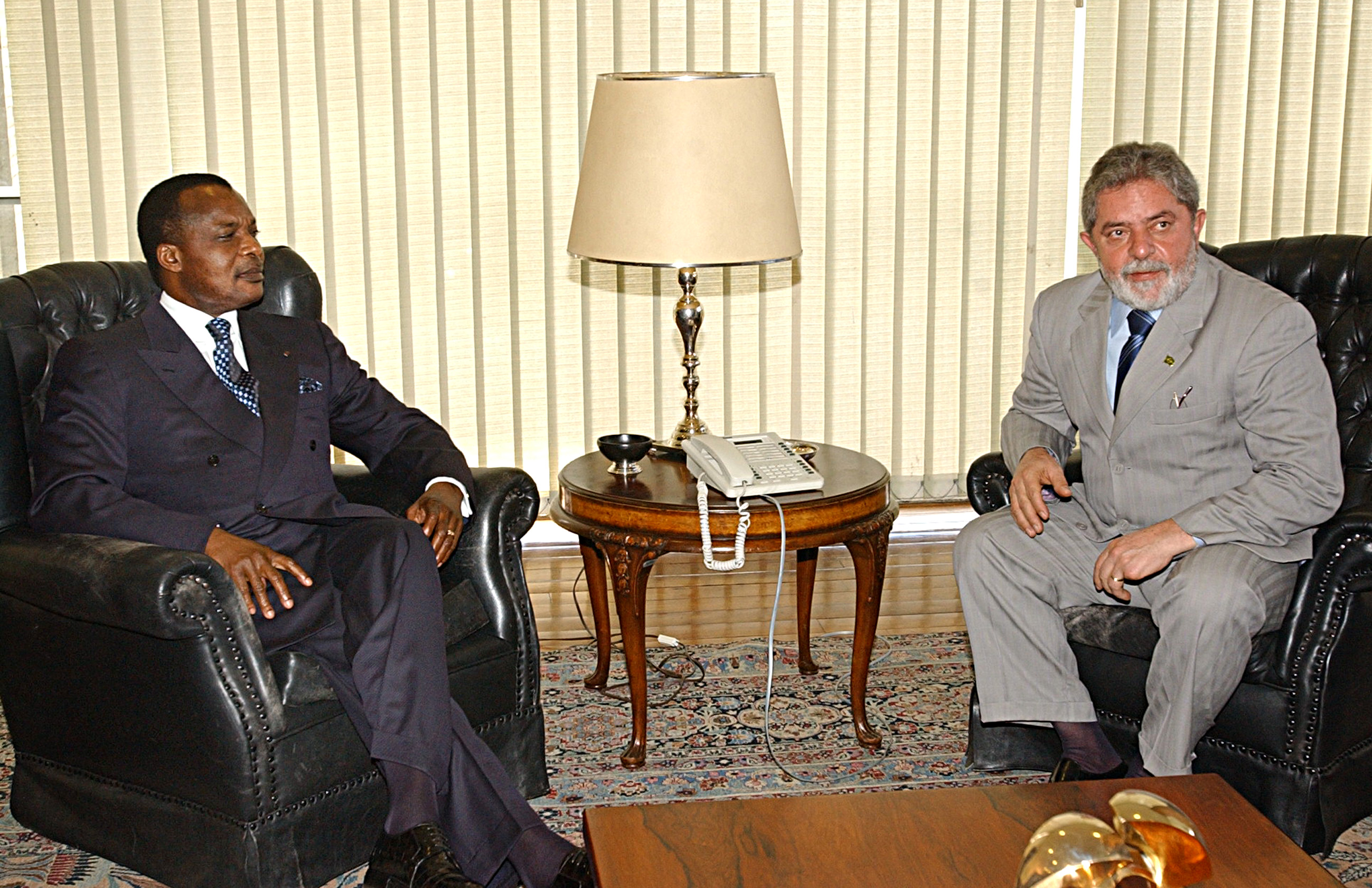
Luiz Inácio Lula da Silva (right) and Sassou Nguesso in June 2005

A government was announced on 2 November 1997; it consisted mainly of members and relatives of the FDU (Forces Démocratiques unifies, a coalition between the PCT and other parties supporting Sassou Nguesso) as well as two members respectively of UPADS and MCDDI, who were not chosen by the presidents in exile.

He also called for a national reconciliation forum. However, the idea was rejected by Lissouba's followers who continued to strike into the region between the country's economic capital, Pointe Noire and Brazzaville, having cut the railway between the coast and Brazzaville for three months. In December 1997 heavy fighting resumed in the capital's southern suburbs (the Pool area) where the Ninja militia clashed with Congolese and Angolan troops and Cobra militiamen. As many as 1,500 may have been killed in the fighting, and thousands more fled to escape the violence.

The Forum for Unity and National Reconciliation was held from 5 to 8 January 1998 with 1,420 delegates. It decided upon a transitional period of three years, to be followed by elections under a new Constitution. It also formed a 75-member National Transitional Council (NTC) to act as a legislative body. Members were elected by the forum by mid-January. However, violence did not end. By April 1998, militias opposed to Sassou Nguesso operated throughout southern Congo, coordinating their operations. In the beginning of 1999, violence had resumed in Brazzaville. Peace agreements were signed on 25 December under the auspices of President Omar Bongo of Gabon, ending the civil war, leaving 8,000–10,000 dead, around 800,000 displaced persons and a devastated country.

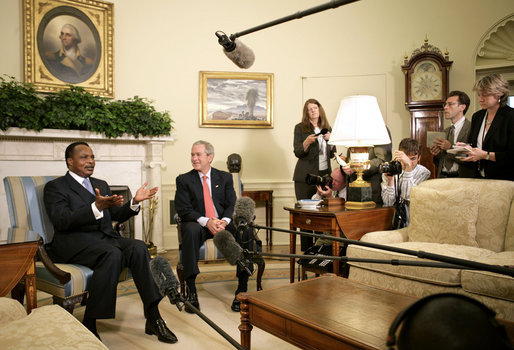
Sassou Nguesso and George W. Bush in the Oval Office in 2006

Presidential elections were held on 10 March 2002. 12 candidates entered the race, but only seven remained throughout the electoral process. Two candidates were disqualified by the Supreme Court on 10 February 2002 while two (Martin Mberi and General Anselme Makoumbou) withdrew from the race, on 6 March, protesting a lack of transparency in the electoral process. On 10 March, two days before the election, Andre Milongo, seen as the main challenger, withdrew, also citing a lack of transparency and calling for a boycott.

The elections passed peacefully and Sassou Nguesso won with 89.41% of the votes. Serious malfunctions and acts of manipulation in a few electoral commissions were reported by the European Union Election Observation Mission, who reported that these acts did not impact the final result, and called for the sanction of those responsible in order to prevent the situation from happening again in the next elections.

Sassou Nguesso was elected Chairman of the African Union, the OAU's successor body, in January 2006. His election was the result of a compromise reached to prevent the chairmanship from going to Omar al-Bashir.

=== 2009–2016: Re-election and constitutional referendum ===
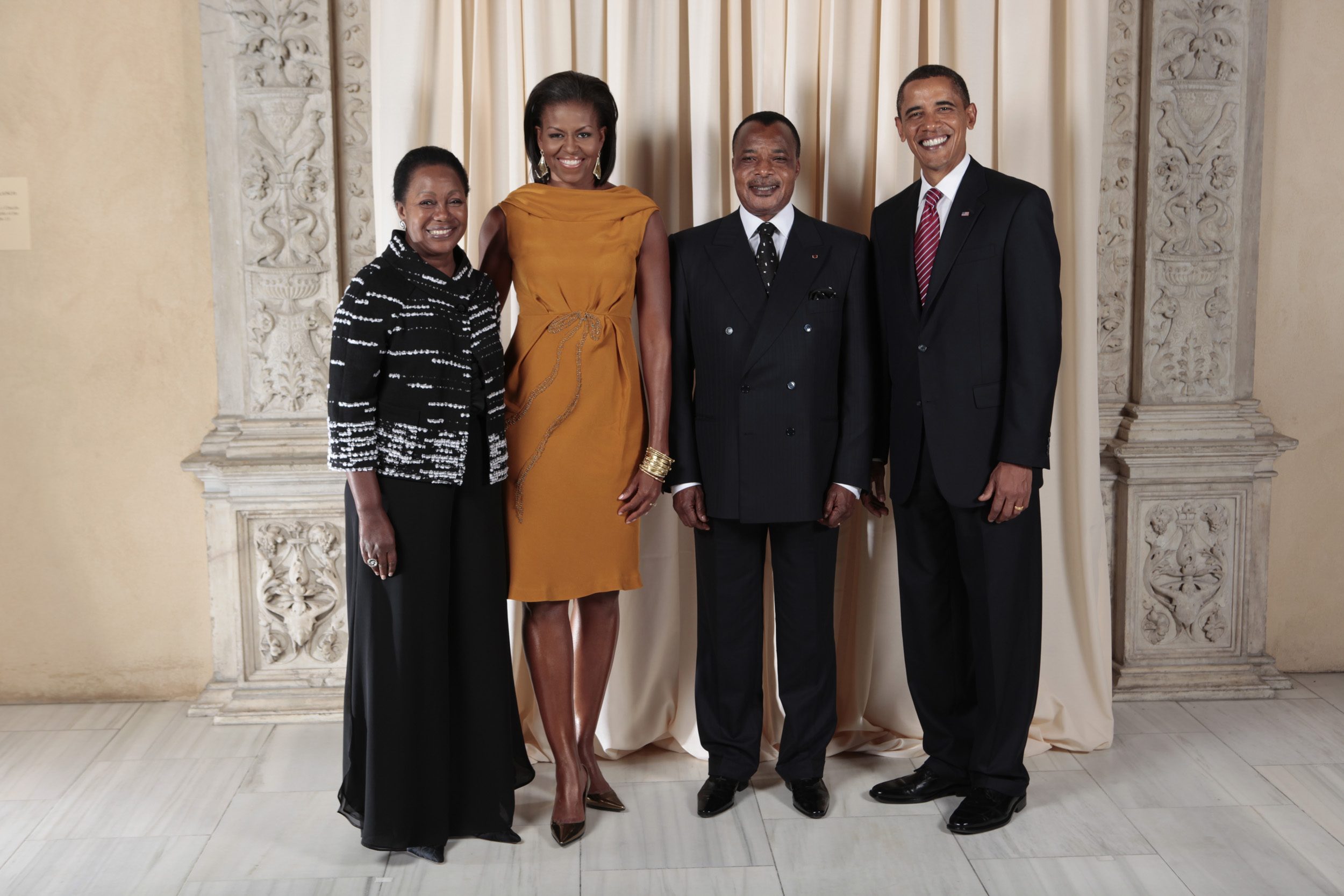
Sassou Nguesso and Antoinette with Barack and Michelle Obama in 2009

Sassou Nguesso was re-elected as President of the Central Committee of the PCT at the party's Fifth Extraordinary Congress in December 2006. He was re-elected in the July 2009 presidential election with 78.61% of the vote amidst an opposition boycott. He said that his re-election meant continued "peace, stability and security", and he called for an end to "thinking like ... freeloaders" in reference to international aid. At his inauguration Sassou Nguesso announced that he would support an amnesty bill to pardon Lissouba, who had gone into exile after his 1997 ouster and was convicted of crimes in absentia. Sassou Nguesso said that he wanted the amnesty bill to be presented to Parliament by the end of 2009. As Congo-Brazzaville prepared to celebrate the 50th anniversary of its independence from France in 2010, Sassou Nguesso noted that the country had far to go in fully realizing the dream of independence: "Our country will not be totally independent until our people are free of the yoke of poverty."

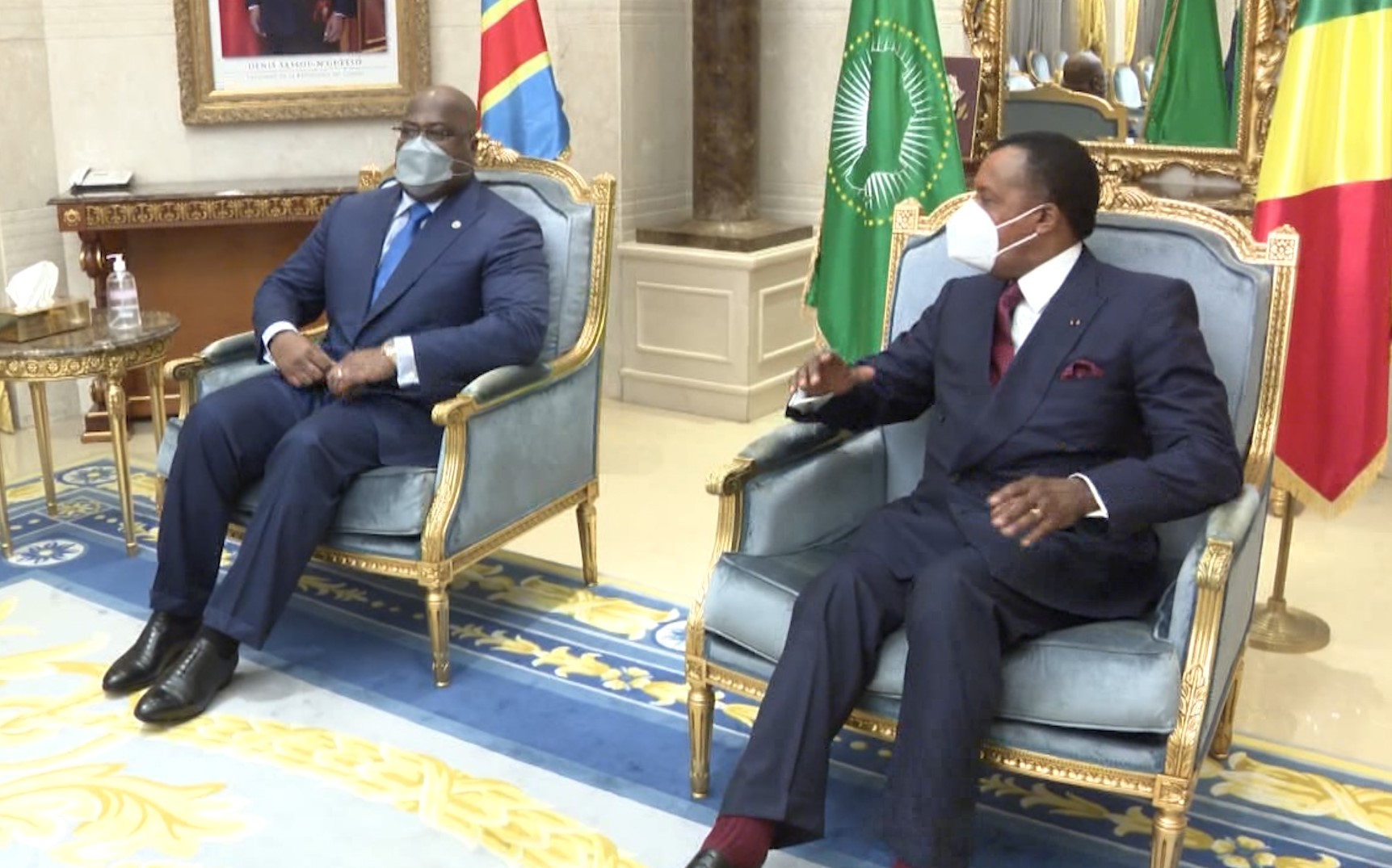
Sassou Nguesso with President of the Democratic Republic of the Congo Félix Tshisekedi in Brazzaville on 16 July 2020

On 27 March 2015 Sassou Nguesso announced that his government would hold a referendum to change the 2002 constitution, which would allow him to run for a third consecutive term. The proposal was overwhelmingly approved by voters, with 92.96% in favor. Turnout was officially placed at 72.44%. However the opposition argued that due to low turnout, the results should be annulled.

On 20 March 2016, Sassou Nguesso ran for a third consecutive term of 5 years and was reelected in the first round with 60% of the vote.

Opposition leader Guy-Brice Parfait Kolelas finished second with 15 percent of the vote while retired general Jean-Marie Mokoko, a former security adviser to Sassou Nguesso, came third with 14 percent.

For the first time in the history of the Republic, these elections were supervised by an independent commission (CNEI: Commission Nationale Electorale Indépendante). The opposition rejected the outcome, alleging fraud and calling for civil disobedience.

=== 2021: Fourth term ===
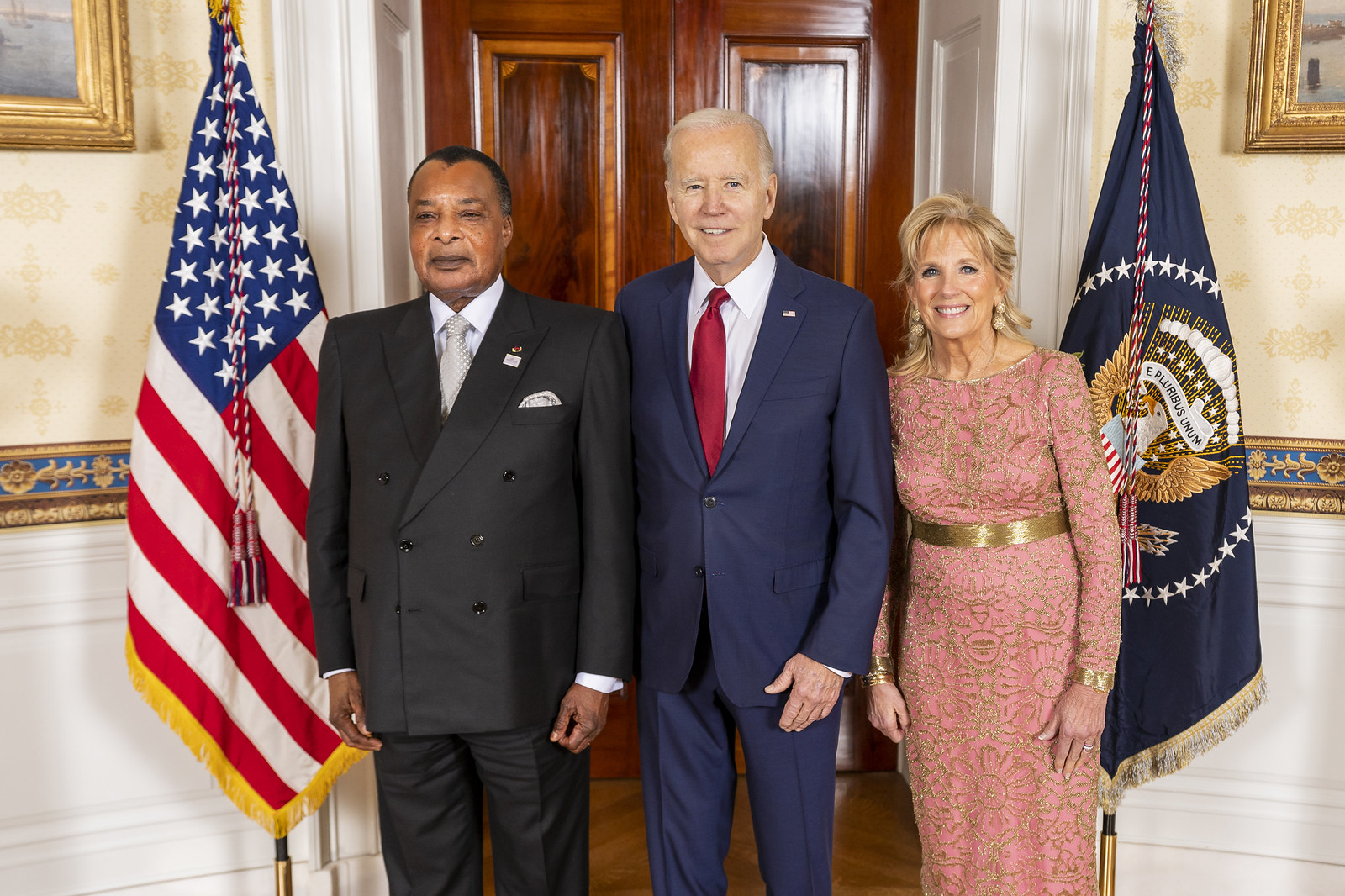
Sassou Nguesso with U.S. President Joe Biden and Jill Biden in December 2022

During the presidential election that took place on 21 March 2021, Sassou Nguessou, who faced six challengers for the presidency, came first once again, garnering 88.4% of the votes. His main challenger, Guy Brice Parfait Kolélas, finished second with 7.96%, Mathias Dzon received 1.92%, and the other four candidates each received less than 1% each. Irregularities, such as telecommunications being cut off during election day at a national level for the second election in a row, were reported by monitors.

In December 2022, he attended the United States–Africa Leaders Summit 2022 in Washington, D.C. and met with US President Joe Biden.

In July 2023, he attended the 2023 Russia–Africa Summit in Saint Petersburg and met with Russian President Vladimir Putin. During the summit, Nguesso called for peace in Ukraine. Sassou Nguesso visited Russia five times during his presidency. The last meeting took place on June 27, 2024, in Moscow.

=== 2026: Fifth term ===
Sassou Nguesso with Russian President Vladimir Putin at the Russia–Africa Summit in Moscow on 28 October 2026

Sassou Nguessou was elected to a fifth term in the 2026 Republic of the Congo presidential election on 15 March, having won 94.82% of the vote.

== African Union and the Libyan crisis ==
As the Chairman of the African Union High Level Committee on Libya, Sassou Nguesso stated on 20 June 2021 that the settlement of the Libyan crisis "appears, more than ever, as an absolute urgency", especially because of the possible negative impact of terrorist groups in the south of Libya on neighboring states. He declared "this crisis remains, before any other consideration, an African problem."

== Controversies ==
In September 2005, Sassou Nguesso and his entourage of more than fifty people stayed eight days at the Waldorf Astoria in Manhattan, New York, for Sassou Nguesso to deliver a fifteen-minute speech to the United Nations General Assembly. The Sunday Times reported that the trip cost a total of US$295,000, with thousands of dollars spent on room service alone. Sassou Nguesso was criticized by the Republic of Congo's creditors, as he was in negotiations with the World Bank and the UN International Monetary Fund to cancel Congolese debts, claiming inability to repay them.

In July 2007, British NGO Global Witness published documents showing that the President's son, Denis-Christel Sassou Nguesso, may have spent hundreds of thousands of dollars from the country's oil sales on shopping sprees in Paris and Dubai. The documents show that in August 2006, Denis Christel, who was the head of Cotrade – the marketing branch of Congo's state oil firm SNPC – spent $35,000 on purchases from designers such as Louis Vuitton and Roberto Cavalli.

On 30 November 2020, Sassou Nguesso and four ministers issued a decree terminating a contract with Australian mining company Sundance Resources to develop the Mbalam-Nabeba iron-ore deposit. Permits for the areas Avima, Nabeba and Bandodo were instead awarded to Sangha Mining Development, a subsidiary of Best Way Finance, a Hong Kong Corporation.

Sassou Nguesso has supported corruption and embezzlement of Congo's wealth. The Pandora Papers revealed that he controlled diamond mines which were some of the most valuable assets in the country.

== Honours ==
=== National ===
- Grand Cross of the Order of Merit

=== Foreign honours ===
- Angola:
  - Recipient of the Order of Agostinho Neto (1992)
- Benin:
  - Grand Cross of the National Order of Benin (2011)
- Ivory Coast:
  - Grand Cross of the National Order of the Ivory Coast (2023)
- Portugal:
  - Grand Collar of the Order of Prince Henry (1984)
- Russia:
  - Order of Honour (2024)
- Senegal:
  - Grand Cross of the National Order of the Lion (2022)
- Togo:
  - Grand Cross of the Order of Mono (2011)

== See also ==
- List of current heads of state and government
- List of heads of the executive by approval rating
- List of presidents of the Republic of the Congo
- Robert Bourgi
- Lists of political office-holders in Congo

== Notes ==
Political offices
Preceded by Jean-Pierre Thystère Tchicaya; Acting	President of the Congo-Brazzaville; 1979–1992	Succeeded by Pascal Lissouba
Preceded by Pascal Lissouba	President of the Congo-Brazzaville; 1997–present	Incumbent
Diplomatic posts
Preceded by Abdou Diouf	Chairperson of the Organisation of African Unity; 1986–1987	Succeeded by Kenneth Kaunda
Preceded by Olusegun Obasanjo	Chairperson of the African Union; 2006–2007	Succeeded by John Kufuor
