= Succès Masra =

Prime Minister of Chad in 2024

- سوكسيه ماسرا
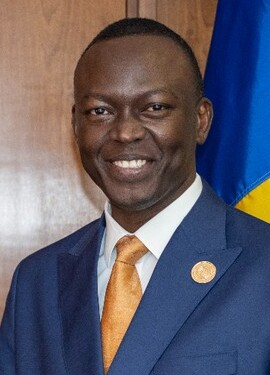
- Masra in 2024

Prime Minister of Chad
- In office 1 January 2024 – 22 May 2024
- President: Mahamat Déby
- Preceded by: Saleh Kebzabo
- Succeeded by: Allamaye Halina

Leader of Les Transformateurs
- Incumbent
- Assumed office 29 April 2018

Personal details
- Born: 30 August 1983 (age 43) Beboni, Logone-Oriental, Chad
- Party: Les Transformateurs

Succès Masra (Note: Arabic: سوكسيه ماسرا) (born 30 August 1983) is a Chadian economist and politician who served as the Prime Minister of Chad from 1 January to 22 May 2024. Having formerly worked for the African Development Bank, in 2018 he founded Les Transformateurs, a political party that became part of the opposition against former president Idriss Déby, and following Déby's death in 2021, the Transitional Military Council.

Masra lived in exile in the United States between 2022 and 2023, after the 2022 Chadian protests. In 2023, Masra stated his intention to return ahead of the 2023 constitutional referendum. On 1 January 2024, after his return, Succès Masra was appointed Prime Minister of Chad.

Masra has been under arrest since 16 May 2025.

== Early life and career ==
Masra was born in Chad on 30 August 1983, and was educated in Chad, Cameroon and France. After studying economics, Masra started working for the African Development Bank, where he worked as an economist prior to resigning in 2018 to start his political career.

== Political career ==
On 29 April 2018, Masra founded Les Transformateurs (meaning "The Transformers"; Arabic: المحوِّلون), a political party and opposition movement. Masra stated his intention to bring together Chadians "from the outside as well as from the inside" and to turn the country into a functioning social democracy. Masra was a noted critic of Idriss Déby, who had served as president since 1990, and whose regime had been described as authoritarian and corrupt by some international media sources.

=== 2021 presidential election ===
In November 2020, Déby announced he would stand as a candidate in the 2021 presidential election, running for his sixth consecutive term. Masra publicly objected to Déby's candidacy, citing the Chadian constitution of 2018, which stated that presidential terms would last for six years and would be renewable only once. Masra subsequently made his own application to run as a candidate; his application was rejected by the Independent National Electoral Commission, who stated that Les Transformateurs was not an officially registered political party. Following this, Masra took part in protests with which were violently suppressed by Chadian forces, leading to Masra seeking refuge in the United States' embassy in N'Djamena for six days due to fears for his safety.

On 16 March 2021, Masra met with Déby, and called on him to postpone the election to organise an inclusive national dialogue between Déby; his party, the Patriotic Salvation Movement; and opposition parties and organisations. Déby declined the postponement, and went on to win the election with 79.32% of the vote; Le Monde described the election as being "illegitimate" due to widespread irregularities.

=== Death of Déby and establishment of the Transitional Military Council ===
On 20 April 2021, Déby's death was publicly announced, with an army spokesperson stating that he had died of gunshot-related injuries while commanding the Chad National Army against Front for Change and Concord in Chad rebels near Nokou, as part of the Northern Chad offensive. That same day, the government and constitution of Chad were dissolved, and a Transitional Military Council (CMT), a military junta led by Déby's son, Mahamat, was announced. Masra called the dissolution of the government a "coup d'état", and called for an end of the Déby regime and associated cronyism, and for a turn towards democracy.

In May 2022, protests took place in N'Djamena against the presence of French troops in the country; France, a former coloniser of Chad, was accused of propping up the CMT junta. Les Transformeurs, alongside the civil society group Wakit Tamma, backed the protests, which were suppressed by the government, leading to the deaths of at least twelve people.

=== September 2022 protests ===
After the CMT announced its intention to enter into dialogue with opposition groups, Masra and Les Transformateurs, alongside Wakit Tama, established a set of preconditions that would need to be agreed before any dialogue took place. These included guarantees that a referendum would be held on any new constitution; that members of the military would not run in the next presidential election; and that there would be a clear separation of the government and the military. By August 2022, Les Transformeurs and Wakit Tama had announced that they would not partake in dialogue planned for the following month; Masra stated that he believed that the preconditions could be too easily annulled by the CMT.

On 1 September 2022, Masra organised demonstrations in N'Djamena to protest the commencement of dialogue between the CMT and opposition groups. 91 activists were subsequently arrested for "disturbing public order" and non-compliance with laws around demonstrations on public roads; many activists fled to Les Transformeurs' headquarters, which were subsequently blockaded by the police. Further demonstrations against the blockade of Les Transformateurs led to the arrests of at least 200 more activists, which triggered the Catholic Church in Chad to withdraw from the dialogue with the CMT, with several other organisations threatening to drop out should the blockade not be lifted. The activists were released after several days following the intervention of the Burkinabé diplomat Djibril Bassolé.

=== September 2022 court summons ===
In a speech during the protests, Masra told Chadians to "expect the worst"; he was subsequently summoned to appear in court in response to his statement. On his journey to the court, he was accompanied by over a thousand activists, who were dispersed by the police; an estimated 300 activists were arrested, with around 1000 injured. The CMT's actions were criticised by the International Federation for Human Rights, the African Union and European Union, the governments of the United States, Germany and France, and Idriss Déby's party, the Patriotic Salvation Movement. In response to the international outcry, Masra's court summons was cancelled.

=== October 2022 protests and exile ===
In October 2022, protests broke out within Chad after Déby publicly announced his intention to extend his rule by a further two years, reconstituting the CMT as the National Transitional Council (CNT), rather than transferring power to a civilian government as he had originally promised. The government's violent response to the protests led to the deaths of at least 50 protestors; Masra put the figure at least 70, with over a thousand tortured or injured. Following the protests, Masra went into hiding and subsequently fled to Cameroon before settling in the United States. In his absence, Les Transformateurs' registration was suspended by the CNT, before it was reinstated in January 2023.

=== Return to Chad ===
On 11 August 2023, Masra announced his intention to return to Chad by 18 October 2023, ahead of the 2023 constitutional referendum. Subsequent posts on social media revealed that the N'Djamena Court of Appeal had issued a previously unknown international arrest warrant against Masra in June 2023, accusing him of "inciting hatred and revolt" and attempting to "undermine constitutional order". Human Rights Watch stated Chad's transitional government threatening an exiled opposition leader with arrest demonstrated that "fundamental freedoms are still very much at risk" in the country ahead of the referendum.

On 16 October 2023, Masra announced he was delaying his return to Chad, stating "increasing threats" from the transitional council. On 31 October 2023, Masra and the Chadian government signed an agreement brokered by the Economic Community of Central African States permitting Masra to return to Chad after an amnesty was granted to him and other protesters. Some members of the opposition criticised Masra for signing the agreement, accusing him of absolving the government of their accountability concerning their response to the protests. On 1 January 2024, Succès Masra was appointed Prime Minister of Chad.

=== 2024 presidential election ===
On 3 March 2024, Masra announced his candidacy for the presidential election of 6 May 2024. He ran as the head of the Les Transformateurs party. His candidacy was approved by the Constitutional Court. On 10 March 2024, he announced that he had accepted his party's nomination of him as its candidate for the presidential election. It was the first time in Chad's history that a president and a prime minister faced each other in a presidential election.

On 9 May, transitional president Mahamat Déby was declared the winner of the 2024 election by the National Elections Management Agency (ANGE). According to ANGE, Déby won 61.3% of the vote while Masra, won 18.53%. Just prior to the announcement, Masra claimed victory on Facebook, claiming he won a "resounding victory." The results of the election were announced two weeks earlier than expected.

On 22 May, Masra submitted his resignation as prime minister as well as that of the transitional government.

== Arrest ==
On the early morning of 16 May 2025, Masra was taken from his residence by armed individuals. Prosecutors later confirmed that he had been arrested on charges of inciting hatred following clashes in Logone Occidental Region on 14 May that left 42 people dead. On 21 May, he was charged by the courts and placed in detention. On 23 June, Masra announced that he was starting a hunger strike to protest his detention. He ended his hunger strike on 30 June. He was convicted over the charges on 9 August 2025 and sentenced to 20 years' imprisonment and a fine of 1 billion CFA francs.

== See also ==
- List of state leaders by age § Youngest serving state leaders

== Notes ==
Political offices
Preceded by Saleh Kebzabo	Prime Minister of Chad; 2024	Succeeded by Allamaye Halina
