= Ndolenodji Alixe Naïmbaye =

Chadian politician

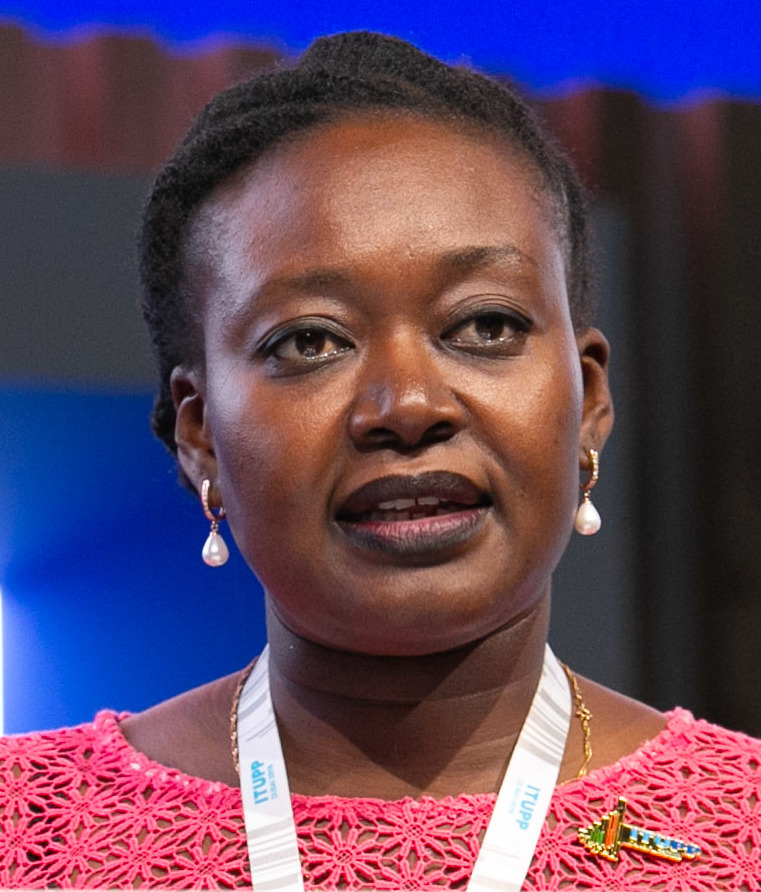

Minister of Petroleum, Mines and Geology
- Incumbent
- Assumed office 27 May 2024
- President: Mahamat Idriss Déby
- Prime Minister: Allamaye Halina

Minister of Hydrocarbons and Energy
- In office 27 October 2023 – 23 May 2024
- President: Mahamat Idriss Déby
- Prime Minister: Saleh Kebzabo; Succès Masra
- Preceded by: Djerassem Le Bemadjiel
- Succeeded by: Patalet Kanabe Marcelin

Minister of Land Affairs, Housing Development and Urban Planning for the Transitional Military Council
- In office 9 July 2022 – 2022
- President: Mahamat Idriss Déby
- Prime Minister: Allamaye Halina

Personal details
- Party: Action for the Republic, Development and Democracy (ARD) party
- Parent: Mbaïlaou Naïmbaye Lossimian (father)
- Education: Polytechnic University of Hauts-de-France; Cergy-Pontoise University

Ndolenodji Alixe Naïmbaye is a Chadian politician. She is national president of the Action for the Republic, Development and Democracy (ARD) party and Minister of Petroleum, Mines and Geology in the Government of Chad. She has previously served as Minister of Hydrocarbons and Energy; Minister of Land Affairs, Housing Development and Urban Planning; Secretary of State for Finance and Budget and as Minister of Post, ICT and Telecommunications.

== Biography ==
Naïmbaye was born in Chad and is the daughter of former minister Mbaïlaou Naïmbaye Lossimian [fr]. She studied at the Polytechnic University of Hauts-de-France and Cergy-Pontoise University, both in France. She is trilingual.

Before entering politics, Naïmbaye worked as Director General of the Chamber of Commerce, Industry, Agriculture, Mines and Crafts (CCIAMA) of Chad. She was also National Secretary for Communication of the Association of Women Business Leaders and Traders and the Founding President of the Association for the Promotion of Commercial Information and Communication in Chad (APIC).

On 18 June 2018, Naïmbaye was appointed as Minister of Posts, New Technologies, Information and Communications. She was replaced in January 2019 by interim minister Oumar Yaya Hissein, following a "conflict of interest". It was speculated in the Africa Yearbook that she was dismissed due to firing individuals from the Ministry who were related to Hinda Déby Itno, then First Lady of Chad. She returned to the government in 2020 as Secretary of State for Finance and Budget.

On 12 October 2020, Naïmbaye was elected as national president of the Action for the Republic, Development and Democracy (ARD) political party. Her election was unsuccessfully contested by Abdoulaye Mbodou Mbami.

In the Transitional Military Council, which ruled Chad from 2021 to 2022 following the death of President Idriss Déby, Naïmbaye served as Minister of Land Affairs, Housing Development and Urban Planning from 9 July 2022. She was succeeded by Mahamat Assileck Halata [fr].

In 2023, Naïmbaye was appointed Chair of the Board of Directors of the National Agency for Information and Communication Technologies (ADETIC).

On 27 October 2023, Naïmbaye was appointed as Minister of Hydrocarbons and Energy by President Mahamat Idriss Déby, succeeding Djerassem Le Bemadjiel [fr]. Naïmbaye officially took office on 30 October 2023. While Naïmbaye was in post, Chad hosted the Central Africa Business Energy Forum (CABEF) in November 2023. Naïmbaye visited Beijing, China, to strengthen bilateral relations between Chad and China, visited Niger to discuss laying oil pipelines between Niger, Chad and Cameroon, and conducted a field visit to the oil and gas facilities of the Perenco company in Douala, Cameroon.

On 27 May 2024, Naïmbaye was appointed as Minister of Petroleum, Mines and Geology. In May 2025, she led a high-level delegation to Dubai, United Arab Emirates. In March 2025, she announced the resumption of activities at the Belanga oil site. In July 2025, she met with Burkinabe Minister of Energy, Mines and Quarries Yacouba Zabré Gouba and signed a memorandum of understanding (MoU) "to enhance cooperation in the fields of mining and geology" between the nations. In October 2025, she announced a crackdown on illegal mining activities in the northern Chad. In November 2025, she held talks with Morocco’s Minister of Energy Transition and Sustainable Development Leila Benali, and participated in the Combined General Assembly of the Cameroon Oil Transportation Company (COTCO).
