= 2024 Chadian presidential election =

Election of Mahamat Déby

- 6 May 2024
- Turnout: 75.78%
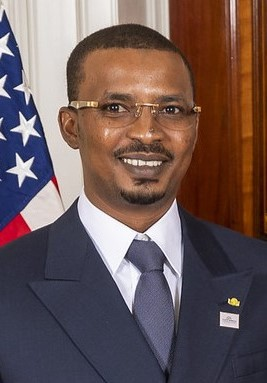

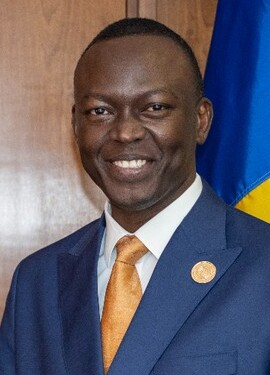

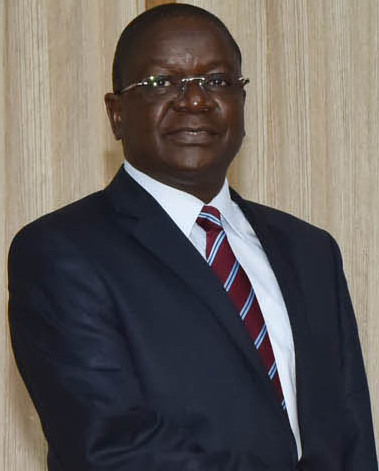
| Nominee | Mahamat Déby | Succès Masra | Albert Pahimi Padacké |
| Party | MPS | Transformateurs | RNDT–Le Réveil |
| Popular vote | 3,777,279 | 1,148,245 | 1,048,015 |
| Percentage | 61.00% | 18.54% | 16.93% |
President before election
Mahamat Déby (transitional)
Military
Elected President
Mahamat Déby
MPS

Presidential elections were held in Chad on 6 May 2024. The elections followed a constitutional referendum held on 17 December 2023, following the death of President Idriss Déby in 2021. Incumbent transitional president Mahamat Déby, the son of Idriss Déby, ran as the candidate of the Patriotic Salvation Movement, winning the election and leading to another extension of 34 years of rule by the Déby family.

== Background ==
In October 2022, incumbent President Mahamat Déby extended the transition period for another two years. Despite previously declaring that he was not intending to succeed his father, this time he also declared that he was eligible for election for a full term. Chad's security forces gunned down at least 128 protesting people in a day and arrested hundreds more.

Following the announcement of the election date on 28 February 2024, clashes broke out in the capital N'Djamena after the government said that supporters of the opposition Socialist Party without Borders (PSF) attacked the headquarters of the National State Security Agency (ANSE), and attempted to assassinate the head of the Supreme Court, Samir Adam Annour. Government forces subsequently laid siege to PSF headquarters, resulting in several deaths, including that of PSF leader Yaya Dillo Djérou, Déby's cousin who had announced his intention to run for president and was regarded as his main opponent, in what authorities said was a shootout. The attacks were condemned by the African Union, while French Minister for Europe and Foreign Affairs Jean-Yves Le Drian called for an impartial investigation into the incident.

On 12 April 2024, the United Chad party filed a complaint against the United Chad coalition of Mahamat Déby, accusing it of plagiarism.

== Electoral system ==
The President of Chad is elected for a five-year term using a two-round system, with an absolute majority required in the first round to prevent a second round of voting.

== Candidates ==
The Chadian electoral commission announced that it would release the official list of candidates approved by the Constitutional Council on 24 March 2024.

=== Nominated candidates ===
| Candidate's name, age, political party | Experience | Campaign | Details |
|---|---|---|---|
| Mahamat Déby (39); Patriotic Salvation Movement | Incumbent Transitional President of Chad (2022–present); President of the Transitional Military Council (2021–2022) | | In 2021, Déby initially promised he would not stand in the poll to succeed his father. On 13 January 2024, he was announced as the nominee of the Patriotic Salvation Movement by party secretary Mahamat Zene Bada. He confirmed his candidacy on 2 March as a candidate of the wider For a United Chad coalition. |

==== Les Transformateurs ====
- Succès Masra, incumbent Prime Minister of Chad (2024–present). His candidacy was approved by the Constitutional Court. On 10 March 2024, that he had accepted his party's nomination of him as its candidate for the presidential election. After being pursued by the junta with an international arrest warrant, he returned to Chad in November 2023 after signing an agreement with the government. It was the first time in Chad's history that a president and a prime minister faced each other in a presidential election.

==== Other candidates ====
The candidacies of eight other candidates were approved namely:

- Albert Pahimi Padacké, former Prime Minister of Chad (National Rally of Chadian Democrats)
- Alladoum Djarma Baltazar (Action for Renewal of Chad)
- Théophile Bongoro Bebzouné, member of the National Transitional Council (Rally for Democracy and Progress)
- Lydie Beassemda, Minister of Education (Party for Integral Democracy and Independence)
- Mansiri Lopsikréo, engineer (Les Élites)
- Brice Mbaimon Guedmbaye (Movement of Chadian Patriots)
- Yacine Abdramane Sakine, banker (Reformist Party)
- Nasra Djimasngar, academic (New Day Party)

=== Killed candidates ===
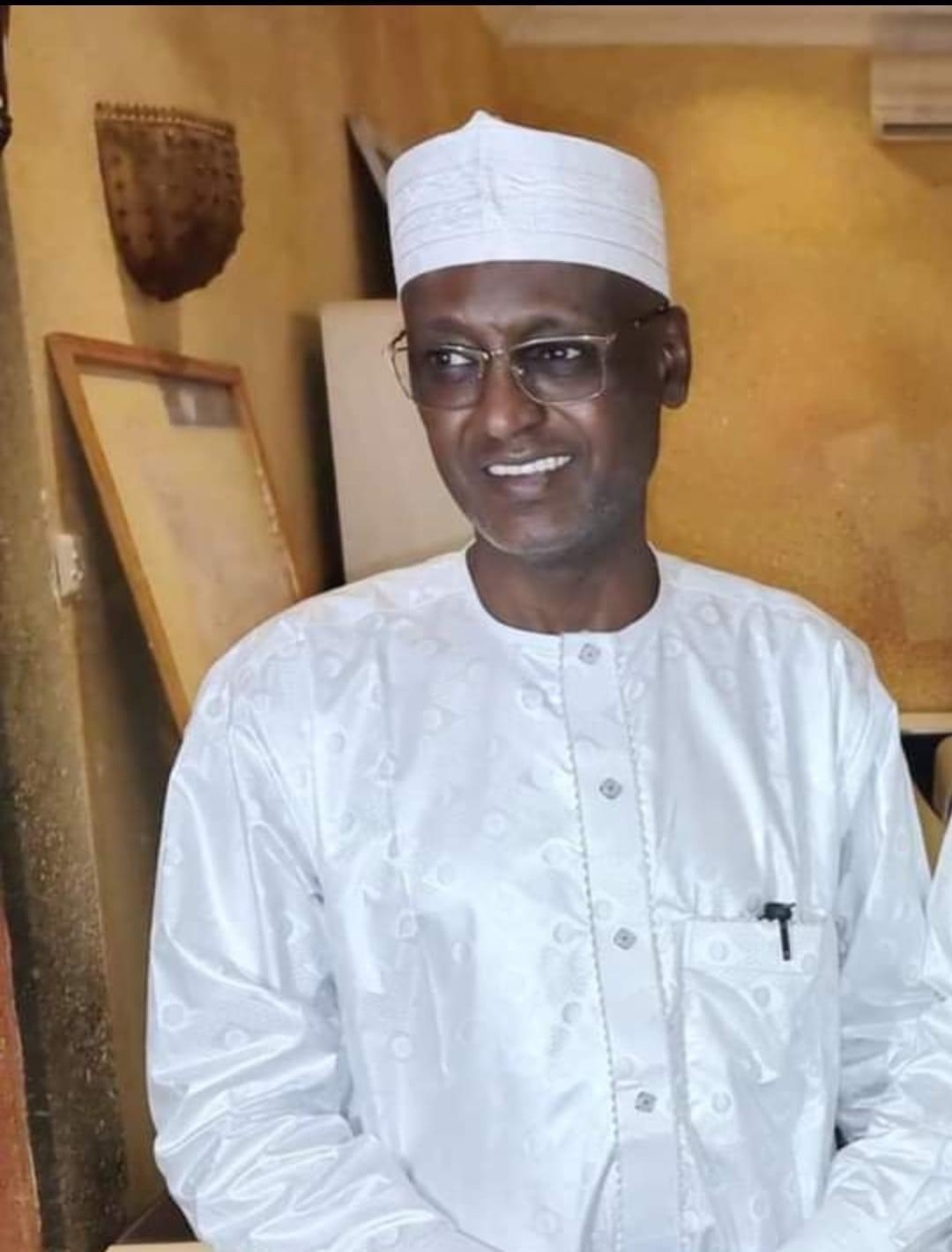
Yaya Djérou

==== Socialist Party Without Borders ====
- Yaya Dillo Djérou, killed by government forces shortly after the vote date announcement.

=== Rejected candidates ===
- Nassour Ibrahim Neguy Koursami, rejected because of "irregularities" in application. He was also accused of forgery in his papers.
- Rakhis Ahmat Saleh, rejected because of "irregularities" in application.

The candidacies of ten candidates in total were rejected.

== Opinion polls ==
In a poll of 1,000 people residing in the 10 districts of N'Djamena conducted by the Center for Development Studies and the Prevention of Extremism, 487 of the respondents (50.94%) said they did not believe in the credibility of Chad's electoral authorities (the National Election Management Agency (ANGE) and the Constitutional Council) because they are under the control of supporters of Mahamat Déby. Speaking of credible candidates for the presidential election, 261 (79.09%) of the 330 who did not abstain listed Succès Masra as credible, 46 (13.94%) listed Mahamat Déby, and 23 (6.97%) listed other candidates.

Furthermore, only 45% of the respondents thought that the next presidential election could guarantee peace, security, and social coalition. Indicators of a likely post-election crisis focus on electoral fraud, lack of equality between candidates, and secondarily, possible violence. And when asked which indicators could lead to a post-election crisis, 47.8% thought that fraud would be the main indicator, 40.89% attribute it to the lack of equality between candidates, and 19.4% mentioned violence. Finally, the majority of those questioned (53.87%) thought that Chad is not yet on the right track path to democracy.

== Campaign ==
On 15 March, the period for submitting applications ended, around fifteen candidates submitted their applications to the Constitutional Council.

On 16 March, the "We the People" coalition demanded the postponement of the presidential election and the opening of an inclusive national dialogue. On 23 March, the opposition platform Wakit Tamma called for a boycott of the presidential election, criticizing a "masquerade" whose results were known in advance. On 13 April, bishops of Chad called on political parties to ensure the smooth running of the presidential election.

The Chadian National Election Management Authority (ANGE) issued a prohibition on taking photographs and videos of the results, as well as their publication on social media or any other radio or television platform, saying that opposition parties could upload manipulated results to incite violence.

As part of his campaign, Succès Masra unveiled what he called a "minimum package of dignity", which includes a five-year plan to generate 200,000 jobs, divided equally between the private and public sectors.

== Conduct ==
Early voting was conducted for members of the Chad National Army and nomads on 5 May. On election day, polls opened at 07:00 and closed at 17:00. Some 8.5 million people are eligible to cast their vote. Provisional results were released by 21 May, with final results on 5 June. Several civil society groups said that authorities rejected many of the 2,900 applications sent in by would-be observers. Several violent incidents during voting were reported by local journalists, leading to the deaths of at least two people in Abéché and Moundou, where a soldier was fatally stabbed by angry residents after he was reportedly caught stuffing ballot boxes in favor of Déby.

Following the election, Succès Masra and his Les Transformateurs party said that he and his supporters had been subjected to threats, violence and arbitrary arrests, adding that has his residence had been placed under surveillance. Masra also accused the National Elections Management Agency of rigging the vote in favor of Mahamat Déby and urged voters to defend what he called their will expressed at the ballot box against massive electoral fraud. The Coalition of Moral Authorities for Mediation (CONAMM), an association that includes traditional rulers, clerics, former government ministers and youth and women leaders, also complained of massive fraud and intimidation during the election, including ballot-stuffing and ballot-snatching by government officials. The International Federation for Human Rights said that the election appeared "neither credible, free nor democratic", while the International Crisis Group also said that "a number of problems in the run-up to the balloting cast doubt on its credibility".

== Results ==
On 9 May, just before the release of provisional results, Masra claimed victory in a live broadcast on Facebook, calling on his supporters and security forces to oppose what he saw as an attempt to steal the election. Provisional results were released later that day, indicating a decisive victory for Déby, who garnered 61.3% of the vote, surpassing the required threshold of 50% to avoid a runoff. Masra only secured 18.53% of the vote. The results were announced two weeks earlier than scheduled. Former prime minister and third place finisher, Albert Pahimi Padacké, congratulated Déby on his victory. Gunfire was reported in N'Djamena following the release of the results, while celebrations were held by Déby supporters outside the Presidential Palace. At least ten people were killed in unrest that followed the announcement.

On 12 May Masra formally appealed to the Constitutional Council to have the election annulled, saying that Les Transformateurs had amassed evidence of electoral fraud. Prior to this, several of his supporters had been arrested on charges of forgery and using false documents to obtain access to vote counts. On 16 May, Déby's victory was confirmed by the Constitutional Council, which also rejected Masra's arguments.

| Candidate | Party | Votes | % |
|---|---|---|---|
| Mahamat Déby | Patriotic Salvation Movement | 3,777,279 | 61.00 |
| Succès Masra | Les Transformateurs | 1,148,245 | 18.54 |
| Albert Pahimi Padacké | National Rally for Democracy in Chad | 1,048,015 | 16.93 |
| Lydie Beassemda | Party for Integral Democracy and Independence | 59,632 | 0.96 |
| Théophile Bongoro | Party for Rally and Equity in Chad | 46,784 | 0.76 |
| Alladoum Djarma | Chadian Socialist Action for Renewal | 33,765 | 0.55 |
| Brice Guedmbaye | Movement of Patriotic Chadians for the Republic | 27,848 | 0.45 |
| Yacine Abdramane Sakine | Reformist Party | 22,328 | 0.36 |
| Mansiri Lopsikréo | Les Élites | 15,147 | 0.24 |
| Nasra Djimasngar | A New Day | 12,738 | 0.21 |
| Total | | 6,191,781 | 100.00 |
| Valid votes | | 6,191,781 | 99.62 |
| Invalid/blank votes | | 23,463 | 0.38 |
| Total votes | | 6,215,244 | 100.00 |
| Registered voters/turnout | | 8,202,207 | 75.78 |
Source: Africa 24

== Aftermath ==
On 22 May, Succès Masra submitted his resignation as prime minister as well as that of the transitional government. On 23 May, Mahamat Déby was sworn in as the elected president.
