= General Directorate of the Security Services of State Institutions =

General Directorate of the Security Service of State Institutions
- Direction générale de service de sécurité des institutions de l'État

Agency overview
- Formed: Historic: 1967; Current form: 2005
- Jurisdiction: Government of Chad
- Headquarters: N'Djamena, Chad
- Employees: 5,400–7,000 (2024)

The General Directorate of the Security Service of State Institutions (French: Direction générale de service de sécurité des institutions de l'État, DGSSIE) is one of the intelligence agencies of the Republic of Chad and is tasked with presidential security, domestic military intelligence, and counterterrorism. The DGSSIE is estimated to consist of between 5,400 and 7,000 troops. It was founded in 2005 by President Idriss Déby to replace the former Republican Guard, though it had several historic predecessors during the rule of François Tombalbaye and Hissène Habré.

== History ==
=== Predecessors ===
The earliest predecessor of the agency was the Compagnies Tchadiennes de Securité (CTS), or Chadian Security Unit, a paramilitary force established by President François Tombalbaye in 1967. The CTS consisted of a mix of intelligence officers and soldiers from the Chadian Armed Forces, serving as a mobile unit and as a presidential security group. Some of its members were trained by Israel. During the 1970s the Centre de Coordination et d'Exploitation du Renseignement (CCER), or Center for Coordination and Exploitation of Intelligence, was created. It later included the Brigade Spéciale d'Intervention (BSI). The CCER was led by the French colonel Camille Gourvenec and its Special Intervention Brigade carried out arrests, torture, and assassinations of the president's political opponents. Gourvenec later betrayed Tombalbaye and had a role in the 1975 coup that led to the president's death. He was later an advisor to Tombalbaye's successor Félix Malloum.

Malloum's brief rule was marked by the dysfunction of most state institutions and lawlessness in northern Chad. He fled the country in 1979 amidst a civil war against rebel groups, and his successor Goukouni Oueddei was overthrown in 1982 by Hissène Habré. Habré created the Direction de la Documentation et de la Securité (DDS), or Directorate of Documentation and Security, which served as his secret police force. It also included a uniformed Brigade Spéciale d'Intervention Rapide (BSIR). The DDS oversaw of a mass surveillance police state that monitored the population for criticism of the Habré regime, while the BSIR was used to carry out arrests. In addition, several other intelligence organizations were created in other parts of the government, including the Internal Affairs Ministry (Sûreté Nationale) and the Office of the President (Service d'Investigation Présidentielle). The DDS received support from the United States Central Intelligence Agency during the Reagan administration, and from France and Israel.

One of the most common tasks for Chad's various intelligence agencies was to spy on soldiers in the country's military, which included integrated rebel groups and the former national army. A Presidential Guard was established as an independent part of the Chadian National Armed Forces that answered to Habré, with its troops being better paid and equipped than the regular military. In 1989 two generals, Idriss Déby and Hassan Djamous, attempted to overthrow Habré in a failed coup. Djamous was arrested and killed by the DDS, while Déby escaped to Sudan and became the founder of the Patriotic Salvation Movement to overthrow Habré. After Déby's successful invasion of Chad and removal of Habré in 1990, he established an agency to replace the DDS, which in 1993 became the modern-day Agence nationale de sécurité (National Security Agency, ANS). The Presidential Guard was later renamed the Republican Guard.

=== Modern ===
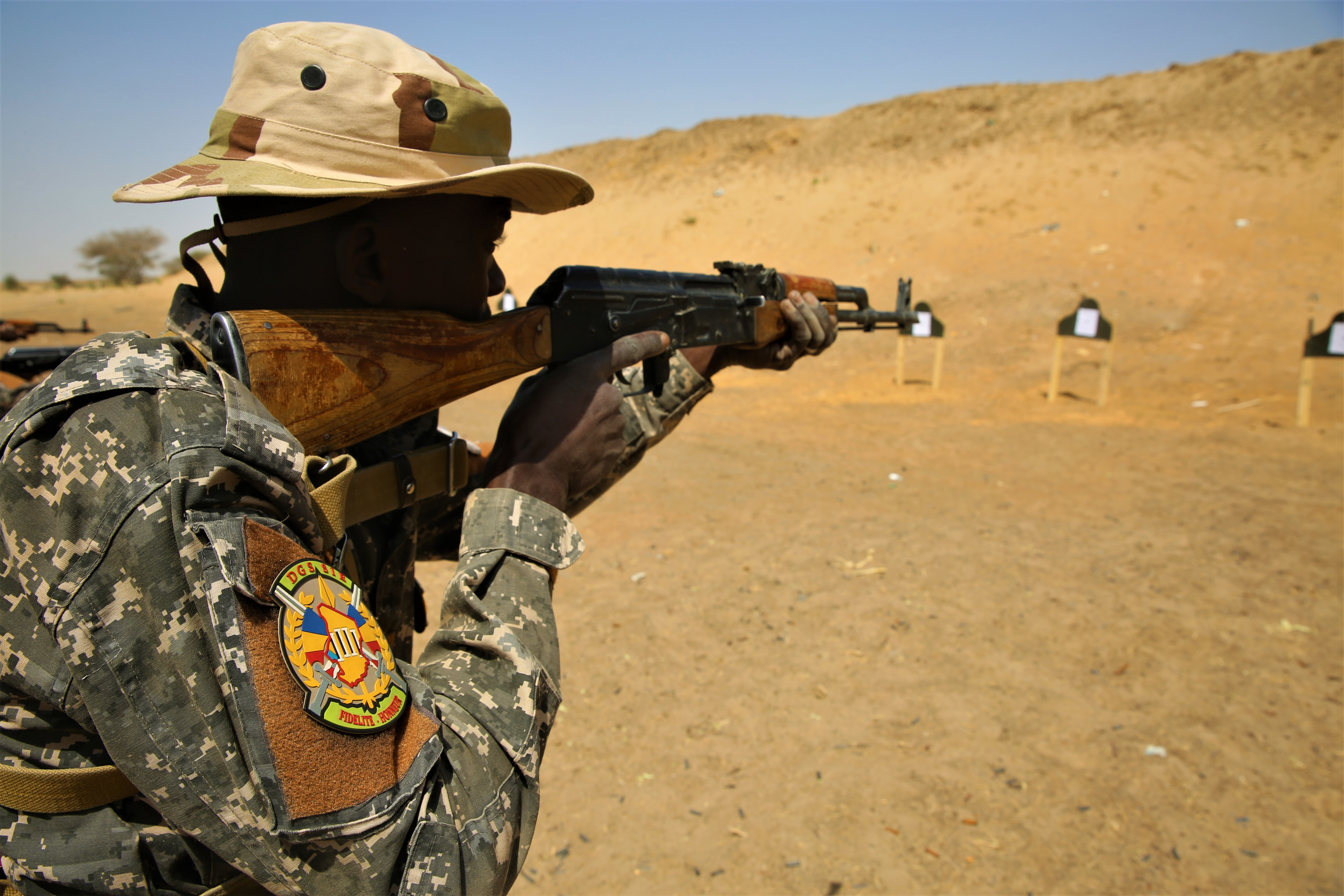
A soldier of the DGSSIE training at Flintlock 2017, an exercise held by the U.S. Africa Command

During the presidency of Idriss Déby, the Republican Guard and the ANS both were used to suppress political opposition to his government. However, members of the Republican Guard took part in a failed coup attempt in May 2004 and others defected during a mutiny in late 2005 that led to start of the Chadian Civil War. The DGSSIE was established by President Idriss Déby on 1 November 2005, after having dissolved the Republican Guard. The new agency, tasked with protecting the president of Chad, had 1,640 personnel.

The DGSSIE has been described as a "praetorian guard" and the domestic military intelligence of the Déby administration. It also controls special forces units, which is known as the Division of Special Anti-Terrorist Groups (DGSAT) or the Special Anti-Terrorist Group (SATG). Due to its importance, the DGSSIE receives a disproportionate amount of training and equipment compared to the Chad National Army.

The former president's son, Mahamat Idriss Déby, commanded an armored unit and was the head of security of the presidential palace before becoming the head of the entire agency in 2014. He commanded DGSSIE special forces units during Operation Serval alongside the French military.

The DGSSIE was estimated to have 5,400 military personnel in 2024 by the International Institute for Strategic Studies, while another estimated put the figure at 7,000.

== Similar agencies from countries located near Chad ==
- Egypt's National Security Agency
- Nigeria's State Security Service
- Morocco's General Directorate for Territorial Surveillance
- Kenya's National Intelligence Service
- Sudan's General Intelligence Service

== Sources ==
- Hansen, Ketil Fred (2023). "Chad: An Armed Intelligence Culture". In Shaffer, Ryan (ed.). The Handbook of African Intelligence Cultures. London: Rowman & Littlefield. ISBN 978-1-5381-5998-9.
