= List of heads of state of Chad =

President of the Republic of Chad
- رئيس جمهورية تشاد (Arabic); Président de la République du Tchad (French)
- Presidential standard of Chad

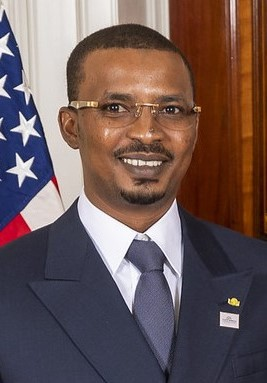
- Incumbent; Mahamat Déby since 20 April 2021 (Note: As de facto head of state until 10 October 2022, and as transitional president until 23 May 2024.)
- Style: Mr. President (informal); His Excellency (formal, diplomatic)
- Type: Executive president; Head of state; Commander-in-chief
- Residence: Presidential Palace, N'Djamena
- Term length: Five years, renewable once
- Constituting instrument: Constitution of Chad (2023)
- Inaugural holder: François Tombalbaye
- Formation: 23 April 1962; 64 years ago
- Deputy: President of the National Assembly
- Salary: FCFA 800,000 monthly
- Website: Presidency of Chad

The president of Chad (Arabic: رئيس جمهورية تشاد, romanized: rayiys jumhuriat tshad, French: Président de la République du Tchad) is the head of state of Chad, and the commander-in-chief of the Chadian National Army. The presidency is the highest executive position in the country. The president is directly elected for a double five-year term.

A total of seven people have served as head of state of Chad (not counting two Interim Heads of State). Additionally, one person, Goukouni Oueddei, has served on two non-consecutive occasions.

The current head of state is President Mahamat Déby, who was inaugurated on 23 May 2024 following the 2024 presidential election. Prior to that, Déby has served as transitional president from 2022, and Chad's de facto head of state as president of the Transitional Military Council from 2021, after his father, the previous president Idriss Déby, was killed in the Northern Chad offensive.

== Term limits ==
In 2018, the new Constitution of Chad reinstated two-term limits for the president. It also changed the length of the term from five years to six years. However, in 2023, a constitutional referendum was held which changed the length of the term from six years back to five years and which also lowered the minimum age for the presidency from 40 down to 35.

== Titles ==
- 1960–1962: Head of State
- 1962–1975: President of the Republic
- 1975 : Chairman of the Supreme Military Council
- 1975–1978: Head of State
- 1978–1979: President of the Republic
- 1979 : Chairman of the Provisional Council of State
- 1979 : President of the Transitional Government of National Unity
- 1979 : Chairman of the Provisional Administrative Committee
- 1979–1982: President of the Transitional Government of National Unity
- 1982 : Chairman of the Command Council of the Armed Forces of the North
- 1982 : Chairman of the Council of State
- 1982–1990: President of the Republic
- 1990 : President of the Patriotic Salvation Movement
- 1990–1991: President of the Council of State
- 1991–2021: President of the Republic
- 2021–2022: President of the Transitional Military Council
- 2022–2024: Transitional President of the Republic
- 2024–present: President of the Republic

== List of officeholders ==
Political parties

Chadian Progressive Party (PPT) → National Movement for the Cultural and Social Revolution (MNRCS)
National Liberation Front of Chad (FROLINAT)–People's Armed Forces (FAP)
Popular Movement for the Liberation of Chad (MPLT)
Armed Forces of the North (FAN) / National Union for Independence and Revolution (UNIR)
Patriotic Salvation Movement (MPS)

Other factions

Military (Chadian Armed Forces and Chadian National Army)

Status

Interim Head of State

Symbols

^{C} Constitutional referendum

No.	Portrait	Name (Birth–Death)	Elected	Term of office			Political party	Prime minister(s)
No.	Portrait	Name (Birth–Death)	Elected	Took office	Left office	Time in office	Political party	Prime minister(s)
1		François Tombalbaye (1918–1975) (Note: Changed name to N’Garta Tombalbaye on 30 August 1973 due to the policy of Africanization.)	1962; 1969	11 August 1960	13 April 1975 (Assassinated in a coup)	14 years, 245 days	PPT until 1973 renamed to MNRCS	Position not established
–		Noël Milarew Odingar (1932–2007)	—	13 April 1975	15 April 1975	2 days	Military	Position not established
2		Félix Malloum (1932–2009)	—	15 April 1975	23 March 1979 (Resigned)	3 years, 342 days	Military	Habré
–		Goukouni Oueddei (born 1944)	—	23 March 1979	29 April 1979	37 days	FROLINAT–FAP	Position vacant
3		Lol Mahamat Choua (1939–2019)	—	29 April 1979	3 September 1979	127 days	MPLT	Position vacant
4		Goukouni Oueddei (born 1944)	—	3 September 1979	7 June 1982 (Deposed in a coup)	2 years, 277 days	FROLINAT–FAP	Ngardoum (from 19 May 1982)
5		Hissène Habré (1942–2021)	1989^{[C]}	7 June 1982	2 December 1990 (Deposed in a coup)	8 years, 178 days	FAN / UNIR	Ngardoum (until 19 June 1982)
–		Idriss Déby (1952–2021)	—	2 December 1990 (Note: As transitional president.)	28 February 1991	88 days	Military / MPS	Position abolished
6		Idriss Déby (1952–2021)	1996; 2001; 2006; 2011; 2016; 2021	28 February 1991	20 April 2021 (Killed in action)	30 years, 51 days	Military / MPS	Bawoyeu; Yodoyman; Moungar; Koumakoye; Djimasta; Ouaido; Yamassoum; Kabadi; Faki; Yoadimnadji; Younousmi; Koumakoye; Abbas; Nadingar; Dadnadji; Deubet; Padacké
–		Mahamat Déby (born 1984)	—	20 April 2021	23 May 2024	3 years, 33 days	Military / MPS	Padacké; Kebzabo; Masra; Halina
7		Mahamat Déby (born 1984)	2024	23 May 2024	Incumbent	2 years, 107 days	Military / MPS	Padacké; Kebzabo; Masra; Halina

== Latest election ==
Candidate	Party	Votes	%
Mahamat Déby	Patriotic Salvation Movement	3,777,279	61.00
Succès Masra	Les Transformateurs	1,148,245	18.54
Albert Pahimi Padacké	National Rally for Democracy in Chad	1,048,015	16.93
Lydie Beassemda	Party for Integral Democracy and Independence	59,632	0.96
Théophile Bongoro	Party for Rally and Equity in Chad	46,784	0.76
Alladoum Djarma	Chadian Socialist Action for Renewal	33,765	0.55
Brice Guedmbaye	Movement of Patriotic Chadians for the Republic	27,848	0.45
Yacine Abdramane Sakine	Reformist Party	22,328	0.36
Mansiri Lopsikréo	Les Élites	15,147	0.24
Nasra Djimasngar	A New Day	12,738	0.21
Total		6,191,781	100.00
Valid votes		6,191,781	99.62
Invalid/blank votes		23,463	0.38
Total votes		6,215,244	100.00
Registered voters/turnout		8,202,207	75.78
Source: Africa 24

== See also ==
- Politics of Chad
- List of prime ministers of Chad
- Vice President of Chad
- History of Chad
- List of colonial governors of Chad
