= Dahabaya Oumar Souni =

Chadian journalist and media advisor

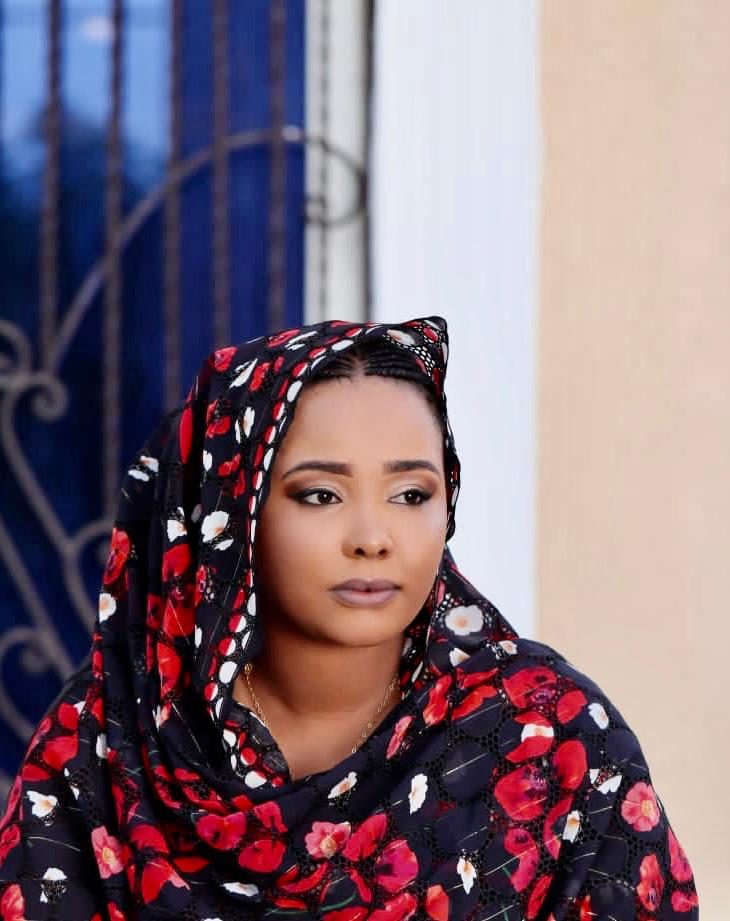

First Lady of Chad
- Incumbent
- Assumed office 21 April 2021
- President: Mahamat Déby
- Preceded by: Hinda Déby Itno

Personal details
- Born: 6 December 1992 (age 33) N'Djamena, Chad
- Spouse: Mahamat Déby
- Education: École supérieure des sciences et techniques de l'information et de communication de Yaoundé

Dahabaya Oumar Souni (born 6 December 1992) is a Chadian journalist and media advisor to the President of the Transitional Military Council of Chad. She is the third wife of Mahamat Déby, the President of Chad since the death of Idriss Déby on 19 April 2021, and the First Lady of Chad since 2021.

== Biography ==
=== Early life ===
Souni is the daughter of General Oumar Souni, who is originally from Mourtcha in the former Ennedi Ouest Department and a member of the Gaida clan of the Toubou people. He has held several senior positions in the Chad National Army under the regimes of both Idriss Déby and Hissène Habré. He was a Commander of the National and Nomadic Guard (GNNT) and Chief of Staff of the Army (CEMAT) under President Idriss Déby and Commander of the Special Rapid Intervention Brigade (BSIR) under Hissène Habré. Her mother, Ache Touka Haliki, is from Faya-Largeau, Chad, a member of the Toubou people's Anakhaza clan. Ache Touka Haliki is the daughter of General Touka Haliki Elehi, a senior official who served in the country since its independence in 1960.

Dahabaya Oumar Souni was born in N'Djamena. She is the sixth of many siblings. Originally from the north of the country, she is a member of the Toubou people and has diverse ancestry. Through her parents, she is of Toubou, Zaghawa, and Arab descent. Due to her father's military career, Souni spent her childhood in several cities across Chad, including Sarh, Bardaï and Faya.

=== Career and education ===
Dahabaya Oumar Souni graduated from École supérieure des sciences et techniques de l'information et de communication de Yaoundé in Cameroon with a degree in journalism in 2014. She has specialized in political communication and press relations. She began her career in January 2015 in the National Office of Broadcasting and Television (ORNTV). In September 2015, she joined the press team for the office of the President of Chad under her father-in-law, then-President Idriss Déby. In 2017, Souni was promoted to head of editorial department at the Directorate of Presidential Communication (DGCOM/PR). She became the Director of Public Relations and Audiovisual Archives in 2018, a position she held until May 2021. She closely collaborated with her father-in-law, Idriss Déby, until his death in April 2021.

In May 2021, Dahabaya Oumar Souni was appointed media advisor to the presidency of the Transitional Military Council and now works alongside her husband, Mahamat Déby.

Souni is the third of President Mahamat Déby's three wives and is considered the First Lady of Chad since 2021.
