= Battle of Kouri Bougoudi (2018) =

2018 battle between Chad and the CCMSR

- Part of Insurgency in Chad (2016–present)
Date	August 11, 2018
Location	Kouri Bougoudi, Tibesti Region, Chad
Result	CCMSR victory

Belligerents
Chad	CCMSR

Strength
Unknown	120 vehicles ~1200 fighters (per CCMSR)

Casualties and losses
73 killed, 45 captured (per CCMSR); 3+ killed (per AFP)	4 dead, 7 wounded (per CCMSR)

On August 11, 2018, rebels from the Military Command Council for the Salvation of the Republic (CCMSR) attacked Chadian forces at Kouri Bougoudi. The CCMSR claimed around 70 Chadian soldiers were killed. The battle was the first major action since the CCMSR and FACT rearmed in 2016.

== Background ==
Two new Chadian rebel groups, FACT and the CCMSR, were organized in southern Libya in 2016 and aided local groups in return for money, equipment, and other support. FACT initially became allied to a Misrata-based faction. By 2017, the Chadian intelligence believed that rebels led by Timane Erdimi, a nephew and long-time opponent of Idriss Déby, were gathering weapons in southern Libya.

In July 2017, the CCMSR launched an offensive on Kouri Bougoudi seeking to seize control of the region and its lucrative mines. These assaults were ultimately repelled by the Chadian government although the CCMSR claimed to have launched a second attack in August 2017 which the Chadian government denied took place. In September, Chad severed diplomatic relations with Qatar, accusing it of attempting to destabilize the country. Journalist Ben Taub suspected that this development was related to Qatar harboring Timane Erdimi who was still trying to overthrow Déby.

By fall, fighting between government loyalists and insurgents grew more frequent along the Chadian-Libyan border. Déby responded by relocating hundreds of Chadian soldiers who had been sent to fight against Boko Haram to the north.

== Battle ==
According to CCMSR spokesperson Kingabe Ogouzeimi, the CCMSR offensive was launched on August 8 from Libya, with 120 vehicles each carrying 10-15 fighters. The town of Kouri Bougoudi was attacked on August 11, with around 100 vehicles participating in the assault. The CCMSR claimed the attack, and also stated they captured the town. In the afternoon, the Chadian general staff claimed to have repelled the attack. The attack was the first attack by rebels confirmed by both sides on Chadian territory since the end of the Chadian Civil War in 2010.

The CCMSR stated that 73 Chadian soldiers were killed and 45 were taken prisoner, along with four rebels killed and seven wounded. In their statement, the CCMSR claimed to have captured a lieutenant-colonel, a major, and a captain. The group demanded the exchange of the prisoners for three CCMSR leaders held in N'Djamena. The Chadian government didn't release any casualty estimates, but AFP indicated that at least three security officials - a police officer, an intelligence officer, and a colonel - were killed in the attack.

== Aftermath ==
The Chadian government accused gold miners of complicity in the assault. Prospectors had been coming to Kouri Bougoudi since 2012 to search for gold, with many illegal gold mines being developed. In a press release on August 12, Minister of Territorial Administration Ahmat Mahamat Bachir gave gold miners near Kouri Bougoudi 24 hours to leave or face eviction by the army.

Jerome Tubiana, a researcher with the Small Arms Survey, stated that there is no evidence that the gold miners were complicit. Some miners were sympathetic to the Chadian government, and local Toubou populations were neutral in government-rebel conflicts. However, Alexandre Bish, a researcher at the Global Initiative Against Transnational Organized Crime, stated that many former rebels were among those who flocked to Kouri Bougoudi in the 2012-13 gold rush, and became gold panners or rebels depending on what was most convenient.

On August 16, the Chadian government launched an operation to evict gold miners from the area. That same day through August 17, the army bombed the region, injuring civilians. The CCMSR carried out smaller attacks against Kouri Bougoudi in September, with locals complaining that the group exploited ethnic tensions in the region.
