= List of international prime ministerial trips made by Abdul Hamid Dbeibeh =

Abdul Hamid Dbeibeh has made numerous public international trips to several countries as the Prime Minister of the Government of National Unity of Libya since taking office on 15 March 2021.

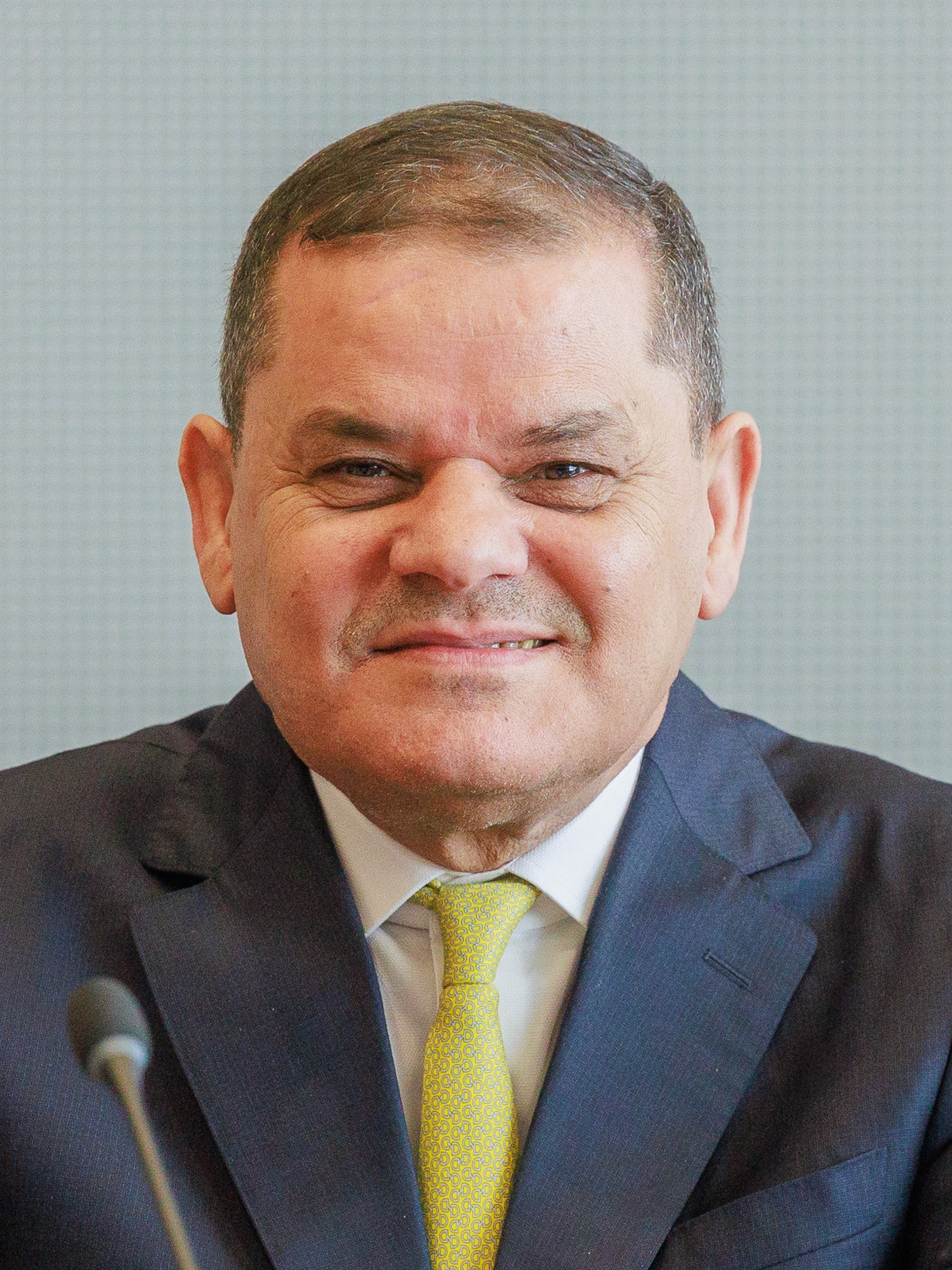
Abdul Hamid Dbeibeh in 2024

== Summary ==
The number of visits per country where Abdul Hamid Dbeibeh traveled are:

- One visit: China, Ethiopia, Jordan, Russia and Switzerland.
- Two visits: Chad, Egypt, Saudi Arabia, Tunisia and the United Arab Emirates.
- Four visits: Qatar.
- Five visits Italy.
- Nine visits: Turkey.

== 2021 ==
Country	Areas visited	Dates	Details
Turkey	Ankara	12–13 April	Met with President Recep Tayyip Erdoğan.
Russia	Moscow	15–17 April	Met with Prime Minister Mikhail Mishustin.
Turkey	Istanbul	7–8 August	Met with President Recep Tayyip Erdoğan.
Jordan	Amman	29–31 August	Met with King Abdullah II.
Tunisia	Tunis	9–10 September	Met with President Kais Saied.
Turkey	Istanbul	5–6 November	Met with President Recep Tayyip Erdoğan.

== 2022 ==
Country	Areas visited	Dates	Details
Chad	N'Djamena	25–27 January	Met with President Mahamat Déby and Prime Minister Albert Pahimi Padacké.
Tunisia	Tunis	30 November–1 December	Met with President Kais Saied.

== 2023 ==
Dbeibeh, Mohamed al-Menfi, Italian Prime Minister Giorgia Meloni and other leaders at the International Conference on Development and Migration in Rome, Italy – 23 July 2023

Country	Areas visited	Dates	Details
Turkey	Istanbul	18–19 February	Met with President Recep Tayyip Erdoğan.
Italy	Rome	7–9 June	Met with Prime Minister Giorgia Meloni.
Italy	Rome	23–25 July	Accompanied the Chairman of the Presidential Council Mohamed al-Menfi, met with Prime Minister Giorgia Meloni and attended the International Conference on Development and Migration.

== 2024 ==
Country	Areas visited	Dates	Details
Italy	Rome	27–29 January	Met with President Sergio Mattarella and Prime Minister Giorgia Meloni and attended the 2024 Italy–Africa Summit.
Saudi Arabia	Riyadh	3–4 February	Met with Defence Minister Khalid bin Salman Al Saud and attended the meeting of the Islamic Military Counter Terrorism Coalition.
Ethiopia	Addis Ababa	24–25 April	Met with Prime Minister Abiy Ahmed.
Chad	N'Djamena	22–24 May	Met with Prime Minister Allamaye Halina, attended the inauguration ceremony of President Mahamat Déby and held a bilateral meeting with Mauritanian President Mohamed Ould Ghazouani.
China	Beijing	30 May–2 June	Met with Premier Li Qiang and held a bilateral meeting with UAE President Mohamed bin Zayed Al Nahyan.

== 2025 ==
Country	Areas visited	Dates	Details
Turkey	Ankara	15–17 January	Met with President Recep Tayyip Erdoğan.
Switzerland	Zurich and Davos	20–24 January	Accompanied Mohamed al-Menfi, attended the 55th annual meeting of the World Economic Forum and held bilateral meetings with Iraqi President Abdul Latif Rashid and Saudi Foreign Minister Faisal bin Farhan Al Saud.
Qatar	Doha	25–27 February	Met with Sheikh Tamim bin Hamad Al Thani and Prime Minister Mohammed bin Abdulrahman bin Jassim Al Thani.
United Arab Emirates	Abu Dhabi	28–30 March	Met with Sheikh Mohamed bin Zayed Al Nahyan.
Turkey	Antalya	11–13 April	Met with President Recep Tayyip Erdoğan, attended the 4th Antalya Diplomacy Forum and held bilateral meetings with Egyptian Foreign Minister Badr Abdelatty, Russian Foreign Minister Sergey Lavrov, Sudanese President Abdel Fattah al-Burhan and Syrian President Ahmed al-Sharaa.
Turkey	Istanbul	1–2 August	Held a trilateral meeting with President Recep Tayyip Erdoğan and Italian Prime Minister Giorgia Meloni.

== 2026 ==
Country	Areas visited	Dates	Details
Italy	Milan	20–24 February	Underwent medical examinations.
Turkey	Antalya	16–18 April	Met with President Recep Tayyip Erdoğan, attended the 5th Antalya Diplomacy Forum and held bilateral meetings with Qatari Prime Minister Mohammed bin Abdulrahman bin Jassim Al Thani, Russian Foreign Minister Sergey Lavrov and Serbian Prime Minister Đuro Macut.
Italy	Rome	6–8 May	Met with Prime Minister Giorgia Meloni.
Saudi Arabia	Jeddah and Mecca	25–28 May	Performed Hajj.
United Arab Emirates	Abu Dhabi	2–4 July	Met with Sheikh Mohamed bin Zayed Al Nahyan.
Qatar	Doha	4–6 July	Met with Sheikh Tamim bin Hamad Al Thani and Prime Minister Mohammed bin Abdulrahman bin Jassim Al Thani.
Qatar	Doha	13–14 July	Met with Sheikh Tamim bin Hamad Al Thani and Prime Minister Mohammed bin Abdulrahman bin Jassim Al Thani and offered condolences on the death of former Emir Hamad bin Khalifa Al Thani.
Egypt	Cairo	30 July–1 August	Met with President Abdel Fattah el-Sisi and Prime Minister Mostafa Madbouly.
Turkey	Antalya	11–12 November	Met with President Recep Tayyip Erdoğan, attended the 31st United Nations Climate Change Conference and held bilateral meetings with Somali President Hassan Sheikh Mohamud, Syrian President Ahmed al-Sharaa and UN Secretary-General António Guterres.
Egypt	Cairo	18 November–Present	Met with President Abdel Fattah el-Sisi and Prime Minister Mostafa Madbouly.
