= 2022 Chadian protests =

- Date: October 20, 2022
- Location: N'Djamena, Moundou, Doba, Bebedjia, and Koumra, Chad
- Caused by: Failure of Mahamat Déby's government to transition to civilian rule; Failure to end conflict with FACT rebels
- Goals: Overthrow of Mahamat Déby and the end of the Transitional Military Council; Democratic elections
- Result: Chadian government victory: Several major opposition parties banned

Parties
Chadian government: Transitional Military Council; Patriotic Salvation Movement	Uncentralized leadership: Wakit Tamma; Les Transformateurs

Lead figures
Mahamat Déby; Saleh Kebzabo	(Uncentralized leadership): Succès Masra

Casualties and losses
15 killed (per Chadian government)	50+ killed (per Chadian government); 200+ killed (per Chadian opposition and NGOs)

Casualties
- Injuries: 300+ injured (per Chadian government); 1,000+ (per Chadian opposition)
- Arrested: 600+ arrested (per Chadian government and OMCT); 1,400 (per UN)

In October 2022, protests broke out across Chad after President Mahamat Déby declared his intentions to extend his rule by another two years instead of stepping down as promised following taking power as head of a military junta the prior year. The protests were some of the most violent in the country's history, with hundreds of protesters being killed and thousands detained, injured, or arrested.

== Background ==
Longtime Chadian president and military junta leader Idriss Déby was killed in 2021, after ruling since 1990. His son, Mahamat Déby, was installed as leader, and promised to rule for eighteen months before transitioning to a civilian-led administration.

In May 2022, protests broke out in the Chadian capital of N'Djamena against the presence of French troops in the country. These protests were backed by civil society group Wakit Tamma, who accused the Déby regime of being backed by France. The protesters viewed France as propping up the Déby regime, and the expulsion of French troops would subsequently lead to the fall of the Déby regime.

The protests in May failed, with six opposition leaders being jailed at a trial boycotted by defense lawyers, unions, and activists. Dialogue between Mahamat Déby and Front for Change and Concord in Chad (FACT), a coalition of anti-government rebel groups, initially had success in early 2022 but faltered by the summer, partially due to the crackdown on the protests. A "national dialogue" also was proposed by Mahamat Déby in August, but Human Rights Watch stated that much of the dialogue was supervised by security forces known for abuses of power.

== Protests ==
=== October 20 ===
Protests began at 3am on October 20, after organizers blew whistles across N'Djamena, as the date for Déby to transition to civilian rule (October 19), had passed. Initially, protesters and police clashed as police threw tear gas, but as the crowds grew, so did the violence. The protesters set fire to the headquarters of newly appointed Prime Minister Saleh Kebzabo's party NURD, partially burning it down, and much of N'Djamena was barricaded to confine the protests. Security forces in the Chagoua and Moursal neighborhoods of N'Djamena shot at young protesters in favor of the opposition. Protesters created their own barricades as well, burning tires and coating the city in black smoke.

Parts of the capital loyal to opposition groups had schools, universities, and markets close down due to the violence, and the streets were littered. Several prominent Chadians were killed in the first days of the protest, including Oredje Narcisse, a journalist for Chadian news site Tchadinfos, and Ray's Kim, a local popular musician. In an attack on the US embassy in N'Djamena, four people were killed by protesters. In response to the protests, the government banned opposition party Wakit Tamma, along with seven other opposition parties. Many protesters were tortured inside the Abena High School in the capital.

Succès Masra, the leader of the main opposition party Les Transformateurs ('The Transformers'), accused security forces of violence and claimed eight people were killed in the October 20 protests. Chadian government spokesman Aziz Mahamet Saleh claimed that thirty people were killed across the country in the protests, but organizers claimed the actual toll was closer to forty with many more wounded. In Moundou, Chad's second largest city, the local morgue claimed to have received thirty-two bodies, and an anonymous official claimed sixty people were injured. Saleh also stated that of those killed during the protests, ten were police forces. An Agence France-Presse journalist saw five bodies at the main hospital in N'Djamena, which the head doctor confirmed.

Kebzabo and the Chadian government assessed that the total death toll by the end of October 20 was fifty people killed and 300 injured. Les Transformateurs and Masra, however, claimed the death toll was 70 killed, and 1,000 wounded or tortured. On October 24, Chadian human rights organizations Ligue Tchadienne des Droits de l'Homme released a statement identifying 80 individual killed protesters. Kebzabo also stated the Chadian government will set up a Judicial Commission to investigate.

Protests took place primarily in N'Djamena, although protests in Moundou, Doba, Bébédjia, and Koumra took place.

=== Aftermath ===
The following day, Saleh Kebzabo declared a curfew in N'Djamena, Moundou, Doba, and Koumra from 6am to 6pm to quell the protests. That day, schools, traffic, and stores were all opened again, although the military patrolled many streets. Mahamat Déby visited hospitals with wounded protesters on October 22. Human rights organizations, meanwhile, claimed that 621 arrested protesters were taken to high security prisons like Koro Toro. The headquarters of Succès Masra were looted after the protests, and he himself fled to Cameroon. On November 28, the Chadian government began trials for 400 participants in the protests. 262 of the 401 people tried were sentenced between two and three years, 80 were given one-year jail terms or less, and 139 were released.

Several bodies were found in the Chari and Logone rivers after the protests. Survivors of the Koro Toro prison speaking to Human Rights Watch claimed that several protesters died along the way, but it is impossible to count how many died. In November 2023, Chad's parliament approved an amnesty law, ending prosecutions and convictions related to deaths linked to the 2022 anti-government protests.

== Reactions ==
=== Chadian officials ===
Prime Minister Saleh Kebzabo called the protests an "armed insurrection". He also personally ordered the ban on several opposition parties, claiming they had "led a rebellion in the south and killed people".

=== States and international organizations ===
African Union Commission Chair and former Chadian prime minister Faki Mahamat called for a peaceful solution to the protests.

The United Nations Human Rights Commissioner called on all sides to show restraint, and that they had received information about 500 arrested.

The French Foreign Ministry condemned "the use of lethal weapons against protesters." France also dispelled rumors they were involved in suppressing the protests.

The United States stated they were "deeply concerned" about reports of casualties. The US Embassy in Chad also posted a photo of the American ambassador kneeling next to blood-stained debris and shoes.

The European Union condemned the use of excessive force by the Chadian government.

=== Human rights organizations ===
Samira Daoud, Amnesty International's regional director for Central and West Africa, called for Chadian authorities "to immediately cease the excessive use of force against protesters."

The International Federation for Human Rights stated that the protests were violently suppressed, and they had documentation of torture, live gunfire, and arbitrary arrests.

Analysts from the International Crisis Group stated that the military junta was "holding onto power very tightly."

The World Organisation Against Torture accused the Chadian government of summary executions and torture.
