= Ray's Kim Edm =

Chadian rapper and musician (1989–2025)

- Born: Djasrabé Kimassoum Yilmian; 25 June 1989; N'Djamena, Chad
- Died: 6 October 2025 (aged 36)
- Occupations: Rapper, musician

Djasrabé Kimassoum Yilmian (25 June 1989 – 6 October 2025), better known by the stage name Ray's Kim Edm, was a Chadian rapper and musician.

== Life and career ==
Born in N'Djamena on 25 June 1989, Yilmian grew up in numerous locations due to his parents' work, including Gounou Gaya, Kélo, Biltine, and Bol. After his father's death in 1996, his family resided in N'Djamena permanently. He wrote his first texts in 1999 and joined the Jeunes Rayons Solaires in 2000. In 2006, he began his solo career.

In 2009, Yilmian was a finalist at the Festival Gibao hip hop in Libreville. In 2012, he met Célestin Mawndoé, with whom he worked on forging a Chadian music identity and switched to writing his songs in Bua. In 2016, he released his second album, Bunda Phénomène. His third album, C’est le peuple, was delayed by the COVID-19 pandemic. After a hiatus, he returned to music in 2025, releasing singles and performing at a concert in N'Djamena.

Alongside his music career, he was active in the political party Les Transformateurs, even playing a role in the National Transitional Council in 2024.

== Death ==
Ray's Kim Edm died after a short illness on 6 October 2025, at the age of 36.

== Awards ==
- Révélation de N’Djam Hip-Hop (2007)
- Meilleur rappeur à N’DjamVi (2010)
- Meilleur artiste de l’année à Dari Awards (2016)
- Meilleur artiste rappeur de N’DjamVi (2016)
- Nomination au Canal d’Or (2017)
- Meilleur rappeur à N’Djam Hip-Hop (2017)
- Meilleur rappeur selon la plateforme VMTF (2018)
