= Fatima Haram Acyl =

Chadian Politician

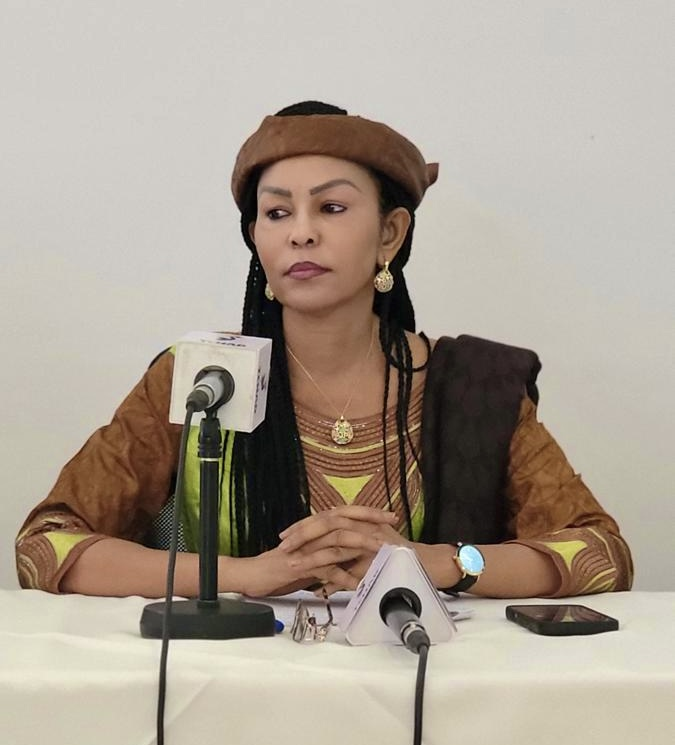

Minister Delegate to the Minister of Finance in charge of Economy, Planning and International Cooperation
- Incumbent
- Assumed office 27 May 2024
- President: Mahamat Idriss Déby
- Prime Minister: Allamaye Halina

Vice President of the CEMAC Commission
- In office 2017 – May 2023

Commissioner for Trade and Industry of the African Union
- In office 2012–2017

Personal details
- Born: Fatima Haram Acyl
- Parent: Mahamat Abderahim Acyl (father)
- Relatives: Hinda Déby Itno (sister)
- Education: Xavier University of Cincinnati; University of Moncton

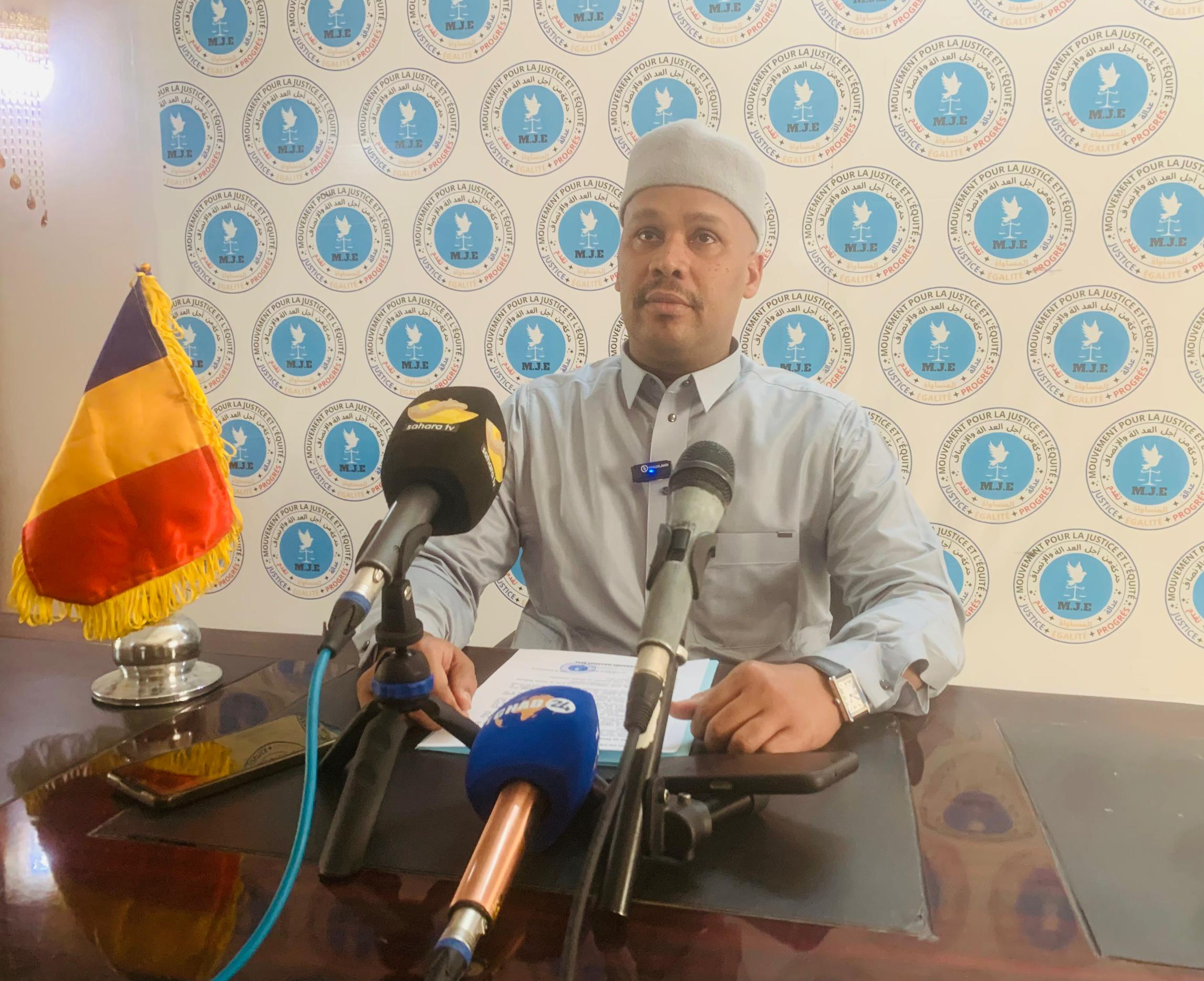
Abderahim Mahamat Acyl, father of Fatima Haram Acyl

Fatima Haram Acyl is a Chadian senior civil servant and politician. She holds an MBA in finance from Xavier University in Cincinnati, United States, and a Bachelor of Science in Business (operations research) from the University of Moncton, New Brunswick. She is the daughter of Mahamat Abderahim Acyl, a Chadian politician and former diplomat.

== Biography ==
Holding an MBA in finance from Xavier University of Louisiana and a BS in business from the University of Moncton, Acyl began her career in the United States in auditing before moving into international organizations, including the United Nations Office for Project Services (UNOPS), where she served as Director of Finance and Administration.

In 2004, she became Deputy Managing Director of the Agricultural and Commercial Bank (BAC). She later served as Commissioner for Trade and Industry of the African Union from 2012 to 2017.

She subsequently served as Vice President of the Commission of the Economic and Monetary Community of Central Africa (CEMAC) from 2017 to May 2023.

== Political career ==
In 2024, she joined the government of Allamaye Halina as Minister Delegate to the Minister of Finance, in charge of Economy and Planning. She was reappointed in February 2025 as Minister Delegate to the Minister of Finance, in charge of Economy, Planning and International Cooperation.
