= Abakar Abdelkerim Daoud =

Chadian military officer

Lieutenant General Abakar Abdelkerim Daoud (born 1968) is a Chadian military officer.

== Biography ==
He is a member of the Zaghawa people from the Wadi Fira region and is nicknamed Kirekeyno (“the one who does not flee”, in Zaghawa).

He fought alongside former Chadian President Idriss Déby during the rebellion against the regime of Hissène Habré in 1990. He was appointed head of presidential security in 1991 before leading the presidential guard a year later. He was wounded in combat around Lake Chad in 1992 and treated in France for over a year.

He was made Chief of the National Gendarmerie in 2008, Chief of Staff of the Army (CEMAT), Advisor to the Ministry of Defense and finally Chief of the General Staff of the Armed Forces (CEMGA) until the death of President Déby. He successfully commanded the armed forces in the 2021 Northern Chad offensive.

After the death of Idriss Déby on 20 April 2021 and the seizure of power by his son Mahamat Idriss Déby, he became a member of the Transitional Military Council.
