= Chief of the General Staff (Chad) =

Head of the Chad National Army

Chief of the General Staff of the Chadian Army
- رئيس هيئة الأركان العامة; Le chef d'état major général des armées tchadiennes
- Incumbent; General Abakar Abdelkerim Daoud since 31 January 2020
- Ministry of Defense
- Reports to: Minister of Defence
- Appointer: President of Chad
- Formation: 1960

The Chief of the General Staff (Arabic: رئيس هيئة الأركان العامة, French: Le chef d'état major général des armées tchadiennes) is the professional head of the Chad National Army. He is responsible for the administration and the operational control of the Chadian military. The current Chief of General Staff is General Abakar Abdelkerim Daoud who was appointed by President Idriss Déby on 31 January 2020, succeeding General Tahir Erda Tahirou.

== List of officeholders ==
No.	Portrait	Chief of Staff	Took office	Left office	Time in office	Ref.
?	Daoud Soumain	General; Daoud Soumain (?–2008)	?	2 February 2008 †	?	
?	Abderahim Bahar Itno	General; Abderahim Bahar Itno	March 2008	29 April 2009	1 year, 1 month	
?	Hassane Saleh Al Gadam Al Jinedi	General; Hassane Saleh Al Gadam Al Jinedi	29 April 2009	?	?	
?	Alain Mbaidodenande Djionadji	General; Alain Mbaidodenande Djionadji	?	?	?	
?	Brahim Seid Mahamat	General; Brahim Seid Mahamat	12 February 2013	22 March 2019	6 years, 38 days	
?	Tahir Erda Tahirou	General; Tahir Erda Tahirou	22 March 2019	31 January 2020	315 days	
?	Abakar Abdelkerim Daoud	General; Abakar Abdelkerim Daoud (born 1968)	31 January 2020	Incumbent	6 years, 295 days	
