= Les Transformateurs =

The Transformers Les Transformateurs المحوِّلون
- Founder: Succès Masra
- Founded: 29 April 2018
- Ideology: Pan-Africanism; Social democracy
- Political position: Centre-left

Website
- app.transformateurstchad.africa

Les Transformateurs (English: The Transformers; Arabic: المحوِّلون, romanized: al-muḥawwilūn) is a political party in Chad. It was part of the opposition to the Chadian President Idriss Déby, and the Transitional Military Council that succeeded him after his death in 2021.

== History ==
The party was founded on 29 April 2018 by Succès Masra, to bring together Chadians "from the outside as well as from the inside" and to turn the country into a functioning social democracy.

Masra and his party played a prominent role in the 2022 Chadian protests, condemning security forces for violence against protesters. Masra fled the country in the aftermath of the protests and lived in exile in the United States for some time. In his absence, the party's registration was temporarily suspended by the Transitional Military Council, but was reinstated in January 2023.

On 1 January 2024, Masra was appointed Prime Minister of Chad, following an agreement brokered by the Economic Community of Central African States permitting Masra to return to Chad after an amnesty was granted to him.

In the 2024 presidential election, Succès Masra ran for president as a candidate of the Les Transformateurs party. It was the first time in Chad's history that a president and a prime minister faced each other in a presidential election. Masra won only 18.5% of the vote, the 2nd-most voted candidate at the elections, but lost by a significant margin to incumbent president Mahamat Déby.

== Election results ==
=== Presidential elections ===
Election	Party candidate	First round		Second round		Result
Election	Party candidate	Votes	%	Votes	%	Result
2024	Succès Masra	1,148,245	18.54%	—	—	Lost ✗
