= Military Command Council for the Salvation of the Republic =

Chadian militant rebel group founded in 2016

- Conseil de commandement militaire pour le salut de la République
- Logo of the group
- Leaders: Mahamat Hassani Bulmay (POW) (until 2017); Mahamat Tahir Acheick (2017–18); Michelot Yogogombaye (c. 2018); Rachid Mahamat Tahir (c. 2021)
- Dates active: 2016 – present
- Split from: Front for Change and Concord in Chad (FACT)
- Ideology: Chadian nationalism Overthrow of Idriss Déby and Mahamat Déby Itno; Anti-Tribalism
- Size: 4,500 (self-claim)
- Part of: National Front for Democracy and Justice in Chad

The Military Command Council for the Salvation of the Republic (French: Conseil de commandement militaire pour le salut de la République; abbreviated CCMSR) (Note: It is also known as "Military Command Council for the Wellbeing of the Republic".) is a Chadian militant rebel group that seeks to overthrow the government of Chad. Founded in 2016, it currently operates in the border regions of northern Chad, southern Libya, eastern Niger, and western Sudan. The CCMSR has become involved in the Second Libyan Civil War, and took control of the Kouri Bougoudi area in northern Chad in 2018.

== History ==
=== Background, foundation, and initial activities ===
After taking power in 1990, Chadian President Idriss Déby was challenged by numerous armed Chadian opposition groups. Although numerous and relatively powerful, the rebel factions were never able to fully unite to topple Déby who was thus able to crush them repeatedly in the course of several civil wars and insurgencies. Over time, the military of Chad grew increasingly powerful, while the Chadian rebels lost their backers and sources of funding. As a result, most of them relocated from Chad to Libya and Sudan in 2009, where they worked as mercenaries to remain active and make a living. About 11,000 Chadian mercenaries operated in Libya by August 2017, fighting for numerous Libyan parties such as the Presidential Council/Government of National Accord (GNA) and the Khalifa Haftar-loyal Libyan National Army (LNA).

Several Chadian dissident groups unified under the leadership of long-time insurgent commander Mahamat Mahdi Ali in March 2016, forming the "Front for Change and Concord in Chad" (FACT) and allying themselves with pro-GNA forces in Libya. FACT's unity collapsed almost immediately, however, as violent disputes erupted and part of the group split off in March. This splinter faction consisted of Kreda clansmen and adopted the name "Military Command Council for the Salvation of the Republic" (CCMSR), electing former UFDD spokesman Mahamat Hassani Bulmay its secretary-general.

Becoming active in the border regions of northern Chad, southern Libya, eastern Niger, and western Sudan, CCMSR allied itself with the pro-GNA Benghazi Defense Brigades, and started to build up its strength in Libya for a rebellion against the Chadian government. It also started to clash with pro-Haftar forces, and one of its bases near Sabha was bombed by the Haftar-aligned Libyan Air Force in April 2016.

=== Return to Chad ===
The CCMSR was the first armed Chadian opposition group to return to its home country since 2010, namely when it launched a raid and killed 12 Chadian soldiers in April 2017. It subsequently won some attention in the region, and spread Bulmay's writings among the Chadian population. His messages included support for the interests of the Chadian region of Bahr el Gazel as well as strong criticism of local politicians who worked with Déby's government. Bulmay's ideas found some appeal among Bahr el Gazel's youth. A major clash between the CCMSR and the Chadian military took place on 18 August 2017, as a CSSMR column ran by chance into a Chadian Special Forces patrol near Tekro in Ennedi, routing the surprised government forces after a short battle.

The rebel group suffered a heavy blow in October 2017, when the Nigerien government arrested three of its top leaders in Agadez, namely secretary-general Bulmay, spokesman Ahmat Yacoub Adam, and external affairs secretary Dr. Abderahman Issa Youssouf. The group attempted to force the Nigerien government to release them by threatening to launch a retaliatory attack, but Niger nevertheless extradited them to Chad. Despite its previous threat, CCMSR refrained from attacking Niger in retaliation. Bulmay, Adam, and Youssouf were subsequently put on trial in Chad, charged with the capital offense of terrorism, and transferred to the desert prison of Koro Toro. CCMSR appointed Mahamat Tahir Acheick as replacement secretary-general who in turn was succeeded by Michelot Yogogombaye in 2018. Yogogombaye, a loyalist of former Chadian President Hissène Habré, operates from Paris.

In March and May 2018, the CCMSR was repeatedly bombed by the Haftar-loyal Libyan Air Force, though these attacks had almost no effect. In contrast, one Libyan air raid in June against one of the militia's bases at Um Aranib reportedly resulted in significant losses. At some point, the CCMSR joined a Chadian rebel coalition, the "National Front for Democracy and Justice in Chad" which was founded in July 2018.

=== Control of Kouri Bougoudi ===
On 11 August 2018, CCMSR launched a major attack on the military outpost at Kouri Bougoudi in the Tibesti Mountains, later claiming to have killed 73 and captured 45 soldiers while suffering just 11 casualties (4 dead, 7 wounded). The Chadian government initially attempted to deny that the attack had taken place, and then downplayed its significance. While the CCMSR offered to release its prisoners in return for the release of Bulmay, Adam, and Youssouf, the Chadian government refused to negotiate with "savage mercenaries, bandits [and] thugs", and instead ordered local miners to abandon their camp at Kouri Bougoudi. The military subsequently retreated from the area on 22 August, leaving it to the CCMSR and illegal miners. From then on, the Chadian Air Force launched several bombing raids in the region, targeting the Kouri Bougoudi mining camp and camel herds, killing several civilians and depriving locals of their livelihood. Meanwhile, the CCMSR continued its attacks against government positions, such as at Tarbou in Tibesti Region (21 September), and Miski in Borkou Region (24 October). Some locals criticised the CCMSR of exploiting and worsening ethnic tensions in the Tibesti Mountains.

At the same time, tensions increased in southern Libya, as native civilians and armed forces were increasingly opposed to the presence of Chadian militants, resulting in numerous clashes. In late October 2018, Haftar's LNA launched an offensive in the Murzuq basin to evict rival Libyan and Chadian groups, including the CCMSR, from the region. It has been speculated that the Chadian militants who attacked the LNA base at Traghan on 27 December 2018, were connected to the CCMSR. On 12 January 2019, the CCMSR clashed with the LNA-allied Sudanese SLM/A-Minnawi at Gatroun in southern Libya, and with the pro-Déby Sudanese Justice and Equality Movement at the gold mines of Kouri Bougoudi in northern Chad. By February 2019, the CCMSR came under increasing pressure by the LNA and its allies, as the latter had launched another offensive to evict the GNA and Chadian rebels from southern Libya.

=== Continued cross-border raids ===
By August 2019, the CCMSR had lost control of Kouri Bougoudi, but continued to launch cross-border raids into the Tibesti Mountains. The Chadian military responded with a "crackdown" in the area and declared a regional state of emergency for five months. On 19 February 2020, CCMSR troops launched another raid against Kouri Bougoudi, resulting in a larger battle with security forces. Both sides claimed to have inflicted heavy losses on their opponents before the rebels retreated back into Libya.

When Idriss Déby was killed in combat during a FACT-led offensive, his son Mahamat Déby Itno took power. The CCMSR consequently declared its commitment to overthrow Déby Itno's Transitional Military Council (TMC), and supported FACT in its offensive. At this point, the CCMSR was headed by Rachid Mahamat Tahir.

== Ideology ==
CCMSR portrays itself as Chadian nationalist movement that is opposed to the authoritarian regime of Idriss Déby which it regards as uncaring and oppressive toward the Chadian people. In one statement, Mahamat Hassani Bulmay described Déby's government as "clan despotism in its most pernicious and most abject form", and stated that the only way to end his rule is through war. According to Bulmay, the Chadian President had a "double choice, the grave or the prison". Furthermore, the CCMSR has voiced its support for the interests of marginalized peoples and areas in northern and central Chad.

Islam also plays a part in the ideology of the CCMSR, and is used by the group to rally local support, form alliances in southern Libya, and sway public opinion against Déby and his inner circle, whom the CCMSR has accused of being "bad Muslims". Despite this, the CCMSR is not an overtly religious organization. Most notably, its former head Bulmay was known for being not devout.

== Strength ==
The CCMSR claims to have 4,500 fighters under its command, most of them members of the Toubou people's Daza subgroup, as well as smaller numbers of Arabs, Maba, and Zaghawa. It is the largest group in the "National Front for Democracy and Justice in Chad" rebel coalition. There have been allegations that the CCMSR is financed by Qatar, as it is allied to Libyan militias which are supported by Qatar.
