= Battle of Kouri Bougoudi (2019) =

- Part of Insurgency in Chad (2016–present)
Date	January 12, 2019
Location	Kouri Bougoudi, Chad
Result	Indecisive

Belligerents
CCMSR	JEM; Chadian government (per CCMSR)

Casualties and losses
3 dead, 12 wounded (per MDD); Dozens killed (per AFP and RFI)	67 killed (per MDD)

On January 12, 2019, militants from the Chadian rebel group Military Command Council for the Salvation of the Republic (CCMSR) skirmished with Sudanese rebels from the Justice and Equality Movement (JEM).

== Background ==
In late 2018, CCMSR rebels ambushed a Chadian base in the northern town of Kouri Bougoudi, after years of dormancy since the end of the Chadian Civil War in 2010. The attack was repelled by Chadian forces, but underlying tensions between gold miners and the government remained. Between December 27 and 29, 2018, communal clashes between Libyan Arabs and Chadian Ouaddaians left at least 30 people dead and 200 injured. Several Darfuris were also killed in the attacks, which may have prompted the Chadian government-aligned JEM to intervene.

== Battle ==
JEM launched their assault into a CCMSR base near Kouri Bougoudi on January 12, with two major clashes taking place during that day. In a statement, the CCMSR stated that the Chadian government aided the JEM during the second battle. AFP and RFI both reported that the fighting was intense and left dozens dead on both sides. Mahamat Ali, the founder of a new rebel group Movement for Development and Democracy (MDD), stated that 67 JEM fighters were killed alongside 3 dead and 12 wounded CCMSR fighters.
