= 2021 Northern Chad offensive =

Rebel offensive in Northern Chad

Northern Chad offensive
- Part of the insurgency in Northern Chad
- Tibesti Region in northern Chad, where clashes began
Date	11 April – 9 May 2021 (4 weeks)
Location	Tibesti Region and Kanem Region, Chad
Result	Chadian military victory: President Idriss Déby is killed in action and succeeded by Mahamat Déby as head of the Transitional Military Council; Chadian military retakes positions

Belligerents
Chad; Supported by: France (alleged by rebels); Niger	Front for Change and Concord in Chad; Military Command Council for the Salvation of the Republic

Commanders and leaders
(Chad) Idriss Déby (DOW) (Chad) Mahamat Déby (Chad) Gen. Abakar Abdelkerim Daoud	Mahamat Mahdi Ali (FACT); Rachid Mahamat Tahir

Units involved
Chadian National Army	

Casualties and losses
Commander killed 11 soldiers killed 58 soldiers wounded (Chadian government figures); 1 helicopter destroyed	540 fighters killed 210 fighters captured (Chadian government figures)
- 6 civilians killed during protests

The Northern Chad offensive was a military offensive in Northern Chad, initiated by the Chadian rebel group Front for Change and Concord in Chad (FACT), took place from 11 April to 9 May 2021. It began in the Tibesti Region in the north of the country following the 2021 Chadian presidential election.

Chadian President Idriss Déby was injured during the offensive on 19 April 2021 and died the next day, and his son Mahamat Déby became acting President of Chad on the same day. A special presidential election was expected in 2022, but was not held until 2024. The offensive ended in a Chadian military victory, though clashes continued in the country's north.

== Background ==
In the 2021 Chadian presidential election, Idriss Déby, who seized power in the 1990 coup d'état, was expected to extend his mandate of 30 years in power. The Independent National Election Commission (CENI) had indicated that Déby had taken a large lead with 30% of the votes cast still to be counted. Déby won all but one of the departments of the country. In not recognizing the results, the opposition had called to boycott the 11 April election with Yacine Abderaman Sakine of the Reform Party refusing to concede the victory to Déby. Preliminary results showed on 25 April that Déby had won a landslide with 79.32% of the electorate. Déby was seen in Europe, the United States and China as an ally in the fight against the Boko Haram insurgency and other terrorism in West and Central Africa.

On the day of the election, the Libyan-based group Front for Change and Concord in Chad (FACT) launched an attack on a border post of the military of Chad. FACT is under the protection of Libyan military warlord Khalifa Haftar and often clashes with the Chadian military. A March 2021 report by the United Nations stated that the rebels were based at the Al Jufra Airbase in Libya, which is also used by Russian Wagner Group mercenaries and has received cargo flights carrying weapons from the United Arab Emirates. In addition, the FACT rebels prepared for the campaign in Chad using the UAE-supplied weapons.

== Events ==
After the 11 April border attack, the FACT forces entered the country on convoys and clashed with the army in several cities and towns as they headed toward N'Djamena, the capital of Chad. As a result of the growing instability, the United States and the United Kingdom withdrew diplomatic staff from the country. On 19 April, FACT claimed to have taken control of the former Borkou-Ennedi-Tibesti prefecture.

As of 19 April 2021, clashes continued between FACT forces and elements of the Chadian Armed Forces. FACT forces claimed independence in the northern part of the Tibesti Region. At least 300 FACT fighters were reportedly killed in the clashes whilst at least five Chadian soldiers had also been killed during the confrontation, which increased political tension in the country. The army said on 19 April that they had "completely destroyed" FACT convoys heading towards the capital. An army spokesman said that the convoys were "decimated" in the northern province of Kanem. After the clashes, Gen. Azem Bermandoa Agouna of the Chadian Armed Forces claimed that the army had captured 150 FACT fighters and also reported 36 wounded Chadian soldiers.

On 19 April 2021, President Idriss Déby was fatally wounded on the frontline. His son Mahamat Déby succeeded him as head of the Transitional Military Council of Chad (TMC). Rebels vowed to continue their offensive on the capital following Déby's death.

The following day, FACT rebels defended their campaign towards Chad's capital, N'Djamena, and rejected the transitional military junta led by Déby's son as the legitimate government of Chad. Although stores and other facilities remained open, many civilians reportedly chose to stay home amidst rising fears of conflict. Opposition politicians asked Déby's son Mahamat for a quick civilian transition. Another rebel group, the Military Command Council for the Salvation of the Republic (CCMSR), also declared that it would support FACT in its offensive against the TMC.

On 21 April, a rebel base in northern Chad was allegedly bombed. Rebels claimed that airstrikes were used to try and target their leader, Mahamat Mahadi Ali, and accused France of supporting the raid.

On 24 April, a rebel spokesman said that FACT was "preparing to advance" towards N'Djamena and that they "did not accept any military government". The spokesman further accused France of conducting airstrikes against the group, something which France denied.

On 25 April, the Chadian government claimed that defeated rebels fled to Niger and that Nigerien forces were helping Chadian forces. On 27 April, the government claimed to have destroyed four rebel vehicles. On 28 April clashes resumed in the Kanem region with land and air forces attacking rebel positions. On 29 April, rebels claimed to have captured Nokou in Kanem after destroying a helicopter. This was denied by government forces, which claimed to have shelled the rebel position. A military spokesman stated that the helicopter claimed to have been shot down by rebels crashed due to "technical failures" far from the battlefield.

On 30 April, the Chadian forces claimed to have recaptured all territories surrounding Nokou and that six Chadian soldiers had been killed while "hundreds" of rebels had been also killed during the battle. The Chadian forces also reported 22 soldiers wounded. On 6 May Chadian government claimed that FACT rebel have been repelled after fighting near border with Niger causing rebels to flee north. Security forces were clearing the area.

On 9 May 2021, the TMC claimed victory over the rebels in the northern offensive, however, clashes continued and a FACT spokesman said it was not aware of an end to the fighting. He added that the group "will comment when it has reliable and credible information". Meanwhile, cheering was reported in N'Djamena amidst a welcome to the returning troops from the north. The Chadian military's victory was confirmed when Béchir Mahadi, FACT spokesman, asked the Chadian military to respect the rights of the prisoners of war and to let "those who are still in rebellion outside the country to join the legal system so that together they can contribute to building a country of law and democracy".

== Reactions ==
Reactions to Déby's death included condolences, in addition to condemnation of the ongoing violence in Chad. They came from the African Union, the European Union and the United Nations, as well as from leaders and representatives of several countries, including China, France, Israel, Mali, Morocco, Niger, Senegal, Turkey and the United States. On 22 April 2021, France publicly defended the military takeover of the government by Déby's son, despite it being unconstitutional, saying that it was necessary under "exceptional circumstances." The United Nations General Assembly held a tribute session for Déby on 3 May 2021.

On 27 April 2021, protests erupted in N'Djamena, asking the Transitional Military Council to concede to civilian transition. A woman was killed in the capital when anti-military protesters attacked a bus, while a man was killed in the south of the country. Police have used tear gas to disperse demonstrations whereas the TMC has banned protests. Opposition politicians have labelled the TMC takeover as a "coup". On 2 May 2021, the TMC lifted a nighttime curfew imposed in the country in the aftermath of President Déby's death. The TMC also acknowledged the deaths of six protesters during demonstrations in the past week.
