= Chadian constitution of 2023 =

Supreme law of Chad

The Constitution of the Republic of Chad (French: Constitution de la République du Tchad) is the supreme law of Chad. It is Chad's ninth constitution since independence from France in 1960 and was officially adopted on 28 December 2023 following a constitutional referendum held on 17 December. It replaced the 2018 Constitution.

The text establishes the Sixth Republic with the main framework of a decentralized unitary state, a semi-presidential republic (reverting the change to a full presidential system that had been made in 2018), officially re-establishing the post of Prime Minister, lowering the presidential term from six to five, with re-election permitted just once, limiting the minimum age for the presidency from 40 to 35, diving the country into 23 provinces, officially creating a Senate, and strengthening the independence of the judiciary.
