= Chadian constitution of 2018 =

Supreme law of Chad

The Constitution of the Republic of Chad (French: Constitution de la République du Tchad) is the supreme law of Chad. It was Chad's eighth constitution since independence from France in 1960, it was adopted on 4 May 2018 and replaced the 1996 Constitution.

The text establishes the Fifth Republic within the framework of a full presidential republic, abolishing the post of Prime Minister, and increasing the presidential term from five years to six, effectively extending President Idriss Déby's 28 year rule. In 2021, after Idriss Déby was killed, the newly formed military junta the Transitional Military Council, led by Idriss' son, Mahamat. The text was eventually replaced by the 2023 Constitution following a 2023 constitutional referendum held in December of that year.

== 2021 suspension ==
In April 2021, the Transitional Military Council suspended the Constitution. In its place, it issued a charter, which granted General Mahamat Déby the powers of the Presidency as interim president and named him head of the armed forces.
