= Lydie Beassemda =

Chadian politician and women's rights promotor

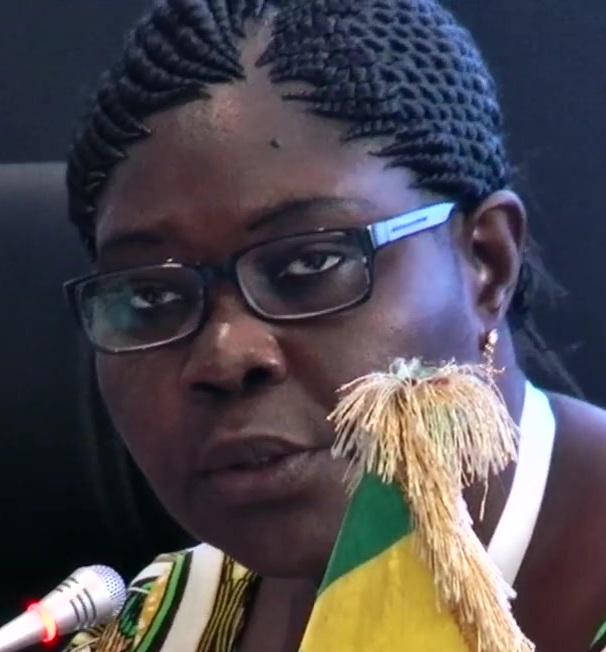
- Born: 1967 (age 58–59)
- Citizenship: Chad
- Education: University of Quebec in montreal
- Occupation: Politicial minister
- Known for: Higher Education and Research under Chad's translational military council
- Other political affiliations: Party for integral democracy
- Family: Lucie Baessemda
- Website: https://www.winssolutions.org/lydie-beassemda-women-in-chad-agriculture/

Lydie Beassemda (born c. 1967) is a Chadian politician. Since 2 May 2021, she has been Minister of Higher Education and Research under Chad's Transitional Military Council. A campaigner for women's rights since 2005, she turned to politics in 2016 as a leading member of the Party for Democracy and Full Independence (PDI) founded by her father and headed the party following her father's death in 2018. Following government reforms, in May 2018 Beassemda was appointed Minister of Production, Irrigation and Agricultural Equipment. In March 2021, she became the first woman to stand as a presidential candidate in Chad when she participated in the 2021 elections but received only 3.16% of the votes. A military council took power on 20 April 2021 following the death of President Idriss Déby who had been elected president.

== Early life and education ==
Born in the late 1960s in N'Djamena, Lydie Beassemda was the third of seven children in the family of Beassemda Djebaret Julien (1950–2016) who was also active in Chadian politics. After passing the baccalauréat in 1989, she studied biology, graduating from the University of N'Djamena (1994) and earning a master's degree in Nigeria's Abdou Moumouni University (1996). She later continued her studies in Canada, receiving two DESS diplomas (degrees for in-depth studies) in food production and in development planning from the Université du Québec à Montréal in 2009.

== Career ==
In October 1998, Beassemda was employed as a technician at Chad's Nutrition and Food Technology Centre. From 2001 to 2005, she was involved in the collaborative research project between Chad and Cameroon on oil exploitation (Gramp/TC). She then became increasingly interested in women's rights. In 2004, she founded Mudesoft in support of women's professional development, she became a coordinator at the Swissaid Foundation (2005–2010), a liaison officer for the Women's Associations' Information and Liaison Group Celiaf from 2007 and a founding member of Caid (Caisse d’appui aux initiatives de développement) in 2009. She also participated in the Oxfam Intermon women's rights programme (2009–2010).

Beassemia was a candidate in the third district of N'Djamena for the legislative elections in 2011 and the municipal elections in 2012. In 2014, she was appointed national secretary of the PDI party founded by her father. In 2016, she coordinated her father's election campaign and headed the party after his death in August 2018. Following the Chadian government reforms, in May 2018 she was appointed Minister of Production, Irrigation and Agricultural Equipment. In March 2021, she became the first woman to stand as a candidate in Chadian presidential elections but received only 3.16% of the votes.

Since 2 May 2021, Lydie Beassemda has been the Chadian Minister of Higher Education and Research under the Transitional Military Council.
