= Agence nationale de sécurité =

Chadian intelligence agency

Agence nationale de sécurité de l'Etat
- Agence nationale de sécurité de l'État

Agency overview
- Formed: 1990; 36 years ago
- Preceding Agency: Direction de la documentation et de la sécurité
- Jurisdiction: Government of Chad
- Headquarters: N'Djamena, Chad
- Agency executive: Ismail Souleymane Lony, Director General

The Agence nationale de sécurité de l'Etat (ANSE) is the intelligence agency of the Republic of Chad. It is the successor of the Documentation and Security Directorate (DDS) which was created by the former President Hissène Habré. While the ANSE was not created as a law enforcement agency (those duties instead being done by the National Gendarmerie) they were given powers of arrest in 2017. The current director is General Ismail Souleymane Lony, who replaced General Ahmed Kogri 21 February 2024.

== Activities ==
The ANSE has been active in fighting against Boko Haram.

The ANSE has been accused of human rights violations, continuing the legacy left by the former DDS that it replaced. Those detained by the ANSE are unable to contact their family members or their lawyers, and frequently nobody is aware of their detention. Critics maintain that the ANSE is used as an armed wing of Déby's Patriotic Salvation Movement rather than an independent organization focused on counter-terrorism.
