= National Transitional Council (Chad) =

2022–2024 de facto government of Chad

The National Transitional Council (French: Conseil national de transition, CNT) was the de facto government of Chad from 2022 to 2024. The CNT replaced the Transitional Military Council and the dissolved National Assembly. It acted as an interim parliament for the country in its transition to democracy, tasked with preparations for elections in 2024. It was led by the Prime Minister of Chad.

== History ==
=== Formation ===
Under the Transitional Military Council (CMT), military authorities seized power in Chad following the death of President Idriss Déby in April 2021 and were led by Déby's son, Mahamat Déby. Initially, the council promised a period of 18-months before holding elections in October 2022. However, a new plan approved on 1 October 2022 following dialogue in August and September, extended the transition another two years until elections in October 2024. The CMT was then dissolved on 10 October and replaced by the CNT headed by members appointed by Déby, the then-Transitional President of Chad.

The CNT acted as Chad's parliament. Following a national reconciliation dialogue in early October 2022 that recommended Déby's number of deputies in the CNT, Déby increased it from 93 to 197 on 7 November. The move aimed to integrate a larger variety of members from different political parties, civil society organizations, and rebel groups that joined the national dialogue.

=== 2023 referendum ===
On 27 June 2023, 96% of all members of the CMT voted in favour of a new draft constitution. The new constitution was put forward to Chadian voters as a referendum on 17 December 2023 and passed with 85.9% of the vote.

On 1 January 2024, former opposition leader Succès Masra was appointed as Prime Minister of Chad. Masra was previously in exile, but returned following reconciliation with the government in November. Mahamat Ahmad Alhab, the Secretary-General of the Presidency, said Masra premiership would continue until the 2024 parliamentary elections.
