= 2023 Chadian constitutional referendum =

A constitutional referendum in Chad was held on 17 December 2023 on a new constitution formulated following the death of President Idriss Déby in 2021. The draft had been approved by the National Transitional Council on 27 June 2023. Provisional results were announced on 24 December 2023, and they were validated by the Supreme Court of Chad on 28 December 2023.

== Background ==
Since the death of President Idriss Déby on 20 April 2021, Chad has been ruled by a military junta headed by his son, Mahamat Déby. The Transitional Military Council ruled from 2021 to 2022, before being replaced by the National Transitional Council with the intention of transitioning Chad into civilian rule and a democracy. The military authorities of Chad have described the referendum as an important step for Chad's transition into a democracy by paving the way for elections in 2024.

== Campaign ==
=== The "Yes" side ===
The "Yes" vote was endorsed by the military-led National Transitional Council headed by General Mahamat Deby, the former ruling Patriotic Salvation Movement (MPS) and the main opposition UNDR of Prime Minister Saleh Kebzabo.

Some supporters of the referendum argued that it offered Chadians more freedom and independence by allowing them elect their own local representatives. Some also rejected the "No" side's call for the constitution to transform Chad into a federation, saying it would "divide Chadians into micro-states".

=== The "No" side ===
Smaller parts of the opposition and rebel groups supported a "No" vote or said they will boycott the referendum. Boycotters said that the military junta held too much control over the referendum's process, and described the vote as a "farce" to ensure the military leadership continue to hold control over Chad. Fidel Amakye Owusu, an expert in international relations, also described the referendum as a way to legitimise Mahamat Déby's rule over the country.

Majority of "No" campaigners disagreed with the new constitution maintaining a centrally-governed state, instead supporting a federal state saying that Chad as a centralized state has failed to develop the nation. A poll by the Network of Chadian Journalists and Reporters in early 2023 found that 71% of Chadians favour a federal system. The new constitution however devolved some power to local governments and representatives, who would be elected, whilst still keeping a unitary system.

== Conduct ==
The referendum has been criticized for a lack of transparency around voter registration and an audit of the physical infrastructure and technology needed to conduct the referendum.

== Proposed changes and contents ==
The new draft aimed to replicate elements of the 1996 constitution.

- Chad is defined as a decentralized unitary state operating under a semi-presidential system of government (reverting the change to a full presidential system that had been made in 2018).
- The term of office of the president was reduced from six years to five years, with re-election permitted once. The minimum age for presidential candidates was also lowered from 40 to 35, with candidates required to have been born a citizen of Chad to Chadian parents.
- The draft constitution also ratifies the existence of the Senate, the upper house of the legislature theoretically created by the 2018 constitution but never implemented.
- The country is to be divided into 23 regions, or provinces.
- The independence of the judiciary was strengthened, with the presidency of the Superior Council of the Judiciary being awarded to the President of the Supreme Court (in the current constitution, the President of the Supreme Court holds the lesser position of second vice-president, behind the President and the Minister of Justice."
- The National Election Management Agency is to be set up as an independent and permanent structure to manage all electoral and referendum-related operations. It replaces the Independent National Electoral Commission, which had previously been directly under the government.
- The High Court of Justice (previously a chamber of the Supreme Court) becomes an independent institution again. "It is the only court empowered to judge the President of the Republic, the presidents of major institutions, and members of the government as well as their accomplices in cases of high treason and similar cases."
- The Constitutional Council (previously the third chamber of the Supreme Court) will regain control over "reviewing the constitutionality of laws, international treaties and agreements, organic laws and other laws on public freedoms and fundamental rights. It is the institution that will administer the oath of the elected President of the Republic, rule on disputes in national elections, and regulate the functioning of institutions and the activities of public authorities", etc.
- The National Commission for Human Rights, an independent administrative authority intended to promote and safeguard human rights and fundamental freedoms, is established.
- The Ombudsman of the Republic, "an independent administrative authority which will participate in the peaceful settlement of conflicts, receive complaints concerning the functioning of the public administration, autonomous communities, public establishments and other entities vested with a public service mission" is established.

== Results ==
On 24 December 2023, according to the Commission nationale chargée de l'organisation du référendum constitutionnel (Conorec), the "yes" vote won with 86% of the vote, compared to 14% for the "no". Official results were validated by the Supreme Court of Chad on 28 December.

Choice	Votes	%
Yes	4,220,365	85.90
No	692,804	14.10
Total	4,913,169	100.00
Valid votes	4,913,169	94.87
Invalid/blank votes	265,445	5.13
Total votes	5,178,614	100.00
Registered voters/turnout	8,237,768	62.86
Source: Cour suprême
