= Front for Change and Concord in Chad =

Chadian political and rebel group

- جبهة التغيير والوفاق في تشاد
- Leader: Mahamat Mahdi Ali
- Founded: 2016
- Split from: UFDD
- Country: Chad
- Headquarters: Fezzan
- Status: active
- Size: Between 500 and 1500 combatants (2021)
- Website: fact-tchad.com

The Front for Change and Concord in Chad (Arabic: جبهة التغيير والوفاق في تشاد, French: Front pour l’alternance et la concorde au Tchad), or FACT, is a political and military organisation created by SG Mahamat Mahdi Ali in March 2016 in Tanua, in the north of Chad, with the goal of overthrowing the government of Chad. It is a splinter group of the Union of Forces for Democracy and Development (UFDD). Ali declared his preparation for military operations against President Idriss Déby. The group was responsible for the death of Déby in April 2021, when he was killed while commanding troops on the frontline fighting the militants.

== Origins ==
The group was founded by dissident Chadian army officers who had split from the UFDD. FACT was organized as a union of different rebel factions in March 2016, but it quickly suffered from internal disputes. Dissidents split off and organized as the Military Command Council for the Salvation of the Republic (CCMSR). In its current iteration, FACT emerged in April 2016.

== Military actions ==
=== Second Libyan Civil War ===
In the first years of its existence, FACT mostly operated as mercenaries for various Libyan factions.

In December 2016, Libyan National Army (LNA) forces bombed FACT forces twice in the Jufra District, resulting in one death. The LNA then bombed FACT forces on border between Libya and Chad. FACT claimed one person was killed and two were wounded. A few months later in June 2017, a militia group allied with FACT, Third Force, handed over the Jufra District to the LNA. FACT was allowed to remain there under a tacit non-aggression pact with the LNA. Due to the LNA's cooperation with Russian troops, French journalist Jerome Tubiana has speculated that FACT was trained by the Russian military contractor Wagner Group during this period. An article in April 2021 by The New York Times stated that the weapons used for training of FACT by the Wagner group were supplied by the United Arab Emirates, who is alleged by the Pentagon to be funding the Wagner group. The LNA tried to get FACT to join its forces, but FACT wanted to remain neutral; their staying neutral hurt their ability to secure roads against bandits and terrorists.

From late 2017 to October 2018, FACT forces clashed with ISIL. These clashes resulted in the death of at least three FACT militants and two jihadists. At some point FACT signed a non-aggression pact with the LNA.

=== Insurgency in Northern Chad ===
On the evening of 11 April 2021, the day of the Chadian presidential election, FACT attacked a Chadian border post in northern Chad just as polling stations were closing. In return, they were attacked by government forces.

On 17 April 2021, the British government said that two armed convoys from FACT were advancing towards the capital of N'Djamena. The Chadian army claimed they destroyed one FACT convoy in the province of Kanem while another was seen approaching the town of Mao.

On 20 April 2021, President Idriss Déby was fatally wounded by FACT gunfire on the front lines of the conflict, just over a week after he was re-elected President for a 6th term. A rebel spokesperson claimed that Déby was wounded in the village of Mele, near the town of Nokou, before being transported back to the capital, N'Djamena, where he succumbed to his injuries. General Mahamat Déby Itno, son of the deceased President, was declared the interim President as head of a military junta.

On 9 May 2021, the Chief of the General Staff of the Chad National Army, Abakar Abdelkerim Daoud, announced the army's victory over FACT. Crowds in N'Djamena reportedly cheered on as soldiers returned from the front line in a column of tanks and armored vehicles. At an army base in N'Djamena, dozens of captured FACT members were shown to the assembled press.
