= Allamaye Halina =

Chadian diplomat and statesman (born 1967)

- اللاماي هالينا
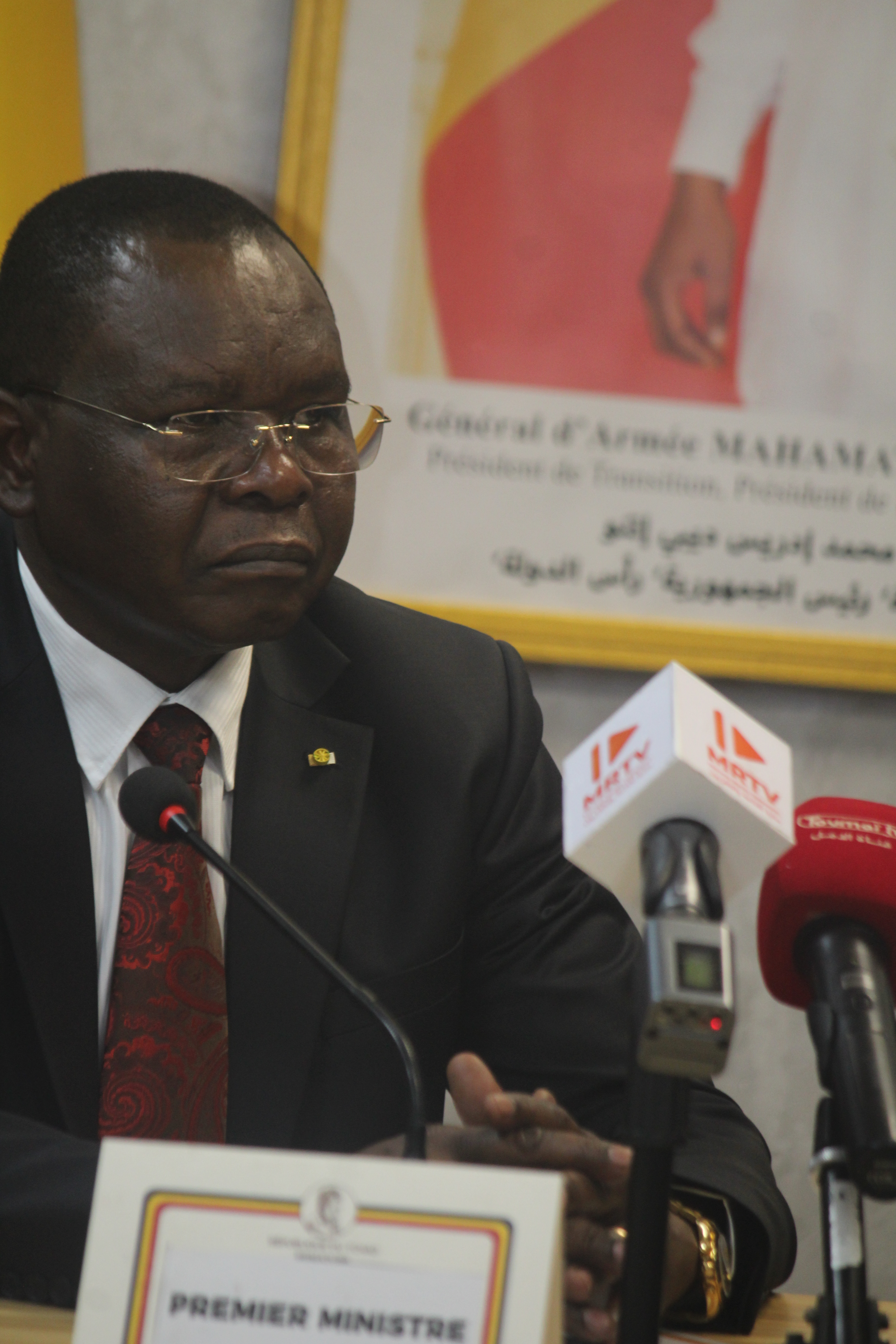
- Halina in 2024

Prime Minister of Chad
- Incumbent
- Assumed office 23 May 2024
- President: Mahamat Déby
- Preceded by: Succès Masra

Personal details
- Born: 1 January 1967 (age 59) Gounou Gaya, Chad
- Party: Independent
- Education: University of N'Djamena; International Relations Institute of Cameroon

Allamaye Halina (Arabic: اللاماي هالينا, born 1 January 1967), also known as Al-Lamaye Halina, is a Chadian diplomat and politician who has been prime minister of Chad since 2024.

== Early life and education ==
Allamaye Halina was born on 1 January 1967 in Gounou Gaya, Mayo-Kebbi Est. He graduated from the University of N'Djamena with a bachelor's degree in history and geography in 1992. He continued his postgraduate education at the International Relations Institute of Cameroon and obtained a master's degree in international relations.

== Political career ==
From 2008 to 2010, Halina was Director of Reception and Ceremonial Affairs at the Minister of Foreign Affairs. Halina was the Chief of Protocol for Chadian President Idriss Déby from February 2010 to 2023. On 31 January 2023, he was appointed as Chad's ambassador to China.

Prime Minister Succès Masra resigned in May 2024, after he was defeated by Mahamat Déby in the presidential election. Following the inauguration of Déby, Halina was designated as prime minister on 23 May. Upon his appointment as prime minister, several analysts described Halina as a technician without political ambition, who would not compete with Déby. Halina remained loyal to Déby for a long time, and Déby describes him as his "big brother."

On June 13, 2024, Halina presented his political program to the National Transitional Council. Among the important issues, he particularly hopes that by 2034, Chad will become independent in terms of energy and organize the African Cup of Nations football tournament. Halina also announces his desire to open dry ports and free zones.

== Personal life ==
His book, From Bedouin to President, was published in 2024.

== Works cited ==
- "Chad's Deby sworn in as president as Allamaye Halina named new PM". Al Jazeera English. 24 May 2024. Archived from the original on 27 June 2025.
