= 1990 Chadian coup d'état =

Overthrow of Hissène Habré

- Part of Chadian-Libyan conflict
Date	30 November 1990 – 1 December 1990
Location	N'Djamena, Chad 12°8′N 15°3′E
Result	Coup attempt succeeds.: MPS victory.; Hissène Habré ousted.; Idriss Déby took power.

Belligerents
Government (surrendered): Chadian National Armed Forces	MPS rebels
	Supported by: Libya; Sudan

Commanders and leaders
Hissène Habré	Idriss Déby; Bada Abbas Maldoum
- Nexus of coup attempt in N'Djamena (marked green), Chad

The 1990 Chadian coup d'état took place on 1 December 1990 when the forces of the Patriotic Salvation Movement (MPS), a Libyan–backed rebel group under the leadership of General Idriss Déby, entered the Chadian capital N'Djamena unopposed. The MPS troops entered Chad by crossing the Sudanese border three weeks earlier.

Previously, on 1 December, authoritarian, Western backed President Hissène Habré, who had ruled the country since 1982, reportedly fled to neighboring Cameroon with his family, Cabinet and top aides as his military, the Chadian National Armed Forces (FANT), collapsed.

Idriss Deby would rule the country until his assassination in 2021.

== French position ==
Although France repeatedly supported the Habré government against local rebellions and Libyan attacks in the 1980s, the French government gave instructions to the 1,300 French troops stationed in Chad not to intervene in what it described as an internal conflict, with French Foreign Minister Roland Dumas saying in an apparent reference to France's traditional deep involvement in Françafrique, its former colonies in Africa:

The times have passed when France would pick governments or would change governments and would maintain others when it so wished.

Dumas said some 300 extra French troops were sent to Chad in recent days only to protect French citizens and maintain order. The French and the MPS troops immediately began disarming civilians and restoring order after rioting and looting swept through N'Djamena after the collapse of the Habré government.

== See also ==
- History of Chad
