= Mahamat Déby =

Leader of Chad since 2021

His Excellency; Marshal; Mahamat Déby
- محمد ديبي
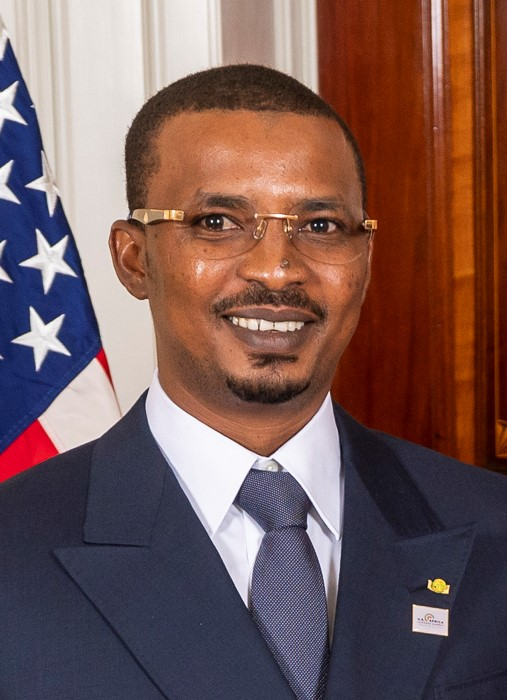
- Déby in 2022

President of Chad
- Incumbent
- Assumed office 10 October 2022 (Note: Transitional until 23 May 2024)
- Prime Minister: Albert Pahimi Padacké; Saleh Kebzabo; Succès Masra; Allamaye Halina
- Preceded by: Idriss Déby

Head of State of Chad (Note: Following his father's death in the 2021 Northern Chad offensive, Déby served as Chad's de facto head of state as the president of the Transitional Military Council, general commander and head of the New Chadian Administration until 10 October 2022, when he was appointed as transitional president by the National Sovereign Inclusive Dialogue.)
- De facto 20 April 2021 – 10 October 2022
- Prime Minister: Albert Pahimi Padacké
- Deputy: Djimadoum Tiraina
- Preceded by: Idriss Deby (as President)
- Succeeded by: Himself (as President)

President of the Transitional Military Council
- In office 20 April 2021 – 10 October 2022
- Vice President: Djimadoum Tiraina
- Preceded by: Position established
- Succeeded by: Position abolished

Personal details
- Born: 4 April 1984 (age 42) N'Djamena, Chad
- Party: MPS (since 2022)
- Spouse(s): Three wives, including Dahabaya Oumar Souni
- Children: 5
- Parent: Idriss Déby (father)
- Nickname: Kaka

Military service
- Allegiance: Chad
- Branch/service: Chadian Ground Forces
- Rank: Marshal
- Unit: Third Armoured Brigade; Fifth Air Brigade; Free Arab Volountiers
- Battles/wars: Second Chadian Civil War; Battle of Am Dam; Mali War; Battle of Ifoghas; Battle of Tighârghar; Insurgency in Northern Chad; Northern Chad offensive

Mahamat Idriss Déby Itno (Note: Arabic: محمد إدريس ديبي إتنو) (born 4 April 1984), also known by the nickname Kaka, is a Chadian politician and military officer who, under various titles, has been the leader of Chad since 2021. He is the son of Idriss Déby, who served as the sixth president of Chad from 1990 to 2021.

Born in N'Djamena, Déby was sent to military training in France. He first saw combat in 2006. In 2013, Déby went to Mali, where he was appointed second in command of the Chadian special forces in the country under general Oumar Bikimo. Déby led the army in February against rebels in the Adrar des Ifoghas mountains in northern Mali leading to the Battle of Ifoghas, where they eliminated a rebel base. After returning to Chad, Déby was appointed the director of the General Directorate of the Security Services of State Institutions (DGSSIE).

In April 2021, Déby's father, Idriss Déby, was killed by the Front for Change and Concord in Chad (FACT) in the Northern Chad offensive, shortly after his victory in the presidential election was announced. Mahamat was immediately proclaimed the new leader of Chad as president of the Transitional Military Council and promised a transition to a civilian government within the next 18 months. However, in October 2022, Déby extended his rule, dissolving the Transitional Military Council and being sworn in as transitional president. This led to protests on 20 October 2022 that left dozens dead. The government banned several opposition parties in response.

In 2024, after a constitutional referendum, Déby announced his candidacy for the presidential elections held on 6 May, with his biggest challenger being his prime minister, Succès Masra, whom Déby appointed prime minister on 1 January after Masra returned to the country before the referendum. Déby won with 61% of the vote, though the results were disputed by Masra and other opposition leaders. Masra eventually resigned as prime minister and Déby was subsequently inaugurated president on 23 May, marking the official extension of his family's 34-year rule over the country, which began with Déby's father taking power in the 1990 coup.

Several international media sources and human rights organisations have described Mahamat Déby as an authoritarian leader who has continued the system of rule established by his father. Human Rights Watch stated that, like his father, Mahamat Déby rules Chad with an iron fist, citing killings, arbitrary arrests, torture and the suppression of dissent following the 2021 military takeover. Analysts have characterised the post-2021 period as the continuation of an autocratic system, marked by violent repression of protests, restrictions on the opposition, control of electoral institutions, and the disputed 2024 presidential election that extended the family's multi-decade hold on power.

== Early life and military career ==
Mahamat Déby was born on 4 April 1984, as the son of Idriss Déby, who was then commander-in-chief of the Chadian Ground Forces, and a Gourane mother.

Déby first enrolled at the Joint Grouping of military schools in Chad. He subsequently received training in France, at the military school of Aix-en-Provence. Upon his return he was enrolled in second promotion of semi direct of the school of officer inter arme and later was appointed to the service branch of the Security of State Institutions (DGSSIE), as a deputy commander of its infantry group. His first combat experience took place in April 2006 when rebels attacked the capital city of Chad and he later participated in combat in eastern Chad along with General Abu Bakr al Said, then director of police, Mahamat was given the rank of major afterward. In May 2009, he was made brigadier general and he shared command of Chadian forces during the Battle of Am Dam, where the army defeated the rebels.

Following his victory, he was appointed in command of the armored squadrons and bodyguards of the SERS. In January 2013, he was appointed second in command of the Chadian special forces in Mali under general Oumar Bikimo. On 22 February, he led his army against rebels in the Adrar des Ifoghas mountains in northern Mali leading to the Battle of Ifoghas. They eliminated a rebel base said to be of "significant importance", inflicting heavy losses upon the rebels but also losing twenty-six men in the process, including Abdel Aziz Hassane Adam, a commander of special forces. Mahamat took full command of the Chadian Intervention in Northern Mali (FATIM) and has since been leading operations against rebels in the North. In 2014 he worked alongside the French military during Operation Serval.

In 2014 he was appointed as director of the General Directorate of the Security Services of State Institutions (DGSSIE), a presidential guard and special forces organization that replaced the former Chadian Republican Guard and reports directly to the head of state.

== Leadership of Chad ==
=== President of the Transitional Military Council ===
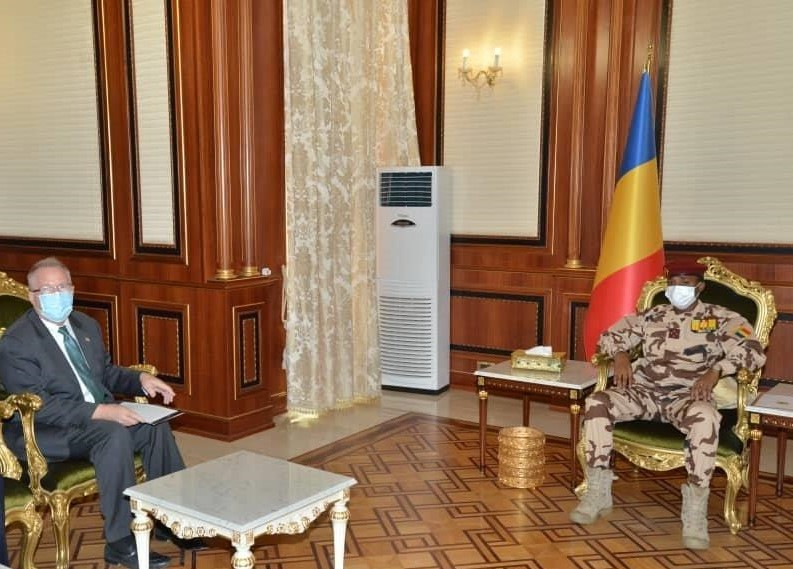
Mahamat Déby meeting David R. Gilmour in 2021 to discuss U.S. support for a transition of power to a democratically elected government

After Mahamat's father, Idriss Déby, died at the hands of FACT on 20 April 2021, the military announced that the elected government and National Assembly had been dissolved and that a Transitional Military Council led by Mahamat will lead the nation for 18 months. A new charter replaced the Constitution of Chad, making Mahamat the interim President and head of the armed forces.

Some political actors within Chad labeled the installing of the transitional military government a coup, as the constitutional provisions regarding the filling of a presidential vacancy were not followed. Namely, according to the constitution, the President of the National Assembly, Haroun Kabadi, should have been named Acting President after president Idriss Déby's death, and an early election called within a period of no less than 45 and no more than 90 days from the time of the vacancy. France, one of Chad's main foreign policy allies, defended the development as necessary, citing the "exceptional circumstances" caused by the rebellion. The broader international community also supported Déby, seeing him as a stable foothold in the Sahel. Déby was welcomed to Washington, D.C., as a part of a summit for African leaders. Despite this recognition, FACT rebels have issued an open threat to the new government, stating that "Chad is not a monarchy" and vowing to continue fighting until they reach N'Djamena and depose Mahamat Déby from power.

==== National dialogue ====
After initially refusing to negotiate with insurgent groups, Déby softened his stance in August 2021, proposing a national dialogue. After his proposal was met with approval by rebel groups, peace talks between government and rebel representatives started two months later. These peace talks culminated in the 8 August 2022 peace agreement, signed in Doha, which established a national dialogue between Déby's government and the opposition, intended to prepare the country for elections scheduled for the second half of 2022. The peace agreement, though, was rejected by FACT and other opposition groups, as well as by civil society groups, who cited the absence of a guaranteed return to civilian rule. This lack of support for the peace agreement led to limited participation in the national dialogue. Without major opposition and civilian participation in the national dialogue, it concluded to extend the transition and postpone elections until at least October 2024. In March 2023, Déby pardoned 380 jailed FACT members, many of whom were among the 400+ sentenced to life in prison for the death of his father, in an attempt to have the group join peace talks, following their non-participation in the national dialogue.

==== Economy ====
In July 2021, he tapped Qatar for reconciliation and economic operations in the nation of Chad. Under his administration Chad's gross domestic product grew by 1.1% in 2021 and 2.4% in 2022.

==== Boko Haram ====
On 22 November 2022, an attack was launched by Boko Haram in the village of Ngouboua, killing at least 10 soldiers of the Chad National Army. Déby had previously stated that the organization had been attacking civilians with increased frequency, as they "no longer [had] the strength to hit bases". Despite significant territorial losses, Boko Haram has adapted by shifting to asymmetric tactics such as ambushes and suicide bombings, continuing to target both military and civilian sites in the Lake Chad region.

==== 2022 Chad floods ====
In 2022, normal rainfalls occurred across Central Africa and West Africa between July and August. In mid-August, floods began in Chad, killing 22 people. An estimated 442,000 people were displaced and a state of emergency was declared.

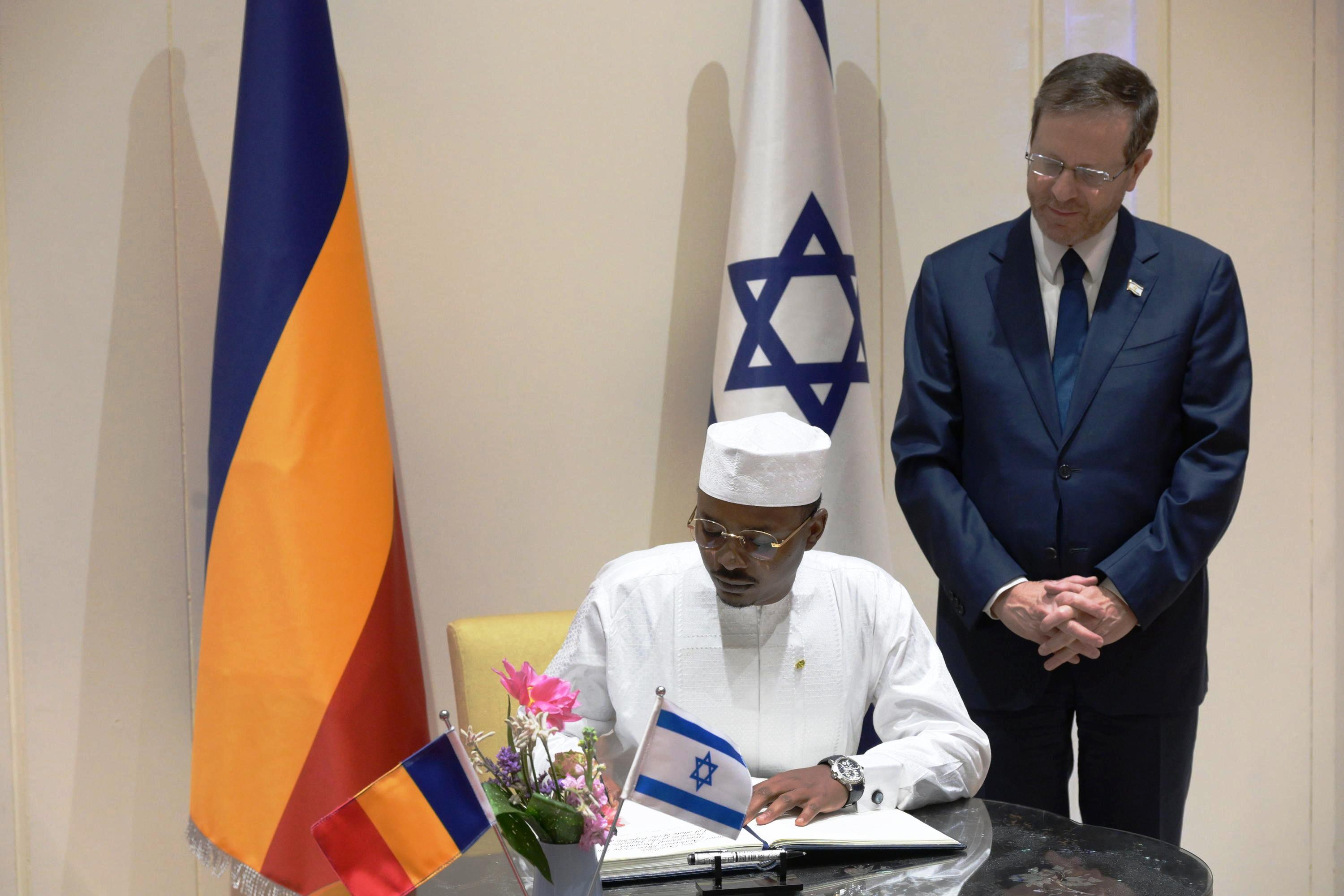
Déby with Israeli President Isaac Herzog in Jerusalem, February 2023

=== October 2022 protests ===
The Transitional Military Council's 3 October postponing of elections was met with significant pro-democracy demonstrations on 20 October, the initial date of elections. These demonstrations primarily took place in the cities of N'Djamena and Moundou, and were primarily orchestrated by the opposition group Wakit Tamma and Succès Masra, leader of the Les Transformateurs party. In response to the demonstrations, government security forces violently cracked down on protesters and the government orchestrated a days long internet blackout. The violence ended in the deaths of between 50 and 200, including journalist Orédjé Narcisse, and the arrests of at least 600. Of those 600+, 342 ended up sentenced to between 1 and 3 years in prison for charges related to the protests. The day was later deemed "Black Thursday" for the violence. Following the demonstrations, Déby blamed protesters and organizers for the violence, and justified the government response by claiming the protests were an organized insurrection. Following the protests, various opposition political parties were suspended, among them Les Transformateurs and the Chadian Socialist Party.

=== French support ===
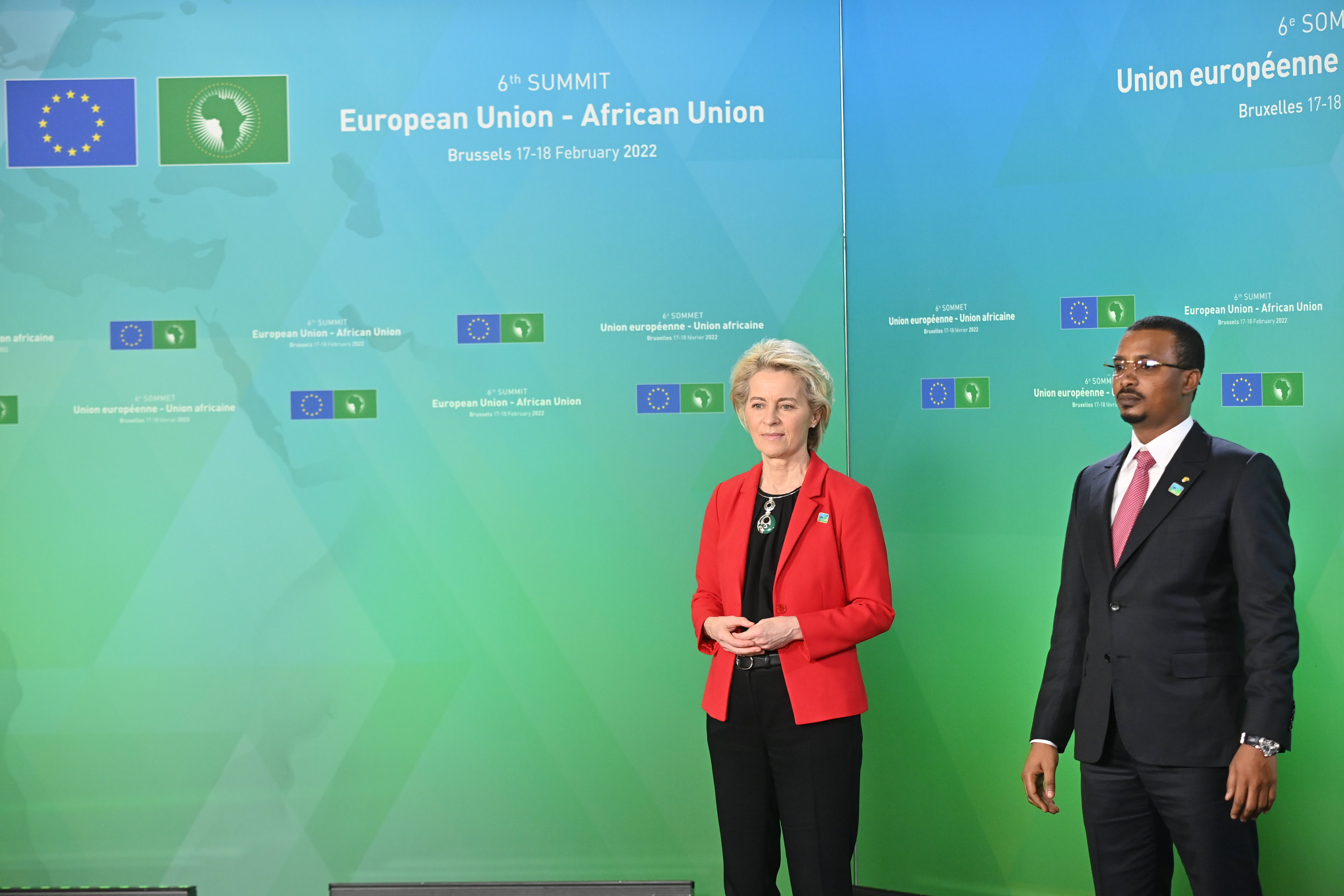
Déby with European Commission President Ursula von der Leyen in Brussels, February 2022

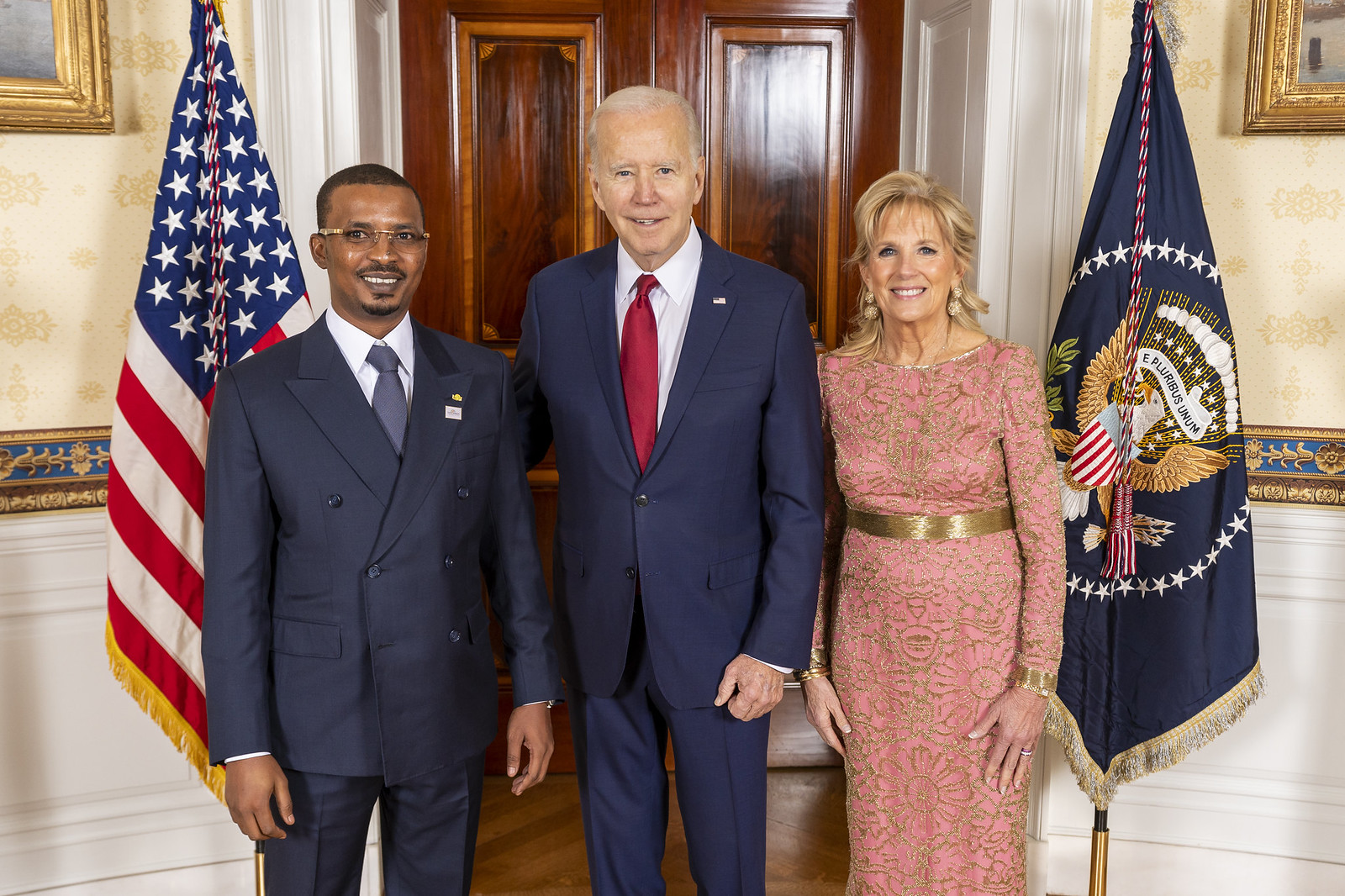
Déby with US President Joe Biden in Washington, D.C., December 2022

Déby has received significant support in the West, most notably from France, its former colonial power. Emmanuel Macron attended the funeral of Idriss Déby, where he pledged his support for the junior Déby's government and for the stability of Chad, stability which France further supported through Operation Barkhane, which positioned a 5,000+ French force in the Sahel, with their headquarters in Chad. Déby also visited Macron at the Élysée Palace in June 2021, where the two discussed the political transition in Chad. Despite the 2021 termination of Operation Barkhane, France has not demonstrated any wavering in their support of Déby and continues to position troops in the region, despite having moved the remaining core of their Sahel forces to Niger.

In January 2024, a preliminary investigation was opened by the National Financial Prosecutor's office in France (PNF), for embezzlement of public funds and concealment "concerning the clothing expenses" of Déby in Paris.

=== Civilian presidency ===
On 13 January 2024, Déby was announced as the nominee of the Patriotic Salvation Movement for the 2024 Chadian presidential election by party secretary Mahamat Zene Bada. After a raid on the home of his main opponent, Yaya Dillo Djérou, by government forces on 28 February 2021 in which five of his relatives were killed, three other candidates had withdrawn in protest and fear of similar consequences. The attack was condemned by the African Union, while French Minister for Europe and Foreign Affairs Jean-Yves Le Drian called for an impartial investigation into the incident. Yaya Dillo Djérou was killed by security forces three years later, on 28 February 2024.

On 9 May, Déby was declared the winner of the 2024 election by the National Elections Management Agency (ANGE). According to ANGE, Déby won 61.3% of the vote while his chief opponent, Prime Minister Succès Masra, won 18.53%. Just prior to the announcement, Masra claimed victory on Facebook, stating that he won a "resounding victory". The results of the election were announced two weeks earlier than expected.

Déby was sworn in as elected president on 23 May. He appointed Allamaye Halina as prime minister following Masra's resignation on 22 May.

On 9 December 2024, the National Transitional Council elevated Déby to the rank of Marshal of Chad. 160 members voted to adopt the resolution against 2 while 6 abstained in a council.

On 21 January 2025, his brother Adam attacked him in an open letter, calling on him in particular to resign. Mahamat rejected the demands.

On 5 June 2025, Déby ordered the suspension of visa issuances to US nationals in retaliation for the entry ban on Chadian citizens imposed by US president Donald Trump the previous day.

In response to the death of Supreme Leader Ali Khamenei following strikes by Israel and the United States, Déby expressed solidarity with Iran, sharing in the "pain of the Iranian nation".

== Personal life ==
Déby is polygamous and has three wives. His first wife is an ethnic Zaghawa woman. In 2010, Déby married his second wife, a Central African woman and the daughter of Abakar Sabone—a former Central African Republic government minister, advisor to Michel Djotodia, and leader of the Movement of Central African Liberators for Justice rebel group. It is believed that Déby and his second wife have five children.

His third wife, Dahabaya Oumar Souni, is a journalist and media advisor who is considered the First Lady of Chad. Souni worked closely with Idriss Déby and was promoted to director of public relations for the office of the presidency from December 2019 until the elder Déby's death. In May 2021, Dahabaya Oumar Souni was appointed as media advisor to the presidency of the Transitional Military Council and now works alongside her husband Mahamat as a member of his group of technical advisors.

== Awards ==
- 2026 – African Peace Prize

== See also ==
- List of current heads of state and government
- List of heads of the executive by approval rating
- Military of Chad

== Notes ==
Political offices
Preceded by Idriss Déby	President of Chad (Transitional until 2024); 2021–present	Succeeded by Incumbent
