= Transitional Military Council (Chad) =

Military junta ruling Chad from 2021 to 2022

The Transitional Military Council (French: Conseil militaire de transition, CMT; Arabic: المجلس العسكري الانتقالي, al-Majlis al-‘askarī al-intiqālī) was a military junta that ruled Chad from 2021 to 2022. The junta announced the death of President Idriss Déby on 20 April 2021, and declared that it would take charge of the government of Chad and continue hostilities against rebels of the Front for Change and Concord in Chad (FACT) in the north of the country. It was chaired by Mahamat Idriss Déby, the son of the late President, making him the de facto President of Chad. It was dissolved on 10 October 2022, following a "national dialogue" that named Déby as the Transitional President and replaced the CMT with a transitional administration appointed by him.

== History ==
=== Announcement of formation ===
On 20 April 2021, the spokesman of the CMT, General Azem Bermandoa Agouna, announced its formation on state television, after the death of the former president Idriss Déby in combat against FACT rebels. On the same day, Mahamat Idriss Déby named 15 generals, including himself who will be part of the Council and 14 others who were loyalists to his father. It said that the Council would take power for eighteen months, after which elections will be held.

=== Reaction to formation ===
On 22 April 2021, the Union des syndicats du Tchad (Union of Trade Unions of Chad) called for a general strike. It was also reported that some officers in the army were opposed to the coup. The junta successfully suppressed protests. Hostilities against the FACT continued, but the CMT said on 6 May that it had successfully repelled them.

=== Transitional charter and government ===
Reuters reported that the Council has replaced the Constitution of Chad with a new charter, granting Mahamat the interim presidency and making him the leader of the armed forces. On 27 April the CMT announced the formation of a transitional government led by the civilian politician Albert Pahimi Padacké. France expressed its support for a 'civilian-military transition' on 23 April.

The African Union's members were divided on sanctions: whilst its rules require them, other members expressed concerns because of Chad's importance in fighting terrorism. Eventually the AU sent a delegation to Chad. At a meeting held on 12 May, a report to the Peace and Security Council of the African Union proposed three options. The first option was to fully support the CMT whilst sending an envoy to hold the military to its promise to hold elections within 18 months. The second was to demand equal power sharing with a civilian government. The third was to demand power should be handed over to a civilian government, with a military vice-president appointed for security matters. The report said that the transitional charter was ‘wholly inadequate’ and urged a redrafting of the constitution. It further proposed the demobilisation of rebel forces and their participation in talks; that prospect had previously been rejected by the CMT. The report was criticised by Delphine Djiraibé of the Public Interest Legal Centre, who criticised the delay in releasing the report and its failure to recommend sanctions. The African Union appointed a special envoy to Chad, implying adoption of the first option, but he was initially refused because the Chadian government claimed that they had not been consulted about his appointment.

== Members ==
The following are members of the CMT.

- Mahamat Déby Itno (President)
- Djimadoum Tiraina (Vice-President)
- Bichara Issa Djadalla
- Oki Mahamat Yaya Dagache
- Mahamat Ismaïl Chaïbo
- Souleyman Abakar Adoum
- Taher Erda Tairo
- Azem Bermandoa
- Amine Ahmat Idriss
- Gamane Mokhtar
- Saleh Ben Haliki
- Abakar Abdelkerim Daoud
- Ahmat Youssouf Mahamat Itno
- Mahamat Souleyman
- Gueile Hemchi

== See also ==
- Military of Chad
- Patriotic Salvation Movement
- Idriss Déby
