= Gun language =

Language spoken in West Africa

Gun
- gungbe
- Native to: Benin, Nigeria
- Ethnicity: Gun people
- Native speakers: 1.5 million (2020–2021)
- Language family: Niger–Congo?: Atlantic–Congo; Volta-Congo; Kwa; Gbe; Fon; Gun
- Writing system: Latin

Official status
- Official language in: Benin

Language codes
- ISO 639-3: guw
- Glottolog: gunn1250

Video in Gun language introducing Gungbe Wikipedia

Gun (Gun: gungbe) is a language in the Gbe languages group. It is spoken by the Ogu people in Benin, as well as in south-western Nigeria. Gun is part of the Fon dialectal cluster within the Eastern Gbe languages; it is close to other Fon dialects, especially its Agbome and Kpase varieties, as well as to the Mahi and Weme (Ouémé) languages. It is used in some schools in the Ouémé Department of Benin.

Gun is the second most spoken language in Benin. It is mainly spoken in the south of the country, in Porto-Novo, Sèmè-Kpodji, Bonou, Adjarra, Avrankou, Dangbo, Akpro-Missérété, Cotonou, and other cities where Ogu people live. It is also spoken by a minority of Ogu people in southwest Nigeria near the border with Benin, particularly Badagry, Maun, Tube.

== Phonology ==
=== Consonants ===
		Bilabial	Labio- dental	Laminal- alveolar	(Post-) alveolar	Palatal	Labial- velar	Velar	Uvular	Glottal
Nasal		m ~ b			n ~ ɖ	(ɲ)				
Plosive/ Affricate	voiced	m ~ b		d	n ~ ɖ	d͡ʒ	ɡ͡b	ɡ		
Plosive/ Affricate	voiceless	(p)		t		t͡ʃ	k͡p	k		
Fricative	voiceless	f ~ ɸ		s		(ʃ)	xʷ	x ~ χ ~ h		
Fricative	voiced	v ~ β		z		(ʒ)	ɣʷ	ɣ ~ ʁ		
Approximant					l ~ l̃	j [j̃]	w [w̃]			
Trill					(r ~ r̃)					
Tap					(ɾ)					

- Voiced plosives /b, ɖ/ fluctuate to voiced nasals [m, n] exclusively before nasal vowels, however; as a result of more recent loanwords, /b, ɖ/ also tend to not fluctuate when preceding nasal vowels.
- In the case of the sounds /x ~ χ ~ h/, /ɣ ~ ʁ/; /f ~ ɸ/, /v ~ β/; /tʃ ~ ʃ/, /dʒ ~ ʒ/; these sounds are strictly realizations of individual sounds due to dialectal variation, and not as contrasting phonemes.
- /p/ is mainly phonemic as a result of loanwords and ideophonic terms.
- /ɖ/ is heard as a tap [ɾ] when in intervocalic position and followed by an oral vowel.
- /j/ when occurring before nasal vowels can be heard as either [ɲ] or [j̃] in free variation. /l, w/ are nasalized as [l̃, w̃] when before nasal vowels.
- /l/ is also realized as a trill [r] when occurring after laminal alveolars, palato-alveolars, and palatal consonants. It may also be nasalized as [r̃] when before nasal vowels in that position.

=== Vowels ===
	Front	Central	Back
Close	i ĩ		u ũ
Close-mid	e		o
Open-mid	ɛ ɛ̃		ɔ ɔ̃
Open		a ã	

== Orthography ==
The language has been written with three orthographies, all of them based on the Latin alphabet. In Nigeria, it has been written with an orthography similar to that of Yoruba and some other languages of Nigeria, and using the dot below diacritic to indicate sounds. In Benin, another orthography was developed for publishing a Bible translation in 1923, and it was updated in 1975, and is now used for teaching literacy in some schools in Benin; it is similar to the orthography of Fon, using letters such as ⟨ɛ⟩ and ⟨ɔ⟩. There are proposals to unify the orthographies, for example the one made by Hounkpati Capo in 1990.

Benin Gun alphabet
a	b	c	d	ɖ	e	ɛ	f	g	gb	h	hw	i	j	k	kp	l
m	n	ny	o	ɔ	p	r	s	t	u	v	w	x	xw	y	z	

== Bibliography ==
- Saulnier, Pierre (1968). Manuel progressif de conversation en langue goun. Porto-Novo : Centre Catéchétique.
- Aboh, Enoch (1996). "A propos de la syntaxe du Gungbe". Rivista di Grammatica Generativa. Archived from the original on 11 November 2021.
