= Vakon =

Coordinates: 6°31′N 2°34′E

- Arrondissement
- Interactive map of Vakon
- Country: Benin
- Department: Ouémé Department
- Commune: Akpro-Missérété

Population (2002)
  - Total: 20,541
- Time zone: UTC+1 (WAT)

Vakon is an arrondissement in the Ouémé department of Benin. It is an administrative division under the jurisdiction of the commune of Akpro-Missérété. According to the population census conducted by the Institut National de la Statistique Benin on February 15, 2002, the arrondissement had a total population of 20,541.
