= Geology of Benin =

The geology of Benin in West Africa includes the north-northeast trending Proterozoic Dahomeyide orogen in the north and a range of Cretaceous to Holocene sedimentary rocks in the south, separated very closely by the 7th latitude. Neogene alluvial deposits extend across Benin’s northeastern border with Niger. In the Togo and Benin regions, the following rock types have been identified: metasandstones, schists, metasilexites, metasiltstones, metaconglomerates, metatillites, carbonate rocks or marbles, ultramafic rocks, metajaspillites, metahematites, quartzites, quartz schists, micaschists, gneisses, migmatites, amphibolites, granites, charnockites, eclogites, metabasalts, calc-silicate rocks and pyroxenites.

== Economic geology ==
In northwestern Benin, gold is mineralized in conglomerates of quartzite of the Togo Group. In addition to artisanal gold mining, geological materials for industry and construction are mined. In Goumpere, nickel, copper, chromium, and cobalt have been detected by the observance of geochemical anomalies. Additionally, 123 million tons of limestone have been observed in the Oueme district which could be used for cement and lime. There is also 33 million tons of sandstone available that could be used for ballast. Uranium and iron ore have been discovered in the region as well.

Benin has been extracting crude oil since the 1990s, the majority of which comes from the Seme Field. More onshore exploration continues. There is an estimated 1.09 Mt of crude petroleum and 1.1 billion m^{3} of natural gas.
