= Faissol Gnonlonfin =

Beninese film director and producer (born 1985)

- Born: 1985 (age 40–41); Hozin
- Occupations: Film director and producer
- Notable work: Obalé le chasseur (2012)

Faissol Fahad Bolade Gnonlonfin (born 1985) is a Beninese film director and producer.

== Biography ==
Gnonlonfin was born in the village of Hozin in Western Benin and initially studied scientific and technical fields. In 2006, he entered the newly opened Institut supérieur des métiers de l'audiovisuel et du cinéma (ISMA), a film school in Cotonou, in order to improve his skills in directing and filmmaking. After three years at the institute, Gnonlonfin travelled through several countries and completed internships, serving as an assistant director for several documentaries through the French program Africadoc. In order to learn more about documentary making, he studied at Abdou Moumouni University, receiving a master's degree in Audiovisual and Creative Documentary. Gnonlonfin later earned a master's degree in film production at the Stendhal University in France.

In 2012, Gnonlonfin made his first feature picture, Obalé le chasseur, depicting a Beninese villager joining a group of hunters. He studied the subject for two years and takes a look at the debate between traditional hunters and wildlife preservationists. According to former teacher Jean-François Hautin, a white man could not have effectively filmed the ceremony of hunters. Gnonlonfin's second film Ni ici ni ailleur examines the movement against the exploitation of shale gas in Ardèche, linking it with resource extraction in Africa.

After focusing his attention on documentaries, many of which received awards, Gnonlonfin began making fictional works in 2014. In 2017, he collaborated with Berni Goldblat and the production company Les Films du Djabadjah on Wallay. It was released to great acclaim, being nominated for the Carthage Film Festival 2017. In March 2018, Gnonlonfin led a film production workshop in Burkina Faso.

Gnonlonfin founded the production company Merveilles Production to encourage young filmmakers. He lives mainly in France but spends roughly two months a year in Benin.
