= 2008 Benin floods =

Multiple floods in Benin in 2008

The 2008 Benin floods struck the nation of Benin between July and October 2008, and affected the other West African nations of Burkina Faso, Mali, Mauritania, Niger and Togo. According to the Red Cross of Benin, the flooding in Benin initially affected almost 7,000 people, including the displacement of 1,560 children. and by 19 August 2008 the World Health Organization (WHO) estimated that the flooding had displaced at least 150,000 people. Some 500,000 people in total were at risk of additional flooding.

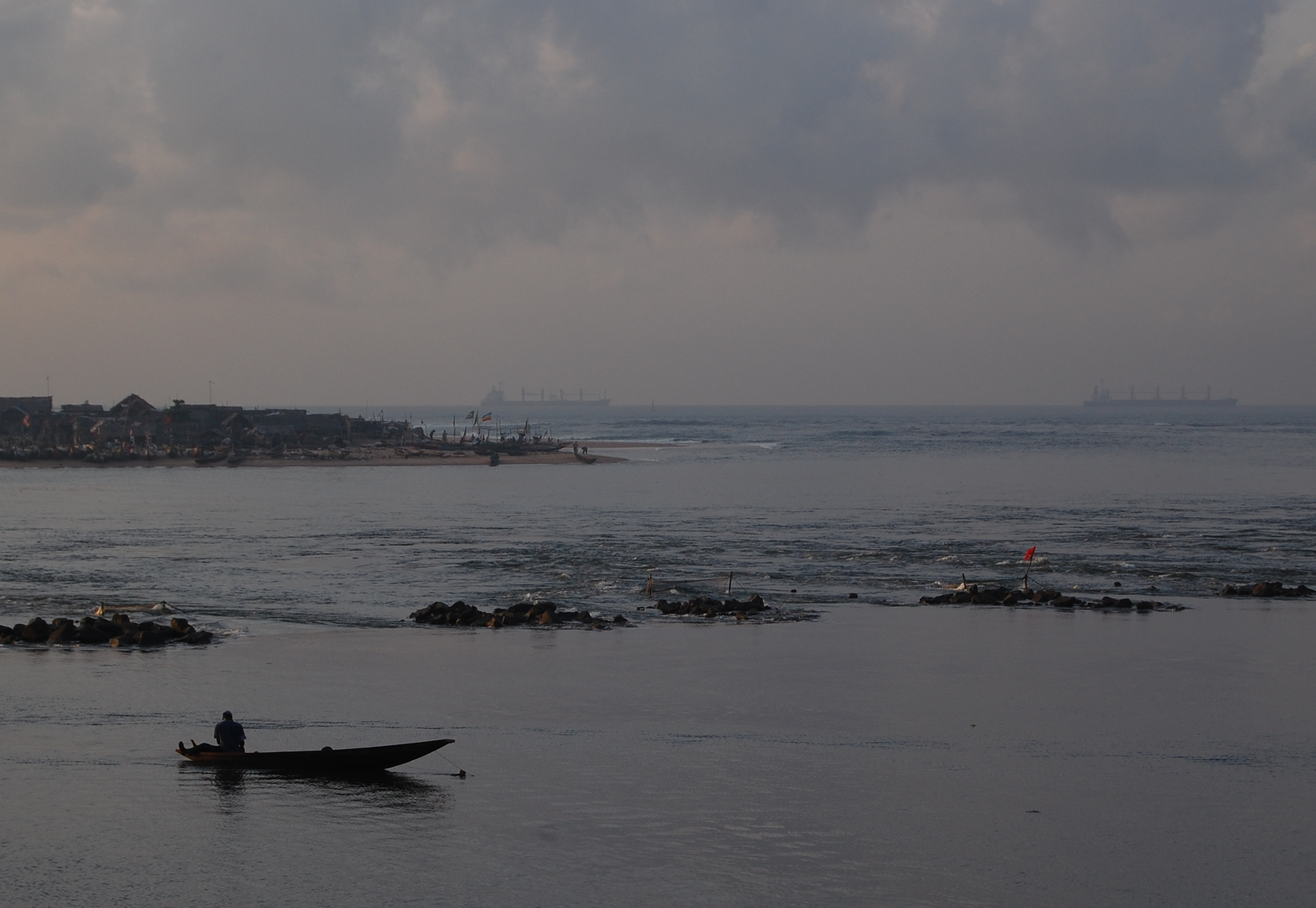
The Ouémé River as it flows into the Atlantic Ocean in Cotonou

== Flooding ==
The Mono River and Ouémé River which flows down through central Benin into the economic capital of Cotonou on the coast in particular was a problem. Weeks after the initial flooding in July 2008, many areas of Cotonou were still not drained, posing a serious risk to health given that the flooding affected many densely populated areas and some 10% of the nation's population live in the city. Representatives from the municipal council of Cotonou, WHO’s Cotonou office and the Benin’s Ministry of Hygiene, Public Health and Social Affairs, urged on 15 August 2008 that an evacuation and relocation plan was required given that heavier storms were expected in September and October.

On 15 September 2008 reports broke out that the commune of Adjohoun had been seriously affected by the flooding of the Ouémé River. The area, which is a fertile agricultural valley, threatened the livelihoods of some 57,000 people. The flooding had begun as in other places in late July but storms in early September struck the region worse. More than 25,000 hectares of crop land was inundated, killing some 30,000 animals and flooding 18,000 homes in the commune. Approximately 2,000 people were displaced in the communities of Azowlissé, Dèmè, Gangban, Kogé and Togbota with the exception of Awonou, located further away from the river. According to one council official, while Benin often experiences flooding, notably in 1995 and 2007, the floods of 2008 were particularly devastating on the livelihoods of the Beninois people, "People cannot even eat three times a day now. Even to find food once a day is a headache. Normally, agricultural products are bought and sold here at decent prices. But now things have changed." The regional mayor of Adjohoun, Gerard Adounsiba, requested a national funding appeal to provide food and medical in what was according to him, "the largest humanitarian crisis in the region to date." The situation was made worse by the fact that the hospitals in the area were affected by flooding. Livelihoods of local fisherman which depend upon the river were also severely affected.

== Response ==
Part of the problem with the flooding was that few who succumbed to the flooding were unwilling to evacuate their homes in Cotonou. The district of Vossa was completely inundated in flood water and a disaster relief team from WHO had to be sent into Ayelawadje district of the city whilst UN agencies collaborated with the Cotonou government to pump out water and clear roads in the capital. Since 30 July 2008 the World Health Organization reported 192 cases of cholera in Cotonou and helped fund US$20,000 towards the government’s cholera treatment efforts. According to Dr. Eric Laroche, Assistant Director-General of WHO, "West Africa's annual floods bring with them not only the threat of vector-borne and communicable diseases, but it further endangers the lives of people already malnourished by the food price crisis." The flooding increased the risk of Meningitis and yellow fever as well as posing a threat to an estimated 5 million people living with HIV/AIDS in West Africa. Malaria, diarrhoeal and respiratory infections, and malnutrition posed a threat to the population living along the river basins.
