= Dekin =

Dekin may refer to:

- Dékin, Benin
- Dikin, Iran

== See also ==
- Decene, a hydrocarbon
