= Azowlissé =

Azowlissé Azaourissè
- Arrondissement and town
- Location in Benin
- Coordinates: 6.667°N 2.492°E
- Country: Benin
- Department: Ouémé Department
- Commune: Adjohoun
- Arrondissement: Azowlissé
- Time zone: UTC+1 (WAT)

Azowlissé or Azaourissè is a small town and arrondissement located in the commune of Adjohoun in the Ouémé Department of Benin. Agriculture is the main industry of the fertile Ouémé River valley in the area. During the 2008 Benin floods, the area was affected by the flooding of the Ouémé River which affected much of Adjohoun commune.
