= Idriss Déby =

President of Chad from 1991 to 2021

- إدريس ديبي
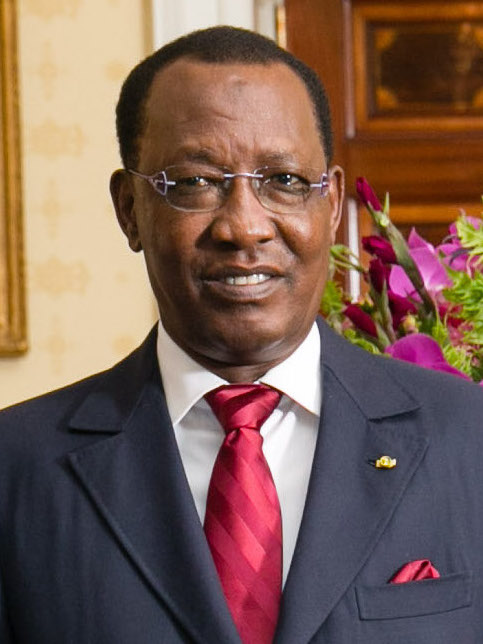
- Déby in 2014

President of Chad
- In office 28 February 1991 – 20 April 2021 (Note: Transitional: 2 December 1990 – 28 February 1991)
- Prime Minister: See list: Jean Alingué Bawoyeu; Joseph Yodoyman; Fidèle Moungar; Delwa Kassiré Koumakoye; Koibla Djimasta; Nassour Guelendouksia Ouaido; Nagoum Yamassoum; Haroun Kabadi; Moussa Faki; Pascal Yoadimnadji; Adoum Younousmi; Delwa Kassiré Koumakoye; Youssouf Saleh Abbas; Emmanuel Nadingar; Djimrangar Dadnadji; Kalzeubet Pahimi Deubet; Albert Pahimi Padacké
- Vice President: Bada Abbas Maldoum (1990–1991)
- Preceded by: Hissène Habré
- Succeeded by: Mahamat Déby

Chairperson of the African Union
- In office 30 January 2016 – 30 January 2017
- Preceded by: Robert Mugabe
- Succeeded by: Alpha Condé

Personal details
- Born: 18 June 1952 Fada, French Equatorial Africa (now Chad)
- Died: 20 April 2021 (aged 68) N'Djamena, Chad
- Cause of death: Died of wounds
- Resting place: Amdjarass
- Party: MPS
- Spouses: Zina Wazouna Ahmed Idriss (divorced) Hadja Halimé (divorced) Hinda Déby Itno (m. 2005) Amani Musa Hilal (m. 2012)
- Relations: Timane Erdimi (nephew)
- Children: Mahamat; Brahim
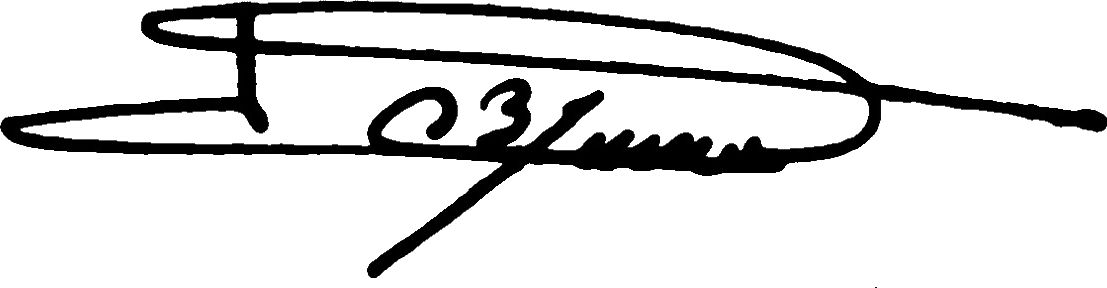
- Signature

Military service
- Allegiance: Chad
- Branch/service: Chadian Ground Forces
- Years of service: 1976–2021
- Rank: Marshal
- Battles/wars: First Chadian Civil War; Chadian–Libyan War; Toyota War; Battle of Maaten al-Sarra; Chadian–Nigerian War; 1990 Chadian coup d'état; Second Congo War; Second Chadian Civil War; Battle of N'Djamena (2006); Battle of Massaguet; Battle of N'Djamena (2008); Battle of Am Zoer; Battle of Am Dam; Insurgency in Northern Chad; 2021 Northern Chad offensive †

Idriss Déby Itno (Arabic: إدريس ديبي إتنو Idrīs Daybī Itnū; 18 June 1952 – 20 April 2021) was a Chadian politician and military officer who was the president of Chad from 1991 until his death in 2021 during the Northern Chad offensive. His term of 30 years makes him Chad's longest-serving president.

Déby was a member of the Bidayat clan of the Zaghawa ethnic group. A high-ranking commander of President Hissène Habré's military during the 1980s, Déby played important roles in the Toyota War which led to Chad's victory during the Chadian-Libyan War. He was later purged by Habré after being suspected of plotting a coup, and was forced into exile in Libya. He took power by leading a coup d'état against Habré in December 1990 and was immediately proclaimed transitional president, whom Déby served until he was officially proclaimed president on 28 February 1991. Despite introducing a multi-party system in 1992 after several decades of one-party rule under his predecessors, throughout his presidency, Déby's party, the Patriotic Salvation Movement (MPS) was the dominant party. Déby won presidential elections in 1996 and 2001, and after term limits were eliminated he won again in 2006, 2011, 2016, and 2021.

During the Second Congo War, Déby briefly ordered military intervention on the side of the Congolese government but soon withdrew when his forces were accused of looting and human rights abuses. In the early 2000s, oil was discovered in Chad, and Déby made petroleum production the driving force of the country's economy. He survived various rebellions and coup attempts against his rule, including a rebellion led by his former defense minister Youssouf Togoïmi from 1998 to 2002 as well as a civil war from 2005 to 2010 provoked by the refugee crisis of the War in Darfur in neighboring Sudan.

Several international media sources have described Déby as authoritarian. During his three decades in office, Chad experienced democratic backsliding, as well as widespread corruption, including cronyism, embezzlement, and a deeply entrenched patronage system. In 2016, the Front for Change and Concord in Chad (FACT) was established with the goal of overthrowing Déby's government. In April 2021, FACT initiated the Northern Chad offensive; Déby was injured on 19 April while commanding troops on the frontline fighting the militants and died the following day.

== Early life ==
Déby was born on 18 June 1952, in the village of Berdoba, approximately 190 kilometers from Fada in northern Chad. His father was a herdsman of the Bidayat clan of the Zaghawa community. After attending the Qur'anic School in Tiné, Déby studied at the École Française in Fada and at the Franco-Arab school (Lycée Franco-Arabe) in Abéché. He also attended the Lycée Jacques Moudeina in Bongor and held a bachelor's degree in science.

After finishing school, he entered the Officers' School in N'Djamena. From there he was sent to France for training, returning to Chad in 1976 with a professional pilot certificate. He remained loyal to the army and President Félix Malloum even after Chad's central authority crumbled in 1979. He returned from France in February 1979 and found Chad had become a battleground for many armed groups. Déby tied his fortunes to those of Hissène Habré, one of the chief Chadian warlords. A year after Habré became president in 1982, Déby was made commander-in-chief of the army.

He distinguished himself in 1984 by destroying pro-Libyan forces in eastern Chad. In 1985, Habré sent him to Paris to attend a course at the École de Guerre and upon his return in 1986, he was made chief military advisor to the president. In 1987, he confronted Libyan forces on the field, with the help of France in the so-called "Toyota War", adopting tactics that inflicted heavy losses on Libyan forces. During the war, he also led a raid on Maaten al-Sarra Air Base in Kufrah, in Libyan territory. A rift emerged on 1 April 1989 between Habré and Déby over the increasing power of the Presidential Guard.

According to Human Rights Watch, Habré was found responsible for "widespread political killings, systematic torture, and thousands of arbitrary arrests", as well as ethnic purges when it was perceived that group leaders could pose a threat to his rule, including many of Déby's Zaghawa ethnic group who supported the government. Increasingly paranoid, Habré accused Déby, minister of the interior Mahamat Itno, and then commander-in-chief of the Chadian army Hassan Djamous of plotting a coup d'état. Déby fled first to Darfur, then to Libya, where he was welcomed by Muammar Gaddafi in Tripoli. Itno and Djamous were arrested and killed. Since all three were ethnic Zaghawa, Habré started a targeted campaign against the group which saw hundreds seized, tortured, and imprisoned. Dozens died in detention or were summarily executed. In 2016, Habré was convicted of war crimes by a specially created international tribunal in Senegal. Déby gave the Libyans detailed information about CIA operations in Chad. Gaddafi offered Déby military aid to seize power in Chad in exchange for Libyan prisoners of war.

Déby relocated to Sudan in 1989 and formed the Patriotic Salvation Movement, an insurgent group, supported by Libya and Sudan, which started operations against Habré, and on 1 December 1990 Déby's troops marched unopposed into N'Djamena in a successful coup, ousting Habré.

== Presidency ==
Idriss Déby assumed Chad's presidency in 1991. He was re-elected every five years up until the time of his death in 2021, equaling a total of 30 years in power.

=== 1990s ===
After three months of the provisional government, on 28 February 1991, a charter was approved for Chad with Déby as president. During the following two years, Déby faced a series of coup attempts as government forces clashed with pro-Habré rebel groups, such as the Movement for Democracy and Development (MDD). Seeking to quell dissent, in 1993 Chad legalized political parties and held a National Conference which resulted in the gathering of 750 delegates, the government, trade unions, and the army to discuss the establishment of a pluralist democracy.

However, unrest continued. The Comité de Sursaut National pour la Paix et la Démocratie (CSNPD), led by Lt. Moise Kette, and other southern groups sought to prevent the Déby government from exploiting oil in the Doba Basin and started a rebellion that left hundreds dead. A peace agreement was reached in 1994, but it broke down soon thereafter. Two new groups, the Armed Forces for a Federal Republic (FARF) led by former Kette ally Laokein Barde, and the Democratic Front for Renewal (FDR), and a reformulated MDD clashed with government forces from 1994 to 1995.

Déby, in the mid-1990s, gradually restored basic functions of government and entered into agreements with the World Bank and IMF to carry out substantial economic reforms.

A new constitution was approved by referendum in March 1996, followed by a presidential election in June. Déby fell short of a majority; he was then elected president in the second round of votes held in July, with 69% of the vote.

In 1998 the MDJT rebelled against Déby and his government. They signed a peace agreement in 2002.

=== 2000s ===
Déby was re-elected in the May 2001 presidential election, winning in the first round with 63.17% of the vote, according to official results. A civil war between Christians and Muslims erupted in 2005, accompanied by tensions with Sudan. An attempted coup d'état, involving the shooting down of Déby's plane, was foiled in March 2006.

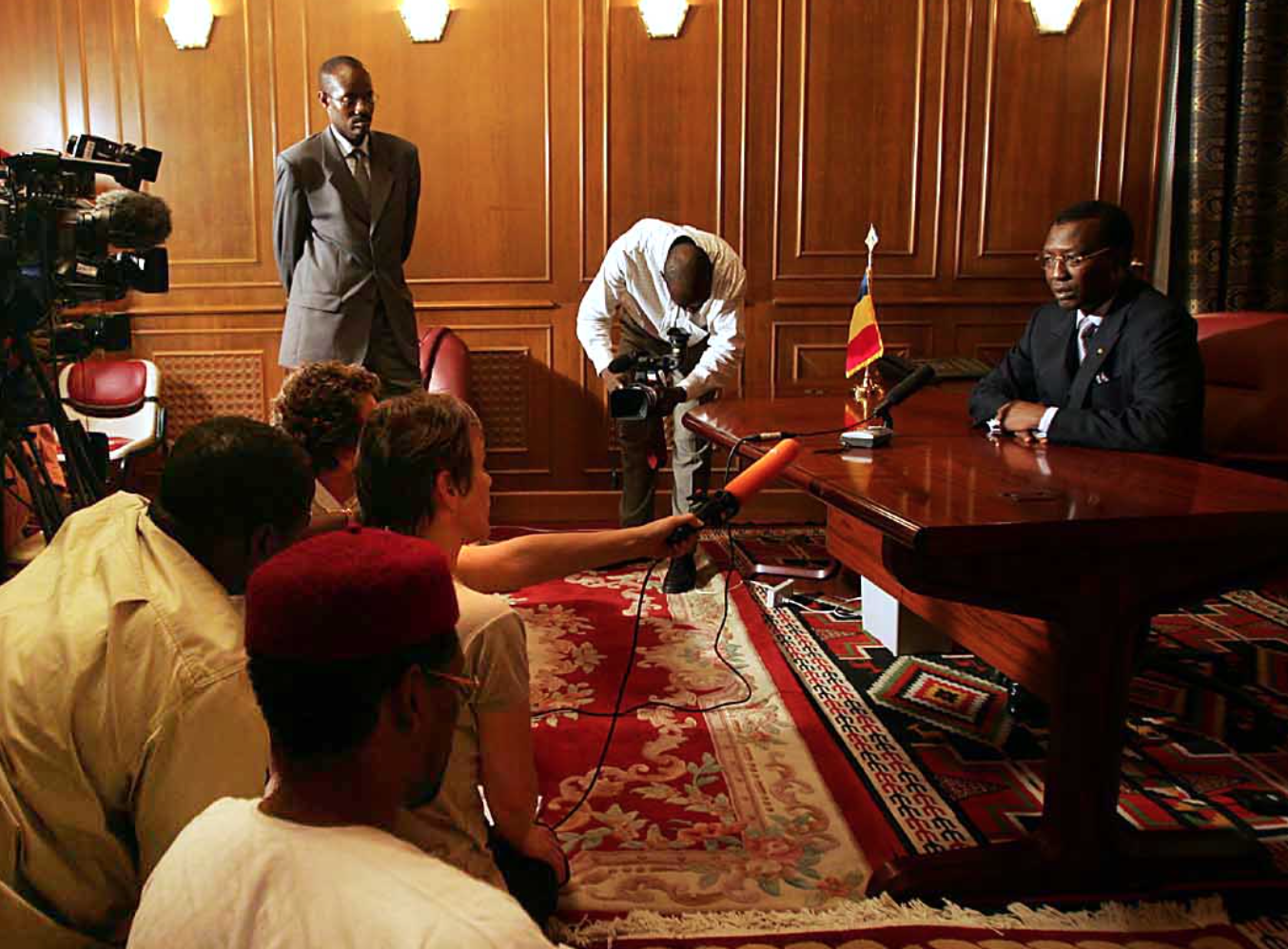
Idriss Déby giving an interview in his office, 2004

In mid-April 2006, there was fighting with rebels at N'Djaména, although the fighting soon subsided with government forces still in control of the capital. Déby subsequently broke ties with Sudan, accusing it of backing the rebels, and said that the May 2006 election would still take place.

Déby was sworn in for another term in office on 8 August 2006. Sudanese president Omar al-Bashir attended Déby's inauguration, when the two leaders agreed to restore diplomatic relations.

After Déby's re-election, several rebel groups broke apart. Déby was in Abéché from 11 to 21 September 2006, flying in a helicopter to personally oversee attacks on Rally of Democratic Forces rebels.

The rebellion in the east continued, and rebels reached N'Djamena on 2 February 2008, with fighting occurring inside the city. After days of fighting, the government remained in control of N'Djamena. Speaking at a press conference on 6 February, Déby said that his forces had defeated the rebels, whom he described as "mercenaries directed by Sudan", and that his forces were in "total control" of the city as well as the whole country.

Against this backdrop, in June 2005, a successful referendum was held to eliminate a two-term constitutional limit, which enabled Déby to run again in 2006. More than 77% of voters approved. Déby was a candidate in the 2006 presidential election, held 3 May, which was greeted with an opposition boycott. According to official results, Déby won the election with 64.67% of the vote.

In 2000, with the north–south dispute quelled, Déby's government started building the country's first oil pipeline, the 1,070 kilometer Chad-Cameroon project. The pipeline was completed in 2003 and praised by the World Bank as "an unprecedented framework to transform oil wealth into direct benefits for the poor, the vulnerable and the environment".

Oil exploitation in the southern Doba region began in June 2000, with World Bank Board approval to finance a small portion of a project, the Chad-Cameroon Petroleum Development Project, aimed at transport of Chadian crude through a 1000-km buried pipeline through Cameroon to the Gulf of Guinea. The project established unique mechanisms for World Bank, private sector, government, and civil society collaboration to guarantee that future oil revenues benefit populations and result in poverty alleviation.

However, with Chad receiving only 12.5% of profits from oil production, and the agreement for these revenues to be deposited into a London-based Citibank escrow account monitored by an independent body to ensure the funds were used for public services and development, not much wealth was immediately transferred to the country.

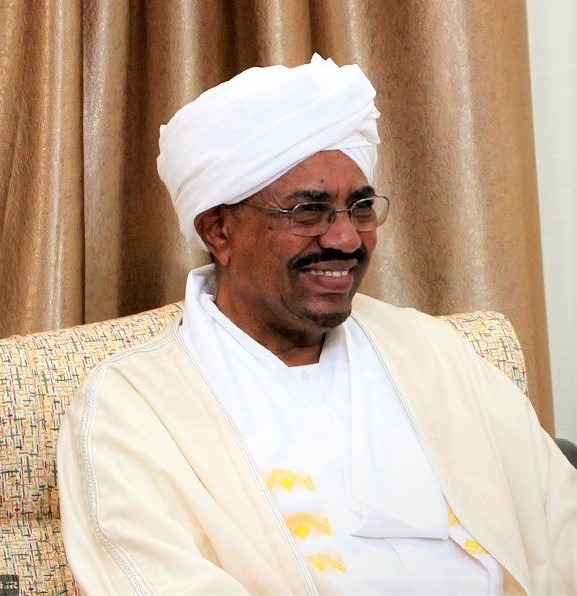
Omar al-Bashir, who Déby had mixed relations with.

During the Chad–Sudan conflict, Sudanese president Omar al-Bashir supported any rebel group fighting against the Chadian government, and the proxy war saw opposition fighting on both sides. Déby visited Khartoum in February 2010 and the leaders would meet again in July 2010 when Bashir visited N'Djamena. These meetings resulted in Chad kicking out rebels while both countries committed to joint border patrols. After Déby won the 2011 Chadian presidential election, Omar al-Bashir decided to visit N'Djamena to attend his inauguration in August. Even though Chad was technically able to arrest al-Bashir, it and other African states declined to do so.

=== 2010s ===
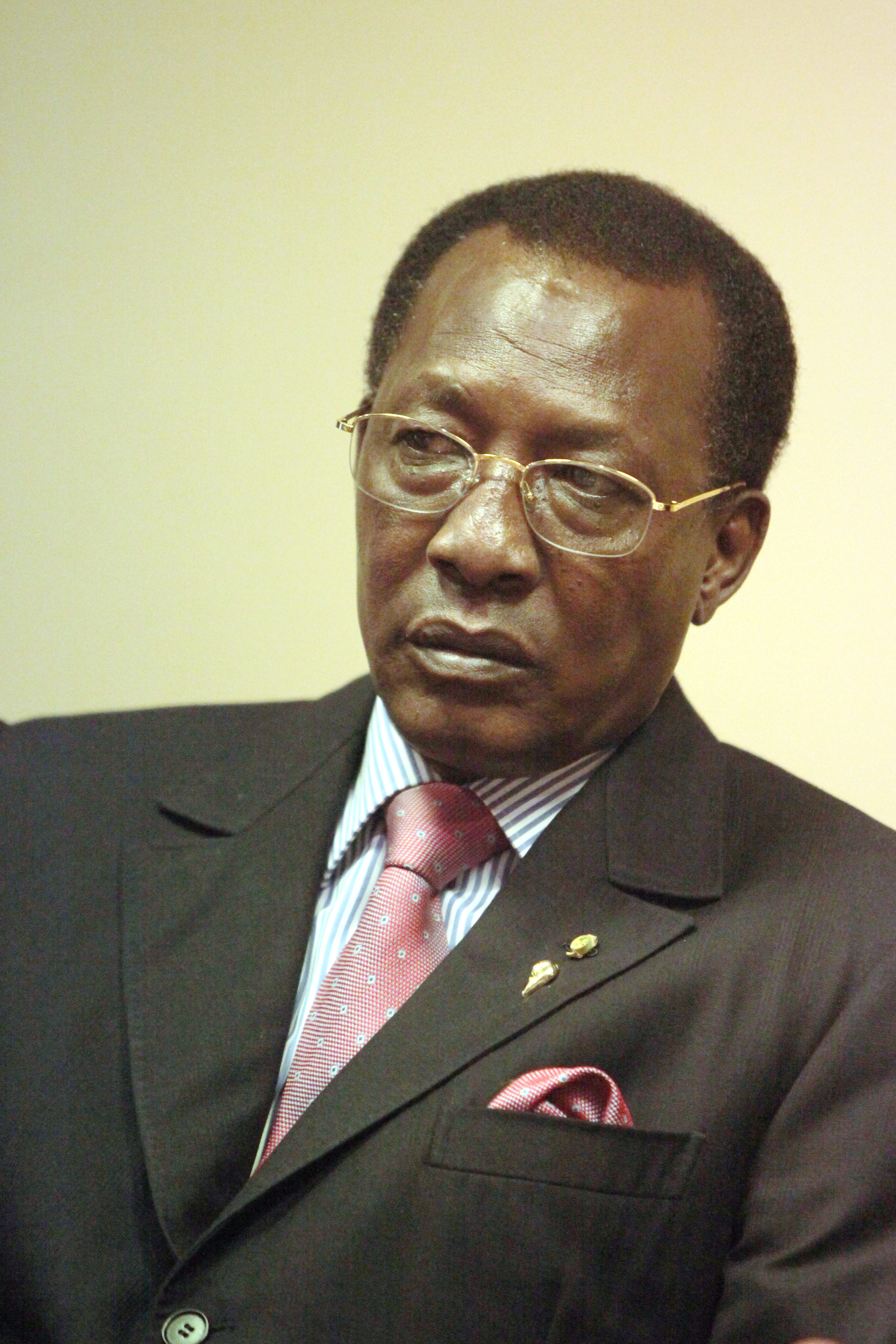
Déby in 2012

On 25 April 2011, Déby was re-elected for a fourth term with 88.7% of the vote and reappointed Emmanuel Nadingar as Prime Minister.

Because of Chad's strategic position in West Africa, Déby sent troops or played a key mediating role in tackling multiple regional crises, such as Darfur, the Central African Republic (CAR), Mali, as well as the fight against Boko Haram.

With the security situation in the Central African Republic deteriorating, Déby decided in 2012 to deploy 400 troops to fight the CAR rebels. In January 2013, Chad also sent 2000 troops to fight Islamist groups in Mali, as part of France's Operation Serval.

In 2006, Chad was placed at the top of the list of the world's most corrupt nations by Forbes magazine, In 2012, Déby launched a nationwide anticorruption campaign called Operation Cobra, which reportedly recovered some $50 million in embezzled funds. Nongovernmental organizations say, however, that Déby has used such initiatives to punish rivals and reward cronies. As of 2016, Transparency International ranked Chad 147 out of 168 nations on its corruption index.

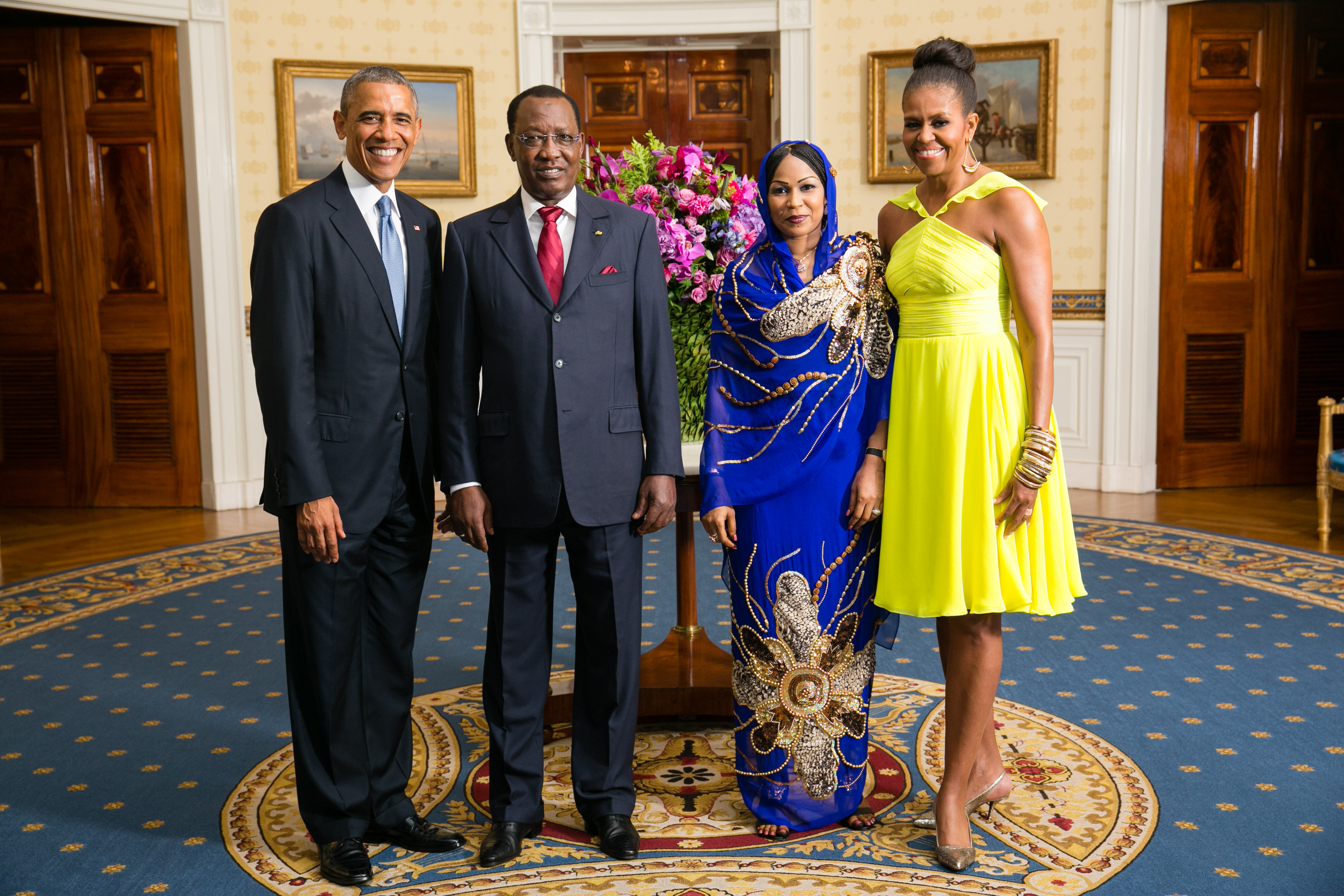
Idriss Déby with the Obamas in August 2014

Faced with a growing threat from Boko Haram, Déby increased Chad's participation in the Multinational Joint Task Force (MNJTF), a combined multinational formation comprising units from Niger, Nigeria, Benin, and Cameroon. In August 2015, Déby claimed in an interview that the MNJTF has successfully "decapitated" Boko Haram.

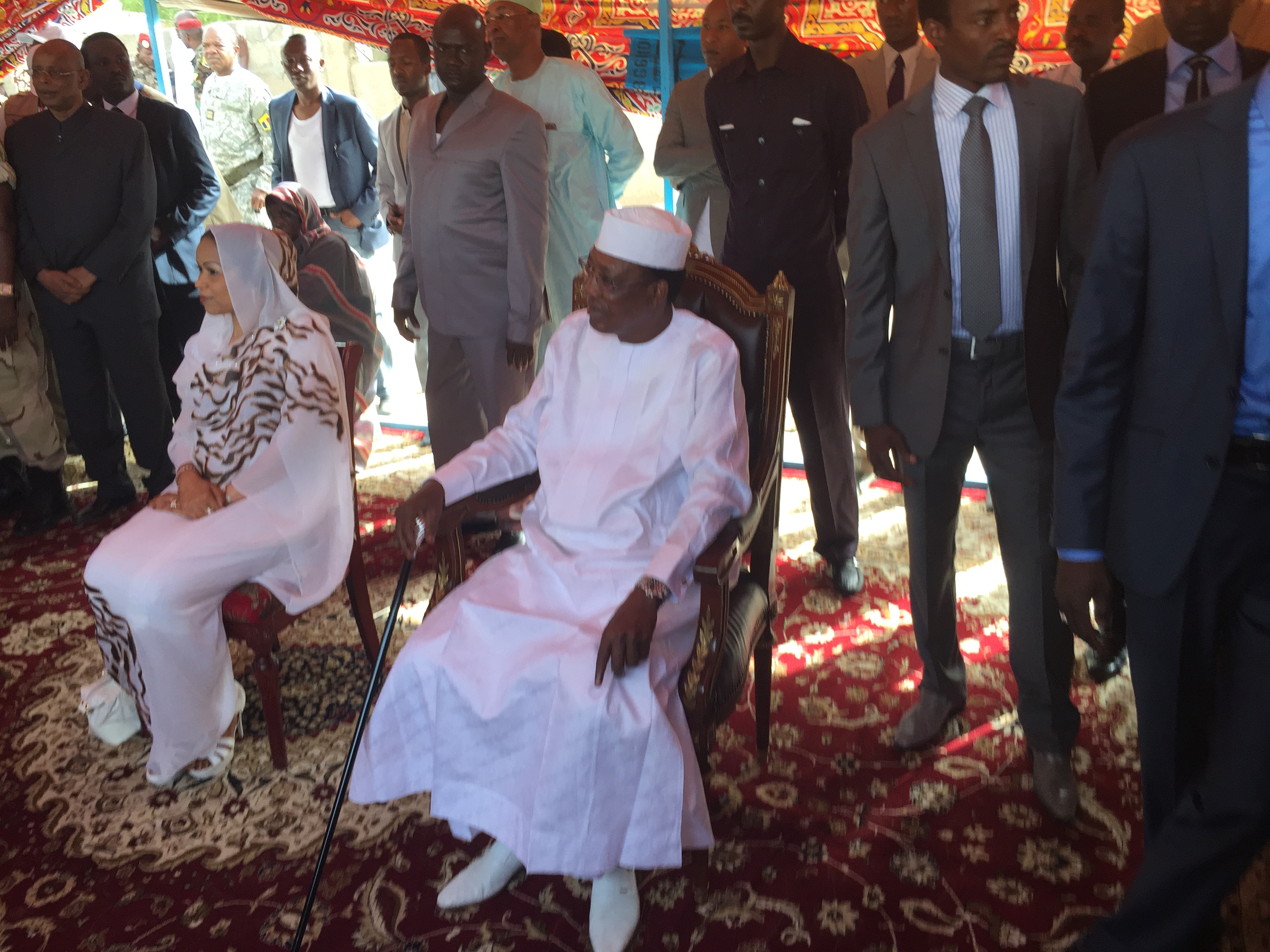
Déby and his wife Hinda waiting to vote, April 2016

In January 2016, Déby succeeded Zimbabwe's Robert Mugabe to become the chairman of the African Union for a one-year term. Upon his inauguration, Déby told presidents that conflicts around the continent had to end "Through diplomacy or by force... We must put an end to these tragedies of our time. We cannot make progress and talk of development if part of our body is sick. We should be the main actors in the search for solution to Africa's crises". One of Déby's first priorities was to accelerate the fight against Boko Haram. On 4 March, the African Union agreed to expand the Multinational Joint Task Force (MNJTF) to 10,000 troops.

During the 21st Conference of the Parties (COP21) in Paris, Idriss Déby raised the issue of Lake Chad, whose area was a small fraction of what it had been in 1973, and called on the international community to provide financing to protect the ecosystem.

In February 2016, Déby was nominated by the Patriotic Salvation Movement to run for a new term in the April 2016 Presidential elections. He pledged to reinstate term limits in the Constitution of Chad in saying that "We must limit terms, we must not concentrate on a system in which a change in power becomes difficult. "In 2005 the constitutional reform was conducted in a context where life of the nation was in danger".

In 2017, the United States Justice Department alleged Déby accepted a $2 million bribe in return for providing a People's Republic of China company with an opportunity to obtain oil rights in Chad without international competition.

In January 2019, Déby and Israeli Prime Minister Benjamin Netanyahu announced the resumption of diplomatic relations between Chad and Israel. Netanyahu described his visit to Chad as “part of the revolution we are having in the Arab and Muslim world.”

=== Final years ===
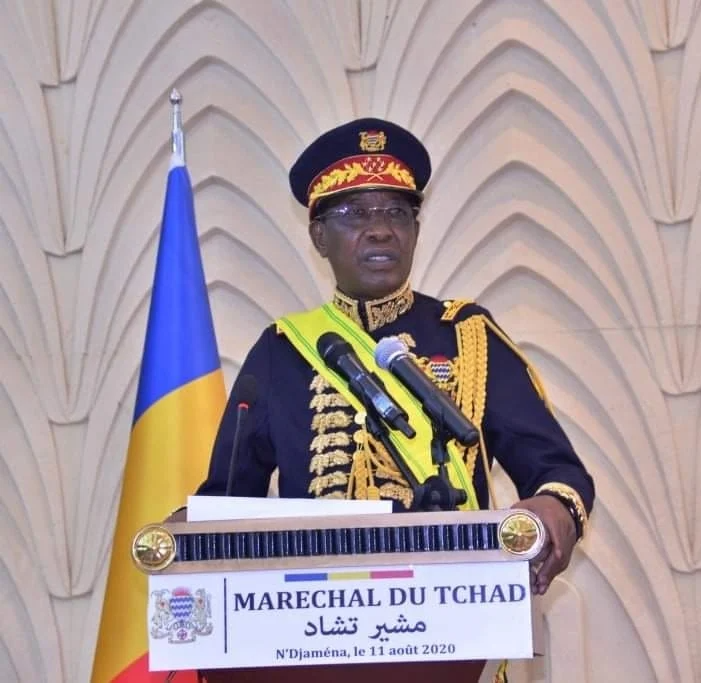
Marshal Idriss Déby Itno in 2020

Déby signed a bill abolishing capital punishment in 2020. The firing squad had last been used on terrorists in 2015.

In March 2020, Déby set up a COVID-19 management committee, replacing the health monitoring unit.

In June 2020, the National Assembly bestowed Déby with the additional title of "Marshal of Chad", for "service rendered to the Nation and the numerous military victories won both inside and outside the country". He officially received the title during a ceremony marking the 60th anniversary of Chad's independence on 11 August.

In February 2021, Déby announced Chad would send 1,200 soldiers alongside French troops to the Sahel border between Niger, Mali, and Burkina Faso, to combat al-Qaeda linked groups.

=== Death ===
In the 2021 presidential election, Déby won his sixth term as president, when results were announced on 19 April, with 79.32% of the votes. In February earlier in the same year, Chadian security forces had attempted to arrest opposition leader Yaya Dillo Djérou, with Djérou claiming five members of his family were killed during this attempt, and the government instead reporting three were killed. Most political opponents had withdrawn from the election, urging a boycott, alleging attacks and excessive use of force by security forces during anti-government protests. Instead of giving a victory speech, Déby went to command the Chadian soldiers in person on the frontlines fighting the northern rebel incursion by the Front for Change and Concord in Chad (FACT).

According to the President's senior presidential advisor Acheikh Ibn-Oumar and Chadian military leaders, on 18 April, Déby was injured by a shell exploding near his vehicle in the village of Mele, near the town of Nokou; despite being immediately flown to the capital for emergency medical rescue, he still succumbed to his wounds two days later and died on 20 April, at the age of 68.

The Chadian parliament and government were both dissolved upon his death and a Transitional Military Council was formed in its place with his son Mahamat Déby Itno as chairman. In addition, the Constitution of Chad was suspended and replaced by a new charter. The government ordered a fourteen-day national mourning with flags half-masted and closed public institutions and educational establishments for several days. A three-day national mourning was announced in Mali and South Sudan; one day of mourning was declared in Cuba, Democratic Republic of the Congo, Guinea and Republic of the Congo.

Déby's funeral took place on 23 April 2021. On that day, thousands gathered in the streets of N'Djamena to pay their respects to Déby. French President Emmanuel Macron, Guinean President Alpha Condé, and several other African leaders attended the funeral.

== Personal life ==
Déby added "Itno" to his surname in January 2006. He was a graduate of Muammar Gaddafi's World Revolutionary Center.

Déby was polygamous and had four wives by 2018 – Zina Wazouna Ahmed Idriss, Hadja Halimé, Hinda Déby Itno (m. 2005), and Amani Musa Hila (m. 2012). BBC News has also mentioned a fifth wife named Ali Bouye. Déby had at least a dozen children.

In September 2005, Déby married Hinda (born 1977), who was reputed for her beauty. This marriage attracted much attention in Chad, and due to tribal affiliations it was seen by many as a strategic means for Déby to bolster his support while under pressure from rebels. Though she was not Déby's oldest or newest wife, Hinda Déby was considered the "First Lady of Chad" due to her influential positions in government and politics. Hinda was a member of the Civil Cabinet of the Presidency, serving as Special Secretary. The daughter of a top Chadian diplomat, Hinda Déby Itno has dual Chadian and French citizenship. She and Déby had five children, all born in Neuilly-sur-Seine, who also hold French nationality.

On 21 January 2012, Déby married his most recent wife, Amani Musa Hila, a Sudanese national, member of Idriss Déby's Zaghawa tribe, and daughter of Janjaweed militia leader Musa Hilal in Darfur. The marriage was seen as a way to strengthen bilateral ties between Chad and Sudan following a 2010 agreement to normalize diplomatic relations.

On 2 July 2007, Déby's son, Brahim, was found dead aged 27 in the parking garage of his apartment near Paris. A murder inquiry was launched by the French police. Blogger Makaila Nguebla attributes the defection of many Chadian government leaders to their indignation over Brahim's conduct: "He is at the root of all the frustration. He used to slap government ministers, senior Chadian officials were humiliated by Déby's son." In July 2011, four men were convicted of "robbery leading to death without intention to kill" in the case and sentenced to prison sentences of between five and thirteen years.

Déby was a practicing Muslim.

== See also ==
- List of heads of state of Chad
- Human rights in Chad
- List of assassinated and executed heads of state and government

== Notes ==
Political offices
Preceded by Hissène Habré	President of Chad; 1991–2021	Succeeded by Mahamat Déby
Diplomatic posts
Preceded by Robert Mugabe	Chairperson of the African Union; 2016–2017	Succeeded by Alpha Condé
