= Languages of Benin =

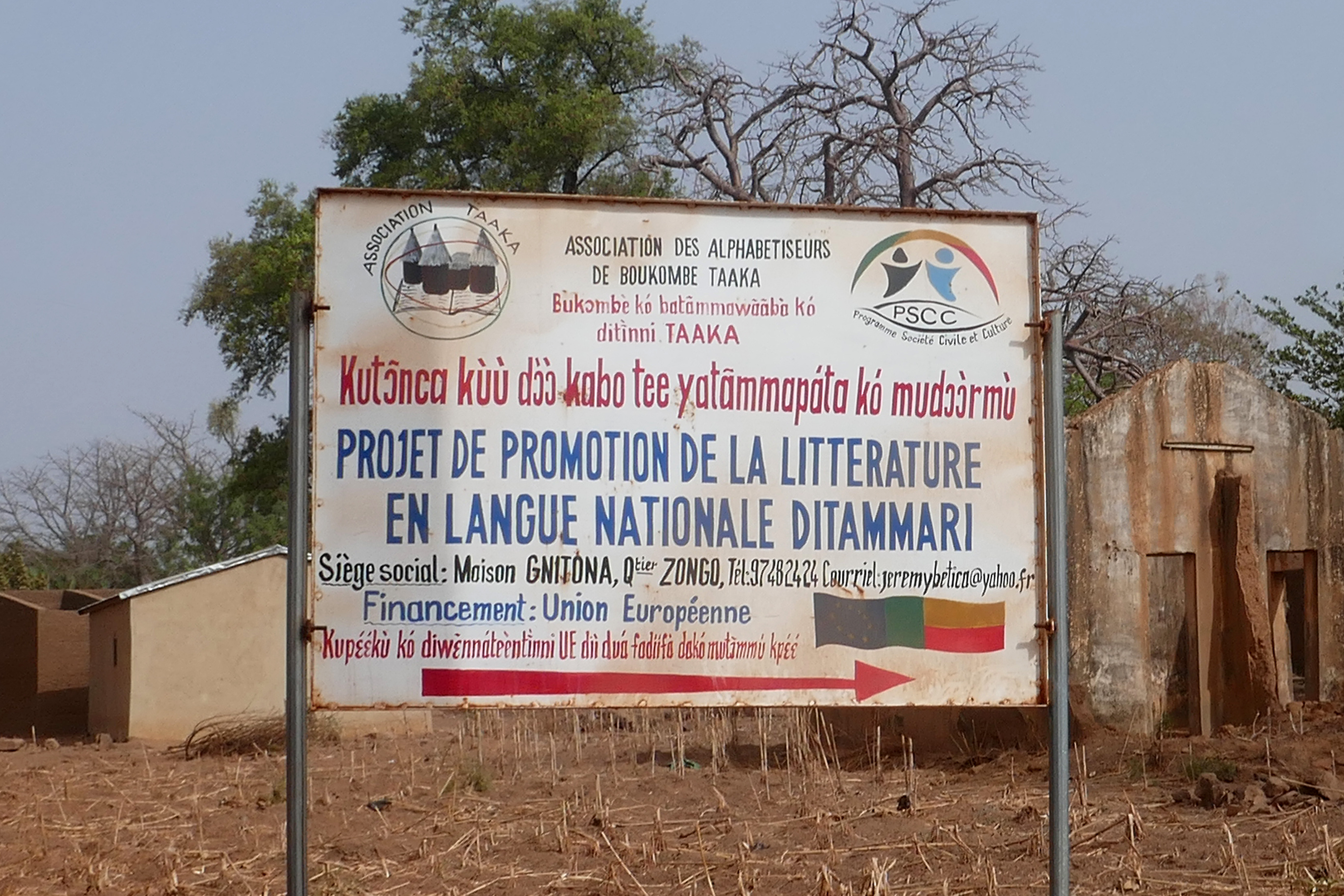
- Sign in French and Tammari, Benin
- Official: French
- National: Fon, Yom, Yoruba, Gen, Kabiyé, Tammari, Bariba, Fulfulde, Others
- Foreign: English; Spanish; Arabic; Portuguese; German
- Signed: Francophone African Sign Language

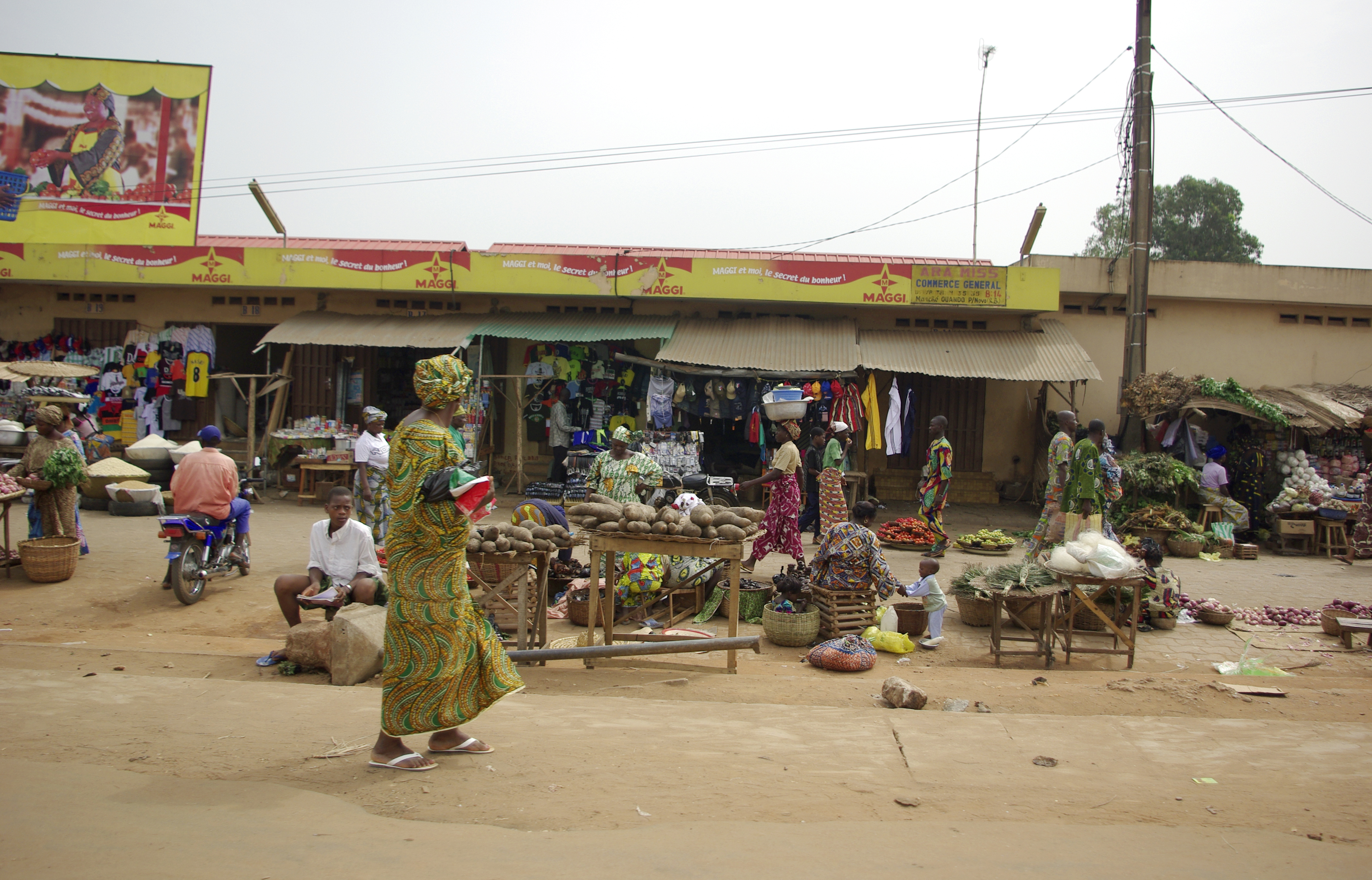
Signs in French at a market in Porto-Novo

Benin is a diverse country linguistically. Of those, French is the official language, and most of the indigenous languages are considered national languages.

Benin is a Francophone country, and in 2023, French was spoken by 4.6 million people out of 13.7 million (33.68%).

Of the Beninese languages, Fon (a Gbe language) and Yoruba are the most important in the south of the country. In the north there are half a dozen regionally important languages, including Bariba (a Gur language) and Fulfulde (Fula).

Education for the deaf in Benin uses American Sign Language, introduced by the deaf American missionary Andrew Foster.

The multilingual character of Beninese society is characterized by the number of languages spoken, ethno-linguistic diversity, stratification of language use (whereby French is used officially and other languages used in other spheres of activity), and by the fact that many Beninese are polyglots.

== French ==
The sole official language of Benin is French, according to title I, article I of the Constitution of Benin. French was introduced during the colonial period and retained as the official language upon independence. Today it is an important lingua franca between diverse ethnic groups. According to Ethnologue, it is spoken by 3.8 million people (2016) out of the total population of more than 10 million. For the majority of French speakers in Benin it is the second language.

It is important to know French to get an administrative position or work in the cities in general, and speaking it is a mark of prestige. According to a study by Amadou Sanni and Mahouton Atodjinou in 2012, it is estimated that Benin will be completely Francophone by 2060. The authors note that, in 2002, 43 percent of men spoke the language compared to 25.8 percent of women. In 2002, more than half of the residents of Cotonou spoke French.

Most printed media outlets are in French. The Constitution grants freedom of expression. Benin is a member of the Organisation internationale de la francophonie. The region of Benin Gi-Mono is a member of the International Association of Francophone regions.

A unique variety of French called français d'Afrique has developed in the streets and markets of Cotonou. Grammatical structures are typically borrowed from the speaker's first language. It is especially the conjugation rules that have been changed the most, notably the less common forms like the literary style. It has an almost argotic character.

== National languages ==
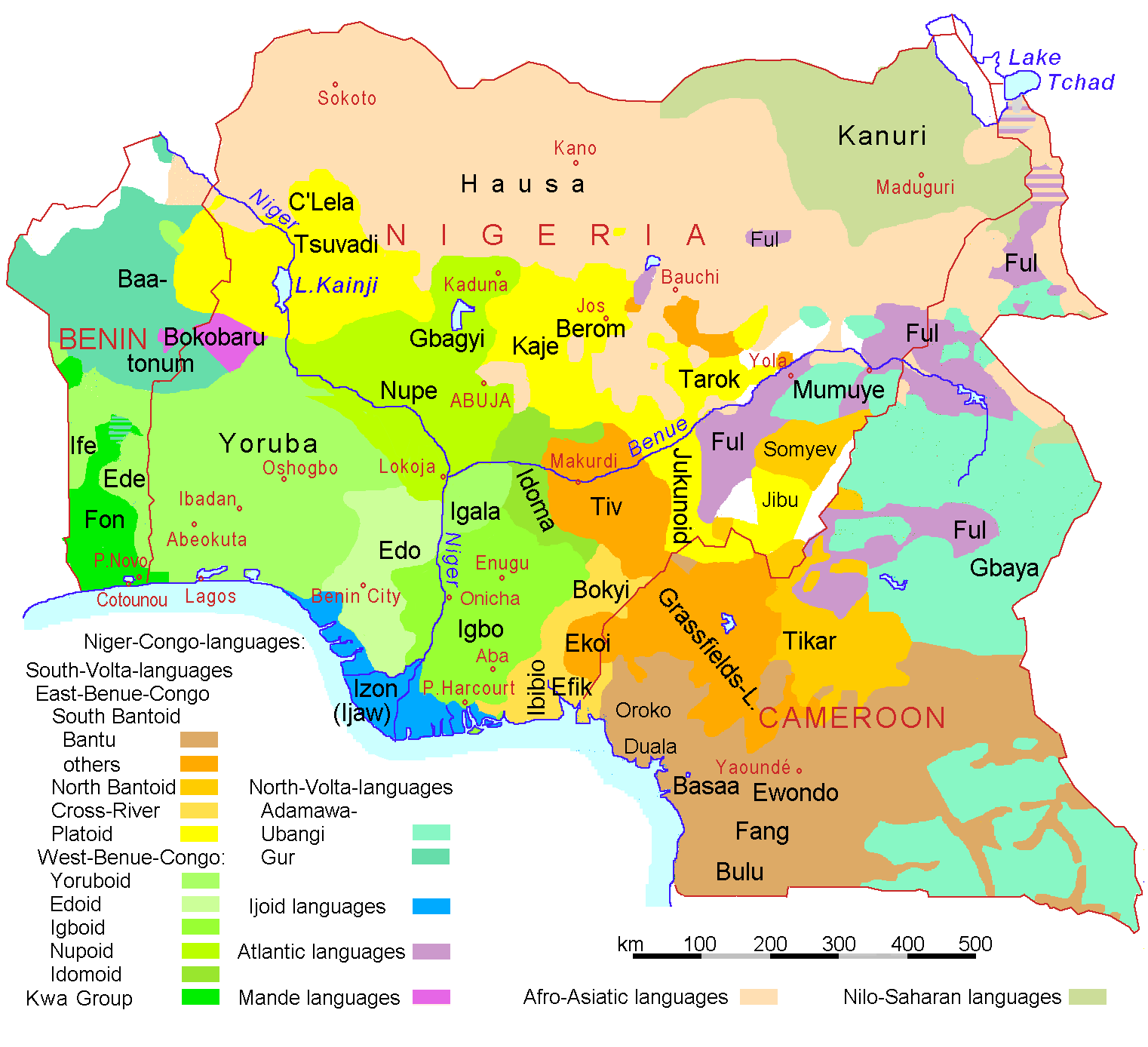
Language map of Benin, Nigeria, and Cameroon

According to title II, article 11 of the Constitution, all communities comprising the Béninese nation shall enjoy the freedom to use their spoken and written languages and to develop their own culture while respecting those of others, and the State must promote the development of national languages of intercommunication.

Fon is the most widely spoken indigenous language, spoken by 24% of the population. It is the first language of more than 17% of Benin's population. The language is mainly spoken in the Atlantique, Littoral, Collines and Zou Departments.

Other important languages are Yoruba, Bariba, Mina, Dendi, Mokole, Yom, and Aja. Benin implemented a National Literacy and Adult Education Policy, which allowed adult speakers of national languages to use their languages for cultural advancement.

In the capital of Porto-Novo, the two main ethnolinguistic groups are Yoruba and Gun-Gbe, with the smaller population of Wemi, Seto, Tori, Xwala, Defi, and Tofin speakers. Yoruba newspapers from neighboring Nigeria are popular.

=== Vulnerable, threatened, and endangered languages ===
- Aguna, also called Awuna or Agunaco, is a threatened Kwa language with currently 3,470 native speakers worldwide.
- Anii, also called Gisida, Basila, Bassila, Baseca, "Winji-Winji", "Ouinji-Ouinji", or Akpe, is a vulnerable Kwa language, estimated to be <25,000 native speakers worldwide as of 1996 to as much as 50,000 as of 2003-2007. It contains the dialects and variants Ananjubi, Balanka, Akpe, Gikolodjya, Gilempla, Gisème and Giseda.
- Gwamhi-Wuri, also known as Lyase, Lyase-Ne, Gwamhyə-Wuri-Mba, Gwamfi, or "Banganci", is a vulnerable Kainji language with anywhere from 1,838 to 16,000 native speakers worldwide as of 2000. It contains the dialects and variants Wuri, Gwamhyə and Mba.
- Miyobe, also known as Soruba, Mi yɔbɛ, Bijobe, Biyobe, Sorouba, Solla, Uyobe, Meyobe, Kayobe, Kuyobe, Sola, Solamba, or Kyobe, is a threatened Gur language with 8,700 native speakers worldwide, 7,000 of them in Benin as of 1991.
- Notre, also dubbed Nõtre, Bulba, Nootre, Burusa, or Boulba, is a vulnerable Gur language estimated to number anywhere from 1,500 to 2,368 speakers, as of 2002 and 1996, respectively.
- Tchumbuli, also known as Basa, Tshummbuli, Chombulon, or Tchombolo, is a severely endangered Kwa language, with anywhere from 1,838 to 2,500 speakers. Dialects and variants include Cobecha and Tchumbuli.

=== Orthographies ===
The orthographies of the national languages of Benin are codified and periodically updated by the Ministry of Literacy and Promotion of National Languages (Ministère de l’Alphabétisation et de la Promotion des langues nationales) and the National Center for Applied Linguistics (Centre national de linguistique appliquée).

A common alphabet for the national languages of Benin is based on the Latin alphabet, with the addition of the letters Ɓ ɓ, Ɖ ɖ, Ɗ ɗ, Ɛ ɛ, Ǝ ǝ, Ƒ ƒ, Ɣ ɣ, Ɩ ɩ, Ŋ ŋ, Ɔ ɔ, Ʊ ʊ, Ʋ ʋ, Ƴ ƴ, and Ʒ ʒ. Diacritical marks are used for marking tone and nasalization:

| Sound | Mark |
|---|---|
| Low tone | Grave (V̀) |
| High tone | Acute (V́) |
| High-low tone | Caron (V̌) |
| Low-high tone | Circumflex (V̂) |
| Middle tone | Macron (V̄) |
| Nasalization | The letter n after the vowel in Kwa languages. Superscript (Ṽ) or subscript (V̰) tilde in other languages. |

The Gbékoun script was invented as an indigenous alternative to the Latin orthographies.

== Foreign languages ==
English is studied as a foreign language in secondary schools. There is a high demand for English teachers in Benin. English is emerging as an important language of trade in Benin due to its being the national tongue of Benin's regionally powerful neighbour Nigeria.

Spanish and German are also taught in many Beninese secondary schools.
