= Gbékoun script =

Writing system for Benin

Gbékoun
- Script type: alphabet
- Period: fl. 1994–present
- Direction: Left-to-right
- Languages: Fon, other languages of Benin
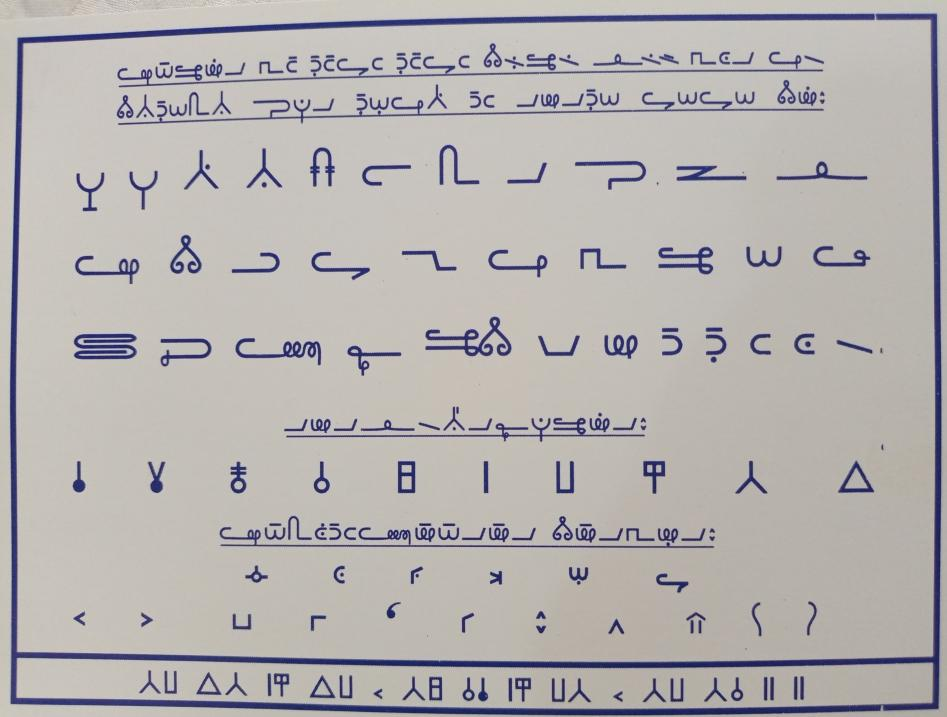
- The Gbékoun script. At top are the 33 letters, in middle the 10 digits (1 through 9, with zero at right), and at bottom are the punctuation marks.

The Gbékoun script was created in 1994 by Togbédji Adigbè of Dangbo, a speaker of the Weme dialect of Fon. It was intended as an indigenous script for all the languages of the Republic of Benin, and has been applied to Fon, Adja, Yoruba, Dendi, Boo, Yom and Ayizo. It has been used in mother-tongue education in specialized schools.

Gbékoun script consists of 24 consonant letters and 9 vowel letters. There are tonic diacritics, decimal digits and number of punctuation marks.
