= Niger–Benin Oil Pipeline =

Oil pipeline in West Africa

The Niger–Benin Oil Pipeline, also known as Niger–Benin Export Pipeline (NBEP), is a 1,950 kilometer long crude oil pipeline connecting oilfields near the desert oasis of Agadem in Niger to the Atlantic Ocean. It ends in the Gulf of Guinea near Benin's largest city Cotonou. The pipeline was built and is operated by the China National Petroleum Corporation (CNPC). It was built between 2019 and 2023, with exports initially expected to begin in January 2024. After a border closure dispute between Niger and Benin was resolved thanks to Chinese mediation, exports through the pipeline began in May 2024. On June 16, 2024, an attack by a rebel group opposed to the Nigerien military junta damaged the pipeline after just one shipment of oil. Oil exports through the pipeline resumed in August 2024.

It is the longest pipeline in Africa.

== Location ==
The pipeline runs from Koulélé in the Agadem Rift Basin in a southwestern direction towards the Soraz (Société de raffinage de Zinder) refinery near the city of Zinder. The refinery was built by CNPC and is in operation since November 2011. From Zinder, the pipeline continues westward until turning south towards the border with Benin. The Nigerien section of the pipeline measures 1,275 kilometers. In Benin, the pipeline runs southward for 675 kilometers until reaching the sea. It ends east of Cotonou, at Port Sèmè-Kpodji offshore terminal, approximately 15 kilometers off the coast.

== Overview ==
As of December 2023, CNPC is the only company producing oil in Niger, although there are two other oil companies operating in other blocks in Niger: Sonatrach and Savannah Energy. CNPC began exploration in Niger in 2003 with the Tenere and Bilma blocks. Extensive exploration of the Agadem block took place between 2008 and 2017.

An export pipeline from the Nigerien oilfields to the Atlantic coast is in the works since 2012. CNPC initially planned to link up the Agadem oilfield to the similarly Chinese-operated oil assets in Chad. The shelved Niger Chad Oil Pipeline would have run 600 kilometers from the Agadem basin to the Doba Basin in Chad. There, it would connect to the existing Chad-Cameroon Oil Pipeline, providing sea access at the Cameroonian port of Kribi. Security concerns about Boko Haram in the Chad Basin as well as about a weakening state in Cameroon have contributed to the decision against the Niger-Chad pipeline. An additional reason from a Chinese perspective may have been that CNPC exports from Niger would have been dependent on the owners and operators of the Chad-Cameroon pipeline (Exxon Mobil, Chevron and Petronas) for access to the sea.

In January 2019, Niger and Benin signed an agreement to build a pipeline linking the two countries with the goal of enabling the export of Nigerien oil. CNPC signed a contract for the construction and operation of a pipeline with the government of Benin in August 2019. CNPC was contracted to construct the pipeline along with the West African Gas Pipeline Company (WAPCo).

The NBEP was officially commissioned by Niger's Prime Minister Ali Lamine Zeine in November 2023. The following month, de facto president Abdourahamane Tiani announced the first exports would begin in January 2024. In April 2024, Zeine awarded the rights for selling the Nigerien state's share of the exported oil (25.4 percent) to CNPC in exchange for pre-financing of US$400 million. The 12-month agreement may not be renewed if other traders offer better terms.

The NBEP will be accessible to third parties. UK-based Savannah Energy has indicated its intent to utilize the pipeline.

Before the NBEP, the daily production of around 20,000 barrels supplied the Soraz refinery through an approximately 13-inch diameter 460 kilometer pipeline which connects the oil fields at Agadem to the refinery. The refinery mainly produces diesel and super petrol for the domestic market and exports the surplus. CNPC owns 60 percent of the Soraz refinery, while Niger holds 40 percent. It was built in 2011 in a joint venture at a cost of five billion USD.

The NBEP and the new facilities at the oilfields are supposed to enable the production of 110,000 barrels per day, of which 90,000 will be exported through the port in Benin. The remaining 20,000 will continue to go to the Soraz refinery.

The 20-inch diameter pipeline project comprises nine intermediate stations before terminating at Port Sèmè: eight pumping stations (six in Niger and two in Benin) and a petroleum terminal in Sèmè with a 2 million barrel storage capacity. The offshore export terminal is connected via two parallel 28-inch subsea pipelines with a capacity of a million barrels per day. It includes a pipeline-end manifold and a single-buoy mooring system designed with six mooring anchors.

Niger will hold a 15 percent share in the pipeline.

== Construction ==
Nigerien President Mahamadou Issoufou laid the first stone in September 2019. The first batch of pipeline segments was shipped from Tianjin, China to Benin in January 2020.

In February 2020, CNPC suspended all construction work due to the COVID pandemic. Because of this disruption, the pipeline could not be finished in 2021.

In 2021, Dutch company Bluewater Energy Services was contracted to build the single-point mooring system at the offshore terminal.

In October 2022, more than 600 kilometers of track had been built.

The pipeline officially opened in May 2024, following a resolution of a trade dispute between Niger and Benin as part of the fallout from the 2023 Nigerien coup d'état.

Following one oil shipment, the pipeline was damaged the following month in an attack by a rebel group. Resumption of disputes between Niger and Benin resulted in the pipeline remaining closed until August 2024, when it was re-opened.

== See also ==
- Petroleum industry in Niger
- Oil and mining industry of Niger
- China–Niger relations
- Sino-African relations
- Africa–China economic relations
