= Deme (disambiguation) =

A deme was a subdivision of Athens in ancient Greece.

Deme may also refer to:

- Deme, an alternative name for the municipalities of Greece (Greek: δήμος, dhímos; pl. δήμοι, dhímoi)
- Demes in the Byzantine Empire, chariot racing factions
- Dèmè, Benin
- Deme (biology), a local population of organisms of one species that actively interbreed with one another and share a distinct gene pool
- DEME, one of the largest dredging companies in the world
- Deme, an Iranian name for the Towers of Silence

== People ==
- Masanobu Deme (1932–2016), Japanese film director
- József Deme (born 1951), Hungarian Olympic sprint canoeist
- Imre Deme (born 1983), Hungarian football (soccer) player
