= Togbota =

Coordinates: 6°40′N 2°26′E

- Arrondissement and town
- Interactive map of Togbota
- Country: Benin
- Department: Ouémé Department
- Commune: Adjohoun
- Time zone: UTC+1 (WAT)

Togbota is a small town and arrondissement located in the commune of Adjohoun in the Ouémé Department of Benin. Agriculture is the main industry lying in the fertile Ouémé River Valley of southern Benin. In 2008 during the 2008 Benin floods, the area was affected by the flooding of the Ouémé River which affected much of Adjohoun commune.
