= Awonou =

Coordinates: 6.6944°N 2.5075°E

- Arrondissement and town
- Interactive map of Awonou
- Country: Benin
- Department: Oueme Department
- Commune: Adjohoun
- Time zone: UTC+1 (WAT)

Awonou is a small town and arrondissement located in the commune of Adjohoun in the Oueme Department of Benin. Agriculture is the main industry. During the 2008 Benin floods, Awonou was the only area in Adjohoun commune not affected by the flooding of the Ouémé River.
