= Universite des Sciences Appliquée et Management =

Coordinates: 6.4692°N 2.6344°E

- Established: 2003; 23 years ago
- Location: Porto-Novo, Ouémé Department, Benin

Université des Sciences Appliquées et Management (USAM) is a university located in Porto-Novo, Ouémé, Benin, Founded in 2003.

== List of Faculties ==
- Faculty of Legal, Administrative and Political
- Faculty of Economics
- Faculty of Management Sciences
- Faculty of Health Sciences
- Faculty of Arts and Social Sciences
- Faculty of Agricultural Sciences
- Faculty of Applied Sciences
