= Ekpè =

Coordinates: 6°24′N 2°32′E

- Arrondissement
- Interactive map of Ekpè
- Country: Benin
- Department: Ouémé Department
- Commune: Sèmè-Kpodji

Population (2013)
  - Total: 75,313
- Time zone: UTC+1 (WAT)

Ekpè is an arrondissement in the Ouémé department of Benin. It is an administrative division under the jurisdiction of the commune of Sèmè-Kpodji. According to the population census conducted by the Institut National de la Statistique Benin on 15 February 2013, the arrondissement had a total population of 75,313.
