= Brahim Déby =

Son of Chadian President Idriss Déby

- Born: Brahim Déby Itno; 6 June 1980; Chad
- Died: 2 July 2007 (aged 27); Courbevoie, France
- Cause of death: Asphyxiation
- Father: Idriss Déby

Brahim Déby Itno (Arabic: إبراهيم ديبي إتنو Ibrahīm Daybī Itnū, 6 June 1980 – 2 July 2007) was the son of Idriss Déby, the former president of Chad.

== Personal life ==
Brahim attended the University of Ottawa in Canada as a foreign exchange student and graduated in 2004 with a degree in business administration. It is claimed that, in 2005, President Déby held a secret meeting in which he expressed his desire to have Brahim succeed him at some point; this reportedly caused a rift in the family.

On 24 May 2006, Brahim Déby was arrested outside a Paris nightclub after getting involved in a brawl. During the fight, an unlicensed semi-automatic pistol fell from his pocket. Police later searched his house and found 375 grams of marijuana. On 3 June 2006, Brahim Déby was given a six-month suspended sentence for drugs and arms possession. He was subsequently sacked as an advisor to his father.

Déby was found dead by a security guard in his apartment building's parking garage in Courbevoie, a suburb of Paris, on 2 July 2007. Due to the apparently violent nature of his death, French authorities began investigating it as murder. An autopsy indicated that Déby, who was covered in white powder, died due to asphyxiation, probably from the powder, which was thought to have been sprayed from a fire extinguisher found near his body. Déby had a wound on his head, but this was thought to be unrelated to his death.

According to a lawyer for Déby's family on 17 July, Déby was attacked ten days after arriving in France from Chad; his father had advised him not to return to France due to his past legal issues there. Shortly prior to the attack, Déby was said to be very worried and had received a telephone call. He was attacked by four or five men disguised as policemen who waited for him to arrive at the parking garage. The attackers tasered Déby before killing him by spraying him with the fire extinguisher powder. They then searched his apartment for an unknown reason; it was speculated that the attackers might have been looking for money kept there by Déby.

Déby's body was returned to Chad aboard a specially chartered flight on the morning of 4 July. He was buried at midday on the same day in the Muslim cemetery in Lamadji, to the north of N'Djamena. The funeral was held privately but was nevertheless widely attended, with Déby's extended family, as well as government ministers and various political figures, present.

Five arrests (four in Paris, one in Romania) made in connection with Déby's death were reported on 28 November 2008. In 2011 four men were convicted of "robbery leading to death without intention to kill" and sentenced to prison sentences of between five and thirteen years; one man was acquitted. A further trial was held in 2013, after prosecutors protested the initial sentences as unduly lenient.
