= Fon language =

Gbe language

Fon
- fɔ̀ngbè
- Native to: Benin, Nigeria, Togo
- Ethnicity: Fon people
- Native speakers: 2.3 million (2019–2021)
- Language family: Niger–Congo?: Atlantic–Congo; Volta–Congo; Volta–Niger; Gbe; Fon
- Dialects: Agbome; Arohun; Gun; Gbekon; Kpase
- Writing system: Latin; Gbékoun

Official status
- Official language in: Benin

Language codes
- ISO 639-2: fon
- ISO 639-3: fon – inclusive code Individual codes: guw – Gun mxl – Maxi Gbe wem – Weme Gbe
- Glottolog: fonn1241 Fon language
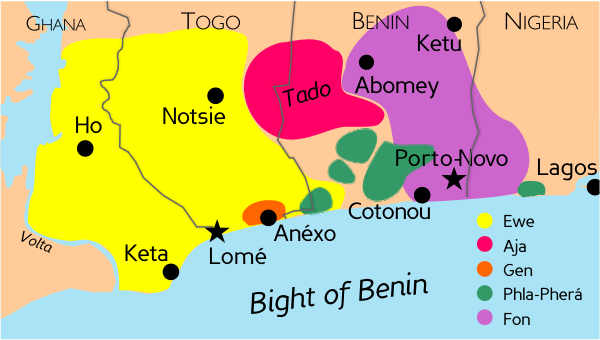
- Gbe languages. Fon is purple.

- Person: Fon
- People: Fon-nu
- Language: fɔ̀ngbè
- Country: Danhɔmɛ

Fon (fɔ̀ngbè, pronounced [fɔ̃̀ɡ͡bē]), also historically known as Dahomean, is the language of the Fon people. It belongs to the Gbe group within the larger Atlantic–Congo family. It is primarily spoken in Benin, as well as in Nigeria and Togo by approximately 2.3 million speakers. Like the other Gbe languages, Fon is an isolating language with a SVO basic word order.

== Cultural and legal status ==
In Benin, French is the official language, and Fon and other indigenous languages, including Yom and Yoruba, are classified as national languages.

== Dialects ==
The standardized Fon language is part of the Fon cluster of languages inside the Eastern Gbe languages. Hounkpati B Christophe Capo groups Agbome, Kpase, Gun, Maxi and Weme (Ouémé) in the Fon dialect cluster, although other clusterings are suggested. Standard Fon is the primary target of language planning efforts in Benin, although separate efforts exist for Gun, Gen, and other languages of the country.

== Phonology ==
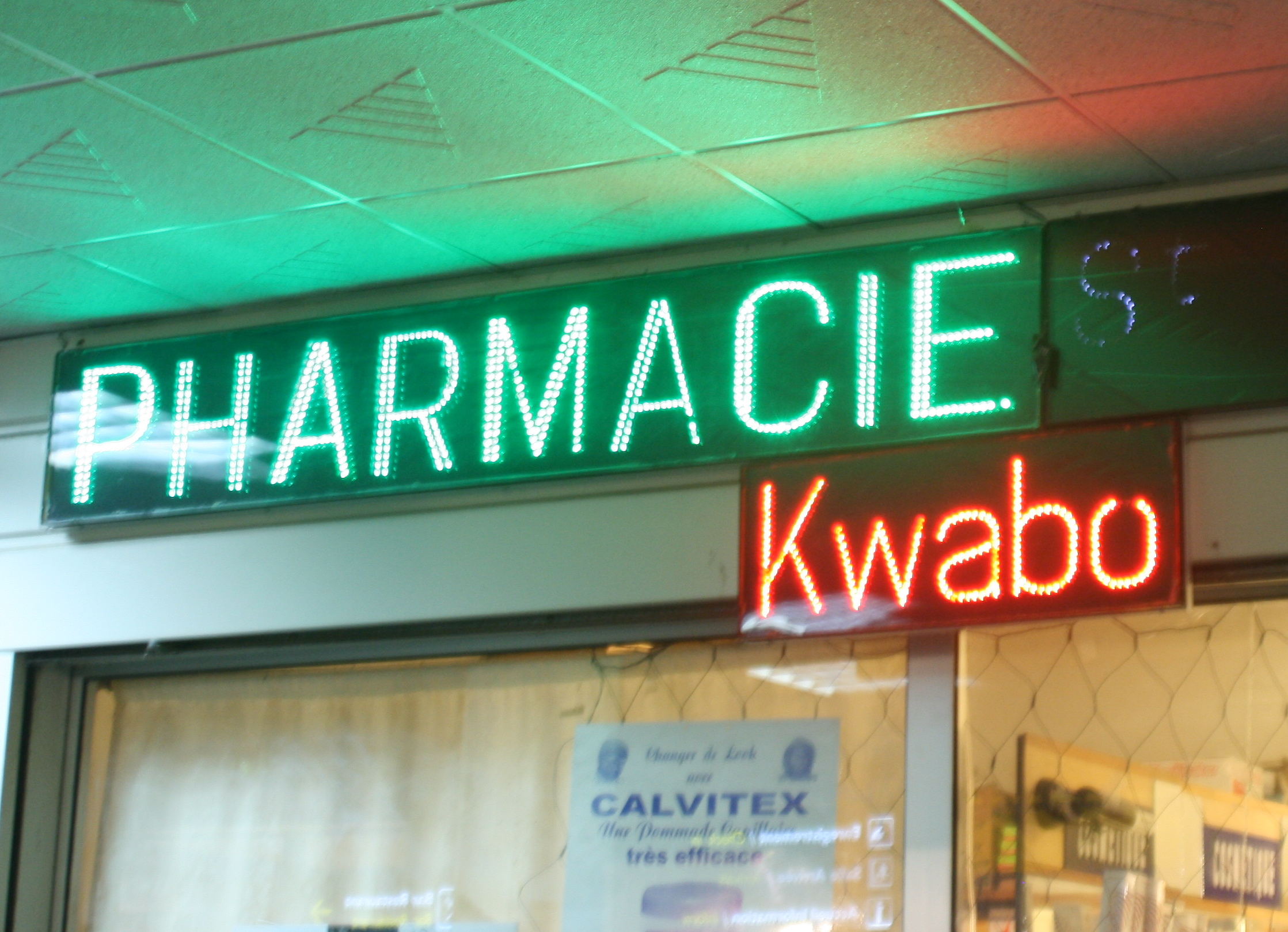
"Welcome" (Kwabɔ) in Fon at a pharmacy at Cotonou Airport in Cotonou, Benin

=== Vowels ===
Fon has seven oral vowel phonemes and five nasal vowel phonemes.

Vowel phonemes of Fon
	Oral		Nasal	
	front	back	front	back
Close	i	u	ĩ	ũ
Close-Mid	e	o		
Open-mid	ɛ	ɔ	ɛ̃	ɔ̃
Open	a		ã	

=== Consonants ===
Consonant phonemes of Fon
	Labial		Coronal		Palatal		Velar		Labial -velar	
"Nasal"	m ~ b		n ~ ɖ							
Occlusive	(p)		t	d	tʃ	dʒ	k	ɡ	kp	ɡb
Fricative	f	v	s	z			x	ɣ	xʷ	ɣʷ
Approximant			l ~ ɾ		ɲ ~ j				w	

/p/ occurs in only linguistic mimesis and loanwords but is often replaced by /f/ in the latter, as in cɔ́fù 'shop'. Several of the voiced occlusives occur before only oral vowels, and the homorganic nasal stops occur before only nasal vowels, which indicates that [b] [m] and [ɖ] [n] are allophones. [ɲ] is in free variation with [j̃] and so Fong can be argued to have no phonemic nasal consonants, a pattern rather common in West Africa. (Note: This is a matter of perspective; it could also be argued that [b] and [ɖ] are denasalized allophones of /m/ and /n/ before oral vowels.) /w/ is nasalized (to [ŋʷ]) before nasal vowels, and may assimilate to [ɥ] before /i/. /l/ is sometimes also nasalized.

The only consonant clusters in Fon have /l/ or /j/ as the second consonant. After (post)alveolars, /l/ is optionally realized as [ɾ]: klɔ́ 'to wash', wlí 'to catch', jlò [d͡ʒlò] ~ [d͡ʒɾò] 'to want'.

=== Tone ===
Fon has two phonemic tones: high and low. High is realized as rising (low–high) after a voiced consonant. Basic disyllabic words have all four possibilities: high–high, high–low, low–high, and low–low.

In longer phonological words, such as verb and noun phrases, a high tone tends to persist until the final syllable, which, if it has a phonemic low tone, becomes falling (high–low). Low tones disappear between high tones, but their effect remains as a downstep. Rising tones (low–high) simplify to high after high (without triggering downstep) and to low before high.

Hwevísatɔ́, é ko hɔ asón we.
/ɣʷèví-sà-tɔ́ é kò xɔ̀ àsɔ̃́ wè/
[ɣʷèvísáꜜtɔ́‖ é kó ꜜxɔ̂ àsɔ̃́ wê‖]
fish-sell-agent s/he PERF buy crab two
"The fishmonger, she bought two crabs."

In Ouidah, a rising or falling tone is realized as a mid tone. For example, mǐ 'we, you', phonemically high-tone /bĩ́/ but phonetically rising because of the voiced consonant, is generally mid-tone [mĩ̄] in Ouidah.

== Orthographies ==
=== Roman alphabet ===
The Fon alphabet is based on the Latin alphabet, with the addition of the letters Ɖ/ɖ, Ɛ/ɛ, and Ɔ/ɔ, and the digraphs gb, hw, kp, ny, and xw.

Fon alphabet
Majuscule	A	B	C	D	Ɖ	E	Ɛ	F	G	GB	H	HW	I	J	K	KP	L	M	N	NY	O	Ɔ	P	R	S	T	U	V	W	X	XW	Y	Z
Minuscule	a	b	c	d	ɖ	e	ɛ	f	g	gb	h	hw	i	j	k	kp	l	m	n	ny	o	ɔ	p	r	s	t	u	v	w	x	xw	y	z
Sound (IPA)	a	b	t͡ɕ	d	ɖ	e	ɛ	f	ɡ	ɡb	ɣ	ɣʷ	i	d͡ʑ	k	kp	l	m	n	ɲ	o	ɔ	p	r	s	t	u	v	w	x	xʷ	j	z

==== Tone marking ====
Tones are marked as follows:

- Acute accent marks the rising tone: xó, dó
- Grave accent marks the falling tone: ɖò, akpàkpà
- Caron marks falling and rising tone: bǔ, bǐ
- Circumflex accent marks the rising and falling tone: côfù
- Macron marks the neutral tone: kān

Tones are fully marked in reference books, but not always marked in other writing. The tone marking is phonemic, and the actual pronunciation may be different according to the syllable's environment.

=== Gbékoun script ===
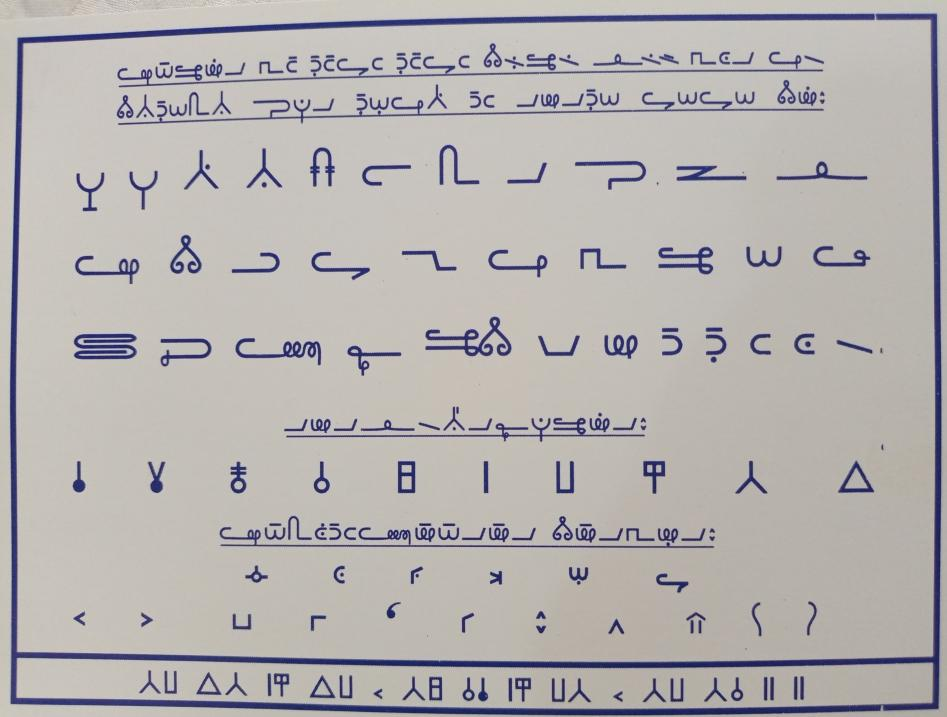
Table of Gbékoun script

Speakers in Benin also use a distinct script called Gbékoun that was invented by Togbédji Adigbè. It has 24 consonants and 9 vowels, as it is intended to transcribe all the languages of Benin.

== Sample text ==
From the Universal Declaration of Human Rights

Acɛ, susu kpo sisi ɖokpo ɔ kpo wɛ gbɛtɔ bi ɖo ɖò gbɛwiwa tɔn hwenu; ye ɖo linkpɔn bɔ ayi yetɔn mɛ kpe lo bɔ ye ɖo na do alɔ yeɖee ɖi nɔvinɔvi ɖɔhun.
Translation
All human beings are born free and equal in dignity and rights. They are endowed with reason and conscience and should act towards one another in a spirit of brotherhood.

== Use ==
Radio programs in Fon are broadcast on ORTB channels.

Television programs in Fon are shown on the La Beninoise satellite TV channel.

French used to be the only language of education in Benin, but in the second decade of the twenty-first century, the government is experimenting with teaching some subjects in Benin schools in the country's local languages, among them Fon.

== Machine translation efforts ==
There is an effort to create a machine translator for Fon (to and from French), by Bonaventure Dossou (from Benin) and Chris Emezue (from Nigeria). Their project is called FFR. It uses phrases from Jehovah's Witnesses sermons as well as other biblical phrases as the research corpus to train a Natural Language Processing (NLP) neural net model.

== Bibliography ==
- Höftmann, Hildegard; Ahohounkpanzon, Michel (2003). Dictionnaire fon-français : avec une esquisse grammaticale. Köln: Rüdiger Köppe Verlag. ISBN 3896454633. OCLC 53005906.
