= Lycée Jacques Moudeïna =

School in Bongor, Chad

- Established: 1942
- Type: Public high school
- Location: Bongor, Chad

The Lycée Jacques Moudeïna is a public educational institution located in Bongor, Chad.

== History ==
Created in 1942, it is considered the first higher education school of French Equatorial Africa located outside of Brazzaville. It later became a college and then the first high school in Chad.

== Notable alumni ==
- Idriss Deby Itno
