= Dèmè =

- Arrondissement and town
- Location in Benin
- Country: Benin
- Department: Oueme Department
- Commune: Adjohoun
- Time zone: UTC+1 (WAT)

Dèmè is a small town and arrondissement located in the commune of Adjohoun in the Oueme Department of Benin. Agriculture is the main industry lying in the fertile Ouémé River Valley of southern Benin. During the 2008 Benin floods, the area was affected by the flooding of the Ouémé River which affected much of Adjohoun commune.
