= Adjohoun =

- Commune and city
- Location in Benin
- Coordinates: 6°42′N 2°28′E
- Country: Benin
- Department: Ouémé Department
- Commune: Adjohoun

Area
  - Total: 308 km^{2} (119 sq mi)

Population (2002)
  - Total: 60,955
  - Density: 198/km^{2} (513/sq mi)

Adjohoun [a.dʒo.un] or Adjohon [a.dʒɔ.ɔ̃] is a town, arrondissement, and commune in Ouémé Department, Benin. The commune is divided into 8 arrondissements and 57 villages. The commune of Adjohoun is located approximately 32 km from Porto-Novo and 62 km from Cotonou. The commune covers an area of 308 km^{2} and as of 2002 had a population of 60,955, 48.14% male and 51.86% female. The commune covers an area of 112 square kilometres and as of 2002 had a population of 60,112 people.

== Geography ==
Adjohoun is located in the Ouémé River valley. It is a fertile area in which agricultural pastures dominate.

== Administration ==
The commune is divided into 8 arrondissements. These are Adjohoun, Awonou, Azowlissé, Dèmè, Gangban, Kogé and Togbota. The City Council is composed of 15 advisers who elect the mayor, who is currently Leon Bokova. A former mayor is Gerard Adounsiba. The District Council is composed of 13 advisers who elect the Chief District.

== Economy ==
Crops grown include maize, rice, potatoes, sesame, tomatoes, oranges and bananas. Fishing is also one of the main industries.
