= Aguégués =

- Commune and city
- Location in Benin
- Coordinates: 6°29′N 2°32′E
- Country: Benin
- Department: Ouémé Department

Area
  - Total: 20 sq mi (52 km^{2})

Population (2002)
  - Total: 26,650
- Time zone: UTC+1 (WAT)

Aguégués [a.ge.ge] is a town and commune in the Ouémé Department of south-eastern Benin. The commune covers an area of 52 square kilometres and as of 2002 had a population of 26,650 people.

== Geography ==
Aguégués is a lakeside community made up of submersible earth islands in the lower part of the Ouémé River. It extends for 103 kilometres. Every year from the period of July to November, the entire community is flooded and becomes a lakeside.

Aguégués has a population of 44,562 inhabitants (according to the 4th RGPH) and currently managed by GANDONOU Marc has 23 villages in the 3 districts of Avagbodji, Houédomè and Zoungamè. It is bounded to the north by the municipalities of Dangbo and Akpro-Missérété, to the south by Lake Nokoué and the municipality of Sèmè-Podji, to the east by the lagoon of Porto-Novo and the city of Porto-Novo and to the west by Lake Nokoué, but from its strategic point of view, it is located on the swamp lagoons, lake and river routes that connect the country's two largest metropolises: Porto-Novo (Benin's political capital) and Cotonou, economic capital. It is 6 km from the first and 15 km from the second. The same lagoon chain continues continuously eastward to Badagry and Lagos in Nigeria. As a result, "Aguégués" is a mandatory passage for most lagoon and river traffic (on the Ouémé River) between the Porto-Novo lagoon and Lake Nokoué in Cotonou.

== History ==
Aguégués has its origins with traces to the 17th century, when it was settled by a community of ethnic groups. The Toffinous were the first settlers and the Ouémènous who came after.

For the Djêviénou people, their first descendant was Soholou Linzé-Agban. Oral traditions suggest he reportedly settled in Ahouansori Agué (present-day Sainte Cécile district of Cotonou) and then in Sô-Ava, a lake locality (now a commune of Sô-Ava) where he had set up a hunting and fishing camp (Ava). He later met Tê-Agbanlin, the founder of Hogbonou.

Two friends, after staying in Sô-Ava for a while, headed for Porto-Novo. While Tê-Agbanlin moved to Porto-Novo where he built a house called "Hogbonou". Soholou, to stay close to Tê-Agbalin and continue his hunting and fishing activities, in turn took up residence on the current site of Les Agués where he found Amoussou Aguégué (son of Vakon's chief) on his arrival. The Dankonou community is made up of the descendants of Gnancadja Zounhon, a friend of hunter Amoussou Aguégué (who is believed to be the son of a village chief of Vakon in the municipality of Akpro-Missérété). According to the history supported by this community, the territory of the Agués was founded by Gnancadja Zounhon, their eponymous ancestor. The latter would also have come directly from Adja-Tado more precisely from Sogbonouhoué by fleeing fratricidal conflicts.

Gnancadja Zounhon and one of his Todjinou brothers settled in the west in Sowè (Houédogbadji) and then in Dékanmè (two localities in the municipality of Sô-Ava). From Dékanmè, Gnancadja will settle on a larger islet east of the "Sô" river that he called "Zonungbo-Fonsa" (on the right bank of the Aguégués but close to Dékanmè). The latter, while hunting, came to find Amoussou Aguégués at the place called Kogboho (now a public square called Sohonto). Gnacadja Zounhon married Gbassègbo, sister of Amoussou Aguégué. In memory of his son-in-law, Gnancadja Zounhon consecrated the locality to which he gave the name "Aguégué".

The second group, the Ouémènous would later have come from Abomey fleeing the attacks of the King of Abomey in the first half of the 18th century. They were led by Zoungla and his companions Houndagnon, Ahésou, Houénou, Atchassou, Assin and settled in Avagbodji district. Some Ouémènous later settled in the village of Agbodjèdo in the district of Houédomè.

== Tourism ==
Aguégués is located on a watery highway of canoes and motorised boats. The lake around the village features stilts and is home to a variety of Beninese wildlife. Tourist attractions in Aguégués include:

- African manatee cottage
- Bamèzoun Forest
- Goukou and Sohonto Square
- Wandja Bush
- Soholou Palace
- Wreck of warships

== Festivals ==
Every year, the inhabitants of Aguégués celebrate Wémèxé, an identity festival of the Oumé department.
