= Education in Benin =

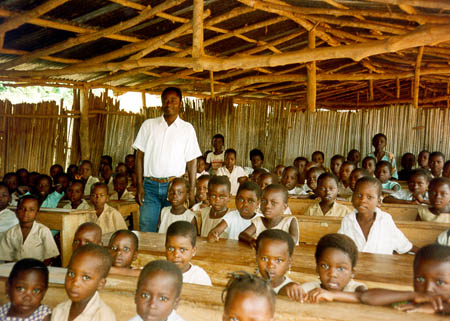
Teacher with students in a classroom in Benin.

Benin has abolished school fees and is carrying out the recommendations of its 2007 Educational Forum. (Its education system used not to be free.) In 2018, the net primary enrollment rate was 97 percent. Gross enrollment rate in secondary education has greatly increased in the last two decades, from 21.8 percent in 2000 to 59 percent in 2016, 67.1 percent in the case of males and 50.7 percent for females. Because of a rapid increase in the enrollment rate, the student/teacher ratio rose from 36:1 in 1990 to 53:1 in 1997 but has dropped again in the last years to 39:1 (2018). In 2018, the gross enrollment ratio in tertiary education was 12.5%.

The overall adult literacy rate is 42.4 percent (2018), significantly lower than in neighbors Togo (63.7%) and Nigeria (62%). Only 31.1% of women in Benin 15 years or older are literate, although this number increases to 51.9% for the 15-24 year olds (69.8% for men).

The Human Rights Measurement Initiative (HRMI) finds that Benin is fulfilling only 77.6% of what it should be fulfilling for the right to education based on the country's level of income. HRMI breaks down the right to education by looking at the rights to both primary education and secondary education. While taking into consideration Benin's income level, the nation is achieving 96.5% of what should be possible based on its resources (income) for primary education but only 58.8% for secondary education.

== History ==
By the late 1980s, under Benin's Marxist government, the quality of education was seriously eroded. By 1989, the education system was in a state of collapse. A key event in the reform of education in Benin was the national Conference on Education (Etats Généraux de l'Education, EGE) held in 1990 which adopted a national policy and strategy to improve education. Beginning in 1991, the government of Benin introduced significant changes in the Beninese education system.

Major advances have been made in education, especially in the areas of access and teaching/learning conditions. The gross enrollment rate has increased from a base of 49.7% in 1990 to 96% in 2004 and girls' enrollment from 36% in 1990 to 84% in 2004. Gender balance and geographic equity have shown significant improvements in gross numbers of girls and children from disadvantaged areas attending primary schools. Nonetheless, major constraints and challenges remain.

== School system ==
The Republic of Benin operates on a 6-4-3-3-4 system:

- Primary school: 6 years
- Junior high school: 4 years
- Senior high school: 3 years
- Bachelor's degree: 3 years
- Master's degree: 4 years

Education is compulsory for children between ages six and eleven. After spending two to three years in kindergarten, it takes six years for them to complete and take the primary school certificate. It requires seven years to complete junior and senior high school. At the end of the four first years of junior high school, the students have to take the O-level (Brevet d’Etudes du Premier Cycle: BEPC). After three years the students have to take the A level (Baccalauréat: BAC) exam which is the equivalent of the U.S. high school diploma.

There are vocational schools in the following provinces: Atlantique littoral (city of Cotonou), Oueme Plateau (city of Porto-Novo), Zou Colline (city of Bohicon) Borgou (city of Parakou), Mono Couffo, Atakora, Donga and Alibori.

== Grading system ==
The grading system is from 0 to 20, with 20 being the highest.

- Passing grade: 10
- Fairly good grade: 12
- Good grade: 14-15
- Very good grade: 16-17
- Excellent: 18-20

== Languages of instruction ==
French, the official language of Benin, is generally the language of instruction.

== Leading public high schools ==
Cotonou:

- High School of Gbegamey
- High School of St Rita
- High School of Dantokpa
- High School of Akpakpa

Porto-Novo:

- Lycee Behanzin
- Lycee Toffa

High School of Application:

- High School of Lokossa
- High School of Houffon
- High School of Mathieu Bouquet (Borgou)
- High School of CEG1 Natitingou (Atakora)
- High School of Djougou (Donga)

== Higher education ==
The government has devoted more than 4% of GDP to education since 2009. In 2015, public expenditure amounted to 4.4% of GDP, according to the UNESCO Institute for Statistics. Within total education expenditure, Benin devotes quite a large share to higher education: 0.97% of GDP in 2015.

Between 2009 and 2011, the share of young people enrolled at university rose from 10% to 12% of the 18-25 age cohort, one of the highest ratios in West Africa. Student enrollment in tertiary education doubled between 2006 and 2011 from 50,225 to 110,181. These statistics encompass not only bachelor's, master's and PhD programmes but also non-degree post-secondary education.

The National University of Benin system maintains ten branches:

- The Campus of Abomey Calavi
  - The Faculty of Economics and Management (FASEG)
  - The Faculty of Law and Political Science (FADESP)
  - The Faculty of Arts and Social Science (FLASH)
  - The Faculty of Science and Technology (FAST)
  - The Faculty of Health Science (FSS)
- The University of Parakou (UNIPAR)
- The School of Applied Economics and Management (ENEAM)
- The National School of Administration and Prosecutor Training (ENAM)
- The Poly Technical School of Abomey Calavi (EPAC)
- The Teachers’ Training School of Porto-Novo (ENS)
  - The Institute of Mathematics and Physics (IMSP)
  - The Faculty Agricultural Science (FSA)
  - America Benin (AB)

Each branch is headed by a university president.

Some private higher institutions are accredited by the Ministry of National Education. Altogether 94 higher institutions are accredited.

=== Grading system for thesis defense ===
- Passing: 10-12
- Fairly good grade: 12
- Good grade: 14-15
- Very good grade: 16-17
- Excellent grade: 18-20

=== Leading private universities ===
- IRGIB
- African School of Economics (ASE)
- PIGIER
- GASA FORMATION
- UCAO
- UPIB
- ESGT-Benin
- ASSI University
- IRSBAC.COM PARAKO
- UPAO
- i-Fatoss University
- African University of Bénin Republic
