= Kogé =

- Arrondissement and town
- Location in Benin
- Coordinates: 6.753°N 2.480°E
- Country: Benin
- Department: Borgou Department
- Commune: Adjohoun
- Time zone: UTC+1 (WAT)

Kogé is a small town and arrondissement located in the commune of Adjohoun in the Borgou Department of Benin. It lies in the fertile Ouémé River valley, where agriculture is the main industry. In 2008 during the 2008 Benin floods, the area was affected by the flooding of the Ouémé River which affected much of Adjohoun commune.
