= Berdoba =

Village in Ennedi, Chad

Berdoba بيردوبا
- Location in Chad
- Coordinates: 16°1′31″N 22°52′50″E
- Country: Chad
- Region: Ennedi-Est
- Department: Wadi Hawar
- Time zone: +1

Berdoba is a village in the Ennedi-Est region of Chad. It is the birthplace of former president Idriss Déby.
