= Avrankou =

- Commune and city
- Location in Benin
- Coordinates: 6°33′N 2°40′E
- Country: Benin
- Department: Ouémé Department

Area
  - Total: 58 sq mi (150 km^{2})

Population (2013)
  - Total: 128,050
- Time zone: UTC+1 (WAT)

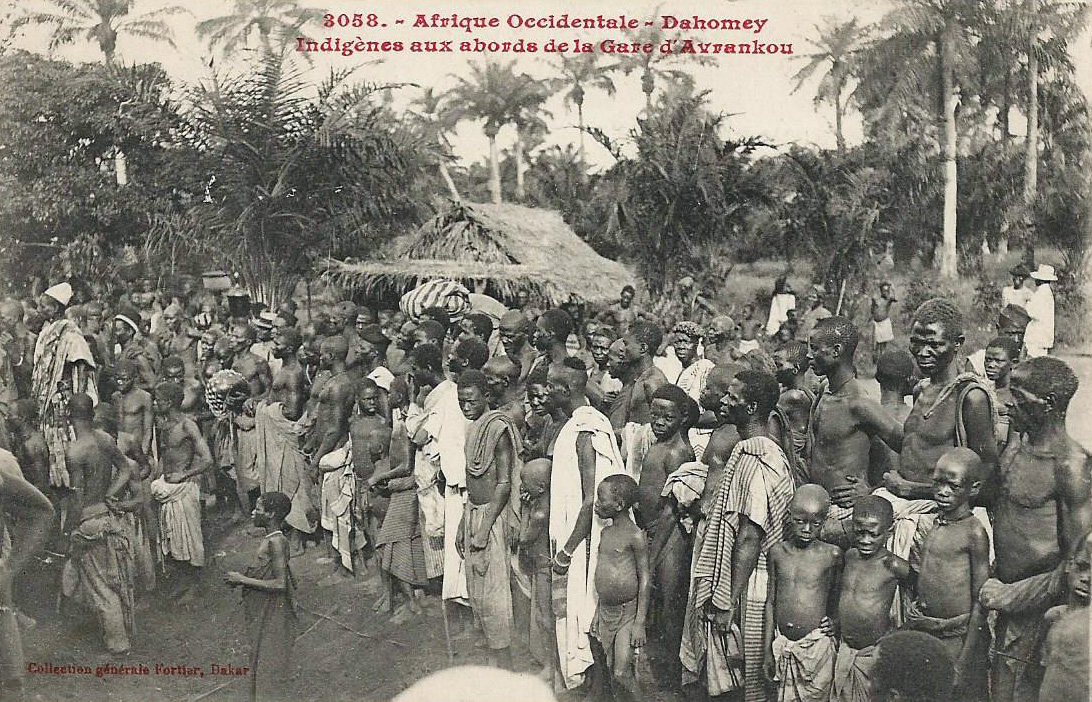
Individuals near the Avrankou train station. West Africa. Dahomey

Avrankou [av.ʁɑ̃ŋ.ku] is a town, arrondissement, and commune in the Ouémé Department of south-eastern Benin. The commune covers an area of 150 square kilometres and as of 2013 had a population of 128,050 people.

Avrankou is home to a constituent monarchy, currently led by Latchè Holou Guidimadégbé.
