= Gangban =

Coordinates: 6.6944°N 2.5075°E

- Village and town
- Interactive map of Gangban
- Country: Benin
- Department: Zou Department
- Commune: Ouinhi
- Time zone: UTC+1 (WAT)

Gangban is a village in Benin, the seat of the Tohouè arrondissement located in the commune of Ouinhi in the Zou Department. Agriculture is the main industry lying in the fertile Ouémé River Valley of southern Benin.

== 2008 flooding ==
In 2008 during the 2008 Benin floods, the area was affected by the flooding of the Ouémé River which affected much of Ouinhi commune in September. Gangman was severely affected by the flooding and affected the start of the new school year. One local of Gangban reported, "The water has reached our necks in our community of Gangban. Homes are washed out. People have fled to try and find other places to stay in neighbouring communities. It is too much. If you don't have a little boat, you can't get around." Another reported that his father had "lost about seven hectares of his cropland".
