= Houffon High School =

Lycée Houffon Cours Normal d'Instituteurs d'Abomey
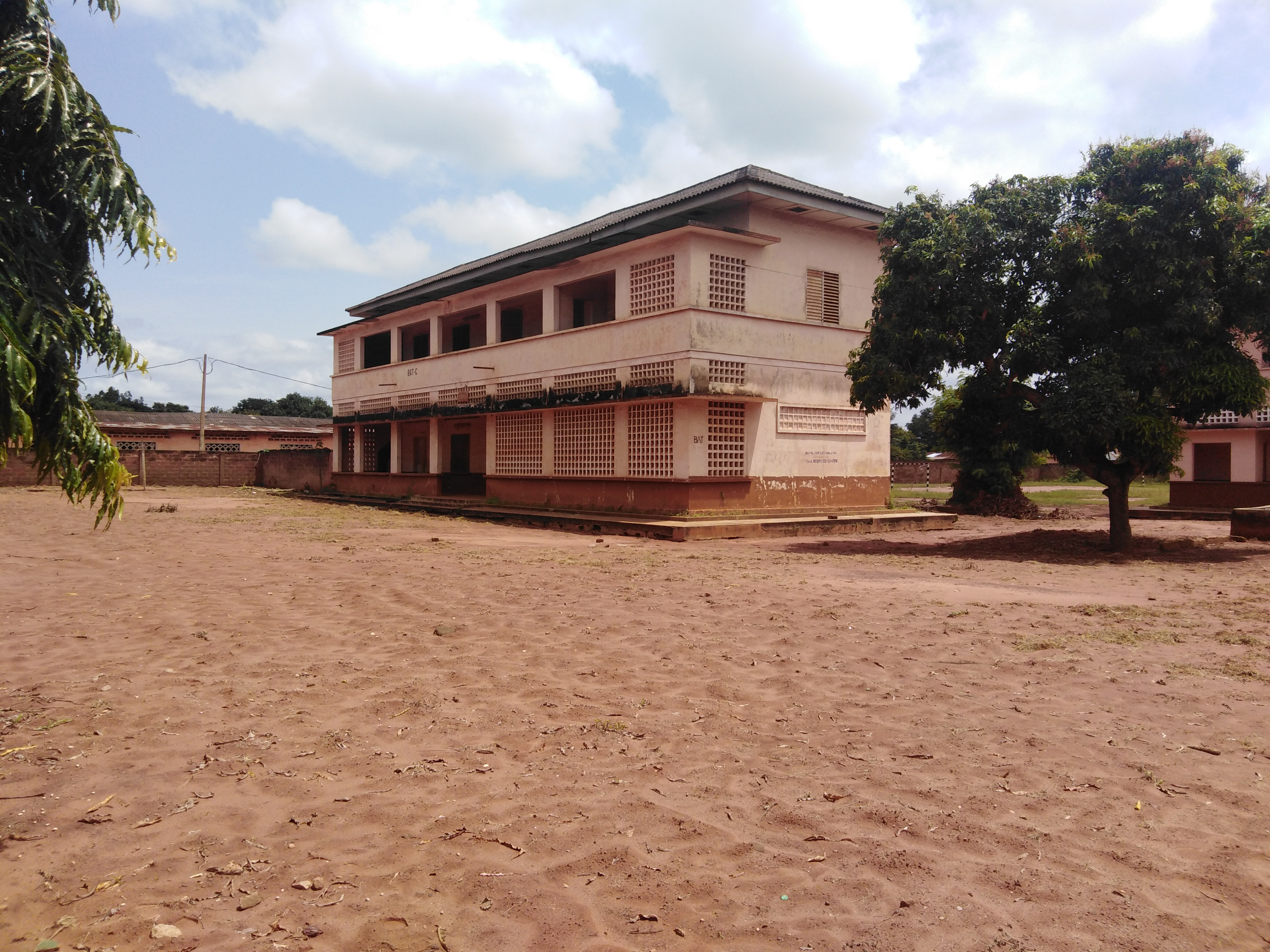
- Lycée Houffon D'Abomey

Location
- Benin
- Coordinates: 7.18718°N 1.98895°E

Information
- Established: 1921

Houffon High School, formerly known as Cours Normal d'Instituteurs d'Abomey, is a public secondary school in Benin, created in 1921.

== History ==
Created in 1921 under the name Cours Normal d'Instituteurs d'Abomey, this colonial building was later renamed Houffon High School. At the time, the school was modeled after the William Ponty School in Gorée, and it welcomed not only student teachers from Dahomey but also from other colonies of French West Africa. Since 1996, the building has been named Lycée Houffon - Foyer des Jeunes Filles and is under the supervision of the Ministry of Secondary, Technical, and Vocational Education.

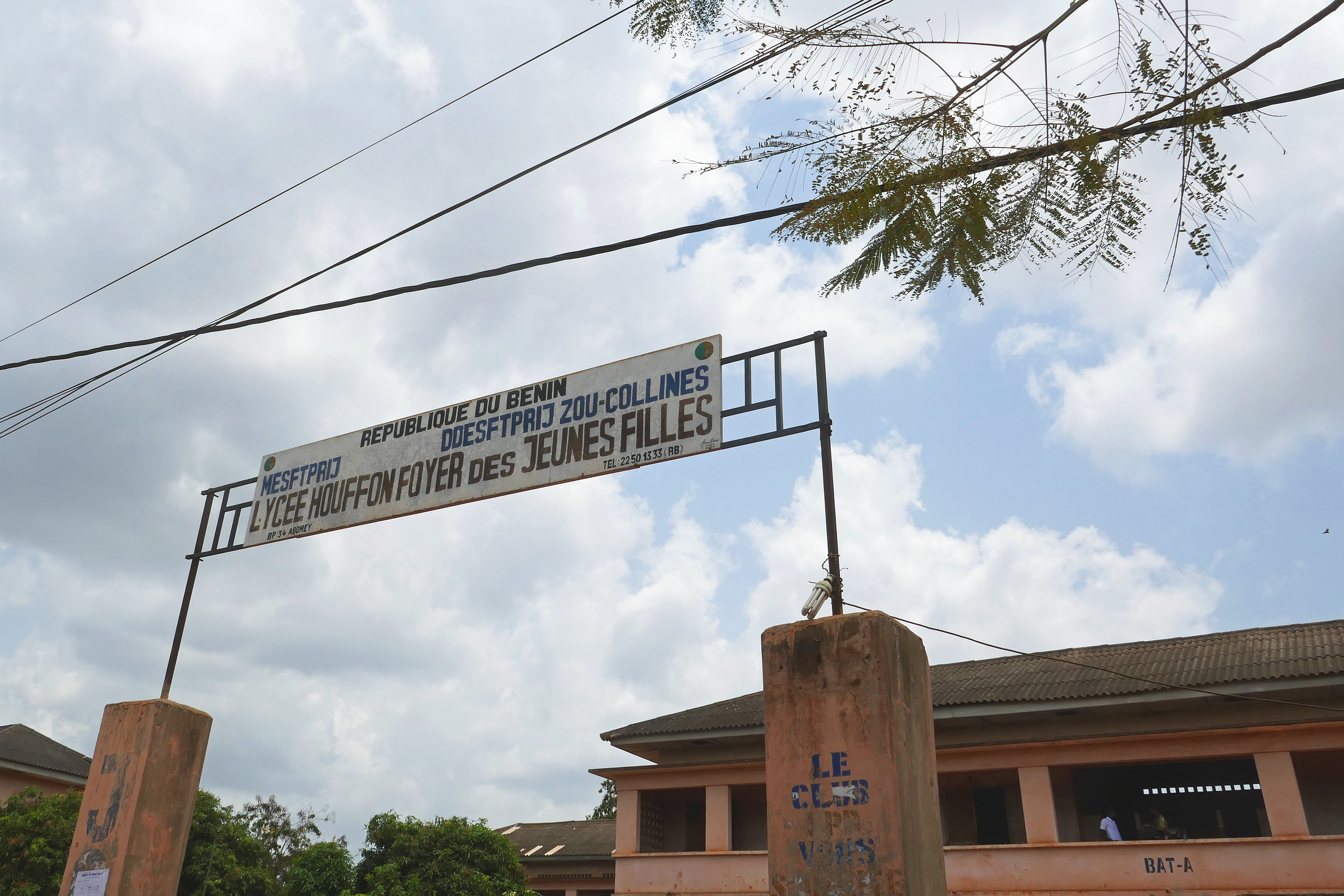
Abomey-Lycée Houffon-Foyer des Jeunes Filles

== See also ==
- Lycée agricole Mèdji de Sékou
- Lycée Béhanzin
- Lycée Toffa 1er
- Lycée Technique Coulibaly de Cotonou
