= Adjarra =

- Commune and city
- Location in Benin
- Coordinates: 6°32′N 2°40′E
- Country: Benin
- Department: Ouémé Department
- Commune: Adjarra

Area
  - Total: 112 km^{2} (43 sq mi)

Population (2013)
  - Total: 97,424

Adjarra [a.dʒa.ʁa] is a town and commune in Ouémé Department, Benin.The commune covers an area of 112 square kilometres and as of 2013 had a population of 97,424 people.
