= Bonou =

- Commune and city
- Location in Benin
- Coordinates: 6°54′N 2°27′E
- Country: Benin
- Department: Ouémé Department

Area
  - Total: 106 sq mi (275 km^{2})

Population (2013)
  - Total: 44,349
- Time zone: UTC+1 (WAT)

Bonou [bɔ.nu] is a town, arrondissement, and commune in the Ouémé Department of south-eastern Benin. The commune covers an area of 275 square kilometres and as of 2013 had a population of 44,349 people.
