= Doba Basin =

Sedimentary basin in Chad

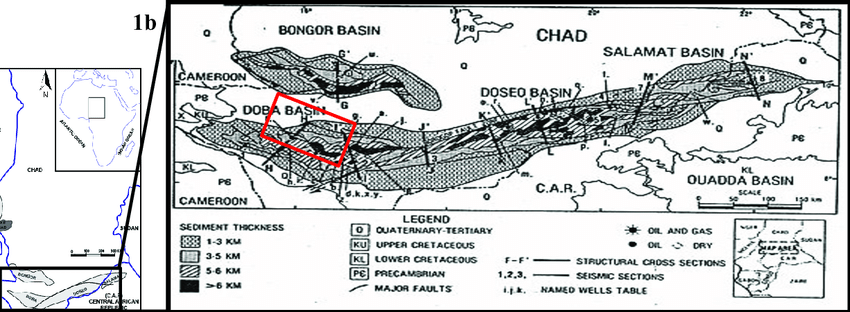
Topography image of Doba Basin.

The Doba Basin is a sedimentary basin located in Chad and is part of the Central African rift system. This basin contains up to 10 km of non-marine sediments which record the complex tectonic and climatic evolution of the region from the Early Cretaceous Period to the present. These basins were originally identified using gravity data, but three decades of subsequent exploration activity has significantly increased understanding of the basins evolution. Interpretations differ significantly from earlier models that invoke widespread misinformation. The basins were sites of extension on a trans-African shear zone beginning in the Neocomian.

The basin is used in a joint development venture between ExxonMobil, Petronas and Chevron-Texaco, which formed a partnership for the construction of the Chad-Cameroon pipeline.
