= Akpro-Missérété =

- Commune and city
- Location in Benin
- Coordinates: 6°33′45″N 2°35′7″E
- Country: Benin
- Department: Ouémé Department
- Commune: Akpro-Missérété

Area
  - Total: 79 km^{2} (31 sq mi)

Population (2013)
  - Total: 127,249

Akpro-Missérété [ak.pʁɔ.mi.se.ʁe.te] is a city, arrondissement, and commune in Ouémé Department, Benin. The commune covers an area of 79 square kilometres and as of 2013 had a population of 127,249 people.
