= Sèmè-Kpodji =

- Commune and city
- Location in Benin
- Coordinates: 6°22′N 2°37′E
- Country: Benin
- Department: Ouémé Department

Area
  - Total: 97 sq mi (250 km^{2})

Population (2013)
  - Total: 222,701
- Time zone: UTC+1 (WAT)

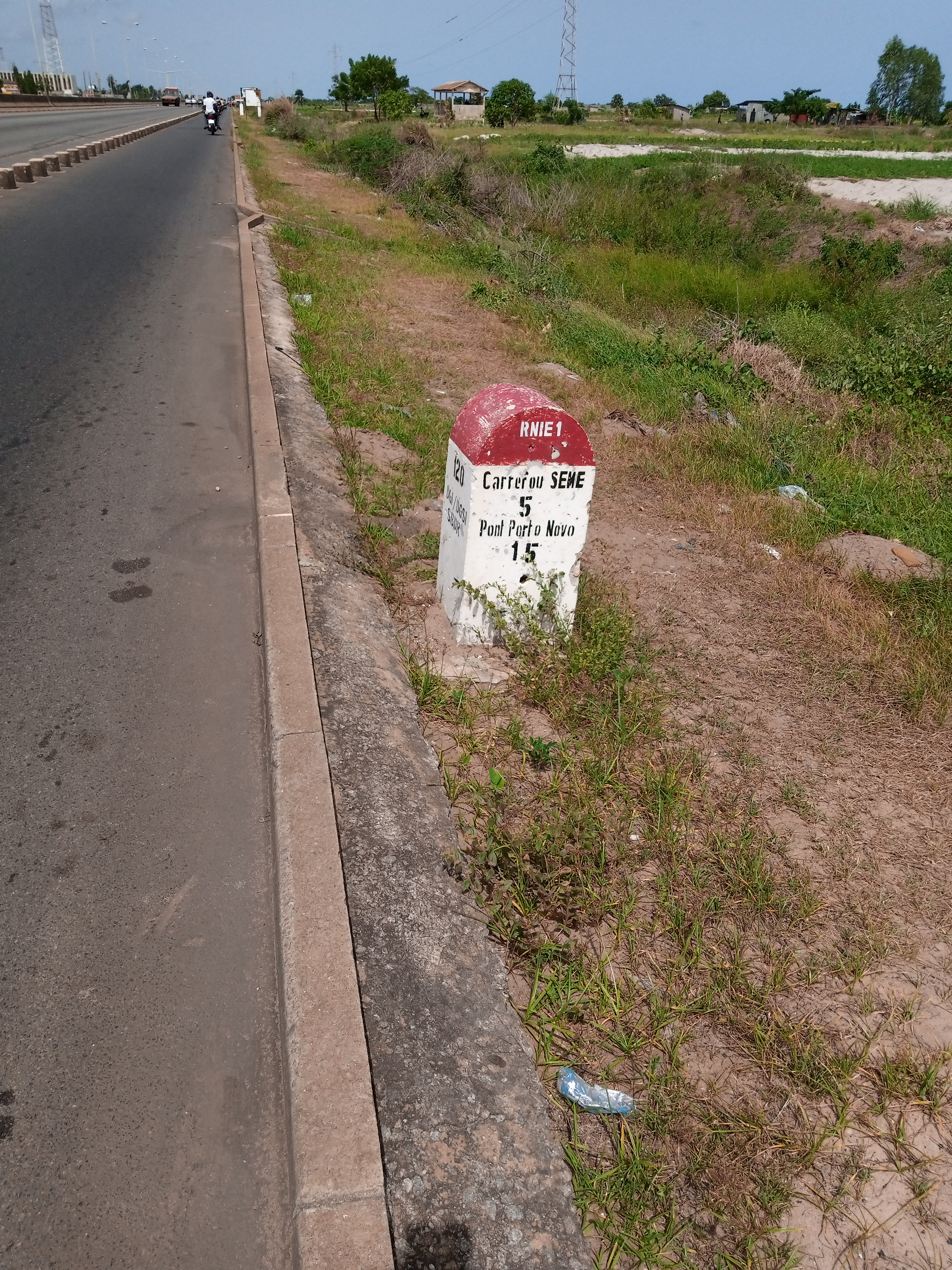
Milestone on RNIE 1

Sèmè-Kpodji [sɛ.mɛ.kpɔ.dʒi] is a town, arrondissement, and commune in the Ouémé Department of south-eastern Benin. The commune covers an area of 250 square kilometres and as of 2013 had a population of 222,701 people. The port of Sèmè is home to the oil terminal of the Niger–Benin Oil Pipeline, the longest pipeline in Africa.
