= Dangbo =

- Commune and city
- Location in Benin
- Coordinates: 6°30′N 2°41′E
- Country: Benin
- Department: Ouémé Department

Area
  - Total: 130 sq mi (340 km^{2})

Population (2002)
  - Total: 66,055
- Time zone: UTC+1 (WAT)

Dangbo [dɑ̃ŋ.bo] is a town, arrondissement, and commune in the Ouémé Department of south-eastern Benin.The commune covers an area of 340 square kilometres and as of 2002 had a population of 66,055 people. Dangbo is the site of Benin's Institute for Mathematics and Physical Sciences.

== History ==
Dangbo is inhabited by the Wéménou people who constitute the bulk of its population. The Wéménou are an ethnic group that can be found today in the former administrative subdivision of Adjohoun, then stretching from Damey-Wogon to Gbodjè (Aguégués). It was split in 1978 into four (04) administrative districts which are: Bonou, Adjohoun, Dangbo, Aguégués. These populations lead a life punctuated by the presence of the Ouémé river, and share a common set of linguistic signs called Wémégbé. They are refugees made up of composite groups from the east: the Yoruba (the Tosso, the Glô, the Fênou, the Kénou, the Fongninou from the West, the Hounhouênou, the Houêdonou, and the Houédo-Sadonou from Fon-Adja language, from the North-West: the very important group of Wéménou proper descendant of an emblematic ancestor: Togbo-Hounsou who came to the Ouémé River Basin following their unexpected defeat in the hands of the soldiers of the Kingdom of Dahomey.
