= Ouémé Department =

Department of Benin

Ouémé
- Department
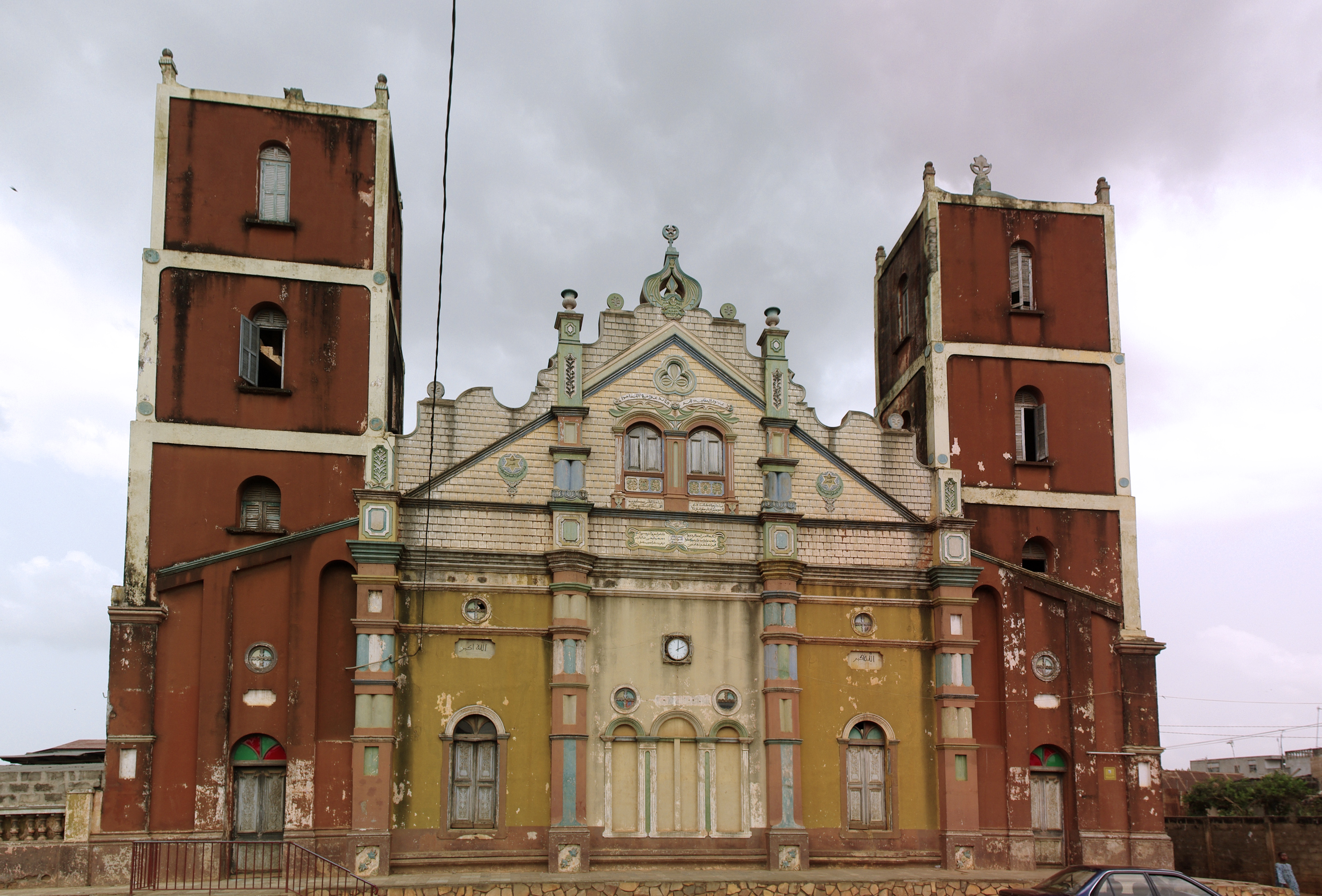
- Grande mosque in Porto-Novo, Benin

- Map highlighting the Ouémé Department
- Coordinates: 6°30′N 2°36′E
- Country: Benin
- Capital: Porto-Novo

Area
  - Total: 1,281 km^{2} (495 sq mi)

Population (2013 census)
  - Total: 1,096,850
  - Density: 856.2/km^{2} (2,218/sq mi)
- Time zone: UTC+1 (WAT)

Ouémé [we.me] is one of the twelve departments of Benin, containing the capital of the country Porto-Novo, named for the Ouémé River. It is subdivided into nine communes, each centred at one of the principal towns: Adjarra, Adjohoun, Aguégués, Akpro-Missérété, Avrankou, Bonou, Dangbo, Porto-Novo and Sèmè-Kpodji. In 1999, the northern section of Ouémé was split off to form the department of Plateau.

As of 2013, the total population of the department was 1,100,404, with 534,814 males and 565,590 females. The proportion of women was 51.40%. The total rural population was 37.20%, while the urban population was 62.80%. The total labor force in the department was 383,716, of which 49.50% were women. The proportion of households with no level of education was 43.80% and the proportion of households with children attending school was 81.70%.

== Geography ==
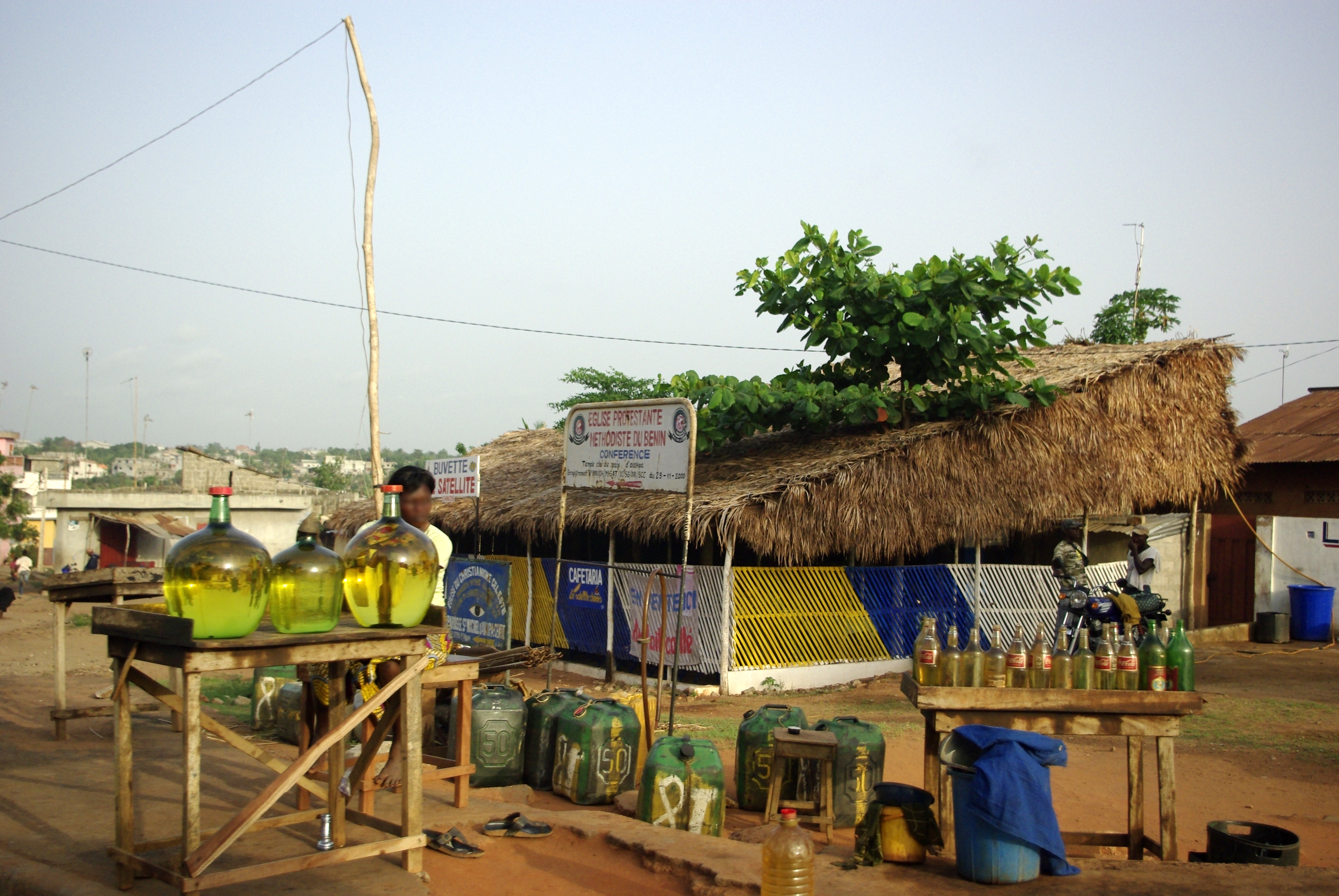
A market in Porto-Novo

Ouémé Department borders Zou Department to the north, Plateau Department to the northeast, Nigeria to the southeast, the Atlantic Ocean to the south, Littoral Department to the southwest, and Atlantique Department to the west. It is located in a coastal area that has interconnected lakes and lagoons and elongated coastlines with wide marshes. The southern regions of Benin receive two spells of rain from March to July and September to November, while the northern regions of the country receive one season of rainfall from May to September. The country receives an average annual rainfall of around 1,200 mm (47 in), but Ouémé Department receives less rainfall. The department has mostly low-lying sandy coastal plains towards the Atlantic Ocean, marshes, lagoons and lakes, including part of Lake Nokoué in the southwest. The highest elevation in the department around the coastal plains is 20 m (66 ft) compared to the average 200 m (660 ft) above average mean sea level of the country.

=== Settlements ===
Porto-Novo is the departmental capital (as well as the capital of Benin as a whole); other major settlements include Adjarra, Adjohoun, Affamè, Aguégués, Avrankou, Bonou, Ekpè and Sèmè-Kpodji.

== Economy ==
Freshwater and seawater fishing is the major profession in the region. Petroleum was discovered in the 1960s in offshore areas, while titanium, low quality iron ore, ilmenite and chromite are the major minerals.

== Demographics ==
Religious census
Religion	Percent(%)
Vodoun	59%
Catholic	34.6%
Celestial Church	17.4%
Muslim	12.1%
Other Christian	8.3%
Methodist	7.8%
Other Protestant	7.7%
Other Traditional	0.6%
Other	2.3%

According to Benin's 2013 census, the total population of the department was 1,100,404, with 534,814 males and 565,590 females. The proportion of women was 51.40%. The total rural population was 37.20%, while the urban population was 62.80%. The proportion of women of childbearing age (15 to 49 years old) was 24.80%. The foreign population was 17,065, representing 1.60% of the department's total population. The labour force participation rate among foreigners aged 15–64 years was 37.60%. The proportion of women among the foreign population constituted 51.40%. The number of households in the department was 232,620 and the average household size was 4.7. The intercensal growth rate of the population was 3.70%.

Among women, the average age of first marriage was 21.7 and the average age at maternity was 28.7. The synthetic index of fertility of women was 4.6. The average number of families per house was 1.2 and the average number of persons per room was 2.1. The total labour force in the department was 383,716, of which 49.50% were women. The proportion of households with no level of education was 43.80% and the proportion of households with children attending school was 81.70%. The crude birth rate was 36.7, the general rate of fertility was 148.20 and the gross reproduction rate was 2.20.

The main ethnolinguistic groups in the department include the Ayizo, Ede, Fon, Gun, Phla (or 'Xwla'), Tofin and Yoruba.

== Administrative divisions ==
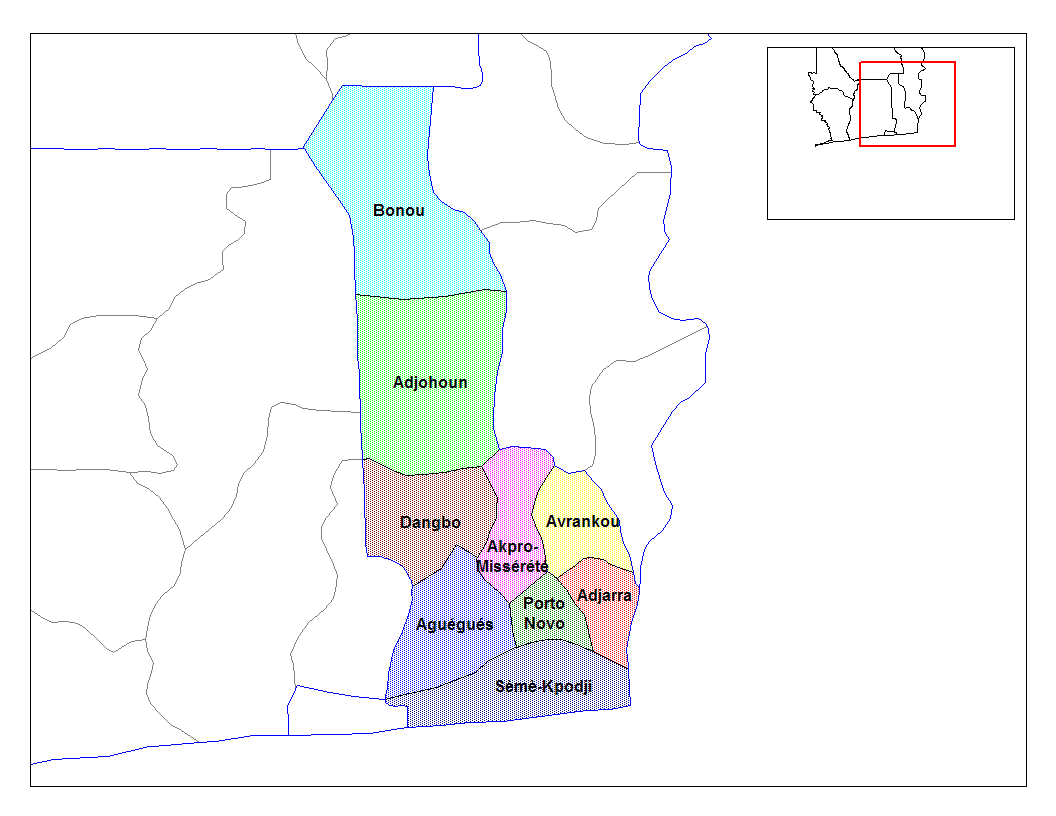
Communes of Ouémé

In 1999, the department of Plateau was split off from Ouémé, reducing Ouémé's area to 1,865 square kilometres (720 sq mi). Ouémé is subdivided into nine communes, each centered at one of the principal towns: Adjarra, Adjohoun, Aguégués, Akpro-Missérété, Avrankou, Bonou, Dangbo, Porto-Novo and Sèmè-Kpodji.

Benin originally had six administrative regions (départements), which have now been bifurcated to make 12. Each of the deconcentrated administrative services (directions départementales) of the sectoral ministries takes care of two administrative regions. A law passed in 1999 transformed the sous-prefectures, the lowest level of territorial administration, into local governments. Municipalities and communal councils have elected representatives who manage the administration of the regions. The latest elections of the municipal and communal councils were held in June 2015.
