= C20H18O8 =

The molecular formula C_{20}H_{18}O_{8} (molar mass: 386.35 g/mol, exact mass: 386.100159 u) may refer to:

- Diferulic acids (for instance 8,5'-diferulic acid)
- Arboreol, an epoxylignan
- Gummadiol, a lignan hemiacetal
