= Gmelinol =

Names
- IUPAC name 3,6-Bis(3,4-dimethoxyphenyl)-3,4,6,6a-tetrahydro-1H-furo[3,4-c]furan-3a-ol
- Other names Isogmelinol

Identifiers
CAS Number	469-28-3
3D model (JSmol)	Interactive image
ChEBI	CHEBI:193020
ChEMBL	ChEMBL151210
ChemSpider	5028539
PubChem CID	235321
UNII	BX2Y2S5M5Y
- InChI: InChI=1S/C22H26O7/c1-24-16-7-5-13(9-18(16)26-3)20-15-11-28-21(22(15,23)12-29-20)14-6-8-17(25-2)19(10-14)27-4/h5-10,15,20-21,23H,11-12H2,1-4H3 Key: MEIWPHMJWJAVIY-UHFFFAOYSA-N
- SMILES: COC1=C(C=C(C=C1)C2C3COC(C3(CO2)O)C4=CC(=C(C=C4)OC)OC)OC

Properties
Chemical formula	C_{22}H_{26}O_{7}
Molar mass	402.443 g·mol^{−1}
- Except where otherwise noted, data are given for materials in their standard state (at 25 °C [77 °F], 100 kPa). Infobox references

Gmelinol is a lignan. (+)-Gmelinol can be isolated from the heartwood of Gmelina arborea. This compound, along with four other chemicals also found in the same species, (+)-7′-O-ethyl arboreol, (+)-paulownin, (+)-epieudesmin and (−)-β-sitosterol, shows antifungal activity against Trametes versicolor.
