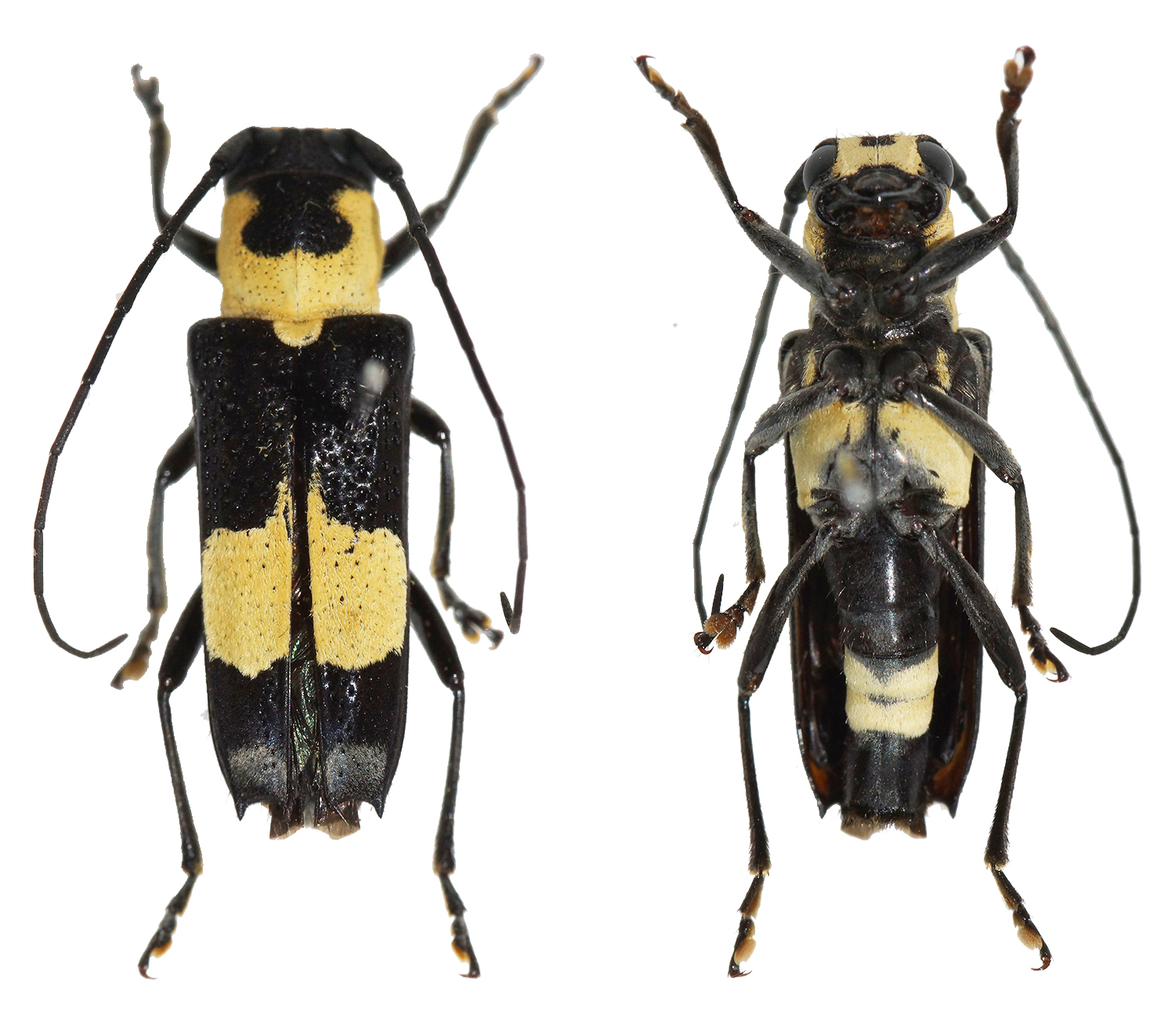

Scientific classification
- Domain: Eukaryota
- Kingdom: Animalia
- Phylum: Arthropoda
- Class: Insecta
- Order: Coleoptera
- Suborder: Polyphaga
- Infraorder: Cucujiformia
- Family: Cerambycidae
- Genus: Glenea
- Species: G. mouhoti

Binomial name
- Glenea mouhoti Thomson, 1865

Synonyms
- Glenea indiana var. cochinchinensis Breuning, 1956; Glenea indiana var. mouhoti Thomson, 1865

= Glenea mouhoti =

Species of beetle

Glenea mouhoti is a species of beetle in the family Cerambycidae. It was described by James Thomson in 1865. It is known from Laos, China, Vietnam, Cambodia, and Thailand. It feeds on Tectona grandis and Gmelina arborea.

== Subspecies ==
- Glenea mouhoti var. albodiversa.
