= C8H19NO2 =

The molecular formula C_{8}H_{19}NO_{2} may refer to:

- Ammonium caprylate
