= Achta Djibrine Sy =

Chadian peace activist and government minister

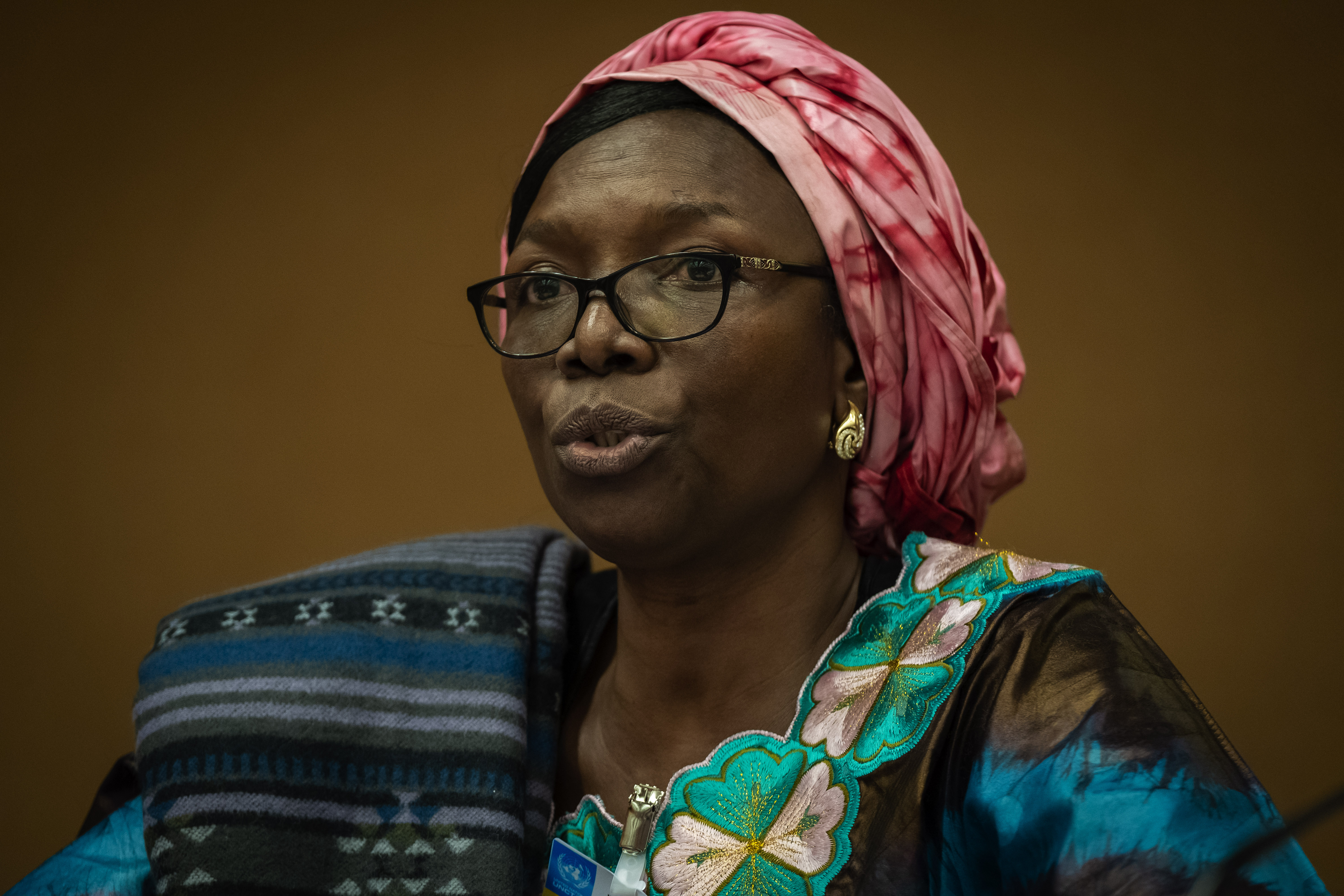
- in 2019
- Born: October 28, 1962 (age 64); Chad
- Occupation: membre de la société civile
- Known for: Ministre du commerce, de l'industrie et de la promotion du secteur privé for Chad
- Children: 06

Achta Djibrine Sy (born October 28, 1962) is a Chadian peace activist who became a government Minister of Commerce of Industry in 2019.

== Life ==
Sy was born in 1962 and obtained her first degree at the University of N'Djamena in management and economics. After the civil war in Chad, Sy worked with women's groups and the British charity Oxfam to facilitate peace in her country. She was Oxfam's Women's Project Officer in Chad. In 1993 she wrote about the role of women in Chad to assist Oxfam's policy. For more than 10 years, she represented Intermón Oxfam in her country.

In 2005 she was one of 1,000 women who featured in the book "1000 Peacewomen Across the Globe".

In 2014 Chad's national council of women (CONAF-TCHAD) was formed at the inspiration of the first lady Hinda Deby Itno. Sy became the vice-president of that organisation which campaigned against discrimination. Her term finished in 2017.

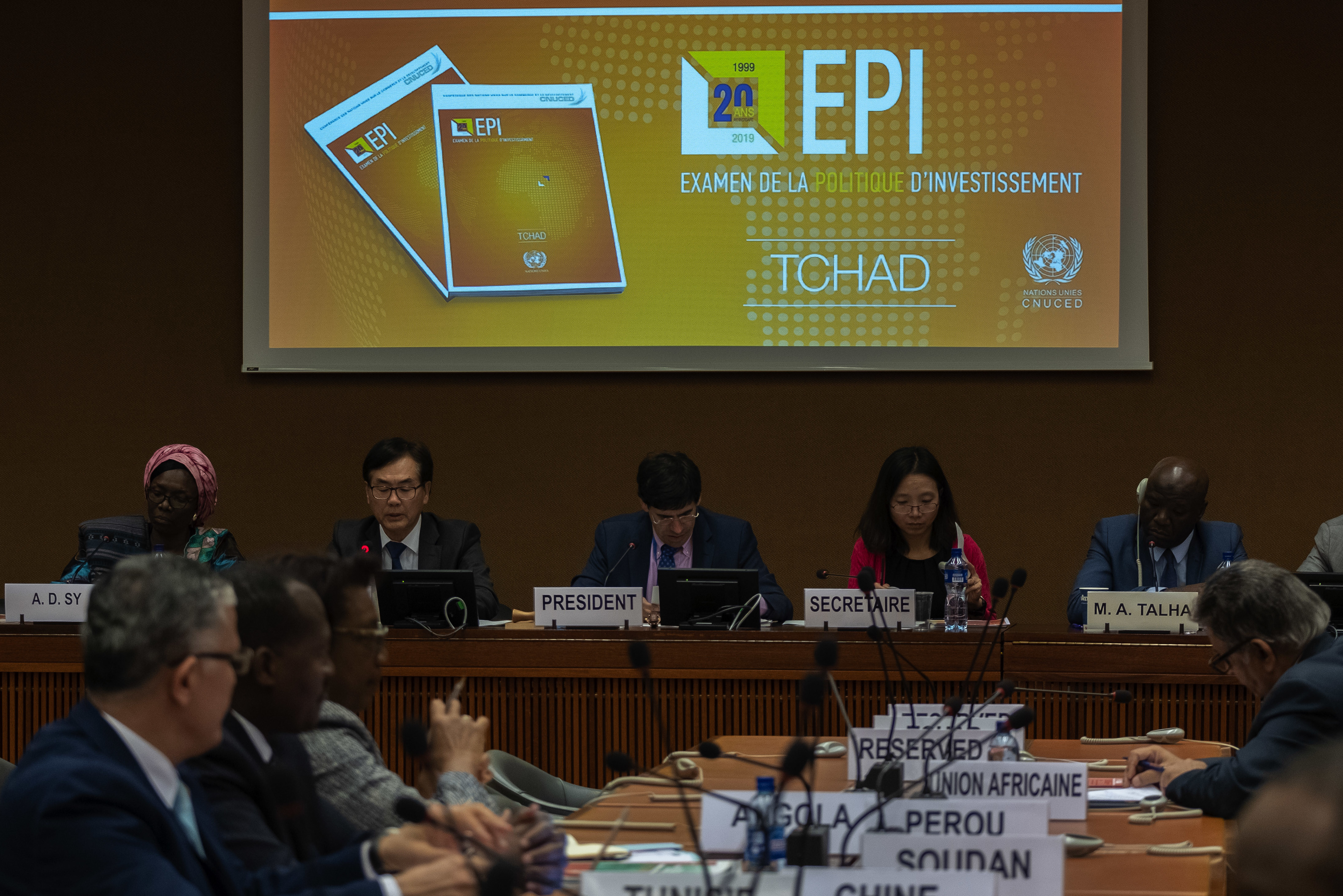
UNCTAD's Investment Policy Review for Chad in 2019 (Sy on left)

She is admired by the first lady of Chad for her hardwork. On the 11 August 2019, she was appointed by Chad President Idriss Deby Itno to be the Minister of Commerce of Industry and Private Sector Promotion. Sy was sworn into her new role on 19 August 2019. The commerce of Chad and the foreign investment it attracts is currently (2019) dominated by the country's oil production.

Sy has been talking with United Nations Conference on Trade and Development (UNCTAD) as part of an "investment policy review" in line with the United Nations Strategic Development Goals. Sy was keen to see economic diversification in Chad to avoid food poverty and reduce the dependence on oil. Investment in Chad's gum arabic production together with, livestock, sesame seeds, Shea butter, the algae spirulina and groundnuts were investment opportunities.
