= Andrée Touré =

First Lady of Guinea from 1958 to 1984 (1934–2026)

Hadja Andrée Touré
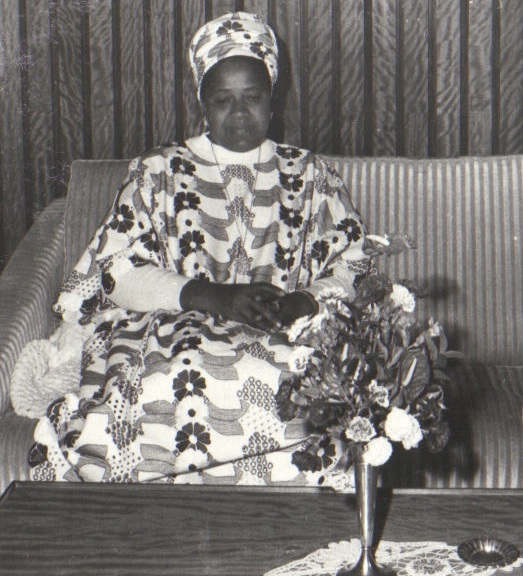
- Touré in 1979

First Lady of Guinea
- In role 14 October 1958 – 24 March 1984
- President: Ahmed Sékou Touré
- Preceded by: Position established

Personal details
- Born: Marie-Andrée du Plantier; 18 November 1934 Kankan, French Guinea, French West Africa
- Died: 8 July 2026 (aged 91) Morocco
- Spouse: Ahmed Sékou Touré (m. 1953; died 1984)

Andrée Touré (born Marie-Andrée du Plantier; 18 November 1934 – 8 July 2026) was the first First Lady of Guinea from 1958 to 1984 as the wife of Ahmed Sékou Touré, the country's first president after independence.

Following her husband's death in 1984, she and her son were arrested and in 1987, and she was sentenced to eight years of forced labour. She was able to leave the country, but returned in 2000.

== Biography ==
Marie-Andrée du Plantier was born in 1934 in Kankan; she was the daughter of French physician Paul-Mary du Plantier and Kaïssa Kourouma, a Maninka. After her father left the country at the outbreak of the Second World War, she was raised by the family of her uncle, Mory Sinkoun Kaba. Shortly after completing her schooling with a primary school certificate, she met Ahmed Sékou Touré. Their marriage took place on 18 June 1953 at the mosque of Kankan, although in accordance with Muslim rites, they did not attend the ceremony. On 12 March 1961, their son Mohamed was born.

When Guinea gained independence in October 1958 and Sékou Touré became president, Andrée supported her husband as First Lady. She was by his side at key meetings with world leaders, including John F. Kennedy, in Washington, Habib Bourguiba in Tunis, Mao Zedong in Beijing, and Nikita Khrushchev in Moscow.

After her husband died in office following an unsuccessful heart operation on 26 March 1984, Andrée Touré and her son were arrested and her property confiscated. In 1987, she was sentenced to eight years of forced labour but was released in January 1988 and allowed to leave the country. After living in Morocco, the Ivory Coast, and Senegal, she returned to Guinea in 2000. Thereafter she constantly spoke of her husband's success in establishing and developing an independent state. Her son Mohamed Touré was appointed secretary-general of the Democratic Party of Guinea, which was founded by his father.

In 2021, she was visited by Guinean military president Mamady Doumbouya, who later issued a decree restoring her family's ownership of the Sylli de Belle Vue villa. In 2024, she granted permission for Sékou Touré's private archives to be transferred to the National Archives of Guinea.

Touré died in Morocco on 8 July 2026, at the age of 91. She had been receiving routine medical treatment.
