= Chabeuil =

Chabeuil Chabuelh (Occitan)
- Commune
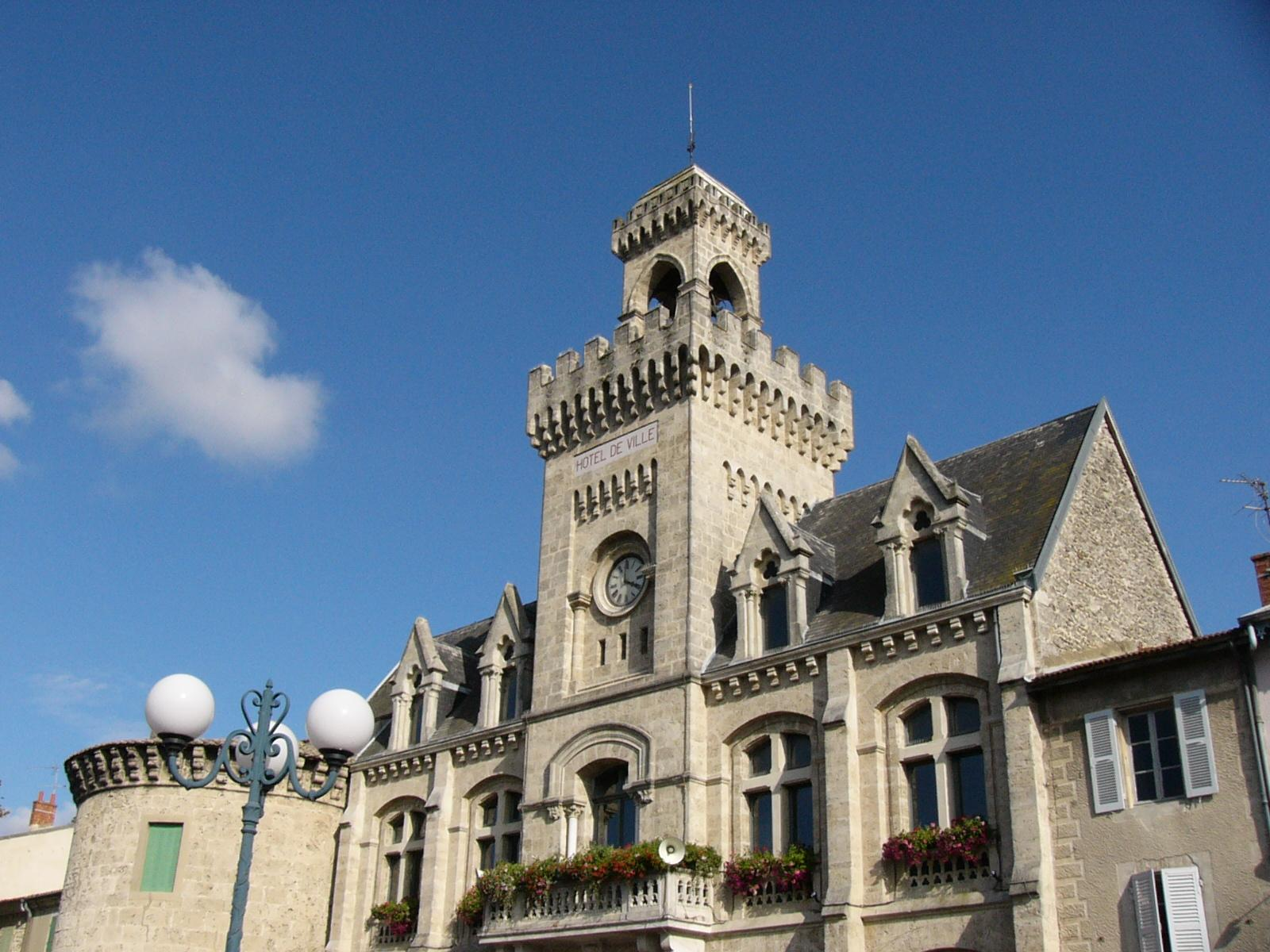
- Town hall

- Coat of arms
- Location of Chabeuil
- Location within France Location within Auvergne-Rhône-Alpes
- Coordinates: 44°54′02″N 5°01′15″E
- Country: France
- Region: Auvergne-Rhône-Alpes
- Department: Drôme
- Arrondissement: Valence
- Canton: Valence-2
- Intercommunality: CA Valence Romans Agglo

Government
  - Mayor (2022–2026): Alban Pano (LR)
- Area^{1}: 41.07 km^{2} (15.86 sq mi)
- Elevation: 212 m (696 ft)
- Highest elevation: 381 m (1,250 ft)
- Lowest elevation: 153 m (502 ft)
- Population (2023): 6,833
  - Density: 166.4/km^{2} (430.9/sq mi)
- Demonym: Chabeuillois
- Time zone: UTC+01:00 (CET)
  - Summer (DST): UTC+02:00 (CEST)
- INSEE/Postal code: 26064 /26120
- Website: www.mairie-chabeuil.com
- ^{1} French Land Register data, which excludes lakes, ponds, glaciers > 1 km^{2} (0.386 sq mi or 247 acres) and river estuaries.

Chabeuil (French pronunciation: [ʃabœj]; Occitan: Chabuelh) is a commune in the Drôme department in southeastern France.

Chabeuil's notable town hall was designed by the architect Ernst Tracol, and was completed in 1883 with tuff stone quarried in the neighbouring village of Peyrus.

== Population ==
Historical population

Year	Pop.	±% p.a.
1793	2,856	—
1800	4,050	+5.12%
1806	3,765	−1.21%
1821	4,058	+0.50%
1831	4,452	+0.93%
1836	4,295	−0.72%
1841	4,461	+0.76%
1846	4,580	+0.53%
1851	4,526	−0.24%
1856	4,399	−0.57%
1861	4,355	−0.20%
1866	4,333	−0.10%
1872	3,436	−3.79%
1876	3,328	−0.80%
1881	3,121	−1.28%
1886	3,375	+1.58%
1891	3,076	−1.84%
1896	3,177	+0.65%
1901	3,100	−0.49%

Year	Pop.	±% p.a.
1906	3,089	−0.07%
1911	3,090	+0.01%
1921	2,652	−1.52%
1926	2,746	+0.70%
1931	2,633	−0.84%
1936	2,676	+0.32%
1946	2,672	−0.01%
1954	2,950	+1.24%
1962	3,266	+1.28%
1968	3,500	+1.16%
1975	3,809	+1.22%
1982	4,319	+1.81%
1990	4,790	+1.30%
1999	5,861	+2.27%
2007	6,462	+1.23%
2012	6,784	+0.98%
2017	6,875	+0.27%
2023	6,833	−0.10%

Source: EHESS and INSEE (1968-2023)

== Notable people ==
- Lauriane Doumbouya, French-born First Lady of Guinea (2021–present)

== See also ==
- Communes of the Drôme department
