= Mory Sinkoun Kaba =

Guinean businessman and philanthropist

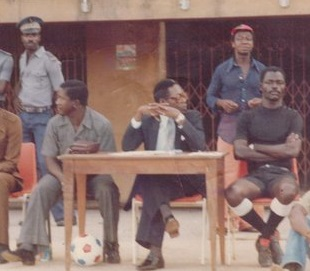
- As President of Hafia FC, 1983
- Born: 1933
- Died: 2015 (aged 81–82); Chad
- Other names: Kaba Mory, "MS"
- Spouse: Kaba Rokhaya Diakité
- Children: Fatoumata Kaba; Mamady Sinkoun Kaba; Ibrahim Sinkoun Kaba

Mory Sinkoun Kaba (1933 – 2015), known as Kaba Mory or MS, was a Guinean businessman and philanthropist. Close to president Sékou Touré, he realised numerous state projects on his behalf.

Kaba was the eldest son of Abdourahmane Sinkoun Kaba (1904 – 1972), a prominent figure in the Guinean revolution, who was known as le vieux Sinkoun Kaba ("Sinkoun Kaba the Elder"). Under colonial rule, he became the first Guinean administrator, and district commander. After Guinean independence, he became the first Secretary-General of the Republic of Guinea, and then Home Secretary.

== Exile ==
After the 1984 military coup d'état, Kaba was awarded political refugee status in France, and moved with his family to the 16th arrondissement of Paris. While in France, he had cordial relations with Presidents François Mitterrand and Jacques Chirac.

Starting in the 1990s, while in exile, he had an important role under the opposition politician Alpha Condé. When his death in Chad was announced, Condé, by then president of Guinea, went with several members of the government to his home in Conakry, to offer their condolences to his wife, Kaba Rokhaya Diakité.

== Sport ==
Kaba remained as honorary president of Hafia FC, which he turned into a famous club in Guinea and throughout Africa. As a successful businessman, he put his fortune – and his private jet – at the club's service. He became vice-president of the Guinean Football Federation and a member of the Olympic Committee of Guinea.

== Bibliography ==
Kaba is extensively quoted by Ambassador André Lewin in his biography of Sékou Touré.

== Family life ==
Mory had 10 children: Fatoumata Kaba, UNHCR spokesperson Mamady Sinkoun Kaba Presidential Director of state Protocol and Ibrahim Sinkoun Kaba.
