= Hinda Déby Itno =

First Lady of Chad (born 1980)

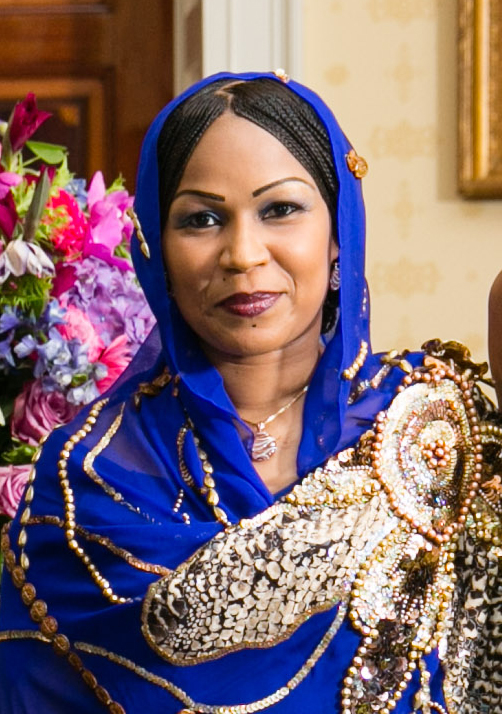
- Itno in the White House, Washington DC, United States

Former First Lady of Chad
- In office 2 October 2005 – 20 April 2021
- President: Idriss Déby
- Preceded by: Hadja Halimé
- Succeeded by: Dahabaya Oumar Souni

First Lady of the African Union
- In office 30 January 2016 – 30 January 2017
- President: Idriss Déby
- Preceded by: Grace Mugabe
- Succeeded by: Djene Kaba Condé

Personal details
- Born: 5 April 1980 (age 46) N'Djamena, Chad
- Spouse: Idriss Déby (m. 2005; died 2021)
- Children: 5

Hinda Déby Itno (Arabic: هندة ديبي اتنو; born 5 April 1980) is a Chadian former First Lady who served from 2005 to 2021. She was the wife of former President Idriss Déby.

== Biography ==
Itno was born in the Chadian capital N'Djamena in 1980 to Mahamat and Mariam Abderahim Acyl. Her father was a diplomat who had worked at Chad's embassy in Washington D.C. He was Secretary of State for Public Health, Labor and Social Affairs from July 1976 to September 1978. Her father retired after serving several years as a consultant N'Djamena, but he was appointed Ambassador of Chad to Sudan in 2010.

== Positions ==
On 2 October 2005 she became the wife of Chad's President and she was identified as the First Lady as he already had other wives.

In 2014 Chad's National Council of Women (CONAF-TCHAD) was formed with her strong support. Achta Djibrine Sy became the vice-president of that organisation which campaigned against discrimination.

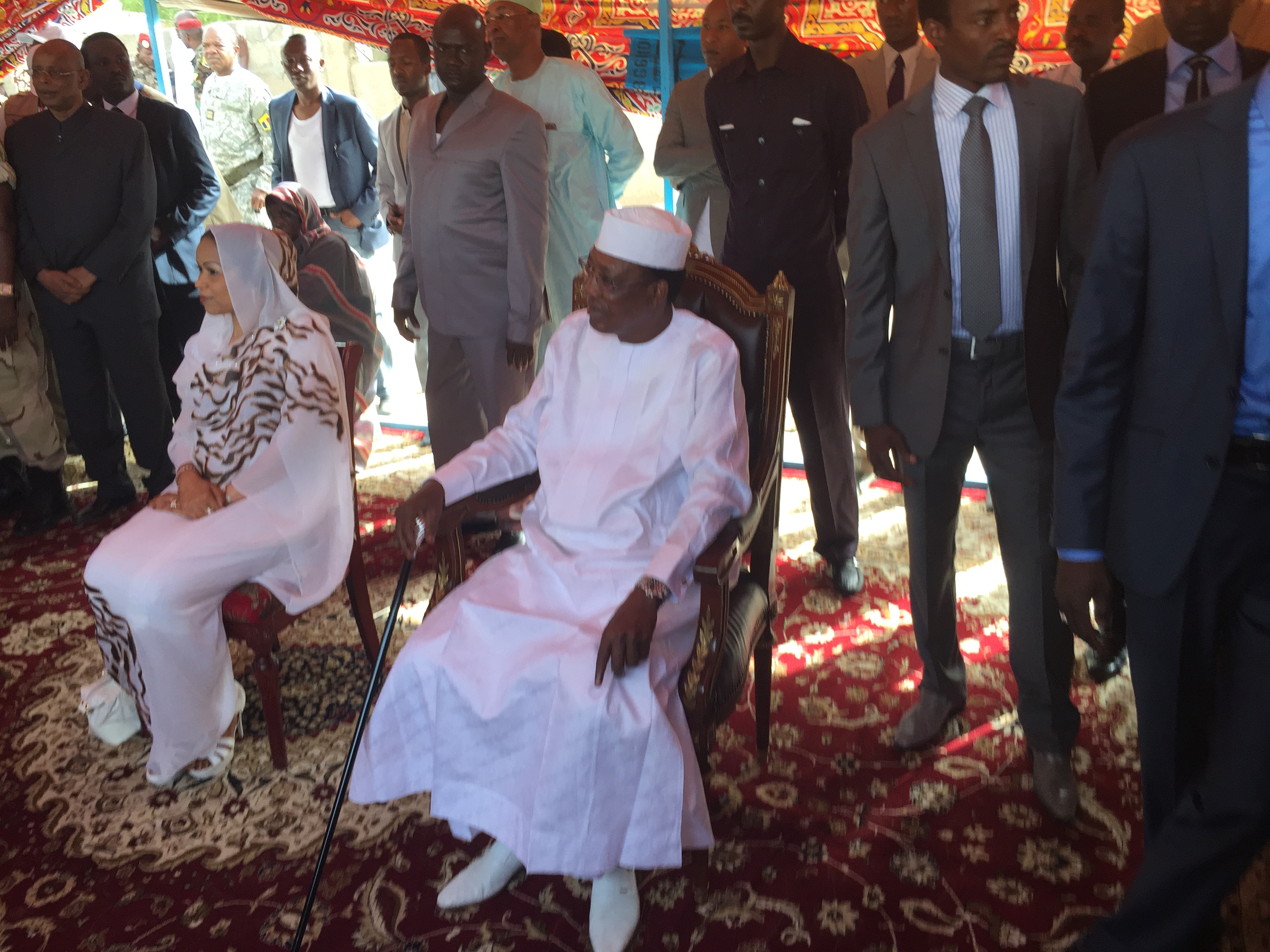
Ino and the President waiting to vote in 2016

Itno admired Sy for her hard work. On 11 August 2019, Sy was appointed by Chad President Idriss Deby Itno to be the Minister of Commerce of Industry and Private Sector Promotion.

In 2017, by French decree, she was given French nationality together with her five children, who had all been born in France. Chad allows its nationals to have joint nationality.

Itno has been appointed a Special Ambassador for the Prevention of HIV by the American charity UNAIDS which aims to eradicate the disease by 2030.
