= Ammonium caprylate =

Names
- IUPAC name azanium;octanoate
- Other names Ammonium octanoate

Identifiers
CAS Number	5972-76-9
3D model (JSmol)	Interactive image
ChemSpider	2282857
ECHA InfoCard	100.025.241
EC Number	227-765-5
PubChem CID	13796969
UNII	1INS5UE40F
CompTox Dashboard (EPA)	DTXSID9052264
- InChI: InChI=1S/C8H16O2.H3N/c1-2-3-4-5-6-7-8(9)10;/h2-7H2,1H3,(H,9,10);1H3 Key: GEWYFWXMYWWLHW-UHFFFAOYSA-N
- SMILES: C(CCCCC)CC(O)=O.N

Properties
Chemical formula	C_{8}H_{19}NO_{2}
Molar mass	161.245 g·mol^{−1}
Melting point	16.5 °C
Solubility in water	soluble

Hazards
Flash point	107.4 °C
- Except where otherwise noted, data are given for materials in their standard state (at 25 °C [77 °F], 100 kPa). Infobox references

Ammonium caprylate is a chemical compound with the chemical formula C_{8}H_{19}NO_{2}. This is an organic ammonium salt of caprylic acid.

== Synthesis ==
Ammonium caprylate can be prepared by reacting caprylic acid and ammonia.

== Physical properties ==
Ammonium caprylate forms hygroscopic crystals of the monoclinic system.

It can be easily hydrolyzed by water. It is soluble in glacial acetic acid and ethanol; less soluble in methanol; slightly soluble in acetone and ethyl acetate; and practically insoluble in chloroform or benzene.

Ammonium caprylate loses ammonia slowly in dry air, but this process is accelerated in humid air.

== Uses ==
The compound is used to produce photographic emulsions, also as an insecticide and nematocide, and in manufacturing of zinc caprylate. In the food industry it is used as an emulsifier, stabilizer, and anticaking agent.
