= Malissard =

- Commune
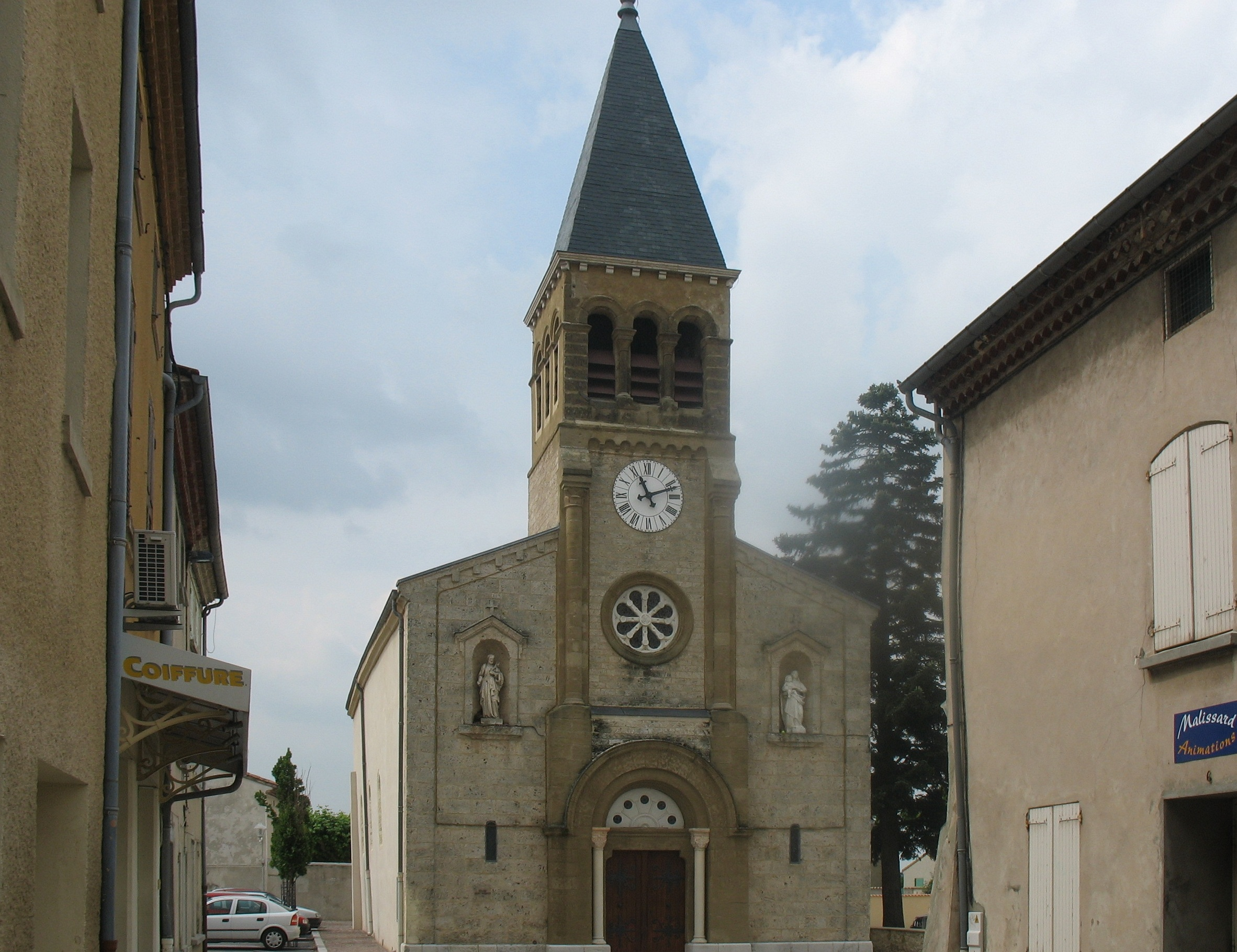
- The church in Malissard
- Location of Malissard
- Location within France Location within Auvergne-Rhône-Alpes
- Coordinates: 44°54′08″N 4°57′26″E
- Country: France
- Region: Auvergne-Rhône-Alpes
- Department: Drôme
- Arrondissement: Valence
- Canton: Valence-2
- Intercommunality: CA Valence Romans Agglo

Government
  - Mayor (2020–2026): Jean-Marc Valla
- Area^{1}: 10.17 km^{2} (3.93 sq mi)
- Elevation: 152 m (499 ft)
- Highest elevation: 176 m (577 ft)
- Lowest elevation: 145 m (476 ft)
- Population (2023): 3,294
  - Density: 323.9/km^{2} (838.9/sq mi)
- Time zone: UTC+01:00 (CET)
  - Summer (DST): UTC+02:00 (CEST)
- INSEE/Postal code: 26170 /26120
- ^{1} French Land Register data, which excludes lakes, ponds, glaciers > 1 km^{2} (0.386 sq mi or 247 acres) and river estuaries.

Malissard (French pronunciation: [malisaʁ]; Occitan: Maleissart) is a commune in the Drôme department in southeastern France.

== Population ==
Historical population
Year	Pop.	±% p.a.
1968	1,090	—
1975	1,534	+5.00%
1982	2,011	+3.94%
1990	2,552	+3.02%
1999	2,903	+1.44%
2007	3,157	+1.05%
2012	3,251	+0.59%
2017	3,201	−0.31%
2023	3,294	+0.48%
Source: INSEE

== See also ==
- Communes of the Drôme department
