= Djene Kaba Condé =

Guinean socialite (1960–2023)

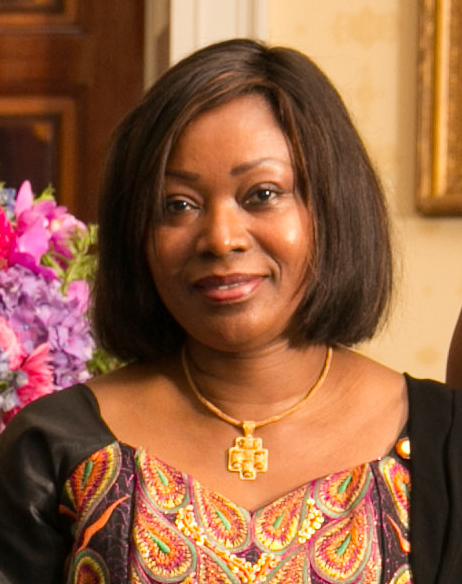
- Condé in 2014

First Lady of Guinea
- In role 21 December 2010 – 5 September 2021
- President: Alpha Condé
- Preceded by: Jeanne Saba
- Succeeded by: Lauriane Doumbouya

First Lady of African Union
- In role 30 January 2017 – 28 January 2018
- President: Alpha Condé
- Preceded by: Hinda Déby Itno
- Succeeded by: Jeannette Kagame

Personal details
- Born: 1960 Kankan, Guinea
- Died: 8 April 2023 (aged 62–63) Neuilly-sur-Seine, France
- Spouse: Alpha Condé
- Education: University Paris VII

Djene Kaba Condé (1960 – 8 April 2023) was the first lady of Guinea from 2010 until her husband Alpha Condé's overthrow during the 2021 Guinean coup d'état. She had three children.

== Education ==
Djene Kaba Condé was born in Kankan in 1960. She studied at University Paris VII in France. She held a Masters of Information Science and a communications degree from the aforementioned institution. She also earned a degree in sociology. She worked for the agency of the Francophonie in Paris, and for ten years was advisor to employment and professional insertion ANPE-PARIS.

Condé supported her dissertation thesis on the theme: Racism in the French press, a comparative study of three major dailies Le Monde, Le Figaro, and Libération.

== Professional background ==
Immediately after graduating from university and her post-graduate studies, Kaba began working at the Agency for Cultural and Technical Cooperation. For 8 years she held different positions, including acting as assistant to the director of communications, IT management, and human resources. She then took on the job of Employment Counselor at the National Employment Agency.

== Political engagement ==
Djéné Condé supported the Foundation for Maternal and Child Social Promotion (PROSMI), created in February 2011. The foundation undertakes action in several areas, including health, environment, women's empowerment and schooling girls.

== Death ==
Condé died following an undisclosed illness in France.
