= Henriette Conté =

Guinean politician (died 2020)

First Lady of Guinea
- In office 5 April 1984 – 22 December 2008

Personal details
- Died: 12 May 2020 Conakry, Guinea

Henriette Conté (died 12 May 2020) was the wife of former President of Guinea Lansana Conté.

She was First Lady of Guinea from 5 April 1984 until his death on 22 December 2008.

Conté died from COVID-19 in 2020.
