= Montélier =

- Commune
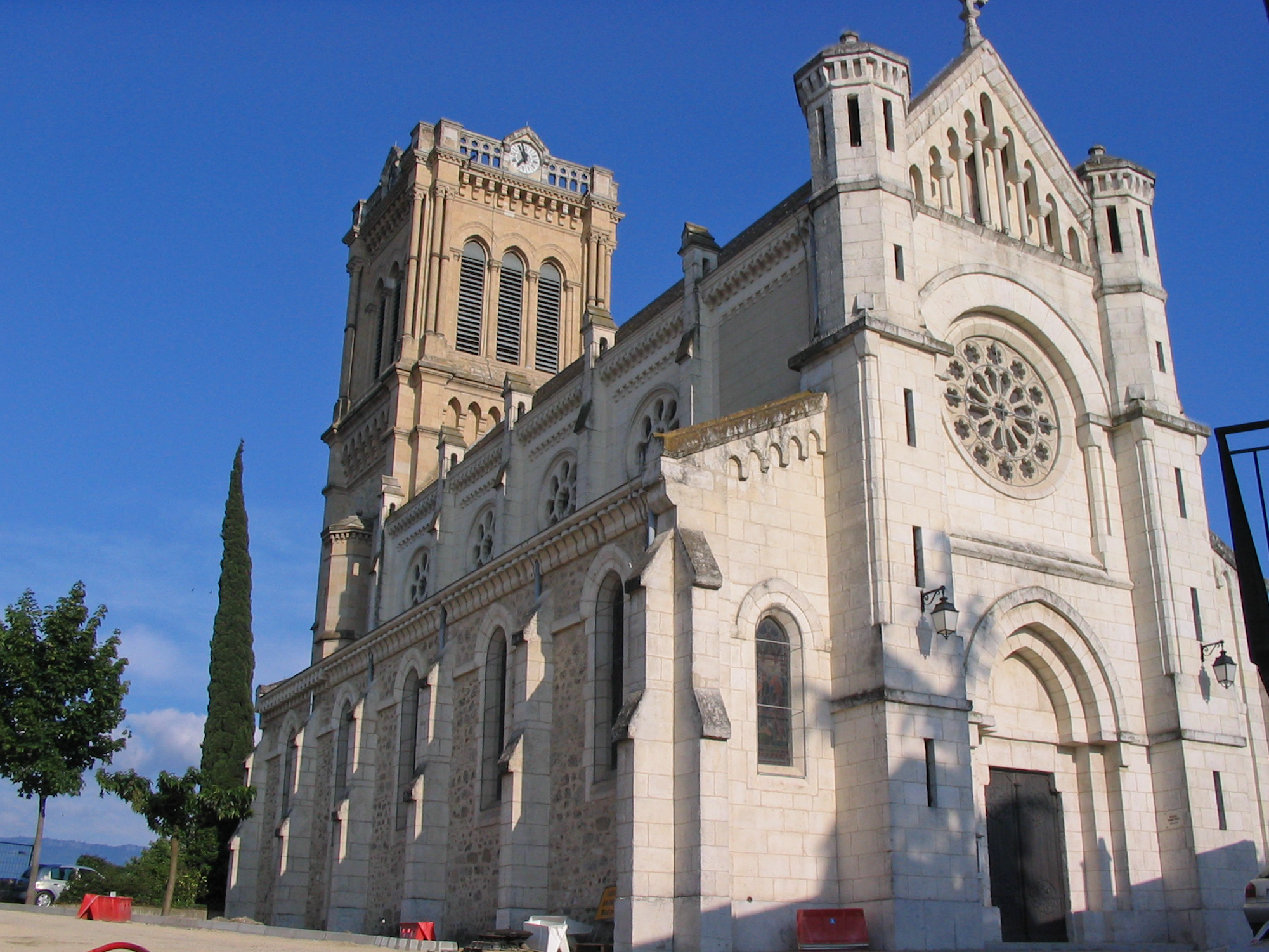
- The church of Saint-Prix, in Montélier
- Location of Montélier
- Location within France Location within Auvergne-Rhône-Alpes
- Coordinates: 44°56′18″N 5°01′54″E
- Country: France
- Region: Auvergne-Rhône-Alpes
- Department: Drôme
- Arrondissement: Valence
- Canton: Valence-2
- Intercommunality: CA Valence Romans Agglo

Government
  - Mayor (2020–2026): Bernard Vallon
- Area^{1}: 24.76 km^{2} (9.56 sq mi)
- Elevation: 200 m (660 ft)
- Highest elevation: 293 m (961 ft)
- Lowest elevation: 164 m (538 ft)
- Population (2023): 4,323
  - Density: 174.6/km^{2} (452.2/sq mi)
- Time zone: UTC+01:00 (CET)
  - Summer (DST): UTC+02:00 (CEST)
- INSEE/Postal code: 26197 /26120
- ^{1} French Land Register data, which excludes lakes, ponds, glaciers > 1 km^{2} (0.386 sq mi or 247 acres) and river estuaries.

Montélier (French pronunciation: [mɔ̃telje]; Occitan: Montelhes) is a commune in the Drôme department in southeastern France.

== Population ==
Historical population
Year	Pop.	±% p.a.
1968	1,058	—
1975	1,276	+2.71%
1982	2,126	+7.57%
1990	2,738	+3.21%
1999	3,120	+1.46%
2007	3,351	+0.90%
2012	3,814	+2.62%
2017	4,140	+1.65%
2023	4,323	+0.72%
Source: INSEE

== See also ==
- Communes of the Drôme department
