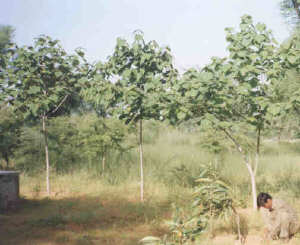
- Gmelina arborea tree plantation
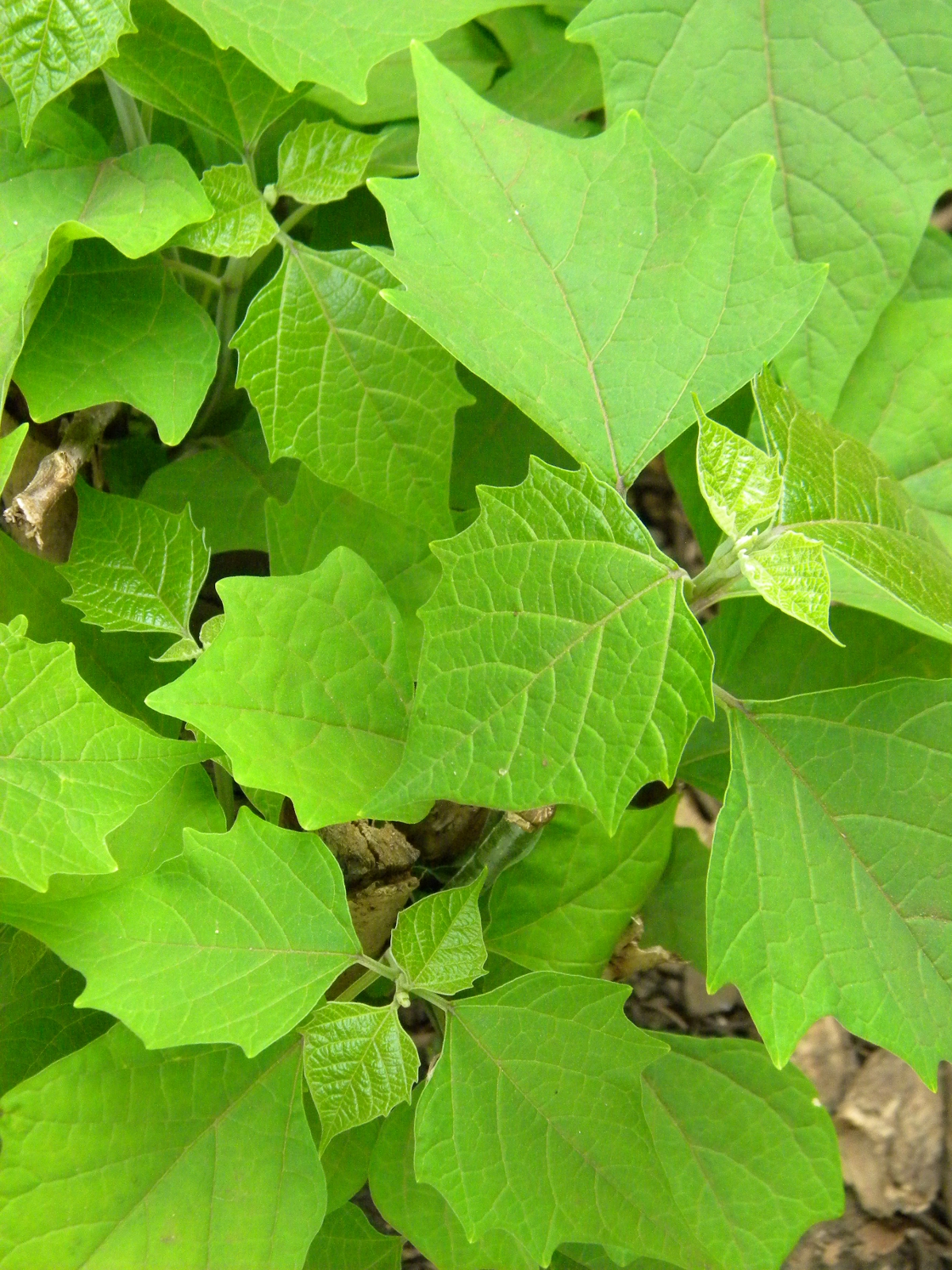
- Gmelina arborea sapling from Mindanao, Philippines

Conservation status
- Least Concern (IUCN 3.1)

Scientific classification
- Kingdom: Plantae
- Clade: Tracheophytes
- Clade: Angiosperms
- Clade: Eudicots
- Clade: Asterids
- Order: Lamiales
- Family: Lamiaceae
- Genus: Gmelina
- Species: G. arborea

Binomial name
- Gmelina arborea Roxb. ex Sm.

Synonyms
- Gmelina arborea var. canescens Haines; Gmelina arborea f. dentata Moldenke; Gmelina arborea var. glaucescens C.B.Clarke; Gmelina rheedei Hook. [Illegitimate]; Gmelina sinuata Link; Premna arborea Roth

= Gmelina arborea =

Species of flowering plant

Gmelina arborea (in English beechwood, gmelina, goomar teak, Kashmir tree, Malay beechwood, white teak, yamane ), locally known as gamhar, is a fast-growing deciduous tree in the family Lamiaceae.

== Distribution and habitat ==
Gmelina arborea grows naturally throughout India, Myanmar, Thailand, Laos, Cambodia, Vietnam and in southern provinces of China. It is found at altitudes from sea level to 1,500 metres (5,000 ft). Since the 1960s, it has been introduced extensively as fast-growing timber trees in Brazil, Gambia, Honduras, Ivory Coast, Malaysia, Malawi, Nigeria, the Philippines, and Sierra Leone. It is also planted in gardens and avenues.

== Utilization ==
The species is fast-growing and thus raised in large-scale plantations to produce wood for construction, crafts, paper pulp, fuel, and charcoal. It produces high-quality wood used in the manufacture of furniture and to make plywood, matches and agricultural implements. The nectar of the flowers yields high-quality honey.

The Lion Throne, the most important, and last surviving, of the eight royal thrones of Myanmar, now in the National Museum in Yangon, is carved from Gmelina arborea wood.

== Chemistry ==
Lignans, such as 6" - bromo - isoarboreol, 4-hydroxysesamin, 4,8-dihydroxysesamin, 1,4-dihydroxysesamin (gummadiol), 2-piperonyl-3-hydroxymethyl-4-(α-hydroxy-3,4-methylenedioxybenzyl)-4-hydroxytetrahydrofuran and the 4-O-glucoside of 4-epigummadiol, can be isolated from the heartwood of Gmelina arborea. The parent compounds are arboreol or gmelanone.

Umbelliferone 7-apiosylglucoside can be isolated from the root.

Five constituents, isolated from the heartwood of G. arborea, (+)-7′-O-ethyl arboreol, (+)-paulownin, (+)-gmelinol, (+)-epieudesmin and (−)-β-sitosterol, show antifungal activity against Trametes versicolor.

== Gallery ==
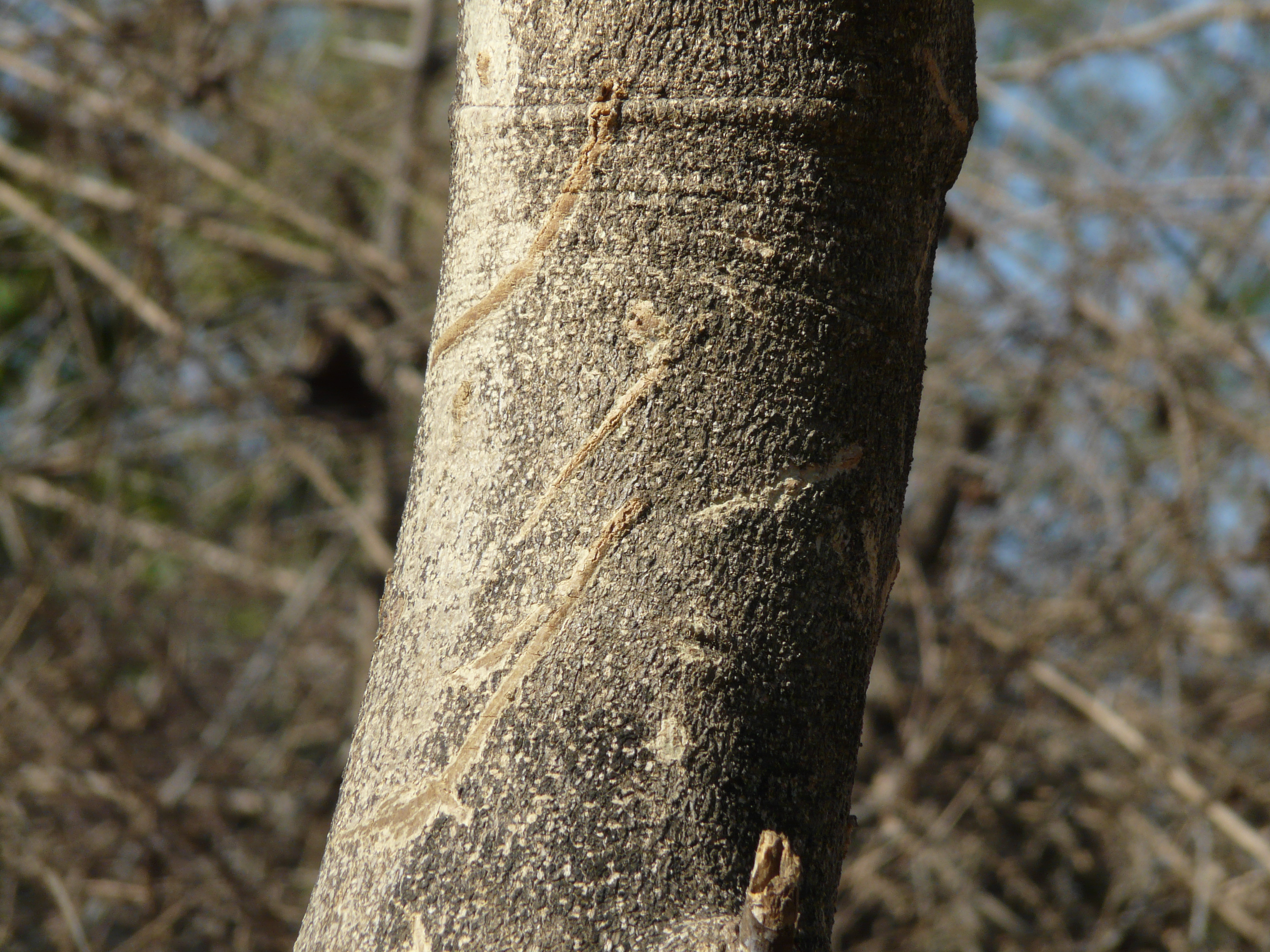
Bark

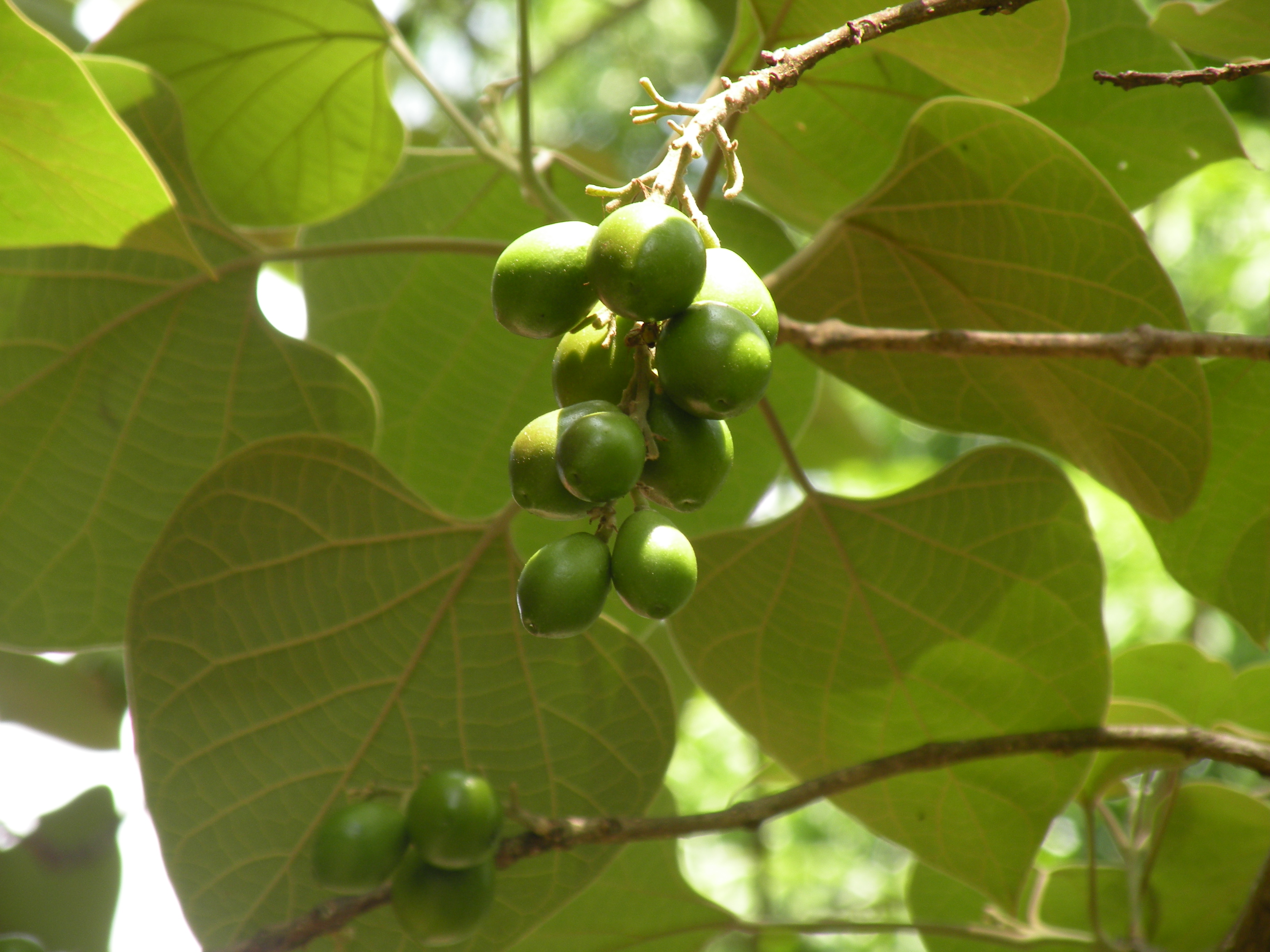
Fruits

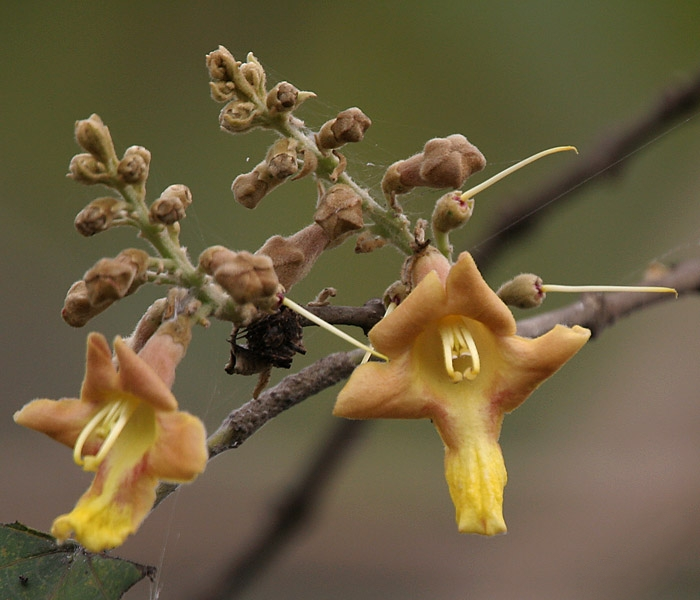
Flower

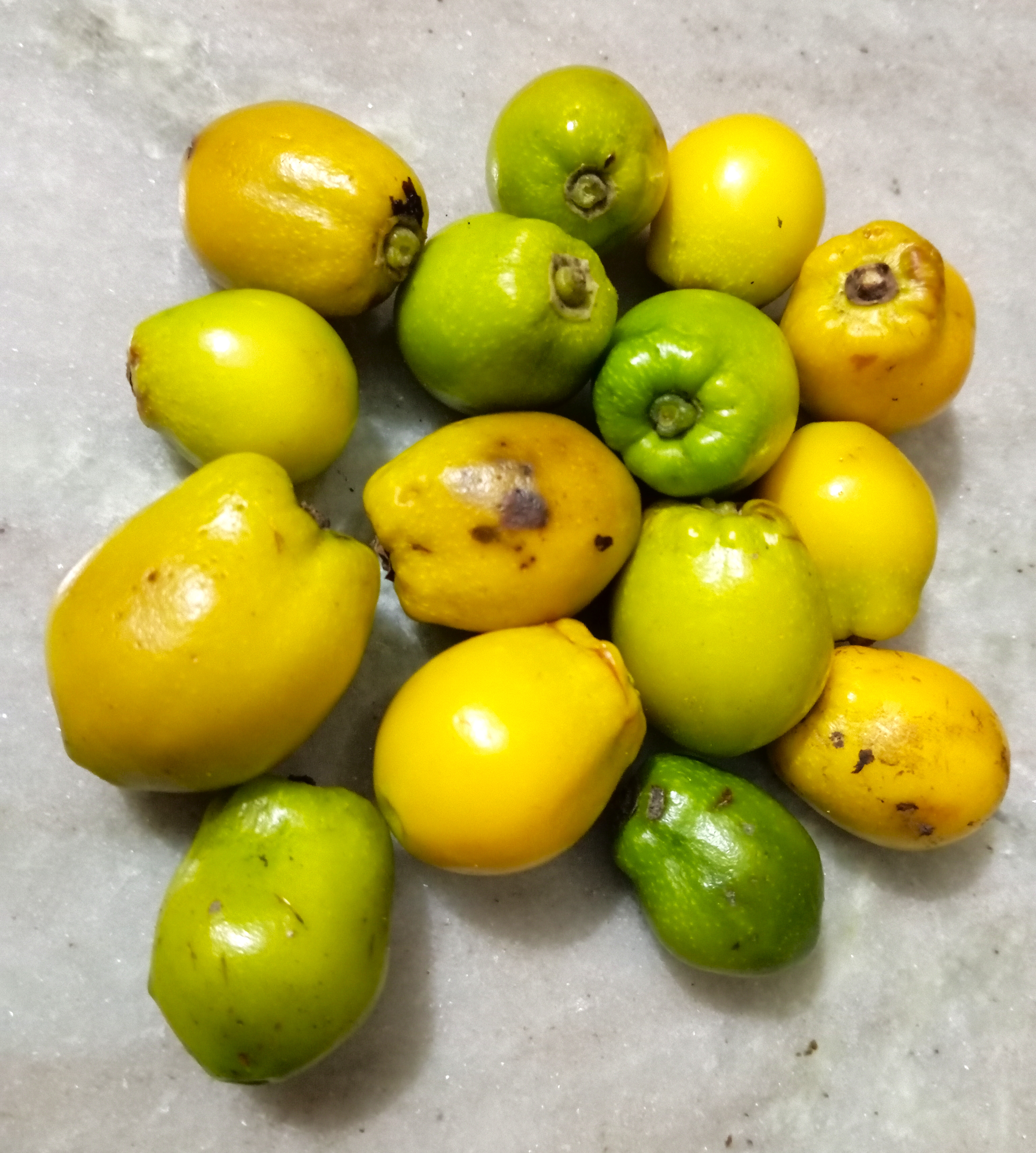
Ripe fruits

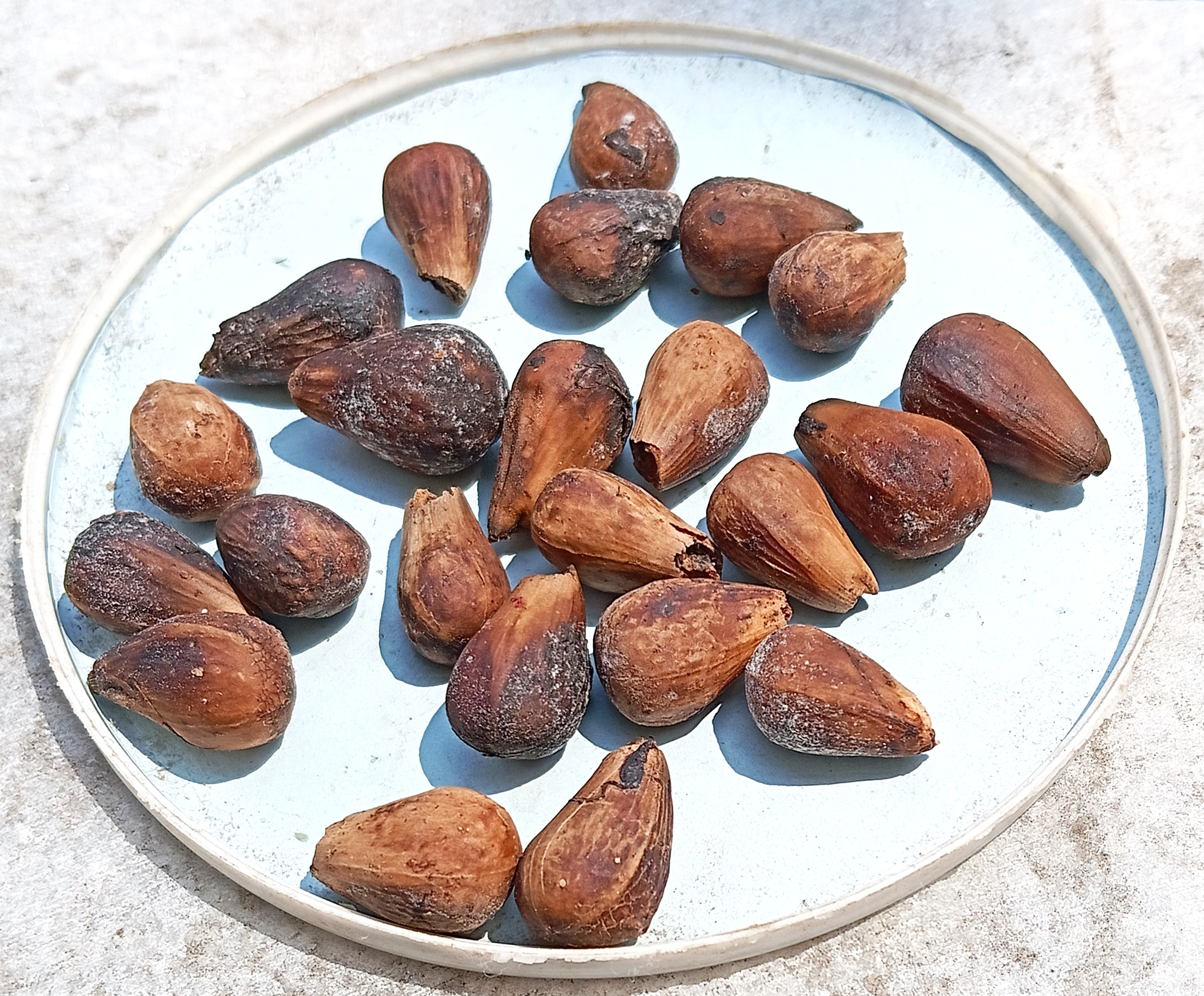
Seeds
