= First Lady of Guinea =

Spouse of the President of Guinea

- Incumbent; Lauriane Doumbouya since September 5, 2021
- Residence: Presidential Palace, Conakry
- Inaugural holder: Andrée Touré
- Formation: October 2, 1958
- Website: Présidence de la République: La Premiere Dame

First Lady of Guinea (French: Première Dame de la République de Guinée) is the title attributed to the wife of the president of Guinea. The country's present first lady is Lauriane Doumbouya, wife of interim President Mamady Doumbouya, who has held the position since the 2021 Guinean coup d'etat on September 5, 2021. There has been no first gentleman of Guinea to date.

== First Ladies of Guinea ==
Names	Portrait	Term Began	Term Ended	President of Guinea	Image of President	Notes
Andrée Touré		October 2, 1958	March 26, 1984	Ahmed Sékou Touré		Born Marie-Andrée Duplantier, Andrée Touré married Ahmed Sékou Touré in 1953. She became Guinea's inaugural first lady upon the country's independence in 1958.
Delphine Béavogui		March 26, 1984	April 3, 1984	Louis Lansana Beavogui		Louis Lansana Beavogui served as interim president following President Ahmed Sékou Touré's death. Delphine Béavogui died on August 28, 2018, at the age of 87.
Henriette Conté		April 5, 1984	December 22, 2008	Lansana Conté		President Lansana Conté, who came to power in the 1984 Guinean coup d'état, was polygamous and had four wives.: Henriette Conté held the position of First Lady of Guinea during Lansana Conté's presidency. She died on May 12, 2020, in Kaporo, Conakry, from a heart attack that was possibly related to a COVID-19 infection.; Kadiatou Seth Conté, President Conté's second wife, is a former Miss Guinea beauty pageant winner. By 2003, Kadiatou Seth Conté was living abroad, away from President Conté, in Morocco with their eight children, though the relationship had reportedly begun to improve at the time.; Lansana Conté's third wife, Asmaou Bah Conté, a member of the Peule people, had one son with Conté. During the president's declining health in 2003, Bah Conté reportedly lived in a home on Conakry's Corniche under the guard of the country's Red Brigades.; Mamadie Touré is Lansana Conté's fourth and youngest wife, having married the president during the 2000s. Her name is mentioned in numerous documents during an investigation into the $2.5 billion mining rights to the Simandou iron ore mine, which was obtained by Beny Steinmetz and his BSGR company. Mamadie Touré agreed to cooperate with American prosecutors and the FBI as a witness during its corruption probe. She lived in Jacksonville, Florida, as of 2013.
Position vacant		December 24, 2008	December 3, 2009	Moussa Dadis Camara		Captain Moussa Dadis Camara came to power in the 2008 Guinean coup d'état after Lansana Conté's death. Camara went into exile in Burkina Faso in January 2010 following an assassination attempt and settled in Ouagadougou with his girlfriend, Jeanne Saba, a Burkinabe national. Moussa Dadis Camara married Jeanne Saba on August 22, 2010, and converted to Saba's religion, Roman Catholicism, on the same day as their wedding. Saba and Camara had two children by 2012.
?		December 3, 2009	December 21, 2010	Sékouba Konaté (acting)		Konaté wed Mariama Sako Hall Konaté, though it is unclear if they were married during his tenure in office.
Djene Kaba Condé		December 21, 2010	September 5, 2021	Alpha Condé		Overthrow in 2021 Guinean coup d'état. She died in France on 8 April 2023.
Lauriane Doumbouya		September 5, 2021	Present	Mamady Doumbouya		Incumbent first lady since the 2021 Guinean coup d'état led by her husband.
