= Decarboxylated 8,5'-diferulic acid =

Names
- Preferred IUPAC name (2E)-3-{{#parsoidfragment:0}}{4-Hydroxy-3-[(E)-2-(4-hydroxy-3-methoxyphenyl)ethen-1-yl]-5-methoxyphenyl}prop-2-enoic acid
- Other names 8,5'-DiFA (DC); 8,5'-diFA (decarboxylated form); Poacic acid

Identifiers
CAS Number	160097-32-5
3D model (JSmol)	Interactive image
ChEBI	CHEBI:156511
ChEMBL	ChEMBL4218130
ChemSpider	8512879
PubChem CID	10337420
CompTox Dashboard (EPA)	DTXSID901045391
- InChI: InChI=1S/C19H18O6/c1-24-16-10-12(4-7-15(16)20)3-6-14-9-13(5-8-18(21)22)11-17(25-2)19(14)23/h3-11,20,23H,1-2H3,(H,21,22)/b6-3+,8-5+ Key: SLIMCXCSQXYCGL-JENUQAQBSA-N; InChI=1/C19H18O6/c1-24-16-10-12(4-7-15(16)20)3-6-14-9-13(5-8-18(21)22)11-17(25-2)19(14)23/h3-11,20,23H,1-2H3,(H,21,22)/b6-3+,8-5+ Key: SLIMCXCSQXYCGL-JENUQAQBBX
- SMILES: Oc2c(OC)cc(\C=C\C(O)=O)cc2\C=C\c(cc1OC)ccc1O

Properties
Chemical formula	C_{19}H_{18}O_{6}
Molar mass	342.347 g·mol^{−1}
- Except where otherwise noted, data are given for materials in their standard state (at 25 °C [77 °F], 100 kPa). Infobox references

Decarboxylated 8,5'-diferulic acid is a molecule included in the group but is not a true diferulic acid. It is found in maize bran.

== See also ==
- 8,5'-Diferulic acid
