= Stabiliser (food) =

Food additive

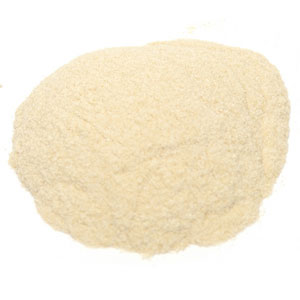
Pectin is used as a stabiliser in foods such as yogurt

A stabiliser or stabilizer is an additive to food which helps to preserve its structure. Typical uses include preventing oil-water emulsions from separating in products such as salad dressing; preventing ice crystals from forming in frozen food such as ice cream; and preventing fruit from settling in products such as jam, yogurt and jellies. Some of these food additives may promote the growth of specific microorganisms in the gastrointestinal tract that can ferment them. The following hydrocolloids are the most common ones used as stabilisers:

- alginate
- agar
- carrageenan
- cellulose and cellulose derivatives
- gelatine
- guar gum
- gum Arabic
- locust bean gum
- pectin
- starch
- xanthan gum

== See also ==
- Gums and Stabilisers for the Food Industry, a conference series about title subject
