= Gmelanone =

Names
- Preferred IUPAC name (1R,2S,5S)-2,5-Di(2H-1,3-benzodioxol-5-yl)-3,6-dioxabicyclo[3.2.1]octan-8-one

Identifiers
CAS Number	54826-95-8
3D model (JSmol)	Interactive image
ChemSpider	10308036
PubChem CID	21722946
CompTox Dashboard (EPA)	DTXSID401031412
- InChI: InChI=1S/C20H16O7/c21-19-13-7-27-20(19,12-2-4-15-17(6-12)26-10-24-15)8-22-18(13)11-1-3-14-16(5-11)25-9-23-14/h1-6,13,18H,7-10H2/t13-,18-,20-/m1/s1 Key: NNFGXXXVGRYOSF-CFSSXQINSA-N
- SMILES: O=C4[C@@H]1CO[C@]4(CO[C@@H]1c2ccc3OCOc3c2)c5ccc6OCOc6c5

Properties
Chemical formula	C_{20}H_{16}O_{7}
Molar mass	368.341 g·mol^{−1}
- Except where otherwise noted, data are given for materials in their standard state (at 25 °C [77 °F], 100 kPa). Infobox references

Gmelanone is a lignan found in the heartwood of Gmelina arborea. Arboreol can be transformed by acid catalysis into gmelanone.
