= Lauriane Doumbouya =

First Lady of Guinea

First Lady of Guinea
- Assumed role 5 September 2021
- President: Mamady Doumbouya
- Preceded by: Djene Kaba Condé

Personal details
- Born: Lauriane Darboux Chabeuil, France
- Spouse: Mamady Doumbouya
- Children: 4

Lauriane Doumbouya (née Darboux) is the First Lady of Guinea since 5 September 2021. A French citizen, she is the wife of General Mamady Doumbouya.

== Biography ==
=== Career in France ===
Lauriane Darboux was born in Chabeuil, France. She completed a three-month assistant gendarme training course at the Tulle school in 2005. She met her future husband Mamady Doumbouya at that time. A good horseback rider, she joined the Republican Guard in 2006.

The same year, she was trained as a non-commissioned officer in Libourne. She then returned to her native town, Chabeuil, and her career as a gendarme kicked off. She received bonuses for exceptional results in 2011 and 2014. She became a judicial police officer at the gendarmerie in April 2016 and maréchal des logis-chef in 2017.

Until only a few weeks before her departure for Africa, she was posted to the Burglary Investigation and Intervention Brigade in Valence, Drôme.

=== First Lady of Guinea ===
When her husband took power in the 2021 Guinean coup d'état, Lauriane became the First Lady of Guinea. She was not known in Guinea. She was present at her husband's inauguration on 1 October 2021. In 2023, she offered condolences after the deadly summer floods in Coyah and Kindia. She presided over the Miss Guinée 2023 ceremony. In 2024, she engaged in multiple diplomatic activities.

== Personal life ==
Darboux's family is from the south of France. Since 2011, she has been married to the Guinean interim president Mamady Doumbouya, whom she met shortly after his arrival in France, in 2005. The couple have five children (two daughters and three sons).

Honorary titles
Preceded by Djene Kaba Condé	First Lady of Guinea; 2021–Present	Succeeded by Incumbent
