= Gummadiol =

Names
- Preferred IUPAC name (2R,3R,3aS,6S,6aR)-3,6-Di(2H-1,3-benzodioxol-5-yl)dihydro-1H,3H-furo[3,4-c]furan-1,3a(4H)-diol
- Other names 1,4-Dihydroxysesamin

Identifiers
CAS Number	57684-87-4
3D model (JSmol)	Interactive image
ChemSpider	10308017
PubChem CID	21722930
CompTox Dashboard (EPA)	DTXSID501045325
- InChI: InChI=1S/C20H18O8/c21-19-16-17(10-1-3-12-14(5-10)26-8-24-12)23-7-20(16,22)18(28-19)11-2-4-13-15(6-11)27-9-25-13/h1-6,16-19,21-22H,7-9H2/t16-,17+,18+,19+,20+/m0/s1 Key: KCQXLVHWDSFFDF-OMQSBVIBSA-N
- SMILES: O[C@@H]5O[C@H](c1ccc2OCOc2c1)[C@@]6(O)CO[C@H](c3ccc4OCOc4c3)[C@@H]56

Properties
Chemical formula	C_{20}H_{18}O_{8}
Molar mass	386.356 g·mol^{−1}
- Except where otherwise noted, data are given for materials in their standard state (at 25 °C [77 °F], 100 kPa). Infobox references

Gummadiol is a lignan hemiacetal. It can be isolated from the heartwood of Gmelina arborea.
