= 8,5'-Diferulic acid =

8,5′-Diferulic acid

Names
- Preferred IUPAC name (2E)-2-{5-[(E)-2-Carboxyethen-1-yl]-2-hydroxy-3-methoxyphenyl}-3-(4-hydroxy-3-methoxyphenyl)prop-2-enoic acid
- Other names 8,5′-DiFA; Ferulic acid 8-5-dehydrodimer 8,5′-diFA (open form); 8,5-DiFA; 5-8′-Dehydrodiferulic acid

Identifiers
CAS Number	180579-78-6
3D model (JSmol)	Interactive image
ChEBI	CHEBI:88363
ChemSpider	8560889
PubChem CID	10385447
CompTox Dashboard (EPA)	DTXSID201045390
- InChI: InChI=1S/C20H18O8/c1-27-16-9-11(3-5-15(16)21)8-14(20(25)26)13-7-12(4-6-18(22)23)10-17(28-2)19(13)24/h3-10,21,24H,1-2H3,(H,22,23)(H,25,26)/b6-4+,14-8+ Key: DEPVSDIYICBTJE-SITOFEAGSA-N; InChI=1/C20H18O8/c1-27-16-9-11(3-5-15(16)21)8-14(20(25)26)13-7-12(4-6-18(22)23)10-17(28-2)19(13)24/h3-10,21,24H,1-2H3,(H,22,23)(H,25,26)/b6-4+,14-8+ Key: DEPVSDIYICBTJE-SITOFEAGBF
- SMILES: O=C(O)\C=C\c1cc(OC)c(O)c(c1)/C(=C\c2ccc(O)c(OC)c2)C(=O)O

Properties
Chemical formula	C_{20}H_{18}O_{8}
Molar mass	386.356 g·mol^{−1}
- Except where otherwise noted, data are given for materials in their standard state (at 25 °C [77 °F], 100 kPa). Infobox references

8,5′-Diferulic acid is a non cyclic type of diferulic acid. It is the predominant diferulic acid in sugar beet pulp. It is also found in barley, in maize bran and rye. 8,5′-Diferulic acid has also been identified to be covalently linked to carbohydrate moieties of the arabinogalactan-protein fraction of gum arabic.

== See also ==
- Decarboxylated 8,5'-diferulic acid
