= Fatoumata Kaba =

Guinean journalist

Fatoumata Lejeune-Kaba
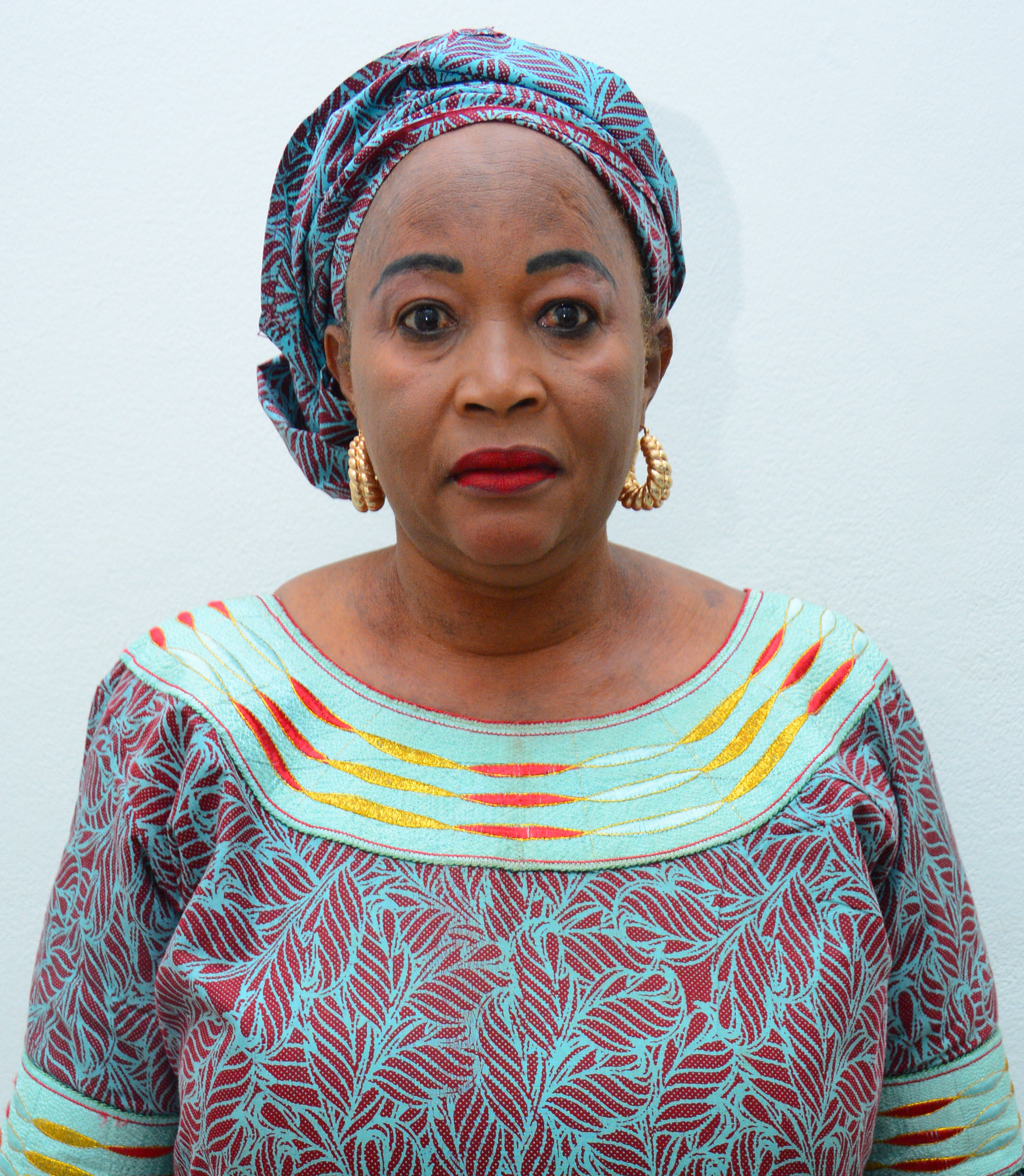
- Fatoumata Lejeune-Kaba
- Born: 1969 (age 56–57)
- Citizenship: Guinea
- Education: Montgomery College, Maryland
- Occupation: Journalist
- Employer: UNHCR

Fatoumata Lejeune-Kaba (born 1969) is a Guinean journalist who works for the UNHCR as Communications Officer.

Kaba was educated in the United States, attending Woodrow Wilson High School in Washington, D.C., and Montgomery College in Maryland, graduating with a degree in journalism. She returned to Guinea in 1992, working for Guinean Radio and Television and CNN in 1998, she became a correspondent for Reuters news agency. Subsequently, she worked for the Communications Unit of the United Nations Development Programme before joining the United Nations High Commission for Refugees (UNHCR) in 2000.

On February 25, 2002, Kaba was appointed as the delegate of the UNHCR for the Democratic Republic of the Congo, the Republic of the Congo, the Central African Republic, Gabon, Cameroon, and Uganda; she was based in Kinshasa. She was also in Ivory Coast or Côte d'Ivoire after that. She is currently in Geneva as the Communications Officer covering Central, East, West and Southern Africa and Statistics.
