= Gums and Stabilisers for the Food Industry =

Gums and Stabilisers for the Food Industry is a biennial conference (see the official website) held in Wrexham, North Wales, since 1981, on the application of hydrocolloids (polysaccharides and proteins) in the food industry. Presentations at the conference cover recent advances in the structure, function and applications of gums and stabilisers, how these materials are used in industrial processes, and also educational material on the subject. The proceedings of each conference have been published (see below), with the most recent (9th through 16th conferences) published by the Royal Society of Chemistry. The conference series is organized by the Food Hydrocolloids Trust. In 2025, the 22nd conference was held in Wageningen in the Netherlands.

== History of the conference ==
The intention of the conference series is to provide a forum for the free exchange of ideas between academia and industry and to promote the use and understanding of hydrocolloids in foods. Because hydrocolloids are sourced and used in all of the continents except Antarctica, and many types (such as resins, seed gums, and certain alginates) are obtained from specific countries or climate zones, the conference attracts an international attendance from Europe, Asia, North America, Australia, Africa and the Middle East.

The first conference series was held at Glyndŵr University in Wrexham in 1981, chaired by Professor Glyn O Phillips (also of Glyndŵr University), and all subsequent conferences have taken place at the same location and with the same chairman. Th eonly exception to this was the 2011 conference, held in Wageningen in the Netherlands. Until 2008, Glyndŵr University was known as the North-East Wales Institute of Higher Education (NEWI).

- Gums and Stabilisers for the Food Industry

Date of conference: July 1981
Editors: G. O. Phillips, D. J. Wedlock and P. A. Williams
Published by: Pergamon Press Ltd., Oxford Vol 6 (1982). ISBN 0-08-026843-9.

- Gums and Stabilisers for the Food Industry 2

Date of conference: July 1983
Editors: G. O. Phillips, D. J. Wedlock and P. A. Williams
Published by: Pergamon Press Ltd., Oxford (1984). ISBN 0-08-029819-2.

- Gums and Stabilisers for the Food Industry 3

Date of conference: July 1985
Editors: G. O. Phillips, D. J. Wedlock and P. A. Williams
Published by: Elsevier Applied Science Publishers (1986). ISBN 0-85334-423-X.
Topics: Part 1: Analysis, structure and properties; Part 2: Applications; Part 3: Interactions; Part 4: Recent developments – future trends.

- Gums and Stabilisers for the Food Industry 4

Date of conference: July 1987
Editors: G. O. Phillips, D. J. Wedlock and P. A. Williams
Published by: IRL Press, Oxford, (1988). ISBN 1-85221-087-7.
Topics: Part 1: Analysis, structure and properties; Part 2: Gelation and rheological properties; Part 3 Applications; Part 4: Emulsion stabilisation; Part 5: Current developments.

- Gums and Stabilisers for the Food Industry 5

Date of conference: July 1989
Editors: G. O. Phillips, D. J. Wedlock and P. A. Williams
Published by: Oxford University Press Ltd., Oxford, (1990). ISBN 0-19-963061-5.
Topics: Part 1: Gum arabic and other gum exudates; Part 2: Starch; Part 3: Gelatin and other food proteins; Part 4: Pectin; Part 5: Microbial polysaccharides; Part 6: Cellulosics and seed gums; Part 7: Marine polysaccharides.

- Gums and Stabilisers for the Food Industry 6

Date of conference: July 1991
Editors: Phillips G. O., Williams P. A. and Wedlock D. J.
Published by: Oxford University Press Ltd, Oxford (1992). ISBN 0-19-963284-7.
Topics: Part 1: End use considerations; Part 2: Structure and rheology; Part 3: Synergism; Part 4: Processing; Part 5: Emulsions stabilisation; Part 6: Low calorie products; Part 7: New developments.

- Gums and Stabilisers for the Food Industry 7

Date of conference: July 1993
Editors: Phillips G. O., Williams, P. A. and Wedlock D. J.
Published by: Oxford University Press, Oxford (1994). ISBN 0-19-963465-3.
Topics: Part 1: Characterisation; Part 2: Emulsions and foams; Part 3: Processing; Part 4: Health and nutrition; Part 5: Rheology; Part 6: Interactions; Part 7: Applications.

- Gums and Stabilisers for the Food Industry 8

Date of conference: July 1995
Editors: Phillips G. O., Williams, P. A. and Wedlock D. J.
Published by: Oxford University Press (1996). ISBN 0-19-963627-3.
Topics: Part 1: The role of hydration processes in product formulation; Part 2: Stabilisation of chilled and frozen products; Part 3: Biopolymer characterization; Part 4: Biopolymer interactions; Part 5: Incompatibility and phase separation of biopolymers; Part 6: Practical applications of mixed biopolymers; Part 7: High pressure and high temperature processing; Part 8: Functionality of hydrocolloids in low moisture products; Part 9: New materials and emerging techniques.

- Gums and Stabilisers for the Food Industry 9

Date of conference: July 1997
Editors: Williams, P. A. and Phillips, G.O.
Published by: Royal Society of Chemistry, Cambridge, UK (1998). ISBN 0-85404-708-5.

- Gums and Stabilisers for the Food Industry 10

Date of conference: 5 to 9 July 1999
Editors: Williams, P. A. and Phillips G.O.
Published by: Royal Society of Chemistry, Cambridge, UK (2000). ISBN 0-85404-820-0.
Topics: Polysaccharide characterization; Polysaccharide gelation; Mixed biopolymer systems; High solid systems; Proteins and emulsions; Recent developments, future trends.

- Gums and Stabilisers for the Food Industry 11

Date of conference: 2 to 6 July 2001
Editors: Williams, P. A. and Phillips G.O.
Published by: Royal Society of Chemistry, Cambridge, UK (2002). ISBN 0-85404-836-7.
Topics: Market overview; Structure, characterization and interactions; Rheological aspects; Hydrocolloids in real food systems; Interfacial behaviour and gelation of proteins; New materials; Hydrocolloids and health.

- Gums and Stabilisers for the Food Industry 12

Date of conference: July 2003
Editors: Williams, P.A. and Phillips, G.O.
Published by: Royal Society of Chemistry, Cambridge, UK (2004). ISBN 0-85404-891-X.

- Gums and Stabilisers for the Food Industry 13

Date of conference: July 2005
Editors: Williams, P.A. and Phillips, G.O.
Published by: Royal Society of Chemistry, Cambridge, UK (2006). ISBN 978-0-85404-673-7.

- Gums and Stabilisers for the Food Industry 14

Date of conference: July 2007
Editors: Williams, P.A. and Phillips, G.O.
Published by: Royal Society of Chemistry, Cambridge, UK (2008). ISBN 978-0-85404-461-0.

- Gums and Stabilisers for the Food Industry 15

Date of conference: July 2009
Title: Biofunctionality and technofunctionality
Editors: Williams, P.A. and Phillips, G.O.
Published by: Royal Society of Chemistry, Cambridge, UK (2010). ISBN 978-1-84755-199-3.

- Gums and Stabilisers for the Food Industry 16

Date of conference: July 2011
Editors: Williams, P.A. and Phillips, G.O.
Published by: Royal Society of Chemistry, Cambridge, UK (2012). ISBN 978-1-84973-358-8.
Topics: Market overview; Isolation, characterization and modification; Mixed hydrocolloid systems; Hydrocolloid gels; Emulsions; Fibres and films; Microstructure and texture; Food applications; Health - related aspects.

- Gums and Stabilisers for the Food Industry 17: The Changing Face of Food Manufacture: The Role of Hydrocolloids

Date of conference: June 2013
Editors: Williams, P.A. and Phillips, G.O.
Published by: Royal Society of Chemistry, Cambridge, UK (2014). ISBN 978-1-84973-883-5.
Topics:

== The 2015 conference ==
Entitled "Gums and Stabilisers for the Food Industry 18: Hydrocolloid functionality for affordable and sustainable global food solutions" took place June 23-26 2013 in Wrexham, North Wales.

- Organizing committee:

Dr M. Capelle, Nestle, Lausanne, Switzerland
Dr R. S. Farr, Unilever Research and Development, Colworth House, UK
Dr T. J. Foster, University of Nottingham, UK
Mr H. Hughes (Administrative Secretary), Glyndŵr University
Dr A. Imeson, FMC Corporation
Dr A. Koliandris, Mars/Effem GmbH, Germany
Dr Johann Lukanowski, Doehler
Professor E. R. Morris, University College Cork, Ireland
Professor B. S. Murray, School of Food Science and Nutrition, Leeds, UK
Professor G. O. Phillips (Chairman), Phillips Hydrocolloids Research Ltd
Dr C. Rolin, CP Kelco, Denmark
Dr F. Spyropoulos, University of Birmingham, UK
Dr G. Sworn, Danisco, France
Dr A. Tziboula-Clarke, ISP (International Specialty Products)
Dr C. Viebke, Kerry Ingredients
Dr P. Wilde, IFR, Norwich, UK
Professor P.A. Williams (Scientific Secretary), Glyndŵr University

- Industrial sponsors:

...
