= Gum arabic =

Natural gum obtained from Acacia trees

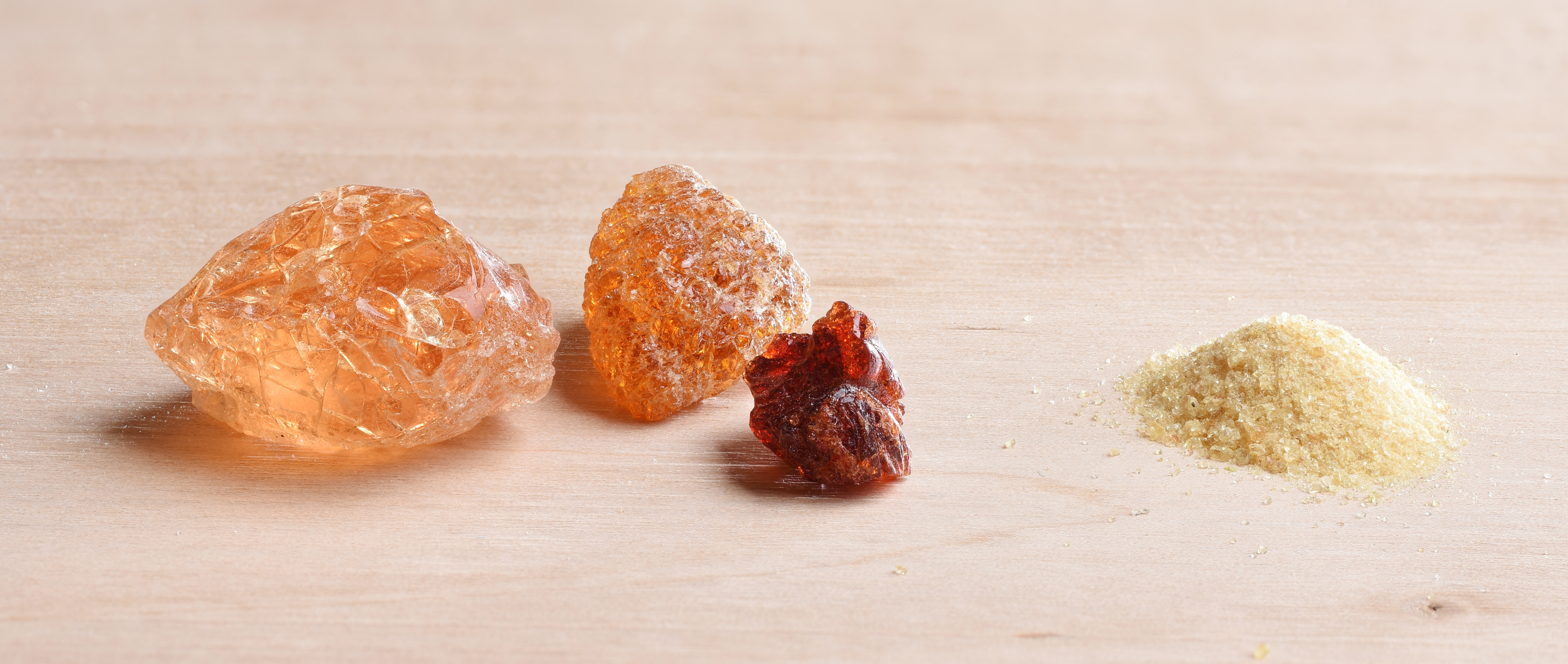
Acacia gum, pieces and powder

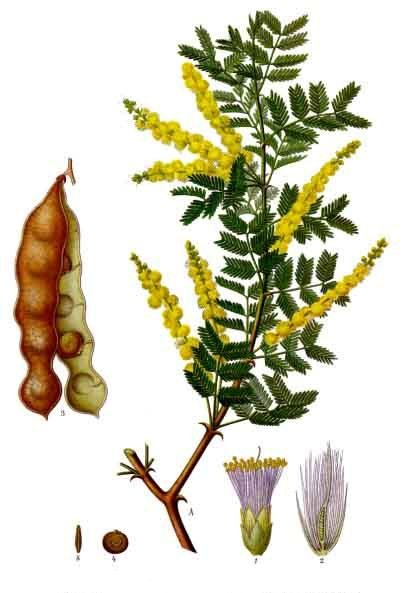
Acacia senegal, pictured in the medicinal handbook Köhler's Medizinal-Pflanzen (1887) by Franz Eugen Köhler

Gum arabic (also known as gum acacia, gum sudani, Senegal gum and by other names (Note: including acacia gum, acacia, Arabic gum, and Indian gum; Arabic: صمغ عربي, romanized: ṣamḡ ʕarabī)) is a tree gum best known by two most popular species of Acacia sensu lato: Senegalia senegal and Vachellia seyal; although there are over 900 species of trees in the genus. However, the term "gum arabic" does not indicate a particular botanical source. The gum is harvested commercially from wild trees, mostly in Sudan (about 70% of the global supply) and throughout the Sahel, from Senegal to Somalia. The name "gum Arabic" (Arabic: الصمغ العربي, romanized: aṣ-ṣamḡ al-ʕarabī) was used in the Middle East at least as early as the 9th century. Gum arabic first found its way to Europe via Arabic ports and retained its name of origin.

Gum arabic is a complex mixture of glycoproteins and polysaccharides, predominantly polymers of arabinose and galactose. It is soluble in water, edible, and used primarily in the food industry and soft drink industry as a stabilizer, with E number E414 (I414 in the US). Gum arabic is a key ingredient in traditional lithography and is used in printing, paints, glues, cosmetics, and various industrial applications, including viscosity control in inks and in textile industries.

== Definition ==
Gum arabic was defined by the 31st Codex Committee for Food Additives, held at The Hague from 19 to 23 March 1999, as the dried exudate from the trunks and branches of Acacia senegal or Vachellia (Acacia) seyal in the family Fabaceae (Leguminosae). A 2017 safety re-evaluation by the Panel on Food Additives and Nutrient Sources of the European Food Safety Authority (EFSA) said that although the above definition holds true for most internationally traded samples, the term "gum arabic" does not indicate a particular botanical source; in a few cases, so‐called "gum arabic" may not even have been collected from Acacia (in the broad sense) species, instead coming from, e.g., Combretum or Albizia.

== Health benefits ==
Gum arabic is a rich source of dietary fibers. In addition to its widespread use in food and pharmaceutical industries as a safe thickener, emulsifier, and stabilizer, it also possesses a broad range of health benefits that have been proven through in vitro and in vivo studies. Gum arabic is not degraded in the stomach, but fermented in the large intestine into a number of short chain fatty acids. Some health benefits may be present, but further verification is required. These health benefits include:

- Improved absorption of calcium from the gastrointestinal tract
- Anti-diabetic
- Anti-obesity (gum arabic lowers body mass index and body fat percentage)
- Lipid-lowering potential (gum arabic decreases total cholesterol, LDL, and triglyceride)
- Antioxidant activities
- Kidney and liver support
- Immune function via modulating the release of some inflammatory mediators
- Improving intestinal barrier function, preventing colon cancer, and alleviating symptoms of irritable bowel diseases
- In rats, a protective effect on the intestine against the adverse actions of the NSAID drug meloxicam

== Uses ==
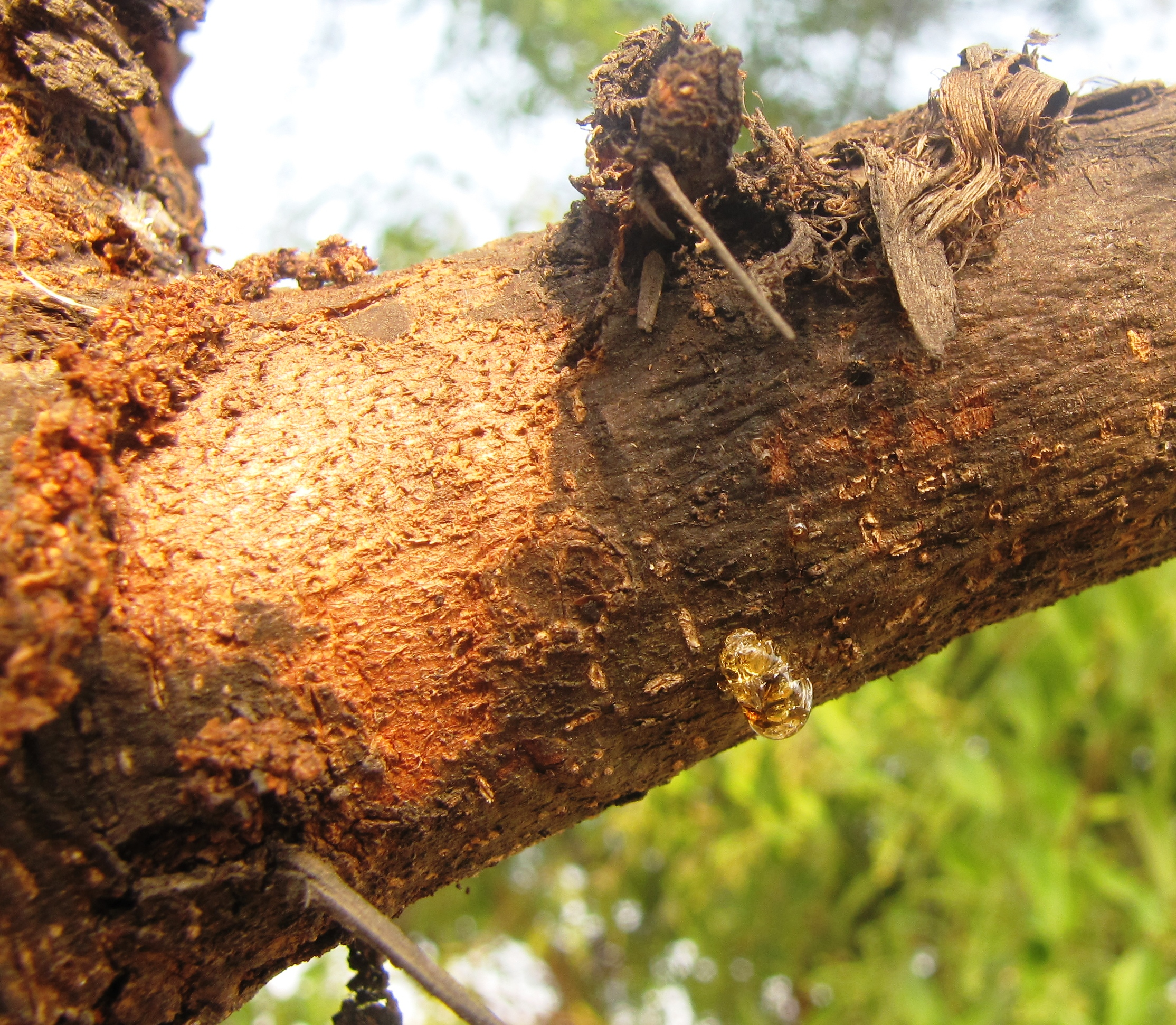
Gum arabic exuding from Acacia nilotica

Gum arabic's mixture of polysaccharides and glycoproteins gives it the properties of a glue and binder that is edible by humans. Other substances have replaced it where toxicity is not an issue, as the proportions of chemicals in gum arabic vary widely and make it unpredictable. It remains an important ingredient in soft drink syrup and "hard" gummy candies such as gumdrops, marshmallows, and M&M's chocolate candies. For artists, it is the traditional binder in watercolor paint and in photography for gum printing, and it is used as a binder in pyrotechnic compositions. Pharmaceutical drugs and cosmetics also use the gum as a binder, emulsifier, and suspending agent or viscosity-increasing agent. Wine makers have used gum arabic as a wine fining agent.

It is an important ingredient in shoe polish, and can be used in making homemade incense cones. It is also used as a lickable adhesive, for example on postage stamps, envelopes, and cigarette papers. Lithographic printers employ it to keep the non-image areas of the plate receptive to water. This treatment also helps to stop oxidation of aluminium printing plates in the interval between processing of the plate and its use on a printing press.

=== Food ===
Gum arabic is used in the food industry as a stabiliser, emulsifying agent, and thickening agent in icing, fillings, soft candy, chewing gum, and other confectionery, and to bind the sweeteners and flavorings in soft drinks. A solution of sugar and gum arabic in water, gomme syrup, is sometimes used in cocktails to prevent the sugar from crystallising and provide a smooth texture.

Gum arabic is a complex polysaccharide and soluble dietary fibre that is generally recognized as safe for human consumption. An indication of harmless flatulence occurs in some people taking large doses of 30 g (1 oz) or more per day. It is not degraded in the intestine, but fermented in the colon under the influence of microorganisms; it is a prebiotic (as distinct from a probiotic). No regulatory or scientific consensus has been reached about its caloric value; an upper limit of 2 kcal/g (8.4 kJ/g) was set for rats, but this is invalid for humans. The US FDA initially set a value of 4 kcal/g (17 kJ/g) for food labelling, but in Europe no value was assigned for soluble dietary fibre. A 1998 review concluded that "based on present scientific knowledge, only an arbitrary value can be used for regulatory purposes". In 2008, the FDA sent a letter of no objection in response to an application to reduce the rated caloric value of gum arabic to 1.7 kcal/g (7.1 kJ/g).

=== Painting and art ===
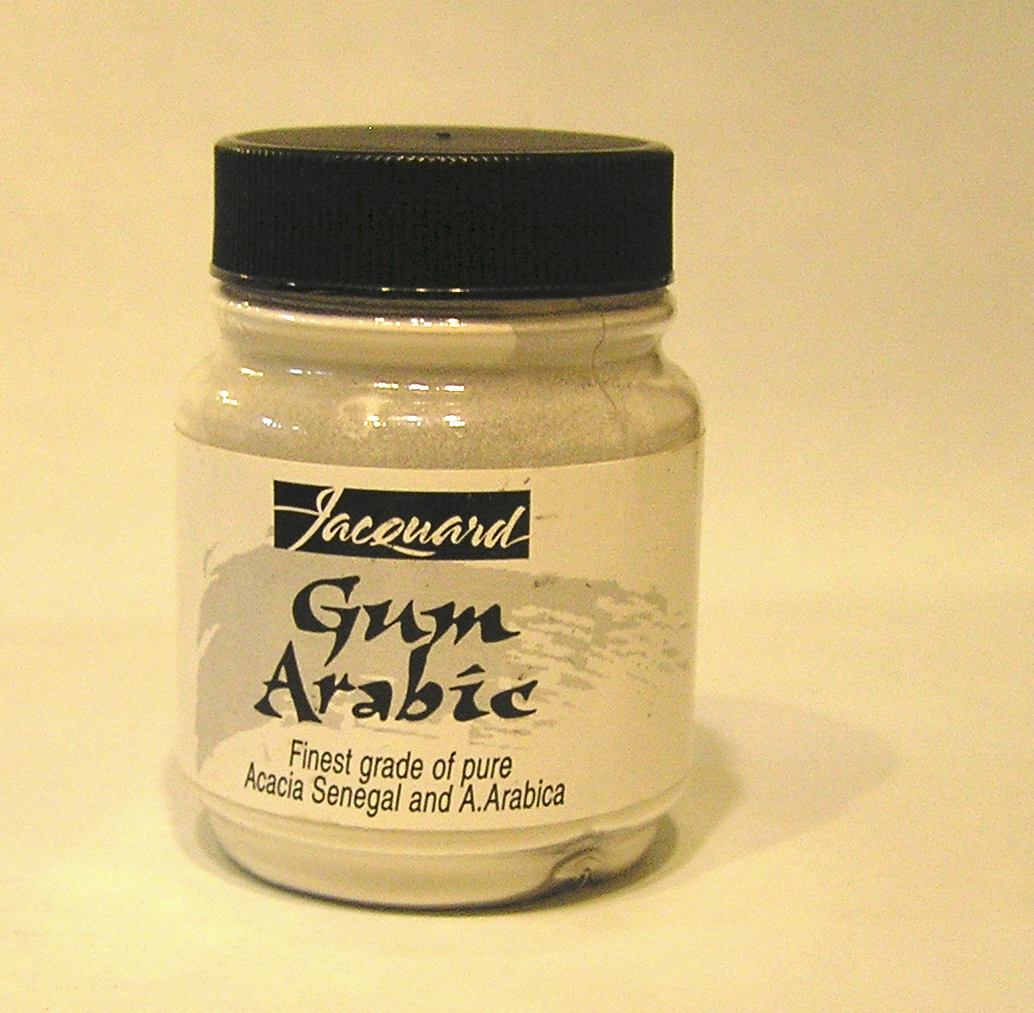
Powdered gum arabic for artists, one part of which is dissolved in four parts distilled water to make a liquid suitable for adding to pigments

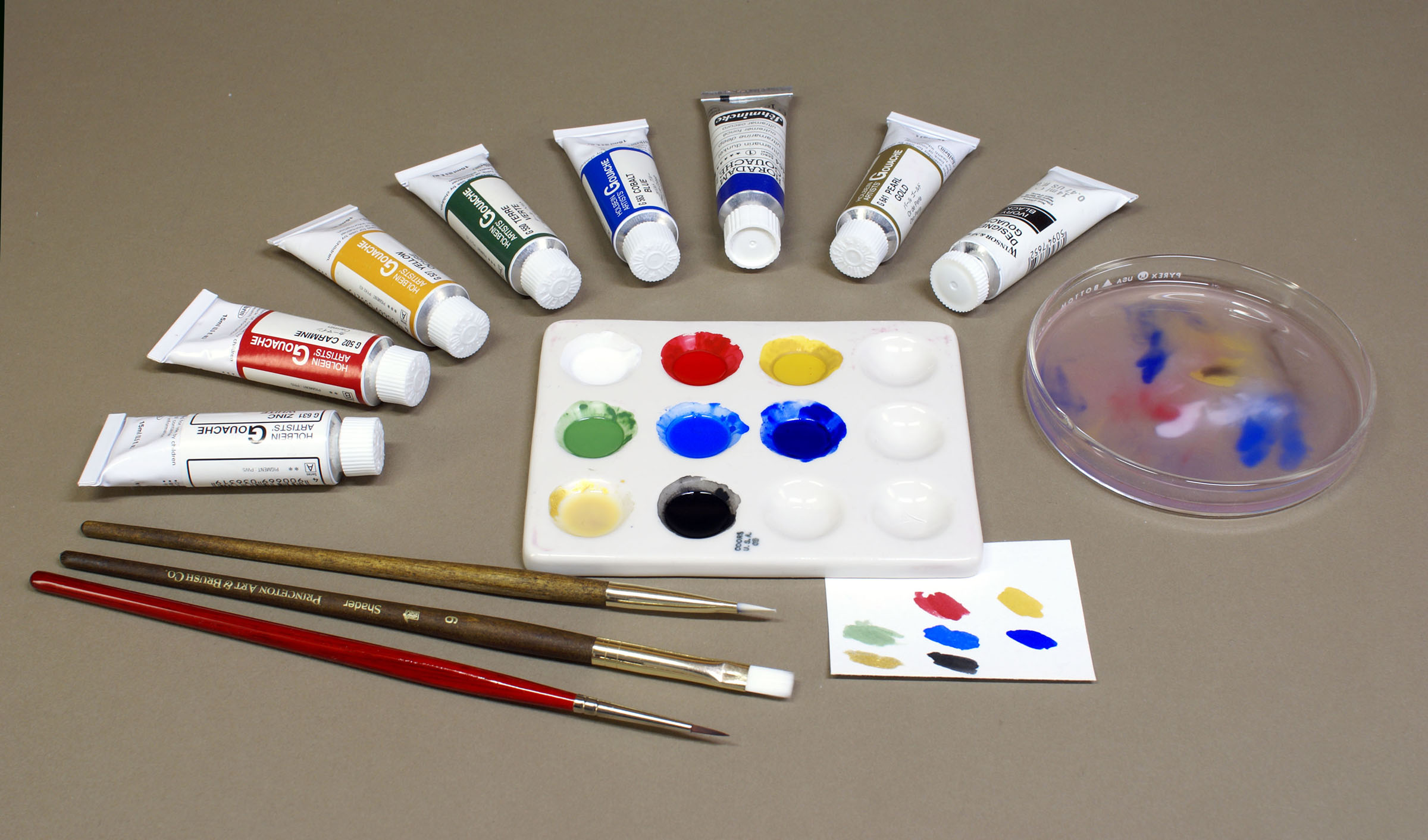
A selection of gouaches, some containing gum arabic

Gum arabic is used as a binder for watercolor painting because it dissolves easily in water. Pigment of any color is suspended within the acacia gum in varying amounts, resulting in watercolor paint. Water acts as a vehicle or a diluent to thin the watercolor paint and helps to transfer the paint to a surface such as paper. When all moisture evaporates, the acacia gum typically does not bind the pigment to the paper surface, but is totally absorbed by deeper layers.

If little water is used, after evaporation, the acacia gum functions as a true binder in a paint film, increasing luminosity and helping prevent the colors from lightening. Gum arabic allows more subtle control over washes, because it facilitates the dispersion of the pigment particles. In addition, acacia gum slows evaporation of water, giving slightly longer working time.

The addition of a little gum arabic to watercolor pigment and water allows for easier lifting of pigment from paper, thus can be a useful tool when lifting out color when painting in watercolor.

=== Ceramics ===
Gum arabic has a long history as additives to ceramic glazes. It acts as a binder, helping the glaze adhere to the clay before it is fired, thereby minimising damage by handling during the manufacture of the piece. As a secondary effect, it also acts as a deflocculant, increasing the fluidity of the glaze mixture, but also making it more likely to sediment out into a hard cake if not used for a while.

The gum is normally made up into a solution in hot water (typically 10–25 g/L), and then added to the glaze solution after any ball milling in concentrations from 0.02% to 3.0% of gum arabic to the dry weight of the glaze. On firing, the gum burns out at a low temperature, leaving no residues in the glaze. More recently, particularly in commercial manufacturing, gum arabic is often replaced by more refined and consistent alternatives, such as carboxymethyl cellulose.

=== Photography ===
The historical photography process of gum bichromate photography uses gum arabic mixed with ammonium or potassium dichromate and pigment to create a coloured photographic emulsion that becomes relatively insoluble in water upon exposure to ultraviolet light. Unreacted gum remains soluble and can be washed off in warm water so that the reacted gum arabic permanently binds the pigments onto the paper in the final print.

=== Printmaking ===
Gum arabic is also used to protect and etch an image in lithographic processes, both from traditional stones and aluminum plates. In lithography, gum by itself may be used to etch very light tones, such as those made with a number-five crayon. Phosphoric, nitric, or tannic acid is added in varying concentrations to the acacia gum to etch the darker tones up to dark blacks. The etching process creates a gum adsorb layer within the matrix that attracts water, ensuring that the oil-based ink does not stick to those areas. Gum is also essential to what is sometimes called paper lithography, printing from an image created by a laser printer or photocopier.

=== Pyrotechnics ===
Gum arabic is also used as a water-soluble binder in fireworks composition.

== Composition ==
Arabinogalactan is a biopolymer consisting of arabinose and galactose monosaccharides. It is a major component of many plant gums, including gum arabic. 8-5' Noncyclic diferulic acid has been identified as covalently linked to carbohydrate moieties of the arabinogalactan-protein fraction.

== Production ==
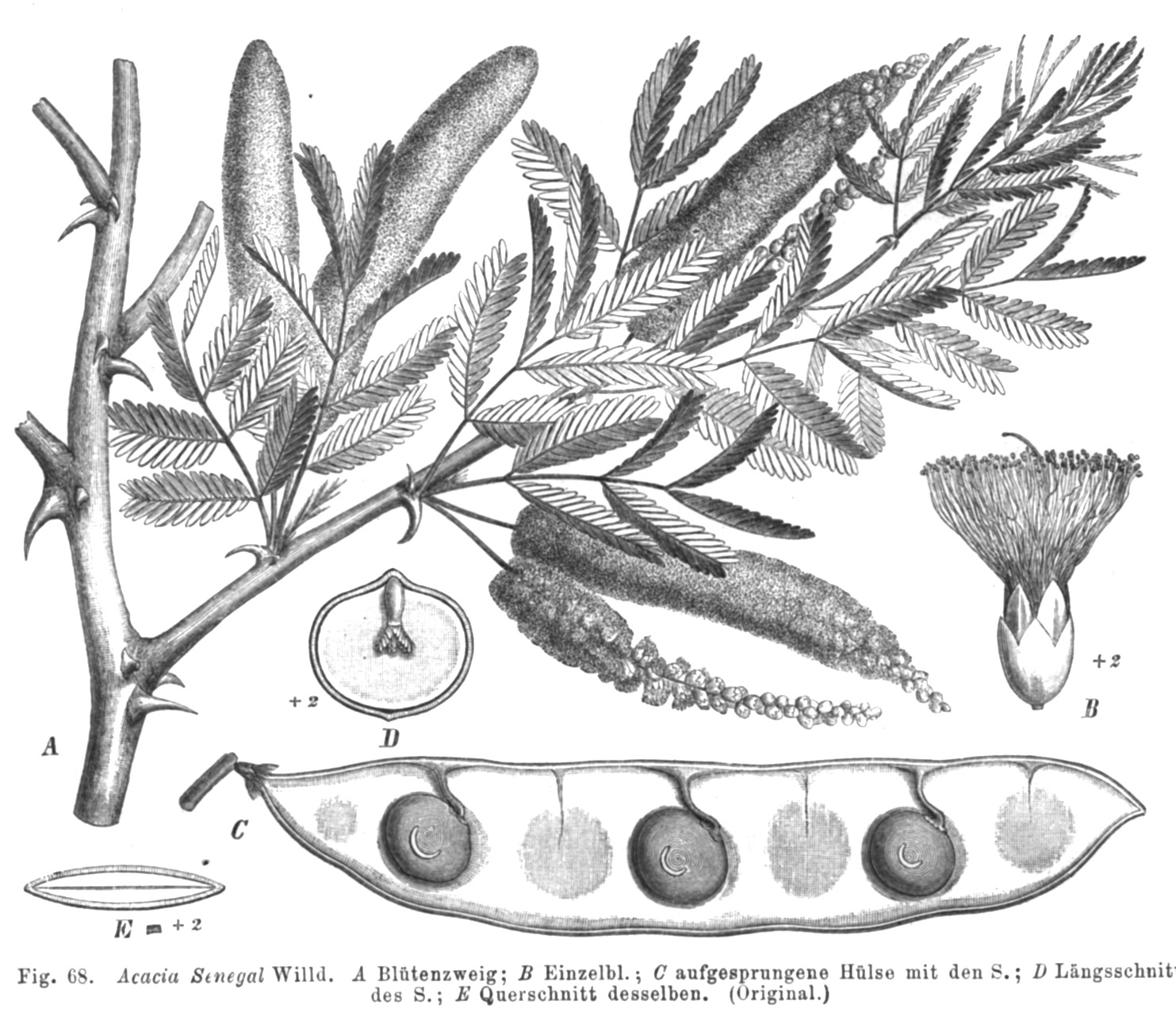
Acacia senegal from Paul Hermann Wilhelm Taubert's Leguminosae, in Engelmann (ed.): Natürliche Pflanzenfamilien. Vol. III, 3., 1891

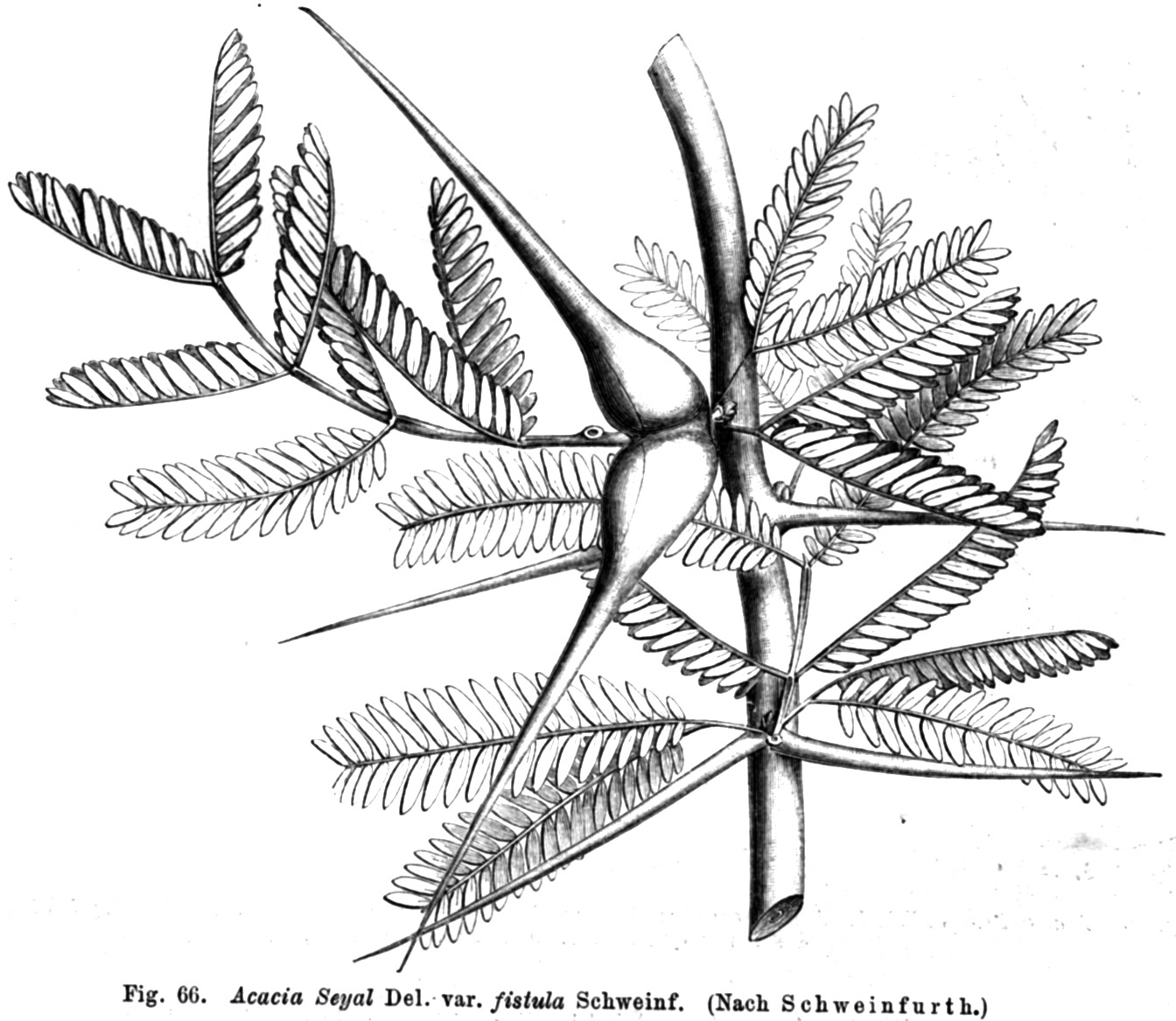
Vachellia seyal from Paul Hermann Wilhelm Taubert's Leguminosae, in Engelmann (ed.): Natürliche Pflanzenfamilien. Vol. III, 3., 1891

While gum arabic has been harvested in Arabia and West Asia since antiquity, sub-Saharan acacia gum has a long history as a prized export. The gum exported came from the band of acacia trees that once covered much of the Sahel region, the southern littoral of the Sahara Desert that runs from the Atlantic Ocean to the Red Sea. Today, the main populations of gum-producing Acacia species are found in Mauritania, Senegal, Mali, Burkina Faso, Niger, Nigeria, Chad, Cameroon, Sudan, Eritrea, Somalia, Ethiopia, Kenya, and Tanzania. Acacia is tapped for gum by stripping bits off the bark, from which gum then exudes. Traditionally harvested by seminomadic desert pastoralists in the course of their transhumance cycle, acacia gum remains a main export of several African nations, including Mauritania, Niger, Chad, and Sudan. Total world gum arabic exports were estimated in 2019 at 160,000 tonnes, having recovered from 1987 to 1989 and 2003–2005 crises caused by the destruction of trees by the desert locust.

== History ==
=== Political aspects ===
==== West Africa ====
In 1445, Prince Henry the Navigator set up a trading post on Arguin Island (off the coast of modern Mauritania), which acquired acacia gum and slaves for Portugal. With the merger of the Portuguese and Spanish crowns in 1580, the Spaniards became the dominant influence along the coast. In 1638, however, they were replaced by the Dutch, who were the first to begin exploiting the acacia gum trade. Produced by the acacia trees of Trarza and Brakna, this acacia gum was considered superior to that previously obtained in Arabia. By 1678, the French had driven out the Dutch and established a permanent settlement at Saint Louis at the mouth of the Senegal River. Gum Arabic came to play an essential role in textile printing and therefore in pre-industrial economies of France, Great Britain and other European countries. Throughout the 18th century, their competition over the commodity was so fierce, that some have referred to it as the gum wars.

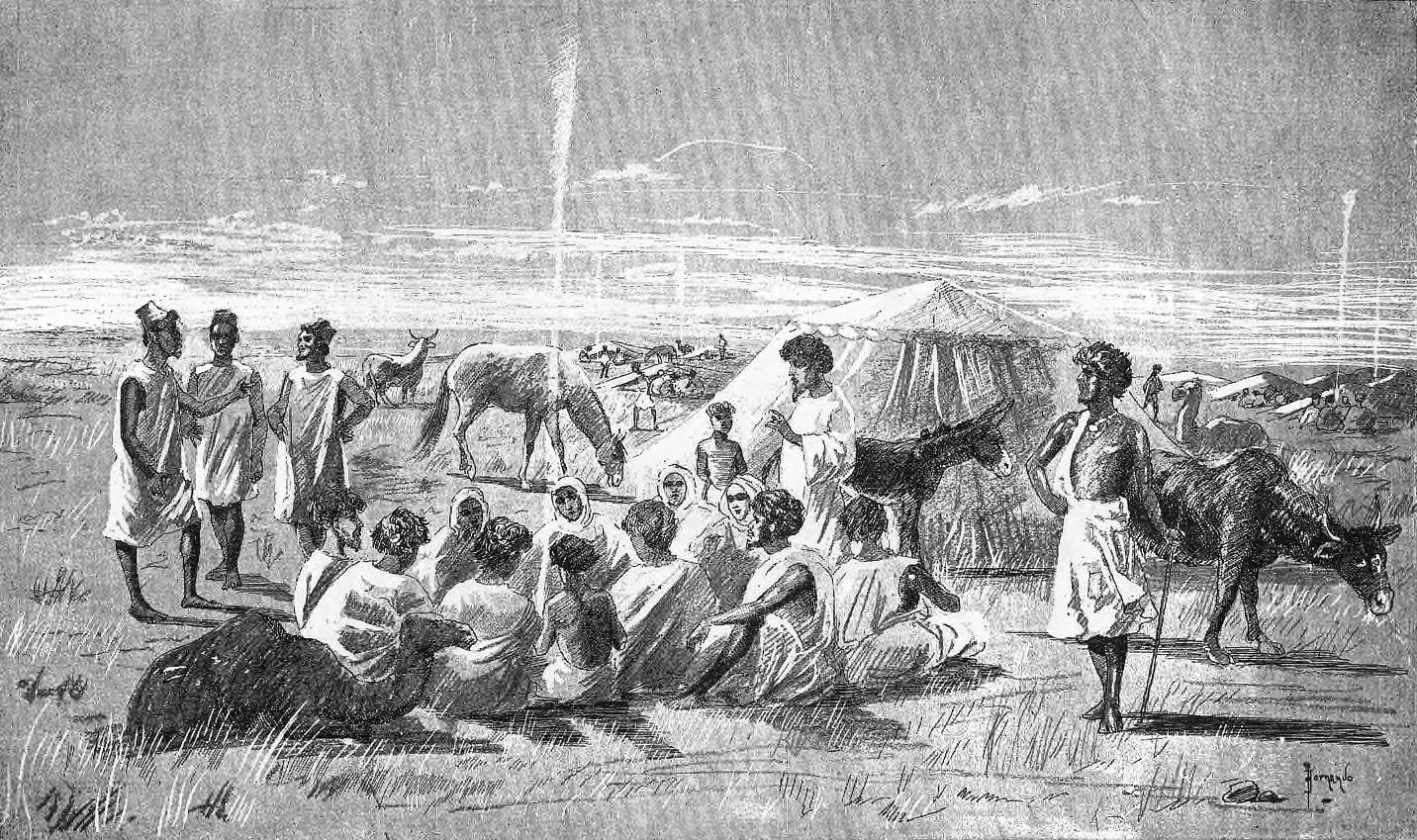
West African tribes meet to trade gum arabic at Bakel on the Senegal River, 1890 (illustration from "Côte occidentale d'Afrique du Colonel Frey", pl. en reg. p. 100)

For much of the 18th and 19th centuries, gum arabic was the major export from French and British trading colonies in modern Senegal and Mauritania. West Africa had become the sole supplier of world acacia gum by the 18th century, and its export at the French colony of Saint-Louis doubled in the decade of 1830 alone. A threat to bypass Saint-Louis and taxes by sending gum to the British traders at Portendick, eventually brought the Emirate of Trarza into direct conflict with the French. In the 1820s, the French launched the Franco-Trarzan War of 1825. The new emir, Muhammad al Habib, had signed an agreement with the Waalo Kingdom, directly to the south of the river. In return for an end to raids in Waalo territory, the emir took the heiress of Waalo as a bride. The prospect that Trarza might inherit control of both banks of the Senegal struck at the security of French traders, and the French responded by sending a large expeditionary force that crushed Muhammad's army. The war incited the French to expand to the north of the Senegal River for the first time, heralding French direct involvement in the interior of West Africa. Africa continued to export gum arabic in large quantities—from the Sahel areas of French West Africa (modern Senegal, Mauritania, Mali, Burkina Faso, and Niger) and French Equatorial Africa (modern Chad) as well as British-administered Sudan, until these nations gained their independence in 1956–61.

==== Sudan ====
Since the 1950s, the global supply of gum arabic has been dominated by Sudan. In the early 2020s, about 70% of the global supply has been sourced from Sudan, with approximately 5 million Sudanese people (more than 10 percent of the country's population) being directly or indirectly dependent on gum arabic for their livelihoods. After market reforms in 2019, official figures showed that Sudan's exports of gum arabic were at about 60,000 tonnes in 2022, but exact numbers are difficult to ascertain because some production is in regions that are hard to access. Before the reforms, the production of gum arabic was heavily dominated by the Sudanese government and in some periods there were attempts of using its importance to the global market as a leverage against other countries. Since the 2023 Sudan conflict, the export of gum arabic has been interrupted, causing a crash in its price in Sudan because of a reduced ability to export the product, whereas international companies that rely on it are attempting to diversify the supply chain of gum arabic and find alternative ingredients that can be used as a replacement.

== Pharmacology ==
Gum arabic slows the rate of absorption of some drugs, including amoxicillin, from the gut.

== Symbolic value ==
In the works of English playwright William Shakespeare, Dutch poet Jacob Cats and other European poets of the 13th to 17th centuries, gum arabic represented the "noble Orient". In the Sahel, it is a symbol of the purity of youth.

== See also ==
- Kauri Gum
- Mastic (plant resin)
