= Arboreol =

Names
- IUPAC name (1R,4R,6aR)-1,4-Bis(1,3-benzodioxol-5-yl)dihydro-1H,3H-furo[3,4-c]furan-1,6a(6H)-diol
- Other names (7β,7'α,8α,8'α)-3,4:3',4'-bis(methylenedioxy)-7,9':7',9-diepoxylignane-7,8-diol

Identifiers
CAS Number	54868-71-2
3D model (JSmol)	Interactive image
ChemSpider	16737548
PubChem CID	101277405
CompTox Dashboard (EPA)	DTXSID101045323
- InChI: InChI=1S/C20H18O8/c21-19-8-23-18(11-1-3-14-16(5-11)26-9-24-14)13(19)7-28-20(19,22)12-2-4-15-17(6-12)27-10-25-15/h1-6,13,18,21-22H,7-10H2/t13-,18-,19-,20+/m1/s1 Key: WQZHIPWFEKLEJM-AQWZQNETSA-N
- SMILES: O[C@@]43CO[C@H](C4CO[C@]3(O)c1ccc2OCOc2c1)c5ccc6OCOc6c5

Properties
Chemical formula	C_{20}H_{18}O_{8}
Molar mass	386.356 g·mol^{−1}
- Except where otherwise noted, data are given for materials in their standard state (at 25 °C [77 °F], 100 kPa). Infobox references

Arboreol is an epoxylignan. Arboreol can be transformed by acid catalysis into gmelanone.
