= 2026 in Chad =

- Decades: 2000s; 2010s; 2020s
- See also: Other events of 2026; Timeline of Chadian history

The following events occurred in Chad in the year 2026.

== Incumbents ==
- President: Mahamat Déby
- Prime Minister: Allamaye Halina
- Vice President: vacant

== Events ==
=== January ===
- 13 January – Three soldiers and three rebels are killed in clashes between the army and the Movement for Peace, Reconstruction and Development (MPRD) in Korbol, Moyen-Chari.
- 15 January – The Sudan-based Rapid Support Forces carry out a cross-border attack into Chad, killing seven Chadian soldiers at the Birak garrison near Tiné Djagaraba.
- 16 January – President Mahamat Deby is awarded the 2026 African Peace Prize for his efforts in managing the country's political transition and accepting refugees from the Sudanese civil war (2023–present).

=== February ===
- 13 February – A French national is found dead in Ennedi after going missing from a tourist camp near Bachikele on 11 February.
- 23 February – Chad closes its border with Sudan after five Chadian soldiers and three civilians were killed, and 12 more people were injured, in clashes with militia groups affiliated with the Sudanese government that crossed the border into Wadi Fira region two days ago.

=== March ===
- 5 March – Timane Erdimi resigns as higher education minister.
- 18 March – A drone that originated from Sudan hits the border town of Tiné, killing 17 people.
- 19 March – Chad closes its border with Sudan in response to the drone strike on Tiné.

=== April ===
- 20 April – President Deby announces the deployment of 1,500 personnel of the Chadian National Army to Haiti as part of the Gang Suppression Force.
- 26 April – At least 42 people are killed in interethnic clashes in Wadi Fira caused by a dispute over a well.

=== May ===
- 4 May – Twenty-three soldiers are killed in an attack by Boko Haram militants on a garrison in Barka Tolorom island.
- 8 May – The High Court of N'Djamena sentences eight leaders of the opposition Political Actors Consultation Group (GCAP) to eight years imprisonment on charges of rebellion and disturbing public order.

=== July ===
- 22 July – A drone that originated from Sudan hits Tiné Djagaraba, injuring several people.
- 28 July – Chad declares plans to withdraw from the International Criminal Court, accusing it of inefficiency and bias against African nations.

=== August ===
- 27 August – Chad accuses the Sudanese Armed Forces of carrying out an airstrike on a fuel market used by the Rapid Support Forces near the Chad–Sudan border in the Ennedi region, killing 12 people and injuring seven others; the military alert level in the area is raised to the highest level.

=== October ===
- 20 October – A drone strike on Bamina kills three Sudanese refugees and two aid workers.

== Holidays ==
- 1 January – New Year's Day
- 8 March – International Women's Day
- 30 March – Eid al-Fitr
- 21 April – Easter Monday
- 1 May – Labour Day
- 6 June – Eid al-Adha
- 11 August – Independence Day
- 4 September – The Prophet's Birthday
- 1 November – All Saints' Day
- 28 November – Republic Day
- 1 December – Freedom and Democracy Day
- 25 December – Christmas Day

== Deaths ==
- 28 January: Antoine Bangui, 92, political figure and author.
- October: Isaac Tédambé, 72, economist and novelist.
