= 2022 in Chad =

- Decades: 2000s; 2010s; 2020s
- See also: Other events of 2022; Timeline of Chadian history

Events in the year 2022 in Chad.

== Incumbents ==
- President: Mahamat Déby
- Prime Minister: Albert Pahimi Padacké (until October 12), Saleh Kebzabo (starting October 12)
- Vice President: Djimadoum Tiraina

== Events ==
Ongoing — COVID-19 pandemic in Chad

- 13 March – The Transitional Military Council of Chad meets with 44 different armed rebel and opposition groups, including the Front for Change and Concord in Chad, Movement for Democracy and Justice in Chad, and the Union of Forces for Democracy and Development in Doha, Qatar for peace talks. The President of Chad, Mahamat Déby, hopes that the talks will be the first step towards agreeing on a new constitution and holding free elections.
- 25 May – Fighting breaks out between Arab and Tama gold miners in the Kouri Bougoudi district of Northern Chad. The rebel Front for Change and Concord in Chad group says that over 200 people have been killed.
- 3 June – Chad declares an emergency over food insecurity in the country. The United Nations estimates that more than a third of the population are in need of urgent humanitarian aid.
- 29 June – Twenty people are found dead in the Libyan Desert, after they went missing fourteen days ago. The group, mainly composed by migrants from Chad, died of thirst.
- 8 August – The government of Chad and more than 30 rebel and opposition factions sign a peace agreement at talks in Doha, Qatar. However, the main rebel group Front for Change and Concord in Chad rejects the agreement, saying that negotiators had not listened to their demands, which included the release of political prisoners.
- 18 August – Timane Erdimi, leader of the Chadian rebel group Rally of Forces for Change and nephew of slain Chadian president Idriss Déby, returns to the country from his 17-year exile in Qatar to participate in a peace process between the government and numerous rebel groups.
- 6 September – 2022 Chad floods – Thousands of people evacuate in N'Djamena, Chad, due to extensive flooding caused by the country's heaviest rains in 30 years. An estimated 442,000 Chadians have been impacted by the floods since the end of August.
- 20 October – 2022 Chadian protests
- 23 November – 2022 Chad attack
