= 2025 in Chad =

- Decades: 2000s; 2010s; 2020s
- See also: Other events of 2025; Timeline of Chadian history

The following events occurred in Chad in the year 2025.

== Incumbents ==
- President: Mahamat Déby
- Prime Minister: Allamaye Halina
- Vice President: vacant

== Events ==
=== January ===
- 8 January – 2025 N'Djamena attack: Eighteen gunmen and one soldier are killed in an attack on the Presidential Palace in N'Djamena.
- 11 January – The French military returns control over its garrison in Abeche to Chad as part of its withdrawal from the country.
- 30 January – The French military returns control over its last remaining garrison in Chad, the Sergent Adji Kossei air base in N’Djamena, as part of its withdrawal from the country.

=== May ===
- 14 May –
  - A plane crash in Zakouma National Park kills an environment official and a foreign pilot on a rhino monitoring flight.
  - Thirty-five people are killed and six wounded in an intercommunal clash in Logone Occidental province, southwest Chad.
- 16 May – Former prime minister Succès Masra is arrested on charges of inciting hatred following clashes in Logone Occidental Region on 14 May that leave 42 people dead.

=== June ===
- 4 June – US President Donald Trump issues a proclamation barring Chadian nationals from entering the United States.
- 5 June – President Deby orders the suspension of visa issuances to US nationals in retaliation for the entry ban on Chadian citizens imposed by the US government.

=== August ===
- 2 August – The burned remains of Fulbert Mouanodji, the former chief of staff for the governor of Ennedi Est, is discovered in Abéché amid allegations of foul play.
- 9 August – Former prime minister Succès Masra is convicted and sentenced to 20 years' imprisonment on charges related to the May clashes in Logone Occidental Region.

=== October ===
- 3 October – The National Assembly of Chad passes a constitutional amendment abolishing term limits for presidents.
- 8 October – The Government terminates its agreement with the conservation charity African Parks, accusing it of failing to curb poaching, and of showing a lack of cooperation with authorities. The decision is reversed on 17 October.

=== November ===
- 5 November – At least 33 people are killed in an intercommunal clash between herders and farmers in the southwest of the country.

=== December ===
- 26 December – Two soldiers are killed after their camp in Tine, Wadi Fira, near the border with Sudan, is attacked by a drone originating from the latter country.

== Holidays ==
- 1 January – New Year's Day
- 8 March – International Women's Day
- 30 March – Eid al-Fitr
- 21 April – Easter Monday
- 1 May – Labour Day
- 6 June – Eid al-Adha
- 11 August – Independence Day
- 4 September – The Prophet's Birthday
- 1 November – All Saints' Day
- 28 November – Republic Day
- 1 December – Freedom and Democracy Day
- 25 December – Christmas Day

== Deaths ==
- 19 June – Aziza Baroud, 59, diplomat and politician, MP (2011–2017).
- 29 November – Madeleine Alingué, 60, politician, Secretary of State for Economic Forecasting and International Partnerships (2022-2024).
- 6 December – Reounodji Gabin, 38, painter and artist.
