= 2017 in Chad =

- Decades: 1990s; 2000s; 2010s; 2020s
- See also: Other events of 2017; Timeline of Chadian history

Events in the year 2017 in Chad.

== Incumbents ==
- President: Idriss Déby

== Events ==
- 9 January: Lawyers of former Chadian President Hissène Habré, who was convicted of crimes against humanity last May and sentenced to life in prison, appeal the verdict, claiming there were irregularities in the trial and question the credibility of some witnesses.
- 27 April: The Extraordinary African Chambers tribunal in Dakar, Senegal, upholds its conviction of former Chadian president Hissène Habré for crimes against humanity, but acquits him of rape.
- 24 September: The White House announces that citizens of Chad will be restricted from travelling to the United States.

== Deaths ==
- 1 December: Abba Siddick, 92, politician and revolutionary.
