= 2018 in Chad =

- Decades: 1990s; 2000s; 2010s; 2020s
- See also: Other events of 2018; Timeline of Chadian history

Events in the year 2018 in Chad.

== Incumbents ==
- President: Idriss Déby

== Events ==
- 11 February: United Kingdom Secretary of State for International Development Penny Mordaunt tells BBC One that Oxfam's failure to pass on information regarding sexual misconduct allegations of its workers in Haiti and Chad shows an "absolute" absence and failure of moral leadership.

== Deaths ==
- 4 September: Joseph Marie Régis Belzile, 87, Canadian-born Chadian Roman Catholic prelate, Bishop of Moundou (1974–1985).
