= 2023 in Chad =

- Decades: 2000s; 2010s; 2020s
- See also: Other events of 2023; Timeline of Chadian history

Events in the year 2023 in Chad.

== Incumbents ==
- President: Mahamat Déby
- Prime Minister: Saleh Kebzabo
- Vice President: Djimadoum Tiraina

== Events ==
Ongoing — COVID-19 pandemic in Chad

- 5 January – The government of Chad reports that an "attempted destabilization" plot led by military and human rights activists has failed. The statement says that the arrests of the 11 people involved took place later than 8 December 2022.
- 4 February – In the east of the country, the JEM fought to stop a force of 2,500 Chadian rebels that were on their way from Sudan to reinforce the troops outside N'Djamena.
- 8 April – Chad expels German ambassador Gordon Kricke after he criticises the government delaying the 2024 election.
- 18 October – The Chadian Minister of Defense Daoud Yaya Brahim and the government's general secretary are sacked after a sex tape is leaked showing the two men having sex with other people.
- 8 November – Chad withdraws their ambassador from Israel, joining eight other countries that have done the same in recent weeks.
- 17 December – 2023 Chadian constitutional referendum: Chadians vote in a referendum on a new constitution.
