= 2021 in Chad =

- Decades: 2000s; 2010s; 2020s
- See also: Other events of 2021; Timeline of Chadian history

Events in the year 2021 in Chad.

== Incumbents ==
- President: Idriss Déby (until April 20)
- Prime Minister: Albert Pahimi Padacké (starting April 26)
- Vice President: Djimadoum Tiraina (starting April 20)

== Events ==
Ongoing — COVID-19 pandemic in Chad

- 6 February – Police in N’Djamena fire tear gas and make several arrests as hundreds set tires on fire and protest against President Déby's nomination to run for a sixth term in April.
- 16 February – Chad deploys 1,200 troops to the ″tri-border region″ of Niger, Mali and Burkina Faso during the G5 Sahel summit.
- 28 February – Opposition leader Yaya Dillo says his mother, son, and three other members of his family were killed in a pre-dawn raid on his house led by the president's son. A government spokesperson said that Dillo had failed to respond to two judicial mandates, and that two people were killed and five injured, including three police officers.
- 3 April – The Niger human rights commission calls for an independent inquiry following alleged rapes, including that of an 11-year-old girl, by Chadian soldiers deployed to help fight armed groups.
- 11 April – The Northern Chad offensive begins, a day after the 2021 Chadian presidential election.
- 19 April – President Idriss Déby wins the 2021 Chadian presidential election for his sixth term.
- 20 April – President Idriss Déby is killed one day after it was announced that he had won the election.
- 24 October – The 2021 Chadian parliamentary election was again delayed until September, 2022.

== Deaths ==
- January 22 – Routouang Yoma Golom, militant and politician, MP (since 2011).
- April 20 – Idriss Déby, politician, president (since 1990)
