= 2016 in Chad =

- Decades: 1990s; 2000s; 2010s; 2020s
- See also: Other events of 2016; Timeline of Chadian history

Events in the year 2016 in Chad.

== Incumbents ==
- President: Idriss Déby

== Events ==
- 13 February: Albert Pahimi Padacké is appointed Prime Minister of Chad, replacing Kalzeubet Pahimi Deubet.
- 10 April: 2016 Chadian presidential election: Voters in Chad go to the polls for the first round of voting in a presidential election with incumbent President Idriss Déby favoured to win a fifth term.
- 21 April: The incumbent President of Chad Idriss Deby is reelected for a fifth term amid allegations of fraud.
- 30 May: Hissene Habre, ex president of Chad, is sentenced to life in prison for ordering rape, sexual slavery and killings during his rule from 1982 to 1990.
- 12 June: Lawyers for former President of Chad Hissène Habré, who was recently found guilty of crimes against humanity and sentenced to life in prison, appeal the verdict. However, a tribunal spokesman said the appeal process is not expected to be done before April 2017.
