= 2024 in Chad =

- Decades: 2000s; 2010s; 2020s
- See also: Other events of 2024; Timeline of Chadian history

Events in the year 2024 in Chad.

== Incumbents ==
- President: Mahamat Déby
- Prime Minister: Saleh Kebzabo (until 1 January); Succès Masra (1 January - 22 May); Allamaye Halina (since 24 May)
- Vice President: Djimadoum Tiraina

== Events ==
=== February ===
- February 28 - The Transitional Military Council (TMC) accuses Socialist Party without Borders (PSF) supporters of attacking Chadian security services headquarters and attempting to assassinate the head of the Supreme Court, Samir Adam Annour. The TMC then cracks down on the PSF and political opponents, killing dozens. PSF leader Yaya Dillo Djérou is reportedly killed during a shootout with security forces at the party's headquarters in N'Djamena.

=== March ===
- March 25 - Seven soldiers are killed in a bomb attack believed to have been orchestrated by Boko Haram near Lake Chad.

=== May ===
- May 6 - 2024 Chadian presidential election: Mahamat Déby wins reelection with 61.3% of the vote, surpassing the required threshold of 50% to avoid a runoff.
- May 22 - Succès Masra submits his resignation as prime minister as well as that of the transitional government.
- May 23 - Mahamat Déby is sworn in as elected president.

=== June ===
- June 18-19 - N'Djamena ammunition depot explosions - Nine people are killed and 46 others are injured following a series of explosions at a military ammunition depot in N'Djamena.
- June 20 - The World Health Organization announces the eradication of sleeping sickness in Chad.

=== July ===
- July 23 - Chad repatriates 157 citizens detained in Libya, with more repatriation flights planned to return all detained Chadians.

=== August ===
- August 16 - At least 54 people are reported killed following days of flooding caused by heavy rains in Tibesti Region.

=== September ===
- September 9 - At least 341 people are reported killed following weeks of flooding nationwide.

=== October ===
- October 28 - At least 40 soldiers are killed in an attack by unidentified gunmen on a military base on the island of Barkaram in Lake Chad.
- 30 October – "Scores" of civilians are killed in an airstrike by the Chadian military on a group of fishermen mistaken to be Boko Haram militants in Tilma island on the Nigerian side of Lake Chad.

=== November ===
- November 9 - Seventeen soldiers are killed in an attack by Boko Haram militants on a military base in the Lake Chad region that also leaves 96 of the attackers dead.
- November 28 - Chad revokes its defence cooperation agreement with France, paving the way for the withdrawal of French troops from the country.

=== December ===
- December 10 - The French military withdraws its two Mirage 2000-D fighter jets stationed in Chad as part of its withdrawal from the country.
- December 26 - The French military returns control over its garrison in Faya-Largeau to Chad as part of its withdrawal from the country.
- December 29 - 2024 Chadian parliamentary election: The ruling Patriotic Salvation Movement wins 124 out of 188 seats in the National Assembly on a voter turnout of 51.5%.
