= 1991 in Chad =

- Decades: 1970s; 1980s; 1990s; 2000s; 2010s
- See also: Other events of 1991; Timeline of Chadian history

The following lists events that happened during 1991 in Chad.

== Incumbents ==
- President: Idriss Déby
- Prime Minister: Jean Alingué Bawoyeu (starting 4 March)
- Vice President: Bada Abbas Maldoum (until February)

== February 28 ==
The Transitional National Charter was approved by the MPS. The Charter consists of a preamble, eight chapters and 51 articles in which the total dismantling of the Habré regime of terror is announced, as well as the creation of a 30-month military Interim Government led by Idriss Déby and the promise of a referendum for the establishment of a new civil constitution once this period has expired.

== March ==
FROLINAT-Fondamental, a more conservative split from FROLINAT formed in 1978, announces its dissolution and joining the MPS.

== March 3 ==
The Mouvement National des Rénovateurs Tchadiens (MNRT), a Libyan-based opposition group led by Ali Muhammad Diallo, accused the Interim Government of being anti-democratic and demanded an immediate referendum.

== July 25-28 ==
The MPS held an extraordinary congress. During the congress, voices were raised denouncing the accumulation of functions of the regime's number two, Bada Abbas Maldoum, who was both Minister of the Interior and vice president of the MPS. At the end of the congress, the position of Vice President of the MPS was abolished. This elimination was negatively received by the Hadjaraï clan and by Maldoum himself.

== October 4 ==
The Council of Ministers signed an order that establishes the conditions for the creation of political parties in Chad, emphasizing above all that all political parties to be established must first renounce tribalism, regionalism and religious sectarianism.

== October 13 ==
Authorities dismantle an alleged coup after rebel soldiers attacked an arsenal near N'Djamena Airport. Déby accuses the still Interior Minister Maldoum of being behind the plot, who will be assassinated along with several supporters. Observers interpreted the coup as a rebellion against the dominance of Deby's Zaghawa ethnic group, but others believe the plot was a false flag to purge Maldoum and isolate the Hadjaraï from power. After these events, Kafine Chadallah, close to Maldoum, will announce rebellion and begin an armed struggle against Déby.
