= 2004 in Chad =

- Decades: 1980s; 1990s; 2000s; 2010s; 2020s
- See also: Other events of 2004; Timeline of Chadian history

This article is a list of events in the year 2004 in Chad.

== Incumbents ==
- President: Idriss Déby
- Prime Minister: Moussa Faki

== Events ==
- August 4: The French Ambassador to Chad, Jean Pierre Bercot, says that France will deploy 200 soldiers to help secure Chad's eastern border with Sudan's conflict-torn Darfur region. The troops will also bring humanitarian aid to tens of thousands of Darfur refugees in Chad.
- September 9: United States Secretary of State Colin Powell declares that the actions of the Janjaweed Arab militia in Darfur constitute genocide. Powell holds the government of Sudan responsible. Up to 50,000 ethnic Africans have been killed and 2.2 million displaced into refugee camps in neighboring Chad by ethnic Arab militias.
- September 22: Experts and officials from Interpol and 19 countries met Tuesday in Burkina Faso to elaborate a strategy to combat terrorism and crime in Africa. Countries participating included Chad.
