= COVID-19 vaccination in Chad =

Plan to immunize against COVID-19

- Date: June 4, 2021
- Cause: COVID-19 pandemic

COVID-19 vaccination in Chad is an ongoing immunisation campaign against severe acute respiratory syndrome coronavirus 2 (SARS-CoV-2), the virus that causes coronavirus disease 2019 (COVID-19), in response to the ongoing pandemic in the country.

Chad began its vaccination program on 4 June 2021, initially after receiving 200,000 doses of the Sinopharm BIBP vaccine donated by China. As of 10 June 2021, 5,324 doses have been administered.

== History ==
=== Timeline ===
==== June 2021 ====
Vaccinations started on 4 June, initially with 200,000 doses of the Sinopharm BIBP vaccine donated by China. By the end of the month 11,390 doses had been administered.

==== July 2021 ====
By the end of the month 26,511 doses had been administered.

==== August 2021 ====
By the end of the month 51,697 doses had been administered.

==== September 2021 ====
By the end of the month 130,369 doses had been administered.

==== October 2021 ====
By the end of the month 224,180 doses had been administered while 1% of the target population had been fully vaccinated.

==== November 2021 ====
By the end of the month 258,618 doses had been administered while 1% of the target population had been fully vaccinated.

==== December 2021 ====
By the end of the month 330,522 doses had been administered while 1% of the target population had been fully vaccinated.

==== January 2022 ====
By the end of the month 392,157 doses had been administered while 2% of the target population had been fully vaccinated.

==== February 2022 ====
By the end of the month 412,309 doses had been administered while 147,640 persons had been fully vaccinated.

==== March 2022 ====
By the end of the month 1,640,446 doses had been administered while 755,755 persons had been fully vaccinated.

==== April 2022 ====
By the end of the month 2,347,168 doses had been administered while 2,087,559 persons had been fully vaccinated.

== Progress ==
Cumulative vaccinations in Chad

View source data.
