= 2020 in Chad =

- Decades: 2000s; 2010s; 2020s
- See also: Other events of 2020; Timeline of Chadian history

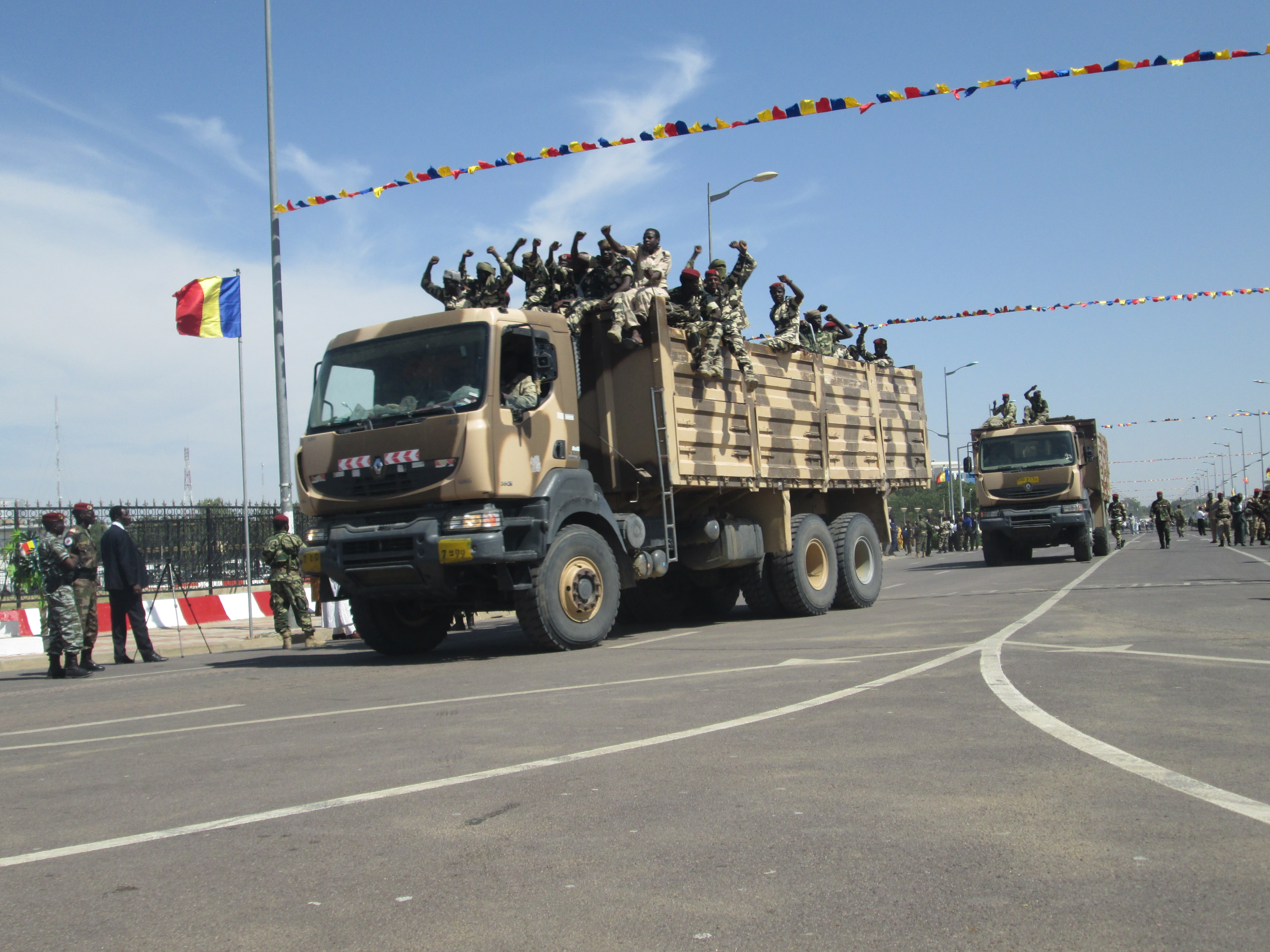
The Chadian Armed Forces, in N'Djamena, on April 13, 2020

== Incumbents ==
- President: Idriss Déby

== Events ==
- March 19 – 1st case of the COVID-19 pandemic in Chad
- March 26 – With three cases already reported, Chadian authorities reported two additional positive cases. The cases were a 48-year-old Chadian and a 55-year-old Cameroonian passenger on a March 17, 2020 Ethiopian Airlines flight from Dubai and Brussels respectively via Addis Ababa.
- March 30 – Two more cases of Covid-19 were reported, a Chadian citizen from Douala and a Swiss citizen from Brussels.
- April 2 – Chad registered a new case of Covid-19. He is a Chadian who traveled from Dubai via Abuja.
- April 3 – A new case of Covid-19 was registered in Chad. He is a French citizen who traveled from Brussels via Paris.
- April 6 – Chad recorded its first case of local contamination. It is a 31 year old Chadian who was in contact with another Chadian diagnosed positive.
- April 9 – Health officials reported a new case of virus infection. He is a 59 year old Chadian who arrived on March 25 in N'Djamena. The man is a religious returning from Pakistan, via Cameroon, having reached N'Djamena by land. The man continued his journey to Abéché where he was finally quarantined on April 4. The test was positive on April 8.
- September 8 – Chad and Israel discuss the possible renewal of diplomatic relations.
- December 24 – Chad adopts its first ever asylum law, enhancing protections for the nearly 480,000 refugees it hosts. It makes Chad one of the first countries in Africa to fulfill a pledge made during the 2019 Global Refugee Forum.

== See also ==
- COVID-19 pandemic in Chad
- COVID-19 pandemic in Africa
- 2020 in Middle Africa
- 2020 in Libya
- 2020 in Niger
- 2020 in Nigeria
- 2020 in Sudan
- 2020 in Cameroon
