= CIA activities in Chad =

Chad is a country in Africa bordering Libya. The Central Intelligence Agency (CIA) is the main intelligence agency of the United States of America. The CIA was active in Chad in the 1980s, due to what the US perceived as a strategic interest in limiting the power of its opponent Muammar Gaddafi, who had ruled Libya since 1969.

== Background ==
Libya invaded Chad in July 1975 in an attempt to drive out Habré, occupying and annexing the Aozou Strip. France and the United States responded by aiding Chad in an attempt to contain Libya's regional ambitions.

On August 29, 1978, Hissène Habré, who was pro-Western, was given the post of prime minister of Chad, replacing Félix Malloum in that position; Malloum had been both prime minister and president since 1975. Habré's term as prime minister ended, however, a year later, when Malloum's government was replaced by that of Goukouni Oueddei, who leaned more towards Libya. On December 15, 1980, Libya occupied all of northern Chad, but Habré defeated Libyan troops and drove them out in November 1981.

== 1981 ==
Human Rights Watch said "the United States helped Habré take power in the first clandestine operation launched by Ronald Reagan's CIA chief, William J. Casey, when he took over the agency in 1981. The purpose, according to Secretary of State Alexander Haig, was to "bloody Khadaffi's nose." The United States later provided Habré with tens of millions of dollars per year in military assistance, even after it became clear that Habré was committing atrocities against his own people."

== 1982 ==
Habré deposed Oueddei on June 7, 1982 and the FAN leader became president; the post of prime minister was abolished. There followed a period of turmoil. Habré created the secret police force, the Directorate of Documentation and Security (DDS) and many opponents of Habré were executed. It also is believed that thousands of people from tribes Habré thought hostile to the regime were killed. It is estimated that Habré's government carried out 40,000 politically motivated killings and over 200,000 cases of torture, leading Human Rights Watch to dub him "Africa's Pinochet."

== 1983 ==
In 1983, Libyan troops occupied all of the country north of Koro Toro. The United States used a clandestine base in Chad to train captured Libyan soldiers whom it was organizing into an anti-Gaddafi force. The US provided military aid and gave support to the DDS, according to The Washington Post.

== 1985 ==
"One newly discovered DDS report reveals that some of Chad's most vicious torturers went on a training mission in 1985 to the United States. Four days after the report, other documents show, several of the trainees were promoted to leadership positions with the DDS."

== 1988 ==
Habré's aid from the US and France helped him to win the war against Gaddafi's Libya. The Libyan occupation of the north of Koro Toro ended when Habré defeated him in 1987. By that time, the war was beginning to end, and had ended by 1988.

According to a Commission of Inquiry set up by Idriss Déby's current Chadian government indicated that the US was supplying Hissein Habré's security forces with means of transport, weapons, clothing and communications equipment, while France, Egypt, Iraq and Zaire were contributing to financing, training and equipping the DDS, with whom they were exchanging intelligence. Again according to the Commission of Inquiry, in 1988 the United States granted the DDS monthly aid of five million CFA francs for its expenditure on fuel and the salaries of its officers. The commission made public a letter dated June 30, 1988 in which the DDS requested the United States Embassy in N'Djaména to double the amount of this aid.

== 1989 ==
"The Commission of Inquiry believes that this request was probably met in 1989. According to the Commission, US advisers went regularly to the office of the director of the DDS, either to give advice or to exchange intelligence, and it seems reasonable to believe that they were aware of the torture of prisoners held at the DDS, particularly since the DDS premises were right next to the USAID building, from where it would have been possible to hear the screams of torture victims. The DDS was also part of a network known as "Mosaïque", Mosaic, made up of the security services of the Côte d'Ivoire, Israel, Chad, Togo, the Central African Republic, Zaire and Cameroon. The aim of Mosaïque, which was financed by the United States, was to facilitate exchanges of intelligence, the implementation of joint operations and surveillance of opponents to governments (in particular through extradition).

"Chad has been a major beneficiary of US military assistance in Africa. This support was maintained and even increased throughout the Habré administration. Assistance was given principally through the International Military Education and Training Program (IMET) and the Military Assistance Program (MAP). The aims of this military assistance were set out in a document presented to the US Congress in 1987:

"The objectives of the proposed IMET program are: to help the Chadian military develop the systems and operational and maintenance expertise needed for effective management, to encourage an indigenous training capability, and to promote a better understanding of the U.S. and demonstrate out commitment to democratic principles and human rights

"In 1998, Congress was informed that the US authorities had "provided $25 million in emergency military equipment and services under section 506(a) of the Foreign Assistance Act. Additional emergency aid was authorised in 1986 and 1987. These emergency funds and our MAP (Military Assistance Program) have enabled provision of three C-130A aircraft, ammunition, Redeye missiles, grenade launchers, rifles, four-wheel drive vehicles and support for previously acquired U.S. equipment." The same document estimated that in 1983, 1984, 1985 and 1986 respectively, seven, 11, four and six million US dollars had been spent on "military deliveries".

"None of the documents presented to Congress and consulted by Amnesty International covering the period from 1984 to 1989 make any reference to human rights violations.

== 1990 ==
Despite this victory, Habré's government was weak, and strongly opposed by members of the Zaghawa ethnic group. On December 1, 1990, he was deposed by Idriss Déby, a Zaghawa and one of his former generals, with support from Libya. Habré went into exile in Senegal, and Déby became president of Chad.

== See also ==
- CIA activities by country
- CIA activities in Libya
