= 2010 in Chad =

- Decades: 1990s; 2000s; 2010s; 2020s
- See also: Other events of 2010; Timeline of Chadian history

Events in the year 2010 in Chad.

== Incumbents ==
- President: Idriss Déby
- Prime Minister: Youssouf Saleh Abbas (until March 5th), Emmanuel Nadingar (from March 5th onwards)

== Events ==
=== January ===
- January 15 – The Chadian Civil War (2005–2010) ends.

=== May ===
- May 14 – Chad gives The United Nations International Atomic Energy Agency (IAEA) access to information about its nuclear programs and involvements.
- May 26 – UN peacekeeping forces agree to pull out of Chad by the end of the year.

=== July ===
- July 21 – Chadian government refuses to arrest Sudanese president, Omar al-Bashir, despite being legally obligated to arrest the figure with a warrant out for his arrest.
- July-September – Flooding in Chad causes 70,000 people to be displaced from their homes.

=== November ===
- Chad continues to struggle against a Cholera outbreak, hitting 5,000 total recorded cases in the country.
