= 2009 in Chad =

- Decades: 1980s; 1990s; 2000s; 2010s; 2020s
- See also: Other events of 2009; Timeline of Chadian history

Events in the year 2009 in Chad.

In general, the year was mostly one with rampant negative issues regarding political instability and other undesirable conditions of a country.

== Incumbents ==
- President: Idriss Déby
- Prime Minister: Youssouf Saleh Abbas

Déby and Abbas were incumbent throughout the year following the 2006 Chadian presidential election, in which Déby had won a majority of the votes.

== Events ==
=== May ===
- May 9 - Chad captures 150 rebels near Am-Dam after having crossed over the eastern border with Sudan. This was a single event in part of a larger conflict.
- May 15 - Sudan accused Chad for two air bombardments in its territory done by the Chadian government to attack Chadian rebel groups' bases in Sudan.

=== October ===
- October 9 - Activists voiced concerns with Chadian government over oil pipeline backed by the China National Petroleum Corporation (CNPC) over environmental and human displacement concerns.
- October 15 - The Food and Agriculture Organization declared a humanitarian disaster within the country as Lake Chad continued to shrink, increasing water scarcity for many residents.
