= 2008 in Chad =

- Decades: 1980s; 1990s; 2000s; 2010s; 2020s
- See also: Other events of 2008; Timeline of Chadian history

The following details notable events from the year 2008 in Chad. Chad is a landlocked country in Central Africa. It is bordered by Libya to the north, Sudan to the east, the Central African Republic to the south, Cameroon and Nigeria to the southwest, and Niger to the west.

== Incumbents ==
- President: Idriss Déby
- Prime Minister: Delwa Kassiré Koumakoye (until April 15), Youssouf Saleh Abbas (starting April 15)

== Events ==
=== January ===
- January 7 – A journalist from the independent FM Liberté radio station is harassed by the security forces and allegedly intimated to drop coverage of an issue.
- January 16 – The FM Liberté radio station is closed down by the government and its director Djekourninga Kaoutar Lazar arrested and interrogated.
- January 17 – Keletété Dono, head of the Liberal Party of Chad (Parti Libéral du Tchad or PLT) is arrested without warrant, but was released shortly after. He had left a week before to FM Liberté an interview critical of the government.
- January 18 – The director of radio FM Liberté is released, but charged with defamation and incitement to tribal hatred.
- January 21 – The state prosecutor drops all charges against radio FM Liberté director Lazar.

=== February ===
- February 11 – EU spokesman announces that the deployment of the EUFOR Tchad/RCA, delayed by the fighting in N'Djamena, is to be resumed. Currently there are only 150 EUFOR troops in Chad.

=== March ===
- March 13 – With the mediation of the Senegalese President Abdoulaye Wade, the Sudanese President Omar al-Bashir and Chadian President Idriss Déby sign in Dakar a non-aggression pact. By the terms of the accord, both accept to "inhibit all activities of armed groups".
- March 14 – A spokesman for the rebel National Alliance (AN) declares they will ignore the peace accord among Chad and Sudan and continue to fight Déby if he doesn't accept to start serious talks with them.
- March 14 – 83 of the 103 children who were at the centre of the Zoé's Ark controversy, who have been kept in an orphanage in Abéché since the eruption of the scandal five months ago, are reunited to their families.
- March 20 – The commander in chief of the EUFOR Tchad/RCA, Pat Nash, states the troops would answer fire if the rebels will attack the refugee camps protected by the EUFOR.

=== May ===
- May 10 – Sudan cuts ties with Chad, claiming the country to be behind an attack by Darfur rebels.

=== June ===
- June 13 – Rebels advance towards N'Djamena and threatens to target French aircraft flying over their territory.
- June 13/14 – Irish troops are fired upon during a clash between the Chadian government and rebels.

=== August ===
- August 15 – Former president Hissene Habre, along with 11 rebels, is sentenced to death for crimes against the state.

=== September ===
- September 11 – The World Bank cancels plans they had in agreement with Chad for an oil pipeline in the country.
