= Mamari Djimé Ngakinar =

Chad military colonel and politician

Mamari Djimé Ngakinar is a Chad politician and Colonel. He served as Vice President of Chad from April 1975 to August 1978.

Djimé was born on 29 March 1934 in Abéché. He joined French Army in 1952. He was appointed as Vice President of Chad in April 1975 following the 1975 coup d'état. He also held the post of minister of interior and security from 1975 to 1976. In 1978 Djimé joined the national unity government led by Félix Malloum and Hissène Habré as minister of national defense. He went into exile in France when Hissène Habré seized power. He returned to Chad in 1986.

Djimé died in on 9 September 2019 in Ermont, France.
