= Bada Abbas Maldoum =

Chadian politician

Vice President of Chad
- In office December 1990 – February 1991
- President: Idriss Déby
- Preceded by: Wadel Abdelkader Kamougué
- Succeeded by: Djimadoum Tiraina

Interior Minister
- In office 1991–1991

Minister of Justice
- In office 1995–1996

Bada Abbas Maldoum (1952-2006) was a politician from Chad who served as Vice President of Chad from December 1990 to February 1991. He has also served as Minister of Justice from 1995 to 1996 and served as Interior minister of Chad in 1991.

He died in 2006.
