= 2013 in Chad =

- Decades: 1990s; 2000s; 2010s; 2020s
- See also: Other events of 2013; Timeline of Chadian history

Events in the year 2013 in Chad.

== Incumbents ==
- President: Idriss Déby
- Prime Minister: Emmanuel Nadingar (until January 21), Djimrangar Dadnadji (from January 21st onwards)

== Events ==
=== January ===
- January 21 – The Health Minister of Chad announces that 38 children have been hospitalized after getting vaccinated against Meningitis.

=== March ===
- March 2 – The Chadian army claims to have killed Mokhtar Belmokhtar, responsible for a terrorist enacted hostage situation in Algeria. The claims would go on to be disproven.
- March 14 – Poachers in Ganba, in Southern Chad, slaughter 89 elephants.

=== April ===
- April 15 – President Déby announces that Chad will be pulling troops out of Mali.

=== May ===
- May 2 – 4 People are killed in N'Djamena due to a plot conspiracy to destabilize the government, which was labelled a coup.

=== June ===
- June 14 – The UNHRC relocates 7,000 refugees to escape emerging brutal conditions of the wet season.
- June 26 – Chad catches poachers responsible for the poaching of 89 elephants earlier in March.

=== July ===
- July 2 – Former president Hissène Habré is charged with crimes against humanity, war crimes, and torture by Senegal.
- July 26 – The Global Fund grants Chad over $28 million to help secure access to mosquito nets in the country to combat Malaria.

=== October ===
- October 31 – The government of Chad signs an agreement to end the use of child soldiers by the army and security forces of the country.

=== November ===
- November 25 – The head of UNAMID meets President Déby to promote processes towards peace in Darfur.

=== December ===
- Human Rights Watch releases a report depicting the atrocities of the Chadian government under the administration of former president Hissène Habré.
