= 2012 in Chad =

- Decades: 1990s; 2000s; 2010s; 2020s
- See also: Other events of 2012; Timeline of Chadian history

Events in the year 2012 in Chad.

== Incumbents ==
- President: Idriss Déby
- Prime Minister: Emmanuel Nadingar

== Events ==
=== January ===
- January 11 – Senegal denies Chad's request to extradite former dictator Hissène Habré to Belgium for sentencing.

=== May ===
- May 17 – The World Bank approves $34 million to boost food production in the agricultural and livestock sectors of the Chadian economy.

=== July ===
- July 24 – Dozens of elephants are slaughtered by poachers in southwestern Chad.

=== August ===
- August 3 – President Déby sends troops to find and capture poachers following the previous month's poaching incident.

=== October ===
- October 12 – The United Nations Human Rights Council begins to move refugees from the Central African Republic from Chad to new sites after floods.
