= 2005 in Chad =

- Decades: 1980s; 1990s; 2000s; 2010s; 2020s
- See also: Other events of 2005; Timeline of Chadian history

This article is a list of events in the year 2005 in Chad.

== Incumbents ==
- President: Idriss Déby
- Prime Minister: Moussa Faki (until February 3), Pascal Yoadimnadji (from February 3)

== Events ==
=== January ===
- January 28 - An outbreak of meningitis occurs in a community of refugees from Darfur.

=== April ===
- April 29 - Chad joins the Arab League as an observer state.

=== August ===
- August 12 - 6 of Hissène Habré's close government connections are removed from their positions in the government.
- August 19 - 4,000 refugees from the Central African Republic enter chad, fleeing from violence.

=== September ===
- September 27 - 2005 Chad attacks: 46 people are killed in clashes between Sudanese fighters and the Chadian government.

=== December ===
- December 23 - President Déby claims that his country is in a state of war with Sudan following rebel attacks.
