= 2007 in Chad =

- Decades: 1980s; 1990s; 2000s; 2010s; 2020s
- See also: Other events of 2007; Timeline of Chadian history

Events from the year 2007 in Chad.

== Incumbents ==
- President: Idriss Déby
- Prime Minister:
  - until 23 February: Pascal Yoadimnadji
  - 23 February-26 February: Adoum Younousmi
  - starting 26 February: Delwa Kassiré Koumakoye

== Events ==
=== January ===
- January 3 - During a demonstration in the capital led by wounded soldiers demanding better medical care, the security forces open fire on the demonstrators killing at least one person.
- January 5 - During a visit to Chad by the Chinese Foreign Minister Li Zhaoxing, the People's Republic of China and Chad sign a series of loan, debt relief and economic cooperation accords worth $80 million, of which $32 million in debt relief and $26 as a debt loan.
- January 6 - President Idriss Déby was present at the ceremony in which 200 rebels joined the army in Goz Beida, which stemmed from a ceasefire among government and rebels signed on December 24, 2006.
- January 10 - The United Nations Security Council decides following a meeting on the ongoing conflicts in Chad, Darfur and the Central African Republic to send a new technical assessment mission to Chad and the Central African Republic so to establish the chances of deploying a UN peace mission there.
- January 13 - Mahamat Nouri's Union of Forces for Democracy and Development (UFDD) rebels occupy briefly the town of Ounianga Kébir in the BET Region.
- January 15 - Chad lodges a formal protest to Sudan, complaining that the Sudanese Air Force flew over army's positions in eastern Chad.
- January 17 - The rebel militias Rally of Democratic Forces (RAFD) and UFDD capture, following a joint attack, the town of Ade in Ouaddaï Region.
- January 24 - The Air West Flight 612 flying from Khartoum to El Fasher is hijacked by a lone gunman and diverted to N'Djamena, where the hijacker surrenders.
- January 24 - Following aerial attacks the Chadian army retakes Ade.
- January 28 - Ethnic Zaghawa militias raid in Dar Tama a group of Tama villages between Am Zoer and Biltine, killing seven Tama and burning 200 homes.
- January 29 - A unit of United Front for Democratic Change (FUC) Tama militia members (which has recently made peace with the Chadian government) is ambushed by Zaghawa SCUD rebels southeast of Guéréda, causing the death of 20 civilians and 31 FUC militia members.
- January 31 - Security forces members arrest Marcel Ngargoto, secretary-general of the human rights organization Association des Droits de l'Homme sans Frontières (DHSF) and a journalist for the community radio station Radio Brokass. He is accused of "ruthless handling of sensitive news which could harm national cohesion" for having criticized the Moissala police chief.

=== February ===
- February 1 - UFDD rebels attack violently Adré in Ouaddaï but were unable to take the town. At least a dozen civilians are reported killed, and about 40 wounded.
- February 15 - Aid agency Oxfam intervenes warning that Chad may become "another Darfur" if measures are not taken to contain the ethnic conflict in the country.
- February 16 - The United Nations High Commissioner for Refugees releases a statement in which it warns that a new genocide on the scale of that in Rwanda in 1994 may take place in Chad, where killing tactics similar to those in Darfur have already been established.
- February 21 - UN Secretary-General Ban Ki-moon puts before the Security Council two alternative plans for the deployment in Chad and the Central African Republic either 6,000 or 11,000 peacekeeping troops.
- February 21 - In Tripoli, under Libyan pressure Chadian and Sudanese Presidents agree to increase efforts to end violence spilling over the border from Darfur.
- February 23 - Following the death of Pascal Yoadimnadji, Infrastructure Minister Adoum Younousmi assumes the interim as Prime Minister of Chad.
- February 28 - The Chadian government announces it will not accept a peacekeeping force on its territory and will only accept a civilian police.

=== March ===
- March 5 - former FUC insurgent leader Mohammed Nour Abdelkerim is nominated Defence Minister.
- March 22 - The UNHCR warns that an estimated 36,000 Chadians have fled the war in Chad by searching refuge in Darfur, despite the humanitarian crisis there.
- March 22 - The Chadian government accuses the Sudanese Air Force of bombing the towns of Tenay and Bahaï, an area where Darfur rebels are known to operate.
- March 31 - The government accuses Sudanese Janjaweed of attacking the villages of Tiero and Marena in eastern Chad, killing hundreds and displacing 9,000 civilians, in what the UNHCR judges the worst attacks in the region it the last six months.

=== April ===
- April 6 - In retaliation to the attack on Tiero and Marena Chadian forces supported by helicopters, attacking rebel positions close to the Sudanese border.
- April 9 - Chadian troops clash with Sudanese forces inside Darfur, whose violence was called by UNHCR official in the area "apocalyptic".
- April 13 - The former Chadian President Goukouni Oueddei is received in Libreville by the Gabonese President Omar Bongo, pleading the latter to act as a mediator in the Chadian crisis.
- April 14 - Following the Chadian-Sudanese army clash in Sudan, Chadian Foreign Minister Ahmad Allam-Mi meets Sudanese President Omar al-Bashir in an attempt to defuse tensions, but he also insists that the Sudanese government is supporting Chadian rebels and the Janjaweed.
- April 17 - In a meeting held in Libreville, Gabon, former Chadian President Goukouni Oueddei sees Idriss Déby and offers his disponibility to meet the rebels and act as a mediator.

=== May ===
- May 2 - Chad's 32,000 civil servants begin a months-long strike affecting schools and hospitals, and asking the government to increase their wage through the use of the oil revenues.
- May 3 - The Chadian and Sudanese presidents sign an accord in Saudi Arabia to not support each other's rebels and to create a joint border force, collaborating with the United Nations' plan to deploy 11,000 men in eastern Chad so to stabilise the region.
- May 9 - The Chadian government signs an accord with UNICEF for the demobilisation of child soldiers from its armed forces.
- May 19 - Journalist and human rights activist Marcel Ngargoto is released from detention, in which he has been since January 31, after having subjected himself to a hunger strike.
- May 25 - Chadian government raises the state of emergency proclaimed six months earlier.
- May 25 - Following an aggression against its personnel in Iriba, the United Nations World Food Programme suspends operations in the area of the attack.
- May 31 - The government offers a 15% wage increase to put an end to the civil service strike began on May 2, but the offer is declined as judged insufficient by union leaders.

=== June ===
- June 5 - Chadian Prime Minister Delwa Kassiré Koumakoye rejects the French idea of creating a humanitarian corridor across Chadian territory to bring aid to Darfur.
- June 8 - Aid organisation Médecins Sans Frontières (MSF), which has undertaken a survey among internally displaced Chadians, reports in a press release that four children under five are dying per 10,000 every day, double the rate that signals an emergency according to WHO thresholds.
- June 9 - President Idriss Déby opens to the possibility of a military international force in Chad, which he had previously resisted.
- June 23 - A Chadian government delegation led by the interim Prime Minister Adoum Younousmi and the main rebel groups meet in Tripoli so to start to a series of peace talks sponsored by the Libyan leader Muammar al-Gaddafi.

=== July ===
- July 2 - A spokesman for the rebel Union of Forces for Democracy and Development (UFDD), announces that if the talks being kept in Libya failed, there would be a return to all-out war.
- July 20 - The Chadian government dissolves a committee that managed a share of oil income, claiming mismanagement and corruption. The committee was encharged with allocating 5% of the countries annual oil revenues to local communities in the oil-extraction region.
- July 23 - European Union foreign ministers in a joint meeting give instructions to their military staffs to draw up plans for an operation to deploy EU troops in Chad and the Central African Republic, as part UN peacekeeping force. France is expected to play a dominant role in this EU force.
- July 30 - Following Gabonese mediation President Déby meets in the capital with a group of opposition leaders in exile, led by Goukouni Oueddei but including also Fidèle Moungar, Ahmat Yacoub, Adoum Togoï and Antoine Bangui.

=== August ===
- August 9 - Lake Léré, due to heavy rains, overflows flooding homes in dozens of surrounding villages, with people being carried away by the waters.
- August 10 - UN Secretary-General Ban Ki-moon proposes a plan for the deployment of UN peacekeeping troops in eastern Chad with the primary objective of protecting civilians.
- August 13 - The Chadian government and the opposition sign an accord postponing legislative elections to 2009 and on sharing power up to that date.
- August 22 - New tribal clashes among Zaghawa and Tama in Dar Tama cause the death of eleven Tama and one Zaghawa.
- August 23 - Chadian Foreign Minister Ahmad Allam-Mi protested with the Central African Republic government for the killing of four Chadian civilians by a CAR soldier.
- August 26 - As a measure to contain the serious flood damage caused by the heavy rains the government has promised to provide US$623,000 for the Chadians displaced in the Mayo-Kebbi Ouest.
- August 27 - Pending arbitration by the International Trade Union Confederation, Chadian Union leaders suspend a strike by the country's civil servants which has disrupted public schools and hospitals since its beginning in May.

=== September ===
- September 6 - The World Food Programme (WFP) launches an appeal for US$81 million so to be able to feed Darfur refugees and internally displaced persons in eastern Chad.
- September 12 - Armed men allegedly working for the security forces detain Al Jazeera correspondent Fadoul Beneye.
- September 14 - A leader of Timane Erdimi's Rassemblement des Forces du Changement (RFC) warns that EU troops (expected as part of the future peacekeeping force) will be attacked if they won't remain neutral.
- September 20 - In his first visit in the country since the reestablishment of diplomatic relations between the two countries in 2006, Idriss Déby arrives in the People's Republic of China to meet top Chinese officials, included President Hu Jintao.

=== October ===
- October 4 - The Déby government and the four main Chadian armed groups sign an accord in Libya, which in exchange for a ceasefire promises a government posts. The accord opens the road for the deployment in eastern Chad of an international peace contingent.
- October 8 - The Chadian government and three exiled opposition parties (Younous Ibedou Awad's Alliance of Resistant Democrats (ADR), Chadian Democratic Rally (RDT) and the Union of the Chadian People for National Reconstruction (UPTRN)) sign in Cotonou in Benin, including an amnesty and the full participation of the opposition to the political life.
- October 10 - An estimated 1,000 former FUC fighters located in Dar Tama, amid voices that they were going to be disarmed, desert the government and move towards the Chadian-Sudanese border.
- October 12 - United States evangelical missionary Steve Goldbold is kidnapped by MDJT rebels in the Tibesti region. The MDJT leader Aboubakar Choua Dazi accuses Goldbold to be "in the service of the regime in N'Djamena to create division in the center of the movement".

=== November ===
- November 30 - Four army officers, the sultan and the governor of Dar Tama, and one additional individual are arrested in Guéréda. The governor is a member of the FUC, while the sultan is accused of sympathising with the rebels.

=== December ===
- December 14 - Nadjikimo Benoudjita, managing editor of the small weekly newspaper Notre Temps, is arrested without warrant. While in custody it was announced that the Notre Temps was to be considered "purely and simply shut down".
- December 17 - The journalist Nadjikimo Benoudjita is charged with "incitement to tribal and religious hatred" and released on bail.

== Deaths ==
- January 30 - Koibla Djimasta, National Mediator and former Prime Minister, dies.
- February 23 - Pascal Yoadimnadji, Prime Minister of Chad, dies in Paris aged 57 from a brain haemorrhage.
- May 4 - General Noël Milarew Odingar, protagonist of the Chadian coup of 1975, dies in Paris.
- July 2 - Brahim Déby, 27-year-old son of the Chadian President Idriss Déby, is assassinated in Paris.
