= 2011 in Chad =

- Decades: 1990s; 2000s; 2010s; 2020s
- See also: Other events of 2011; Timeline of Chadian history

Events in the year 2011 in Chad.

== Incumbents ==
- President: Idriss Déby
- Prime Minister: Emmanuel Nadingar

== Events ==
=== April ===
- April – Thousands of Chadians that fled to Libya during the Civil War return to their native country.

=== July ===
- 9–22 July – Chadian government asks that Senegal follow through on sending former president Hissène Habré to Belgium to be prosecuted and sentenced for crimes against humanity during his term as president.

=== August ===
- Cholera continues to ravage the populations of Chad, as well as other countries neighboring Lake Chad.

=== November ===
- The Global Environment Facility grants Chad and neighboring countries $20 million to help encourage sustainable practices regarding energy and natural resources.

=== December ===
- December 6 – The Food and Agriculture Organization establish a program to help alleviate hunger in Chad.
- December 8 – The government of Chad works to build counters to child trafficking within the country.
- December 13 – The International Criminal Court announces that Chad has not met its obligations as a member by failing to arrest Omar al-Bashir in August of the previous year.
