= 1992 in Chad =

- Decades: 1970s; 1980s; 1990s; 2000s; 2010s
- See also: Other events of 1992; Timeline of Chadian history

The following events happened in Chad in the year 1992.

== Incumbents ==
- President: Idriss Déby
- Prime Minister: Jean Alingué Bawoyeu (until 20 May)
  Joseph Yodoyman

== January 3 ==
A rebel coalition loyal to Hissène Habré, consisting of the Forces Armees Occidentales (FAO), the Mouvement pour la Démocratie et le Développement (MDD), and the Movement for Development and Democracy (MDD), launched an invasion from Nigeria. The rebels advanced through the region east of Lake Chad and captured Bol and Liwa. Officials said the rebels were led by Goukoni Get and numbered at least 3,000 fighters. In Paris, the Foreign Ministry announced the dispatch of some 300 paratroopers to Chad to support the government.

== January 31 ==
A soldier is lynched to death after stealing a motorcycle. In retaliation, the military forces killed 5 civilians. This incident triggered riots in which at least twenty people died.

== February 16 ==
Joseph Behidi, a popular southern leader and vice-president of the Chadian Human Rights League, is killed in N'djamena after being shot by two soldiers while driving from his home to a nightclub. This incident provoked great anger among the southerners and numerous defections, including that of Lieutenant Kétte Nodji Moïse, who established the Committee for Action for Peace and Democracy (CSNDP).

== March 16 ==
The government authorized the creation of two new legal political parties: the Rally for Democracy and Progress (RDP), led by Lol Mahamat Choua, and the Democratic Union for Progress in Chad (UPDT), led by Elie Romba.

== April 10 ==
The armed rebel group MDD claimed that at least 40 political opponents and rebel leaders exiled in Nigeria had been abducted and illegally repatriated to Chad since February. Among those abducted were rebel leaders Goukouni Guet and Ahmed Saker Bidon. It later emerged that both had been tortured and extrajudicially executed.

== April 20 ==
The CSNDP attacks and captures the Doba garrison. This incident triggers intense fighting between the CSNDP and government forces, which spreads throughout Lagone Oriental and results in a large number of civilian deaths, especially at the hands of government reprisals against sympathizers and suspected sympathizers.

== May 20-22 ==
Joseph Yodoyman is appointed Prime Minister by presidential decree, succeeding Jean Alingué Bawoyeu in office. Two days later, a new cabinet including several opposition members is announced.
