= Armed Forces for a Federal Republic =

1990s rebel group in Chad

Armed Forces for a Federal Republic (FARF) were a rebel group in Chad in the 1990s.
