= Reounodji Gabin =

Chadian artist (1987–2025)

- Born: 13 February 1987; Bénoye, Chad
- Died: 6 December 2025 (aged 38); N'Djamena, Chad
- Known for: Utilizing recycled plastics in art

Reounodji Gabin (13 February 1987 – 6 December 2025), better known as Gabin Art, was a Chadian painter and artist.

== Life and career ==
Gabin was born in Bénoye on 13 February 1987. He was known for his art utilizing recycled plastics. Throughout his career, he trained with artists such as Ali Bouba and Diallo Art. In 2019, he organized his first major exhibition at the centenary roundabout in N'Djamena, an event hailed for its originality and impact.

In 2022, he was invited to Saint Moritz, Switzerland for an exhibition as part of an artistic residency. In 2024, he signed a work entitled "Kelou and Mona Lisa", mixing his universe with that of Leonardo da Vinci's Mona Lisa.

Gabin died in a traffic collision in Toukra, in the 9th district of N'Djamena, on 6 December 2025. He was 38.
