= CIA activities in Libya =

US intelligence operations

The Central Intelligence Agency have performed multiple surveillance activities in Libya, particularly following the 1969 Libyan coup d'état. These surveillance activities had a particular focus on US oil interests in the region, but quickly focused on the governance of Muammar Gaddafi and his hostility toward the United States. During the First Libyan Civil War, the CIA's focus turned to the Libyan Rebels, of whom would eventually overthrow Gaddafi.

== 1969 ==
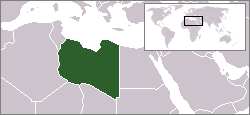
Libya location.

Focused on the next six months after the coup that overthrew the monarchy, conclusions estimated: "likely developments in Libyan policy, particularly with regard to issues affecting US interests.

"The young captains and lieutenants who took over Libya four months ago want foreign military installations removed from Libya as soon as possible. Evacuation of the bases in a manner satisfactory to the Libyans will not guarantee good relations between Libya and the US, but any other outcome would seriously prejudice US interests. The members of the Revolutionary Command Council (RCC) are also clearly determined to identify with the militant Arab line toward Israel. In these two desires, they reflect the prevailing mood in Libya itself, and any successor regime probably would follow similar policies.

"Beyond this, we know little concerning the policies of the RCC, and there seem to be potential sources of dissension within the group. Unsure of its own hold on power and lacking clear domestic policy objectives, it will be disposed to look for advice to other Arab countries--especially Egypt, with which the RCC leaders are developing close ties.

Flag of Libya (1977–2011)

Oil operations in Libya netted the US balance of payments over $800 million in 1968... The RCC will press vigorously, and successfully, to increase its income from oil. Nationalization of oil production does not seem likely, but it cannot be entirely ruled out, in dealing with the oil companies, Libya holds a number of high cards.

The RCC probably will contribute financially to the Arab cause even more heavily than did the monarchy. It also may station token contingents of troops in Egypt and perhaps Jordan. If Egypt so desired, the RCC probably would agree to make Libyan airfields available to Egyptian aircraft. Over the longer run, it is possible that Soviet-manned reconnaissance aircraft in some guise might be permitted access to facilities in Libya. The circumstances under which such a contingency might arise will be more fully explored in NIE 11-6-70, "Soviet Policies in the Mediterranean Basin," scheduled for publication in the first quarter of 1970 Properly requested and conducted over flights and port visits by the Soviets would almost certainly be permitted; we doubt, however, that the Libyans would give the USSR access to military installations in Libya on anything like extraterritorial terms. See the NIE for additional detail.

== 1981 ==
A global finding in 1981 orders CIA to take action against Muammar Gaddafi, who is thought to be distributing weapons to terrorists throughout Europe and Africa.

== War on terror ==
In 2003, Libya normalised relations with the west due to nuclear nonproliferation. The CIA and MI6 cooperated with the regime which became a partner in the war on terror. This included renditions of Libyan dissidents back to Gaddafi’s regime, where they were often tortured. This was exposed from documents found in Tripoli during the 2011 Libyan Revolution.

== 2005 ==
=== Intelligence analysis ===
In his Senate Intelligence Committee statement, Porter Goss described the status of Libya as a success story in nonproliferation Goss said that Libya, by the end of 2004, had taken a number of significant steps it had promised:

- Dismantling key elements of its nuclear weapons program and opened itself to the IAEA.
- Giving up some key chemical warfare assets and opened its former CW program to international scrutiny.
- After disclosing its Scud stockpile and extensive ballistic and cruise missile R&D efforts in 2003, Libya took important steps to abide by its commitment to limit its missiles to the 300-km range threshold of the Missile Technology Control Regime (MTCR).

The US continued to work with Libya to clarify some discrepancies in the declaration.

== Libyan civil war ==
Flag of Libya (2011 protests).

After the Arab Spring movement overthrew the rulers of Tunisia and Egypt, its neighbours to the west and east respectively, Libya had a major revolt beginning in February 2011. In response, the Obama administration sent in CIA Special Activities Division paramilitary operatives to assess the situation and gather information on the opposition forces.

During the early phases of the Libyan air strike offensive, paramilitary operatives assisted in the recovery of a U.S. Air Force pilot who had crashed due to mechanical problems. There was also speculation in The Washington Post that President Obama issued a covert action finding in March 2011 that authorized the CIA to carry out a clandestine effort to provide arms and support to the Libyan opposition.

== See also ==
- CIA activities by country
