= Madeleine Alingué =

Chadian politician (1965–2025)

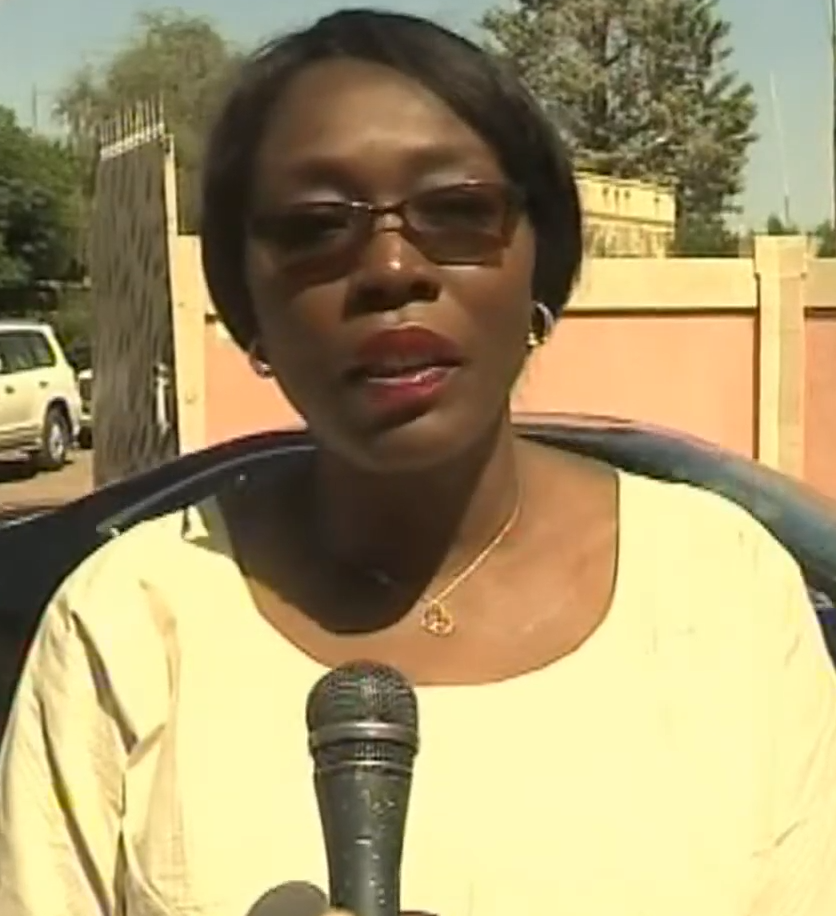
- Born: 11 September 1965 (age 60)
- Citizenship: Chad
- Education: Professor of international relations at university Externado de colombie
- Occupation: Female politician
- Known for: Former prime minister of chad
- Parent: Jean Alingué Bawoyeu

Madeleine Andebeng Labeau Alingué (11 September 1965 – 29 November 2025) was a Chadian politician.

== Life and career ==
Alingué was born on 11 September 1965. She was the daughter of former prime minister Jean Alingué Bawoyeu.

Following studying in Paris and China, she became a professor of international relations at University Externado de Colombie. During her life in Colombia she worked for the diplomatic relationships of the global south, creating the Panafrican Alliance Kony, developing sociopolitical and cultural agreements between Africa and Latin America.

In 2010, she returned to Chad where she joined the Office of International Migration (l'Office des migrations internationales). In 2014, she was named the secretary of state of foreign affairs. In 2015, she was the advisor to the permanent mission of Chad with the United Nations Security Council in New York. She acted for a few months, in 2016 with the Chief of State, Idriss Déby, as the deputy director of the Cabinet.

On 14 August 2016, she was named the minister of communication and took the role of government spokeswoman. It was the first time that this post was filled by a woman in Chad. She spoke seven languages; spanish, english, french, chinese, arabic and two originary african languages from Tchad.

Under the constitution of the Fourth Republic, she had to take an oath by swearing to Allah in 2018. She refused and swore in the name of God, which led to her suspension before the president of the Supreme Court reversed this decision after the intervention of President Idriss Déby.

She was the minister of tourism development, culture, and handcrafts until July 2020.

From 14 October 2022 to 2 January 2024, she was the secretary of state for economy, development planning, and international cooperation in the national union government led by Saleh Kebzabo.

Alingué died in Paris on 29 November 2025, at the age of 60.
