= 2006 in Chad =

- Decades: 1980s; 1990s; 2000s; 2010s; 2020s
- See also: Other events of 2006; Timeline of Chadian history

This article is a list of events in the year 2006 in Chad.

== Incumbents ==
- President: Idriss Déby
- Prime Minister: Pascal Yoadimnadji

== Events ==
=== January ===
- January 27 - More than 2,000 total refugees flee from the Central African Republic into Chad's southern border, fleeing factional violence in their home country.

=== April ===
- April 12 - The Chadian government sends soldiers to the capital, N'Djamena to secure it against the incoming threat of rebels.
- April 14 - Peace Corps temporarily suspends their participation in Chad under worry of safety of volunteers within the country due to instability and rebel fighting.
- April 18 - UN Secretary General Kofi Annan warns that violence from Chad could spread to neighboring Central African countries.

=== August ===
- August 26 - President Déby forces oil companies Chevron and Petronas out of the country, citing that neither company had not paid taxes to the country.

=== September ===
- September 4 - Mike Fay of National Geographic uncovers that poachers had killed 100 dead elephants near a preserve in Northern Chad.
