= Routouang Yoma Golom =

Chadian militant and politician (died 2021)

Member of the Chadian National Assembly
- In office 23 June 2011 – 22 January 2021

Personal details
- Died: 22 January 2021 N'Djamena, Chad
- Party: MPS

Routouang Yoma Golom (died 22 January 2021) was a Chadian militant and politician. He served as Minister of the Interior and Minister of Public Security. He also served as a Deputy in the National Assembly of Chad, and was a member of the Patriotic Salvation Movement.

== Decorations ==
- Officer of the Order of Mono
