= Ministry of Justice and Human Rights (Chad) =

The Ministry of Justice and Human Rights of Chad is structured in the following manner:

- Cabinet Office
- General Inspection
- Central Administration
- Judicial services
- Joint regional delegations
- Organizations under guardianship

In keeping with the overseeing of human rights, the ministry manages the following judicial services:

- Court of Appeal
- Courts of the Grand Instances
- Labor Courts
- Courts of Commerce
- Justice of the peace

== List of ministers (Post-1960 upon achieving independence) ==
- François Tombalbaye (1961–1962)
- Ali Kosso (1962–1963)
- Joseph Brahim Seid (1966–1975)
- Nathe Amady (1975–1977)
- Mahamoud Abderaman (1977–1978)
- Abderaman Moussa (1979)
- Simon Narcisse Bozanga (1980)
- Djona Golo (1980–1981)
- Delwa Kassiré Koumakoye (1981–1982)
- Oudalbaye Naham (1983–1984)
- Routouang Golom Yoma (1985–1986)
- Djibril Negue Djogo (1987–1988)
- Delwa Kassiré Koumakoye (1989)
- Wadal Abdel Kader Kamougue (1990)
- Mallah Abakar (1991) [referred to as the Commissioner of Justice]
- Youssouf Togoumi (1992–1993)
- Delwa Kassiré Koumakoye (1993)
- Loum Hinaisou Laina (1994–1995)
- Maldoum Bada Abbas (1996)
- Abdelkarim Nadjo (1997)
- Nadjita Beassoumal (1998)
- Limane Mahamat (1999–2000)
- Mahamat Ahamat Ahlhabo (2001)
- Mahamat Abdoulaye (2002)
- Djimnaye Koudji Gaou (2003–2005)
- Albert Pahimi Padacké (2007–2008)
- Jean Alingué Bawoyeu (2008–2010)
- M'bailao Naimbaye Lossimian (2010–2013)
- Bechir Madet (2014–2017) [referred to as Minister of Justice and Human Rights]
- Ahmat Mahamat Hassan (2017)
- Djimet Arabi (2017–present)

== See also ==
- Justice ministry
- Politics of Chad
