= N'Djamena ammunition depot explosions =

2024 Chad military ammo depot explosions

- Date: 18–19 June 2024
- Time: "Shortly before midnight" (WAT)
- Duration: >90 minutes
- Location: Goudji District, N'Djamena, Chad; 12°9′27″N 15°2′6″E
- Cause: Unknown
- Deaths: 9+
- Injuries: 46+

The N'Djamena ammunition depot explosions occurred on 18–19 June 2024, when one of Chad's military ammunition depots exploded in the capital city, causing at least nine fatalities and 46 injuries on the site, located in the district of Goudji.

== Explosions ==
Eyewitnesses reported that the initial explosion began just before midnight, with a series of secondary explosions continuing for more than an hour and a half, causing ammunition from the military depot to be forcefully propelled from the storage site, and causing nearby buildings to shake. Multiple homes were located near the ammunition depot, as well as the N'Djamena International Airport and a military base where French troops were stationed.

One person was killed after a falling military shell struck him. Three more people were discovered wounded on the street, two of whom required motorbikes to take them to a hospital. The fire and explosions caused heavy smoke to fill the air around the district, and caused buildings up to 6 or 7 km from the ammo depot to shake. Soldiers were able to move several military vehicles and heavy weapons away from the depot.

== Aftermath ==
Several buildings close to the depot were gutted, and at least one gigantic crater was left inside the military camp, with a very large amount of unexploded shells munitions and burnt out military vehicles scattered throughout the premises. The Minister of Public Health Abdelmadjid Abderahim reported that the 46 injured from the blasts were in "extremely serious condition".

The President of Chad Mahamat Déby stated that the fire's cause was "not immediately clear", and that an investigation into the background of the incident would be conducted.
