= Aziza Baroud =

Chadian politician (1965–2025)

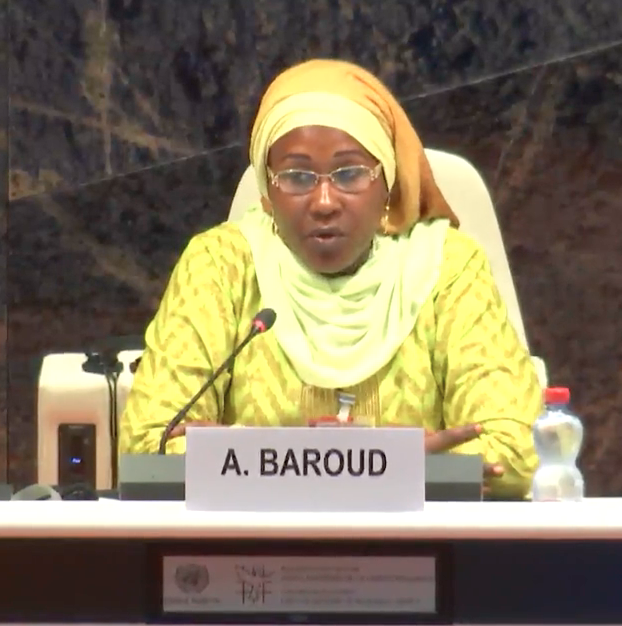
- Born: 4 August 1965
- Died: 19 June 2025 (aged 59)
- Education: Paris Dauphine University
- Occupations: Politician, diplomat
- Children: 4

Ammo Aziza Baroud (4 August 1965 – 19 June 2025) was a Chadian diplomat politician who served as Minister for Health and the Permanent Representative to the United Nations from 2020 to 2023.

== Life and career ==
Baroud was born on 4 August 1965. She studied economics in Paris and she graduated in 1989 with a master's degree from Université Paris Dauphine.

In September 2003, she became the Minister for Health under President Idriss Déby. She served until 2005 when she became a Presidential advisor until 2008 when she was again minister. This time she was the Minister for the Economy, Development Planning and International Cooperation. She served as a minister until 2010 and in the following year she began six years as a member of the National Assembly.

In 2018, she took over the chair of the Organisation of African, Caribbean and Pacific States committee of Ambassadors for a year from Sheila Sealy Monteith of Jamaica.

In 2019, she was the Ambassador of Chad to the European Union, the United Kingdom, and the Benelux countries. On 27 December 2019, Moustapha Ali Alifei who was Chad's Permanent Representative to the United Nations was recalled. Presidential decree appointed Baroud to replace him. She would be based in New York.

In 2020, during the COVID-19 pandemic Baroud was assisting First Lady Hinda Déby and Diego Canga Fano as they discussed business opportunities in Chad with European investors.

In September 2023, Aziza Baroud was appointed as Chad's Permanent Representative to the Organisation internationale de la Francophonie (OIF), a position she held until her death in 2025.

== Personal life and death ==
Baroud had four children. She died in Morocco on 19 June 2025, at the age of 59.
