= Isaac Tédambé =

Chadian economist and novelist (1954–2026)

- Born: 3 March 1954; Mubi, British Cameroon
- Died: October 2026 (aged 72); N'Djamena, Chad
- Occupations: Economist, novelist

Isaac Tédambé (3 March 1954 – October 2026) was a Chadian economist and novelist. He was best known for writing the novel Republic for Sale.

Tédambé died in N'Djamena in October 2026, at the age of 72.
