= Daoud Yaya Brahim =

Chadian military leader and politician

Daoud Yaya Brahim (30 January 1962 in Biltine - 2 February 2024 in Egypt) was a Chadian military leader and politician. He resigned as Minister of Defence on 18 October 2023 following a sex scandal involving the government's general secretary Haliki Choua Mahamat. His death was reported in 2024. He is survived by his wife and 12 children.
