= 2022 Chad floods =

Heavy rain disaster that occurred in July 2022 in Chad

- Date: July 2022 – present
- Location: Republic of Chad
- Deaths: 22

The 2022 Chadian floods began in the Republic of Chad during July 2022 and currently continued till September 2022 following the heaviest rains in the country since 1990. An estimated 442,000 Chadians had been affected or displaced by flooding by the end of August 2022, including in large parts of the national capital, N'Djamena.

== Cause ==
Chad, as well as neighboring countries across Central and West Africa, experienced above-normal rainfall during July and August 2022, causing floods in many countries. According to Idriss Abdallah Hassan, an official with the Ministry of Civil Aviation and National Meteorology, the government weather agency, "The country has not recorded such a quantity of rainwater since 1990."

== Damage ==
Twenty-two people had died as a result of the floods by mid-August 2022, according to a report by the United Nations Office for the Coordination of Humanitarian Affairs (OCHA). An estimated 442,000 people were displaced by flooding by the end of August 2022. Officials with the state weather agency described the flooding as "catastrophic".

Flooding destroyed an estimated 2,700 hectares of crops and arable farming land during August 2022.

Parts of the city of N'Djamena were hit particularly hard by the floods, with areas of the capital accessible only by boat. N'Djamena's Eighth District flooded beginning in July 2022 and remained underwater in early September 2022. According to Chadian officials and residents of the Eighth District, all of the district's neighborhoods were flooded. Residents sought shelter in other parts of the city.
