= 2014 in Chad =

- Decades: 1990s; 2000s; 2010s; 2020s
- See also: Other events of 2014; Timeline of Chadian history

The following lists events that happened during 2014 in Chad.

== Incumbents ==
- President: Idriss Déby
- Prime Minister: Kalzeubet Pahimi Deubet

== Events ==
=== May ===
- May 17 - Nigeria, Niger, Cameroon, Benin, and Chad unite to combat Boko Haram.

=== August ===
- August 17 - Chadian troops rescue 85 hostages from Boko Haram who had been kidnapped in Nigeria and taken over the border into Chad.

=== December ===
- December 22 - Chad abstains placing North Korea's human rights record on the United Nations Security Council's agenda.
