= Freedom and Democracy Day =

National holiday in Chad

- Observed by: Chad
- Date: 1 December
- Next time: 1 December 2026
- Frequency: annual

Freedom and Democracy Day is a national holiday in Chad, falling on 1 December. Government offices and businesses close. The holiday commemorates the overthrow of Hissène Habré by Idriss Déby in 1990.
