= 2015 in Chad =

- Decades: 1990s; 2000s; 2010s; 2020s
- See also: Other events of 2015; Timeline of Chadian history

The following lists events that happened during 2015 in Chad.

== Incumbents ==
- Idriss Déby, President, 1990-current
- Kalzeubet Pahimi Deubet, Prime Minister, 2013-current

== January ==
- Refugees fled Borno State, Nigeria on 9 January, following the Boko Haram massacre in the town of Baga. 7,300 fled to neighbouring Chad while over 1,000 were trapped on the island of Kangala in Lake Chad. Nigeria's army vowed to recapture the town, while Niger and Chad withdrew their forces from a transnational force tasked with combating militants.
- The Military of Chad entered Cameroon to assist in fighting against Boko Haram insurgents on 15 January.
- Chadian authorities decided on 17 January to send troops to Nigeria and Cameroon to fight Boko Haram militants.

== February ==
- Boko Haram militants attack Chad for the first time after 30 fighters crossed Lake Chad in four motorboats and attacked the village of Ngouboua. Chad recently joined Nigeria, Niger, and Cameroon in a military coalition against Boko Haram.

== March ==
- Chadian and Nigerien troops begin their joint anti-Boko offensive in Nigeria.

== June ==
- Boko Haram militants killed themselves in two suicide bomb attacks on police stations in N'Djamena, killing 34 people. Police arrested 60 people and seized a stockpile of firearms.

== August ==
- On August 24, President Deby replaced Abderahim Bireme Hamid, his Interior Minister, with former Interior Minister Ahmat Mahamat Bachir. He replaced the Finance Minister, Bedoumra Kordje, with Ngarlenan Docdjengar.

== October ==
- Five Boko Haram militants killed themselves in suicide bomb attacks in the market in Baga Solo on Lake Chad, killing 41 people and wounding 48 others on 11 October.
- The government stopped paying civil servants, including public school teachers, in October due to falling oil prices, leading to strikes and riots throughout the country. State workers worked for three months with no pay.

== December ==
- Three suicide bombers suspected of Boko Haram affiliation attacked the island of Loulou Fou in Lake Chad, killing 30 and injuring another 80 people.
