= 2019 in Chad =

- Decades: 1990s; 2000s; 2010s; 2020s
- See also: Other events of 2019; Timeline of Chadian history

Events in the year 2019 in Chad.

== Incumbents ==
- President: Idriss Déby

== Events ==
=== Sport ===
- The 2019 LINAFOOT is the 31st season of the Chad Premier League
- 19 to 31 August – Chad competes at the 2019 African Games in Rabat.

== Deaths ==
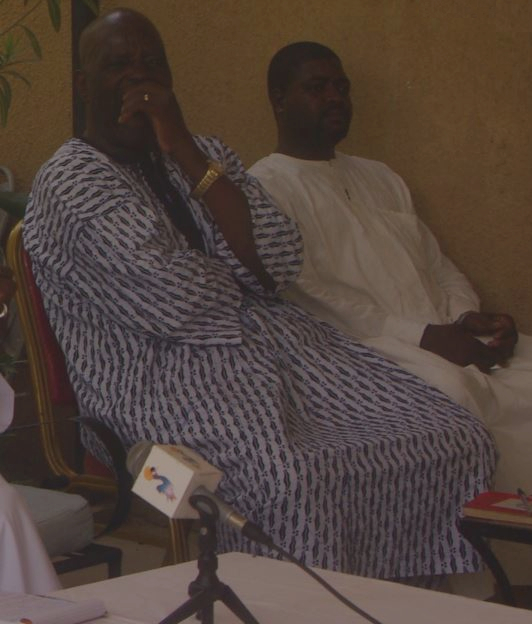
Djimrangar Dadnadji

- 13 June – Bourkou Louise Kabo, politician (b. 1934).
- 15 September – Lol Mahamat Choua, politician, President (b. 1939).
- 31 December – Djimrangar Dadnadji, politician, Prime Minister (b. 1954).
