= Djimadoum Tiraina =

Politician from Chad

Vice President of Chad
- In office 20 April 2021 – 8 October 2022
- President: Mahamat Déby
- Prime Minister: Albert Pahimi Padacké
- Preceded by: Bada Abbas Maldoum (1991)

Djimadoum Tiraina is a politician from Chad who was a Vice President of Chad after the death of President Idriss Déby and Minister of Armed Forces. He is also the Vice President of Transitional Military Council.
