= COVID-19 pandemic in Chad =

Ongoing COVID-19 viral pandemic in Chad

- Disease: COVID-19
- Pathogen: SARS-CoV-2
- Location: Chad
- Index case: N'Djamena
- Arrival date: 19 March 2020 (6 years and 8 months)
- Confirmed cases: 7,702
- Recovered: 7,483
- Deaths: 194

Government website
- Ministère de la Santé Publique du Tchad

The COVID-19 pandemic in Chad was a part of the worldwide pandemic of coronavirus disease 2019 (COVID-19) caused by severe acute respiratory syndrome coronavirus 2 (SARS-CoV-2). The virus was confirmed to have reached Chad in March 2020. As the third least developed nation in the world, according to the HDI in 2019, Chad has faced unique economic, social, and political challenges under the strain of the COVID-19 pandemic.

== Background ==
On 12 January 2020, the World Health Organization (WHO) confirmed that a novel coronavirus was the cause of a complex respiratory illness in a cluster of people in Wuhan, Hubei, China, which was reported to the WHO on 31 December 2019.

The case fatality ratio for COVID-19 has been much lower than SARS of 2003, but the transmission has been significantly greater, with a significant total death toll. Model-based simulations for Chad indicate that the 95% confidence interval for the time-varying reproduction number R_{t} for Chad fluctuated around 1.0 in late 2020 and early 2021. Studies on the ground have illustrated that the country is not adequately equipped to handle a pandemic. With roots tracing back to a violent and recent colonial history, many sectors of the Chadian economy and government are under-developed. Of specific concern regarding a global pandemic, the health sector faces many challenges in Chad. Issues such as geographic accessibility, government and foreign-aid funding conflicts, brain drain emigration, and poor infrastructure shape the scope of care systems.

== Timeline ==
=== 2020 ===
==== March ====
- On 19 March, Chadian authorities reported their first case, a Moroccan passenger who flew from Douala.
- On 26 March, with three cases already reported, Chadian authorities reported two additional positive cases. The cases were a 48-year-old Chadian and a 55-year-old Cameroonian passenger on a 17 March Ethiopian Airlines flight from Dubai and Brussels, respectively, via Addis Ababa.
- On 30 March, two more cases of COVID-19 were reported, a Chadian citizen from Douala and a Swiss citizen from Brussels.
- In total in March, 7 cases were confirmed with no deaths. As there were no recoveries in March, the number of active cases at the end of the month was 7.

==== April ====
- On 2 April, Chad registered a new case of COVID-19, a Chadian who traveled from Dubai via Abuja.
- On 3 April, a new case of COVID-19 was registered, a French citizen who traveled from Brussels via Paris.
- On 6 April, Chad recorded its first case of local contamination, a 31-year-old Chadian who was in contact with another Chadian who had diagnosed positive.
- On 9 April, health officials reported a new case of virus infection, a 59-year-old Chadian who arrived on March 25 in N'Djamena. The man was returning from Pakistan, via Cameroon, having reached N'Djamena by land. The man continued his journey to Abéché where he was finally quarantined on 4 April. The test was declared positive on 8 April.
- During April there were 66 new cases, bringing the total number of confirmed cases to 73. Two deaths were reported on 28 April and three more on 30 April, bringing the total death toll to five. 33 patients recovered, leaving 35 active cases at the end of the month.

==== May ====
- In May there were 705 new cases, bringing the total number of confirmed cases to 778. The death toll rose to 65. There were 458 new recoveries, raising the total number of recovered patients to 491. At the end of the month there were 222 patients representing active cases.

==== June ====
- During June there were 88 new cases, bringing the total number of confirmed cases to 866. The death toll rose by 9 to 74. There were 290 more recoveries, bringing the total number of recovered patients to 781. At the end of June there were 11 active cases.

==== July to December ====
- There were 70 new cases in July, 77 in August, 180 in September, 306 in October, 189 in November, and 425 in December. The total number of cases stood at 936 in July, 1013 in August, 1193 in September, 1499 in October, 1688 in November, and 2113 in December.
- The number of recovered patients stood at 813 in July, 880 in August, 1007 in September, 1330 in October, 1525 in November, and 1704 in December, leaving 48 active cases at the end of July, 56 at the end of August, 101 at the end of September, 71 at the end of October, 62 at the end of November, and 305 at the end of December.
- The death toll rose to 75 in July, 77 in August, 85 in September, 98 in October, 101 in November, and 104 in December.

=== January to December 2021 ===
- On 1 January, Chad locked down its capital N'Djamena in response to rising infections. The country banned gatherings of over 10 people, limited its airspace to cargo flights only, and shut down schools, universities, places of worship, bars, restaurants and non-essential public services.

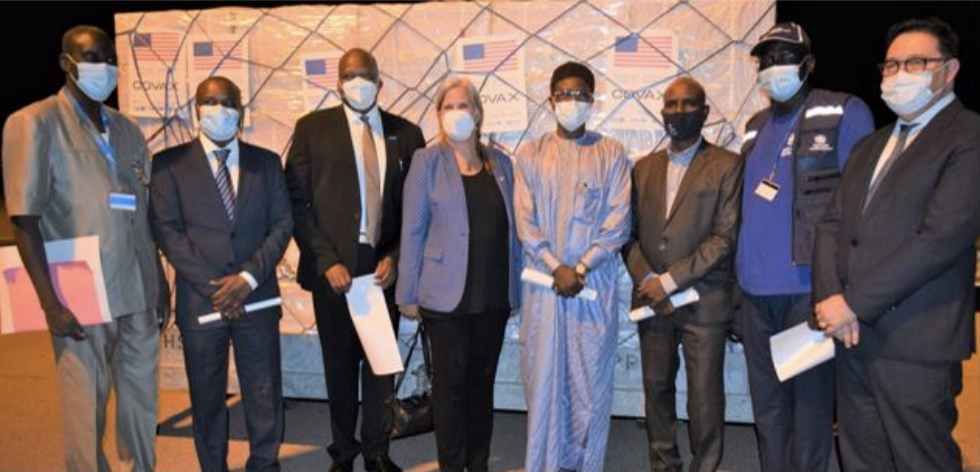
The US delivers COVID-19 vaccines to Chad as part of the COVAX initiative in 2021

- Vaccinations started on 4 June, initially with 200,000 doses of the Sinopharm BIBP vaccine donated by China.
- There were 4,070 confirmed cases in 2021, bringing the total number of cases to 6,183. 80 persons died, bringing the total death toll to 184.
- Modelling carried out by the Regional Office for Africa of the World Health Organization suggests that due to underreporting, the true number of cases by the end of 2021 was around 7.2 million while the true number of COVID-19 deaths was around 9900.

=== January to December 2022 ===
- There were 1,468 confirmed cases in 2022, bringing the total number of cases to 7,651. Ten persons died, bringing the total death toll to 194.

=== January to December 2023 ===
- There were 171 confirmed cases in 2023, bringing the total number of cases to 7,822. The death toll remained unchanged.

== Statistics ==
=== Confirmed new cases per day ===
View source data.

=== Confirmed Deaths per day ===
View source data.

== Response ==
As a preventive measure, the government cancelled all flights into the country, except for cargo flights. Furthermore, the government responded with similar and standard global practices of mandating mask wearing in public spaces, creating a curfew from 8 pm to 5 am, checking temperatures at airports and supporting "quarantine hotels", as well raising public awareness of the viral threat through campaigns and advertisements. Schools, public life such as bars and social clubs, and government work was closed along with social distancing requirements. Of importance to note is the paradox of low corona virus cases in Chad given the strained health systems in place. Researchers have theorized that these low numbers may have a multitude of answers: notably the population's previous exposure and experience with infectious disease, as well the average age of the population, 52.8 years, being under the highest levels of "at-risk ages" for the COVID-19 pandemic, around 65 years old and poor records and/or testing of cases. The IMF details responses the Chadian government has worked to implement such as subsidizing the agricultural sector, tax break plans, focusing on essential imports such as food distribution, suspending household bills, and clearing domestic debt. Of importance to track in response to the pandemic is Chad's increasing ties with China. China has a relationship with the nation through generous loan programs, and throughout the pandemic these ties have increased as China has stepped up to provide food distribution aid as well as medical equipment and support in zones of active violence in Chad.

== See also ==
- COVID-19 pandemic in Africa
- COVID-19 pandemic by country and territory
