= Vice President of Chad =

Deputy head of state of Chad

Vice President of the Republic of Chad
- Vice President
- Coat of arms of Chad
- Residence: Presidential Palace, N'Djamena
- Inaugural holder: Mamari Djimé Ngakinar
- Formation: April 1975

The vice president of Chad (Arabic: نائب رئيس تشاد, French: Vice-Président du Tchad) was a political position in Chad from 1975 to 1982, from 1990 to 1991 and from 2021 to 2022.

There were no provisions defined for succession during the regime of Hissène Habré until 1989.

A revision to the constitution in 2020 created again the position of a Vice President appointed by the President of Chad. However, the position was never filled.

According to the previous Constitution of Chad, the president of the National Assembly is the successor of President of Chad in case of a vacancy. As of 2021, Vice-President of the Transitional Military Council will succeed President in case of a vacancy.

== List of vice presidents of Chad ==
Name	Took office	Left office	Head of state	Notes
Mamari Djimé Ngakinar	April 1975	August 1978	Félix Malloum	
Hissène Habré	August 1978	March 1979	Félix Malloum	
Negue Djogo	April 1979	August 1979	Lol Mahamat Choua	
Wadel Abdelkader Kamougué	August 1979	June 1982	Goukouni Oueddei	
Bada Abbas Maldoum	December 1990	February 1991	Idriss Déby	
Djimadoum Tiraina	20 April 2021	8 October 2022	Mahamat Déby	

== See also ==
- Politics of Chad
- List of heads of state of Chad
- List of prime ministers of Mali
