= History of Chad =

Chad (Arabic: تشاد; French: Tchad), officially the Republic of Chad, is a landlocked country in Central Africa. It borders Libya to the north, Sudan to the east, the Central African Republic to the south, Cameroon and Nigeria to the southwest, and Niger to the west. Due to its distance from the sea and its largely desert climate, the country is sometimes referred to as the "Dead Heart of Africa".

== Prehistory ==
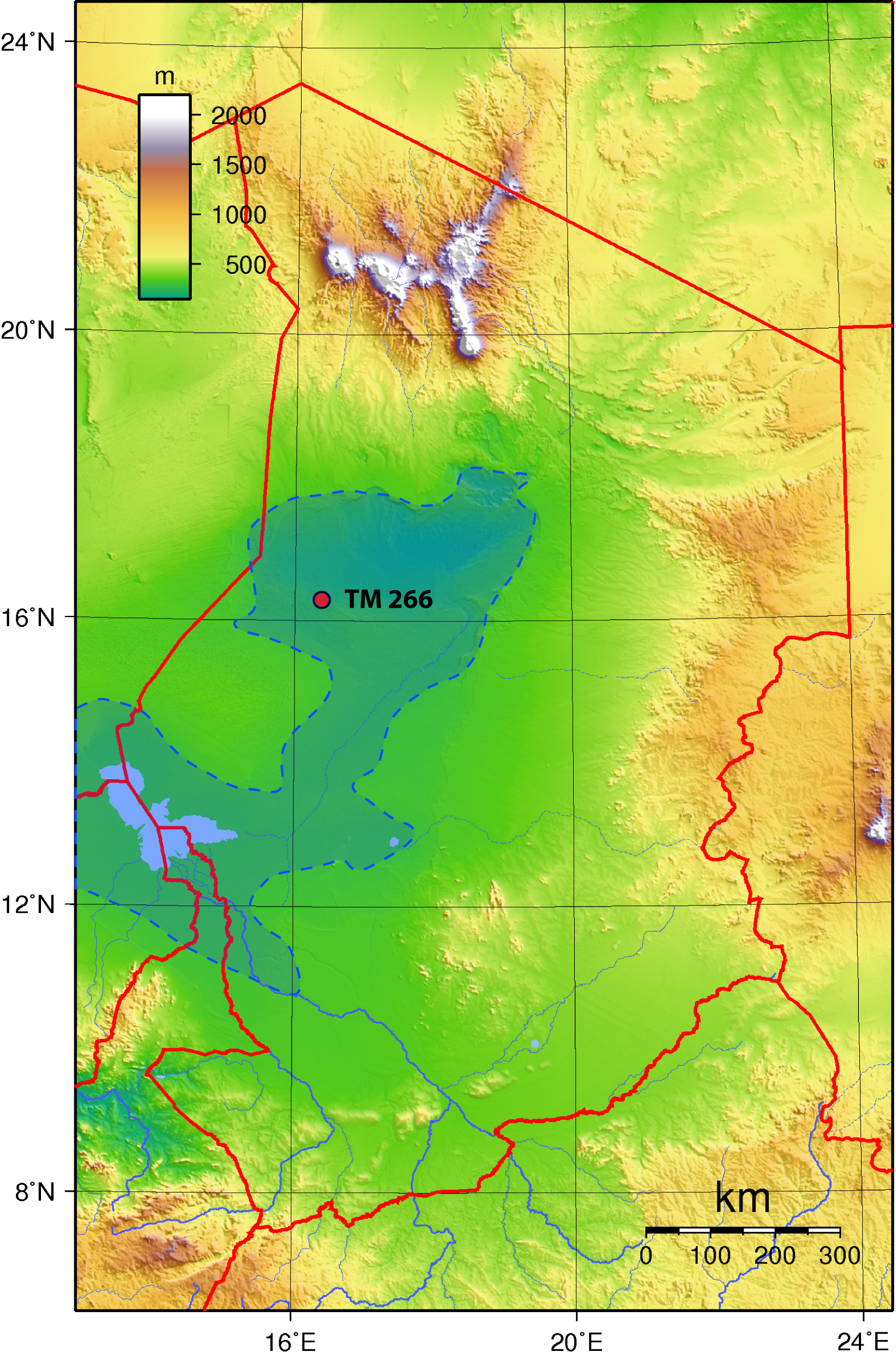
Location of Sahelanthropus tchadensis find in 2002

The territory now known as Chad possesses some of the richest archaeological sites in Africa. A hominid skull was found by Michel Brunet, that is more than 7 million years old, the oldest discovered anywhere in the world; it has been given the name Sahelanthropus tchadensis. In 1996 Brunet unearthed a hominid jaw, which he named Australopithecus bahrelghazali, unofficially dubbed Abel. It was dated using beryllium-based radiometric dating as living c. 3.6 million years ago.

During the 7th millennium BC, the northern half of Chad was part of a broad expanse of land, stretching from the Indus River in the east to the Atlantic Ocean in the west, in which ecological conditions favored early human settlement. Rock art of the "Round Head" style, found in the Ennedi region, has been dated to before the 7th millennium BC and, because of the tools with which the rocks were carved and the scenes they depict, may represent the oldest evidence in the Sahara of Neolithic industries. Many of the pottery-making and Neolithic activities in Ennedi date back further than any of those of the Nile Valley to the east.

In the prehistoric period, Chad was much wetter than it is today, as evidenced by large game animals depicted in rock paintings in the Tibesti and Borkou regions.

Recent linguistic research suggests that all of Africa's major language groupings south of the Sahara Desert (except Khoisan, which is not considered a valid genetic grouping anyway), i.e. the Afro-Asiatic, Nilo-Saharan and Niger–Congo phyla, originated in prehistoric times in a narrow band between Lake Chad and the Nile Valley. The origins of Chad's peoples, however, remain unclear. Several of the proven archaeological sites have been only partially studied, and other sites of great potential have yet to be mapped.

== Era of Empires (900–1900) ==
At the end of the 1st millennium, the formation of states began across central Chad in the sahelian zone between the desert and the savanna. For almost the next 1,000 years, these states, their relations with each other, and their effects on the peoples who lived in stateless societies along their peripheries dominated Chad's political history. Recent research suggests that indigenous Africans founded these states, not migrating Arabic-speaking groups, as was believed previously. Nonetheless, immigrants, Arabic-speaking or otherwise, played a significant role, along with Islam, in the formation and early evolution of these states.

Most states began as kingdoms, in which the king was considered divine and endowed with temporal and spiritual powers. All states were militaristic (or they did not survive long), but none was able to expand far into southern Chad, where forests and the tsetse fly complicated the use of cavalry. Control over the trans-Saharan trade routes that passed through the region formed the economic basis of these kingdoms. Although many states rose and fell, the most important and durable of the empires were Kanem–Bornu, Baguirmi, and Ouaddai, according to most written sources (mainly court chronicles and writings of Arab traders and travelers).Chad – Era of Empires, A.D. 900–1900

=== Kanem–Bornu ===
The Kanem Empire originated in the 9th century AD to the northeast of Lake Chad. Historians agree that the leaders of the new state were ancestors of the Kanembu people. Toward the end of the 11th century the Sayfawa king (or mai, the title of the Sayfawa rulers) Hummay, converted to Islam. In the following century the Sayfawa rulers expanded southward into Kanem, where was to rise their first capital, Njimi. Kanem's expansion peaked during the long and energetic reign of Mai Dunama Dabbalemi (c. 1221–1259).

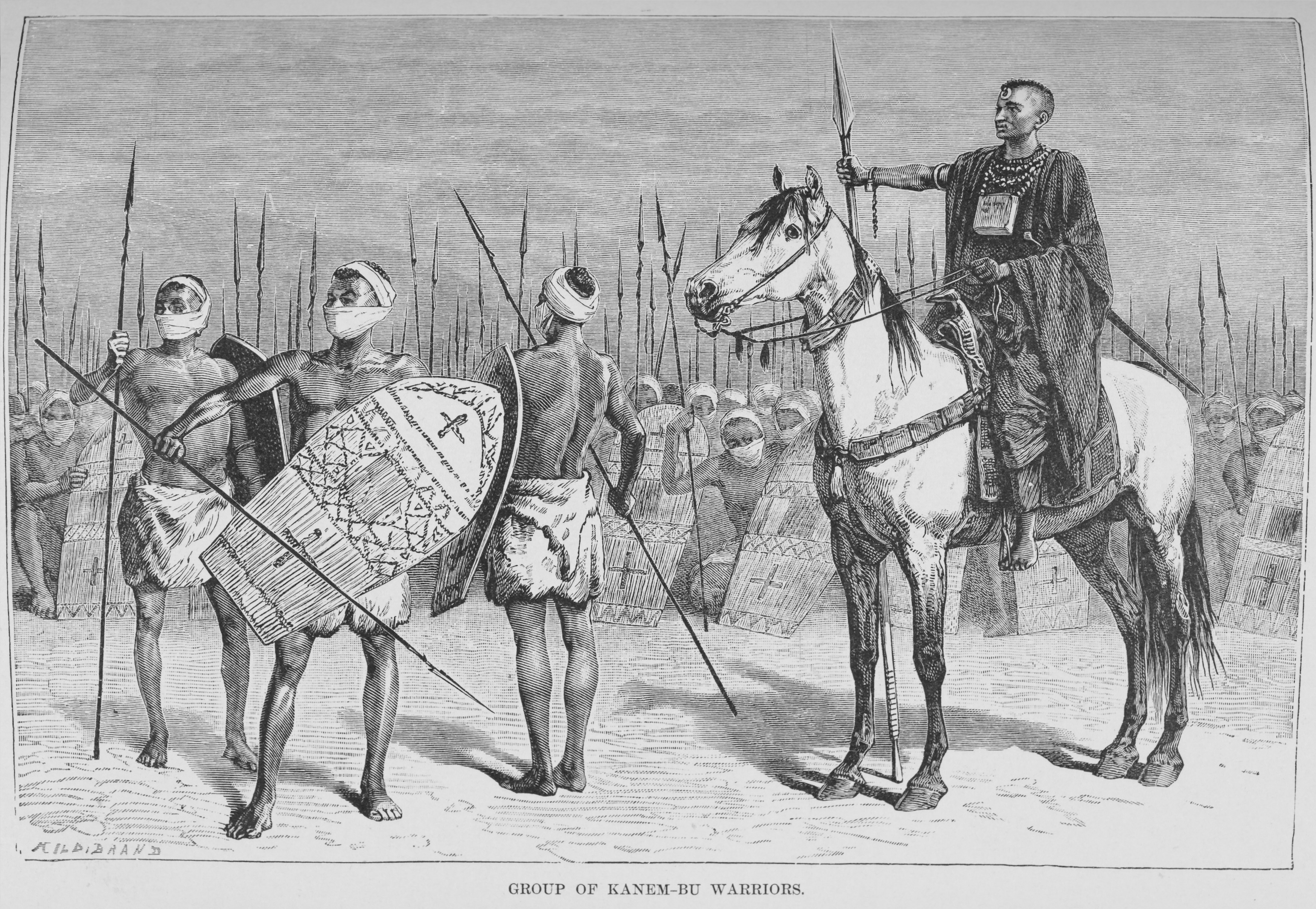
Group of Kanem-Bu warriors

By the end of the 14th century, internal struggles and external attacks had torn Kanem apart. Finally, around 1396 the Bulala invaders forced Mai Umar Idrismi to abandon Njimi and move the Kanembu people to Bornu on the western edge of Lake Chad. Over time, the intermarriage of the Kanembu and Bornu peoples created a new people and language, the Kanuri, and founded a new capital, Ngazargamu.

Kanem–Bornu peaked during the reign of the outstanding statesman Mai Idris Aluma (c. 1571–1603). Aluma is remembered for his military skills, administrative reforms, and Islamic piety. The administrative reforms and military brilliance of Aluma sustained the empire until the mid-17th century, when its power began to fade. By the early 19th century, Kanem–Bornu was clearly an empire in decline, and in 1808 Fulani warriors conquered Ngazargamu. Bornu survived, but the Sayfawa dynasty ended in 1846 and the Empire itself fell in 1893.

=== Baguirmi and Wadai ===
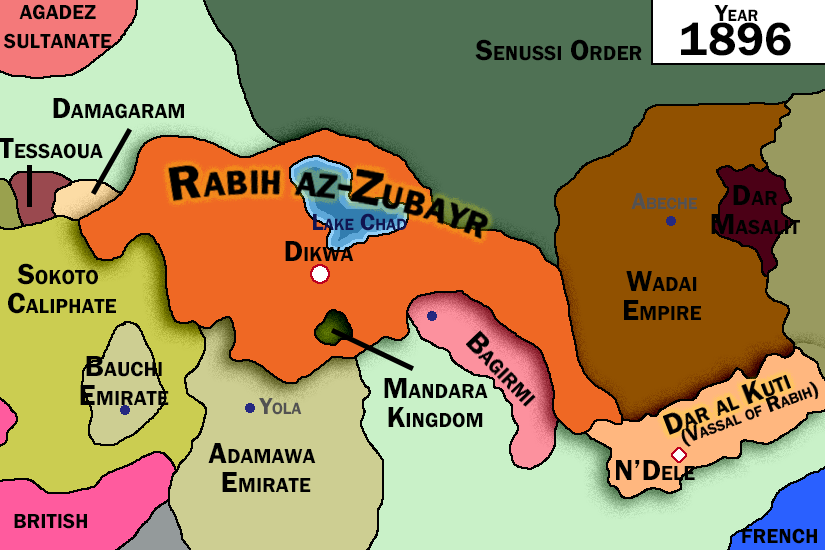
Rabih az-Zubayr's Empire, Wadai Sultanate, Senussi and other state entities in the region, 1896

The Kingdom of Baguirmi, located southeast of Kanem-Bornu, was founded in the late 15th or early 16th century, and adopted Islam in the reign of Abdullah IV (1568–1598). Baguirmi was in a tributary relationship with Kanem–Bornu at various points in the 17th and 18th centuries, then to Ouaddai in the 19th century. In 1893, Baguirmi sultan Abd ar Rahman Gwaranga surrendered the territory to France, and it became a French protectorate.

The Wadai Sultanate (Ouaddai Kingdom), west of Kanem–Bornu, was established in the early 16th century by Tunjur rulers. In the 1630s, Abd al Karim invaded and established an Islamic sultanate. Among its most impactful rulers for the next three centuries were Muhammad Sabun, who controlled a new trade route to the north and established a currency during the early 19th century, and Muhammad Sharif, whose military campaigns in the mid 19th century fended off an assimilation attempt from Darfur, conquered Baguirmi, and successfully resisted French colonization. However, Ouaddai lost its independence to France after a war from 1909 to 1912.

== Colonialism (1900–1940) ==
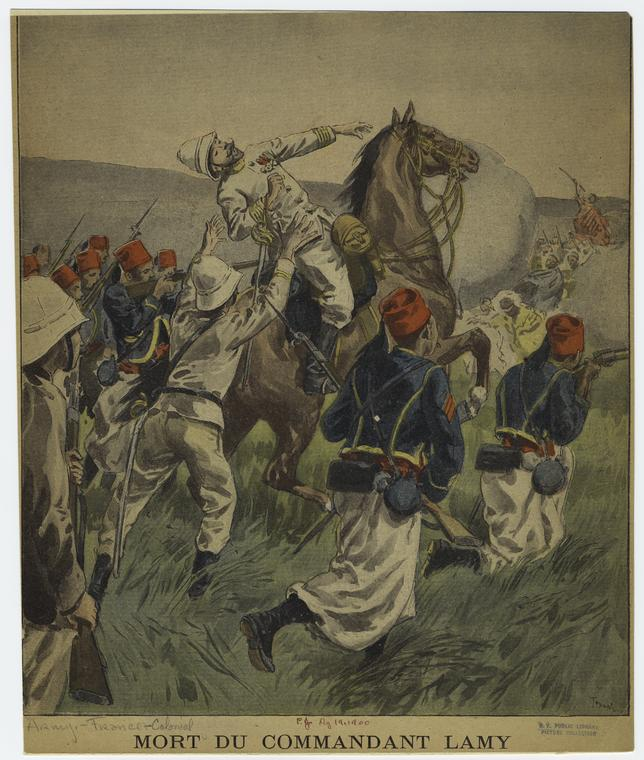
Death of Commander Lamy of France, 1900

The French first invaded Chad in 1891, establishing their authority through military expeditions primarily against the Muslim kingdoms. The decisive colonial battle for Chad was fought on April 22, 1900, at Battle of Kousséri between forces of French Major Amédée-François Lamy and forces of the Sudanese warlord Rabih az-Zubayr. Both leaders were killed in the battle.

In 1905, administrative responsibility for Chad was placed under a governor-general stationed at Brazzaville, capital of French Equatorial Africa (FEA). Chad did not have a separate colonial status until 1920, when it was placed under a lieutenant-governor stationed in Fort-Lamy (today N'Djamena).

Two fundamental themes dominated Chad's colonial experience with the French: an absence of policies designed to unify the territory and an exceptionally slow pace of modernization. In the French scale of priorities, the colony of Chad ranked near the bottom, and the French came to perceive Chad primarily as a source of raw cotton and untrained labour to be used in the more productive colonies to the south.

Throughout the colonial period, large areas of Chad were never governed effectively: in the huge BET Prefecture, the handful of French military administrators usually left the people alone, and in central Chad, French rule was only slightly more substantive. In reality, France only managed to effectively govern the south.

== Decolonization (1940–1960) ==
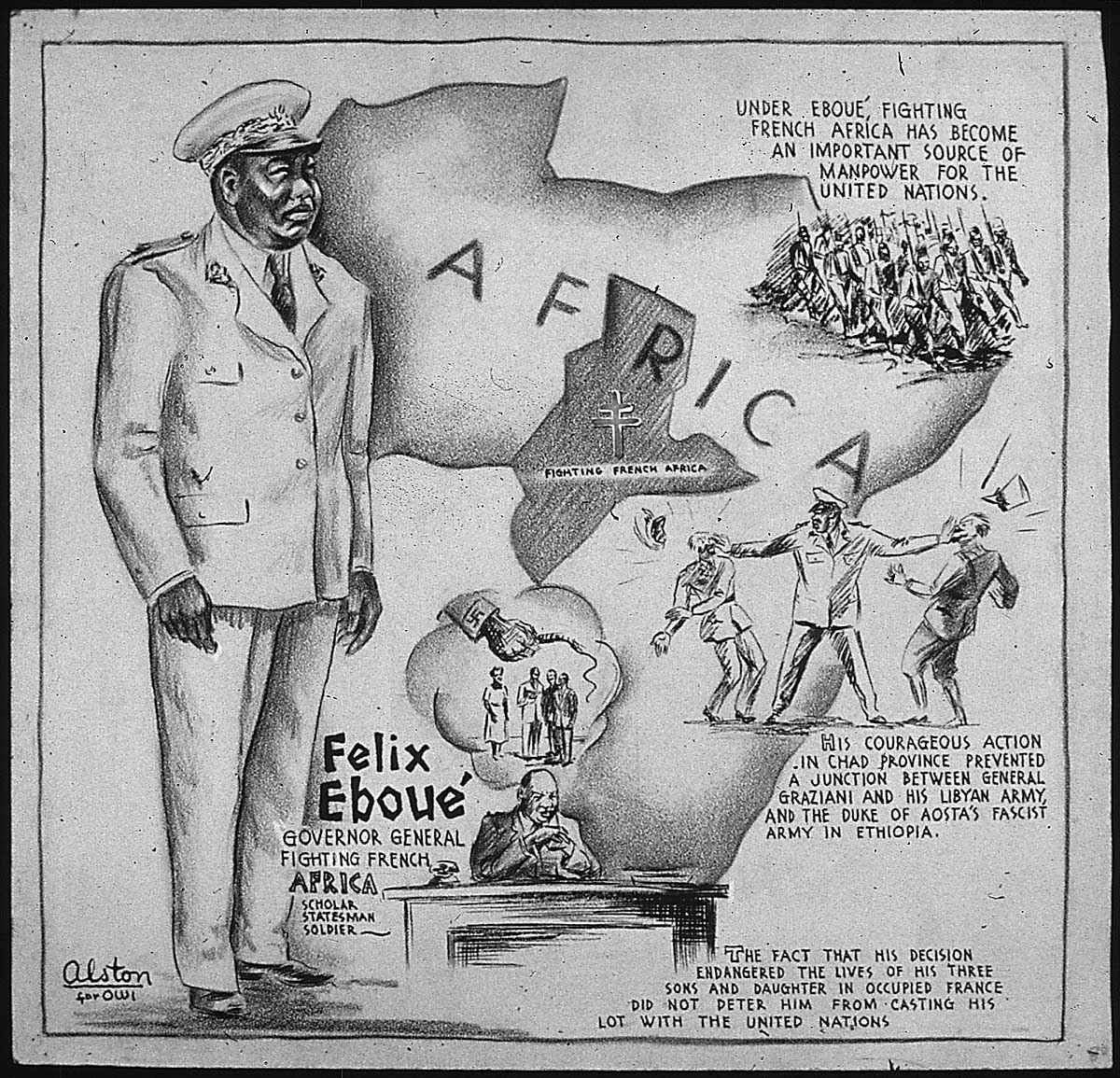
Félix Éboué in a contemporary World War II cartoon

During World War II, Chad was the first French colony to rejoin the Allies (August 26, 1940), after the defeat of France by Germany. Under the administration of Félix Éboué, France's first black colonial governor, a military column, commanded by Colonel Philippe Leclerc de Hauteclocque, and including two battalions of Sara troops, moved north from N'Djamena (then Fort Lamy) to engage Axis forces in Libya, where, in partnership with the British Army's Long Range Desert Group, they captured Kufra. On January 21, 1942, N'Djamena was bombed by a German aircraft.

After the war ended, local parties started to develop in Chad. The first to be born was the radical Chadian Progressive Party (PPT) in February 1947, initially headed by Panamanian born Gabriel Lisette, but from 1959 headed by François Tombalbaye. The more conservative Chadian Democratic Union (UDT) was founded in November 1947 and represented French commercial interests and a bloc of traditional leaders composed primarily of Muslim and Ouaddaïan nobility. The confrontation between the PPT and UDT was more than simply ideological; it represented different regional identities, with the PPT representing the Christian and animist south and the UDT the Islamic north. In April 1952, the Bébalem massacre was carried out by the French authorities against farmers who protested the announced victory of the UDT in the local elections.

The PPT won the May 1957 pre-independence elections thanks to a greatly expanded franchise, and Lisette led the government of the Territorial Assembly until he lost a confidence vote on February 11, 1959. After a referendum on territorial autonomy on September 28, 1958, French Equatorial Africa was dissolved, and its four constituent states – Gabon, Congo (Brazzaville), the Central African Republic, and Chad became autonomous members of the French Community from November 28, 1958. Following Lisette's fall in February 1959 the opposition leaders Gontchome Sahoulba and Ahmed Koulamallah could not form a stable government, so the PPT was again asked to form an administration – which it did under the leadership of François Tombalbaye on March 26, 1959. On July 12, 1960, France agreed to Chad becoming fully independent. On August 11, 1960, Chad became an independent country and François Tombalbaye became its first president.

== Tombalbaye era (1960–1975) ==
One of the most prominent aspects of Tombalbaye's rule to prove itself was his authoritarianism and distrust of democracy. Already in January 1962 he banned all political parties except his own PPT, and started immediately concentrating all power in his own hands. His treatment of opponents, real or imagined, was extremely harsh, filling the prisons with thousands of political prisoners.

Furthermore, he pursued constant discrimination against the central and northern regions of Chad, where the southern Chadian administrators came to be perceived as arrogant and incompetent. This resentment at last exploded in a tax revolt on September 2, 1965, in the Guéra Prefecture, causing 500 deaths. The year after saw the birth in Sudan of the National Liberation Front of Chad (FROLINAT), created to militarily oust Tombalbaye and the Southern dominance. It was the start of a bloody civil war.

Tombalbaye resorted to calling in French troops; while moderately successful, they were not fully able to quell the insurgency. Proving more fortunate was his choice to break with the French and seek friendly ties with Libyan Brotherly Leader Gaddafi, taking away the rebels' principal source of supplies.

But while he had reported some success against the rebels, Tombalbaye started behaving more and more irrationally and brutally, continuously eroding his consensus among the southern elites, which dominated all key positions in the army, the civil service and the ruling party. As a consequence on April 13, 1975, several units of N'Djamena's gendarmerie killed Tombalbaye during a coup.

== Military rule (1975–1978) ==
The coup d'état that terminated Tombalbaye's government received an enthusiastic response in N'Djamena. The southerner General Félix Malloum emerged early as the chairman of the new junta.

The new military leaders were unable to retain for long the popularity that they had gained through their overthrow of Tombalbaye. Malloum proved himself unable to cope with the FROLINAT and at the end decided his only chance was in coopting some of the rebels: in 1978 he allied himself with the insurgent leader Hissène Habré, who entered the government as prime minister.

== Civil war (1979–1982) ==
Internal dissent within the government led Prime Minister Habré to send his forces against Malloum's national army in the capital in February 1979. Malloum was ousted from the presidency, but the resulting civil war among the 11 emergent factions was so widespread that it rendered the central government largely irrelevant. At that point, other African governments decided to intervene.

A series of four international conferences held first under Nigerian and then Organization of African Unity (OAU) sponsorship attempted to bring the Chadian factions together. At the fourth conference, held in Lagos, Nigeria, in August 1979, the Lagos Accord was signed. This accord established a transitional government pending national elections. In November 1979, the Transitional Government of National Unity (GUNT) was created with a mandate to govern for 18 months. Goukouni Oueddei, a northerner, was named president; Colonel Kamougué, a southerner, Vice President; and Habré, Minister of Defense. This coalition proved fragile; in January 1980, fighting broke out again between Goukouni's and Habré's forces. With assistance from Libya, Goukouni regained control of the capital and other urban centers by year's end. However, Goukouni's January 1981 statement that Chad and Libya had agreed to work for the realization of complete unity between the two countries generated intense international pressure and Goukouni's subsequent call for the complete withdrawal of external forces. The United States foreign intelligence agency, CIA under the Reagan Administration took active part in supporting Hissène Habré. Human Rights Watch has reported "the United States helped Habré take power in the first clandestine operation launched by Ronald Reagan's CIA chief, William J. Casey, when he took over the agency in 1981..."

== Habré era (1982–1990) ==
Libya's partial withdrawal to the Aozou Strip in northern Chad cleared the way for Habré's forces to enter N’Djamena in June. Covert, or not so covert CIA activities in Chad supported Habré seizing power, and counter Libyan influence and other socialist leaning elements throughout the 1980s. French troops and an OAU peacekeeping force of 3,500 Nigerian, Senegalese, and Zairian troops, partially funded by the United States were present, appearing to play a neutral role during the conflict between Chad and Libya.

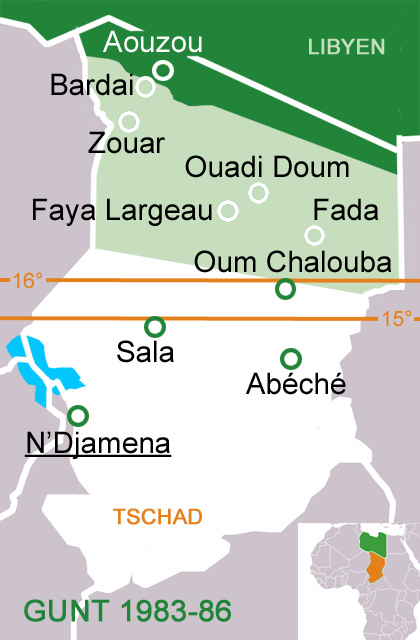
The Aozou Strip (dark green), claimed and occupied by Libya between 1976 and 1987, and territories held by Libyan-backed GUNT-forces (light green)

Habré continued to face armed opposition on various fronts, and was brutal in his repression of suspected opponents, massacring and torturing many during his rule. In the summer of 1983, GUNT forces launched an offensive against government positions in northern and eastern Chad with heavy Libyan support. In response to Libya's direct intervention, French and Zairian forces intervened to defend Habré, pushing Libyan and rebel forces north of the 16th parallel. In September 1984, the French and the Libyan governments announced an agreement for the mutual withdrawal of their forces from Chad. By the end of the year, all French and Zairian troops were withdrawn. Libya did not honor the withdrawal accord, and its forces continued to occupy the northern third of Chad.

Rebel commando groups (Codos) in southern Chad were broken up by government massacres in 1984. In 1985 Habré briefly reconciled with some of his opponents, including the Democratic Front of Chad (FDT) and the Coordinating Action Committee of the Democratic Revolutionary Council. Goukouni also began to rally toward Habré, and with his support Habré successfully expelled Libyan forces from most of Chadian territory. A cease-fire between Chad and Libya held from 1987 to 1988, and negotiations over the next several years led to the 1994 International Court of Justice decision granting Chad sovereignty over the Aouzou strip, effectively ending Libyan occupation. United States of America continued to support the Habré regime throughout its existence, militarily and economically.

== Idriss Déby era (1990–2021) ==
=== Rise to power ===
Rivalry between Hadjerai, Zaghawa and Gorane groups within the government grew in the late 1980s. In April 1989, Idriss Déby, one of Habré's leading generals and a Zaghawa, defected and fled to Darfur in Sudan, from which he mounted a Zaghawa-supported series of attacks on Habré (a Gorane). In December 1990, with Libyan assistance and no opposition from French troops stationed in Chad, Déby's forces successfully marched on N’Djamena. After 3 months of provisional government, Déby's Patriotic Salvation Movement (MPS) approved a national charter on February 28, 1991, with Déby as president.

During the next two years, Déby faced at least two coup attempts. Government forces clashed violently with rebel forces, including the Movement for Democracy and Development, MDD, National Revival Committee for Peace and Democracy (CSNPD), Chadian National Front (FNT) and the Western Armed Forces (FAO), near Lake Chad and in southern regions of the country. Earlier French demands for the country to hold a National Conference resulted in the gathering of 750 delegates representing political parties (which were legalized in 1992), the government, trade unions and the army to discuss the creation of a pluralist democratic regime.

However, unrest continued, sparked in part by large-scale killings of civilians in southern Chad. The CSNPD, led by Kette Moise and other southern groups entered into a peace agreement with government forces in 1994, which later broke down. Two new groups, the Armed Forces for a Federal Republic (FARF) led by former Kette ally Laokein Barde and the Democratic Front for Renewal (FDR), and a reformulated MDD clashed with government forces from 1994 to 1995.

=== Multiparty elections ===
Talks with political opponents in early 1996 did not go well, but Déby announced his intent to hold presidential elections in June. Déby won the country's first multi-party presidential elections with support in the second round from opposition leader Kebzabo, defeating General Kamougue (leader of the 1975 coup against Tombalbaye). Déby's MPS party won 63 of 125 seats in the January 1997 legislative elections. International observers noted numerous serious irregularities in presidential and legislative election proceedings.

By mid-1997 the government signed peace deals with FARF and the MDD leadership and succeeded in cutting off the groups from their rear bases in the Central African Republic and Cameroon. Agreements also were struck with rebels from the National Front of Chad (FNT) and Movement for Social Justice and Democracy in October 1997. However, peace was short-lived, as FARF rebels clashed with government soldiers, finally surrendering to government forces in May 1998. Barde was killed in the fighting, as were hundreds of other southerners, most civilians.

Since October 1998 Chadian Movement for Justice and Democracy (MDJT) rebels, led by Youssuf Togoimi until his death in September 2002, have skirmished with government troops in the Tibesti region, resulting in hundreds of civilian, government, and rebel casualties, but little ground won or lost. No active armed opposition has emerged in other parts of Chad, although Kette Moise, following senior postings at the Ministry of Interior, mounted a smallscale local operation near Moundou which was quickly and violently suppressed by government forces in late 2000.

Déby, in the mid-1990s, gradually restored basic functions of government and entered into agreements with the World Bank and IMF to carry out substantial economic reforms. Oil exploitation in the southern Doba region began in June 2000, with World Bank Board approval to finance a small portion of a project, the Chad-Cameroon Petroleum Development Project, aimed at transport of Chadian crude through a 1000-km buried pipeline through Cameroon to the Gulf of Guinea. The project established unique mechanisms for World Bank, private sector, government, and civil society collaboration to guarantee that future oil revenues benefit local populations and result in poverty alleviation. Success of the project depended on multiple monitoring efforts to ensure that all parties keep their commitments. These "unique" mechanisms for monitoring and revenue management have faced intense criticism from the beginning. Debt relief was accorded to Chad in May 2001.

Déby won a flawed 63% first-round victory in May 2001 presidential elections after legislative elections were postponed until spring 2002. Having accused the government of fraud, six opposition leaders were arrested (twice) and one opposition party activist was killed following the announcement of election results. However, despite claims of government corruption, favoritism of Zaghawas, and abuses by the security forces, opposition party and labor union calls for general strikes and more active demonstrations against the government have been unsuccessful. Despite movement toward democratic reform, power remains in the hands of a northern ethnic oligarchy.

In 2003 Chad began receiving refugees from the Darfur region of western Sudan. More than 200,000 refugees fled the fighting between two rebel groups and government-supported militias known as Janjaweed. A number of border incidents led to the Chadian–Sudanese War.

=== Oil producing and military improvement ===
Chad became an oil producer in 2003. To avoid resource curse and corruption, elaborate plans sponsored by World Bank were made. This plan ensured transparency in payments, as well as that 80% of money from oil exports would be spent on five priority development sectors, two most important of these being: education and healthcare. However money started getting diverted towards the military even before the civil war broke out. In 2006 when the civil war escalated, Chad abandoned previous economic plans sponsored by World Bank and added "national security" as priority development sector, money from this sector was used to improve the military. During the civil war, more than 600 million dollars were used to buy fighter jets, attack helicopters, and armored personnel carriers.

Chad earned between 10 and 11 billion dollars from oil production, and estimated 4 billion dollars were invested in the army.

=== War in the east ===
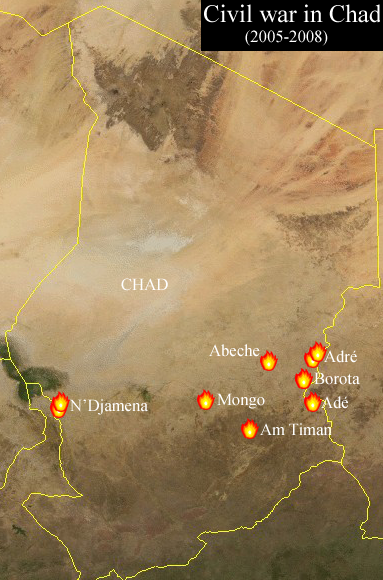
Hot spots in the civil war

The war started on December 23, 2005, when the government of Chad declared a state of war with Sudan and called for the citizens of Chad to mobilize themselves against the "common enemy," which the Chadian government sees as the Rally for Democracy and Liberty (RDL) militants, Chadian rebels, backed by the Sudanese government, and Sudanese militiamen. Militants have attacked villages and towns in eastern Chad, stealing cattle, murdering citizens, and burning houses. Over 200,000 refugees from the Darfur region of northwestern Sudan currently claim asylum in eastern Chad. Chadian president Idriss Déby accuses Sudanese President Omar Hasan Ahmad al-Bashir of trying to "destabilize our country, to drive our people into misery, to create disorder and export the war from Darfur to Chad."

An attack on the Chadian town of Adre near the Sudanese border led to the deaths of either one hundred rebels, as every news source other than CNN has reported, or three hundred rebels. The Sudanese government was blamed for the attack, which was the second in the region in three days, but Sudanese foreign ministry spokesman Jamal Mohammed Ibrahim denies any Sudanese involvement, "We are not for any escalation with Chad. We technically deny involvement in Chadian internal affairs." This attack was the final straw that led to the declaration of war by Chad and the alleged deployment of the Chadian airforce into Sudanese airspace, which the Chadian government denies.

An attack on N'Djamena was defeated on April 13, 2006, in the Battle of N'Djamena. The President on national radio stated that the situation was under control, but residents, diplomats and journalists reportedly heard shots of weapons fire.

On November 25, 2006, rebels captured the eastern town of Abeche, capital of the Ouaddaï Region and center for humanitarian aid to the Darfur region in Sudan. On the same day, a separate rebel group Rally of Democratic Forces had captured Biltine. On November 26, 2006, the Chadian government claimed to have recaptured both towns, although rebels still claimed control of Biltine. Government buildings and humanitarian aid offices in Abeche were said to have been looted. The Chadian government denied a warning issued by the French Embassy in N'Djamena that a group of rebels was making its way through the Batha Prefecture in central Chad. Chad insists that both rebel groups are supported by the Sudanese government.

=== International orphanage scandal ===
Nearly 100 children at the center of an international scandal that left them stranded at an orphanage in remote eastern Chad returned home after nearly five months March 14, 2008. The 97 children were taken from their homes in October 2007 by a then-obscure French charity, Zoé's Ark, which claimed they were orphans from Sudan's war-torn Darfur region.

=== Rebel attack on Ndjamena ===
On Friday, February 1, 2008, rebels, an opposition alliance of leaders Mahamat Nouri, a former defense minister, and Timane Erdimi, a nephew of Idriss Déby who was his chief of staff, attacked the Chadian capital of Ndjamena – even surrounding the Presidential Palace. But Idris Deby with government troops fought back. French forces flew in ammunition for Chadian government troops but took no active part in the fighting. UN has said that up to 20,000 people left the region, taking refuge in nearby Cameroon and Nigeria. Hundreds of people were killed, mostly civilians. The rebels accuse Deby of corruption and embezzling millions in oil revenue. While many Chadians may share that assessment, the uprising appears to be a power struggle within the elite that has long controlled Chad. The French government believes that the opposition has regrouped east of the capital. Déby has blamed Sudan for the current unrest in Chad.

=== Regional interventionism ===
During the Déby era Chad intervened in conflicts in Mali, Central African Republic, Niger and Nigeria.

In 2013, Chad sent 2000 men from its military to help France in Operation Serval during the Mali War. Later in the same year Chad sent 850 troops to Central African Republic to help peacekeeping operation MISCA, those troops withdrew in April 2014 after allegations of human rights violations.

During the Boko Haram insurgency, Chad multiple times sent troops to assist the fight against Boko Haram in Niger and Nigeria.

In August 2018, rebel fighters of the Military Command Council for the Salvation of the Republic (CCMSR) attacked government forces in northern Chad. Chad experienced threats from jihadists fleeing the Libyan conflict. Chad had been an ally of the West in the fight against Islamist militants in West Africa.

In January 2019, after 47 years, Chad restored diplomatic relations with Israel. It was announced during a visit to N’Djamena by Israeli Prime Minister Benjamin Netanyahu.

== Mahamat Déby era (2021–present) ==
In April 2021 Chad's army announced that President Idriss Déby had died of his injuries following clashes with rebels in the north of the country. Idriss Deby ruled the country for more than 30 years since 1990. It was also announced that a military council led by Déby's son, Mahamat Idriss Déby a 37-year-old four star general, will govern for the next 18 months. On May 23, 2024, Mahamat Idriss Déby was sworn in as President of Chad. He had won the disputed May 6 election outright, with 61 per cent of the vote.

== See also ==
- 2010 Sahel famine
- History of Africa
- List of heads of government of Chad
- List of heads of state of Chad
- List of human evolution fossils
- Politics of Chad
- Neolithic Subpluvial
- Timeline of Chad
