= Politics of Chad =

The politics of Chad take place in a framework of a semi-presidential republic, whereby the President of Chad is the head of state and the prime minister is the head of government. Executive power is exercised by the government. Legislative power is vested in both the government and parliament. Chad is one of the most corrupt countries in the world.

The first multi-party presidential elections and parliamentary elections in Chad were held in 1996 and 1997, respectively.

In May 2013, security forces in Chad foiled a coup against the President Idriss Deby that had been in preparation for several months. In April 2021, President Déby was injured by the rebel group Front Pour l'Alternance et La Concorde au Tchad (FACT). He succumbed to his injuries on April 20, 2021. His presidency was taken by his family member Mahamat Déby in April 2021. This resulted in both the National Assembly and Chadian Government being dissolved and replaced with a Transitional Military Council.

The National Transitional Council will oversee the transition to democracy. On 23 May 2024, Mahamat Idriss Déby was sworn in as President of Chad. He had won the disputed 6 May election outright, with 61 per cent of the vote.

== Executive branch ==
Main office-holders
Office	Name	Party	Since
President	Mahamat Déby	Patriotic Salvation Movement	20 April 2021

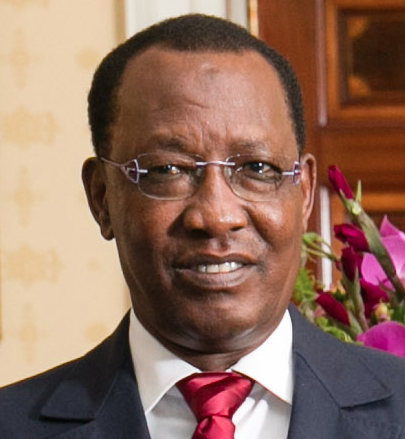
Former President Idriss Deby in 2014

Chad's executive branch is headed by the President and dominates the Chadian political system. Following the military overthrow of Hissène Habré in December 1990, Idriss Déby won the presidential elections in 1996 and 2001. The constitutional basis for the government is the 1996 constitution, under which the president was limited to two terms of office until Déby had that provision repealed in 2005. The president has the power to appoint the Council of State (or cabinet), and exercises considerable influence over appointments of judges, generals, provincial officials and heads of Chad's parastatal firms. In cases of grave and immediate threat, the president, in consultation with the National Assembly President and Council of State, may declare a state of emergency. Most of the key advisors for former president Déby were members of the Zaghawa clan, although some southern and opposition personalities were represented in his government.

== Legislative branch ==
According to the 1996 constitution, the National Assembly deputies are elected by universal suffrage for 4-year terms. The Assembly holds regular sessions twice a year, starting in March and October, and can hold special sessions as necessary and called by the prime minister. Deputies elect a president of the National Assembly every 2 years. Assembly deputies or members of the executive branch may introduce legislation; once passed by the Assembly, the president must take action to either sign or reject the law within 15 days. The National Assembly must approve the prime minister's plan of government and may force the prime minister to resign through a majority vote of no-confidence. However, if the National Assembly rejects the executive branch's program twice in one year, the president may disband the Assembly and call for new legislative elections. In practice, the president exercises considerable influence over the National Assembly through the MPS party structure.

== Judicial branch ==
Despite the constitution's guarantee of judicial independence from the executive branch, the president names most key judicial officials. The Supreme Court is made up of a chief justice, named by the president, and 15 councilors chosen by the president and National Assembly; appointments are for life. The Constitutional Council, with nine judges elected to 9-year terms, has the power to review all legislation, treaties and international agreements prior to their adoption. The constitution recognizes customary and traditional law in locales where it is recognized and to the extent it does not interfere with public order or constitutional guarantees of equality for all citizens.

== Political parties and elections ==
=== Presidential elections ===
Candidate	Party	Votes	%
Idriss Déby	Patriotic Salvation Movement	2,219,352	59.92
Saleh Kebzabo	National Union for Democracy and Renewal	473,074	12.77
Laoukein Kourayo Médard	Chadian Convention for Peace and Development	392,988	10.61
Djimrangar Dadnadji	CAP–SUR	186,857	5.04
Delwa Kassiré Koumakoye	National Rally for Development and Progress	73,636	1.99
Malloum Yoboide Djeraki	Independent	67,019	1.81
Mahamat Ahmat Alhabo	Party for Liberty and Development	58,533	1.58
Abdoulaye Mbodou Mbami	Independent	53,204	1.44
Clément Djimet Bagaou	Independent	48,471	1.31
Gali Ngothé Gatta	Independent	44,899	1.21
Brice Mbaimon Guedmbaye	Independent	36,647	0.99
Djividi Boukar	Independent	25,107	0.68
Julien Béassemda	Party for Integral Democracy and Independence	24,125	0.65
Total		3,703,912	100.00
Valid votes		3,703,912	89.82
Invalid/blank votes		419,818	10.18
Total votes		4,123,730	100.00
Registered voters/turnout		6,252,548	65.95
Source: Constitutional Court

=== Parliamentary elections ===
Party	Seats
Patriotic Salvation Movement	83
MPS–RDP	25
MPS–RNDP	18
National Union for Democracy and Renewal	10
MPS–RDP–RNDP	8
Union for Renewal and Democracy	8
National Rally for Democracy in Chad	8
Federation, Action for the Republic	4
UNDR–PLD	2
Democratic and Socialist Party for Alternation	2
Chadian Convention for Peace and Development	2
Union for Democracy and the Republic	2
ART–CNDS	1
MPDT–RDP/R–CNDS	1
PPJE–ART–CNDS	1
Chadian Democratic Union	1
National Action for Development	1
New Breath for the Republic	1
Rally of People for Democratic Alternation	1
Movement of Patriotic Chadians for the Republic	1
Democratic Party of the Chadian People	1
Union of Democratic Forces/Republican Party	1
Union of Chadian Ecologists	1
PDI–RPT	1
African Party for Peace and Social Justice	1
Party for Unity and Reconstruction	1
National Alliance for Democracy and Renewal	1
Union for the National Democratic Upsurge	1
Total	188
Source: EISA

== International organization participation ==
ACCT, ACP, AfDB, AU, BDEAC, CEMAC, FAO, FZ, G-77, IBRD, ICAO, ICCt, ICFTU, ICRM, IDA, IDB, IFAD, IFC, IFRCS, ILO, IMF, Interpol, IOC, ITU, MIGA, NAM, OIC, ONUB, OPCW, UN, UNCTAD, UNESCO, UNIDO, UNOCI, UPU, WCL, WHO, WIPO, WMO, WToO, WTrO

== 2021 government shakeup ==
On 20 April 2021, following the death of longtime Chad President Idriss Déby, the Military of Chad released a statement confirming that both the Government of Chad and the nation's National Assembly had been dissolved and that a Transitional Military Council led by Déby's son Mahamat would lead the nation for at least 18 months. Among the 40-member transitional government were nine women including Lydie Beassemda, Fatime Goukouni Weddeye and Isabelle Housna Kassire.

Following protests on 14 May 2022, the authorities in Chad detained several members of civil society organizations. The protests were organized in N’Djamena, and other cities across the country by Chadian civil society organizations, united under the coalition Wakit Tamma.

== See also ==
- Kamougue Assoum
