= Elections in Chad =

Chad holds elections on national level for a head of state – the president – and a legislature. The president is elected for a five-year term by the people. The National Assembly (Assemblée Nationale) has 155 members, elected for a four-year term in 25 single-member constituencies and 34 multi-member constituencies. Chad is a one party dominant state with the Patriotic Salvation Movement in power, although according to the African Union, elections in Chad are generally free and fair. Human Rights Watch, however, has criticized the election process in Chad, arguing that they have problems such as electoral fraud, multiple voting, underage voting, and low voter turnout.

== History of elections ==
Former president, Idriss Déby, seized power in 1990 through a rebellion. The second election of Déby was reported by international observers to be fraudulent. In 1997, parliamentary elections were held, with the MPS party of Déby winning 63 of the 125 seats existing at the time. International observers also claimed that these elections witnessed serious irregularities. In May 2001, Déby won the presidential election in the first round with 63% of the vote, but the election was considered to be fraudulent, and several opposition leaders were arrested after accusing the Chadian government of election fraud. Because of prominent electoral irregularities in the previous elections in 2001 and 2006, the 2011 presidential election was boycotted by the major opposition parties, which resulted in Déby winning 89% of the vote in the first round. Most recently, Déby was elected to his fifth term in 2016, after abolishing presidential term limits in 2004 by amending the Constitution of Chad. Kodi Mahamat Bam, President of the Independent National Electoral Commission announced the postponement of legislative elections to April 2021. The stated reason was related to COVID-19. On 20 April 2021 Idriss Déby was killed in battle against a group of rebels called FACT (the Front for Change and Concord in Chad). His son Mahamat Déby is now president.

== Latest elections ==
=== Presidential elections ===
Candidate	Party	Votes	%
Mahamat Déby	Patriotic Salvation Movement	3,777,279	61.00
Succès Masra	Les Transformateurs	1,148,245	18.54
Albert Pahimi Padacké	National Rally for Democracy in Chad	1,048,015	16.93
Lydie Beassemda	Party for Integral Democracy and Independence	59,632	0.96
Théophile Bongoro	Party for Rally and Equity in Chad	46,784	0.76
Alladoum Djarma	Chadian Socialist Action for Renewal	33,765	0.55
Brice Guedmbaye	Movement of Patriotic Chadians for the Republic	27,848	0.45
Yacine Abdramane Sakine	Reformist Party	22,328	0.36
Mansiri Lopsikréo	Les Élites	15,147	0.24
Nasra Djimasngar	A New Day	12,738	0.21
Total		6,191,781	100.00
Valid votes		6,191,781	99.62
Invalid/blank votes		23,463	0.38
Total votes		6,215,244	100.00
Registered voters/turnout		8,202,207	75.78
Source: Africa 24

=== Parliamentary elections ===
Provisional results were published on 12 January 2025, showing that the ruling Patriotic Salvation Movement party won 124 out of 188 seats on a voter turnout of 52%.

Party	Votes	%	Seats
Patriotic Salvation Movement	1,814,429	45.18	124
National Rally of Chadian Democrats	279,653	6.96	11
Rally for Democracy and Progress	242,821	6.05	8
National Union for Democracy and Renewal	156,758	3.90	7
Al Wassat	78,043	1.94	1
Reformist Party	72,344	1.80	1
Party for Liberty and Development	61,090	1.52	2
Movement for Unity and Renewal	50,439	1.26	1
Chadian Convention for Peace and Development	50,094	1.25	1
Union for the Refoundation of Chad	41,710	1.04	0
Chadian Democratic Union	41,258	1.03	1
Peace and Social Cohesion Party	38,948	0.97	3
Party for Liberty and Development/Reformist Party	38,814	0.97	1
Union for Renewal and Democracy	35,852	0.89	2
National Rally for Development and Progress	32,022	0.80	1
National Action for Development	28,985	0.72	1
Party for Integral Democracy and Independence	28,340	0.71	1
Movement of Chadian Patriots for the Republic	27,391	0.68	2
Party for Rally and Equity in Chad	26,649	0.66	1
Action for the Republic, Democracy and Development	26,159	0.65	1
Democratic and Socialist Party for Alternation	25,991	0.65	1
Movement for Democracy and Socialism in Chad	23,990	0.60	1
Popular Action Framework for Solidarity and Unity of the Republic	23,185	0.58	1
National People's Convention	22,560	0.56	0
National Movement for Change in Chad	20,878	0.52	1
Al Nassour	20,804	0.52	1
Union of Democratic and Republican Forces	19,254	0.48	1
AS	17,463	0.43	0
Chadian Socialist Action for Renewal	17,382	0.43	1
Les Elites	17,341	0.43	0
Union of Democratic Forces	15,416	0.38	1
Ensemble pour la République	15,028	0.37	0
Movement for Equality and Citizens' Rally	14,374	0.36	1
Gathering of the United Sons of Chad for Development	14,264	0.36	0
National Democratic and Social Convention	14,253	0.35	1
A New Day	13,665	0.34	1
Horizon Movement for Democracy	13,610	0.34	0
Party of Democrats and Socialists	13,579	0.34	1
Party of Democrats for Renewal	13,101	0.33	0
United Chad Party for Development	12,581	0.31	0
Chadian National Social Democratic Congress	12,293	0.31	0
Democratic Party of the Chadian People	12,110	0.30	1
Federation, Action for the Republic	11,684	0.29	0
National Democratic and Social Convention/Al Nassour	11,331	0.28	0
United People	10,801	0.27	0
New Breath for the Republic	10,573	0.26	0
Popular Front for Liberation	10,310	0.26	1
Rally for Progress and Social Justice	9,678	0.24	0
Dynamic Republican Alliance	9,403	0.23	1
Union of Resistance Forces	9,184	0.23	0
UPPP	8,484	0.21	0
Alliance 43	8,463	0.21	0
La Nouvelle Génération	8,032	0.20	0
Artisans of a New Chad	7,976	0.20	0
A Nation for All	7,735	0.19	0
Party for Unity and Reconstruction	7,351	0.18	0
Convention for Democracy and Federalism	7,059	0.18	0
African Democratic Party	6,969	0.17	0
Movement for the Renewal of Chad	6,805	0.17	0
RDR	6,739	0.17	0
People's Party for Change	6,583	0.16	0
Alliance for Democracy, Integrity and Freedom	6,562	0.16	0
AFR	6,486	0.16	0
Party for Unity and Democracy	6,456	0.16	0
National Alliance for Democracy and Change	6,430	0.16	0
National Action for Development/Renovated	6,286	0.16	0
Popular Front for the Federation	6,188	0.15	0
Union of Democrats for Development	6,155	0.15	0
Party for Democracy and Reconciliation in Chad	5,898	0.15	0
Party for Democratic Renewal in Chad	5,887	0.15	0
AFD	5,773	0.14	0
Al Wihda	5,571	0.14	0
Convergence for Social Democracy	5,498	0.14	0
Al Takhadoum	5,280	0.13	0
Nida Al Watan	5,122	0.13	0
Action for Renewal of Chad	4,957	0.12	0
Rally for the Republic – Lingui	4,754	0.12	0
Popular Front for the Liberation of the South	4,716	0.12	0
Socialist Party of Chad	4,689	0.12	1
Les Leaders	4,456	0.11	1
March for the Reestablishment of Harmony	4,395	0.11	0
Union of the Chadian People for National Reconciliation	4,203	0.10	0
Movement for Rally and Justice	4,121	0.10	0
People's Party for the Strengthening of Democracy	3,999	0.10	0
Al Djamaa	3,953	0.10	0
Liberal Party for the Emancipation and Progress of Chad	3,750	0.09	0
Citizen in Search of Happiness	3,729	0.09	0
National Democratic Union for Change	3,659	0.09	0
RA (Rally for Democracy and Progress/Action for Renewal of Chad)	3,556	0.09	0
MPD	3,440	0.09	0
UPPP/FORT	3,432	0.09	0
Party for Democracy and Social Justice	3,367	0.08	0
Party for Justice and Freedom	3,325	0.08	0
Rally of the People of Chad	3,175	0.08	0
Chadian Progressive Party	3,161	0.08	0
UNDR/Chadian Social Democrats Front	3,150	0.08	0
Party for the Development and Continuity of Chad	3,111	0.08	0
PPST	2,870	0.07	0
RARE	2,841	0.07	0
Le Republicain	2,742	0.07	0
Movement for the National Reconstruction of Chad	2,712	0.07	0
Emergence for the Development of Chad	2,633	0.07	0
CAP SUR/Rally for the Republic – Lingui	2,633	0.07	0
Chadian Alliance for Development	2,571	0.06	1
Radiodiffusion Nationale Tchadienne	2,549	0.06	0
People's Party for Freedom	2,522	0.06	0
Youth Movement for Economic and Social Recovery	2,491	0.06	0
Alliance of Resistant Democrats	2,490	0.06	0
Les Serviteurs	2,473	0.06	0
Party for National Unity, Democracy, Dialogue and Development of Chad	2,470	0.06	0
People's Party for Democratic Change	2,460	0.06	0
Attayar Al-Islahi	2,417	0.06	0
Union for Democracy, Development and Justice in Chad	2,406	0.06	0
National Salvation Movement of Chad	2,383	0.06	0
National Demobilization and Reintegration Program	2,364	0.06	0
Ensemble pour le 9ème	2,322	0.06	0
Patriotic Front for Democracy	2,304	0.06	0
National Convergence for the Salvation of the People	2,291	0.06	0
Mojes	2,266	0.06	0
Chadian Party for Renewal and Development	2,221	0.06	0
Union of Progressive Workers for Cohesion	2,194	0.05	0
nouvelle generation pol	2,177	0.05	0
African Democratic Movement	2,161	0.05	0
Tawafouk	2,123	0.05	0
Chadian Action for Unity and Socialism	2,120	0.05	0
Union for Democracy and the Republic/Social Democratic Party	2,021	0.05	0
Union for the National Democratic Upsurge	2,001	0.05	0
Popular Movement for Reform	1,984	0.05	0
Union for Peace and Democracy	1,954	0.05	0
National Convention for Peace and Development in Chad/Action	1,946	0.05	0
Citizens Party of Chad	1,912	0.05	0
Federation, Action for the Republic Bis	1,853	0.05	0
MCC	1,830	0.05	0
New Vision	1,824	0.05	0
Alliance Baobab	1,797	0.04	0
CNAD	1,794	0.04	0
RDDP	1,738	0.04	0
Revolutionary Movement for Democracy and Peace	1,711	0.04	0
People's Alliance for the Republic/Trompette	1,677	0.04	0
Party for Democratic Development and Freedoms	1,661	0.04	0
People's Movement for Justice and Equality	1,625	0.04	0
People's Movement for Alternation	1,614	0.04	0
Rally for Justice and the Environment	1,571	0.04	0
Generation Consciente	1,557	0.04	0
Les Refondeurs	1,529	0.04	0
People's Movement for Democracy in Chad	1,510	0.04	0
National Movement for Democracy and Alternation in Chad	1,443	0.04	0
Socialist Alliance for Integral Renewal	1,441	0.04	0
Chadian People's Liberation Party	1,438	0.04	0
Rally of Nationalists for Democracy and Development	1,418	0.04	0
People's Alliance for the Republic	1,389	0.03	0
Chadian Union for Renaissance	1,380	0.03	0
Party of Chadian Socialist Intellectuals for Evolution	1,360	0.03	0
RDT/C	1,324	0.03	0
CSDT	1,304	0.03	0
The Reformers	1,278	0.03	0
Party for Reform and Economic Independence	1,264	0.03	0
National Movement for Reconstruction/Democratic Rally	1,215	0.03	0
Rally for Democracy and Socialism in Chad	1,096	0.03	0
Rally for Democracy and Progress/Renewed	1,060	0.03	0
New Breath for the Republic/Popular Movement for Reform	1,014	0.03	0
Popular Party for Social Justice/Workers Front for the Redemption of Chad	995	0.02	0
MJL	994	0.02	0
Party for National Unity, Dialogue and Democracy	945	0.02	0
Union of Forces for Change and Justice	921	0.02	0
Social Democratic Party	898	0.02	0
Chadian Democratic Party	884	0.02	0
Rally of People for Democratic Alternation	872	0.02	0
Alliance of the Forces of Progress	836	0.02	0
Union for the Democratic Republic of Chad	803	0.02	0
Popular Party for Justice and Equality	730	0.02	0
UFDD/F1	702	0.02	0
Movement for Democracy and Justice in Chad	566	0.01	0
Movement for Freedom, Peace and Renewal in Chad	476	0.01	0
PPDST	419	0.01	0
PCDD	403	0.01	0
Communist Party of Work to the People of Chad	385	0.01	0
Movement of Upright and Democratic Citizens	264	0.01	0
ASR	175	0.00	0
Movement for Justice and Peace in Chad	165	0.00	0
African Socialist Movement/Renewed	57	0.00	0
National Union	20	0.00	0
Total	4,016,020	100.00	188
Valid votes	4,016,020	95.05	
Invalid/blank votes	209,294	4.95	
Total votes	4,225,314	100.00	
Registered voters/turnout	8,066,326	52.38	
