= 1997 Chadian parliamentary election =

- 5 January 1997 (first round); 23 February 1997 (second round)
- All 125 seats in the National Assembly; 63 seats needed for a majority
Party	Leader	Vote %	Seats
MPS	Idriss Déby	39.96	65
URD	Wadel Abdelkader Kamougué	13.13	29
RDP	Lol Mahamat Choua	6.69	3
UNDR	Saleh Kebzabo	6.04	15
FAR	Ngarlejy Yorongar	4.01	1
UDR	Jean Alingué Bawoyeu	3.88	4
PLD	Ibni Oumar Mahamat Saleh	2.64	3
AND		1.63	2
CNDS	Adoum Moussa Seif	1.58	1
ACTUS	Fidèle Moungar	0.15	2
This lists parties that won seats. See the complete results below.

Parliamentary elections were held in Chad on 5 January 1997, with a second round on 23 February. They were the first multi-party elections since independence in 1960 and resulted in a victory for the ruling Patriotic Salvation Movement (MPS), which won 65 of the 125 seats in the National Assembly. However, the elections were marred by electoral fraud, including widespread vote rigging, as with the 1996 presidential elections.

== Background ==
The previous parliamentary elections had been held in 1990, officially on a non-partisan basis, but the Chadian constitution ensured single-party rule under President Hissène Habré's National Union for Independence and Revolution party. However, after a few months, Idriss Déby and the Patriotic Salvation Movement (MPS) overthrew Habré's government in a coup. The National Assembly and constitution were both suspended as a result.

The 1997 elections represented a culmination of the slow ongoing post-coup democratization process. Other political parties were approved in 1992. A conference to draft a constitution began in 1993, and the new constitution was approved in a 1996 referendum, and a multi-party presidential election was held a few months later, with Déby and the MPS winning. The elections were the first multi-party parliamentary election in Chad since independence, and the first since the last pre-independence elections in 1959.

== Electoral system ==
The elections were held using the two round system. Candidates had to win a majority of the vote in the first round to be elected. In constituencies where no candidate received a majority, a second round was held. The members of the National Assembly were elected to four-year terms.

== Campaign ==
A total of 30 parties contested the elections, putting forward 656 candidates. The parties receiving over 5% of the overall vote share were:

- Patriotic Salvation Movement (MPS; French: Mouvement Patriotique du Salut) was led by President Idriss Déby and presented itself as a "guarnator of the democratic process". It was originally a coalition of rebel groups that successfully launched the 1990 Chadian coup d'état, and developed into the ruling party. In the parliamentary elections, most of its support came from northern Chad.
- Union for Renewal and Democracy (URD; French: Union pour le Rénouveau et la Démocratie) was led by Wadel Abdelkader Kamougué, a general from southern Chad, and its support came largely from the Sara people and workers in the south of the country.
- Rally for Democracy and Progress (RDP; French: Rassemblement pour la Démocratie et le Progrès) was led by Lol Mahamat Choua, who had served as President in 1979. The party called for army reform to stabilize the Chadian political sphere, and relied on support from businesspeople in the western parts of the country.
- National Union for Democracy and Renewal (UNDR; French: Union Nationale pour la Démocratie et le Renouveau) was led by Saleh Kebzabo, a journalist and politician from the south. The party campaigned on a libertarian platform calling for the decentralization of government functions and relied on support across ethnic and religious groups.

== Results ==
Party	First round		Second round		Total seats
Party	Votes	%	Votes	%	Total seats
Patriotic Salvation Movement	504,045	39.96	262,060	34.40	65
Union for Renewal and Democracy	165,639	13.13	214,548	28.16	29
Rally for Democracy and Progress	84,372	6.69	13,140	1.72	3
National Union for Democracy and Renewal	76,156	6.04	63,549	8.34	15
Federation, Action for the Republic	50,627	4.01	32,274	4.24	1
Union for Democracy and the Republic	48,948	3.88	2,419	0.32	4
Party for Liberty and Development	33,344	2.64			3
Union for Democratic Reform	25,603	2.03	18,764	2.46	0
Movement for Democracy and Socialism in Chad	21,874	1.73	25,764	3.38	0
National Rally for Development and Progress	20,630	1.64	18,345	2.41	0
National Action for Development	20,572	1.63	14,732	1.93	2
National Democratic and Social Convention	19,899	1.58	33,574	4.41	1
Convention for Democracy	15,226	1.21			0
Convention of Social-Democratic Chadians	15,223	1.21			0
Party for Unity and National Reconstruction	14,909	1.18	1,731	0.23	0
PLUS	14,488	1.15			0
National Union	14,274	1.13	17,133	2.25	0
African Party for Progress and Social Justice	12,875	1.02			0
National Democratic Rally of Chad	9,380	0.74			0
National Union for Democracy and Progress	8,847	0.70			0
Social Movement for Democracy in Chad	8,611	0.68			0
Union of Democratic Forces	8,252	0.65			0
Movement for Democracy in Chad	7,026	0.56			0
National Party of Democratic Renewal	6,355	0.50			0
Rally for Progress and Social Justice	6,282	0.50			0
National Union for the Renewal of Chad	6,242	0.49			0
National Rally for Democracy in Africa	5,722	0.45			0
Democratic Union for the Progress of Chad	5,186	0.41			0
Action for Renewal of Chad	4,666	0.37			0
Chadian Democratic Union	4,324	0.34			0
Chadian People's Rally	3,891	0.31			0
Rally of Nationalist Chadians	2,516	0.20			0
National Movement of Democratic Renovators	2,516	0.20			0
National Union Party for Democracy, Dialogue and Development of Chad	2,146	0.17			0
Rally for the Republic – Lingui	2,096	0.17	18,389	2.41	0
Chadian Action for Unity and Socialism	1,915	0.15	19,878	2.61	2
Rally of Democratic Forces in Chad	1,502	0.12			0
Social-Democratic Party of Chad	1,417	0.11	5,595	0.73	0
Democratic Rally of Chad	1,172	0.09			0
Republican Front	678	0.05			0
Movement for Unity and Democracy in Chad	663	0.05			0
Democratic Party of Chad	453	0.04			0
National Union for Democracy and Development	380	0.03			0
Committee of National Revival for Peace and Democracy	354	0.03			0
Total	1,261,296	100.00	761,895	100.00	125
Valid votes	1,261,296	92.22	761,895	96.78	
Invalid/blank votes	106,391	7.78	25,378	3.22	
Total votes	1,367,687	100.00	787,273	100.00	
Registered voters/turnout	3,248,333	42.10	1,733,931	45.40	
Source: Nohlen et al.

== Aftermath ==
Voting patterns largely followed regional lines, with the MPS dominant in the northern, central, and eastern parts of Chad, and the URD holding power in the south. The newly elected National Assembly was opened on 4 April. A government was formed with Nassour Guelendouksia Ouaido as Prime Minister on 21 May.
