= 2011 Chadian parliamentary election =

- 13 February 2011
- All 188 seats in the National Assembly; 95 seats needed for a majority
Party	Leader	Seats	+/–
MPS–RDP–RNDP	Haroun Kabadi	134	+6
UNDR–PLD	Saleh Kebzabo	12	+7
RNDT–Le Réveil	Albert Pahimi Padacké	8	+7
URD	Wadel Abdelkader Kamougué	8	+5
FAR	Ngarlejy Yorongar	4	−6
CTPD		2	New
PDSA	Malloum Yoboïde Djekari	2	New
UDR	Jean Alingué Bawoyeu	2	+2
PAP-JS	Valentin Néatobeye Bidi	1	+1
ART–CNDS–PPJE	Oumar Boukar	2	0
UDT	Abderaman Koulamallah	1	+1
PDPT		1	New
MTPR		1	+1
MPDT–RDP/R–CNDS	Mahamat Abdoulaye	1	0
AND	Salibou Garba	1	+1
ANDR	Josué Djïkornondï Tapambaye	1	New
SONOR	Kosmadji Merci	1	New
PUR		1	+1
PDI–RPT	Djébaret Julien Beassemda	1	+1
RAPAD	Nobo N'Djibo	1	New
USND		1	New
UET/Les Verts	Badono Daigou	1	New
UFD/PR	Gali Ngothé Gatta	1	+1
This lists parties that won seats. See the complete results below.

Parliamentary elections were held in Chad on 13 February 2011, the first such elections since 2002. They were initially scheduled for 28 November 2010 but were postponed in September of that year. The National Independent Electoral Commission attributed the two-month delay to complications encountered during the preparation process.

President Idriss Déby came to power in 1990 through a coup. His party, the Patriotic Salvation Movement (MPS), won nearly three-quarters of parliamentary seats in the 2002 elections, which observers widely regarded as flawed. Since Déby's rise to power, opposition parties and civil society groups have repeatedly disputed the outcomes of Chadian elections.

In August 2007, the MPS and opposition parties reached an agreement, under the auspices of the European Union, to govern the organisation of the 2011 parliamentary and presidential elections. The agreement outlined the creation of a new electoral commission with equal representation from the ruling party and the opposition. It also established specific electoral procedures, including provisions for members of the Chadian security forces to cast their ballots a day early so they could be deployed on election day to maintain order. The agreement was initially viewed as a step toward improving transparency and reducing vote rigging by ensuring that most ballots would be cast on election day.

However, international observers and opposition leaders stated prior to the elections that another victory for the MPS was highly likely.

The MPS-led coalition retained its majority in the National Assembly, winning 134 of the 188 seats. The presidential election was subsequently held on 25 April 2011, in which Déby was re-elected.

== Background ==
On 13 August 2007, the ruling Patriotic Salvation Movement (MPS) of President Idriss Déby, its allies, and most opposition parties signed an agreement after six months of negotiations concerning the organisation of the election. Under the agreement, an electoral census would be conducted and an improved electoral register would be created. A new 31-member independent electoral commission, composed of equal numbers of representatives from the ruling majority and the opposition, and chaired by a mutually agreed-upon president, would also be established.

The agreement additionally provided for the introduction of single ballots, for security forces to vote one day before the general population, and for nomadic populations to vote on election day rather than beforehand, as had been the case previously. The agreement also included provisions for opposition participation in the government. To allow for its implementation, the election was postponed until 2009 and the mandate of the current National Assembly was extended accordingly. Déby described the agreement as a step towards peace. In total, 87 parties signed the agreement; the only major opposition party that did not sign was the Federation, Action for the Republic (FAR).

FAR President Ngarlejy Yorongar criticised the agreement as insufficient, describing its signing as a "waste of time." He argued that a comprehensive dialogue involving all political actors—including rebels, exiled opposition figures, and civil society—was necessary, and maintained that a credible election could not take place while rebellion persisted in parts of the country. Yorongar also expressed concern that the independent electoral commission would remain subordinate to the Constitutional Council, which he alleged was controlled by Déby, and objected to the government overseeing the electoral census instead of the commission.

A committee to oversee implementation of the agreement was subsequently established, headed by Lol Mahamat Choua, President of the Rally for Democracy and Progress opposition party. During the battle between government forces and rebels in N'Djamena in February 2008, several opposition leaders, including Choua, were arrested, leading some opposition members to question the future of the agreement.

Following these arrests, the Coordination of Political Parties for the Defence of the Constitution (CPDC)—a coalition whose leader, Ibni Oumar Mahamat Saleh, was among those detained—suspended its participation in the follow-up committee.

Approximately 4.8 million citizens were registered to vote, representing around two-fifths of the population.

== Campaign ==
=== Patriotic Salvation Movement ===
President Déby stated regarding the elections that "everyone has something to win. A greater presence of the opposition will only increase the credibility [of the government]".

=== Opposition ===
The opposition consisted of more than one hundred small parties, most of which were underfunded and highly fragmented. The main opposition coalition was the Coordination of Political Parties for the Defence of the Constitution (CPDC), an umbrella group comprising 20 parties, four of which held seats in the then-current parliament.

In the lead-up to the elections, the CPDC accused the government of monopolising state media and criticised what it described as "the interference of officials at all levels in the electoral process on the one hand, and the overuse of means and assets of the state for electioneering".

== Conduct ==
In N'Djamena, President Déby called on all citizens to fulfil their civic duty and choose their representatives in the national parliament.

Both the European Union (EU) and the African Union (AU) sent electoral observers to monitor the vote. The EU mission reported that it had found no evidence of fraud. Louis Michel, head of the EU observer mission, stated: "From our observations, we have not seen any irregularities specifically aimed at fraud". He noted that "in some polling stations there is a lack of material and organisation," but added that "these are fair, democratic and transparent elections." Michel also commented on the overall atmosphere: "The mood is good and peaceful. There is no violence".

== Results ==
The Patriotic Salvation Movement (MPS), led by President Déby, won 110 of the 188 parliamentary seats, securing a majority. An additional 21 seats were won by allied parties, giving Déby's supporters an absolute majority. The results were viewed as an indication of strong support for Déby ahead of the presidential election scheduled for April.

A total of sixteen parties won at least one seat. The most successful opposition party was the National Union for Democracy and Renewal, led by Saleh Kebzabo, which won 11 seats.

Party	Seats
Patriotic Salvation Movement	83
MPS–RDP	25
MPS–RNDP	18
National Union for Democracy and Renewal	10
MPS–RDP–RNDP	8
Union for Renewal and Democracy	8
National Rally for Democracy in Chad	8
Federation, Action for the Republic	4
UNDR–PLD	2
Democratic and Socialist Party for Alternation	2
Chadian Convention for Peace and Development	2
Union for Democracy and the Republic	2
ART–CNDS	1
MPDT–RDP/R–CNDS	1
PPJE–ART–CNDS	1
Chadian Democratic Union	1
National Action for Development	1
New Breath for the Republic	1
Rally of People for Democratic Alternation	1
Movement of Patriotic Chadians for the Republic	1
Democratic Party of the Chadian People	1
Union of Democratic Forces/Republican Party	1
Union of Chadian Ecologists	1
PDI–RPT	1
African Party for Peace and Social Justice	1
Party for Unity and Reconstruction	1
National Alliance for Democracy and Renewal	1
Union for the National Democratic Upsurge	1
Total	188
Source: EISA
