= 2011 Chadian presidential election =

Third re-election of Idriss Déby

- 25 April 2011
- Registered: 4,950,976
- Turnout: 64.22% (▲11.14pp)
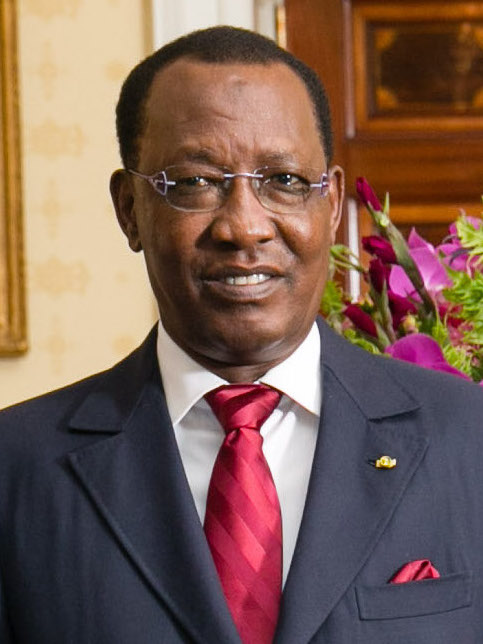

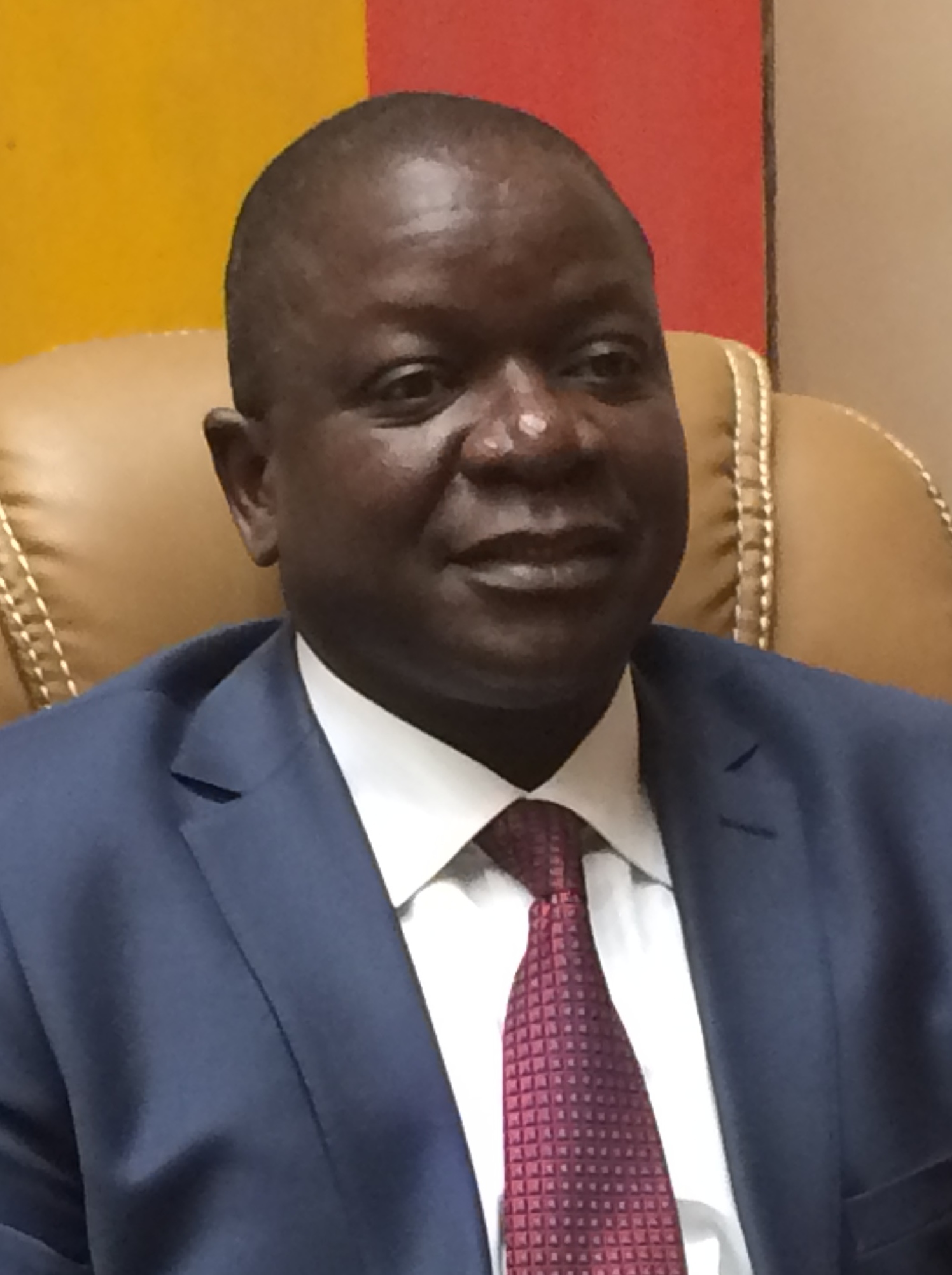

Candidate	Idriss Déby	Albert Pahimi Padacké	Nadji Madou
Party	MPS	RNDT–Le Réveil	ASRI
Popular vote	2,503,813	170,182	150,220
Percentage	88.66%	6.03%	5.32%
President before election
Idriss Déby
MPS
Elected President
Idriss Déby
MPS

Presidential elections were held in Chad on 25 April 2011, after being postponed from 3 April.

== Campaign ==
On 25 March 2011, the deputy spokesman of the opposition coalition, Saleh Kebzabo of the National Union for Democracy and Renewal, announced that "the coalition of political parties have decided to suspend their participation in the electoral commission." Fifteen opposition party-affiliated members of the election commission resigned, posing a threat to the credibility of the elections. According to Chad's electoral code, the electoral commission must have at least two-thirds of its 31 members to constitute a quorum.

=== Boycott ===
The major opposition politicians Kebzabo, Wadel Abdelkader Kamougué of the Union for Renewal and Democracy, and Ngarlejy Yorongar of the Federation, Action for the Republic, announced that they would boycott the "election circus" and urged voters to do so as well. Their announcement followed demands for electoral reforms including the issue of new voter identification cards. They also claimed unfair conditions led to a loss in the February 2011 parliamentary elections and that the presidential election would be a "historic fraud."

== Conduct ==
Voting stations were reported to have opened late in N'Djamena because of a delay in the arrival of voting materials and staff.

== Results ==
Candidate	Party	Votes	%
Idriss Déby	Patriotic Salvation Movement	2,503,813	88.66
Albert Pahimi Padacké	National Rally for Democracy in Chad	170,182	6.03
Nadji Madou	Socialist Alliance for Integral Renewal	150,220	5.32
Total		2,824,215	100.00
Valid votes		2,824,215	88.83
Invalid/blank votes		355,111	11.17
Total votes		3,179,326	100.00
Registered voters/turnout		4,950,976	64.22
Source: Psephos
