= 2021 Chadian presidential election =

Fifth re-election of Idriss Déby

- 11 April 2021
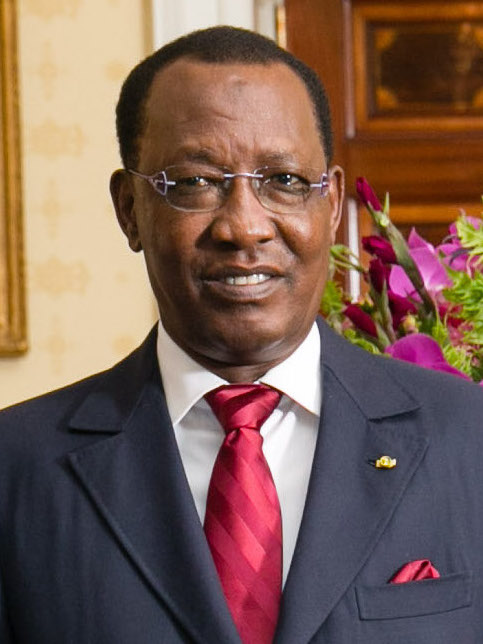

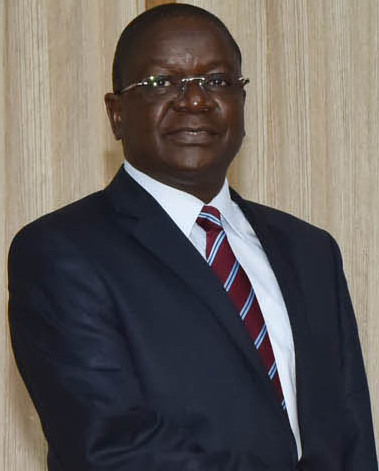
| Candidate | Idriss Déby | Albert Pahimi Padacké |
| Party | MPS | RNDT–Le Réveil |
| Popular vote | 3,663,431 | 476,464 |
| Percentage | 79.32% | 10.32% |
President before election
Idriss Déby
MPS
Elected President
Idriss Déby (killed in action)
Mahamat Déby seizes power as CMT President

Presidential elections were held in Chad on 11 April 2021. Incumbent Idriss Déby, who served five consecutive terms since seizing power in the 1990 coup d'état, was running for a sixth. Déby was described as an authoritarian by several international media sources, and as "strongly entrenched". During previous elections, he forbade the citizens of Chad from making posts online, and while Chad's total ban on social media use was lifted in 2019, restrictions continue to exist.

Provisional results released on April 19 showed that Déby won reelection with 79% of the vote. However, on 20 April it was announced by the military that Déby had been killed in action while leading his country's troops in a battle against rebels calling themselves the Front for Change and Concord in Chad (FACT).

Following Déby's death, a body called the Transitional Military Council – led by his son Mahamat Déby Itno, dissolved the government and the legislature, and proclaimed that it would be assuming power for a period of 18 months. Thereafter, a new presidential election would be held. Some political actors within Chad have labeled the installing of the transitional military government a "coup", as the constitutional provisions regarding the filling of a presidential vacancy were not followed. Namely, according to the constitution, the President of the National Assembly, Haroun Kabadi, should have been named Acting President after Déby's death, and an early election called within a period of no less than 45 and no more than 90 days from the time of the vacancy.

== Background ==
=== Electoral system ===
In the electoral system introduced in 1996, the President of Chad is elected to a five-year term using a two-round system, with an absolute majority required to prevent a second round of voting. In the 2016 election, 23 candidates submitted their applications to run for the presidency, including incumbent Idriss Déby; one of the opposition's most prominent members, Ngarlejy Yorongar, was prevented from running due to "administrative irregularities". On the day of the 2016 election, mobile internet, fixed internet connections and SMS messaging were cut. Many foreign TV operators could not cover the post-election scene, as their filming licenses were not renewed. The French broadcaster TV5Monde had their equipment confiscated, and their crew were held for several hours for filming at a polling station. On 21 April 2016, the electoral commission claimed that Déby had received 61.56% of the vote (and that Saleh Kebzabo, who placed second, had received 12.80%). The Constitutional Council validated the results on 4 May 2016, dismissing a joint appeal from opposition candidates on the technical grounds that it "could not review appeals submitted jointly". The final results issued by the court showed Déby with 59.92% of the vote and Kebzabo with 12.77%.

=== Human rights context ===
According to Amnesty International, pretrial detentions, systematic bans on gatherings, and attempts to prevent the free exchange of information were rampant in Chad in the leadup to the 2021 elections; they called for the release of activists and others arrested for "disturbing public order". Déby insists that the COVID-19 pandemic and misinformation are more rampant, and that he is simply cracking down on misinformation about the pandemic. He claimed in a speech that, instead of posting "authentic and verified" information, social media users engaged in "disinformation and manipulation, thus sowing doubt, panic and psychosis." He further expressed the necessity of defending democracy by opposing "hate speech and divisiveness".

== Predictions ==
The Africa Center for Strategic Studies stated that the presidential election was "expected to be a largely ceremonial affair given the highly limited space for the political opposition to operate". Columnist Stephen Kafeero agreed, focusing on the incumbent president's role, writing for Quartz Africa: "Chad is a classic example of what elections under authoritarian regimes often look like. There is limited space for competition against the interests of the incumbent Idriss Déby who has a firm grip on all branches of government and other key stakeholders like the media."

== Date ==
The election took place (as planned) on 11 April 2021.

On the same day, a group of armed rebels, the Front for Change and Concord in Chad (FACT), took over garrisons in the north of Chad. Government authorities stated on 17 April that they had destroyed one of the rebels' columns and were seeking the other rebels. One day later, Déby died while visiting troops, having sustained injuries in clashes with rebels.

After the death of his father, Mahamat Déby Itno formed the Transitional Military Council with the support of France, which said that it was needed under "extraordinary circumstances" to stabilize the country. Protests later erupted to ask for a civilian transition.

== Provisional results ==
Provisional results released on April 19 showed that incumbent president Idriss Déby won reelection with 79.3% of the vote.

| Candidate | Party | Votes | % |
|---|---|---|---|
| Idriss Déby | Patriotic Salvation Movement | 3,663,431 | 79.32 |
| Albert Pahimi Padacké | National Rally for Democracy in Chad | 476,464 | 10.32 |
| Lydie Beassemda | Party for Integral Democracy and Independence | 145,867 | 3.16 |
| Félix Romadoumngar Nialbé | Union for Renewal and Democracy | 87,722 | 1.90 |
| Brice Guedmbaye | Movement of Patriotic Chadians for the Republic | 64,540 | 1.40 |
| Baltazar Alladoum Djarma | Chadian Socialist Action for Renewal | 59,965 | 1.30 |
| Saleh Kebzabo | National Union for Democracy and Renewal | 47,518 | 1.03 |
| Théophile Bongoro | Party for Rally and Equity in Chad | 34,610 | 0.75 |
| Théophile Yombombé | Union of Progressive Workers for Cohesion | 19,923 | 0.43 |
| Ngarlejy Yorongar | Federation, Action for the Republic | 18,693 | 0.40 |
| Total | | 4,618,733 | 100.00 |
Source: CENI
