= 2016 Chadian presidential election =

Fourth re-election of Idriss Déby

- 10 April 2016
- Registered: 6,252,548
- Turnout: 65.95% (▲1.73pp)
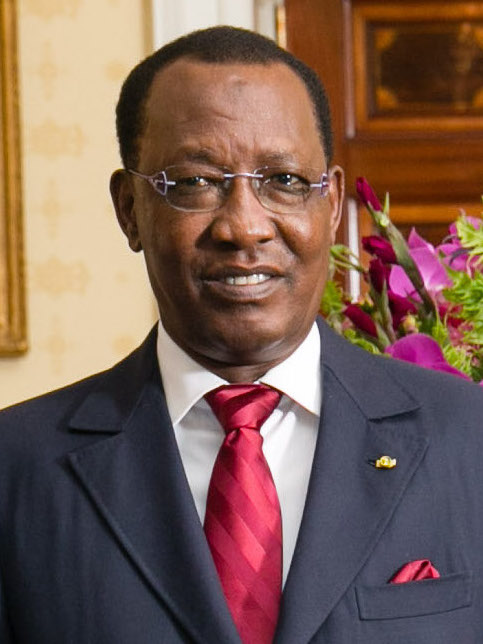

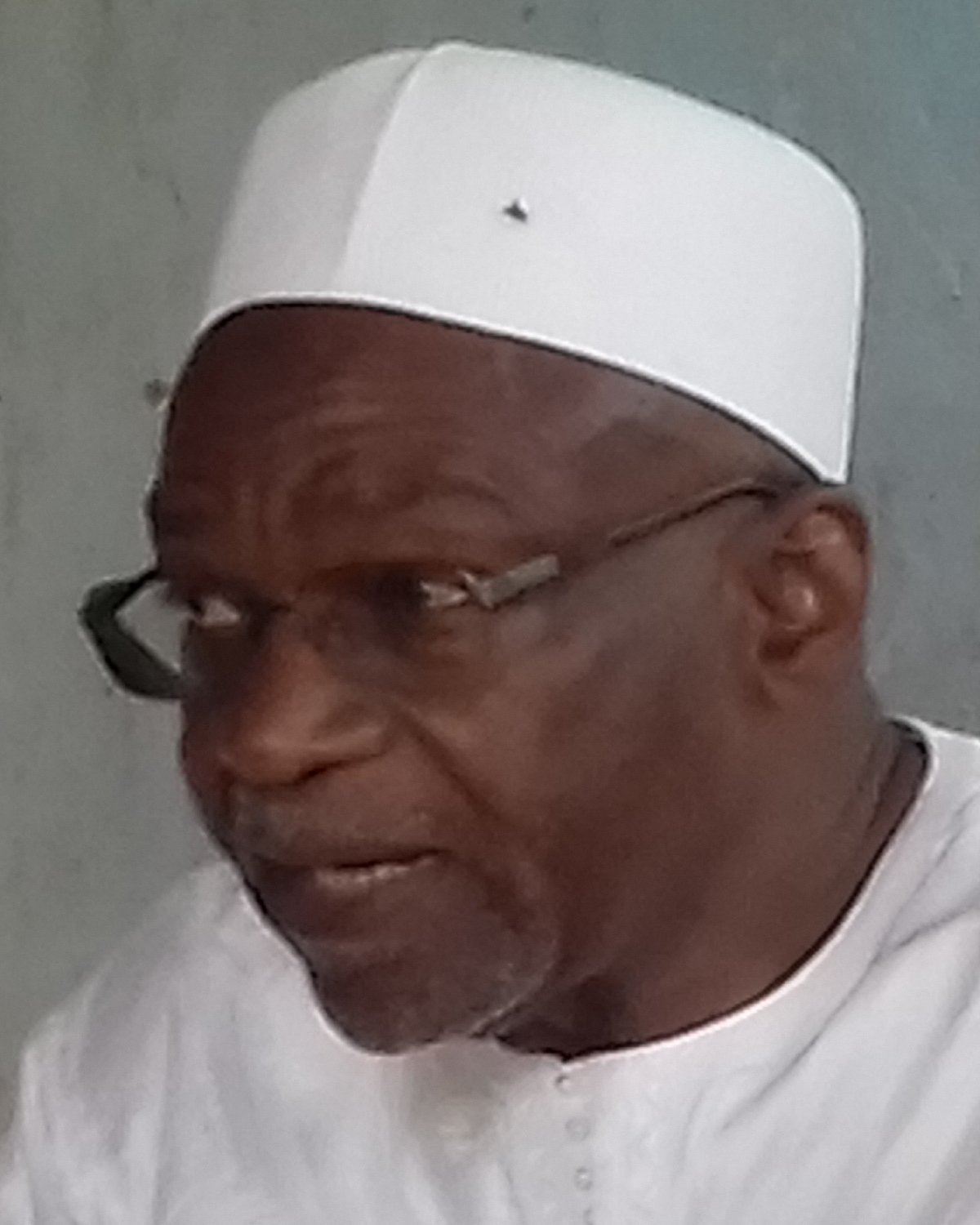

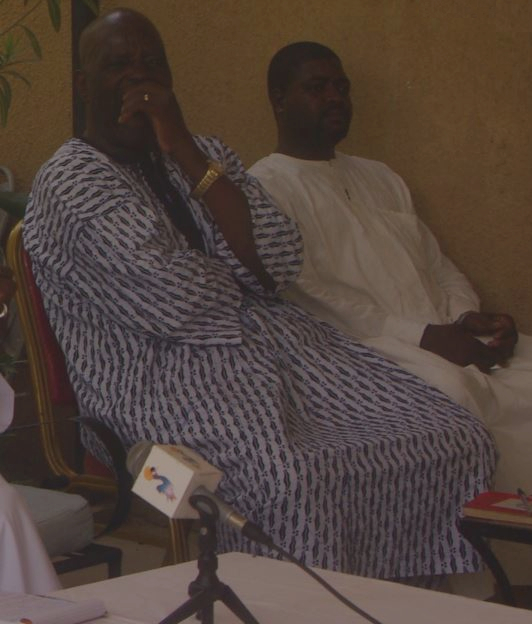
Candidate	Idriss Déby	Saleh Kebzabo
Party	MPS	UNDR
Popular vote	2,219,352	473,074
Percentage	59.92%	12.77%
Candidate	Laoukein Kourayo Médard	Djimrangar Dadnadji
Party	CTPD	CAP–SUR
Popular vote	392,988	186,857
Percentage	10.61%	5.04%
President before election
Idriss Déby
MPS
Elected President
Idriss Déby
MPS

Presidential elections were held in Chad on 10 April 2016. Incumbent President Idriss Déby was re-elected for a fifth term.

== Background ==
In the electoral system introduced in 1996, the President of Chad is elected to a five-year term using a two-round system, with an absolute majority required to prevent a second round of voting. 23 candidates submitted their applications to run for the presidency. President Idriss Déby ran for a fifth term in office and was expected to win. One of the opposition's most prominent members, Ngarlejy Yorongar, was prevented from running due to administrative irregularities.

== Conduct ==
Chad's opposition led a large-scale nationwide shutdown on 24 February 2016 to protest Déby's continuing 26-year tenure. The nationwide strike brought many of Chad's towns and the capital N'Djamena to a halt with markets, schools, transport, district centers and various operations shut down. It was the sixth major protest against Déby since the beginning of the year and various residents in N'Djamena claimed that it was the largest protest ever against the President. The campaign was run under the slogan "Ça Suffit", French for "That's enough".

On the day of the election mobile internet, fixed internet connections and SMS messaging were cut. Furthermore, many foreign TV operators could not cover the post election scene as their filming licenses were not renewed. French broadcaster, TV5Monde had their equipment confiscated and their crew were held for several hours for filming at a polling station.

== Results ==
Results announced by the electoral commission on 21 April 2016 showed Déby winning in the first round of voting with 61.56% of the vote. All of the other candidates trailed far behind. Long-time opposition leader Saleh Kebzabo, who placed second, was credited with 12.80% of the vote.

The Constitutional Council validated the results on 4 May 2016, dismissing a joint appeal from opposition candidates, who alleged irregularities, on the technical grounds that it could not review appeals submitted jointly. The final results issued by the court showed Déby with 59.92% of the vote and Kebzabo with 12.77%.

Candidate	Party	Votes	%
Idriss Déby	Patriotic Salvation Movement	2,219,352	59.92
Saleh Kebzabo	National Union for Democracy and Renewal	473,074	12.77
Laoukein Kourayo Médard	Chadian Convention for Peace and Development	392,988	10.61
Djimrangar Dadnadji	CAP–SUR	186,857	5.04
Delwa Kassiré Koumakoye	National Rally for Development and Progress	73,636	1.99
Malloum Yoboide Djeraki	Independent	67,019	1.81
Mahamat Ahmat Alhabo	Party for Liberty and Development	58,533	1.58
Abdoulaye Mbodou Mbami	Independent	53,204	1.44
Clément Djimet Bagaou	Independent	48,471	1.31
Gali Ngothé Gatta	Independent	44,899	1.21
Brice Mbaimon Guedmbaye	Independent	36,647	0.99
Djividi Boukar	Independent	25,107	0.68
Julien Béassemda	Party for Integral Democracy and Independence	24,125	0.65
Total		3,703,912	100.00
Valid votes		3,703,912	89.82
Invalid/blank votes		419,818	10.18
Total votes		4,123,730	100.00
Registered voters/turnout		6,252,548	65.95
Source: Constitutional Court

Déby was sworn in for his new term on 8 August 2016 at a ceremony in N'Djamena.

== Reactions ==
The African Union, of which Déby is the current chairperson, declared that the election was carried out "without fraud" despite various discrepancies in the electoral process. The report stated that various polling station staff were under-trained and of all the ballot boxes observed, 81% of the ballot boxes were not checked to see if they were empty at the start of the polling. Furthermore, 10% of the polling stations did not provide secrecy in voting; however, the elections were peaceful and concluded fairly.

Runner-up Saleh Kebzabo refused to accept the outcome of the vote, stating that it was an "electoral stick-up." Other opposition politicians cite alleged ballot irregularities, including the disappearance of boxes and stuffing.
