= 2001 Chadian presidential election =

First re-election of Idriss Déby

- 20 May 2001
- Registered: 4,069,099
- Turnout: 61.37%
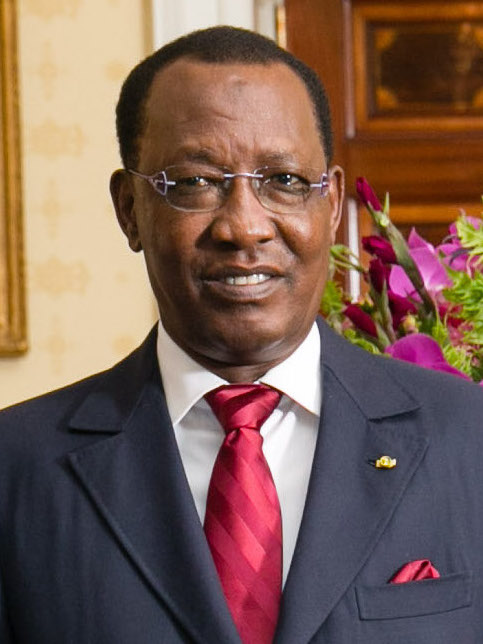

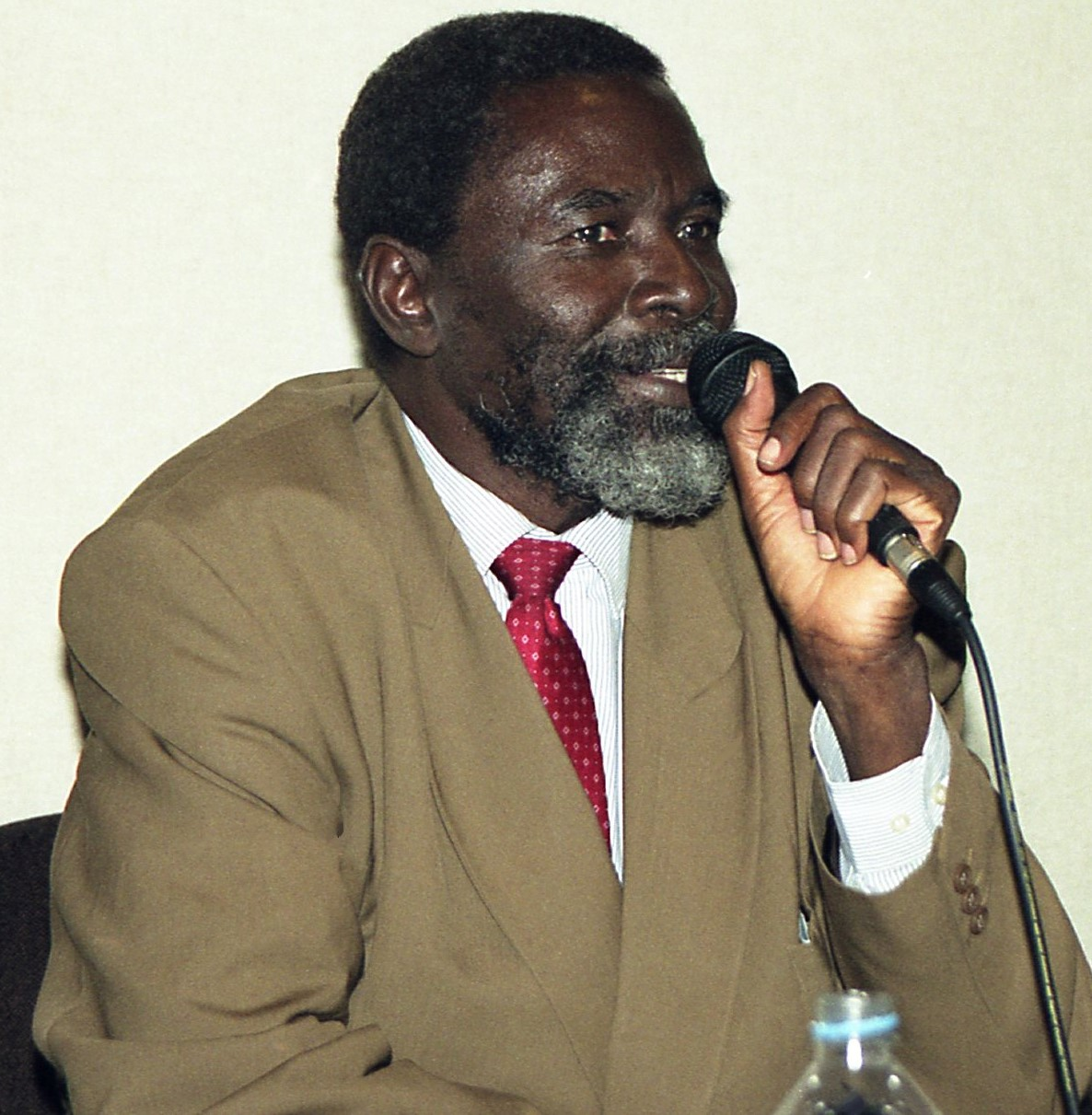

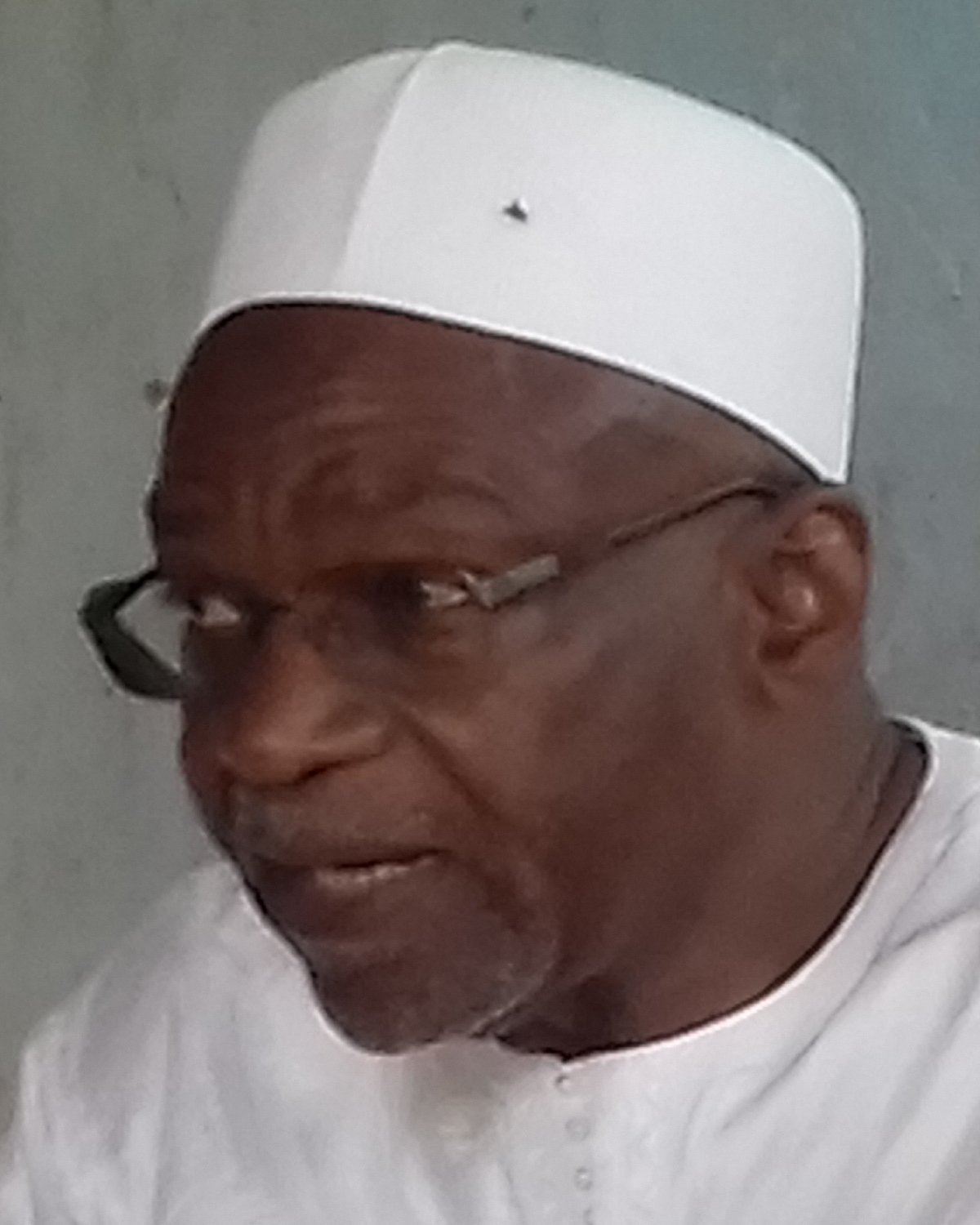
Candidate	Idriss Déby	Ngarlejy Yorongar
Party	MPS	FAR
Popular vote	1,533,509	396,864
Percentage	63.17%	16.35%
Candidate	Saleh Kebzabo	Wadel Abdelkader Kamougué
Party	UNDR	URD
Popular vote	169,917	146,125
Percentage	7.00%	6.02%
President before election
Idriss Déby
MPS
Elected President
Idriss Déby
MPS

Presidential elections were held in Chad on 20 May 2001. Incumbent President Idriss Déby of the Patriotic Salvation Movement was re-elected with 63% of the vote.

== Candidates ==
Déby stood as a candidate for a second term, and was supported by former opponent, Lol Mahamat Choua, leader of the Rally for Democracy and Progress (RDP).

== Results ==
Candidate	Party	Votes	%
Idriss Déby	Patriotic Salvation Movement	1,533,509	63.17
Ngarlejy Yorongar	Federation, Action for the Republic	396,864	16.35
Saleh Kebzabo	National Union for Democracy and Renewal	169,917	7.00
Wadel Abdelkader Kamougué	Union for Renewal and Democracy	146,125	6.02
Ibni Oumar Mahamat Saleh	Party for Liberty and Development	70,248	2.89
Delwa Kassiré Koumakoye	National Rally for Development and Progress	57,382	2.36
Jean Alingué Bawoyeu	Union for Democracy and the Republic	53,513	2.20
Total		2,427,558	100.00
Valid votes		2,427,558	97.21
Invalid/blank votes		69,657	2.79
Total votes		2,497,215	100.00
Registered voters/turnout		4,069,099	61.37
Source: African Elections Database

== Aftermath ==
The election results, showing a first-round majority for Déby, were contested by all of the opposition candidates. On 28 May the six opposition candidates were briefly arrested after meeting at the home of one of them, Saleh Kebzabo, and four opposition activists were killed in the action. They were released half-an-hour later.

Two days later, the six candidates and as many as 40 activists were once again arrested as the opposition prepared to lead a funeral procession for one of those killed two days earlier. They were all released after a direct phone call to Déby from the World Bank's President James Wolfensohn.

Déby was sworn in for another term on 8 August.
