= Fidèle Moungar =

Chadian politician

Fidèle Abdelkérim Moungar (born 1948) is a Chadian politician who served as Prime Minister of Chad in 1993. He is currently Secretary-General of Chadian Action for Unity and Socialism (ACTUS), a left-wing opposition party.

== Life ==
Moungar is an ethnic Sara, born in 1948 in Doba in the Logone Oriental Region, who has practiced as a surgeon in France. He started his political career when, along with other exiles, he founded ACTUS, a party hostile to both the FROLINAT and Wadel Abdelkader Kamougué's de facto government of southern Chad, the Comité Permanente du Sud, in May 1979 in Paris.

In 1992, two years after the rise to the presidency of Idriss Déby, he became Minister of Education in the government led by Jean Alingué Bawoyeu. At the Sovereign National Conference (CNS), a reconciliation conference representing most Chadian factions that was first convened on January 15, 1993,

Moungar was elected as transitional Prime Minister on 6 April 1993, receiving 444 votes against the 334 received by Adoum Helbongo. He succeeded Alingué as the 5th Prime Minister of Chad on 7 April.

Moungar formed a transitional government including 16 ministers, in which all party leaders had a post; among these, Saleh Kebzabo became Trade and Industry Minister, Delwa Kassiré Koumakoye became Communications Minister and Wadel Abdelkader Kamougué became Civil Service and Labour Minister. In a message on Radiodiffusion Nationale Tchadienne, Moungar asserted his cabinet's loyalty to the CNS' instructions, claiming that his ministers would be the CNS' "missionaries".

Moungar's tenure in office was marked by a confrontation with the President over the pace for adopting a multiparty political system, a confrontation that a Chadian journalist dates from June, when during a presidential visit to France Idriss Déby noted that Moungar was highly regarded by the French government. This made Déby conclude that Moungar might transform himself into a dangerous rival for the presidency. He was also led to suspect this, together with rival opposition leaders, by Moungar's conduct and speeches, which indicated a considerable ambition, despite his previous promise that he had no political interest in remaining in politics after the transition period. This brought the downfall of the Moungar cabinet on 28 October 1993, when the President's supporters presented a censure motion in the transitional parliament, the Conseil Supérieur de Transition (CST).

The CST (the country's transitional legislature charged with the task of monitoring the government's implementation of the CNS' recommendations) approved the motion with 45 votes against 10, and 1 abstained, displaying what the scholar William Miles calls "a good example of their deference to the Presidency", which repeated itself when the CST readily accepted Déby's candidate for Prime Minister, the Justice Minister Delwa Kassiré Koumakoye. Moungar called his removal unconstitutional, threatening to bring the issue to court, while workers went on strike, deserting their jobs.

In 1996, Moungar was disqualified from participating in the first Chadian multi-party presidential election for alleged residence irregularities.

In January 2007, Moungar strongly criticized French policy in Chad, asking for the recall of the French troops stationed in Chad. He claimed that "France has crucified Chadian democracy, systematically contributing to the faking of all elections, and, through the intervention of its troops, has caused the repression of all rebellions, in open violation of the Franco-Chadian accords."

On 30 July 2007, Moungar returned to Chad along with a delegation of about 20 other exiled opponents of the regime to meet with Déby and discuss how to restore peace to the country; he and the rest of the delegation returned to Libreville, Gabon on the same day. In November 2007, he said that he was outraged that France wanted the defendants in the Arche de Zoé child kidnapping case to be tried in France rather than Chad.

As of 2009, Moungar remains Secretary-General of ACTUS. As part of a peace initiative in February 2009, he met with Deby and then travelled to Khartoum to meet with Chadian rebel leaders.

== Private life ==
Moungar's eldest daughter, Vanessa Moungar, was born in 1984 and works at the African Development Bank.

Political offices
Preceded by Joseph Yodoyman	Prime Minister of Chad; April 7, 1993 – November 6, 1993	Succeeded by Delwa Kassiré Koumakoye
