= Nagoum Yamassoum =

Chadian politician

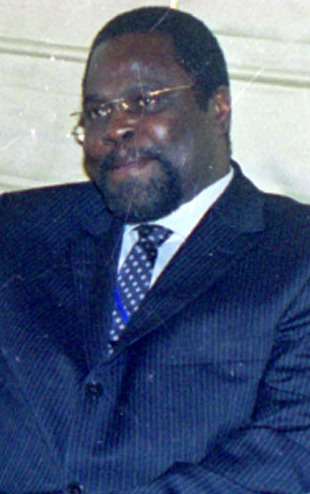
- Yamassoum in 2005

13th Prime Minister of Chad
- In office December 12, 1999 – June 13, 2002
- President: Idriss Deby
- Preceded by: Nassour Guelendouksia Ouaido
- Succeeded by: Haroun Kabadi

Nagoum Yamassoum (born 1954) is a Chadian politician who was Prime Minister of Chad from 1999 to 2002 and Minister of State for Foreign Affairs from 2003 to 2005. He is from the district of Grande Sido in the region of Moyen Chari.

== Early life and education ==
Yamassoum received a doctorate degree in political science from the University of Bordeaux in France, with a thesis entitled Contribution à l'étude des stratégies et techniques d'influence des États-Unis et de l'Union soviétique en Afrique sub-saharienne (A contribution to the study of American and Soviet strategies and techniques of influence in sub-Saharan Africa). His thesis was accepted in 1988. He has also written several works on the foreign policy of African states. In 1980, he published a work on the stance of Muammar Gaddafi in international relations, called La Politique extérieure du colonel Kadhafi (The foreign policy of Colonel Gaddafi). He also specifically studied the politics of Chad, including an analysis of the political repercussions of strikes against François Tombalbaye in N'Djamena during the years 1971 and 1972.

== Political career ==
In the 1996 presidential election, Yamassoum directed President Idriss Déby's campaign. After serving as President of the Constitutional Council, he was named Prime Minister of Chad on December 13, 1999; he had also previously served as Minister of Education and Minister of Culture. He served as Prime Minister until June 12, 2002, when he resigned and was replaced by Haroun Kabadi. In June 2003, when Kabadi's government resigned and a new government led by Moussa Faki took office, Yamassoum was appointed as the Minister of State for Foreign Affairs. He left that position in August 2005 when a cabinet reshuffle occurred.

Yamassoum was appointed as chairman of the Board of the Hydrocarbons Company of Chad (Societe des Hydrocarbures du Tchad, SHT) in November 2007. Later, as Secretary-General of the Patriotic Salvation Movement (MPS), Yamassoum was entrusted with leading the ruling party into 2011, a major election year—both parliamentary and presidential elections were planned. Critics argued that he lacked popularity with the party base. He was replaced as Secretary-General by Haroun Kabadi in January 2011, before the elections were held.

Yamassoum was subsequently appointed as President of the Constitutional Council. He headed the court when it validated the results of the April 2016 presidential election, in which Déby won re-election in the first round, on 4 May 2016.

In 2019, he became the first chairman of the newly created Central African Financial Market Supervisory Commission, a position he held until 2023.

Political offices
Preceded by Nassour Guelendouksia Ouaido	Prime Minister of Chad; December 12, 1999 – June 13, 2002	Succeeded by Haroun Kabadi
