= Allaf =

Allaf (Arabic: علاف) is an Arabic surname. Notable people with the surname include:

- Kareem Al Allaf (born 1998), American tennis player who has played for Syria and the US
- Mowaffak Allaf (1927–1996), Syrian diplomat
- Mohammed Al-Allaf (born 1950), Jordanian diplomat

== See also ==
- Allafi
- Allef
