= Senate of Chad =

Upper house of the Parliament of Chad

Senate of Chad Sénat du Tchad مجلس الشيوخ التشادي

Type
- Type: Upper house

History
- Founded: 2025
- New session started: 7 March 2025

Leadership
- President: Haroun Kabadi, MPS since 7 March 2025

Structure
- Seats: 69
- Political groups: Government (63): MPS (63); Opposition (6): RDNT (2); URD (1); UDT (1); PRET (1); PDI (1)
- Length of term: 6 years

Elections
- Voting system: Indirect election (46 seats); Nomination by the President (23 seats)
- Last election: 25 February 2025
- Next election: 25 February 2031

Meeting place
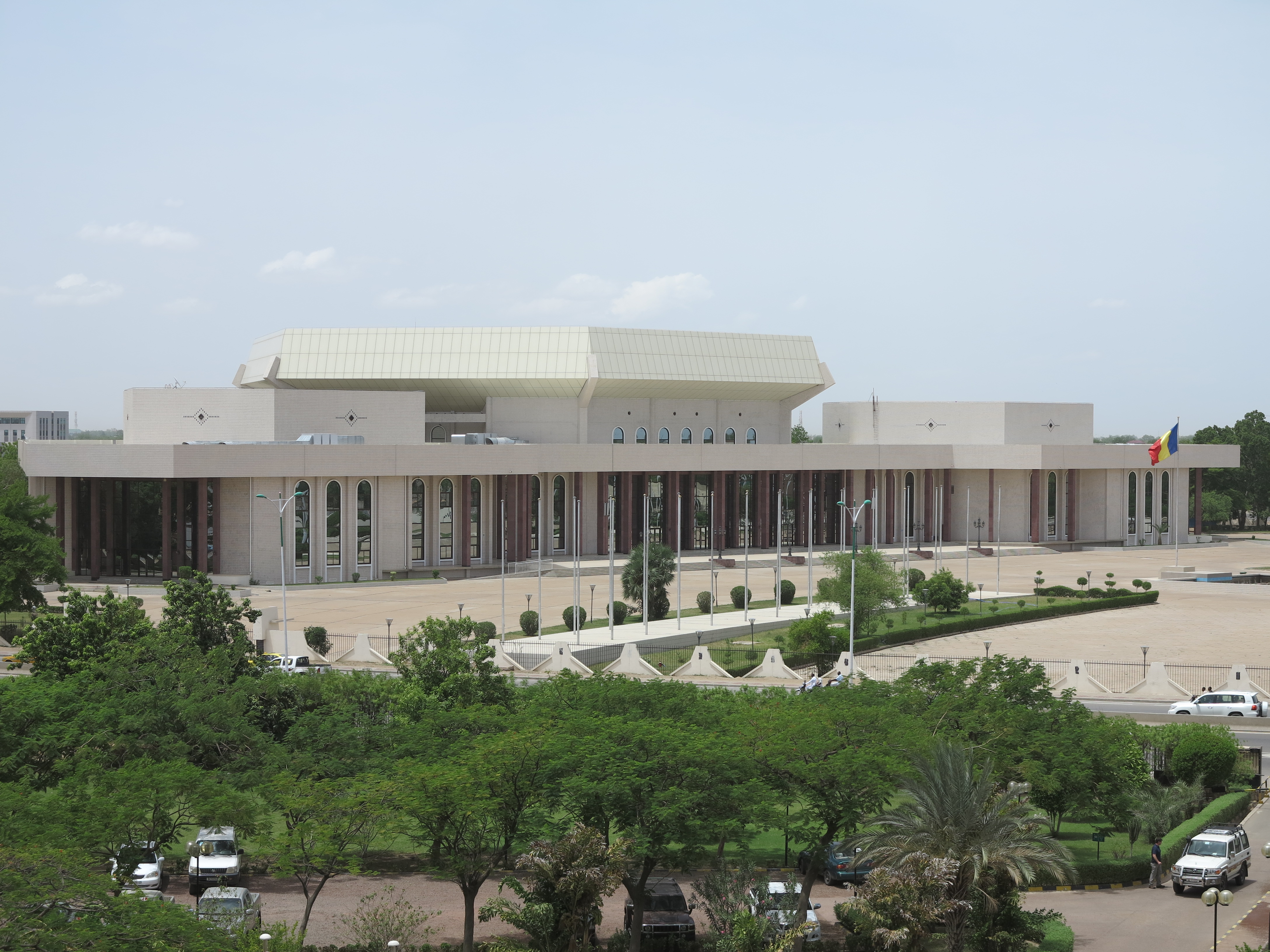
- Palais des Arts et de la Culture, N'Djamena

The Senate (French: Sénat) is one of the two chambers of the bicameral Chadian Parliament, the other being the National Assembly.

The resolution to establish the Senate was adopted by the National Transitional Council on 29 July 2024. The Senate has 69 members, 23 of whom are appointed by the president, and the rest elected indirectly by an electoral college composed of provincial and communal councillors. The senators have a term of six years, and one-third of them are elected every two years. The first senatorial elections took place on 25 February 2025.

== History ==
The 1996 constitution of Chad called for a Senate, which however was never formed. The 2005 constitutional referendum abolished the provision for a Senate. The Senate was again outlined in the 2020 revision of the new constitution. The first Senate of Chad was established in March 2025 with 69 elected senators. The initial parliamentary majority came from the ruling Patriotic Salvation Movement.

== Presidents ==
President of the Senate	Period	Notes
Haroun Kabadi	7 March 2025 –	

== See also ==
- Politics of Chad
