= Abbas Koty =

Abbas Koty Yacoub (1952–22 October 1993) was a Chadian political figure and rebel leader.

== Life ==
Abbas Koty was born in 1952, he belonged to the Zaghawa Kobé tribe and his family was linked to the Sultan of Iriba. Koty was Director of the Military Cabinet under Head of State Goukouni Oueddei from 1979 to June 1982, when Oueddei was ousted by Hissène Habré. He then went into exile in Nigeria. Although opposed to Habré, he returned to Chad in 1985 as part of a policy of national reconciliation, and in 1986 he was named chargé d'affaires to Sudan, serving there until 1988.

Koty then joined the rebel 1 April Movement and became a member of its Political Bureau, virtually transforming into the organization’s number two behind Idriss Déby. Subsequently, the 1 April Movement will join two other rebel groups, the Chadian National Salvation Movement (MOSONAT) led by Bada Abbas Maldoum, and the Chadian Armed Forces-Popular Revolutionary Movement (FAT/MRP) led by Hissein Dassert, to establish the Patriotic Salvation Movement (MPS). After it seized power in Chad in December 1990, he was promoted to colonel and became army chief of staff. In May 1991 he was appointed to the government as Minister of Defense, Veterans, and War Victims; in December 1991 he was moved to the position of Minister of Public Works and Transport. At an MPS party congress, Koty was elected to the party's Executive Committee and was placed in charge of defense and security.

On 18 June 1992 it was announced that a coup plot being organized by Koty had been thwarted. Koty fled into exile in Cameroon, where he was one of the founders of the National Committee for Recovery (CNR) on 21 June. In November 1992, he was elected as the group's president. Unlike the MPS, which had a more secularist inclination, the CNR had a strong Islamist orientation.

On 15 August 1993 he signed a peace agreement with the government in Tripoli, Libya, and subsequently returned to Chad. On 16 October he signed a further agreement with the government, providing for the transformation of the CNR into a political party, as well as the integration of group's fighters into the army. On 22 October, however, Koty was shot and killed in N'Djamena by security forces. According to the government, he had been plotting a coup and had resisted arrest, but the CNR denied this and said that he was killed because Déby perceived him as a threat due to his popularity. A U.S. State Department human rights report also cast doubt on the official account, alleging that there was "strong evidence that this was a political killing". After his death, the leadership of the CNR fell to his brother Hissein Koty, who announced the armed struggle.
