= Kamougue Assoum =

Chadian politician

Kamougue Dene-Assoum is a Chadian politician and the current minister of Infrastructure and Opening Up since 2022.

Assoum was appointed to the cabinet as minister of Agricultural Development in 2021 and moved to the new ministry of Infrastructure and Opening Up in a cabinet reshuffle in 2022. Kamougue Assoum is one of the nine women who were appointed into the forty-member transitional government by the ruling junta headed by Idriss Deby Itno, who died on April 20, 2021. She is also the Minister Coordinator of CILSS (Community Interim Livelihood Security Strategy), a regional initiative to enhance food security and resilience in West Africa.
