= Haroun Kabadi =

Chadian politician

- هارون كبادي
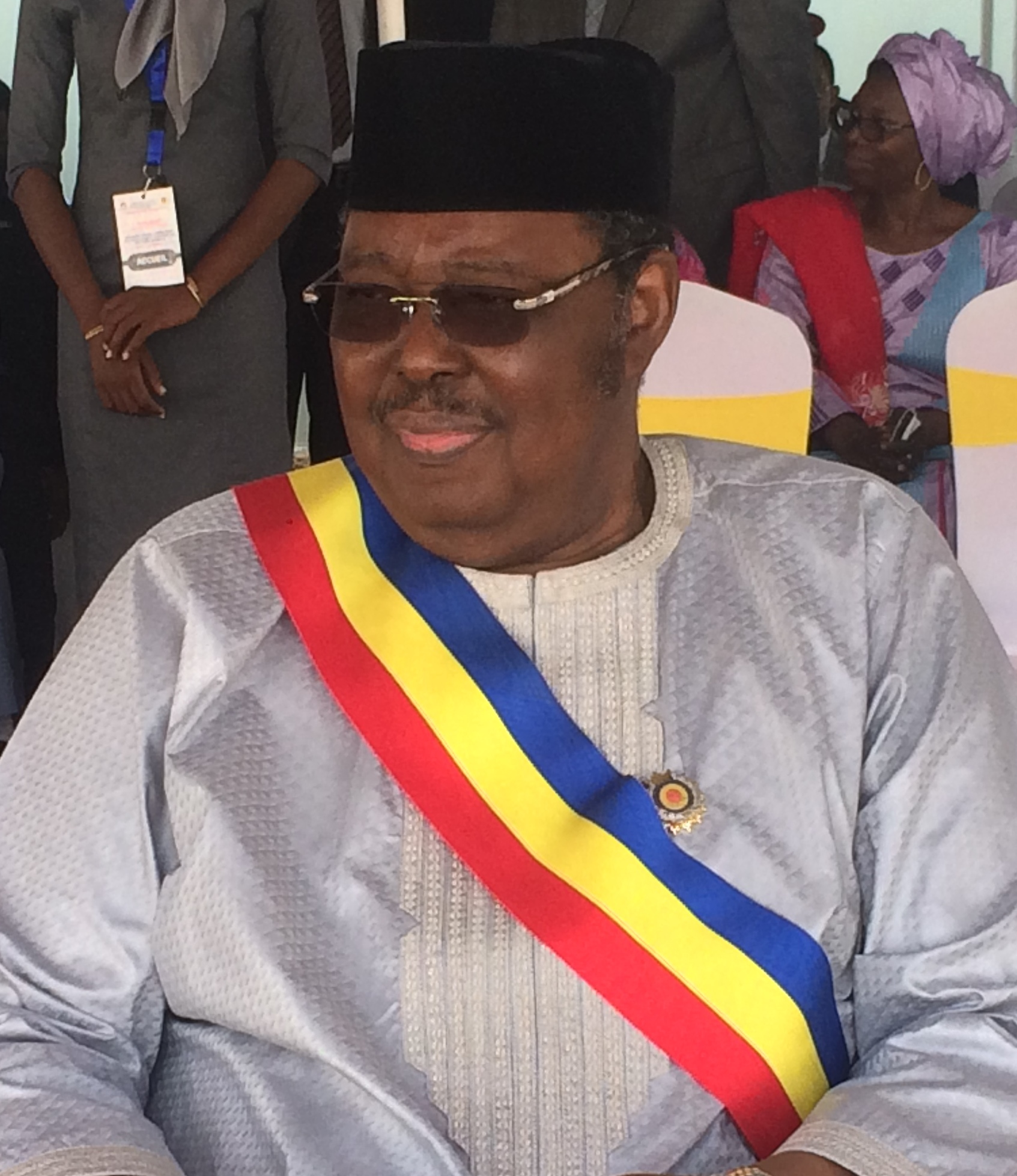
- Kabadi in 2021

President of the Senate of Chad
- Incumbent
- Assumed office 7 March 2025
- Preceded by: Office established

President of the Patriotic Salvation Movement
- Incumbent
- Assumed office 10 October 2022

President of the National Assembly of Chad
- In office 23 June 2011 – 20 April 2021
- Preceded by: Nassour Guelendouksia Ouaido

10th Prime Minister of Chad
- In office 12 June 2002 – 24 June 2003
- President: Idriss Deby
- Preceded by: Nagoum Yamassoum
- Succeeded by: Moussa Faki

Personal details
- Born: 29 April 1949 (age 77)
- Party: Patriotic Salvation Movement

Haroun Kabadi (Arabic: هارون كبادي Hārūn Kabādī; born 29 April 1949) is a Chadian politician. He was Prime Minister of Chad from June 2002 to June 2003 and was the President of the National Assembly of Chad from June 2011 to April 2021.

== Politics ==
Kabadi is a member of the Patriotic Salvation Movement (MPS). From January 1998 to July 1998, he was Minister of Communications and Government Spokesman. He then became managing director of the Société cotonnière du Tchad, the parastatal cotton company, before being appointed as Prime Minister on June 12, 2002. Later in June 2002, while reading his government programme to the National Assembly, Kabadi collapsed, reportedly due to high blood pressure and forgetting his medication; he quickly recovered after being carried into another room. He remained Prime Minister for one year until President Idriss Déby appointed Moussa Faki to replace him in June 2003.

On March 4, 2007, he was appointed as Minister of State for Agriculture, serving in that post until he was replaced in the government named on April 23, 2008.

Kabadi also served as Secretary-General of the Presidency for a time. He was elected to replace Nagoum Yamassoum as Secretary-General of the MPS in January 2011. Elected to a seat in the National Assembly in the February 2011 parliamentary election, Kabadi was then elected as President of the National Assembly in June 2011. Adrien Beyom succeeded Kabadi as Secretary-General of the MPS in October 2012 at the party's fifth congress.

In October 2021, Haroun Kabadi was appointed president of the National Transitional Council, the provisional parliament appointed by the ruling junta since Idriss Déby's death in April 2021.

On March 4, 2025, he was appointed senator by the President of the Republic. On March 7, 2025, he was appointed President of the Senate of Chad.

Political offices
Preceded by Nagoum Yamassoum	Prime Minister of Chad; June 13, 2002 – June 24, 2003	Succeeded by Moussa Faki
