= 2005 Chadian constitutional referendum =

6 June 2005
- Do you support the constitutional law proposal of revision of the Constitution of 31 March 1996 approved by the National Assembly on 23 May 2004?

Results
Choice	Votes	%
Yes	1,835,392	65.75%
No	956,180	34.25%
Valid votes	2,791,572	97.39%
Invalid or blank votes	74,810	2.61%
Total votes	2,866,382	100.00%
Registered voters/turnout	4,958,156	57.81%
- Results by region Yes; 50–54% 55–59% 60–64% 65–69% ≥70%

A constitutional referendum was held in Chad on 6 June 2005. The amendments to the constitution were approved by 66% of voters.

== Background ==
The proposed amendments to the constitution included the removal of two-term limit on the President, the replacement of the Senate with a Cultural, Economic and Social Council, and giving the President powers to amend the constitution.

The amendments were proposed by incumbent President Idriss Déby, who was due to complete his second term in 2006. In June 2001 Déby had promised to step down after his second term, stating: I make a public commitment: I will not be candidate at the 2006 presidential election. I will not change the Constitution [...] What remains to do for me in my last mandate, is to prepare Chad for alternation in government.

== Campaign ==
While Dèby's Patriotic Salvation Movement (MPS) campaigned for "yes", the opposition was divided among those who called for a boycott of the vote and those who called for a "no" vote. The abstentionists allied themselves in the Coordination des Partis politiques pour la Défense de la Constitution (CPDC), an alliance of 24 parties including the Rally for Democracy and Progress and the Union for Renewal and Democracy. The parties that campaigned for a "no" vote included the Front of Action Forces for the Republic and the Rally for the Republic – Lingui.

== Results ==
Do you support the constitutional law proposal of revision of the Constitution of 31 March 1996 approved by the National Assembly on 23 May 2004?

Choice	Votes	%
For	1,835,392	65.75
Against	956,180	34.25
Total	2,791,572	100.00
Valid votes	2,791,572	97.39
Invalid/blank votes	74,810	2.61
Total votes	2,866,382	100.00
Registered voters/turnout	4,958,156	57.81
Source: African Elections Database

=== By region ===
Regions	Registered Voters	Voters	Invalid Votes	Valid Votes	For	%	Against	%	Turnout
Batha	313,441	203,955	1,943	202,012	137,224	67.93	64,788	32.07	65.1
Borkou-Ennedi-Tibesti	96,945	69,718	756	68,962	52,487	76. 11	16,475	23.89	71.9
Chari-Baguirmi	260,297	150,371	3,478	146,893	92,548	63.00	54,345	37.00	57.8
Guéra	248,861	151,516	1,884	149,632	102,046	68.20	47,586	31.80	60.9
Hadjer-Lamis	328,955	217,327	2,740	214,587	144,936	67.54	69,651	32.46	66.1
Kanem	300,089	159,220	901	158,319	110,726	69.94	47,593	30.06	53.1
Lac	202,651	124,161	1,219	122,942	87,981	71.56	34,961	28.44	61.3
Logone Occidental	268,521	121,017	5,971	115,046	58,292	50.67	56,754	49.33	45.1
Logone Oriental	258,420	138,786	4,530	134,256	76,927	57.30	57,329	42.70	53.7
Mandoul	242,256	171,000	7,523	163,477	102,812	62.89	60,665	37.11	70.6
Mayo-Kebbi Est	323,160	178,833	4,012	174,821	104,279	59.65	70,542	40.35	55.3
Mayo-Kebbi Ouest	195,714	137,366	6,143	131,223	81,593	62.18	49,630	37.82	70.2
Moyen-Chari	243,182	117,095	5,860	111,235	61,923	55.67	49,312	44.33	48.2
Ouaddaï	507,112	384,585	9,038	375,547	274,982	73.22	100,565	13.04	83.7
Salamat	161,162	101,339	849	100,490	68,647	68.31	31,843	31.69	62.9
Tandjilé	253,795	129,590	4,980	124,610	74,045	59.42	50,565	40.58	51.1
Wadi Fira	190,234	137,482	1,026	136,456	95,678	70.12	40,778	29.88	72.3
N'Djamena	563,361	173,021	11,957	161,064	108,266	67.22	52,798	32.78	30.7
Total	4,958,156	2,866,382	74,810	2,791,572	1,835,392	65.75	956,180	34.25	57.8
Source: African Elections Database

== Aftermath ==
The constitutional amendment allowed Déby to contest the 2006 presidential elections, in which he won a third term.
