= Allef =

Allef is a given name. Notable people with the name include:

- Allef (footballer, born 1993), Brazilian football defender
- Allef (footballer, born 1994), Brazilian football forward

== See also ==
- Allaf
