= Ngarlejy Yorongar =

Chadian politician

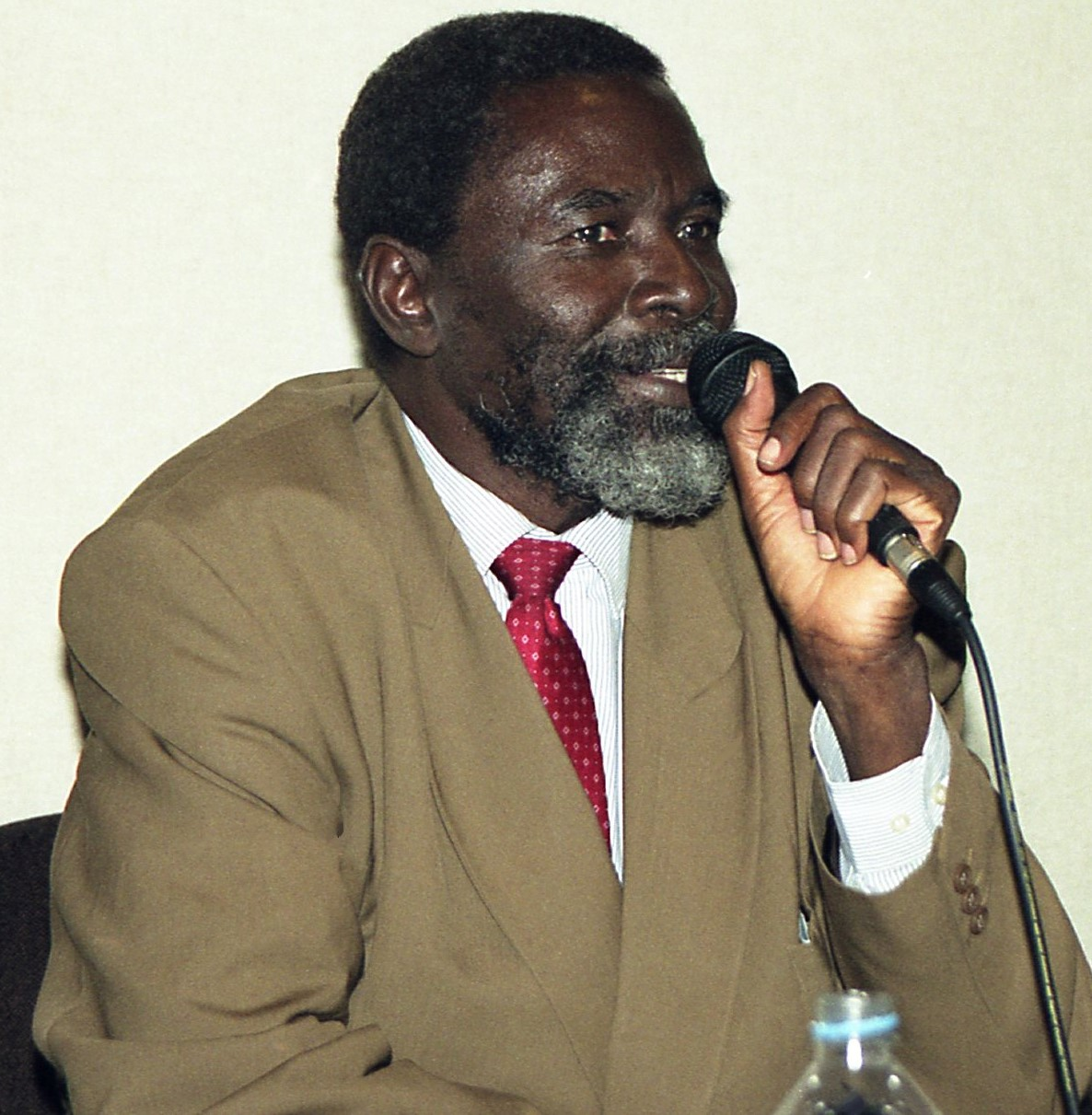
Ngarlejy Yorongar

Ngarlejy Koji Yorongar le Moinban is a Chadian politician. He is the Executive Federal Coordinator of the Federation, Action for the Republic (in French: Fédération, action pour la république or FAR), a radical opposition party, as well as a Deputy in the National Assembly of Chad and President of the Federation Parliamentary Group.

== Early career ==
Before entering politics, Yorongar worked in the Chadian civil service. His first employment was in N'Djamena at the Ministry of Finance; thence he became in succession adjutant to the sub-prefect of Moundou, sub-prefect of Mbaïnarmar, first adjutant to the prefect and then prefect of Guéra. At this point Yorongar passed to working out of Chad, first as consultant in Paris to the Organisation for Economic Co-operation and Development (OCDE), then as director of the African Bureau of Educational Sciences (BASE) at Kisangani (Zaire), lastly as director of the Institut International des Assurances (IIA) at Yaoundé (Cameroon).

== Political career ==
The first of his many politically motivated arrests was in March 1994, when he was detained for five days. Yorongar ran in the June 1996 presidential election and received 2.08% of the popular vote (tenth place) in the first round. On July 3, 1996, he was arrested without a warrant, allegedly beaten, and held without charge for longer than legally permitted. Eventually, he was charged with illegally campaigning for Wadel Abdelkader Kamougué, one of the candidates in the second round of the presidential election, and engaging in arms trafficking with rebels. These charges were subsequently dismissed, and he was released.

Yorongar was elected to the National Assembly as a FAR candidate in the first round of the 1997 parliamentary election. He was the only FAR candidate to obtain a seat in the election.

In an interview in July 1997, he accused Kamougué, who was by this time the President of the National Assembly, of taking a bribe of 15 million French francs from Elf, a partner in the Chad-Cameroon Petroleum Development and Pipeline Project. In the previous month, he accused President Idriss Déby of nepotism in the management of the oil industry. Kamougué charged Yorongar with defamation in August, and on May 26, 1998, he was stripped of his parliamentary immunity. He was arrested on June 3. On July 20, after a trial judged unfair by Amnesty International, he was found guilty of defamation and sentenced to three years imprisonment and a fine of 500,000 CFA francs. He was released after eight months of detention on February 5, 1999.

On March 22, 2001, Yorongar, on behalf of 120 Chadians, submitted to the World Bank Inspection Panel a request for inspection of the pipeline project, claiming that people living in the Project area and their environment had or were likely to suffer harm as a result of failures and omissions in the design, appraisal, and supervision by the International Development Association of the Project. Also, the request claimed that proper consultation with and disclosure of information to the local communities was not taking place.

In the presidential election of 2001, in which incumbent Idriss Déby obtained a second mandate, Yorongar came second with 396,864 votes (16.35%). Yorongar and the other opposition candidates hotly contested the fairness of the election; the answer of the government was to arrest them twice, first briefly on May 28 and then on May 30, when they were freed after the intervention of the World Bank's President James Wolfensohn. Yorongar was apparently tortured while in detention, enduring beatings with iron bars on his back. This was confirmed by the Chadian physicians who first treated him after his release.

The following year Yorongar's party participated in the 2002 parliamentary election. The FAR obtained 10 seats, and Yorongar was re-elected to the National Assembly as a FAR candidate from Bebedjia constituency in Logone Oriental Department. Yorongar is currently the President of the Federation Parliamentary Group.

Two years later, in 2004, the Chadian state was shaken by a serious crisis caused by the determination of the President to obtain a third mandate through a reform of the Constitution. When the following year a constitutional referendum to sanction the National Assembly's vote was looming, Yorongar first attempted to have the amendments proclaimed unconstitutional by the Supreme Court; when this failed, he refused to boycott the referendum, unlike the other main opposition parties, and he instead campaigned for a "no" vote. The referendum nevertheless passed according to official results. Yorongar boycotted the May 2006 presidential election, along with most of the opposition, considering it a masquerade intended only to legitimize Dèby's continued rule.

The FAR was the only major opposition party to not sign an agreement on August 13, 2007, that provided for improved electoral organization ahead of the next parliamentary election, now planned for 2009. Yorongar criticized the agreement as inadequate and said that signing it would be a "waste of time". He said that there should instead be a dialogue involving the entire political scene, including rebels, the exiled opposition, and civil society, and that a credible election could not be conducted while a rebellion was taking place in part of the country. Yorongar was also critical of the fact that the independent electoral commission would be subject to the decisions of the Constitutional Council, which he alleged is controlled by Déby, and of the management of the electoral census by the government instead of the electoral commission.

=== 2008 arrest ===
During a battle between government forces and rebels in N'Djamena, soldiers reportedly surrounded Yorongar's house and arrested him on February 3, 2008. On February 9, Yorongar's son Roukoulmian Yorongar said that he was afraid for father's life, recalling the effects of his 2001 torture and saying that his father was already in poor health. Roukoulmian said that his father could not have been working with the rebels, because he had supported inclusive dialogue rather than violence as a means of achieving change. The government claimed on February 22 that Yorongar had resurfaced in the Moursal district of N'Djamena, but this was disputed, with Yorongar's son and an opposition lawyer saying that no one in the district reported seeing Yorongar. The lawyer, Mahamat Hassan Abacar, said that the government was only trying to give assurances to the French in hopes that French President Nicolas Sarkozy would visit Chad.

On March 1, 2008, Afrique Education magazine published an interview with Yorongar, which it said he had given by telephone from neighboring Cameroon. In this interview, Yorongar described being arrested (and simultaneously beaten) by soldiers on February 3, and he said that he was subsequently held in a secret prison, along with two other arrested opposition leaders, Lol Mahamat Choua and Ibni Oumar Mahamat Saleh. He was held in a small cell and his legs were chained together, until on February 21 he was taken to a cemetery and forced to lie down between two graves. His blindfold and chain were then removed; his captors fired two shots near him and drove away. Yorongar said that he then fled across the border to Cameroon. In the interview, he insisted that he had no links with the rebels. He was flown from Maroua in northern Cameroon to Yaoundé on March 2, and on March 6 he arrived in Paris. He said that he was in very bad condition as a result of his treatment in captivity and was worried that he might have been poisoned; he also said that he believed Saleh was probably dead. The French government offered to grant Yorongar political asylum, although Yorongar said that he did not want to request it at that time.

In an interview on March 7, 2008, Yorongar urged the French to pressure the Chadian government to allow the return of all exiled opponents of Déby and hold a national dialogue that would include the rebels. He said that Déby was trying to eliminate the opposition because, in Yorongar's view, he could not win a transparent election. Yorongar also said that he had a visa for three months and that he intended to remain in France during that time.

Yorongar returned to Chad from France on December 8, 2008.
