= National Democratic and Social Convention =

Political party in Chad

The National Democratic and Social Convention (French: Convention national démocratique et sociale, CNDS), sometimes referred to as the National Convention for Social Democracy, is a political party in Chad.

== History ==
The party nominated Adoum Moussa Seif as its candidate for the 1996 presidential elections; Seif finished seventh out of fifteen candidates with 3% of the vote. In the parliamentary elections the following year the party won one seat in the National Assembly.

The CNDS supported incumbent President Idriss Déby in the 2001 presidential elections, and retained its single seat in the 2002 parliamentary elections.

It contested the 2011 parliamentary elections as part of several alliances. A joint list with Action for Renewal of Chad (ART) won one seat, a joint list with the ART and Popular Party for Justice and Equality won another, while a joint list with the Movement for the Peace and Development of Chad–Rally for Democracy and Progress/Renewed won a third.
