= Allafi =

Allafi is a surname. Notable people with the surname include:

- Agnes Allafi (born 1959), Chadian politician and sociologist
- Rabee Allafi, Libyan footballer
