= Isabelle Kassire =

Chadian politician

Isabelle Housna Kassire
- Citizenship: Chad
- Occupations: Politician, Secretary of State, Minister
- Organization: Ministry of Foreign Affairs
- Known for: Female Politician in Chad, Secretary of state for foreign affairs, formerly Minister of Vocational Training and Trades of Chad

Isabelle Housna Kassire is a Chadian politician currently serving as secretary of state for foreign affairs appointed on 14 October 2022 following the creation of the secretariat for Chadian in diaspora and international cooperation. Previously, she was minister of Vocational Training before being moved to foreign affairs in a cabinet reshuffle.
