= Agnes Allafi =

Chadian politician and sociologist

Agnes Allafi (born January 21, 1959) is a Chadian politician and sociologist. During her political career, Allafi was the Minister of Social Services two times between the late 1990s to early 2000s.

== Background ==
Allafi's father was an officer in François Tombalbaye's army until 1975, and he was executed on orders of Hissène Habré when Habré took control of N'Djamena in October 1982. Shortly after Habré took power, Allafi's husband was killed by Habré's secret police. After the death of her husband, Allafi fled to Cameroon with her family.

== Education ==
In 1980, Allafi obtained her bachelor's degree in Bongor. Upon graduation, Allafi became a teacher from 1981 to 1982. After moving to Benin in 1985, Allafi earned a master's degree in sociology from the National University of Benin. Her thesis was about the application of article 124 of Benin's constitution, which ensured equal rights for women and men.

== Politics ==
Allafi returned to Chad after the end of Habré's government in 1990 and joined the Provisional Council of the Republic, serving on its Health and Social Services Commission. She also became one of the first female leaders in the Patriotic Salvation Movement party. Allafi then joined the Ministry of Agriculture in 1992 and continued as a staff member of the government in the early 2000s.

== Women's rights ==
Allafi supported women's rights, and in 1995 she became leader of the Chadian delegation at the Beijing International Conference on Women. From January 1998 to December 1999 and from June 2002 to June 2003, she was Minister of Social Services. Allafi also organized a Chadian women's conference in 1999, created a women's caucus in the parliament of Chad, and created a mock parliament for youths.
