= Chadian Action for Unity and Socialism =

Political party in Chad

Chadian Action for Unity and Socialism Action tchadienne pour l'unité et le socialisme
- Abbreviation: ACTUS/prpe
- Secretary-General: Fidèle Moungar
- Founded: 1981
- Newspaper: Perspectives
- Ideology: Communism; Marxism-Leninism; Stalinism
- Political position: Far-left

Chadian Action for Unity and Socialism (French: Action tchadienne pour l'unité et le socialisme) is a Marxist-Leninist party in Chad, led by Fidèle Moungar. The party was founded in 1981.

Moungar was chosen as Prime Minister in April 1993 by the Sovereign National Conference, but subsequently lost an October 1993 vote of no-confidence and resigned. ACTUS joined the 13-member Coordination of Armed Movements and Political Parties of the Opposition (CMAP) coalition in December 1999.

In the parliamentary election held on April 21, 2002, the party won 1 out of 155 seats. Its sole deputy in the National Assembly, Nderbé Kemnade, joined the Federation Parliamentary Group, which is primarily composed of the Federation, Action for the Republic (FAR) party.

ACTUS publishes the magazine Perspectives.

There is a break-away faction of ACTUS led by Ley-Ngardigal Djimadoum.
