= Saleh Kebzabo =

Chadian politician

- صالح كبزابو
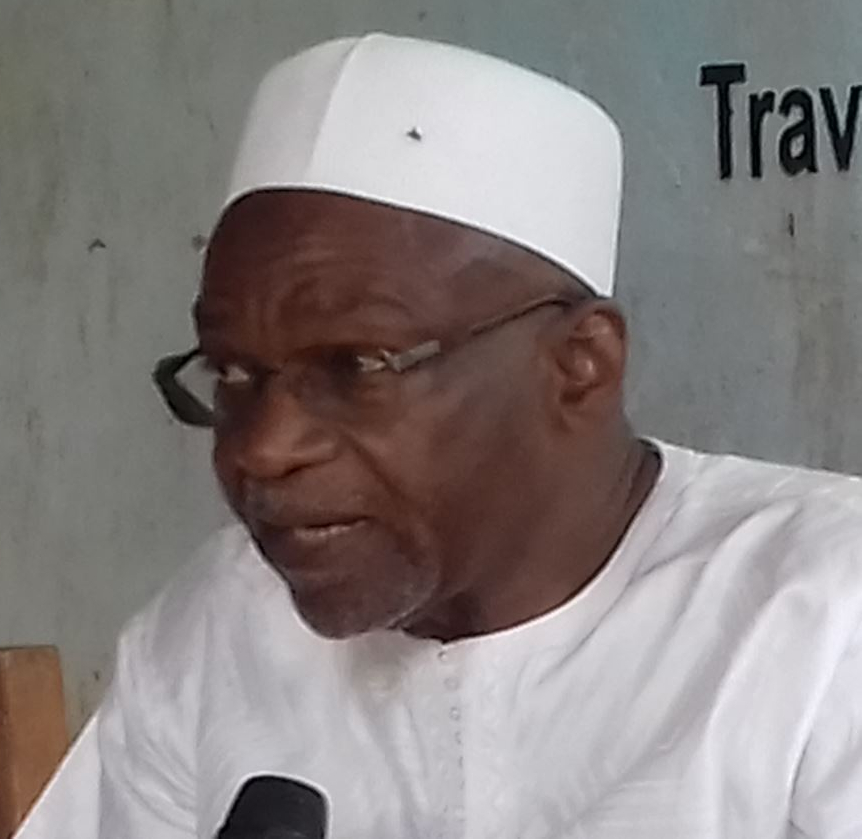
- Kebzabo in 2016

Prime Minister of Chad
- In office 12 October 2022 – 1 January 2024
- President: Mahamat Déby
- Preceded by: Albert Pahimi Padacké
- Succeeded by: Succès Masra

Personal details
- Born: 27 March 1947 (age 78) Léré, French Equatorial Africa (now Chad)
- Party: National Union for Democracy and Renewal

Saleh Kebzabo (Arabic: صالح كبزابو, born 27 March 1947 in Léré, Chad) is a Chadian politician. He was the President of the National Union for Development and Renewal (UNDR) and a Deputy in the National Assembly of Chad. He was designated Prime Minister by president Mahamat Déby on 12 October 2022.

== Political career ==
Kebzabo was a director at the Chadian Press Agency, a member of the Democratic Movement for the Restoration of Chad (MDRT), and was a journalist at Jeune Afrique and Demain l'Afrique. He was subsequently the founder of N'Djaména Hebdo, Chad's first independent newspaper. He was a consul in Douala, Cameroon, but was expelled from Cameroon by President Paul Biya due to his support for Biya's predecessor, Ahmadou Ahidjo.

He was one of the founding members of the UNDR political party in December 1992. In April 1993, following the Sovereign National Conference, he was appointed as Minister of Trade and Industry in the government of Prime Minister Fidèle Moungar. This government lasted only six months before the Higher Transitional Council (CST) approved a censure motion against it.

Accused of working with rebels, in September 1995 Kebzabo was arrested and held for five days. Prior to the arrest, his home was searched without a warrant at night on August 30. Kebzabo was released after the opposition protested his detention, and he filed suit against the officials who were responsible for the incident.

Kebzabo's primary support base is in Mayo-Kebbi. He was a candidate in the June 1996 presidential election, placing third with 8.61% of the vote; he then backed President Idriss Déby for the second round. After Déby's victory, Kebzabo became Foreign Minister of Chad in August 1996, serving in that position until he was named Minister of State for Public Works, Transportation, Housing and Urban Development on May 21, 1997. He was elected to the National Assembly as an UNDR candidate in the first round of the 1997 parliamentary election, although he remained in the government and did not take his seat.

Kebzabo became Minister of State for Mines, Energy, and Oil in a cabinet reshuffle on January 1, 1998, but he was dismissed from the government on May 11, 1998, along with two other UNDR ministers. Regarding his dismissal, he said that his goals could be achieved outside of the government. In December 1999, he was named Minister of State for Agriculture in the government of Prime Minister Nagoum Yamassoum.

On April 1, 2001, Kebzabo was again nominated as the UNDR's presidential candidate for that year's election. He was subsequently removed from his position as Minister of State for Agriculture on April 8; the other UNDR members of the government were also dismissed. Prior to this he was considered the second ranking member of the government, after the prime minister. It was speculated that Kebzabo chose to run for President on this occasion because he had been unsuccessful in negotiating with Déby for the post of Prime Minister. Kebzabo later said that he had participated in the government in the belief that by doing so he could undermine Déby from within the system, and that as a result he believed the UNDR was a "permanent target" of Déby.

In the presidential election, held on May 20, 2001, he placed third with 7% of the vote. In late May he was twice detained briefly by police, along with five other opposition candidates.

In the April 2002 parliamentary election, Kebzabo was elected to the National Assembly as a UNDP candidate from Léré constituency in Mayo-Dallah Department, and he became President of the Democratic Parliamentary Group during the parliamentary term that followed the election.

According to Kebzabo, on February 3, 2008, during a battle between government forces and rebels in N'Djamena, soldiers came to Kebzabo's home to arrest him, but he was travelling at the time. He said that the soldiers fired at his brother. In a statement on February 26, he and another opposition leader, Wadel Abdelkader Kamougué, released a statement calling for "the immediate convening of an all-inclusive national dialogue", the release of the three opposition leaders who had been arrested, along with an international inquiry into the arrests, and an immediate cease-fire.

Although the UNDR is a member of the Coordination of Political Parties for the Defense of the Constitution (CPDC), and the CPDC chose to join the government of Prime Minister Youssouf Saleh Abbas in April 2008, Kebzabo declined to take a post in the government, saying that he preferred that someone else from his party enter the government instead. Kebzabo said that his party work in the UNDR was absorbing him at the time; he described this work as "an enriching experience" and said that he was already beginning preparations for the planned 2009 parliamentary election.

In June 2017, members of the FONAC opposition coalition argued that the National Assembly became illegitimate by continuing to sit beyond 21 June, two years after the extension of the parliamentary term, and that deputies from the opposition should consequently resign. Opposition deputies led by Saleh Kebzabo responded that they would not resign, feeling that it would be more "useful" for them to remain in the National Assembly; however, they also said that the next election should be held promptly, dismissing Déby's view that the delay was necessary due to a lack of funds, and that in the future the government should make every effort to hold elections on time.

In August 2021, Saleh Kebzabo, the main opponent of the regime of former Chadian President Idriss Déby Itno, killed in April 2021 by rebels, was appointed vice-president of the organizing committee of the "inclusive national dialogue" to lead to presidential and legislative elections in Chad.

Political offices
Preceded by Albert Pahimi Padacké	Prime Minister of Chad; 2022–2024	Succeeded by Succès Masra
