= 1996 Chadian presidential election =

Election of Idriss Déby

- 2 June 1996 (first round); 3 July 1996 (second round)
- Turnout: 67.50% (first round); 77.68% (second round)
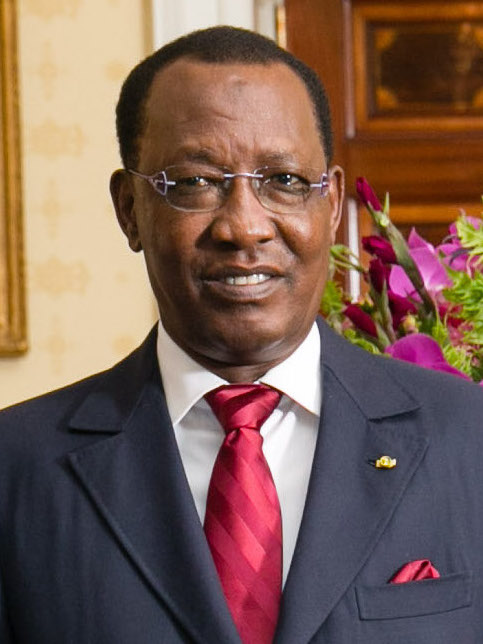

Candidate	Idriss Déby	Wadel Abdelkader Kamougué
Party	MPS	URD
Popular vote	2,102,907	834,568
Percentage	71.59%	28.41%
President before election
Idriss Déby
MPS
Elected President
Idriss Déby
MPS

Presidential elections were held in Chad on 2 June 1996, with a second round on 3 July. They were the first multiparty presidential elections in the history of Chad and occurred at the end of a long transitional process after repeated delays. The elections were won by the incumbent President Idriss Déby, who easily defeated a prominent southern politician, Wadel Abdelkader Kamougué, in the second round. Déby benefited from the support of another southern politician, Saleh Kebzabo, who finished third in the first round. The election was marred by widespread and credible reports of electoral fraud and government intimidation of opposition forces, confirmed by international observers. Voter turnout was 68% in the first round and 78% in the second.

Following his victory, Déby was sworn in on 8 August 1996.

== Results ==
Candidate	Party	First round		Second round	
Candidate	Party	Votes	%	Votes	%
Idriss Déby	Patriotic Salvation Movement	1,016,277	43.83	2,102,907	71.59
Wadel Abdelkader Kamougué	Union for Renewal and Democracy	287,512	12.40	834,568	28.41
Saleh Kebzabo	National Union for Democracy and Renewal	199,691	8.61		
Jean Alingué Bawoyeu	Union for Democracy and the Republic	192,816	8.32		
Lol Mahamat Choua	Rally for Democracy and Progress	137,612	5.93		
Younous Ibédou	Convention of Social-Democrat Chadians	76,293	3.29		
Adoum Moussa Seif	National Democratic and Social Convention	67,496	2.91		
Abdoulaye Lamana	National Union	63,671	2.75		
Delwa Kassiré Koumakoye	National Rally for Development and Progress	53,260	2.30		
Ngarlejy Yorongar	Federation, Action for the Republic	48,407	2.09		
Mahamat Abdoulaye	People's Movement for Democracy in Chad	47,830	2.06		
Abbas Mahamat Ambadi	Independent	37,568	1.62		
Naimbaye Lossimian	Action for the Republic, Democracy and Development	35,420	1.53		
Adoum Hassan Issa	National Union for the Reform of Chad	28,877	1.25		
Elie Romba	Democratic Union for Progress in Chad	26,008	1.12		
Total		2,318,738	100.00	2,937,475	100.00
Valid votes		2,318,738	96.33	2,937,475	97.68
Invalid/blank votes		88,224	3.67	69,699	2.32
Total votes		2,406,962	100.00	3,007,174	100.00
Registered voters/turnout		3,565,913	67.50	3,871,044	77.68
Source: Nohlen et al.
