= Rally for Democracy and Progress (Chad) =

Political party in Chad

Rally for Democracy and Progress: Rassemblement pour la démocracie et le progrès; التجمع للديمقراطية والتقدم
- Abbreviation: RDP
- President: Mahamat Allahou Taher
- Founder: Lol Mahamat Choua
- Founded: December 1991
- Legalised: 16 March 1992
- Headquarters: N'Djamena
- Slogan: Dignité, Justice, Travail
- Seats in the National Assembly: 8 / 188

Website
- rdptchad.org

The Rally for Democracy and Progress (French: Rassemblement pour la démocratie et le progrès, Arabic: التجمع من أجل الديمقراطية والتقدم) is a political party in Chad, led by Lol Mahamat Choua.

The party was founded by Choua in December 1991 and was among the first batch of political parties to be legalized in March 1992.

In the parliamentary election held on 21 April 2002, the party, allied to the ruling Patriotic Salvation Movement, won 12 out of 155 seats.

However, since the 2005 Chad constitutional referendum, which would allow President Idriss Déby to eliminate presidential terms, the RDP has been part of the opposition.

== Election results ==
=== National Assembly elections ===
| Election | Party leader | Votes | % | Votes | % | Seats | +/– | Position | Result |
| Election | Party leader | First round | | Second round | | Seats | +/– | Position | Result |
|---|---|---|---|---|---|---|---|---|---|
| 1997 | Lol Mahamat Choua | 84,372 | 6.69% | 13,140% | 1.72% | 3 / 125 | New | 4th | Opposition |
| 2002 | Lol Mahamat Choua | | | —N/a | | 10 / 155 | ▲7 | ▲2nd | Support |
| 2011 | Lol Mahamat Choua | in alliance with MPS and RNDP | | | | 33 / 187 | ▲23 | 2nd | MPS–RDP–RNDP |
| 2024 | Mahamat Allahou Taher | 242,821 | 6.05% | —N/a | | 8 / 188 | ▼25 | ▼3rd | Support |
