= Wadel Abdelkader Kamougué =

Chadian politician

Vice President of Chad
- In office 1979–1982

President of the National Assembly
- In office 1997–2002

Personal details
- Born: May 20, 1939
- Died: May 9, 2011 (aged 71)

Wadel Abdelkader Kamougué (May 20, 1939 – May 9, 2011) was a Chadian politician and army officer. Kamougué was a leading figure in the 1975 coup d'état and subsequently held several positions in the Chadian government and legislature. He was Vice President of Chad from 1979 to 1982 and President of the National Assembly from 1997 to 2002. Kamougué was also President of the Union for Renewal and Democracy (URD) political party, and he was appointed as Minister of National Defense in April 2008.

== Life and career ==
He was born in Bitam, Gabon, where his father was serving as a soldier in the French Army. However, his family were from Logone Oriental in southern Chad and he was always considered to be Chadian. Kamougué attended the school for soldiers' children in Brazzaville before joining the army himself and then being sent to France for officer training.

As a junior officer he was one of the key military leaders (some sources name him as "the" leader) of the coup d'etat which overthrew and killed Chadian President Ngarta Tombalbaye on April 13, 1975. He was Minister of Foreign Affairs from 1975 to 1978 as well as a member of the Higher Military Council (Conseil supérieur militaire, CSM) under Head of State Félix Malloum.

Known as a hardliner, Kamougué had a role in violent ethnic clashes, notably in early March 1979 when he went to Moundou and incited mass violence against Muslims. The local imam stated that 600 Muslims were massacred as a result, while European expatriates in Moundou corroborated that hundreds had been killed. This large-scale violence played a role in bringing the rival rebel factions of the FAN and FAP - led by Hissène Habré and Goukouni Oueddei respectively - closer to each other again.

Kamougué subsequently became Vice President in the Transitional Government of National Unity (GUNT). Oueddei became President on November 10, 1979, remaining in that position until the GUNT was overthrown by supporters of Habré when they captured N'Djamena on June 7, 1982.

After Habré seized N'Djamena, Kamougué, based in Moundou, continued to control southern Chad at the head of a permanent committee, and he called for a federal solution to the conflict, which was rejected by Habré. On September 4, 1982, a broadcast from N'Djamena announced that rebels within Kamougué's forces had captured his headquarters and that he had fled to Cameroon.

Kamougué returned from exile in early 1987. He then became Minister of Agriculture under Habré in August 1987.

Kamougué was appointed as Minister of Civil Service and Labor in April 1993, as part of the transitional government formed after the Sovereign National Conference. Following the January 1994 devaluation of the CFA franc, a civil service strike began on April 26, 1994, seeking higher salaries to compensate for the devaluation of the currency, and Kamougué led negotiations with the strikers. In the midst of the strike, he was dismissed as Minister of Civil Service and Labor by President Idriss Déby on May 17, 1994.

In the 1996 presidential election, Kamougué stood as a candidate, taking second place in the first round on June 2 with 12.39% of the vote; in the second round, held on July 3, he was defeated by President Déby, taking 30.91% of the vote compared to Déby's 69.09%.

Following the 1997 parliamentary election, Kamougué's party, the Union for Renewal and Democracy, reached an agreement with Déby's ruling Patriotic Salvation Movement (MPS) on May 8, 1997, according to which Kamougué would become President of the National Assembly. He was elected to that position on May 9.

Kamougué ran again in the May 2001 presidential election. In March 2001, he was one of three presidential candidates who called for the election to be delayed and for the international community to delay funding for the election, describing it as a "masquerade" and a "travesty". The URD decided against boycotting the election and nominated Kamougué as its candidate at an ordinary party congress in early April. Kamougué accused Déby and the MPS of running Chad "in a catastrophic and disastrous manner". In the election, which took place on schedule, he took fourth place and 6.02% of the vote. He remained President of the National Assembly until 2002. In the April 2002 parliamentary election, he was re-elected to the National Assembly as an URD candidate from Sarh constituency in Barh Köh Department.

It was initially reported that Kamougué was one of the opposition leaders arrested during a battle between government forces and rebels in N'Djamena in early February 2008. On February 16, 2008, Minister of Communications Hourmadji Moussa Doumgor denied this, saying that Kamougué had not been arrested and that he was "hiding in the country's interior". It later emerged that Kamougué had escaped arrest. In a statement on February 26, he and another opposition leader, Saleh Kebzabo, released a statement calling for "the immediate convening of an all-inclusive national dialogue", the release of the three opposition leaders who had been arrested and an international inquiry into the arrests, and an immediate cease-fire. Kamougué returned to N'Djamena from Cameroon on March 22, having received guarantees of safety from the authorities.

In the government of Prime Minister Youssouf Saleh Abbas, which was announced on April 23, 2008, Kamougué was appointed as Minister of National Defense. He was one of four members of the Coordination of Political Parties for Defense of the Constitution opposition coalition to be included in the government.

On 9 May 2011, Kamougué died in Koumra, southern Chad, while campaigning for his party's candidates in a parliamentary by-election.
