= Patriotic Salvation Movement =

Ruling party in Chad (since 1990)

Patriotic Salvation Movement Mouvement patriotique du salut
- Arabic name: الحركة الوطنية للإنقاذ
- Abbreviation: MPS
- President: Haroun Kabadi
- Secretary-General: Aziz Mahamat Saleh
- Honorary President: Mahamat Déby
- Founders: Idriss Déby; Abbas Koty; Bada Abbas Maldoum; Hissein Dassert
- Founded: 11 March 1990; 36 years ago
- Merger of: 1 April Movement; MOSONAT; FAT/MRP
- Headquarters: N'Djamena
- Ideology: Nationalism; Militarism; Secularism; Mixed economy (in practice); Historical: Economic liberalization (in practice); Privatization (in practice); Market economy (in the 1990s in practice); Socialism (initially)
- Political position: Big tent; Historical: Left-wing
- Slogan: Mourir pour le Salut ("Dying for Salvation")
- National Assembly: 124 / 188 (66%)
- Senate: 63 / 69 (91%)

Website
- www.mps-tchad.org

The Patriotic Salvation Movement (French: Mouvement patriotique du salut, MPS; Arabic: الحركة الوطنية للإنقاذ, romanized: al-ḥarakah al-waṭaniyah lil-inqāḏ) is a ruling political party in Chad. The party's rule has been described as authoritarian.

== History ==
After Idriss Déby, an army commander who participated in an unsuccessful plot against President Hissène Habré in 1989, fled to Sudan, he and his supporters, known as the 1 April Movement, operated from Sudan with Libyan backing and carried out attacks across the border into Chad. The MPS was founded in Sudan on 11 March 1990 through the merger of the 1 April Movement with other anti-Habre groups in exile. After a successful offensive in November 1990, Déby and the MPS came to power on 2 December 1990, when their forces entered N'Djamena, the Chadian capital.

Idriss Déby was the MPS candidate in the 1996 presidential election and won in a second round. He was again the MPS candidate in the presidential election of 20 May 2001, receiving 63.2% of the vote. In the parliamentary election held on 21 April 2002, the MPS won according to IPU Parline 113 out of 155 seats. In the May 2006 presidential election, Déby was re-elected with 64.7% of the vote, as well as in 2011, 2016, and 2021.

After Idriss Déby was shot and died during the Northern Chad offensive in 2021, he was succeeded by his son Mahamat Déby Itno, with the country's constitution being suspended. In the December 2024 elections, the party received 124 out of 188 legislative seats in a process widely derided as fraudulent and only presenting the appearance of democracy.

On 25 January 2025, Mahamat Idriss Deby called an extraordinary congress of the MPS for 29 January 2025.

== Electoral history ==
=== Presidential elections ===
| Election | Party candidate | First round | | Second round | | Result |
| Election | Party candidate | Votes | % | Votes | % | Result |
|---|---|---|---|---|---|---|
| 1996 | Idriss Déby | 1,016,277 | 43.82% | 2,102,907 | 69.09% | Elected ✓ |
| 2001 | Idriss Déby | 1,533,509 | 63.17% | —N/a | —N/a | Elected ✓ |
| 2006 | Idriss Déby | 1,863,042 | 64.67% | —N/a | —N/a | Elected ✓ |
| 2011 | Idriss Déby | 2,503,813 | 88.66% | —N/a | —N/a | Elected ✓ |
| 2016 | Idriss Déby | 2,219,352 | 59.92% | —N/a | —N/a | Elected ✓ |
| 2021 (Note: After the 2021 election Idriss Déby died before the inauguration due injury while leading troop during the Northern Chad offensive.) | Idriss Déby | 3,663,431 | 79.32% | —N/a | —N/a | Elected ✓ |
| 2024 | Mahamat Déby | 3,777,279 | 61.00% | —N/a | —N/a | Elected ✓ |

=== National Assembly elections ===
| Election | Leader | First round | | Second round | | Seats | +/– | Position | Result |
| Election | Leader | Votes | % | Votes | % | Seats | +/– | Position | Result |
|---|---|---|---|---|---|---|---|---|---|
| 1997 | Idriss Déby | 504,045 | 39.96% | 262,060 | 34.40% | 65 / 125 | New | 1st | Majority government |
| 2002 | Nagoum Yamassoum | | | —N/a | —N/a | 113 / 155 | ▲48 | 1st | Supermajority government |
| 2011 | Haroun Kabadi | in alliance with RDP and RNDP | | | | 134 / 188 | ▲21 | 1st | MPS–RDP–RNDP coalition government |
| 2024 | Haroun Kabadi | 1,814,429 | 45.18% | —N/a | —N/a | 124 / 188 | ▼10 | 1st | Supermajority government |

== See also ==
- Agnes Allafi
