= National Union for Democracy and Renewal =

Political party in Chad

National Union for Democracy and Renewal: Union nationale pour la démocratie et le renouveau; الاتحاد الوطني للديمقراطية والتجديد
- Abbreviation: UNDR
- President: Saleh Kebzabo
- Secretary: Bouzabo Patchili
- Founded: 12 April 1992
- Ideology: Social democracy
- Political position: Centre-left
- International affiliation: Socialist International
- National Assembly: 7 / 188

Website
- www.undr-tchad.org

The National Union for Democracy and Renewal (French: Union nationale pour la démocratie et le renouveau; abbreviated UNDR) is a political party in Chad led by Saleh Kebzabo. The UNDR is a constituent party of the Coordination of Political Parties for the Defense of the Constitution (CPDC), the main opposition coalition opposed to the rule of former president Idriss Déby.

In the 1997 parliamentary election, UNDR won 15 out of 125 seats. In the parliamentary election held on 21 April 2002, the party won five out of 155 seats.

Kebzabo was the UNDR's candidate in the June 1996 presidential election, placing third with 8.61% of the vote. He was also the party's candidate in the presidential election held on 20 May 2001, winning 7.0% of the vote.

Saleh Kebzabo, leader of the UNDR, was appointed prime minister by president Mahamat Déby on 12 October 2022. Kebzabo would serve in this post until 1 January 2024.

== Election results ==
=== Presidential elections ===
Election	Party candidate	Votes	%	Votes	%	Result
Election	Party candidate	First round		Second round		Result
1996	Saleh Kebzabo	199,691	8.61%	—N/a		Lost
2001	Saleh Kebzabo	169,917	7.00%	—N/a		Lost
2016	Saleh Kebzabo	473,074	12.77%	—N/a		Lost
2021	Saleh Kebzabo	47,518	1.03%	—N/a		Lost

=== National Assembly elections ===
Election	Party leader	Votes	%	Votes	%	Seats	+/–	Position	Government
Election	Party leader	First round		Second round		Seats	+/–	Position	Government
1997	Saleh Kebzabo	84,372	6.69%	13,140	1.72%	15 / 125	New	▲3rd	Opposition
2002	Saleh Kebzabo			—N/a		5 / 155	▼10	▼4th	Opposition
2011	Saleh Kebzabo	in alliance with PLD				12 / 187	▲7	▲2nd	Opposition
2002	Saleh Kebzabo	156,758	3.90%	—N/a		7 / 155	▼5	▼4th	Opposition
