= Party for Integral Democracy and Independence =

The Party for Integral Democracy and Independence (PDI, French: Parti pour la démocratie et l'indépendance intégrales) is a political party in Chad founded in 1997.

== History ==
PDI was founded in 1997 by Julien Béassemda, a candidate in the 2016 Chadian presidential elections. Julien died in April 2018, after which PDI has been led by his daughter Lydie Beassemda.

Under PDI, Lydie became the first woman to run for Chads presidency in the 2021 Chadian presidential elections, winning 3.16 percent of the vote. Lydie ran again in 2024 Chadian presidential elections winning 0.96 percent of the vote.
