= Union for Democracy and the Republic (Chad) =

Political party in Chad

The Union for Democracy and Republic (French: Union pour la démocratie et la République or UDR) is a Chadian political party founded in 1992. In March the party elected as its president Jean Alingué Bawoyeu, who had just left the position of Prime Minister. In the parliamentary election of 1997 the party took 4 seats and initially supported the president Idriss Déby. Before the parliamentary elections, between 1995 and 1997, the Prime Minister was Koibla Djimasta, himself of the UDR. During the previous presidential elections held in 1996 the party's candidate, Alingué, gained most of his votes in his native Tandjilé Prefecture, where he obtained the 39.69% of the popular vote, but also came second in the capital N'Djamena, where he took 16,52%.

In the following parliamentary election held in 2002, the UDC boycotted the vote as it believed there were not sufficient guarantees of a free and fair election, in particular having requested to redo the electoral register.
