= National Assembly of Chad =

Lower house of the Parliament of Chad

Coordinates: 12°07′37″N 15°04′45″E

National Assembly of Chad Assemblée nationale du Tchad جمعية تشاد الوطنية
- 4th Legislature

Type
- Type: Lower house Unicameral (1960–2025)

History
- Founded: 1960
- New session started: 4 February 2025

Leadership
- President: Ali Kolotou Tchaïmi, MPS since 4 February 2025

Structure
- Seats: 188
- Political groups: Government (124): MPS (124); Opposition (64): RDNT (11); RDP (8); UNDR (7); PLD (3); UDT (1); URD (2); VIVA (1); CNDS (1); Others (30)
- Length of term: 5 years

Elections
- Voting system: (Note: The 188 members of the National Assembly are elected from 128 constituencies, including four constituencies for voters abroad. In the 83 constituencies with one seat first-past-the-post voting is used. In the 45 multi-member constituencies ranging in size from two to five seats, a party receiving over 50% of the vote wins all the seats available; if no party receives over 50% of the vote, seats are allocated proportionally using the largest remainders method.)
- Last election: 29 December 2024
- Next election: 2029

Meeting place
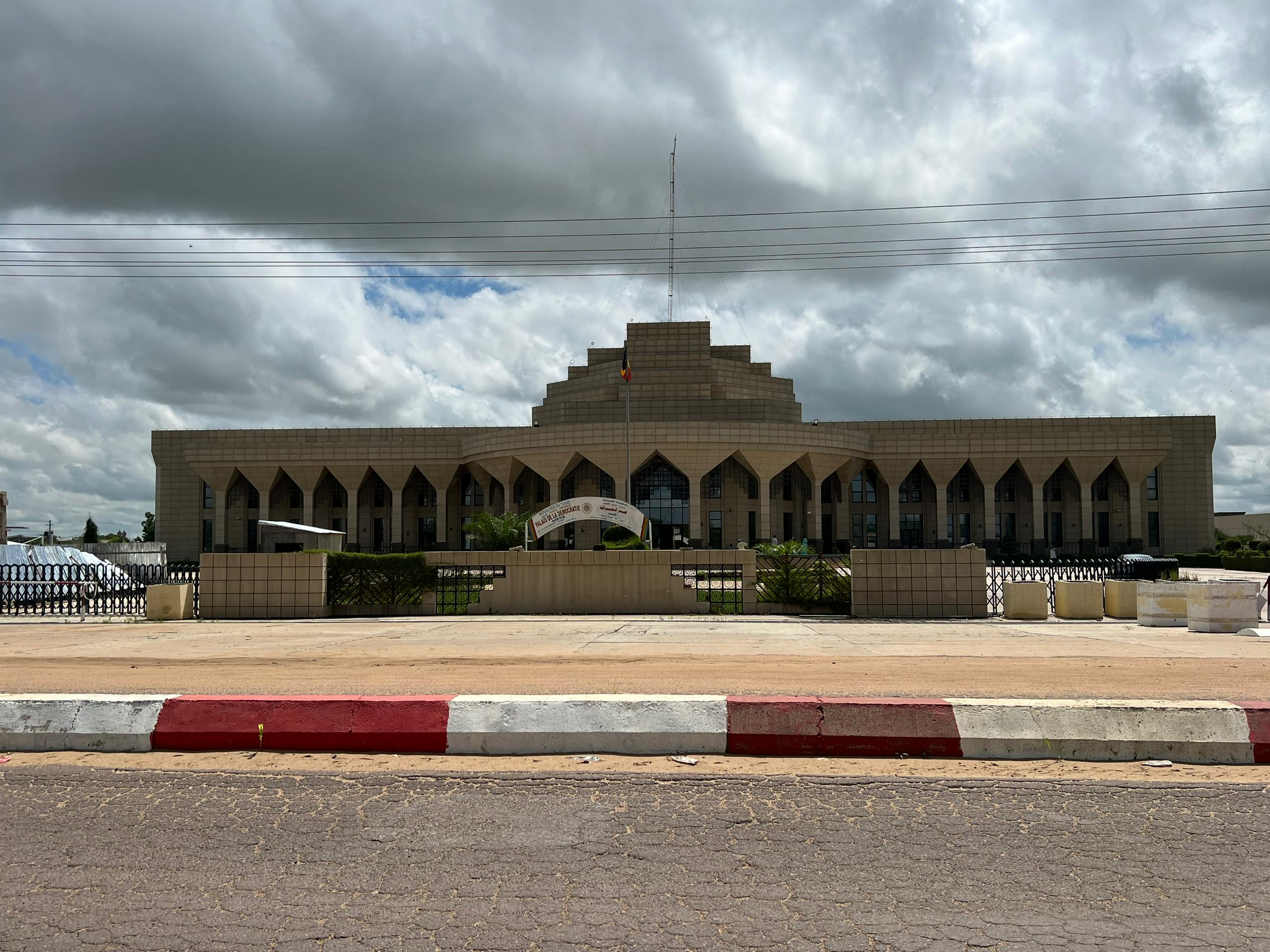
- Palais de la Démocratie, N'Djamena

Website
- www.assemblee-nationale.td/W3////

The National Assembly (French: Assemblée nationale; Arabic: الجمعية الوطنية) is the lower house of the Parliament of Chad. Deputies of the National Assembly are elected for a five-year term.

== Legislative history ==
Colonial Chad had four assemblies from 1947 to 1959. They were the Representative Council (1947) and the Territorial and Legislative Assemblies of 1952, 1957 and 1959.

The Representative Council from 1947 to 1952 had 30 members elected for five years. It had administrative and financial powers. It included white French and African councillors. Its speakers were Albert Blanchard from 1947 to 1951 and William Tardrew from 1951 to 1952.

The Territorial Assembly had 45 members first elected in March 1952. The members were conservative right (UDT-RPF) and progressive left (PPT/RDA and Independent Socialist Party of Chad). William Tardrew was the speaker from 1952 to 1957, and Sahoulba Gontchomé from 1957 to 1959. The assembly invested the first Governing Council of Chad in May 1957.

The unicameral Legislative Assembly was established on 31 May 1959. The National Assembly was the legislature under civilian authoritarian rule of Ngarta Tombalbaye from 1960 to 1975. The multiparty system was abolished in January 1962.

Under military rule from 1975 to 1993, the Provisional Consultative Chambers served as Chad's legislative body. The assemblies were National Council of Union (1978), the National Consultative Council (1982) and the Provisional Council of the Republic (1991).

The Superior Transitional Council had legislative powers from 1993 to 1997, until the elected National Assembly took its place in 1997. The number of members on the National Assembly increased from 125 in 1997 to 155 in 2002 and 188 in 2011. On 20 April 2021, after President Idriss Déby was killed, the National Assembly was dissolved and its functions were assumed by the Transitional Military Council, a junta led by Déby’s son. The National Assembly was replaced by military rule in 2021. National Transitional Council took place in October 2021.

In 2024, the new constitution of Chad provides a bicameral legislature consisting of the Senate and the National Assembly. The newly elected National Assembly replaced National Transitional Council in February 2025.

== Latest elections ==
Party	Votes	%	Seats
Patriotic Salvation Movement	1,814,429	45.18	124
National Rally of Chadian Democrats	279,653	6.96	11
Rally for Democracy and Progress	242,821	6.05	8
National Union for Democracy and Renewal	156,758	3.90	7
Al Wassat	78,043	1.94	1
Reformist Party	72,344	1.80	1
Party for Liberty and Development	61,090	1.52	2
Movement for Unity and Renewal	50,439	1.26	1
Chadian Convention for Peace and Development	50,094	1.25	1
Union for the Refoundation of Chad	41,710	1.04	0
Chadian Democratic Union	41,258	1.03	1
Peace and Social Cohesion Party	38,948	0.97	3
Party for Liberty and Development/Reformist Party	38,814	0.97	1
Union for Renewal and Democracy	35,852	0.89	2
National Rally for Development and Progress	32,022	0.80	1
National Action for Development	28,985	0.72	1
Party for Integral Democracy and Independence	28,340	0.71	1
Movement of Chadian Patriots for the Republic	27,391	0.68	2
Party for Rally and Equity in Chad	26,649	0.66	1
Action for the Republic, Democracy and Development	26,159	0.65	1
Democratic and Socialist Party for Alternation	25,991	0.65	1
Movement for Democracy and Socialism in Chad	23,990	0.60	1
Popular Action Framework for Solidarity and Unity of the Republic	23,185	0.58	1
National People's Convention	22,560	0.56	0
National Movement for Change in Chad	20,878	0.52	1
Al Nassour	20,804	0.52	1
Union of Democratic and Republican Forces	19,254	0.48	1
AS	17,463	0.43	0
Chadian Socialist Action for Renewal	17,382	0.43	1
Les Elites	17,341	0.43	0
Union of Democratic Forces	15,416	0.38	1
Ensemble pour la République	15,028	0.37	0
Movement for Equality and Citizens' Rally	14,374	0.36	1
Gathering of the United Sons of Chad for Development	14,264	0.36	0
National Democratic and Social Convention	14,253	0.35	1
A New Day	13,665	0.34	1
Horizon Movement for Democracy	13,610	0.34	0
Party of Democrats and Socialists	13,579	0.34	1
Party of Democrats for Renewal	13,101	0.33	0
United Chad Party for Development	12,581	0.31	0
Chadian National Social Democratic Congress	12,293	0.31	0
Democratic Party of the Chadian People	12,110	0.30	1
Federation, Action for the Republic	11,684	0.29	0
National Democratic and Social Convention/Al Nassour	11,331	0.28	0
United People	10,801	0.27	0
New Breath for the Republic	10,573	0.26	0
Popular Front for Liberation	10,310	0.26	1
Rally for Progress and Social Justice	9,678	0.24	0
Dynamic Republican Alliance	9,403	0.23	1
Union of Resistance Forces	9,184	0.23	0
UPPP	8,484	0.21	0
Alliance 43	8,463	0.21	0
La Nouvelle Génération	8,032	0.20	0
Artisans of a New Chad	7,976	0.20	0
A Nation for All	7,735	0.19	0
Party for Unity and Reconstruction	7,351	0.18	0
Convention for Democracy and Federalism	7,059	0.18	0
African Democratic Party	6,969	0.17	0
Movement for the Renewal of Chad	6,805	0.17	0
RDR	6,739	0.17	0
People's Party for Change	6,583	0.16	0
Alliance for Democracy, Integrity and Freedom	6,562	0.16	0
AFR	6,486	0.16	0
Party for Unity and Democracy	6,456	0.16	0
National Alliance for Democracy and Change	6,430	0.16	0
National Action for Development/Renovated	6,286	0.16	0
Popular Front for the Federation	6,188	0.15	0
Union of Democrats for Development	6,155	0.15	0
Party for Democracy and Reconciliation in Chad	5,898	0.15	0
Party for Democratic Renewal in Chad	5,887	0.15	0
AFD	5,773	0.14	0
Al Wihda	5,571	0.14	0
Convergence for Social Democracy	5,498	0.14	0
Al Takhadoum	5,280	0.13	0
Nida Al Watan	5,122	0.13	0
Action for Renewal of Chad	4,957	0.12	0
Rally for the Republic – Lingui	4,754	0.12	0
Popular Front for the Liberation of the South	4,716	0.12	0
Socialist Party of Chad	4,689	0.12	1
Les Leaders	4,456	0.11	1
March for the Reestablishment of Harmony	4,395	0.11	0
Union of the Chadian People for National Reconciliation	4,203	0.10	0
Movement for Rally and Justice	4,121	0.10	0
People's Party for the Strengthening of Democracy	3,999	0.10	0
Al Djamaa	3,953	0.10	0
Liberal Party for the Emancipation and Progress of Chad	3,750	0.09	0
Citizen in Search of Happiness	3,729	0.09	0
National Democratic Union for Change	3,659	0.09	0
RA (Rally for Democracy and Progress/Action for Renewal of Chad)	3,556	0.09	0
MPD	3,440	0.09	0
UPPP/FORT	3,432	0.09	0
Party for Democracy and Social Justice	3,367	0.08	0
Party for Justice and Freedom	3,325	0.08	0
Rally of the People of Chad	3,175	0.08	0
Chadian Progressive Party	3,161	0.08	0
UNDR/Chadian Social Democrats Front	3,150	0.08	0
Party for the Development and Continuity of Chad	3,111	0.08	0
PPST	2,870	0.07	0
RARE	2,841	0.07	0
Le Republicain	2,742	0.07	0
Movement for the National Reconstruction of Chad	2,712	0.07	0
Emergence for the Development of Chad	2,633	0.07	0
CAP SUR/Rally for the Republic – Lingui	2,633	0.07	0
Chadian Alliance for Development	2,571	0.06	1
Radiodiffusion Nationale Tchadienne	2,549	0.06	0
People's Party for Freedom	2,522	0.06	0
Youth Movement for Economic and Social Recovery	2,491	0.06	0
Alliance of Resistant Democrats	2,490	0.06	0
Les Serviteurs	2,473	0.06	0
Party for National Unity, Democracy, Dialogue and Development of Chad	2,470	0.06	0
People's Party for Democratic Change	2,460	0.06	0
Attayar Al-Islahi	2,417	0.06	0
Union for Democracy, Development and Justice in Chad	2,406	0.06	0
National Salvation Movement of Chad	2,383	0.06	0
National Demobilization and Reintegration Program	2,364	0.06	0
Ensemble pour le 9ème	2,322	0.06	0
Patriotic Front for Democracy	2,304	0.06	0
National Convergence for the Salvation of the People	2,291	0.06	0
Mojes	2,266	0.06	0
Chadian Party for Renewal and Development	2,221	0.06	0
Union of Progressive Workers for Cohesion	2,194	0.05	0
nouvelle generation pol	2,177	0.05	0
African Democratic Movement	2,161	0.05	0
Tawafouk	2,123	0.05	0
Chadian Action for Unity and Socialism	2,120	0.05	0
Union for Democracy and the Republic/Social Democratic Party	2,021	0.05	0
Union for the National Democratic Upsurge	2,001	0.05	0
Popular Movement for Reform	1,984	0.05	0
Union for Peace and Democracy	1,954	0.05	0
National Convention for Peace and Development in Chad/Action	1,946	0.05	0
Citizens Party of Chad	1,912	0.05	0
Federation, Action for the Republic Bis	1,853	0.05	0
MCC	1,830	0.05	0
New Vision	1,824	0.05	0
Alliance Baobab	1,797	0.04	0
CNAD	1,794	0.04	0
RDDP	1,738	0.04	0
Revolutionary Movement for Democracy and Peace	1,711	0.04	0
People's Alliance for the Republic/Trompette	1,677	0.04	0
Party for Democratic Development and Freedoms	1,661	0.04	0
People's Movement for Justice and Equality	1,625	0.04	0
People's Movement for Alternation	1,614	0.04	0
Rally for Justice and the Environment	1,571	0.04	0
Generation Consciente	1,557	0.04	0
Les Refondeurs	1,529	0.04	0
People's Movement for Democracy in Chad	1,510	0.04	0
National Movement for Democracy and Alternation in Chad	1,443	0.04	0
Socialist Alliance for Integral Renewal	1,441	0.04	0
Chadian People's Liberation Party	1,438	0.04	0
Rally of Nationalists for Democracy and Development	1,418	0.04	0
People's Alliance for the Republic	1,389	0.03	0
Chadian Union for Renaissance	1,380	0.03	0
Party of Chadian Socialist Intellectuals for Evolution	1,360	0.03	0
RDT/C	1,324	0.03	0
CSDT	1,304	0.03	0
The Reformers	1,278	0.03	0
Party for Reform and Economic Independence	1,264	0.03	0
National Movement for Reconstruction/Democratic Rally	1,215	0.03	0
Rally for Democracy and Socialism in Chad	1,096	0.03	0
Rally for Democracy and Progress/Renewed	1,060	0.03	0
New Breath for the Republic/Popular Movement for Reform	1,014	0.03	0
Popular Party for Social Justice/Workers Front for the Redemption of Chad	995	0.02	0
MJL	994	0.02	0
Party for National Unity, Dialogue and Democracy	945	0.02	0
Union of Forces for Change and Justice	921	0.02	0
Social Democratic Party	898	0.02	0
Chadian Democratic Party	884	0.02	0
Rally of People for Democratic Alternation	872	0.02	0
Alliance of the Forces of Progress	836	0.02	0
Union for the Democratic Republic of Chad	803	0.02	0
Popular Party for Justice and Equality	730	0.02	0
UFDD/F1	702	0.02	0
Movement for Democracy and Justice in Chad	566	0.01	0
Movement for Freedom, Peace and Renewal in Chad	476	0.01	0
PPDST	419	0.01	0
PCDD	403	0.01	0
Communist Party of Work to the People of Chad	385	0.01	0
Movement of Upright and Democratic Citizens	264	0.01	0
ASR	175	0.00	0
Movement for Justice and Peace in Chad	165	0.00	0
African Socialist Movement/Renewed	57	0.00	0
National Union	20	0.00	0
Total	4,016,020	100.00	188
Valid votes	4,016,020	95.05	
Invalid/blank votes	209,294	4.95	
Total votes	4,225,314	100.00	
Registered voters/turnout	8,066,326	52.38	

== See also ==
- Politics of Chad
- List of presidents of the National Assembly of Chad
- List of legislatures by country
