= Action for Renewal of Chad =

Political party in Chad

The Action for Renewal of Chad (French: Action pour le renouveau du Tchad; Arabic: العمل من أجل تجديد تشاد) is a political party in Chad. In the legislative elections of 2011 the party won one seat.
