= National Rally for Development and Progress =

Political party in Chad

The National Rally for Development and Progress (French: Rassemblement national pour le développement et le progrès, also known as VIVA) is a political party in Chad, led by Delwa Kassiré Koumakoye. It was founded in early 1992, with Koumakoye as its president.

In the parliamentary election held on 21 April 2002, the party won five out of 155 seats; all five of these were in Kélo constituency in Tandjilé Ouest Department, where the party won all of the available seats. In the May 2006 presidential election, its candidate, Koumakoye, won 15.13% of the vote. Koumakoye was Prime Minister from February 2007 to April 2008.
