= List of political parties in Chad =

This article lists political parties in Chad. Chad is a dominant-party state, with the Patriotic Salvation Movement (MPS) having been in power since the 1990 Chadian coup d'état. Opposition parties are allowed, but are widely considered to have no real chance of gaining power.

== Parties ==
=== Parliamentary parties ===
Party	Abbr.	Ideology	Assembly	Senate
Patriotic Salvation Movement; Mouvement patriotique de salut	MPS	Nationalism; Authoritarianism; Militarism; Secularism	124 / 188	63 / 69
National Rally of Chadian Democrats; Rassemblement national pour la démocratie au Tchad – le Réveil	RNDT	Social democracy; Democratic socialism	11 / 188	2 / 69
Rally for Democracy and Progress; Rassemblement pour la démocratie et le progrès	RDP		8 / 188	0 / 69
National Union for Democracy and Renewal; Union nationale pour la démocratie et le renouveau	UNDR	Social democracy	7 / 188	0 / 69
Party for Liberties and Development; Parti pour les libertés et le développement	PLD	Social democracy	3 / 188	0 / 69
Union for Renewal and Democracy; Union pour le rénouveau et la démocratie	URD		2 / 188	1 / 69
Chadian Democratic Union; Union démocratique tchadienne	UDT		1 / 188	1 / 69
Party for Integral Democracy and Independence; Parti pour la démocratie et l'indépendance intégrales	PDI		1 / 188	1 / 69
National Rally for Development and Progress; VIVA–Rassemblement national pour le développement et le progrès	VIVA		1 / 188	0 / 69
National Democratic and Social Convention; Convention national démocratique et sociale	CNDS		1 / 188	0 / 69
Party for Unity and Equity in Chad; Parti pour le rassemblement et l'équité au Tchad	PRET	Social democracy	0 / 188	1 / 69

- Federation, Action for the Republic (Fédération, action pour la république)
- Chadian Action for Unity and Socialism (Action Tchadienne pour l'unité et le socialisme)
- Action for Renewal of Chad (Action pour le renouveau du Tchad)
- People's Movement for Democracy in Chad (Mouvement populaire pour la démocratie au Tchad)
- National Democratic and Federal Convention (Convention nationale démocratique et fédérale)
- Rally for the Republic – Lingui (Rassemblement pour la République - Lingui)
- National Union (Union nationale)
- Rally of Democratic Forces in Chad (Rassemblement des forces démocratiques au Tchad)

=== Other parties ===
- Renewed African Socialist Movement
- Socialist Party without Borders (Parti Socialiste sans Frontières)
- The Transformers (Les Transformateurs)
- Communist Party of Labor for the People of Chad (Parti communiste du travail au peuple du Tchad)

=== Defunct parties ===
- Chadian Democratic Union (Union Démocratique Tchadienne)
- Chadian National Union (Union Nationale Tchadienne)
- Chadian Progressive Party (Parti Progressiste Tchadienne)
- Chadian Social Action (Action Sociale Tchadienne)

== See also ==
- Lists of political parties
