= 2024 Chadian parliamentary election =

- 29 December 2024
- All 188 seats in National Assembly; 95 seats needed for a majority
- Turnout: 52.38%
Party	Leader	Vote %	Seats
MPS	Haroun Kabadi	45.18	124
RNDT–Le Réveil	Albert Pahimi Padacké	6.96	11
RDP	Mahamat Allahou Taher	6.05	8
UNDR	Saleh Kebzabo	3.90	7
PLD		1.52	2
PCS		0.97	3
URD	Sande Ngaryimbé	0.89	2
MPTR		0.68	2
Parties with one seat		18.42	29
This lists parties that won seats. See the complete results below.

Parliamentary elections were held in Chad on 29 December 2024, alongside elections for regional and local offices. The first parliamentary elections held since 2011, they were also first since the death of long-time ruler Idriss Déby in 2021, and the accession to leadership of his son, Mahamat Déby, first as leader of a military junta then as president in his own right, laying the groundwork for a hereditary dictatorship.

== Background ==
The previous parliamentary term began in June 2011 following the February 2011 parliamentary elections and was originally scheduled to end in June 2015 but was extended. President Idriss Déby announced on 2 February 2017 that the elections would be delayed because the government did not have sufficient funds in the midst of an economic slump, saying "When we have resources, we can hold parliamentary elections". He also urged the opposition to engage in dialogue and "stop cultivating hatred that results in dividing the country".

In June 2017 members of the FONAC opposition coalition argued that the National Assembly became illegitimate by continuing to sit beyond 21 June, two years after the extension of the parliamentary term, and that deputies from the opposition should consequently resign. Opposition deputies led by Saleh Kebzabo responded that they would not resign, feeling that it would be more "useful" for them to remain in the National Assembly; however, they also said that the next election should be held promptly, dismissing Déby's view that the delay was necessary due to a lack of funds and that in the future the government should make every effort to hold elections on time.

The elections were later rescheduled to November 2018. When this deadline too was not met, a new one of May 2019 was proposed by the government. The new National Independent Elections Commission (CENI) was sworn in by the Supreme Court on 4 April 2019 despite protests by segments of the opposition regarding its impartiality. On 5 April, the Coordination des Partis Politiques pour la Défense de la Constitution (CPDC) comprising a dozen opposition parties controlling 31 seats in the 188-seat National Assembly rejected the swearing-in, calling it "illegally constituted, null and void and of no effect." The country's election board said "the realistic time frame for holding legislative elections is the first quarter of 2020". At the beginning of that year a date was set for 9 August 2020, shortly thereafter amended to 13 December, citing increased attacks by Boko Haram around Lake Chad. With the COVID-19 pandemic the election was postponed yet again to April, then October 2021, and later September 2022. The junta later announced a further postponement of elections for two years, scheduling elections for around October 2024.

On 21 August 2024 the National Election Management Agency (ANGE) announced that parliamentary and local elections would be held on 29 December 2024. The submission of candidacies ran from 19 to 28 October, while final election results are expected on 3 February 2025. On 13 November, ANGE released a provisional list of candidates, in which it rejected the applications of 46 of 179 political parties and coalitions as well as 103 of 1,260 individuals. Among those disqualified were the ruling MPS's secretary general, Mahamat Zen Bada, citing a previous conviction for forgery, and five other MPS officials, who were also disqualified on similar grounds. On 25 November the Constitutional Council approved 1,329 candidates.

In October 2024 the country's largest opposition party, Les Transformateurs, and 15 other opposition parties, said that they would boycott the election, citing concerns about a "corrupt" electoral register and a lack of guarantees that the election would be free and fair.

== Electoral system ==
The 188 members of the National Assembly are elected from 128 constituencies, including four constituencies for voters abroad. In the 83 constituencies with one seat first-past-the-post voting is used. In the 45 multi-member constituencies ranging in size from two to five seats, a party receiving over 50% of the vote wins all the seats available; if no party receives over 50% of the vote, seats are allocated proportionally using the largest remainders method.

The minimum voting age is 18. All Chadian citizens not prohibited from voting by the Electoral Code are eligible to participate.

For the 2024 elections around eight million people were registered to vote.

== Conduct ==
Voting began at 06:00 and ended at 18:00. The opposition Democratic Party of the Chadian People (PDPT) accused the MPS of establishing "fraud networks" and said that more than a thousand ballots meant to be used in Bongor had disappeared. Coverage of the election by domestic private media outlets was also restricted after the government refused to grant subsidies. More than 100 international observers and representatives of political parties were deployed to monitor the vote. Early voting was held on 28 December for members of the Chad National Army and nomads, with ANGE noting a turnout of more than 72% among soldiers and 54% among nomads. By noon on 29 December however, overall turnout was at 38%.

== Results ==
Provisional results were published on 12 January 2025, showing that the ruling Patriotic Salvation Movement party won 124 out of 188 seats on a voter turnout of 52%.

Party	Votes	%	Seats
Patriotic Salvation Movement	1,814,429	45.18	124
National Rally of Chadian Democrats	279,653	6.96	11
Rally for Democracy and Progress	242,821	6.05	8
National Union for Democracy and Renewal	156,758	3.90	7
Al Wassat	78,043	1.94	1
Reformist Party	72,344	1.80	1
Party for Liberty and Development	61,090	1.52	2
Movement for Unity and Renewal	50,439	1.26	1
Chadian Convention for Peace and Development	50,094	1.25	1
Union for the Refoundation of Chad	41,710	1.04	0
Chadian Democratic Union	41,258	1.03	1
Peace and Social Cohesion Party	38,948	0.97	3
Party for Liberty and Development/Reformist Party	38,814	0.97	1
Union for Renewal and Democracy	35,852	0.89	2
National Rally for Development and Progress	32,022	0.80	1
National Action for Development	28,985	0.72	1
Party for Integral Democracy and Independence	28,340	0.71	1
Movement of Chadian Patriots for the Republic	27,391	0.68	2
Party for Rally and Equity in Chad	26,649	0.66	1
Action for the Republic, Democracy and Development	26,159	0.65	1
Democratic and Socialist Party for Alternation	25,991	0.65	1
Movement for Democracy and Socialism in Chad	23,990	0.60	1
Popular Action Framework for Solidarity and Unity of the Republic	23,185	0.58	1
National People's Convention	22,560	0.56	0
National Movement for Change in Chad	20,878	0.52	1
Al Nassour	20,804	0.52	1
Union of Democratic and Republican Forces	19,254	0.48	1
AS	17,463	0.43	0
Chadian Socialist Action for Renewal	17,382	0.43	1
Les Elites	17,341	0.43	0
Union of Democratic Forces	15,416	0.38	1
Ensemble pour la République	15,028	0.37	0
Movement for Equality and Citizens' Rally	14,374	0.36	1
Gathering of the United Sons of Chad for Development	14,264	0.36	0
National Democratic and Social Convention	14,253	0.35	1
A New Day	13,665	0.34	1
Horizon Movement for Democracy	13,610	0.34	0
Party of Democrats and Socialists	13,579	0.34	1
Party of Democrats for Renewal	13,101	0.33	0
United Chad Party for Development	12,581	0.31	0
Chadian National Social Democratic Congress	12,293	0.31	0
Democratic Party of the Chadian People	12,110	0.30	1
Federation, Action for the Republic	11,684	0.29	0
National Democratic and Social Convention/Al Nassour	11,331	0.28	0
United People	10,801	0.27	0
New Breath for the Republic	10,573	0.26	0
Popular Front for Liberation	10,310	0.26	1
Rally for Progress and Social Justice	9,678	0.24	0
Dynamic Republican Alliance	9,403	0.23	1
Union of Resistance Forces	9,184	0.23	0
UPPP	8,484	0.21	0
Alliance 43	8,463	0.21	0
La Nouvelle Génération	8,032	0.20	0
Artisans of a New Chad	7,976	0.20	0
A Nation for All	7,735	0.19	0
Party for Unity and Reconstruction	7,351	0.18	0
Convention for Democracy and Federalism	7,059	0.18	0
African Democratic Party	6,969	0.17	0
Movement for the Renewal of Chad	6,805	0.17	0
RDR	6,739	0.17	0
People's Party for Change	6,583	0.16	0
Alliance for Democracy, Integrity and Freedom	6,562	0.16	0
AFR	6,486	0.16	0
Party for Unity and Democracy	6,456	0.16	0
National Alliance for Democracy and Change	6,430	0.16	0
National Action for Development/Renovated	6,286	0.16	0
Popular Front for the Federation	6,188	0.15	0
Union of Democrats for Development	6,155	0.15	0
Party for Democracy and Reconciliation in Chad	5,898	0.15	0
Party for Democratic Renewal in Chad	5,887	0.15	0
AFD	5,773	0.14	0
Al Wihda	5,571	0.14	0
Convergence for Social Democracy	5,498	0.14	0
Al Takhadoum	5,280	0.13	0
Nida Al Watan	5,122	0.13	0
Action for Renewal of Chad	4,957	0.12	0
Rally for the Republic – Lingui	4,754	0.12	0
Popular Front for the Liberation of the South	4,716	0.12	0
Socialist Party of Chad	4,689	0.12	1
Les Leaders	4,456	0.11	1
March for the Reestablishment of Harmony	4,395	0.11	0
Union of the Chadian People for National Reconciliation	4,203	0.10	0
Movement for Rally and Justice	4,121	0.10	0
People's Party for the Strengthening of Democracy	3,999	0.10	0
Al Djamaa	3,953	0.10	0
Liberal Party for the Emancipation and Progress of Chad	3,750	0.09	0
Citizen in Search of Happiness	3,729	0.09	0
National Democratic Union for Change	3,659	0.09	0
RA (Rally for Democracy and Progress/Action for Renewal of Chad)	3,556	0.09	0
MPD	3,440	0.09	0
UPPP/FORT	3,432	0.09	0
Party for Democracy and Social Justice	3,367	0.08	0
Party for Justice and Freedom	3,325	0.08	0
Rally of the People of Chad	3,175	0.08	0
Chadian Progressive Party	3,161	0.08	0
UNDR/Chadian Social Democrats Front	3,150	0.08	0
Party for the Development and Continuity of Chad	3,111	0.08	0
PPST	2,870	0.07	0
RARE	2,841	0.07	0
Le Republicain	2,742	0.07	0
Movement for the National Reconstruction of Chad	2,712	0.07	0
Emergence for the Development of Chad	2,633	0.07	0
CAP SUR/Rally for the Republic – Lingui	2,633	0.07	0
Chadian Alliance for Development	2,571	0.06	1
Radiodiffusion Nationale Tchadienne	2,549	0.06	0
People's Party for Freedom	2,522	0.06	0
Youth Movement for Economic and Social Recovery	2,491	0.06	0
Alliance of Resistant Democrats	2,490	0.06	0
Les Serviteurs	2,473	0.06	0
Party for National Unity, Democracy, Dialogue and Development of Chad	2,470	0.06	0
People's Party for Democratic Change	2,460	0.06	0
Attayar Al-Islahi	2,417	0.06	0
Union for Democracy, Development and Justice in Chad	2,406	0.06	0
National Salvation Movement of Chad	2,383	0.06	0
National Demobilization and Reintegration Program	2,364	0.06	0
Ensemble pour le 9ème	2,322	0.06	0
Patriotic Front for Democracy	2,304	0.06	0
National Convergence for the Salvation of the People	2,291	0.06	0
Mojes	2,266	0.06	0
Chadian Party for Renewal and Development	2,221	0.06	0
Union of Progressive Workers for Cohesion	2,194	0.05	0
nouvelle generation pol	2,177	0.05	0
African Democratic Movement	2,161	0.05	0
Tawafouk	2,123	0.05	0
Chadian Action for Unity and Socialism	2,120	0.05	0
Union for Democracy and the Republic/Social Democratic Party	2,021	0.05	0
Union for the National Democratic Upsurge	2,001	0.05	0
Popular Movement for Reform	1,984	0.05	0
Union for Peace and Democracy	1,954	0.05	0
National Convention for Peace and Development in Chad/Action	1,946	0.05	0
Citizens Party of Chad	1,912	0.05	0
Federation, Action for the Republic Bis	1,853	0.05	0
MCC	1,830	0.05	0
New Vision	1,824	0.05	0
Alliance Baobab	1,797	0.04	0
CNAD	1,794	0.04	0
RDDP	1,738	0.04	0
Revolutionary Movement for Democracy and Peace	1,711	0.04	0
People's Alliance for the Republic/Trompette	1,677	0.04	0
Party for Democratic Development and Freedoms	1,661	0.04	0
People's Movement for Justice and Equality	1,625	0.04	0
People's Movement for Alternation	1,614	0.04	0
Rally for Justice and the Environment	1,571	0.04	0
Generation Consciente	1,557	0.04	0
Les Refondeurs	1,529	0.04	0
People's Movement for Democracy in Chad	1,510	0.04	0
National Movement for Democracy and Alternation in Chad	1,443	0.04	0
Socialist Alliance for Integral Renewal	1,441	0.04	0
Chadian People's Liberation Party	1,438	0.04	0
Rally of Nationalists for Democracy and Development	1,418	0.04	0
People's Alliance for the Republic	1,389	0.03	0
Chadian Union for Renaissance	1,380	0.03	0
Party of Chadian Socialist Intellectuals for Evolution	1,360	0.03	0
RDT/C	1,324	0.03	0
CSDT	1,304	0.03	0
The Reformers	1,278	0.03	0
Party for Reform and Economic Independence	1,264	0.03	0
National Movement for Reconstruction/Democratic Rally	1,215	0.03	0
Rally for Democracy and Socialism in Chad	1,096	0.03	0
Rally for Democracy and Progress/Renewed	1,060	0.03	0
New Breath for the Republic/Popular Movement for Reform	1,014	0.03	0
Popular Party for Social Justice/Workers Front for the Redemption of Chad	995	0.02	0
MJL	994	0.02	0
Party for National Unity, Dialogue and Democracy	945	0.02	0
Union of Forces for Change and Justice	921	0.02	0
Social Democratic Party	898	0.02	0
Chadian Democratic Party	884	0.02	0
Rally of People for Democratic Alternation	872	0.02	0
Alliance of the Forces of Progress	836	0.02	0
Union for the Democratic Republic of Chad	803	0.02	0
Popular Party for Justice and Equality	730	0.02	0
UFDD/F1	702	0.02	0
Movement for Democracy and Justice in Chad	566	0.01	0
Movement for Freedom, Peace and Renewal in Chad	476	0.01	0
PPDST	419	0.01	0
PCDD	403	0.01	0
Communist Party of Work to the People of Chad	385	0.01	0
Movement of Upright and Democratic Citizens	264	0.01	0
ASR	175	0.00	0
Movement for Justice and Peace in Chad	165	0.00	0
African Socialist Movement/Renewed	57	0.00	0
National Union	20	0.00	0
Total	4,016,020	100.00	188
Valid votes	4,016,020	95.05	
Invalid/blank votes	209,294	4.95	
Total votes	4,225,314	100.00	
Registered voters/turnout	8,066,326	52.38	

=== Results by constituency ===
Results by constituency

Kleta
Party	Votes	%	Seats
Patriotic Salvation Movement	10,788	79.75	1
National Rally of Chadian Democrats	1,323	9.78	0
Rally for Democracy and Progress	951	7.03	0
Chadian Convention for Peace and Development	466	3.44	0
Total	13,528	100.00	1
Valid votes	13,528	91.03	
Invalid/blank votes	1,333	8.97	
Total votes	14,861	100.00	
Registered voters/turnout	19,803	75.04	
Source: ANGE

Barh-el-Gazel Est
Party	Votes	%	Seats
Patriotic Salvation Movement	15,384	74.59	1
Reformist Party	2,679	12.99	0
Union for the Refoundation of Chad	2,561	12.42	0
Total	20,624	100.00	1
Valid votes	20,624	98.87	
Invalid/blank votes	236	1.13	
Total votes	20,860	100.00	
Registered voters/turnout	35,363	58.99	
Source: ANGE

Barh-el-Gazel Ouest
Party	Votes	%	Seats
Patriotic Salvation Movement	16,894	51.89	1
Rally for Democracy and Progress	15,663	48.11	0
Total	32,557	100.00	1
Valid votes	32,557	98.34	
Invalid/blank votes	550	1.66	
Total votes	33,107	100.00	
Registered voters/turnout	46,406	71.34	
Source: ANGE

Barh-el-Gazel Sud
Party	Votes	%	Seats
Patriotic Salvation Movement	30,215	47.45	1
Rally for Democracy and Progress	23,953	37.61	1
Union of the Chadian People for National Reconciliation	4,203	6.60	0
Citizen in Search of Happiness	3,729	5.86	0
Chadian Convention for Peace and Development	1,581	2.48	0
Total	63,681	100.00	2
Valid votes	63,681	99.35	
Invalid/blank votes	417	0.65	
Total votes	64,098	100.00	
Registered voters/turnout	75,231	85.20	
Source: ANGE

Barh-el-Gazel Nord
Party	Votes	%	Seats
Patriotic Salvation Movement	22,399	100.00	1
Total	22,399	100.00	1
Valid votes	22,399	98.80	
Invalid/blank votes	271	1.20	
Total votes	22,670	100.00	
Registered voters/turnout	36,427	62.23	
Source: ANGE

Batha Est
Party	Votes	%	Seats
Patriotic Salvation Movement	17,994	31.81	1
Al Wassat	8,463	14.96	1
RDR	6,739	11.91	0
People's Party for Change	6,395	11.30	0
National Union for Democracy and Renewal	5,866	10.37	0
Nida Al Watan	5,122	9.05	0
National Alliance for Democracy and Change	3,438	6.08	0
Reformist Party	2,557	4.52	0
Total	56,574	100.00	2
Valid votes	56,574	96.75	
Invalid/blank votes	1,902	3.25	
Total votes	58,476	100.00	
Registered voters/turnout	92,033	63.54	
Source: ANGE

Haraze
Party	Votes	%	Seats
Patriotic Salvation Movement	5,942	88.59	1
Reformist Party	390	5.81	0
UPPP	375	5.59	0
Total	6,707	100.00	1
Valid votes	6,707	95.13	
Invalid/blank votes	343	4.87	
Total votes	7,050	100.00	
Registered voters/turnout	11,465	61.49	
Source: ANGE

Assinet
Party	Votes	%	Seats
Patriotic Salvation Movement	13,276	84.88	1
Reformist Party	1,255	8.02	0
UFDD/F1	702	4.49	0
National Alliance for Democracy and Change	408	2.61	0
Total	15,641	100.00	1
Valid votes	15,641	95.76	
Invalid/blank votes	693	4.24	
Total votes	16,334	100.00	
Registered voters/turnout	24,865	65.69	
Source: ANGE

Ouadi-Rime
Party	Votes	%	Seats
Patriotic Salvation Movement	14,353	61.67	1
United Chad Party for Development	6,055	26.02	0
National Salvation Movement of Chad	2,383	10.24	0
Party for Democratic Renewal in Chad	483	2.08	0
Total	23,274	100.00	1
Valid votes	23,274	98.07	
Invalid/blank votes	457	1.93	
Total votes	23,731	100.00	
Registered voters/turnout	43,391	54.69	
Source: ANGE

Fitri
Party	Votes	%	Seats
Patriotic Salvation Movement	18,447	49.41	1
National Democratic and Social Convention	14,253	38.18	1
National Rally of Chadian Democrats	4,633	12.41	0
Total	37,333	100.00	2
Valid votes	37,333	96.82	
Invalid/blank votes	1,225	3.18	
Total votes	38,558	100.00	
Registered voters/turnout	71,797	53.70	
Source: ANGE

Batha Ouest
Party	Votes	%	Seats
Patriotic Salvation Movement	21,919	36.12	1
Union of Democratic and Republican Forces	19,254	31.73	1
Movement for Unity and Renewal	4,239	6.99	0
Al Wassat	3,621	5.97	0
Chadian Party for Renewal and Development	2,221	3.66	0
Party for Liberty and Development	2,201	3.63	0
Rally for Democracy and Progress	2,154	3.55	0
Union for the Refoundation of Chad	1,895	3.12	0
Alliance of Resistant Democrats	1,739	2.87	0
National Movement for Democracy and Alternation in Chad	1,443	2.38	0
Total	60,686	100.00	2
Valid votes	60,686	98.15	
Invalid/blank votes	1,147	1.85	
Total votes	61,833	100.00	
Registered voters/turnout	103,020	60.02	
Source: ANGE

Yigadroussa
Party	Votes	%	Seats
Patriotic Salvation Movement	611	57.00	1
African Democratic Party	461	43.00	0
Total	1,072	100.00	1
Valid votes	1,072	95.37	
Invalid/blank votes	52	4.63	
Total votes	1,124	100.00	
Registered voters/turnout	1,496	75.13	
Source: ANGE

Yarda
Party	Votes	%	Seats
Patriotic Salvation Movement	457	62.60	1
African Democratic Party	273	37.40	0
Total	730	100.00	1
Valid votes	730	84.79	
Invalid/blank votes	131	15.21	
Total votes	861	100.00	
Registered voters/turnout	1,163	74.03	
Source: ANGE

Borkou Onou
Party	Votes	%	Seats
Patriotic Salvation Movement	2,006	100.00	1
Total	2,006	100.00	1
Valid votes	2,006	95.71	
Invalid/blank votes	90	4.29	
Total votes	2,096	100.00	
Registered voters/turnout	2,615	80.15	
Source: ANGE

Kouba
Party	Votes	%	Seats
Patriotic Salvation Movement	2,231	30.37	1
Chadian People's Liberation Party	1,438	19.57	0
National Rally of Chadian Democrats	1,426	19.41	0
African Democratic Party	1,258	17.12	0
MJL	994	13.53	0
Total	7,347	100.00	1
Valid votes	7,347	97.52	
Invalid/blank votes	187	2.48	
Total votes	7,534	100.00	
Registered voters/turnout	10,662	70.66	
Source: ANGE

Borkou Yala
Party	Votes	%	Seats
Patriotic Salvation Movement	1,973	54.44	1
African Democratic Party	1,031	28.45	0
Union for the Refoundation of Chad	620	17.11	0
Total	3,624	100.00	1
Valid votes	3,624	91.70	
Invalid/blank votes	328	8.30	
Total votes	3,952	100.00	
Registered voters/turnout	5,025	78.65	
Source: ANGE

Borkou
Party	Votes	%	Seats
Patriotic Salvation Movement	8,876	64.19	1
African Democratic Party	2,316	16.75	0
Rally for Democracy and Progress	1,490	10.78	0
National Convergence for the Salvation of the People	1,146	8.29	0
Total	13,828	100.00	1
Valid votes	13,828	95.10	
Invalid/blank votes	713	4.90	
Total votes	14,541	100.00	
Registered voters/turnout	20,929	69.48	
Source: ANGE

Baguirmi
Party	Votes	%	Seats
Patriotic Salvation Movement	28,521	74.92	2
Chadian Democratic Union	9,546	25.08	0
Total	38,067	100.00	2
Valid votes	38,067	95.04	
Invalid/blank votes	1,985	4.96	
Total votes	40,052	100.00	
Registered voters/turnout	75,295	53.19	
Source: ANGE

Chari
Party	Votes	%	Seats
Patriotic Salvation Movement	23,632	36.53	1
Movement for Democracy and Socialism in Chad	12,480	19.29	1
Chadian Democratic Union	8,414	13.01	0
Party for Rally and Equity in Chad	6,169	9.54	0
National Movement for Change in Chad	2,246	3.47	0
United People	2,016	3.12	0
National Union for Democracy and Renewal	1,451	2.24	0
Action for Renewal of Chad	1,439	2.22	0
Democratic and Socialist Party for Alternation	1,390	2.15	0
AS	1,347	2.08	0
National Rally of Chadian Democrats	1,123	1.74	0
Party for the Development and Continuity of Chad	977	1.51	0
Al Wassat	728	1.13	0
Democratic Party of the Chadian People	510	0.79	0
Party for Democratic Renewal in Chad	421	0.65	0
People's Party for Change	188	0.29	0
Movement for Justice and Peace in Chad	165	0.26	0
Total	64,696	100.00	2
Valid votes	64,696	97.38	
Invalid/blank votes	1,741	2.62	
Total votes	66,437	100.00	
Registered voters/turnout	104,846	63.37	
Source: ANGE

Loug-Chari
Party	Votes	%	Seats
Patriotic Salvation Movement	19,754	34.39	1
Chadian Democratic Union	15,293	26.63	1
Chadian Socialist Action for Renewal	7,132	12.42	0
Party for Integral Democracy and Independence	5,464	9.51	0
Al Djamaa	3,953	6.88	0
Alliance for Democracy, Integrity and Freedom	3,444	6.00	0
Rally for Progress and Social Justice	2,395	4.17	0
Total	57,435	100.00	2
Valid votes	57,435	95.44	
Invalid/blank votes	2,744	4.56	
Total votes	60,179	100.00	
Registered voters/turnout	145,625	41.32	
Source: ANGE

Dourbali
Party	Votes	%	Seats
Patriotic Salvation Movement	19,235	43.95	1
National Movement for Change in Chad	12,228	27.94	1
Popular Action Framework for Solidarity and Unity of the Republic	1,902	4.35	0
Chadian Democratic Union	1,871	4.27	0
Ensemble pour la République	1,826	4.17	0
Party for Unity and Reconstruction	1,520	3.47	0
Union for the Refoundation of Chad	1,165	2.66	0
Movement for Unity and Renewal	978	2.23	0
Al Wassat	835	1.91	0
Popular Party for Justice and Equality	730	1.67	0
Party for the Development and Continuity of Chad	501	1.14	0
PCDD	403	0.92	0
Al Wihda	375	0.86	0
United Chad Party for Development	198	0.45	0
Total	43,767	100.00	2
Valid votes	43,767	94.55	
Invalid/blank votes	2,524	5.45	
Total votes	46,291	100.00	
Registered voters/turnout	108,851	42.53	
Source: ANGE

Zone Afrique
Party	Votes	%	Seats
Patriotic Salvation Movement	5,320	41.63	1
Reformist Party	3,545	27.74	0
Popular Front for the Federation	2,132	16.68	0
Union for the Refoundation of Chad	1,783	13.95	0
Total	12,780	100.00	1
Valid votes	12,780	98.13	
Invalid/blank votes	243	1.87	
Total votes	13,023	100.00	
Registered voters/turnout	24,615	52.91	
Source: ANGE

Zone Amerique
Party	Votes	%	Seats
Patriotic Salvation Movement	198	47.83	1
African Socialist Movement/Renewed	57	13.77	0
African Democratic Movement	56	13.53	0
Reformist Party	40	9.66	0
Party of Democrats for Renewal	34	8.21	0
Rally for Justice and the Environment	29	7.00	0
Total	414	100.00	1
Valid votes	414	96.28	
Invalid/blank votes	16	3.72	
Total votes	430	100.00	
Registered voters/turnout	732	58.74	
Source: ANGE

Zone Asie
Party	Votes	%	Seats
Patriotic Salvation Movement	623	42.15	1
National Rally of Chadian Democrats	386	26.12	0
Movement for Unity and Renewal	368	24.90	0
Rally for Democracy and Progress	101	6.83	0
Total	1,478	100.00	1
Valid votes	1,478	99.13	
Invalid/blank votes	13	0.87	
Total votes	1,491	100.00	
Registered voters/turnout	4,932	30.23	
Source: ANGE

Zone Europe
Party	Votes	%	Seats
Patriotic Salvation Movement	560	61.88	1
Movement for Unity and Renewal	119	13.15	0
Rally for Democracy and Progress	76	8.40	0
African Democratic Party	39	4.31	0
Citizens Party of Chad	26	2.87	0
National Union for Democracy and Renewal	24	2.65	0
African Democratic Movement	22	2.43	0
National Union	20	2.21	0
National Rally of Chadian Democrats	13	1.44	0
A New Day	6	0.66	0
Total	905	100.00	1
Valid votes	905	98.16	
Invalid/blank votes	17	1.84	
Total votes	922	100.00	
Registered voters/turnout	1,493	61.75	
Source: ANGE

Amdjarass
Party	Votes	%	Seats
Patriotic Salvation Movement	14,952	100.00	1
Total	14,952	100.00	1
Valid votes	14,952	95.75	
Invalid/blank votes	663	4.25	
Total votes	15,615	100.00	
Registered voters/turnout	24,023	65.00	
Source: ANGE

Wadi Hawar
Party	Votes	%	Seats
Patriotic Salvation Movement	16,675	100.00	1
Total	16,675	100.00	1
Valid votes	16,675	97.17	
Invalid/blank votes	486	2.83	
Total votes	17,161	100.00	
Registered voters/turnout	21,479	79.90	
Source: ANGE

Itou
Party	Votes	%	Seats
Patriotic Salvation Movement	5,648	100.00	1
Total	5,648	100.00	1
Valid votes	5,648	94.54	
Invalid/blank votes	326	5.46	
Total votes	5,974	100.00	
Registered voters/turnout	9,124	65.48	
Source: ANGE

Nohi
Party	Votes	%	Seats
Patriotic Salvation Movement	1,524	100.00	1
Total	1,524	100.00	1
Valid votes	1,524	83.60	
Invalid/blank votes	299	16.40	
Total votes	1,823	100.00	
Registered voters/turnout	2,792	65.29	
Source: ANGE

Bao
Party	Votes	%	Seats
Patriotic Salvation Movement	3,509	100.00	1
Total	3,509	100.00	1
Valid votes	3,509	99.49	
Invalid/blank votes	18	0.51	
Total votes	3,527	100.00	
Registered voters/turnout	5,443	64.80	
Source: ANGE

Mourdi
Party	Votes	%	Seats
Patriotic Salvation Movement	4,600	100.00	1
Total	4,600	100.00	1
Valid votes	4,600	94.90	
Invalid/blank votes	247	5.10	
Total votes	4,847	100.00	
Registered voters/turnout	6,002	80.76	
Source: ANGE

Fada
Party	Votes	%	Seats
Patriotic Salvation Movement	3,152	49.60	1
Movement for the Renewal of Chad	1,793	28.21	0
Party for Liberty and Development	1,410	22.19	0
Total	6,355	100.00	1
Valid votes	6,355	95.45	
Invalid/blank votes	303	4.55	
Total votes	6,658	100.00	
Registered voters/turnout	9,631	69.13	
Source: ANGE

Mourtcha
Party	Votes	%	Seats
Patriotic Salvation Movement	10,234	100.00	1
Total	10,234	100.00	1
Valid votes	10,234	96.65	
Invalid/blank votes	355	3.35	
Total votes	10,589	100.00	
Registered voters/turnout	13,602	77.85	
Source: ANGE

Lac Ounianga
Party	Votes	%	Seats
Patriotic Salvation Movement	3,125	100.00	1
Total	3,125	100.00	1
Valid votes	3,125	92.26	
Invalid/blank votes	262	7.74	
Total votes	3,387	100.00	
Registered voters/turnout	4,579	73.97	
Source: ANGE

Tebi
Party	Votes	%	Seats
Patriotic Salvation Movement	1,121	100.00	1
Total	1,121	100.00	1
Valid votes	1,121	76.21	
Invalid/blank votes	350	23.79	
Total votes	1,471	100.00	
Registered voters/turnout	1,872	78.58	
Source: ANGE

Gouro
Party	Votes	%	Seats
Patriotic Salvation Movement	4,774	100.00	1
Total	4,774	100.00	1
Valid votes	4,774	97.25	
Invalid/blank votes	135	2.75	
Total votes	4,909	100.00	
Registered voters/turnout	6,426	76.39	
Source: ANGE

Torbol
Party	Votes	%	Seats
Patriotic Salvation Movement	3,086	100.00	1
Total	3,086	100.00	1
Valid votes	3,086	91.79	
Invalid/blank votes	276	8.21	
Total votes	3,362	100.00	
Registered voters/turnout	4,274	78.66	
Source: ANGE

Guera
Party	Votes	%	Seats
Patriotic Salvation Movement	48,450	60.61	2
National Rally of Chadian Democrats	13,301	16.64	0
Democratic and Socialist Party for Alternation	9,702	12.14	0
AS	2,506	3.14	0
Chadian Union for Renaissance	1,380	1.73	0
CSDT	1,304	1.63	0
Movement for Unity and Renewal	1,055	1.32	0
Union of Forces for Change and Justice	921	1.15	0
Alliance of Resistant Democrats	751	0.94	0
Union for the Refoundation of Chad	566	0.71	0
Total	79,936	100.00	2
Valid votes	79,936	97.40	
Invalid/blank votes	2,134	2.60	
Total votes	82,070	100.00	
Registered voters/turnout	130,709	62.79	
Source: ANGE

Abtouyour
Party	Votes	%	Seats
Patriotic Salvation Movement	21,304	32.23	1
Democratic and Socialist Party for Alternation	12,359	18.70	1
National Rally of Chadian Democrats	10,610	16.05	0
AS	9,727	14.71	0
Chadian Convention for Peace and Development	6,393	9.67	0
Artisans of a New Chad	5,711	8.64	0
Total	66,104	100.00	2
Valid votes	66,104	96.65	
Invalid/blank votes	2,292	3.35	
Total votes	68,396	100.00	
Registered voters/turnout	133,006	51.42	
Source: ANGE

Barh Signaka
Party	Votes	%	Seats
Patriotic Salvation Movement	5,207	57.73	1
United People	1,835	20.35	0
National Rally of Chadian Democrats	1,710	18.96	0
Union for the Refoundation of Chad	267	2.96	0
Total	9,019	100.00	1
Valid votes	9,019	91.35	
Invalid/blank votes	854	8.65	
Total votes	9,873	100.00	
Registered voters/turnout	1,714	576.02	
Source: ANGE

Mangalme
Party	Votes	%	Seats
Patriotic Salvation Movement	18,639	39.68	1
National Rally of Chadian Democrats	13,646	29.05	1
National Rally for Development and Progress	6,937	14.77	0
PPST	2,870	6.11	0
Democratic and Socialist Party for Alternation	2,540	5.41	0
Al Wassat	2,342	4.99	0
Total	46,974	100.00	2
Valid votes	46,974	96.23	
Invalid/blank votes	1,842	3.77	
Total votes	48,816	100.00	
Registered voters/turnout	74,257	65.74	
Source: ANGE

Garada
Party	Votes	%	Seats
Patriotic Salvation Movement	8,324	42.91	1
United People	6,950	35.83	0
AS	2,828	14.58	0
Union for the Refoundation of Chad	1,296	6.68	0
Total	19,398	100.00	1
Valid votes	19,398	92.35	
Invalid/blank votes	1,608	7.65	
Total votes	21,006	100.00	
Registered voters/turnout	60,750	34.58	
Source: ANGE

Haraze-al-Biar
Party	Votes	%	Seats
Patriotic Salvation Movement	27,854	50.22	2
National Rally of Chadian Democrats	9,194	16.58	0
National Union for Democracy and Renewal	3,610	6.51	0
Party for Unity and Reconstruction	3,284	5.92	0
Popular Action Framework for Solidarity and Unity of the Republic	3,270	5.90	0
National Movement for Change in Chad	2,696	4.86	0
Radiodiffusion Nationale Tchadienne	2,549	4.60	0
Party for the Development and Continuity of Chad	1,633	2.94	0
Party of Democrats for Renewal	1,379	2.49	0
Total	55,469	100.00	2
Valid votes	55,469	96.43	
Invalid/blank votes	2,054	3.57	
Total votes	57,523	100.00	
Registered voters/turnout	126,190	45.58	
Source: ANGE

Dababa
Party	Votes	%	Seats
Patriotic Salvation Movement	23,366	45.19	1
Al Nassour	12,277	23.74	1
Party of Democrats for Renewal	6,894	13.33	0
Al Wassat	3,345	6.47	0
Alliance 43	3,015	5.83	0
Tawafouk	2,123	4.11	0
Union for the Refoundation of Chad	685	1.32	0
Total	51,705	100.00	2
Valid votes	51,705	96.04	
Invalid/blank votes	2,132	3.96	
Total votes	53,837	100.00	
Registered voters/turnout	99,400	54.16	
Source: ANGE

Dagana
Party	Votes	%	Seats
Rally for Democracy and Progress	31,652	40.66	1
Patriotic Salvation Movement	29,068	37.34	1
AFR	6,486	8.33	0
National Movement for Change in Chad	3,708	4.76	0
Al Wassat	2,709	3.48	0
National Alliance for Democracy and Change	2,584	3.32	0
Union for the Refoundation of Chad	1,643	2.11	0
Total	77,850	100.00	2
Valid votes	77,850	95.49	
Invalid/blank votes	3,678	4.51	
Total votes	81,528	100.00	
Registered voters/turnout	134,390	60.67	
Source: ANGE

Ngoura
Party	Votes	%	Seats
Patriotic Salvation Movement	13,636	49.07	1
Union for the Refoundation of Chad	3,536	12.72	0
Al Nassour	3,341	12.02	0
Party of Democrats for Renewal	3,311	11.92	0
National Rally of Chadian Democrats	2,133	7.68	0
Ensemble pour la République	1,831	6.59	0
Total	27,788	100.00	1
Valid votes	27,788	94.63	
Invalid/blank votes	1,576	5.37	
Total votes	29,364	100.00	
Registered voters/turnout	48,997	59.93	
Source: ANGE

Kanem Ouest
Party	Votes	%	Seats
Patriotic Salvation Movement	8,813	65.34	1
Rally for Democracy and Progress	4,675	34.66	0
Total	13,488	100.00	1
Valid votes	13,488	94.59	
Invalid/blank votes	771	5.41	
Total votes	14,259	100.00	
Registered voters/turnout	26,467	53.87	
Source: ANGE

Kanem Est
Party	Votes	%	Seats
Patriotic Salvation Movement	7,187	67.73	1
Rally for Democracy and Progress	3,424	32.27	0
Total	10,611	100.00	1
Valid votes	10,611	94.99	
Invalid/blank votes	560	5.01	
Total votes	11,171	100.00	
Registered voters/turnout	19,383	57.63	
Source: ANGE

Kanem Sud
Party	Votes	%	Seats
Rally for Democracy and Progress	10,307	55.19	1
Patriotic Salvation Movement	8,367	44.81	0
Total	18,674	100.00	1
Valid votes	18,674	92.32	
Invalid/blank votes	1,554	7.68	
Total votes	20,228	100.00	
Registered voters/turnout	58,625	34.50	
Source: ANGE

Kanem Nord
Party	Votes	%	Seats
Patriotic Salvation Movement	13,650	54.93	1
Rally for Democracy and Progress	10,456	42.08	0
Movement for Rally and Justice	742	2.99	0
Total	24,848	100.00	1
Valid votes	24,848	96.27	
Invalid/blank votes	963	3.73	
Total votes	25,811	100.00	
Registered voters/turnout	39,034	66.12	
Source: ANGE

Kanem Centre
Party	Votes	%	Seats
Patriotic Salvation Movement	19,498	36.92	1
Rally for Democracy and Progress	14,290	27.06	1
National Rally of Chadian Democrats	8,864	16.79	0
Al Wassat	4,694	8.89	0
Movement for Rally and Justice	3,379	6.40	0
African Democratic Movement	2,083	3.94	0
Total	52,808	100.00	2
Valid votes	52,808	95.14	
Invalid/blank votes	2,696	4.86	
Total votes	55,504	100.00	
Registered voters/turnout	88,543	62.69	
Source: ANGE

Zigueye
Party	Votes	%	Seats
Patriotic Salvation Movement	3,954	100.00	1
Total	3,954	100.00	1
Valid votes	3,954	98.31	
Invalid/blank votes	68	1.69	
Total votes	4,022	100.00	
Registered voters/turnout	7,225	55.67	
Source: ANGE

Mamdi
Party	Votes	%	Seats
Rally for Democracy and Progress	18,955	45.87	1
Patriotic Salvation Movement	17,808	43.09	0
National Union for Democracy and Renewal	3,641	8.81	0
Union for the Refoundation of Chad	919	2.22	0
Total	41,323	100.00	1
Valid votes	41,323	94.38	
Invalid/blank votes	2,461	5.62	
Total votes	43,784	100.00	
Registered voters/turnout	41,323	105.96	
Source: ANGE

Fouli
Party	Votes	%	Seats
Rally for Democracy and Progress	20,482	52.00	1
Patriotic Salvation Movement	18,909	48.00	0
Total	39,391	100.00	1
Valid votes	39,391	99.00	
Invalid/blank votes	398	1.00	
Total votes	39,789	100.00	
Registered voters/turnout	44,405	89.60	
Source: ANGE

Kaya
Party	Votes	%	Seats
Patriotic Salvation Movement	22,897	69.59	1
Rally for Democracy and Progress	5,789	17.60	0
Party for Unity and Democracy	4,215	12.81	0
Total	32,901	100.00	1
Valid votes	32,901	93.67	
Invalid/blank votes	2,224	6.33	
Total votes	35,125	100.00	
Registered voters/turnout	44,632	78.70	
Source: ANGE

Wayi
Party	Votes	%	Seats
Patriotic Salvation Movement	28,510	64.91	1
Rally for Democracy and Progress	12,042	27.42	0
National Union for Democracy and Renewal	3,371	7.67	0
Total	43,923	100.00	1
Valid votes	43,923	96.46	
Invalid/blank votes	1,614	3.54	
Total votes	45,537	100.00	
Registered voters/turnout	68,269	66.70	
Source: ANGE

Kouloukime
Party	Votes	%	Seats
Rally for Democracy and Progress	21,269	45.27	1
Patriotic Salvation Movement	19,814	42.17	0
Party for Democracy and Reconciliation in Chad	5,898	12.55	0
Total	46,981	100.00	1
Valid votes	46,981	96.01	
Invalid/blank votes	1,953	3.99	
Total votes	48,934	100.00	
Registered voters/turnout	67,009	73.03	
Source: ANGE

Lac Wey
Party	Votes	%	Seats
Patriotic Salvation Movement	29,217	24.94	1
National Action for Development	23,948	20.44	1
Chadian Convention for Peace and Development	23,317	19.90	1
Action for the Republic, Democracy and Development	16,785	14.33	1
Party for Integral Democracy and Independence	3,101	2.65	0
Rally for Democracy and Progress	2,833	2.42	0
Union for Renewal and Democracy	2,553	2.18	0
Patriotic Front for Democracy	2,304	1.97	0
Popular Action Framework for Solidarity and Unity of the Republic	1,873	1.60	0
Alliance Baobab	1,797	1.53	0
Party for Democratic Renewal in Chad	1,757	1.50	0
National Rally of Chadian Democrats	1,670	1.43	0
A New Day	1,650	1.41	0
National Union for Democracy and Renewal	1,641	1.40	0
Movement of Chadian Patriots for the Republic	1,453	1.24	0
Party for Reform and Economic Independence	1,264	1.08	0
Total	117,163	100.00	4
Valid votes	117,163	97.60	
Invalid/blank votes	2,878	2.40	
Total votes	120,041	100.00	
Registered voters/turnout	242,227	49.56	
Source: ANGE

Gueni
Party	Votes	%	Seats
Patriotic Salvation Movement	8,920	34.15	1
Party for Integral Democracy and Independence	5,827	22.31	0
Chadian Progressive Party	3,161	12.10	0
Le Republicain	2,742	10.50	0
Chadian Action for Unity and Socialism	2,120	8.12	0
Movement of Chadian Patriots for the Republic	1,845	7.06	0
Rally of the People of Chad	1,502	5.75	0
Total	26,117	100.00	1
Valid votes	26,117	93.54	
Invalid/blank votes	1,804	6.46	
Total votes	27,921	100.00	
Registered voters/turnout	62,794	44.46	
Source: ANGE

Ngourkosso
Party	Votes	%	Seats
Party for Integral Democracy and Independence	9,623	19.62	1
Movement of Chadian Patriots for the Republic	8,667	17.67	1
Patriotic Salvation Movement	5,298	10.80	0
National Rally of Chadian Democrats	4,930	10.05	0
Peace and Social Cohesion Party	2,519	5.14	0
Popular Action Framework for Solidarity and Unity of the Republic	2,391	4.87	0
Chadian Convention for Peace and Development	2,251	4.59	0
Union for the Refoundation of Chad	2,052	4.18	0
Les Elites	2,047	4.17	0
A New Day	1,953	3.98	0
National Convention for Peace and Development in Chad/Action	1,946	3.97	0
Rally of the People of Chad	1,673	3.41	0
People's Movement for Alternation	1,614	3.29	0
Action for the Republic, Democracy and Development	1,052	2.14	0
Citizens Party of Chad	1,035	2.11	0
Total	49,051	100.00	2
Valid votes	49,051	92.91	
Invalid/blank votes	3,745	7.09	
Total votes	52,796	100.00	
Registered voters/turnout	101,394	52.07	
Source: ANGE

Dodje
Party	Votes	%	Seats
Patriotic Salvation Movement	10,128	35.12	1
New Breath for the Republic	7,388	25.62	0
National Action for Development/Renovated	6,286	21.80	0
National Action for Development	5,037	17.47	0
Total	28,839	100.00	1
Valid votes	28,839	90.68	
Invalid/blank votes	2,965	9.32	
Total votes	31,804	100.00	
Registered voters/turnout	68,650	46.33	
Source: ANGE

La Pende
Party	Votes	%	Seats
Patriotic Salvation Movement	9,413	33.82	1
Dynamic Republican Alliance	5,850	21.02	1
National Rally of Chadian Democrats	2,939	10.56	0
Rally for Progress and Social Justice	2,118	7.61	0
A New Day	1,486	5.34	0
Chadian Convention for Peace and Development	1,017	3.65	0
Peace and Social Cohesion Party	1,011	3.63	0
Movement of Chadian Patriots for the Republic	991	3.56	0
AFD	914	3.28	0
Union for Renewal and Democracy	641	2.30	0
Les Elites	490	1.76	0
Communist Party of Work to the People of Chad	385	1.38	0
Union for the Refoundation of Chad	314	1.13	0
Federation, Action for the Republic	262	0.94	0
Total	27,831	100.00	2
Valid votes	27,831	92.68	
Invalid/blank votes	2,198	7.32	
Total votes	30,029	100.00	
Registered voters/turnout	99,549	30.17	
Source: ANGE

La Nya
Party	Votes	%	Seats
Patriotic Salvation Movement	8,072	41.49	1
National Rally of Chadian Democrats	5,045	25.93	1
Federation, Action for the Republic	2,598	13.36	0
Rally of Nationalists for Democracy and Development	1,418	7.29	0
Convention for Democracy and Federalism	1,284	6.60	0
Rally for Progress and Social Justice	1,036	5.33	0
Total	19,453	100.00	2
Valid votes	19,453	90.04	
Invalid/blank votes	2,153	9.96	
Total votes	21,606	100.00	
Registered voters/turnout	94,347	22.90	
Source: ANGE

La Nya Pende
Party	Votes	%	Seats
Patriotic Salvation Movement	7,865	31.11	1
Union for Renewal and Democracy	4,394	17.38	1
Action for Renewal of Chad	3,518	13.92	0
Les Elites	2,896	11.46	0
Movement for the National Reconstruction of Chad	2,712	10.73	0
Party for Unity and Democracy	2,241	8.87	0
Peace and Social Cohesion Party	1,652	6.54	0
Total	25,278	100.00	2
Valid votes	25,278	91.09	
Invalid/blank votes	2,474	8.91	
Total votes	27,752	100.00	
Registered voters/turnout	77,584	35.77	
Source: ANGE

Kouh Est
Party	Votes	%	Seats
Patriotic Salvation Movement	7,566	32.76	1
National Rally of Chadian Democrats	3,338	14.45	0
AFD	3,244	14.05	0
Popular Front for the Federation	2,875	12.45	0
Movement of Chadian Patriots for the Republic	2,335	10.11	0
Chadian Convention for Peace and Development	2,292	9.93	0
People's Party for the Strengthening of Democracy	1,443	6.25	0
Total	23,093	100.00	1
Valid votes	23,093	88.99	
Invalid/blank votes	2,857	11.01	
Total votes	25,950	100.00	
Registered voters/turnout	67,031	38.71	
Source: ANGE

Monts de Lam
Party	Votes	%	Seats
Patriotic Salvation Movement	22,680	41.71	2
National Union for Democracy and Renewal	9,327	17.15	1
Rally for Progress and Social Justice	4,129	7.59	0
Union for Renewal and Democracy	4,030	7.41	0
Chadian Convention for Peace and Development	3,611	6.64	0
National Rally of Chadian Democrats	3,552	6.53	0
Emergence for the Development of Chad	2,633	4.84	0
Party for Liberty and Development	2,217	4.08	0
Union of Progressive Workers for Cohesion	2,194	4.04	0
Total	54,373	100.00	3
Valid votes	54,373	92.45	
Invalid/blank votes	4,440	7.55	
Total votes	58,813	100.00	
Registered voters/turnout	149,470	39.35	
Source: ANGE

Kouh Ouest
Party	Votes	%	Seats
National Union for Democracy and Renewal	3,268	23.38	1
Patriotic Salvation Movement	3,036	21.72	0
AFD	1,615	11.56	0
Action for the Republic, Democracy and Development	1,408	10.07	0
National Rally of Chadian Democrats	1,322	9.46	0
Federation, Action for the Republic	1,298	9.29	0
Rally for Democracy and Progress	1,066	7.63	0
People's Party for the Strengthening of Democracy	963	6.89	0
Total	13,976	100.00	1
Valid votes	13,976	89.12	
Invalid/blank votes	1,706	10.88	
Total votes	15,682	100.00	
Registered voters/turnout	35,879	43.71	
Source: ANGE

Mayo-Boneye
Party	Votes	%	Seats
Patriotic Salvation Movement	14,300	24.36	1
National Union for Democracy and Renewal	11,755	20.03	1
Democratic Party of the Chadian People	8,619	14.69	1
National Rally of Chadian Democrats	4,167	7.10	0
Party for Rally and Equity in Chad	3,810	6.49	0
National Rally for Development and Progress	3,268	5.57	0
RARE	2,139	3.64	0
Movement for Equality and Citizens' Rally	2,020	3.44	0
A New Day	1,839	3.13	0
Party of Democrats and Socialists	1,637	2.79	0
Peace and Social Cohesion Party	1,599	2.72	0
Les Elites	1,415	2.41	0
CNAD	1,182	2.01	0
Reformist Party	941	1.60	0
Total	58,691	100.00	3
Valid votes	58,691	91.34	
Invalid/blank votes	5,566	8.66	
Total votes	64,257	100.00	
Registered voters/turnout	157,088	40.91	
Source: ANGE

Mayo-Lemie
Party	Votes	%	Seats
National Rally of Chadian Democrats	4,350	29.05	1
Patriotic Salvation Movement	3,577	23.89	0
National Union for Democracy and Renewal	2,569	17.16	0
Rally for Democracy and Progress	2,315	15.46	0
Al Nassour	1,550	10.35	0
CNAD	612	4.09	0
Total	14,973	100.00	1
Valid votes	14,973	79.67	
Invalid/blank votes	3,820	20.33	
Total votes	18,793	100.00	
Registered voters/turnout	61,157	30.73	
Source: ANGE

Mont-Illi
Party	Votes	%	Seats
Patriotic Salvation Movement	20,978	30.69	1
National Rally of Chadian Democrats	18,802	27.51	1
National Union for Democracy and Renewal	16,072	23.51	1
Les Elites	3,171	4.64	0
Union for the Refoundation of Chad	2,298	3.36	0
Democratic Party of the Chadian People	1,666	2.44	0
National Rally for Development and Progress	1,634	2.39	0
Peace and Social Cohesion Party	1,074	1.57	0
AS	1,055	1.54	0
Social Democratic Party	898	1.31	0
RARE	702	1.03	0
Total	68,350	100.00	3
Valid votes	68,350	93.47	
Invalid/blank votes	4,772	6.53	
Total votes	73,122	100.00	
Registered voters/turnout	157,619	46.39	
Source: ANGE

Kabbia
Party	Votes	%	Seats
Patriotic Salvation Movement	22,814	48.53	2
National Rally of Chadian Democrats	4,701	10.00	1
National Rally for Development and Progress	4,103	8.73	0
National Union for Democracy and Renewal	3,927	8.35	0
Movement for Unity and Renewal	3,390	7.21	0
Chadian Convention for Peace and Development	3,063	6.52	0
Party of Democrats and Socialists	2,012	4.28	0
Popular Movement for Reform	1,984	4.22	0
Al Wassat	1,014	2.16	0
Total	47,008	100.00	3
Valid votes	47,008	89.15	
Invalid/blank votes	5,724	10.85	
Total votes	52,732	100.00	
Registered voters/turnout	147,560	35.74	
Source: ANGE

Mayo-Dallah
Party	Votes	%	Seats
National Rally of Chadian Democrats	13,173	31.90	1
Patriotic Salvation Movement	11,368	27.53	1
Union of Democrats for Development	5,202	12.60	0
MPD	3,440	8.33	0
National Union for Democracy and Renewal	2,146	5.20	0
Rally for Democracy and Progress	2,081	5.04	0
Party for Liberty and Development	2,057	4.98	0
Les Elites	991	2.40	0
Alliance of the Forces of Progress	836	2.02	0
Total	41,294	100.00	2
Valid votes	41,294	87.56	
Invalid/blank votes	5,869	12.44	
Total votes	47,163	100.00	
Registered voters/turnout	158,424	29.77	
Source: ANGE

Mayo-Binder
Party	Votes	%	Seats
Patriotic Salvation Movement	5,627	36.12	1
Party for Rally and Equity in Chad	4,935	31.68	0
National Union for Democracy and Renewal	2,533	16.26	0
National Rally of Chadian Democrats	1,318	8.46	0
Party for Liberty and Development	1,167	7.49	0
Total	15,580	100.00	1
Valid votes	15,580	82.32	
Invalid/blank votes	3,346	17.68	
Total votes	18,926	100.00	
Registered voters/turnout	43,820	43.19	
Source: ANGE

Lac-Léré
Party	Votes	%	Seats
Patriotic Salvation Movement	6,825	33.34	1
Party for Rally and Equity in Chad	5,550	27.11	1
National Rally of Chadian Democrats	3,479	16.99	0
National Union for Democracy and Renewal	2,399	11.72	0
Party for Liberty and Development	2,219	10.84	0
Total	20,472	100.00	2
Valid votes	20,472	92.72	
Invalid/blank votes	1,607	7.28	
Total votes	22,079	100.00	
Registered voters/turnout	77,465	28.50	
Source: ANGE

El-Ouaya
Party	Votes	%	Seats
Patriotic Salvation Movement	5,499	30.65	1
National Union for Democracy and Renewal	4,923	27.44	0
National Rally of Chadian Democrats	2,838	15.82	0
Party for Liberty and Development	2,241	12.49	0
Party for Rally and Equity in Chad	1,226	6.83	0
Union of Democrats for Development	953	5.31	0
Movement of Upright and Democratic Citizens	264	1.47	0
Total	17,944	100.00	1
Valid votes	17,944	93.15	
Invalid/blank votes	1,319	6.85	
Total votes	19,263	100.00	
Registered voters/turnout	37,328	51.60	
Source: ANGE

Nanaye
Party	Votes	%	Seats
Patriotic Salvation Movement	6,345	28.99	1
National Rally of Chadian Democrats	4,673	21.35	0
National Union for Democracy and Renewal	4,364	19.94	0
Chadian Convention for Peace and Development	2,810	12.84	0
Convergence for Social Democracy	1,873	8.56	0
Rally for the Republic – Lingui	1,820	8.32	0
Total	21,885	100.00	1
Valid votes	21,885	93.29	
Invalid/blank votes	1,575	6.71	
Total votes	23,460	100.00	
Registered voters/turnout	62,253	37.68	
Source: ANGE

Mandoul Oriental
Party	Votes	%	Seats
Popular Action Framework for Solidarity and Unity of the Republic	4,784	29.42	1
National Rally of Chadian Democrats	4,068	25.02	1
Patriotic Salvation Movement	3,168	19.48	0
Rally for Democracy and Progress	771	4.74	0
Union for Renewal and Democracy	754	4.64	0
Movement for Democracy and Socialism in Chad	718	4.42	0
Peace and Social Cohesion Party	599	3.68	0
Union for the Refoundation of Chad	480	2.95	0
Movement for Freedom, Peace and Renewal in Chad	476	2.93	0
Convention for Democracy and Federalism	287	1.77	0
Convergence for Social Democracy	154	0.95	0
Total	16,259	100.00	2
Valid votes	16,259	88.64	
Invalid/blank votes	2,083	11.36	
Total votes	18,342	100.00	
Registered voters/turnout	85,298	21.50	
Source: ANGE

Barh Sara
Party	Votes	%	Seats
Patriotic Salvation Movement	11,955	38.27	1
Peace and Social Cohesion Party	5,147	16.48	1
Union for Renewal and Democracy	2,699	8.64	0
Popular Action Framework for Solidarity and Unity of the Republic	1,705	5.46	0
National Rally of Chadian Democrats	1,623	5.20	0
Al Wassat	1,462	4.68	0
Socialist Alliance for Integral Renewal	1,441	4.61	0
Party for Democracy and Social Justice	1,300	4.16	0
Chadian Socialist Action for Renewal	1,259	4.03	0
Convention for Democracy and Federalism	859	2.75	0
Union for the Democratic Republic of Chad	803	2.57	0
National Union for Democracy and Renewal	677	2.17	0
Socialist Party of Chad	306	0.98	0
Total	31,236	100.00	2
Valid votes	31,236	91.42	
Invalid/blank votes	2,931	8.58	
Total votes	34,167	100.00	
Registered voters/turnout	96,037	35.58	
Source: ANGE

Mandoul Occidental
Party	Votes	%	Seats
National Union for Democracy and Renewal	5,128	30.15	1
Patriotic Salvation Movement	3,823	22.48	0
National Rally of Chadian Democrats	3,428	20.15	0
National Rally for Development and Progress	1,353	7.95	0
Popular Action Framework for Solidarity and Unity of the Republic	1,256	7.38	0
A New Day	768	4.52	0
Dynamic Republican Alliance	447	2.63	0
PPDST	419	2.46	0
Les Elites	387	2.28	0
Total	17,009	100.00	1
Valid votes	17,009	85.15	
Invalid/blank votes	2,966	14.85	
Total votes	19,975	100.00	
Registered voters/turnout	64,299	31.07	
Source: ANGE

Goundi
Party	Votes	%	Seats
Patriotic Salvation Movement	11,300	79.23	1
National Rally of Chadian Democrats	1,203	8.43	0
Popular Front for the Federation	1,181	8.28	0
Union for the Refoundation of Chad	579	4.06	0
Total	14,263	100.00	1
Valid votes	14,263	90.38	
Invalid/blank votes	1,518	9.62	
Total votes	15,781	100.00	
Registered voters/turnout	42,003	37.57	
Source: ANGE

Taralnass
Party	Votes	%	Seats
Patriotic Salvation Movement	2,412	38.66	1
Party for Rally and Equity in Chad	1,935	31.01	0
Popular Action Framework for Solidarity and Unity of the Republic	1,143	18.32	0
Party for Liberty and Development	749	12.01	0
Total	6,239	100.00	1
Valid votes	6,239	86.27	
Invalid/blank votes	993	13.73	
Total votes	7,232	100.00	
Registered voters/turnout	28,698	25.20	
Source: ANGE

Mandoul Central
Party	Votes	%	Seats
Chadian Alliance for Development	2,571	26.86	1
Patriotic Salvation Movement	2,350	24.55	0
Popular Action Framework for Solidarity and Unity of the Republic	1,985	20.74	0
National Rally of Chadian Democrats	1,674	17.49	0
Les Elites	992	10.36	0
Total	9,572	100.00	1
Valid votes	9,572	87.85	
Invalid/blank votes	1,324	12.15	
Total votes	10,896	100.00	
Registered voters/turnout	28,623	38.07	
Source: ANGE

Barh-Kôh
Party	Votes	%	Seats
Patriotic Salvation Movement	13,211	32.79	1
National Union for Democracy and Renewal	9,788	24.29	1
Union for Renewal and Democracy	8,975	22.27	1
National Rally of Chadian Democrats	1,209	3.00	0
Rally for Democracy and Progress	1,165	2.89	0
Peace and Social Cohesion Party	1,057	2.62	0
Union for the Refoundation of Chad	1,054	2.62	0
Rally of People for Democratic Alternation	872	2.16	0
Convention for Democracy and Federalism	831	2.06	0
Movement of Chadian Patriots for the Republic	766	1.90	0
Convergence for Social Democracy	696	1.73	0
Federation, Action for the Republic	671	1.67	0
Total	40,295	100.00	3
Valid votes	40,295	92.17	
Invalid/blank votes	3,424	7.83	
Total votes	43,719	100.00	
Registered voters/turnout	148,897	29.36	
Source: ANGE

Grande Sido
Party	Votes	%	Seats
Patriotic Salvation Movement	11,655	33.58	1
National Rally of Chadian Democrats	9,434	27.18	1
A Nation for All	7,735	22.28	0
Artisans of a New Chad	2,265	6.52	0
Union for Renewal and Democracy	2,028	5.84	0
Convergence for Social Democracy	1,596	4.60	0
Total	34,713	100.00	2
Valid votes	34,713	92.81	
Invalid/blank votes	2,690	7.19	
Total votes	37,403	100.00	
Registered voters/turnout	75,581	49.49	
Source: ANGE

Lac Iro
Party	Votes	%	Seats
Patriotic Salvation Movement	19,307	43.27	1
Union of Democratic Forces	15,416	34.55	1
Les Elites	3,608	8.09	0
Union for Renewal and Democracy	2,893	6.48	0
Peace and Social Cohesion Party	1,722	3.86	0
People's Alliance for the Republic/Trompette	1,677	3.76	0
Total	44,623	100.00	2
Valid votes	44,623	91.33	
Invalid/blank votes	4,234	8.67	
Total votes	48,857	100.00	
Registered voters/turnout	112,969	43.25	
Source: ANGE

La Moula
Party	Votes	%	Seats
Socialist Party of Chad	4,383	28.40	1
Patriotic Salvation Movement	2,993	19.39	0
Union for Democracy, Development and Justice in Chad	2,406	15.59	0
National Rally of Chadian Democrats	1,725	11.18	0
Chadian Socialist Action for Renewal	1,653	10.71	0
Convergence for Social Democracy	1,179	7.64	0
Peace and Social Cohesion Party	920	5.96	0
ASR	175	1.13	0
Total	15,434	100.00	1
Valid votes	15,434	91.69	
Invalid/blank votes	1,398	8.31	
Total votes	16,832	100.00	
Registered voters/turnout	27,241	61.79	
Source: ANGE

Bragoto
Party	Votes	%	Seats
A New Day	5,963	60.17	1
Union for Renewal and Democracy	2,025	20.43	0
Patriotic Salvation Movement	1,923	19.40	0
Total	9,911	100.00	1
Valid votes	9,911	88.52	
Invalid/blank votes	1,285	11.48	
Total votes	11,196	100.00	
Registered voters/turnout	34,170	32.77	
Source: ANGE

Korbol
Party	Votes	%	Seats
Les Leaders	1,467	44.45	1
Patriotic Salvation Movement	1,053	31.91	0
National Demobilization and Reintegration Program	377	11.42	0
Union for Renewal and Democracy	201	6.09	0
National Rally of Chadian Democrats	153	4.64	0
Chadian Convention for Peace and Development	49	1.48	0
Total	3,300	100.00	1
Valid votes	3,300	80.19	
Invalid/blank votes	815	19.81	
Total votes	4,115	100.00	
Registered voters/turnout	17,007	24.20	
Source: ANGE

N'Djamena 1er
Party	Votes	%	Seats
Patriotic Salvation Movement	21,652	62.64	2
National Rally of Chadian Democrats	3,455	10.00	0
Rally for Democracy and Progress	2,370	6.86	0
Peace and Social Cohesion Party	2,175	6.29	0
Movement for Democracy and Socialism in Chad	1,499	4.34	0
Al Wassat	1,381	4.00	0
Youth Movement for Economic and Social Recovery	1,076	3.11	0
Union for the Refoundation of Chad	956	2.77	0
Total	34,564	100.00	2
Valid votes	34,564	95.36	
Invalid/blank votes	1,683	4.64	
Total votes	36,247	100.00	
Registered voters/turnout	10,864	333.64	
Source: ANGE

N'Djamena 2ème
Party	Votes	%	Seats
Patriotic Salvation Movement	8,228	21.95	1
Peace and Social Cohesion Party	5,317	14.19	1
Al Wassat	4,948	13.20	0
Movement for Unity and Renewal	4,752	12.68	0
Movement for Democracy and Socialism in Chad	3,433	9.16	0
Party for Unity and Reconstruction	2,547	6.80	0
Party for National Unity, Democracy, Dialogue and Development of Chad	2,470	6.59	0
Union for the Refoundation of Chad	2,351	6.27	0
MCC	1,830	4.88	0
Party for Democratic Renewal in Chad	1,603	4.28	0
Total	37,479	100.00	2
Valid votes	37,479	95.59	
Invalid/blank votes	1,731	4.41	
Total votes	39,210	100.00	
Registered voters/turnout	75,555	51.90	
Source: ANGE

N'Djamena 3ème
Party	Votes	%	Seats
Patriotic Salvation Movement	15,792	41.99	1
Rally for Democracy and Progress	5,394	14.34	0
Al Wassat	4,834	12.85	0
Alliance 43	3,442	9.15	0
Rally for the Republic – Lingui	2,934	7.80	0
Les Serviteurs	2,473	6.58	0
Convention for Democracy and Federalism	1,597	4.25	0
National Convergence for the Salvation of the People	1,145	3.04	0
Total	37,611	100.00	1
Valid votes	37,611	95.35	
Invalid/blank votes	1,835	4.65	
Total votes	39,446	100.00	
Registered voters/turnout	68,475	57.61	
Source: ANGE

N'Djamena 4ème
Party	Votes	%	Seats
Patriotic Salvation Movement	15,276	26.26	1
Rally for Democracy and Progress	13,084	22.49	1
National Union for Democracy and Renewal	7,893	13.57	0
Al Wassat	6,240	10.72	0
National People's Convention	5,456	9.38	0
Popular Front for the Liberation of the South	4,716	8.11	0
Union for Renewal and Democracy	2,995	5.15	0
People's Party for Freedom	2,522	4.33	0
Total	58,182	100.00	2
Valid votes	58,182	97.16	
Invalid/blank votes	1,703	2.84	
Total votes	59,885	100.00	
Registered voters/turnout	87,532	68.41	
Source: ANGE

N'Djamena 5ème
Party	Votes	%	Seats
Patriotic Salvation Movement	26,963	33.65	1
Movement for Unity and Renewal	22,689	28.31	1
Al Wassat	8,227	10.27	0
National Democratic and Social Convention/Al Nassour	7,663	9.56	0
Gathering of the United Sons of Chad for Development	5,839	7.29	0
RA (Rally for Democracy and Progress/Action for Renewal of Chad)	3,556	4.44	0
Al Takhadoum	2,643	3.30	0
Liberal Party for the Emancipation and Progress of Chad	2,557	3.19	0
Total	80,137	100.00	2
Valid votes	80,137	97.88	
Invalid/blank votes	1,736	2.12	
Total votes	81,873	100.00	
Registered voters/turnout	116,499	70.28	
Source: ANGE

N'Djamena 6ème
Party	Votes	%	Seats
Movement of Chadian Patriots for the Republic	11,334	27.14	1
Patriotic Salvation Movement	8,768	20.99	0
National Union for Democracy and Renewal	7,257	17.37	0
Al Wassat	3,176	7.60	0
Party for Integral Democracy and Independence	2,164	5.18	0
New Vision	1,824	4.37	0
RDDP	1,738	4.16	0
Union for the Refoundation of Chad	1,708	4.09	0
Les Leaders	1,319	3.16	0
Federation, Action for the Republic	1,286	3.08	0
Liberal Party for the Emancipation and Progress of Chad	1,193	2.86	0
Total	41,767	100.00	1
Valid votes	41,767	96.53	
Invalid/blank votes	1,502	3.47	
Total votes	43,269	100.00	
Registered voters/turnout	54,477	79.43	
Source: ANGE

N'Djamena 7ème
Party	Votes	%	Seats
Patriotic Salvation Movement	12,751	14.40	1
National Rally of Chadian Democrats	11,427	12.91	1
Popular Front for Liberation	10,310	11.65	1
La Nouvelle Génération	8,032	9.07	0
National Union for Democracy and Renewal	7,123	8.05	0
New Breath for the Republic	3,185	3.60	0
Chadian Democratic Union	3,033	3.43	0
Al Wihda	2,871	3.24	0
Al Nassour	2,737	3.09	0
CAP SUR/Rally for the Republic – Lingui	2,633	2.97	0
Action for the Republic, Democracy and Development	2,583	2.92	0
Gathering of the United Sons of Chad for Development	2,569	2.90	0
Peace and Social Cohesion Party	2,351	2.66	0
Al Wassat	2,322	2.62	0
Federation, Action for the Republic Bis	1,853	2.09	0
Union for Renewal and Democracy	1,664	1.88	0
Party for Democratic Development and Freedoms	1,661	1.88	0
Peace and Social Cohesion Party	1,546	1.75	0
Dynamic Republican Alliance	1,501	1.70	0
Federation, Action for the Republic	1,443	1.63	0
Party of Chadian Socialist Intellectuals for Evolution	1,360	1.54	0
The Reformers	1,278	1.44	0
Union for the Refoundation of Chad	1,190	1.34	0
Party for Integral Democracy and Independence	1,102	1.24	0
Total	88,525	100.00	3
Valid votes	88,525	97.79	
Invalid/blank votes	2,005	2.21	
Total votes	90,530	100.00	
Registered voters/turnout	207,748	43.58	
Source: ANGE

N'Djamena 8ème
Party	Votes	%	Seats
Patriotic Salvation Movement	52,844	50.85	3
Rally for Democracy and Progress	4,752	4.57	0
National Democratic and Social Convention/Al Nassour	3,668	3.53	0
Movement for Democracy and Socialism in Chad	3,650	3.51	0
Movement for Unity and Renewal	3,603	3.47	0
National Rally of Chadian Democrats	3,594	3.46	0
Al Wassat	2,712	2.61	0
Al Takhadoum	2,637	2.54	0
Union for the Refoundation of Chad	2,353	2.26	0
National Rally for Development and Progress	2,341	2.25	0
Alliance 43	2,006	1.93	0
Horizon Movement for Democracy	1,710	1.65	0
Ensemble pour la République	1,660	1.60	0
People's Movement for Justice and Equality	1,625	1.56	0
Dynamic Republican Alliance	1,605	1.54	0
People's Party for the Strengthening of Democracy	1,593	1.53	0
Reformist Party	1,591	1.53	0
People's Party for Democratic Change	1,584	1.52	0
Generation Consciente	1,557	1.50	0
Peace and Social Cohesion Party	1,549	1.49	0
Les Refondeurs	1,529	1.47	0
Party of Democrats for Renewal	1,483	1.43	0
RDT/C	1,324	1.27	0
Party for National Unity, Dialogue and Democracy	945	0.91	0
Total	103,915	100.00	3
Valid votes	103,915	98.03	
Invalid/blank votes	2,090	1.97	
Total votes	106,005	100.00	
Registered voters/turnout	193,382	54.82	
Source: ANGE

N'Djamena 9ème
Party	Votes	%	Seats
Peace and Social Cohesion Party	6,451	18.40	1
Patriotic Salvation Movement	5,770	16.46	0
National Rally of Chadian Democrats	2,804	8.00	0
Ensemble pour le 9ème	2,322	6.62	0
Movement for Democracy and Socialism in Chad	2,210	6.30	0
National Union for Democracy and Renewal	2,138	6.10	0
Al Wassat	2,014	5.74	0
Revolutionary Movement for Democracy and Peace	1,711	4.88	0
Les Leaders	1,670	4.76	0
Party for Liberty and Development	1,609	4.59	0
Convention for Democracy and Federalism	1,357	3.87	0
Democratic Party of the Chadian People	1,315	3.75	0
National Rally for Development and Progress	1,272	3.63	0
National Movement for Reconstruction/Democratic Rally	1,215	3.47	0
National Demobilization and Reintegration Program	1,205	3.44	0
Total	35,063	100.00	1
Valid votes	35,063	96.78	
Invalid/blank votes	1,166	3.22	
Total votes	36,229	100.00	
Registered voters/turnout	83,886	43.19	
Source: ANGE

N'Djamena 10ème
Party	Votes	%	Seats
Patriotic Salvation Movement	5,951	15.51	1
Rally for Democracy and Progress	4,725	12.32	0
Al Wassat	3,372	8.79	0
Party for Liberty and Development	3,250	8.47	0
Movement for Unity and Renewal	2,532	6.60	0
National Union for Democracy and Renewal	2,530	6.60	0
Al Wihda	2,325	6.06	0
Peace and Social Cohesion Party	2,259	5.89	0
nouvelle generation pol	2,177	5.67	0
African Democratic Party	1,591	4.15	0
People's Movement for Democracy in Chad	1,510	3.94	0
Youth Movement for Economic and Social Recovery	1,415	3.69	0
Chadian Democratic Union	1,400	3.65	0
People's Alliance for the Republic	1,389	3.62	0
Rally for Democracy and Progress/Renewed	1,060	2.76	0
People's Party for Democratic Change	876	2.28	0
Total	38,362	100.00	1
Valid votes	38,362	96.71	
Invalid/blank votes	1,305	3.29	
Total votes	39,667	100.00	
Registered voters/turnout	79,327	50.00	
Source: ANGE

Ouara
Party	Votes	%	Seats
Patriotic Salvation Movement	60,751	47.77	3
Party for Liberty and Development	23,906	18.80	1
Reformist Party	22,242	17.49	1
Movement for Unity and Renewal	6,714	5.28	0
Union for the Refoundation of Chad	6,139	4.83	0
UNDR/Chadian Social Democrats Front	3,150	2.48	0
National Rally of Chadian Democrats	2,627	2.07	0
Union of Resistance Forces	1,640	1.29	0
Total	127,169	100.00	5
Valid votes	127,169	96.75	
Invalid/blank votes	4,267	3.25	
Total votes	131,436	100.00	
Registered voters/turnout	277,302	47.40	
Source: ANGE

Abougoudam
Party	Votes	%	Seats
Patriotic Salvation Movement	8,454	37.33	1
Reformist Party	4,424	19.53	0
Ensemble pour la République	3,920	17.31	0
UPPP/FORT	3,432	15.15	0
Attayar Al-Islahi	2,417	10.67	0
Total	22,647	100.00	1
Valid votes	22,647	96.65	
Invalid/blank votes	784	3.35	
Total votes	23,431	100.00	
Registered voters/turnout	39,246	59.70	
Source: ANGE

Djourouf-al-Amar
Party	Votes	%	Seats
Patriotic Salvation Movement	15,673	51.64	1
Horizon Movement for Democracy	8,887	29.28	0
Ensemble pour la République	5,791	19.08	0
Total	30,351	100.00	1
Valid votes	30,351	95.78	
Invalid/blank votes	1,337	4.22	
Total votes	31,688	100.00	
Registered voters/turnout	63,231	50.11	
Source: ANGE

Assoungha
Party	Votes	%	Seats
Patriotic Salvation Movement	77,734	46.96	2
Party for Liberty and Development/Reformist Party	38,814	23.45	1
National Rally of Chadian Democrats	36,676	22.16	1
Chadian National Social Democratic Congress	12,293	7.43	0
Total	165,517	100.00	4
Valid votes	165,517	98.83	
Invalid/blank votes	1,954	1.17	
Total votes	167,471	100.00	
Registered voters/turnout	199,996	83.74	
Source: ANGE

Barh-Azoum
Party	Votes	%	Seats
Patriotic Salvation Movement	30,708	50.71	2
National Union for Democracy and Renewal	8,786	14.51	0
United Chad Party for Development	6,328	10.45	0
UPPP	6,003	9.91	0
National Rally of Chadian Democrats	4,560	7.53	0
Al Wassat	2,222	3.67	0
Union for Peace and Democracy	1,954	3.23	0
Total	60,561	100.00	2
Valid votes	60,561	97.49	
Invalid/blank votes	1,559	2.51	
Total votes	62,120	100.00	
Registered voters/turnout	131,197	47.35	
Source: ANGE

Adoudeia
Party	Votes	%	Seats
Patriotic Salvation Movement	10,740	36.65	1
National Rally of Chadian Democrats	7,336	25.04	0
Al Wassat	6,214	21.21	0
Movement for the Renewal of Chad	5,012	17.10	0
Total	29,302	100.00	1
Valid votes	29,302	96.44	
Invalid/blank votes	1,082	3.56	
Total votes	30,384	100.00	
Registered voters/turnout	43,017	70.63	
Source: ANGE

Haraze-Mangueigne
Party	Votes	%	Seats
Patriotic Salvation Movement	11,287	40.70	1
National Union for Democracy and Renewal	6,184	22.30	0
March for the Reestablishment of Harmony	4,395	15.85	0
Rally for Democracy and Progress	3,173	11.44	0
Union for the Refoundation of Chad	2,695	9.72	0
Total	27,734	100.00	1
Valid votes	27,734	97.41	
Invalid/blank votes	738	2.59	
Total votes	28,472	100.00	
Registered voters/turnout	41,760	68.18	
Source: ANGE

Kimiti
Party	Votes	%	Seats
Patriotic Salvation Movement	23,861	61.22	2
National Rally of Chadian Democrats	8,409	21.58	0
Reformist Party	6,704	17.20	0
Total	38,974	100.00	2
Valid votes	38,974	92.78	
Invalid/blank votes	3,031	7.22	
Total votes	42,005	100.00	
Registered voters/turnout	77,289	54.35	
Source: ANGE

Abdi
Party	Votes	%	Seats
Patriotic Salvation Movement	30,688	64.21	1
National People's Convention	17,104	35.79	0
Total	47,792	100.00	1
Valid votes	47,792	96.98	
Invalid/blank votes	1,487	3.02	
Total votes	49,279	100.00	
Registered voters/turnout	61,353	80.32	
Source: ANGE

Tissi
Party	Votes	%	Seats
Patriotic Salvation Movement	12,984	45.82	1
National Union for Democracy and Renewal	8,944	31.56	0
Reformist Party	6,412	22.63	0
Total	28,340	100.00	1
Valid votes	28,340	94.77	
Invalid/blank votes	1,563	5.23	
Total votes	29,903	100.00	
Registered voters/turnout	41,997	71.20	
Source: ANGE

Ade
Party	Votes	%	Seats
Patriotic Salvation Movement	41,930	71.30	1
Reformist Party	16,875	28.70	0
Total	58,805	100.00	1
Valid votes	58,805	99.00	
Invalid/blank votes	592	1.00	
Total votes	59,397	100.00	
Registered voters/turnout	68,805	86.33	
Source: ANGE

Koukou Angara
Party	Votes	%	Seats
Patriotic Salvation Movement	11,990	46.00	1
National Rally of Chadian Democrats	8,217	31.53	0
Gathering of the United Sons of Chad for Development	5,856	22.47	0
Total	26,063	100.00	1
Valid votes	26,063	88.79	
Invalid/blank votes	3,291	11.21	
Total votes	29,354	100.00	
Registered voters/turnout	45,467	64.56	
Source: ANGE

Tandjile Est
Party	Votes	%	Seats
Patriotic Salvation Movement	6,636	24.26	1
Chadian Socialist Action for Renewal	3,450	12.61	1
Federation, Action for the Republic	2,069	7.57	0
National Union for Democracy and Renewal	1,850	6.76	0
Popular Action Framework for Solidarity and Unity of the Republic	1,655	6.05	0
Party for Democratic Renewal in Chad	1,623	5.93	0
National Rally for Development and Progress	1,440	5.27	0
Action for the Republic, Democracy and Development	1,412	5.16	0
National Rally of Chadian Democrats	1,278	4.67	0
Rally for Democracy and Socialism in Chad	1,096	4.01	0
Union for Democracy and the Republic/Social Democratic Party	997	3.65	0
Popular Party for Social Justice/Workers Front for the Redemption of Chad	995	3.64	0
Party of Democrats and Socialists	994	3.63	0
Mojes	955	3.49	0
Al Nassour	899	3.29	0
Total	27,349	100.00	2
Valid votes	27,349	91.99	
Invalid/blank votes	2,383	8.01	
Total votes	29,732	100.00	
Registered voters/turnout	100,096	29.70	
Source: ANGE

Tendjile Centre
Party	Votes	%	Seats
National Rally of Chadian Democrats	12,548	64.73	1
Patriotic Salvation Movement	3,559	18.36	0
Party for Rally and Equity in Chad	962	4.96	0
Chadian Democratic Party	884	4.56	0
Chadian Socialist Action for Renewal	858	4.43	0
National Rally for Development and Progress	574	2.96	0
Total	19,385	100.00	1
Valid votes	19,385	91.48	
Invalid/blank votes	1,805	8.52	
Total votes	21,190	100.00	
Registered voters/turnout	59,143	35.83	
Source: ANGE

Tandjile Ouest
Party	Votes	%	Seats
Movement for Equality and Citizens' Rally	12,354	26.43	1
Party of Democrats and Socialists	8,936	19.11	1
National Rally for Development and Progress	7,593	16.24	1
Patriotic Salvation Movement	3,283	7.02	0
National Rally of Chadian Democrats	2,108	4.51	0
Action for the Republic, Democracy and Development	1,517	3.24	0
Rally for Democracy and Progress	1,363	2.92	0
Mojes	1,311	2.80	0
Union for the National Democratic Upsurge	1,243	2.66	0
Al Wassat	1,168	2.50	0
Chadian Convention for Peace and Development	1,059	2.27	0
Party for Integral Democracy and Independence	1,059	2.27	0
National Union for Democracy and Renewal	1,038	2.22	0
Union for Democracy and the Republic/Social Democratic Party	1,024	2.19	0
Citizens Party of Chad	851	1.82	0
Convention for Democracy and Federalism	844	1.81	0
Total	46,751	100.00	3
Valid votes	46,751	88.63	
Invalid/blank votes	5,998	11.37	
Total votes	52,749	100.00	
Registered voters/turnout	170,051	31.02	
Source: ANGE

Manga
Party	Votes	%	Seats
Patriotic Salvation Movement	6,165	22.89	1
National Union for Democracy and Renewal	2,881	10.70	1
Chadian Convention for Peace and Development	2,185	8.11	0
Party for Democracy and Social Justice	2,067	7.67	0
Party for Rally and Equity in Chad	2,062	7.66	0
Federation, Action for the Republic	2,057	7.64	0
Alliance for Democracy, Integrity and Freedom	1,869	6.94	0
Chadian Socialist Action for Renewal	1,815	6.74	0
Chadian Democratic Union	1,701	6.32	0
National Rally for Development and Progress	1,507	5.60	0
Action for the Republic, Democracy and Development	1,402	5.21	0
Popular Action Framework for Solidarity and Unity of the Republic	1,221	4.53	0
Total	26,932	100.00	2
Valid votes	26,932	89.46	
Invalid/blank votes	3,173	10.54	
Total votes	30,105	100.00	
Registered voters/turnout	75,822	39.70	
Source: ANGE

Man-Mbague
Party	Votes	%	Seats
Patriotic Salvation Movement	6,056	43.71	1
National Rally of Chadian Democrats	1,438	10.38	0
Les Elites	1,344	9.70	0
Alliance for Democracy, Integrity and Freedom	1,249	9.01	0
Chadian Socialist Action for Renewal	1,215	8.77	0
New Breath for the Republic/Popular Movement for Reform	1,014	7.32	0
National Demobilization and Reintegration Program	782	5.64	0
Union for the National Democratic Upsurge	758	5.47	0
Total	13,856	100.00	1
Valid votes	13,856	94.93	
Invalid/blank votes	740	5.07	
Total votes	14,596	100.00	
Registered voters/turnout	30,501	47.85	
Source: ANGE

Bardaï
Party	Votes	%	Seats
Patriotic Salvation Movement	3,060	64.91	1
National Union for Democracy and Renewal	1,654	35.09	0
Total	4,714	100.00	1
Valid votes	4,714	99.24	
Invalid/blank votes	36	0.76	
Total votes	4,750	100.00	
Registered voters/turnout	6,489	73.20	
Source: ANGE

Zouar
Party	Votes	%	Seats
Patriotic Salvation Movement	3,128	66.98	1
Rally for Justice and the Environment	1,542	33.02	0
Total	4,670	100.00	1
Valid votes	4,670	95.38	
Invalid/blank votes	226	4.62	
Total votes	4,896	100.00	
Registered voters/turnout	7,243	67.60	
Source: ANGE

Aouzou
Party	Votes	%	Seats
Patriotic Salvation Movement	2,818	100.00	1
Total	2,818	100.00	1
Valid votes	2,818	93.03	
Invalid/blank votes	211	6.97	
Total votes	3,029	100.00	
Registered voters/turnout	4,798	63.13	
Source: ANGE

Wour
Party	Votes	%	Seats
Patriotic Salvation Movement	20,967	100.00	1
Total	20,967	100.00	1
Valid votes	20,967	91.71	
Invalid/blank votes	1,895	8.29	
Total votes	22,862	100.00	
Registered voters/turnout	33,414	68.42	
Source: ANGE

Zoumri
Party	Votes	%	Seats
Patriotic Salvation Movement	596	65.42	1
Movement for Democracy and Justice in Chad	315	34.58	0
Total	911	100.00	1
Valid votes	911	95.49	
Invalid/blank votes	43	4.51	
Total votes	954	100.00	
Registered voters/turnout	1,271	75.06	
Source: ANGE

Emi-Koussi
Party	Votes	%	Seats
Patriotic Salvation Movement	498	66.49	1
Movement for Democracy and Justice in Chad	251	33.51	0
Total	749	100.00	1
Valid votes	749	97.53	
Invalid/blank votes	19	2.47	
Total votes	768	100.00	
Registered voters/turnout	1,030	74.56	
Source: ANGE

Biltine
Party	Votes	%	Seats
Party for Liberty and Development	18,064	41.62	1
Patriotic Salvation Movement	15,661	36.09	0
National Democratic Union for Change	3,659	8.43	0
Party for Justice and Freedom	3,325	7.66	0
Reformist Party	2,689	6.20	0
Total	43,398	100.00	1
Valid votes	43,398	96.51	
Invalid/blank votes	1,569	3.49	
Total votes	44,967	100.00	
Registered voters/turnout	65,639	68.51	
Source: ANGE

Dar-Tama
Party	Votes	%	Seats
Patriotic Salvation Movement	85,776	100.00	2
Total	85,776	100.00	2
Valid votes	85,776	97.84	
Invalid/blank votes	1,893	2.16	
Total votes	87,669	100.00	
Registered voters/turnout	112,442	77.97	
Source: ANGE

Megri
Party	Votes	%	Seats
Patriotic Salvation Movement	21,317	100.00	1
Total	21,317	100.00	1
Valid votes	21,317	93.49	
Invalid/blank votes	1,485	6.51	
Total votes	22,802	100.00	
Registered voters/turnout	29,089	78.39	
Source: ANGE

Iriba
Party	Votes	%	Seats
Patriotic Salvation Movement	33,468	98.22	1
Union for the Refoundation of Chad	605	1.78	0
Total	34,073	100.00	1
Valid votes	34,073	94.93	
Invalid/blank votes	1,821	5.07	
Total votes	35,894	100.00	
Registered voters/turnout	44,900	79.94	
Source: ANGE

Al-Biher
Party	Votes	%	Seats
Patriotic Salvation Movement	4,934	49.08	1
Horizon Movement for Democracy	3,013	29.97	0
UPPP	2,106	20.95	0
Total	10,053	100.00	1
Valid votes	10,053	90.14	
Invalid/blank votes	1,100	9.86	
Total votes	11,153	100.00	
Registered voters/turnout	19,797	56.34	
Source: ANGE

Dar-al-Fawakih
Party	Votes	%	Seats
Patriotic Salvation Movement	37,162	100.00	1
Total	37,162	100.00	1
Valid votes	37,162	91.70	
Invalid/blank votes	3,363	8.30	
Total votes	40,525	100.00	
Registered voters/turnout	53,465	75.80	
Source: ANGE

Tine
Party	Votes	%	Seats
Patriotic Salvation Movement	14,609	65.95	1
Union of Resistance Forces	7,544	34.05	0
Total	22,153	100.00	1
Valid votes	22,153	99.53	
Invalid/blank votes	104	0.47	
Total votes	22,257	100.00	
Registered voters/turnout	28,614	77.78	
Source: ANGE

== See also ==
- 2024 Chadian presidential election
