= 2006 in Africa =

== Incumbents ==
- Algeria
  - President – Abdelaziz Bouteflika, President of Algeria (1999–2019)
  - Prime Minister –
    1. Ahmed Ouyahia, Prime Minister of Algeria (2004–2006)
    2. Abdelaziz Belkhadem, Prime Minister of Algeria (2006–2008)
- Angola
  - President – José Eduardo dos Santos, President of Angola (1979–2017)
  - Prime Minister – Fernando da Piedade Dias dos Santos, Prime Minister of Angola (2002–2008)
- Benin
  - President –
    1. Mathieu Kérékou, President of Benin (1996–2006)
    2. Thomas Boni Yayi, President of Benin (2006–2016)
- Botswana
  - President – Festus Mogae, President of Botswana (1998–2008)
- Burundi
  - President – Pierre Nkurunziza, President of Burundi (2005–2020)
- Cameroon
  - President – Paul Biya, President of Cameroon (1982–present)
  - Prime Minister Ephraïm Inoni, Prime Minister of Cameroon (2004–2009)
- Cape Verde
  - President – Pedro Pires, President of Cape Verde (2001–2011)
  - Prime Minister – José Maria Neves, Prime Minister of Cape Verde (2001–2016)
- Central African Republic
  - President – François Bozizé, President of Central African Republic (2003–2013)
  - Prime Minister – Élie Doté, Prime Minister of Central African Republic (2005–2008)
- Chad
  - President – Idriss Déby, President of Chad (1990–2021)
  - Prime Minister – Pascal Yoadimnadji, Prime Minister of Chad (2005–2007)
- Comoros
  - President –
    1. Azali Assoumani, President of Comoros (2002–2006)
    2. Ahmed Abdallah Mohamed Sambi, President of Comoros (2006–2011)
- Republic of the Congo
  - President – Denis Sassou Nguesso, President of the Republic of the Congo (1997–present)
  - Prime Minister – Isidore Mvouba, Prime Minister of the Republic of the Congo (2005–2009)
- Côte d'Ivoire
  - President – Laurent Gbagbo, President of Côte d'Ivoire (2000–2011)
  - Prime Minister –
    1. Seydou Diarra, Prime Minister of Côte d'Ivoire (2003–2005)
    2. Charles Konan Banny, Prime Minister of Côte d'Ivoire (2005–2007)
- (Democratic Republic of the Congo) Democratic Republic of the Congo
  - President – Joseph Kabila, President of the Democratic Republic of the Congo (2001–2019)
  - Prime Minister – Antoine Gizenga, Prime Minister of the Democratic Republic of the Congo (2006–2008)
- Djibouti
  - President – Ismaïl Omar Guelleh, President of Djibouti (1999–present)
  - Prime Minister – Dileita Mohamed Dileita, Prime Minister of Djibouti (2001–2013)
- Egypt
  - President – Hosni Mubarak, President of Egypt (1981–2011)
  - Prime Minister – Ahmed Nazif, Prime Minister of Egypt (2004–2011)
- Equatorial Guinea
  - President – Teodoro Obiang Nguema Mbasogo, President of Equatorial Guinea (1982–present)
  - Prime Minister –
    1. Miguel Abia Biteo Boricó, Prime Minister of Equatorial Guinea (2004–2006)
    2. Ricardo Mangue Obama Nfubea, Prime Minister of Equatorial Guinea (2006–2008)
- Eritrea
  - President – Isaias Afwerki, President of Eritrea (1993–present)
- Ethiopia
  - President – Girma Wolde-Giorgis, President of Ethiopia (2001-2013)
  - Prime Minister – Meles Zenawi, Prime Minister of Ethiopia (1995-2012)
- Gabon
  - President – Omar Bongo, President of Gabon (1967–2009)
  - Prime Minister –
    1. Jean-François Ntoutoume Emane, Prime Minister of Gabon (1999-2006)
    2. Jean Eyeghé Ndong, Prime Minister of Gabon (2006-2009)
- Gambia
  - President – Yahya Jammeh, President of Gambia (1996-2017)
- Ghana
  - President – John Kufuor, President of Ghana (2001-2009)
- Guinea
  - President – Lansana Conté, President of Guinea (1984-2008)
- Guinea-Bissau
  - President – João Bernardo Vieira, President of Guinea-Bissau (2005–2009)
  - Prime Minister – Aristides Gomes, Prime Minister of Guinea-Bissau (2005–2007)
- Kenya
  - President – Mwai Kibaki, President of Kenya (2002–2013)
- Lesotho
  - Monarch – Letsie III, Monarch of Lesotho (1996–present)
  - Prime Minister – Pakalitha Mosisili, Prime Minister of Lesotho (1998–2012)
- Liberia
  - President –
    1. Gyude Bryant, Chairman of the Transitional Government (2003–2006)
    2. Ellen Sirleaf Johnson, President of Liberia (2006–2018)
- Libya
  - President – Muhammad az-Zanati, Chairman of the Presidential Council (1992–2008)
  - Prime Minister –
    1. Shukri Ghanem, Prime Minister of Libya (2003–2006)
    2. Baghdadi Mahmudi, Prime Minister of Libya (2006–2011)
- Malawi
  - President – Bingu wa Mutharika, President of Malawi (2004–2012)
- Mali
  - President – Amadou Toumani Touré, President of Mali (2002–2012)
  - Prime Minister – Ousmane Issoufi Maïga, Prime Minister of Mali (2004–2007)
- Mauritania
  - President – Ely Ould Mohamed Vall, President of Mauritania (2005–2007)
  - Prime Minister – Sidi Mohamed Ould Boubacar, Prime Minister of Mauritania (2005–2007)
- Mauritius
  - President – Sir Anerood Jugnauth, President of Mauritius (2003–2012)
  - Prime Minister – Dr. Navin Ramgoolam, Prime Minister of Mauritius (2005–2014)
- Morocco
  - King – Mohammed VI, King of Morocco (1999–present)
  - Prime Minister – Driss Jettou, Prime Minister of Morocco (2002–2007)
- Mozambique
  - President – Armando Guebuza, President of Mozambique (2005–2015)
  - Prime Minister – Luísa Diogo, Prime Minister of Mozambique (2004–2010)
- Namibia
  - President – Hifikepunye Pohamba, President of Namibia (2005–2015)
  - Prime Minister – Nahas Angula, Prime Minister of Namibia (2005-2012)
- Niger
  - President – Mamadou Tandja, President of Niger (1999–2010)
  - Prime Minister – Hama Amadou, Prime Minister of Niger (2000–2007)
- Nigeria
  - President – Olusegun Obasanjo, President of Nigeria (1999-2007)
- Rwanda
  - President – Paul Kagame, President of Rwanda (2000–2007)
  - Prime Minister – Bernard Makuza, Prime Minister of Rwanda (2000–2011)
- Sao Tome and Principe
  - President – Fradique de Menezes, President of Sao Tome and Principe (2003–2011)
  - Prime Minister –
    1. Maria do Carmo Silveira, Prime Minister of Sao Tome and Principe (2005–2006)
    2. Tomé Vera Cruz, Prime Minister of Sao Tome and Principe (2006–2008)
- Senegal
  - President – Abdoulaye Wade, President of Senegal (2000–2012)
  - Prime Minister – Macky Sall, Prime Minister of Senegal (2004–2007)
- Seychelles
  - President – James Michel, President of Seychelles (2004–2016)
- Sierra Leone
  - President – Ahmad Tejan Kabbah, President of Sierra Leone (1998–2007)
- Somalia
  - President – Abdullahi Yusuf Ahmed, President of Somalia (2004–2008)
  - Prime Minister – Ali Mohammed Ghedi, Prime Minister of Somalia (2004–2007)
- South Africa
  - President – Thabo Mbeki, President of South Africa (1999–2008)
- Sudan
  - President – Omar al-Bashir, President of Sudan (1989–2019)
- Tanzania
  - President – Jakaya Kikwete, President of Tanzania (2005–2015)
  - Prime Minister – Edward Lowassa, Prime Minister of Tanzania (2005–2008)
- Togo
  - President – Faure Gnassingbé, President of Togo (2005–present)
  - Prime Minister –
    1. Edem Kodjo, Prime Minister of Togo (2005–2006)
    2. Yawovi Agboyibo, Prime Minister of Togo (2006–2007)
- Tunisia
  - President – Zine El Abidine Ben Ali, President of Tunisia (1987–2011)
  - Prime Minister – Mohamed Ghannouchi, Prime Minister of Tunisia (1999–2011)
- Uganda
  - President – Yoweri Museveni, President of Uganda (1986–present)
  - Prime Minister – Apolo Nsibambi, Prime Minister of Uganda (1999–2011)
- Zambia
  - President – Levy Mwanawasa, President of Zambia (2002–2008)
- Zimbabwe
  - President – Robert Mugabe, President of Zimbabwe (1987–2017)

== International organizations ==
=== African Union (AU) ===
- The AU met in Khartoum on January 23 and January 24, 2006. It decided against the extradition of former Chadian president Hissène Habré to Belgium and announced the formation of a commission to find an African judiciary to try him. Denis Sassou Nguesso, President of the Republic of the Congo, became the Chairperson of the African Union's Assembly of Heads of State. The chair was originally supposed to return to Sudan, but at the request of several AU members, President of Sudan Omar al-Bashir decided to relinquish his position in view of the AU's participation in the resolution of the Darfur conflict. Members agreed that his chairmanship would affect the credibility of the AU.

=== Economic Community of West African States (ECOWAS) ===
- The Ordinary Summit of ECOWAS was held in Niamey on 13 January 2006 with the Heads of State of Niger (Tandja Mamadou), Mali (Amadou Toumani Touré), Togo (Faure Gnassingbé), Guinea-Bissau (Joao Bernardo Vieira) and Nigeria (Olusegun Obasanjo). The 10 other member countries were represented by their Foreign Ministers. The ECOWAS asked the G8 to extend the cancellation of debt to the whole of the Member States of the organization. It re-elected its chair Tandja Mamadou and decided to transform the secretariat into a commission with a President, a vice-president and 7 Commissioners. ECOWAS is pleased with the nomination by consensus of a Prime Minister and the composition of a government of national unity in Côte d’Ivoire, as well as the presidential elections being held in Liberia and in Guinea-Bissau. On the economic level, the Heads of State expressed their support for a plan to create a regional airline company "to overcome the difficulties in air transport" in the subregion.
- During the summit in Abuja on 14 June 2006, the Heads of States of ECOWAS approved a modification of the organization's hierarchy. The secretariat is to be replaced by a commission of the nine police chiefs of the member states. The 4-year term of the police chiefs from Burkina Faso, Côte d’Ivoire, Ghana, Mali, Niger, Nigeria, Senegal, Sierra Leone and Togo will begin in January 2007. Ghana will head the commission, while Burkina Faso will take the vice-presidency. ECOWAS also adopted a convention which aims "to prohibit the sale of light weapons within the community and between member states, except for the legitimate defense needs of these states or for their participation in peacekeeping operations".
- The joint summit of ECOWAS and UEMOA planned for December 22 and December 23, 2006, was cancelled following confrontations between soldiers and police officers in Ouagadougou on December 20.

=== Economic and Monetary Community of Central Africa (CEMAC) ===
- The 7th Summit of CEMAC was held in Libreville (Gabon) on March 16, 2006. The heads of state of the organization decided to form a strategic international committee to discuss and plan the proposed restructuring of the CEMAC's institutions. They were also concerned with the renewed spread of avian influenza brought up by Cameroon and gave its support to Chadian president Idriss Déby Itno in his opposition of Sudanese actions. Idriss Déby holds the chair of CEMAC.

=== West African Economic and Monetary Union (UEMOA) ===
- The 10th Ordinary Summit of the heads of state and government of the UEMOA took place on March 27, 2006, in Niamey with presidents Tandja Mamadou (Niger), Mathieu Kérékou (Benin), Blaise Compaoré (Burkina Faso), Amadou Toumani Touré (Mali), Abdoulaye Wade (Senegal), Faure Gnassingbé (Togo) and prime ministers Charles Konan Banny (Côte d'Ivoire) and Aristide Gomé (Guinea-Bissau). The heads of state could not agree on whether to allow Charles Konan Banny (the appointed Prime Minister of Côte d'Ivoire) and Yayi Boni (the newly elected President of Benin) to ascend to the presidencies of the Central Bank of West Africa and Development Bank of West Africa respectively. They instead decided to lengthen the terms of the current temporary presidents, Damo Justin Barro (Burkina Faso) of the Central Bank and Issa Coulibaly (Mali) of the Development Bank until the next summit.
- The joint summit of ECOWAS and UEMOA planned for December 22 and December 23, 2006, was cancelled following confrontations between soldiers and police officers in Ouagadougou on December 20.

=== Other organizations ===
- The 6th World Social Forum (WSF), an alter-globalization movement, took place in Bamako from January 19 to January 23, 2006. The debt problem was at the heart of the agenda for the meeting. For Barry Aminata Touré, president of the Coalition of African Alternatives to Debt and Development, "the simple cancellation of debt of Third World nations is finally putting poor countries on the developing track". Agriculture, and in particular genetically modified organisms, access to water, and immigration were some of the other topics brought up by participants. According to Diadié Yacouba Dagnoko, former Minister for Culture and one of the coordinators of the WSF, the forum, which accommodated between 15,000 and 20,000 participants, cost 700 million CFA francs. Falling under the framework for this WSF, the Collectif citoyen pour la restitution et le développement intégré du rail (Cocidirail) requested for the renationalisation of the rail network, and for the reopening of shut down stations. It promised to beat incumbent president of Mali Amadou Toumani Touré if he recontested in the 2007 elections to protest against his false election promises.
- The 5th Forum des peuples, an annual alter-globalization demonstration, was held in Gao from July 14 to July 17, 2006. The majority of the participants came from Africa but representatives from Europe and North America were also present. In a final declaration, the participants pledged "the removal of the International Monetary Fund and World Bank Group and the setting up of new institutions controlled democratically by the various nations and their citizens with real and sustained development", the stop of privatization and nationalization of strategic companies and the total and unconditional cancellation of debt of Third World countries. The participants also rejected "the policy of repressive and selective immigration" and demanded a quick resolution to the conflicts in Darfur, Côte d'Ivoire and the Middle East.
- The 2nd summit of the International Conference on the Great Lakes Region (IC/GLR) took place in Nairobi on December 14 and December 15, 2006. Representatives from 11 states in the Great Lakes Region, including heads of state, government officials and delegates from the African Union and United Nations met to sign a security pact to protect regional stability and development, which envisages a development plan costing US$ 2 billion, to be financed by member states, investors and the African Development Bank.
- In July, the Pan-African Non-Petroleum Producers Association members sign a treaty.

== Elections ==
- Benin (politics, elections):

In the Beninese presidential election, 2006, held on March 5, the outgoing president Mathieu Kérékou was barred from entering due to the age limit. However, he still actively criticised the organization of the election after the first round, and along with several other political parties (such as the opposition Benin Rebirth Party), openly suggested electoral fraud. International observers, some from ECOWAS, concluded that the poll had taken place under satisfactory conditions and transparency. According to results validated by the constitutional court, Yayi Boni took the lead in the first round with 35.60% of the vote, in front of Adrien Houngbédji with 24.23%. In the second round, Boni won the presidency with a majority of 74.29% against Houndbédji.

- Burkina Faso (politics, elections):

In the Burkinabe municipal election, 2006, held on April 23, most of the vote went to incumbent president Blaise Compaoré's Congress for Democracy and Progress.

- Cape Verde (politics, elections):

In the Cape Verdean legislative election, 2006, held on January 22, the African Party of Independence of Cape Verde (PAICV) triumphed, garnering 50.52% of the vote (40 seats), beating the main opposition party, the Movement for Democracy (MpD) with 28 seats, and the Democratic and Independent Cape Verdean Union (UCID) with 2 seats.

In the Cape Verdean presidential election, 2006, held on February 12, Pedro Pires, the incumbent, was challenged by former prime minister Carlos Veiga. Pires, with 50.98% of the vote, narrowly beat Veiga, with 49.02%, thus retaining his presidency, in a repeat of the 2001 election.

- Chad (politics, elections):

In the Chadian presidential election, 2006, held on May 3 in the midst of the Second Chadian Civil War, incumbent president Idriss Déby won 64.67% of the vote, thus retaining his presidency. Most opposition political parties refused to participate in what they termed a "masquerade". Voter turnout was extremely low, at 53.1%.

- Comoros (politics, elections):

In the Comorian presidential election, 2006, held in two rounds on April 16 and May 14, Ahmed Abdallah Mohamed Sambi defeated all opponents with a 58.02% majority of the national vote, succeeding Azali Assoumani in the first peaceful transfer of power in modern Comorian history.

- Democratic Republic of the Congo (politics, elections):

In the Democratic Republic of the Congo general election, 2006, held on July 30 and October 29 in two rounds, the incumbent Joseph Kabila was elected president. The first round saw 33 candidates running for president and 9,000 candidates running for the 500 seats in the National Assembly. Kabila had garnered 44.81% of the vote, while his main opponent, Jean-Pierre Bemba, only won 20.03%. Kabila's People's Party for Reconstruction and Democracy won 110 seats in the Assembly, compared to the 64 seats won by Bemba's Movement for the Liberation of Congo. The second round, a presidential run-off, saw the deployment of the world's largest United Nations peacekeeping mission, UNMOC. On November 15, the Independent Electoral Commission (CEI) announced that Kabila had won the vote with 58.05%, while Bemba had received only 41.95% support, and declared Kabila president. Voter turnout was 65.36% for the second round. Despite Bemba's rejection of the outcome, the Supreme Court upheld the election result, stating that Kabila was the winner by "absolute majority". Throughout the year, rioting and violence was rampant in many parts of the country. This was the first multi-party election since 1960.

- Gabon (politics, elections):

In the Gabonese legislative election, 2006, held on December 17, confirmed results from the constitutional court stated that the 7 government coalition parties in support of the incumbent president, Omar Bongo had garnered a majority. Out of the total 120 seats, coalition parties had won a total of 99 seats, compared to the 17 won by the 6 parties of the opposition. The remaining 4 seats were won by independents. An overwhelming 82 seats were won by Bongo's Gabonese Democratic Party alone. No major incidents related to the election were reported.

- Madagascar (politics, elections):

In the Malagasy presidential election, 2006, held on December 3, incumbent president Marc Ravalomanana was voted in for a second term in office with 54.80%, prevailing over 13 other candidates. Voter turnout was estimated at 61.45%. Confusion over preliminary results led opposition candidates to question the validity of the elections, and official complaints were filed to the constitutional court. On December 23, the court ruled that Ravalomanana had indeed won the election. Several weeks before, a coup attempt related to the election occurred. Furthermore, some candidates were barred from participating for various reasons.

- Mauritania (politics, elections):

In the Mauritanian constitutional referendum, 2006, held on June 26, 96.97% voted to adopt a new constitution. Voter turnout was 76.51%.

In the Mauritanian parliamentary and municipal elections, 2006, held on November 19 and December 3, the coalition of former opposition parties won 39 seats, while moderate Islamist independents won 41 seats. The former ruling party, the Republican Party for Democracy and Renewal, won the remaining 7 seats. The elections were considered to be free and transparent by all observers and political parties.

- Seychelles (politics, elections):

In the Seychellois presidential election, 2006, held from July 28 through July 30, the incumbent president James Michel of the Seychelles People's Progressive Front was re-elected with 53.73% of the vote. His main opponent, Wavel Ramkalawan of the Seychelles National Party, won 45.71% of the vote. Voter turnout was 88.7%.

- Uganda (politics, elections):

In the Ugandan general election, 2006, held on February 23, the incumbent president Yoweri Museveni garnered 59.2% of the vote, compared to Kizza Besigye's 37.3%. Besigye's Forum for Democratic Change (FDC) party rejected the results, alleging electoral fraud. Judges of the Supreme Court of Uganda narrowly voted to uphold the election result, despite many mentions of irregularities. The election was also the first multi-party poll since 1986. However, a multitude of charges were brought against Besigye in the months leading up to the election, sparking claims of fabrication and widespread protests by Besigye supporters.

- Zambia (politics, elections):

In the Zambian general election, 2006, held on September 28, Levy Mwanawasa won the single-round presidential election with 43.0%, beating main opponents Michael Sata and Hakainde Hichilema, with a voter turnout of 70.77%. In the simultaneously conducted parliamentary election, out of the 150 elected seats in the National Assembly, Mwanawasa's Movement for Multiparty Democracy secured 72 seats, while Sata's Patriotic Front won 46 seats, and the United Democratic Alliance returned with 27 seats.

== Conflict and civil war ==
=== Darfur conflict ===
President of Sudan Omar al-Bashir refuses the deployment of 20,000 Blue Helmets in a United Nations peacekeeping force in Darfur in accordance with United Nations Security Council Resolution 1706 adopted on September 1.

== Education ==
- June 2006: The 2006 Abdou Moumouni University protests over financial obligations to students from the university cause the temporary closure of Niger's only public university, Abdou Moumouni University in Niamey.

== Sports ==
=== Athletics ===
- Cameroon: eleventh edition of the "Race of Hope for Africa". This competition, organized by the Cameroon Athletics Federation joined a thousand athletes on a course of 42 km that included a climb of Mount Cameroon.

=== Cycling ===
- Gabon: the international cycle race Tropical Amissa Bongo was held from 12 January to 15 January.

=== Wrestling ===
- Senegal: a "fight of the century" was organized on 1 January in Dakar between two great figures of Senegalese wrestling. Yakhya Diop, alias Tékini won from Mohamed Ndao, alias Tyson.

== Culture ==
=== Film ===
- Benin: Fourth edition of Quintessence, international film festival in Ouidah from 7 to 11 January.

== See also ==
- List of state leaders in 2006 § Africa

== Notes ==
This text is being translated from the original French-language article.
