= Bombardment of Ennedi =

- Part of Insurgency in Chad (2016–present)
Date	February 3–6, 2019
Location	Ennedi Plateau, Chad
Result	Franco-Chadian victory

Belligerents
France; Chad	Union of Resistance Forces

Commanders and leaders
Unknown	Ousmane Teguen (surrendered)

Strength
7 Mirage 2000 jets 2 C-135 refueling jets 1 MQ-9 drone	400 men 50 vehicles

Casualties and losses
None	10 killed 267 prisoners 20-40 vehicles destroyed

Between February 3 and 6, 2019, French Air Force jets bombed a convoy of Union of Resistance Forces (UFR) rebels in the Ennedi Plateau, Chad. Ten rebels were killed in the bombardment, and over 250 more surrendered to French and Chadian government forces following the bombing.

== Background ==
In January 2019, the Libyan National Army under Khalifa Haftar launched an offensive to retake southern Libya, which had become a safe haven for jihadist groups, Chadian rebel groups, and Sudanese rebel groups. The LNA offensive was carried out with French and Chadian assistance. Chadian rebels of the Union of Resistance Forces (UFR), at the time based south of Murzuk, preferred to leave southern Libya than face the LNA. The UFR began a week-long offensive to regain territory in Chad, although the group didn't have the power it had during the Chadian Civil War of 2005 to 2010. The UFR's objective was to take territory in the Ennedi Plateau, rather than launching a rebellion against Idriss Déby. France, as an active player in Operation Barkhane based in N'Djamena, doesn't want the Chadian government to be destabilized.

== Bombardment ==
On the night of January 31 and February 1, 2019, a column of about fifty UFR vehicles crossed the Libyan border into Chad. On February 1 and 2, the Chadian air force carried out airstrikes to warn the rebels to turn around, but this did not dissuade them. The UFR column was then targeted by the French air force in the Ennedi desert. At 6pm on February 3, after a warning flight overhead, the French air force bombed the convoy to hinder it's progress. Further strikes occurred on February 5 and 6. French forces mobilized seven Mirage 2000 jets, five based at the 172 Fort Lamy airbase in N'Djamena and two from the 101 Niamey airbase, refueled by two C-135s and aided by a MQ-9 reaper drone. About twenty airstrikes were carried out on the rebels.

The French Ministry of Foreign Affairs declared in a press release that they had helped the Chadian government counter the incursion from Libya. After the airstrikes, Chadian forces based in the bases at Ounianga Kébir and Fada deployed to Bao, where the airstrikes took place. On February 5, several rebels surrendered to government forces in Amdjarass. The leader of the column, Lieutenant Ousmane Tegeun and his forces aboard ten pickups took refuge in a cave near Bao Billa before surrendering. Other fighters hid in the mountains of Hadjer Marfain.

After the airstrikes, UFR spokesman Youssouf Hamid said "A battle is lost, but not the war. We didn't know France would intervene. Normally, they do intelligence, we know that. We didn't expect strikes. There wasn't a single fight between (UFR fighters) and the Chadian army. It was France that fought, not the Chadians."

== Aftermath ==
=== Casualties ===
On February 6, the French army released a statement claiming to have destroyed twenty pick-ups. The Chadian government stated on February 9 that 250 rebels had been taken prisoner including Ousmane Tegeun, who commanded the column, and that about forty vehicles had been destroyed. RFI reported that about a hundred rebels had surrendered, and AFP reported that ten rebels were killed.

The prisoners were gathered in Amdjarass and then taken to the Koro Toro prison. Chadian authorities stated that the prisoners wouldn't be tried by a military court, instead a civilian one, and that they would be prosecuted for terrorism.

=== Reactions ===
French Prime Minister Jean-Yves Le Drian justified the bombings on February 12: "There was an attack by a rebel group from southern Libya, which is destabilized, to take power by force in Ndjamena and President Déby asked us in writing for an intervention to prevent this coup d'état from southern Libya and to protect his own country. This is entirely in accordance with international law and the Prime Minister informed the President of the Senate and the National Assembly of this."

Chadian democratic opposition and anti-Deby movements criticized the airstrikes who accosted French interference in Chadian internal security. Mahamat Ahmat Alhabo, secretary-general of the Freedom and Development Party (PLD), the party of one of Deby's main opponents Ibni Oumar Mahamat Saleh, notably urged the French government to stop interfering in Chadian internal security. Ngarlejy Yorongar, coordinator of Federation, Action for the Republic said that "it's not normal for France to support Deby." French analyst Martin David accused the government of supporting the Chadian dictatorship.

=== Trials ===
The verdict for the rebels was delivered on August 27, 2019. Twelve were sentenced to 20 years in prison, 231 in terms ranging from 10 to 15 years, and 24 minors were released. UFR leader Timane Erdimi was sentenced to life in prison in absentia. The verdict was criticized by UFR spokesman Hamid, who didn't recognize the number of 267 prisoners. Hamid stated that around 100 prisoners were taken by the French because the French bombed them.
