= Ibni Oumar Mahamat Saleh =

Chadian politician

Ibni Oumar Mahamat Saleh (December 31, 1949 – disappeared February 2008) is a Chadian politician and opposition leader who headed the Party for Liberties and Development (PLD).

== Early life and education ==
Saleh was born in Biltine, Chad. He is from Wadi Fira Region in eastern Chad and is a member of the Maba ethnic group. He studied Sciences (Mathematics) at the University of Orleans in France and obtained his PhD in 1978. He was a leader of the student movement named FEANF (Federation of Black African Students in France) and a leader of the first movement of rebellion in Chad named FROLINAT. He was also a professor and researcher in mathematics in France, Algeria, Niger, Chad (at the University of N'Djamena).

== Government ==
During Hissène Habré's presidency (1982–90) Ibni Oumar was Minister of Livestock, Higher Education, Scientific Research and Cooperation and Planning (1982–1990), and under his successor Idriss Déby he was Rector of the University of Chad and continued to hold ministerial positions (Cooperation 1991-94). Saleh founded a political party, the Party for Liberties and Development (Parti pour les Libertés et le Développement, PLD), in 1993. He was dismissed as Minister of Planning and Cooperation by Déby on May 17, 1994.

== Party for Liberties and Development ==
As of February 2008, Ibni Oumar Mahamat Saleh was Secretary-General of the PLD, as well as the Secretary-General and Spokesman of the Coordination of Political Parties for the Defense of the Constitution (CPDC), which groups 21 parties. He was the PLD candidate in the May 2001 presidential election; the fairness of the election, which was won by incumbent president Idriss Déby, was hotly contested by Saleh and the other opposition candidates. Saleh was arrested at this time. He boycotted the parliamentary election of 2002, the constitutional referendum of 2005 and the presidential election of 2006, saying that there were not sufficient guarantees that the processes would be free and fair.

== Arrest and disappearance ==
On February 3, 2008, during a battle between government forces and rebels in N'Djamena, Saleh was arrested by unidentified military personnel, presumably presidential guards, according to the PLD. More than a week later, no information had been released about the arrest or about where Saleh was being held. One of Saleh's cousins expressed particular concern on the grounds that Saleh had been very ill for some time, hoping that medicine, food and clothing could be brought to him wherever he was being held. On February 27, with still no information available about Saleh's whereabouts or condition, his wife met with Carla Bruni, the visiting French President's wife Nicolas Sarkozy. President Sarkozy asked his counterpart Idriss Déby to meet with her as well, but on February 28 she eventually refused to meet with Déby.

Fellow opposition leader Ngarlejy Yorongar, who had been arrested the same day than Saleh, said on March 6, 2008 that he believed Saleh had probably died as a result of his treatment in captivity. According to Yorongar, Saleh was severely beaten and it would, in Yorongar's opinion, be miraculous if he had survived such treatment. He urged the French to work to have the truth of the situation disclosed. A cousin of Saleh said at this time that his family had still not received any information and that they were very worried. Saleh is the father of four children.

The three French Mathematical Societies, SFdS, SMAI and SMF have created in 2009 the prize Ibni Oumar Mahamat Saleh in his memory.

According to an investigation in 2020 by online newspaper Le Média, Mahamat Ismaïl Chaïbo, then executive at Agence nationale de sécurité, moved Ibni Saleh severely beaten but still alive, during the night of February 3, 2008 from a cell in the Farcha district of N'Djamena to the presidential palace, downtown. There, president Idriss Déby engaged in a cover-up by not allowing Saleh's transfer to an hospital. Saleh died during that night; from that moment, the official stance on Saleh's whereabouts would be: « We are searching for him. ».

== Commission of enquiry ==
On March 17, 2008, the CPDC coalition called for Saleh's release and for the establishment of a "truly international and truly independent commission of inquiry" to investigate the matter, rather than the commission established by the government. A new and more independent commission was set up to replace the earlier commission on April 2.

The commission heard testimony from over 1,500 people, including high-ranking officials and the Chadian President himself; its report was submitted to Déby on August 5, 2008 and publicized a month later on September 3. This report concluded that Saleh had been arrested by the army at his home in N'Djamena on February 3, but said that it was not possible to reach a conclusion on what happened to him afterwards due to lack of evidence, while noting that "people think he is now dead". The commission raised also some doubts about Yorongar's testimony. Speaking after the report's release, his son, Mohamed Saleh, denounced it as a "parody", and he alleged that Déby was responsible for Saleh's death. According to Mohamed Saleh, Déby ordered the Republican Guard to arrest Saleh, who was then taken to the presidential palace, where he was tortured and killed. Mohamed Saleh demanded that the authorities turn his father's body over to his family.

Several French MPs or senators, notably Jean-Pierre Sueur, a senator for the Orléans area, where Ibni Saleh did his PhD, pressured the French government for declassifying the documents relating to the French military intervention in February 2008, when France used their troops stationed in Chad to clear up the government. However it is unlikely the French government will release evidence incriminating Déby's team, especially when France is soliciting Chadian help for their strikes against rebel forces in Mali of January 2013.
In 2017, the French minister of Defence indicated that he declassified the documents requested by the judges in charge of the inquest.
