= Sy Koumbo Singa Gali =

Chadian journalist and activist (born 1961)

- Born: 8 October 1961 (age 63); N'Djamena, Chad
- Occupation(s): Human rights activist Journalist
- Years active: 1988–present

Sy Koumbo Singa Gali (born 8 October 1961) is a Chadian journalist and human rights activist. She joined the Chadian Ministry of Information in 1982 and remained there until 1990. Gali then worked for Jean Alingué Bawoyeu, the Chadian Prime Minister between 1991 and 1993 before becoming a journalist. She established the newspaper L'Observateur in early 1997. Gali has twice served prison sentences for her work. She worked for the United Nations as a volunteer and served as a public information officer for its peace keeping UN Organisation Mission in the Democratic Republic of the Congo called MONUSCO in 2007.

== Early life and education ==
On 8 October 1961, Gali was born in the Chadian capital of N'Djamena, the second of sixteen children of parents from the Southern Chadian Sara-speaking clans. She was brought up in the poor N'Djamena neighbourhood of Ridina. Gali's interest in education was supported by both of her parents and went to secondary school at the Lycée Feminin before she was expelled for playing a prank on a French teacher. She moved to another high school and finished her studying there. When she was 18 years old, she became a mother out of wedlock to a man she later married and then divorced; Gali escaped to the south as a result of the Chadian Civil War.

== Career ==
Gali passed her baccalaureate examinations in 1982 and joined the country's Ministry of Information under president Hissène Habré. She was sent to study abroad in Canada and the United States in 1984 with government financial support allowing her to train in Paris and later Senegal. In December 1987, Gali graduated from Dakar's l'Ecole de Journalisme and went back to Chad on 8 January 1988. She remained an employee of the Ministry of Information until Habré was deposed as president by Idriss Déby in 1990. Gali worked for Jean Alingué Bawoyeu, the Chadian Prime Minister between 1991 and 1993. She joined the staff of the newspaper Contact before leaving to establish her own newspaper L'Observateur in early 1997. Gali began an online version of the newspaper and its circulation grew from 1,000 to 5,000 by 2001. She was arrested on the orders of the politician Wadel Abdelkader Kamougué for libel in 1998 and served a ten-day prison sentence. In 2001, Gali was elected the coalition of Chadian non-governmental organisations Organisation des Acteurs Non Étatiques du Tchad's representative.

Four years later, she was arrested for incitement to hate and popular unrest and had the possibility of serving a three-year prison sentence. It came when a letter criticising Déby who had several members of the Kreda ethnic group arrested had emerged. She was sentenced to 12 months in prison and fined FCFA100,000 in August 2005. Gali's imprisonment was heavily protested by Amnesty International and other human rights groups. She was released from prison by an appeals court the following month, citing "procedural irregularities". When she was released, Gali said to journalists: "Is our liberation a sign of a new openness? I don't know. That remains to be seen." She was against Déby in the 2006 Chadian presidential election and praised aid given to Sudanese rebels by Chad. Gali went on to work for the United Nations as a volunteer and was a public information officer with its peace keeping UN Organisation Mission in the Democratic Republic of the Congo called MONUSCO in 2007, having been motivated to use the job in order to share her experience with others that needed it.
