= 2002 Chadian parliamentary election =

- 21 April 2002
- 155 seats in the National Assembly; 78 seats needed for a majority
- Turnout: 52.40%
Party	Leader	Seats	+/–
MPS	Nagoum Yamassoum	113	+48
RDP	Lol Mahamat Choua	10	+7
FAR	Ngarlejy Yorongar	10	+9
RNDP	Delwa Koumakoye	5	+5
UNDR	Saleh Kebzabo	5	−10
URD	Wadel Abdelkader Kamougué	3	−26
ACTUS	Fidèle Moungar	1	−1
ART	Oumar Boukar	1	+1
MPDT	Mahamat Abdoulaye	1	New
CNDF	Ali Golhor	1	New
CNDS	Adoum Daye Zere	1	0
RPR–Lingui		1	+1
RNDT–Le Réveil	Albert Pahimi Padacké	1	New
UN		1	+1
RFDT		1	+1
This lists parties that won seats. See the complete results below.

Parliamentary elections were held in Chad on 21 April 2002. The result was a victory for the ruling Patriotic Salvation Movement (MPS), which won 113 of the 155 seats in the National Assembly. (Note: The exact number of seats won by MPS varies by source. The Journal of Democracy reports 112, the Inter-Parliamentary Union reports 112 or 113, and the U.S. State Department and Committee to Protect Journalists report 110. However, the IPU's value of 113 seats is the only one from a full party-by-party breakdown of the 155 seats.)

== Background ==
The Chadian constitution called for elections in April or May 2001, but the country's Independent National Electoral Commission requested a one-year postponement due to insufficient funding. The number of seats in the Assembly was increased from 125 in the previous session to 155.

== Campaign ==
Prior to the elections the MPS formed an electoral alliance with the opposition Rally for Democracy and Progress (RDP), weakening the opposition already divided by a boycott by the Party for Liberty and Development (PLD) and the Union for Democracy and Republic (UDR). The PLD and the UDR claimed that the authorities did not provide sufficient guarantees that the elections would be free and fair. However, almost 40 parties did contest the elections, putting forward a total of 427 candidates.

The MPS ran unopposed in 45 constituencies in northern Chad, whilst parties allied with the MPS were unopposed in a further 20 seats. The MPS was the only party to have a candidate running in every parliamentary district.

The government banned all political programming from the radio ahead of the elections, which the Committee to Protect Journalists considered an attempt to favor the ruling party, MPS. The ban lasted from 30 March to 20 April. The United States Department of State also charged that the Chadian government had used faulty census data to bias the parliamentary district divisions in MPS's favor.

== Results ==
Voter turnout was moderately high, except in the capital N'Djamena where only 22% of the registered voters cast a vote.

Party	Votes	%	Seats	+/–
Patriotic Salvation Movement			113	+48
Rally for Democracy and Progress			10	+7
Federation, Action for the Republic			10	+9
National Rally for Development and Progress			5	+5
National Union for Democracy and Renewal			5	–10
Union for Renewal and Democracy			3	–26
Chadian Action for Unity and Socialism			1	–1
Action for Renewal of Chad			1	+1
People's Movement for Democracy in Chad			1	New
National Democratic and Federal Convention			1	New
National Democratic and Social Convention			1	0
Rally for the Republic – Lingui			1	+1
National Rally of Chadian Democrats			1	New
National Union			1	+1
Rally of Democratic Forces in Chad			1	+1
Total			155	+55
Total votes	2,185,646	–		
Registered voters/turnout	4,171,169	52.40		
Source: IPU

== Aftermath ==
Following the election, the National Assembly held its first session on 10 June, electing Nassour Guelendouksia Ouaido of the MPS as President of the National Assembly.
