= Brahim Koulamallah =

Chadian politician

Brahim Ahmed Koulamallah is a Chadian politician. He was the candidate of the Renewed African Socialist Movement in the May 2006 presidential election, taking fifth (and last) place with 5.31% of the vote. In the government named on August 15, 2006, he was appointed Minister of Tourism Development. He was replaced in this post by Ahmat Barkai Animi in the government announced on April 23, 2008.
