= APNPP =

Association of 15 African nations

Member states

The APNPP, an acronym of "l’association des pays non producteurs de pétrole" (in English: the "Pan-African Non-Petroleum Producers Association"), is an association of 15 African nations that signed a treaty in July 2006.

Their stated aim is to work together to promote biofuel production and reduce the effects of high oil prices.

The APNPP, which was first proposed by Abdoulaye Wade, is being led by the Ministry of Energy and Mines of Senegal. As of January 2008, the acting head is Madické Niang.

== Members (and HDI) ==
- Benin (HDI: 0.525)
- Burkina Faso (HDI: 0.449)
- The Democratic Republic of the Congo (HDI: 0.479)
- Gambia (HDI: 0.500)
- Ghana (HDI: 0.632)
- Guinea (HDI: 0.465)
- Guinea-Bissau (HDI: 0.483)
- Madagascar (HDI: 0.501)
- Mali (HDI: 0.428)
- Morocco (HDI: 0.683)
- Niger (HDI: 0.400)
- Senegal (HDI: 0.511)
- Sierra Leone (HDI: 0.477)
- Togo (HDI: 0.539)
- Zambia (HDI: 0.565)
