= Rally for the Republic – Lingui =

Political party in Chad

The Rally for the Republic – Lingui (French: Rassemblement pour la République - Lingui) is a political party of Chad. At the 2002 parliamentary election it won 1 out of 155 seats.
