= Rally of Democratic Forces in Chad =

Political party in Chad

The Rally of Democratic Forces in Chad (French: Rassemblement des forces démocratiques au Tchad) is a political party in Chad, part of the ruling coalition in 2001.

It was reportedly led by either Bernard Mbangadou or Djembété Le Soromian in 1994, after the latter served as minister under Hissène Habré. The leniency shown by its manifesto for the Tombalbaye government led it to be described as a southern-aligned political party. Le Soromian was later the leader of the similarly named Chadian Democratic Rally, signatory of the Cotonou peace agreements in 2007.

In the 2002 parliamentary elections, the party won 1 out of 155 seats according to IPU Parline.

The party was under the leadership of Alexandre Begue, also reported as "Begne Alexandre", from at least 2008 to 2014.

In October 2023, the party joined the Cadre national de concertation des partis politiques (CNCP).
