= National Rally of Chadian Democrats =

Political party in Chad

National Rally of Chadian Democrats Rassemblement national des démocrates tchadiens – le reveil التجمع الوطني للديمقراطية في تشاد
- Abbreviation: RNDT–Le Réveil
- Leader: Albert Pahimi Padacké
- Founded: ~2002
- Ideology: Social democracy Democratic socialism
- Political position: Centre-left to left-wing
- International affiliation: Centrist Democrat International
- National Assembly: 12 / 188
- Senate: 2 / 69

The National Rally of Chadian Democrats (RNDT–Le Réveil; French: Rassemblement national des démocrates tchadiens – le reveil), formerly the National Rally for Democracy in Chad (French: Rassemblement national pour la démocratie au Tchad – le réveil), is a political party in Chad led by Albert Pahimi Padacké. It is considered a semi-opposition party that was allied with the ruling Patriotic Salvation Movement (MPS) during the rule of Idriss Déby, and the party participated in the government a few times during this period.

In the parliamentary election held on 21 April 2002, the party won one out of 155 seats. In the 2006 presidential election, its candidate Albert Pahimi Padacké won 7.82% of the vote.

== Election results ==
=== Presidential elections ===
Election	Party candidate	Votes	%	Votes	%	Result
Election	Party candidate	First round		Second round		Result
2006	Albert Pahimi Padacké	225,368	7.82%	—N/a		Lost ✗
2011	Albert Pahimi Padacké	170,182	6.03%	—N/a		Lost ✗
2016	Did not contest					
2021	Albert Pahimi Padacké	476,464	10.32%	—N/a		Lost ✗
2024	Albert Pahimi Padacké	1,048,015	16.93%	—N/a		Lost ✗

=== National Assembly elections ===
Election	Party leader	Votes	%	Seats	+/–	Government
2002	Albert Pahimi Padacké			1 / 155	New	Opposition
2011	Albert Pahimi Padacké			8 / 187	▲7	Opposition
2024	Albert Pahimi Padacké	379,653	6.96%	11 / 188	▲3	Opposition
