= 2006 Chadian presidential election =

Second re-election of Idriss Déby

- 3 May 2006
- Registered: 5,697,922
- Turnout: 53.08% (▼8.29pp)
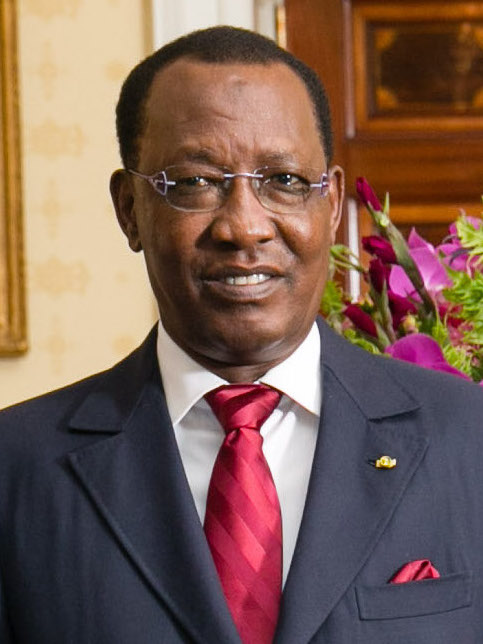

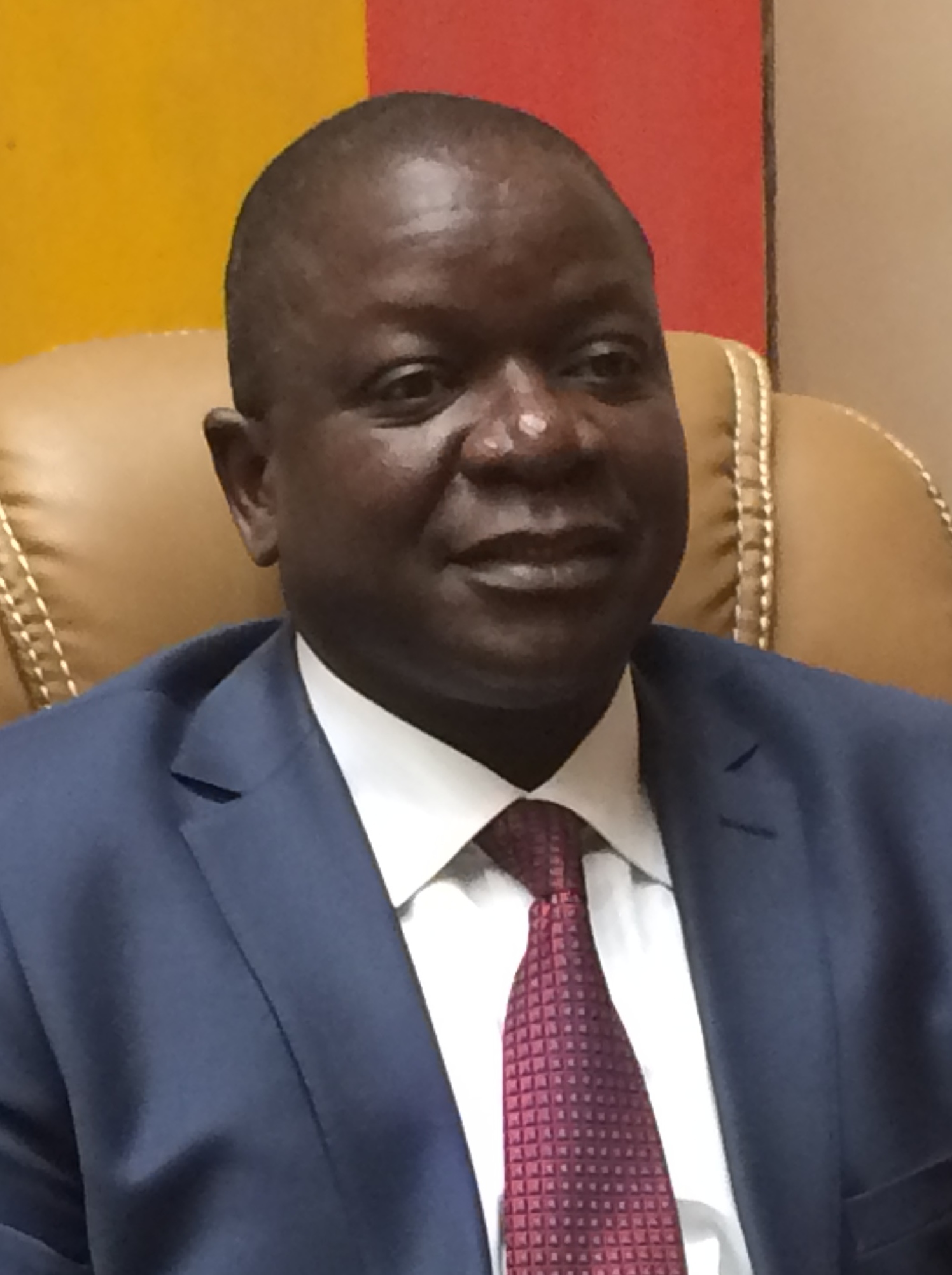

Candidate	Idriss Déby	Delwa Kassiré Koumakoye	Albert Pahimi Padacké
Party	MPS	RNDP	RNDT–Le Réveil
Popular vote	1,863,042	435,997	225,368
Percentage	64.67%	15.13%	7.82%
Candidate	Mahamat Abdoulaye	Brahim Koulamallah
Party	MPDT	MSAR
Popular vote	203,637	152,940
Percentage	7.07%	5.31%
President before election
Idriss Déby
MPS
Elected President
Idriss Déby
MPS

Presidential elections were held in Chad on 3 May 2006. A referendum in 2005 had led to changes to the constitution that made it possible for President Idriss Déby to run for a third term; having come to power in December 1990, he had previously won elections in 1996 and 2001. Despite a serious rebellion based in the east of the country, the elections were held on schedule; Déby was re-elected with about 65% of the vote, according to official results. The main opposition parties boycotted the election.

== Background ==
At the time of the elections the country faced increasing tensions with Sudan, high unemployment, and a growing insurgency fueled by deserting members of the Chadian military and the United Front for Democratic Change rebel group. An attempted coup was made on 14 March 2006, but was put down by members of the army loyal to Déby. Chadian journalist Sy Koumbo Singa Gali claimed the election would "be a non-event. It's Déby against Déby." There were nearly 12,000 polling stations.

== Campaign ==
The elections were the first in the history of Chad in which no major opposition candidate participated, with most political parties in Chad boycotting the elections in response to Déby's decision to run for a third term. The only candidates were Déby, Agriculture Minister Albert Pahimi Padacké for the National Rally for Democracy in Chad, former Prime Minister Delwa Kassiré Koumakoye for the National Rally for Development and Progress, Mahamat Abdoulaye for the People's Movement for Democracy in Chad, and Brahim Koulamallah for the Renewed African Socialist Movement party; the latter three were representatives of political parties allied with Déby's Patriotic Salvation Movement party.

On 25 March opposition leader Lol Mahamat Choua said in a speech to about one thousand supporters at a rally in N'Djamena "We staunchly reaffirm that we are not taking part and will not endorse this masquerade. The elections announced for 3 May will not take place. They must not take place. You must contribute actively toward this end." In a meeting in mid March between Chadian opposition leaders, Prime Minister Pascal Yoadimnadji, and United Nations representatives, Ngarlejy Yorongar, who ran against Déby in 1996 and 2001, but boycotted the 2006 election, presented an 18-point proposal that called for a six-month extension of Déby's presidency to reform the electoral process. "Déby has refused our proposal; that's why I am not participating in the upcoming election."

== Results ==
Initially, it was announced by the Independent National Electoral Commission (CENI) that Déby had won 77.6% of the vote. Proclaiming the final results on 28 May, the Constitutional Council revised this downward, declaring Déby the winner with 64.67% of the vote; it also placed turnout at 53.08%. Although rebel groups did not disrupt voting as they had threatened to, voter turnout was reported to be "extremely low".

Candidate	Party	Votes	%
Idriss Déby	Patriotic Salvation Movement	1,863,042	64.67
Delwa Kassiré Koumakoye	National Rally for Development and Progress	436,002	15.13
Albert Pahimi Padacké	National Rally for Democracy in Chad	225,368	7.82
Mahamat Abdoulaye	People's Movement for Democracy in Chad	203,637	7.07
Brahim Koulamallah	Renewed African Socialist Movement	152,940	5.31
Total		2,880,989	100.00
Valid votes		2,880,989	95.26
Invalid/blank votes		143,237	4.74
Total votes		3,024,226	100.00
Registered voters/turnout		5,697,922	53.08
Source: African Elections Database

== Aftermath ==
Déby's victory was given the support of the African Union, but some Western diplomats expressed astonishment regarding the AU approval. Opposition groups called on the world to ignore the vote, and accused France, which maintains a military contingent in the country, of having backed Déby for its own interests. Dispute over voter turnout was acute, with the opposition maintaining a turnout of a mere 2%, while the chairman of CENI estimated turnout at around 60%.

Déby was sworn in for another term in office on 8 August 2006.
