= National Democratic and Federal Convention =

Political party in Chad

The National Democratic and Federal Convention (French: Convention nationale démocratique et fédérale) is a political party in Chad. According to IPU Parline, the party won 1 out of 155 seats in the 2002 Chadian parliamentary election. The party leader is Ali Golhor.
