= Renewed African Socialist Movement =

Political party in Chad

The Renewed African Socialist Movement (French: Mouvement socialiste africain renouveau) is a political party in Chad. It is considered a moderate opposition party allied with the ruling Patriotic Salvation Movement (MPS), and it participated in the government as of 2007.

Brahim Koulamallah was the party's candidate in the May 2006 presidential election, taking fifth (and last) place with 5.31% of the vote.
