= Party for Liberties and Development =

Political party in Chad

The Party for Liberties and Development (French: Parti pour les libertés et le développement or PLD) is a Chadian political party led by Ibni Oumar Mahamat Saleh. An opposition party based in the Muslim and Arab east, it took three seats in the 1997 parliamentary election. The party boycotted the 2002 parliamentary election, as it voiced doubts of a free and fair vote.

== Election results ==
=== National Assembly elections ===
| Election | Party leader | Votes | % | Votes | % | Seats | +/– | Position | Government |
| Election | Party leader | First round | | Second round | | Seats | +/– | Position | Government |
|---|---|---|---|---|---|---|---|---|---|
| 1997 | Ibni Oumar Mahamat Saleh | 33,344 | 2.64% | —N/a | | 3 / 125 | New | ▲6th | Opposition |
| 2002 | Boycotted | | | | | 0 / 155 | ▼3 | —N/a | Extra-parliamentary |
| 2011 | Mahamat Ahamad Alhabo | in alliance with UNDR | | | | 12 / 187 | ▲12 | ▲2nd | Opposition |
| 2002 | Mahamat Ahamad Alhabo | 61,090 | 1.52% | —N/a | | 2 / 155 | ▼10 | ▼7th | Opposition |
