= National Union (Chad) =

Political party in Chad

The National Union (French: Union nationale) is a political party in Chad. In the 2002 legislative elections, the party won 1 out of 155 seats.
