= Union for Renewal and Democracy =

Political party in Chad

The Union for Renewal and Democracy (French: Union pour le renouveau et la démocratie) is a political party in Chad. Its current president is Sande Ngaryimbé, its first being Wadel Abdelkader Kamougué.

The party, which was founded by Kamougué, was founded in March 1992 and legalized in May 1992. In the 1996 presidential election, Kamougué, as the URD candidate, took second place in the first round on June 2 with 12.39% of the vote; in the second round, held on July 3, he was defeated by incumbent President Idriss Déby, taking 30.91% of the vote compared to Déby's 69.09%.

In the presidential election of 20 May 2001, Kamougué won 6.0% of the vote, and in the parliamentary election held on 21 April 2002, the URD won according to IPU Parline 3 out of 155 seats.

As of 2008, the URD is a member of the Coordination of Political Parties for the Defence of the Constitution (CPDC) opposition coalition.

After Kamougué died in 2011 while campaigning, Sande Ngaryimbé took over as the leader of the URD.
