= People's Movement for Democracy in Chad =

Political party in Chad

The People's Movement for Democracy in Chad (French: Mouvement populaire pour la démocratie au Tchad) is a political party in Chad.

In the parliamentary election held on 21 April 2002, the party won five out of 155 seats. In the May 2006 presidential election, its candidate, Mahamat Abdoulaye, won 7.07% of the vote.
