= Federation, Action for the Republic =

Political party in Chad

Federation, Action for the Republic Fédération, action pour la république الاتحاد، العمل من أجل الجمهورية
- Abbreviation: FAR/Parti Fédération
- Leader: Ngarlejy Yorongar
- Founded: ~1997
- Ideology: Federalism
- National Assembly: 2 / 188

Federation, Action for the Republic (French: Fédération, action pour la république, FAR/Parti Fédération) is a political party in Chad. It is considered a radical opposition party and is led by Ngarlejy Yorongar. The FAR supports federalism.

In the 1997 parliamentary election, the FAR won one seat in the National Assembly. Yorongar was the only FAR candidate to win a seat.

Its candidate for the 20 May 2001 presidential election, Yorongar, was a prominent critic of the Chad-Cameroon pipeline. According to official results, he won 396,864 votes, or 6.35%. Six opposition candidates were detained on May 30 after contesting the results. Yorongar, along with fellow opposition leader Abderhamane Djesnebaye, was tortured, including by being beaten with iron bars.

In the 2002 parliamentary election, the party won 10 out of 155 seats.

The party boycotted the 2006 presidential election.

The FAR was the only major opposition party to not sign a 2007 agreement that provided for improved electoral organization ahead of the next parliamentary election. According to Yorongar, the agreement was not satisfactory because it did not tackle the political and security problems in the nation. Instead, he recommended that there should be a national dialogue that includes everybody, from the rebels to the political opposition living in exile and those representing the civil societies. This is because he believed that a political resolution of the crisis cannot be achieved without involving everyone and not only the signatories of the agreement. Yorongar also doubted whether the elections can take place in the presence of an active rebel group in one section of the country.
