= Operation Juniper Shield =

Counter-terrorism military operation in Central Africa led by the US

- Part of the war on terror and the War in the Sahel
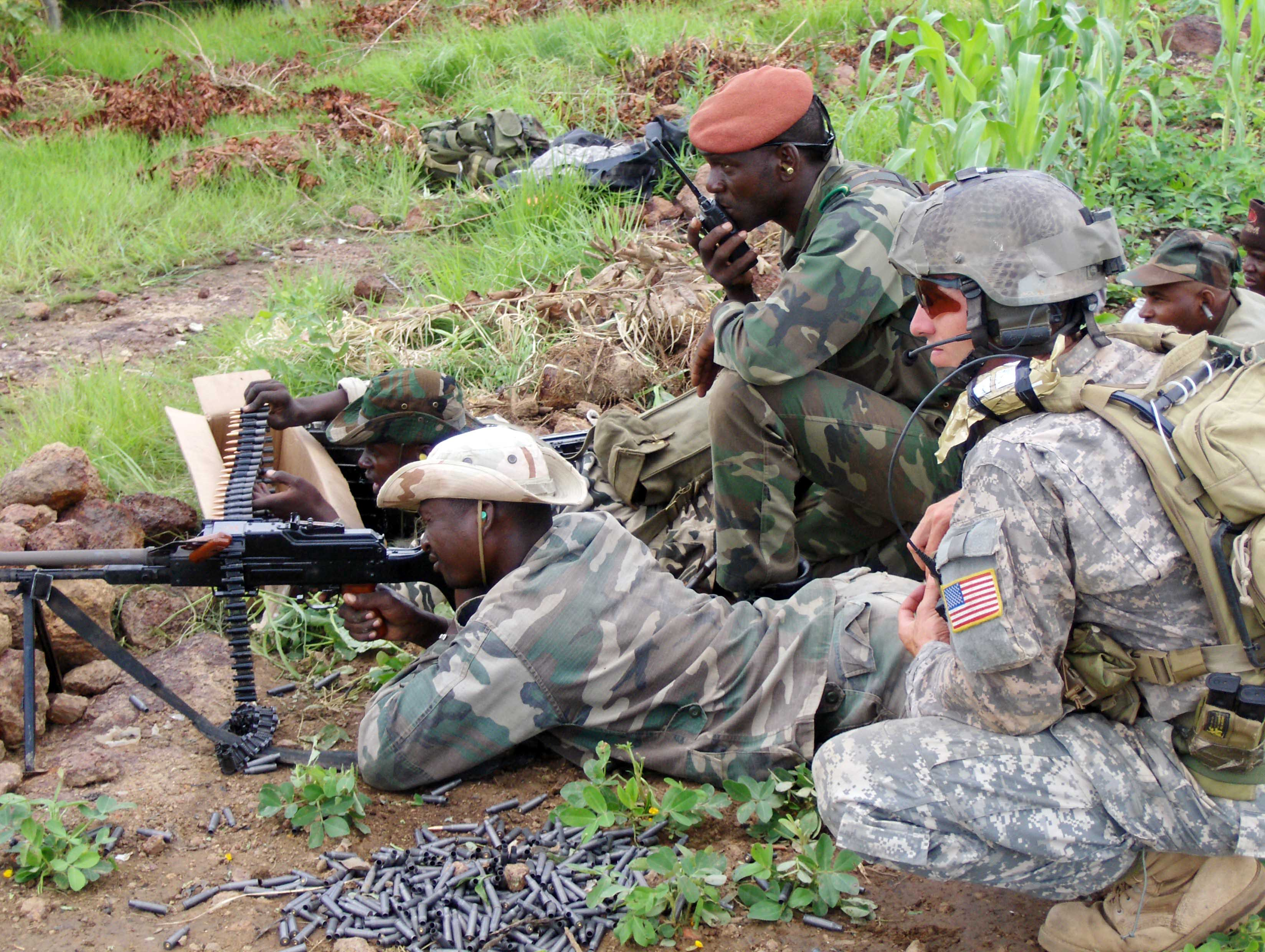
- A United States special forces NCO watches weapons marksmanship training for a member of a Malian counter-terrorism unit in December 2010.
Date	6 February 2007 – present (19 years, 8 months and 3 days)
Location	Sahara Desert and North Africa, West Africa
Result	Ongoing

Belligerents
United States; Algeria; Morocco; Mauritania; Tunisia; Burkina Faso; Chad; Mali; Niger; Nigeria; Senegal; Cameroon; Togo; Ghana; Ivory Coast; Benin; Cape Verde (The Gambia) Gambia; Guinea; Guinea-Bissau; Liberia; Sierra Leone Multi-national coalitions: (United Nations) MINUSMA (until 2023); AFISMA (from 2013); (European Union) EUTM Mali (from 2024)	Islamist militants; Al-Qaeda; Jama'at Nasr al-Islam wal Muslimin; MOJWA (until 2013); AQIM; Al-Mourabitoun (until 2017); Ansar al-Sharia; Macina Liberation Front; Ansar Dine (until 2017); Boko Haram (partially aligned with ISIL since 2015); Ansaru; ISIL; Islamic State in the Greater Sahara (2015–present); Islamic State – West Africa Province

Commanders and leaders
(Algeria) Abdelmadjid Tebboune (2019–present); (Algeria) Nadir Larbaoui (2023–present); (Morocco) Mohammed VI (2007–present); (Morocco) Aziz Akhannouch (2021–present); (Mauritania) Mohamed Ould Ghazouani (2019–present); (Mauritania) Mokhtar Ould Djay (2024–present); (Tunisia) Kais Saied (2019–present); (Tunisia) Ahmed Hachani (2023–present); (Burkina Faso) Ibrahim Traoré (2022–present); (Burkina Faso) Apollinaire Joachim Kyélem de Tambèla (2022–present); (Chad) Mahamat Déby (2021–present); (Chad) Saleh Kebzabo (2022–present); (Mali) Assimi Goïta (2021–present); (Mali) Choguel Kokalla Maïga (2021–present); (Niger) Abdourahamane Tiani (2023–present); (Niger) Ali Lamine Zeine (2023–present); (Nigeria) Bola Tinubu (2023–present); (Senegal) Bassirou Diomaye Faye (2024–present); (Senegal) Ousmane Sonko (2024–present); (Cameroon) Paul Biya (2007–present); (Cameroon) Joseph Ngute (2019–present); (Togo) Faure Gnassingbé (2007–present); (Togo) Victoire Tomegah Dogbé (2020–present); (Ghana) Nana Akufo-Addo (2017–present); (Ivory Coast) Alassane Ouattara (2010–present); (Ivory Coast) Robert Beugré Mambé (2023–present); (Benin) Patrice Talon (2016–present); (Cape Verde) José Maria Neves (2021–present); (Cape Verde) Ulisses Correia e Silva (2016–present); (The Gambia) Adama Barrow (2017–present); (Guinea) Mamady Doumbouya (2021–present); (Guinea) Bah Oury (2024–present); (Guinea-Bissau) Umaro Sissoco Embaló (2020–present); (Guinea-Bissau) Rui Duarte de Barros (2023–present); (Liberia) Joseph Boakai (2024–present); (Sierra Leone) Julius Maada Bio (2018–present); (United States) Donald Trump (2025–present); (United States) Pete Hegseth (2025–present); (United Kingdom) Charles III (2022–present); (United Kingdom) Keir Starmer (2024–present); (France) Emmanuel Macron (2017–present); (France) Gabriel Attal (2024–present); (Germany) Frank-Walter Steinmeier (2017–present); (Germany) Friedrich Merz (2025–present); (Netherlands) Willem-Alexander (2013–present); (Netherlands) Dick Schoof (2024–present); (Spain) Felipe VI (2014–present); (Spain) Pedro Sánchez (2018–present); (Denmark) Frederik X (2007–present); (Denmark) Mette Frederiksen (2019–present); (Czech Republic) Petr Pavel (2023–present); (Czech Republic) Petr Fiala (2021–present); (Sweden) Carl XVI Gustaf (2007–present); (Sweden) Ulf Kristersson (2022–present); Former: Abdelaziz Bouteflika †; Abdelkader Bensalah †; Abdelaziz Belkhadem; Ahmed Ouyahia; Abdelmalek Sellal; Youcef Yousfi; Noureddine Bedoui; Sabri Boukadoum; Abdelaziz Djerad; Aymen Benabderrahmane; Driss Jettou; Abbas El Fassi; Abdelilah Benkirane; Saadeddine Othmani; Ely Ould Mohamed Vall; Sidi Ould Cheikh Abdallahi; Ba Mamadou Mbaré; Mohamed Ould Abdel Aziz; Sidi Mohamed Ould Boubacar; Zeine Ould Zeidane; Yahya Ould Ahmed El Waghef; Moulaye Ould Mohamed Laghdaf; Yahya Ould Hademine; Mohamed Salem Ould Béchir; Ismail Ould Bedde Ould Cheikh Sidiya; Mohamed Ould Bilal; Zine El Abidine Ben Ali; Mohamed Ghannouchi; Fouad Mebazaa; Moncef Marzouki; Beji Caid Essebsi; Mohamed Ennaceur; Hamadi Jebali; Ali Laarayedh; Mehdi Jomaa; Habib Essid; Youssef Chahed; Elyes Fakhfakh; Hichem Mechichi; Najla Bouden; Blaise Compaoré; Honoré Traoré; Yacouba Isaac Zida; Michel Kafando; Gilbert Diendéré; Chérif Sy; Roch Marc Christian Kaboré; Paul-Henri Sandaogo Damiba; Paramanga Ernest Yonli; Tertius Zongo; Luc-Adolphe Tiao; Paul Kaba Thieba; Christophe Joseph Marie Dabiré; Lassina Zerbo; Albert Ouédraogo; Idriss Déby †; Pascal Yoadimnadji; Adoum Younousmi; Delwa Kassiré Koumakoye; Youssouf Saleh Abbas; Emmanuel Nadingar; Djimrangar Dadnadji; Kalzeubet Pahimi Deubet; Albert Pahimi Padacké; Amadou Toumani Touré; Amadou Sanogo; Dioncounda Traoré; Ibrahim Boubacar Keïta; Bah Ndaw; Ousmane Issoufi Maïga; Modibo Sidibé; Cissé Mariam Kaïdama Sidibé; Cheick Modibo Diarra; Django Sissoko; Oumar Tatam Ly; Moussa Mara; Modibo Keita; Abdoulaye Idrissa Maïga; Soumeylou Boubèye Maïga; Boubou Cissé; Moctar Ouane; Abdoulaye Maïga; Mamadou Tandja; Salou Djibo; Mahamadou Issoufou; Mohamed Bazoum; Hama Amadou; Seyni Oumarou; Albadé Abouba; Ali Badjo Gamatié; Mahamadou Danda; Brigi Rafini; Ouhoumoudou Mahamadou; Olusegun Obasanjo; Umaru Musa Yar'Adua; Goodluck Jonathan; Muhammadu Buhari; Abdoulaye Wade; Macky Sall; Cheikh Hadjibou Soumaré; Souleymane Ndéné Ndiaye; Abdoul Mbaye; Aminata Touré; Mahammed Dionne; Amadou Ba; Sidiki Kaba; Ephraïm Inoni; Philémon Yang; Yawovi Agboyibo; Komlan Mally; Gilbert Houngbo; Kwesi Ahoomey-Zunu; Komi Sélom Klassou; John Kufuor; John Atta Mills; John Mahama; Laurent Gbagbo; Charles Konan Banny †; Guillaume Soro; Gilbert Aké; Jeannot Ahoussou-Kouadio; Daniel Kablan Duncan; Amadou Gon Coulibaly †; Hamed Bakayoko †; (Ivory Coast) Patrick Achi; Mathieu Kérékou; Thomas Boni Yayi; Pascal Koupaki; Lionel Zinsou; Pedro Pires; Jorge Carlos Fonseca; Yahya Jammeh; Lansana Conté; Moussa Dadis Camara; Sékouba Konaté; Alpha Condé; Eugène Camara; Lansana Kouyaté; Ahmed Tidiane Souaré; Kabiné Komara; Jean-Marie Doré; Mohamed Said Fofana; Mamady Youla; Ibrahima Kassory Fofana; Mohamed Béavogui; Bernard Goumou; João Bernardo Vieira; Raimundo Pereira; Malam Bacai Sanhá; Mamadu Ture Kuruma; Manuel Serifo Nhamadjo; José Mário Vaz; Aristides Gomes; Martinho Ndafa Kabi; Carlos Correia; Carlos Gomes Júnior; Adiato Djaló Nandigna; Rui Duarte de Barros; Domingos Simões Pereira; Baciro Djá; Artur Silva; Faustino Imbali; Nuno Gomes Nabiam; Geraldo Martins; Ellen Johnson Sirleaf; George Weah; Ahmad Tejan Kabbah; Ernest Bai Koroma; George W. Bush; Barack Obama; Joe Biden; Robert Gates; Leon Panetta; Chuck Hagel; Ash Carter; Jim Mattis; Mark Esper; Lloyd Austin; Elizabeth II; Tony Blair; Gordon Brown; David Cameron; Theresa May; Boris Johnson; Liz Truss; Mary Simon; Justin Trudeau; Michaëlle Jean; David Johnston; Julie Payette; Stephen Harper; Jacques Chirac; Nicolas Sarkozy; François Hollande; Dominique de Villepin; François Fillon; Jean-Marc Ayrault; Manuel Valls; Bernard Cazeneuve; Édouard Philippe; Jean Castex; (France) Élisabeth Borne; Horst Köhler; Christian Wulff; Joachim Gauck; Angela Merkel; Beatrix; Jan Peter Balkenende; Mark Rutte; Juan Carlos I; José Luis Rodríguez Zapatero; Mariano Rajoy; (Denmark) Margrethe II; Anders Fogh Rasmussen; Lars Løkke Rasmussen; Helle Thorning-Schmidt; Václav Klaus; Miloš Zeman; Mirek Topolánek; Jan Fischer; Petr Nečas; Jiří Rusnok; Bohuslav Sobotka; Andrej Babiš; Fredrik Reinfeldt; Stefan Löfven; Magdalena Andersson	Abdelmalek Droukdel †; Abu Ubaidah Youssef al-Annabi; Mokhtar Belmokhtar †; Tiyib Ould Sidi Ali †; Athmane Touati (surrendered); Winan Bin Yousef (POW)

Strength
1,325+ American advisors & trainers; 900 Moroccans; 400 Malians; 250 Algerians; 200 Chadians; <1,000 Mauritanians; 25 Senegalese medical doctors	AQIM: 400–4,000; Tuaregs: ~1,000; Boko Haram: 300–2,000+

Casualties and losses
Unknown	Unknown
- Causes: September 11 attacks and 2003 Casablanca bombings

Operation Juniper Shield, formerly known as Operation Enduring Freedom – Trans Sahara (OEF-TS), is the military operation conducted by the United States and partner nations in the Saharan and Sahel regions of Africa, consisting of counterterrorism efforts and policing of arms and drug trafficking across central Africa. It is part of the Global War on Terrorism (GWOT). The other OEF mission in Africa is Operation Enduring Freedom – Horn of Africa (OEF-HOA).

Congress approved $500 million for the Trans-Saharan Counterterrorism Initiative (TSCTI) over six years to support countries involved in counterterrorism against alleged threats of al-Qaeda operating in African countries, primarily Algeria, Chad, Mali, Mauritania, Niger, Senegal, Nigeria, and Morocco. This program builds upon the former Pan Sahel Initiative (PSI), which concluded in December 2004 and focused on weapon and drug trafficking, as well as counterterrorism. TSCTI has both military and non-military components to it. OEF-TS is the military component of the program. Civil affairs elements include USAID educational efforts, airport security, Department of the Treasury, and State Department efforts.

Canada deployed teams of less than 15 CSOR members to Mali throughout 2011 to help combat militants in the Sahara. Although the special forces will not engage in combat, they will train the Malian military in basic soldiering. Areas include communications, planning, first aid, and providing aid to the general populace.

== Mission ==
Operation Enduring Freedom Trans Sahara is primarily a training mission meant to equip 10 nations to combat insurgents in the region. Africa Command states:

OEF-TS is the USG's 3rd priority counter terror effort conducting activities that support TSCTP but are not exclusive to TSCTP. OEF-TS supports TSCTP by forming relationships of peace, security, and cooperation among all Trans Sahara Nations. OEF-TS fosters collaboration and communication among participating countries. Furthermore, OEF-TS strengthens counterterrorism and border security, promotes democratic governance, reinforces bilateral military ties, and enhances development and institution building. U.S. Africa Command, through OEF-TS, provides training, equipment, assistance and advice to partner nation armed forces. This increases their capacity and capability to deny safe haven to terrorists and ultimately defeat extremist and terrorist activities in the region.

At some point in 2013, OEF-TS was redesignated as Operation Juniper Shield. Operation Juniper Shield encompasses American operations across Algeria, Burkina Faso, Cameroon, Chad, Mali, Mauritania, Morocco, Niger, Nigeria, Senegal, and Tunisia.

== Training programs ==
=== Flintlock ===
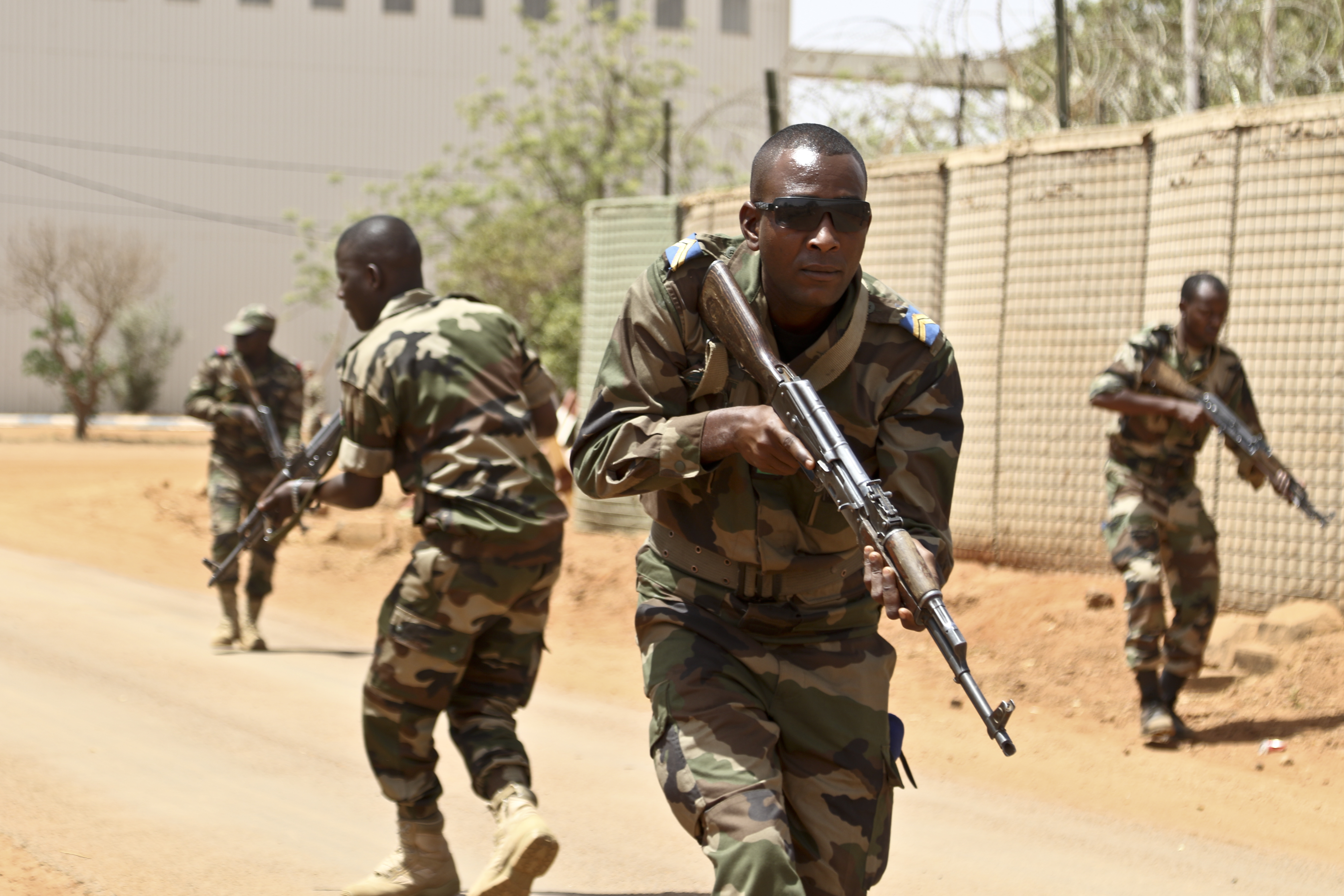
Nigerien soldiers train during Flintlock 2018 training exercises.

Twice a year, the Joint Combined Exchange Training (JCET) program holds a multinational training exercise. Called Flintlocks, these exercises are meant to strengthen special forces from the United States as well as multiple other nations. Participants include troops from the Sahel and those from NATO members. Flintlock started in 1988 and continued through Operation Enduring Freedom, and is now held in Africa. The exercises teach medical operations, infantry and peacekeeping training, airborne operations, humanitarian relief, and leadership skills. The amount each category is stressed depends on the host nation's needs. In addition, participants are put through different scenarios involving skills instructed during the exercise.

Mali was supposed to host the 2012 exercise, but the United States decided to postpone the exercise. Officials say Flintlock was postponed because Mali is facing a renewed Tuareg insurgency.

=== The Atlas Accord ===
Although the Flintlock Exercise was postponed, another training program in Mali was not. The Atlas Accord was created in 2012 to train African military personnel in a number of skills while focusing on logistics. The exercise includes classroom instruction and field instruction. Atlas Accord 12 focused solely on logistics and aerial resupply, while the next exercise in 2013 will continue training in aerial logistics but will also include command, control, communications, and computer (C4) techniques.

=== African Lion exercise ===
The largest training exercise, African Lion, is an annual security cooperation exercise held by the US and Morocco. Created in 2008, this program is designed to instruct a variety of skills, including aerial logistics, non-lethal weapons training, combined arms and maneuver exercises. More than 900 Moroccans and 1,200 Americans take part in the two-week exercise.

== History ==
On 12 September 2007, a USAF C-130 was damaged from rifle fire by Tuareg forces while the aircraft was engaged in a supply drop to besieged Malian soldiers, no Americans were wounded in the incident. The Joint Special Operations Command (JSOC) established the Joint Special Operations Task Force–Trans Sahara (JSOTF-TS) to help combat terrorism in the region. In 2012, the name of Operation Enduring Freedom - Trans Sahara transitioned to Operation Juniper Shield, although the operation was still referred to in US Government sources as OEF-TS as late as 2014.

ABC News reported that US forces arrived in Niger in early 2013 to support the French military intervention in Mali; 150 US personnel set up a surveillance drone operation over Mali that was conducted out of Niamey. As of 2017, there were about 800 US troops in Niger, the majority of whom are construction crews working to build up a second drone base in northern Niger. The remainder conduct a surveillance drone mission out of Niamey that helps out the French in Mali and other regional countries in the fight against the terrorists, and less than a hundred US Army Special Forces soldiers are also advising and assisting Niger's military to build up their fighting capability to counter the terrorists. CNN reported that following the Tongo Tongo ambush in October 2017, which left 4 US soldiers killed, the government of Niger granted the US military the authority to arm its drones in Niger; the US military had been seeking the authority to arm its drones in Niger for months prior to the ambush.

ABC News also reported that there are 300 U.S. military personnel in Burkina Faso and Cameroon carrying out the same task as US forces in Niger, The Guardian reported that the US military deployed 300 personnel to Cameroon in early October 2015, with the approval of the Cameroonian government, their primary mission was to provide intelligence support to local forces as well as conducting reconnaissance flights, The personnel are also overseeing a program to transfer American military vehicles to the Cameroonian Army to aid in their fight against Islamist militants, Army Times later reported that US soldiers in Cameroon are also providing IED awareness training to the country's infantry forces. CNN reported that in May 2016 that US personnel conduct the drone operations from Garoua to help provide intelligence in the region to assist local forces. In 2023, The 2023 Niger coup happens and leads to The Nigerien crisis.

== See also ==
- Tuareg Rebellion (2007–2009)
- Insurgency in the Maghreb (2002–present)
- Islamist insurgency in the Sahel
- 2012 Northern Mali conflict
- List of wars 2003-current

== Sources ==
- Comolli, Virginia (2015). Boko Haram: Nigeria's Islamist Insurgency. London: Oxford University Press.
