= Moussa Faki =

Chadian politician and diplomat

- موسى فكي
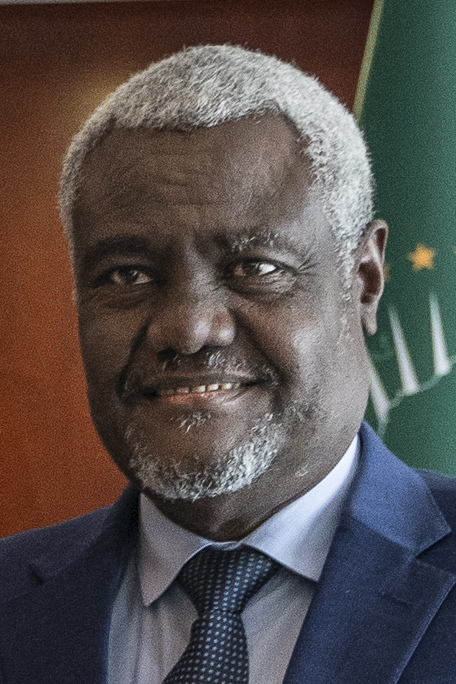
- Faki in 2023

Chair of the African Union Commission
- In office 14 March 2017 – 13 March 2025
- Deputy: Thomas Kwesi Quartey; Monique Nsanzabaganwa
- Preceded by: Nkosazana Dlamini-Zuma
- Succeeded by: Mahamoud Ali Youssouf

Minister of Foreign Affairs
- In office 23 April 2008 – 30 January 2017
- Prime Minister: Youssouf Saleh Abbas; Emmanuel Nadingar; Djimrangar Dadnadji; Kalzeubet Pahimi Deubet; Albert Pahimi Padacké
- Preceded by: Ahmad Allam-Mi
- Succeeded by: Hissein Brahim Taha

11th Prime Minister of Chad
- In office 24 June 2003 – 4 February 2005
- President: Idriss Déby
- Preceded by: Haroun Kabadi
- Succeeded by: Pascal Yoadimnadji

Personal details
- Born: 21 June 1960 (age 66) Biltine, Chad
- Party: Patriotic Salvation Movement

Moussa Faki Mahamat (Arabic: موسى فكي محمد, Mūsā Fakī Muḥammad; born 21 June 1960) is a Chadian politician and diplomat who was the Chairperson of the African Union Commission from 2017 to 2025. Previously he was Prime Minister of Chad from 24 June 2003 to 4 February 2005 and Minister of Foreign Affairs from April 2008 to January 2017. Faki, a member of the ruling Patriotic Salvation Movement (MPS), belongs to the Zaghawa ethnic group, the same group as the late President Idriss Déby.

On 6 February 2021, he was re-elected as Chairperson of the African Union Commission for another four year term from 2021–2024.

== Biography ==
Faki was born in the town of Biltine in eastern Chad. He attended university in Brazzaville in the Republic of the Congo, where he studied law. He went into exile when Hissein Habré took power on June 7, 1982 and joined the Democratic Revolutionary Council headed by Acheikh Ibn Oumar; however, he did not return to Chad when Acheikh joined with Habré in 1988. He eventually returned on 7 June 1991, after Déby took power. He was director-general of two ministries before serving as the Director-General of the National Sugar Company (SONASUT) between 1996 and 1999.

Subsequently, he served as Director of the Cabinet of President Déby from March 1999 to July 2002, and he was Déby's campaign director for the May 2001 presidential election. Faki was then appointed Minister of Public Works and Transport in the government of Prime Minister Haroun Kabadi, which was named on June 12, 2002. After a year in that post, he was appointed Prime Minister by Déby on June 24, 2003, replacing Kabadi. Faki resigned in early February 2005 amidst a civil service strike and a rumored quarrel with Déby.

Faki was nominated as a member of the Economic, Social and Cultural Council on 19 January 2007, and was then elected as the Council's President in mid-February 2007. In the government of Prime Minister Youssouf Saleh Abbas, which was announced on April 23, 2008, he was appointed Minister of Foreign Affairs. Hissein Brahim Taha was appointed to replace him as Chadian Minister of Foreign Affairs on 5 February 2017. Faki took office as Chairperson of the AU Commission on 14 March 2017.

== See also ==
- List of foreign ministers in 2017
- Mahamat Zene Cherif
- Hissein Brahim Taha
- Mahamat Saleh Annadif

Political offices
Preceded by Haroun Kabadi	Prime Minister of Chad; 2003–2005	Succeeded by Pascal Yoadimnadji
Preceded by Ahmad Allam-Mi	Minister of Foreign Affairs; 2008–2017	Succeeded by Hissein Brahim Taha
Positions in intergovernmental organisations
Preceded by Nkosazana Dlamini-Zuma	Chair of the African Union Commission; 2017–present	Incumbent
