= Chadian constitution of 1996 =

Fundamental law of Chad from 1996 to 2018

The Chadian constitution of 1996 (French: Constitution de la République du Tchad) was the supreme law of Chad from its adoption until 2018. The country's seventh constitution, it was adopted six years after President Idriss Déby rose to power following a successful rebellion against President Hissène Habré.

The 1996 constitution established the framework of the Chadian state and government and enumerated the rights and freedoms of its citizens. In its final form it included a preamble, 16 parts and 225 articles, having originally been composed of 15 parts and 239 articles. The constitution was controversially amended in 2005 amid fraud allegations, with the term limits for the presidency eliminated. It was replaced by a new text in 2018.

== Previous constitutions ==
Before the 1996 constitution was approved, Chad had already been subjected between 1959 and 1990 to eight constitutions. The first constitution was approved on March 31, 1959, when the country was still a French colony. The constitution originated a parliamentary system, with executive powers exercised for a five-years' term by a Prime Minister, subject to the confirmation of the National Assembly. This constitution was early replaced on November 28, 1960, when the country had just achieved independence, with a new one that introduced a semi-presidential system. President François Tombalbaye replaced that constitution on April 16, 1962, with a third constitution that provided for a fully presidential system. Under this constitution, the president was elected for a seven-years' term by a restricted electoral college, composed by National Assembly deputies, mayors, municipal councillors and chiefs. The new constitution also ushered the way to the one party-system by restricting election to the assembly through a single electoral list. The passage to one-party rule was later officialized through the constitutional law of December 29, 1965, amending the 1962 constitution. Eventually Tombalbaye opted for a new constitution in November 1973, on the wave of the cultural revolution and the demise of the Chadian Progressive Party in favour of the National Movement for the Cultural and Social Revolution, so that the new constitutional text would enshrine the regime's ideology.

Following the fall of Tombalbaye in 1975 and the accord between President Félix Malloum and the insurgent leader Hissène Habré in 1978, a new constitution was created on August 29, 1978, to make space for a coalition government, with the executive power shared between the President and the Prime Minister. As part of the coalition accord a National Council representative of all prefectures was set up, and also a Defence and Security Council in which Malloum and Habré partisans were given equal representation.

Another constitutional text to follow was the short-lived Declaration of N'Djamena, an interim-document originated on May 8, 1982, after long negotiatiations among the factions that composed the Transitional Government of National Unity. The declaration provided for an executive president, Goukouni Oueddei, and a 15-men policy-making organ in which all factions were by law to be represented. Members of the council could not stand in the cabinet, which awnsered to Goukouni and was headed by Prime Minister Djidingar Dono Ngardoum. After less than a month the declaration was already defunct, when Habré's forces conquered the capital on June 7. Once arrived to power, Habré engineered on September 29 a constitution in line with his needs and that of his faction, the Armed Forces of the North (FAN). The constitution provided for a powerful President that was both head of state and of government, put in its place by the FAN's political bureau. In case of high treason, the President was accountable for his acts before an ad hoc created FAN high court. A 30-strong members National Consultative Council was also projected, whose members were to come from all of Chad's prefectures and were appointed and dismissed by the President.

After Habré defeated Libya in the Toyota War, considerable French pressure was put on Chad to start a democratisation process and to proceed towards national reconciliation. As an answer to these pressures Habré's government produced in June 1989 a constitutional draft that was to establish a strong president elected for a seven-year term and reintroduced the National Assembly, always in the frame of a one-party system. With an official but improbable turnout of 99.4% a popular referendum sanctioned the constitution's approval with a 92% of "yes" votes. Such a referendum could hardly legitimate the regime, and gave little hope of progress towards a true national reconciliation.

== Constitutional process ==
The day after rising to power on December 2, 1990, Idriss Déby suspended the 1989 constitution. This was replaced on March 1, 1991, by a transitional national charter, after having been adopted on February 28 by the National Salvation Council, that it was announced would be replaced in 30 months by a new constitution drawn up by a Sovereign National Conference. The Charter, while if it gave vast if not exorbitant powers to the presidency, assured fundamental freedoms and rights, including the freedom of opinion and of association, the freedom of the press, the free movement of persons and property, the right to own property and the individual and collective freedoms in the frame of a pluralist democracy. The Charter also prohibited magistrates, men of the military and security services from being members of any party. The Charter also attempted to avoid a return of warlordism and sectarian politics, that had long plagued Chad: article 5 demanded parties "to shun intolerance, tribalism, regionalism, religious discrimination and xenophobia and incitement to hatred, and the resource [to] violence in all its forms", while article 6 forbade parties "to set up military or paramilitary organizations; to reconstitute into political parties any erstwhile politico-military bodies". To weaken tribalism, it was also added that to register, parties would need at least three members taken from each of ten prefectures. Despite this, the charter was widely seen of an attempt by a government only reluctantly committed to democracy to strictly remain in control of every part of the democratisation process.

In December 1991, with considerable delay and due to both serious armed challenges to Déby rule and French pressure, a 79-member commission was instituted to prepare the ground for the conference that, originally scheduled to be convened in May 1992, was on the occasion postponed. Following a month of discussions, the commission articulated a plan for the conference and its composition. Another commission followed in November 1992, known as the Tripartite Commission, composed of representatives of political parties, the government and civil society, under the chairmanship of the Interior Minister. The Commission appointed the 830 delegates to be represented at the CNS from a cross-section of Chad's society. The conference, which opened on January 15, 1993, obtained sovereign powers, and was encharged to prepare a draft of the constitution in one month.

The national conference, which remained in charge until April 6, when it selected in its place a Conseil Supérieur de Transition (CST), a 57-strong body transitional parliament, and a transitional government, both of which were designed to remain in charge for a year, i.e. until April 6, 1994, by which term elections were to take place and a definitive constitution be approved. In the meanwhile the conference adopted the National Charter as an interim constitution. As little had been achieved during the first year of transition, the term was later extended by the CST to April 9, 1995. This period was further extended by the CST on March 31, 1995, with the date for the approval by referendum of the constitution scheduled for March 31, 1996.

Finally, after more than three years of transition, the referendum was held as scheduled in 1996, proposing a draft modelled on the French constitution, promoting a presidential and unitary state. The proposed draft, mostly conceived among the presidential entourage and Déby's French allies, was approved by the 61.4% of the voters, but met with strong opposition in southern Chad: in four prefectures the constitution was rejected with over 80% of the votes, confirming the existence of deep divisions in Chad between the Muslim North and the Christian and animist South. Among the motivations adduced by the supporters of the "No" vote were that it did not create an independent judiciary, that it concentrated too much power in the presidency, and that it established Arabic as an official language.

== 1996 constitution ==
=== Preamble ===
The Constitution begins with a preamble, that severely criticizes the Chadian past, arguing that "years of dictatorship and single party rule have prevented the blossoming of any democratic culture and of multi-party politics", and has favoured the diffusion of "tribalism" and violations of human rights, thus generating "war, political violence, hatred, intolerance and suspicion between the different communities that make up the Chadian nation." To put an end to the "institutional and political crisis which has been shaking Chad for more than three decades", the preamble states that the Chadian people are committed "to build a state of law and a united nation founded on public liberties and fundamental human rights, dignity of the human person, and political pluralism, on the African values of solidarity and brotherhood", and also to seek to reach the goal of African unity. In the preamble the right of revolution is provided for: the individuals have not only the right, but also the duty to oppose "any state body that would assume power by force or would exercise it in violation of the present Constitution".

The constitution also vows to respect the human rights, defining the latter by its endorsement of the Charter of the United Nations, the African Charter on Human and Peoples' Rights and the Universal Declaration of Human Rights. The constitutional endorsement of the Universal Declaration of Human Rights is an aspect Chad has in common with many national constitutions: among African countries, it is endorsed by Benin, Burkina Faso, Burundi, Cameroon, Cape Verde, Comoros, Congo-Brazzaville, Côte d'Ivoire, Equatorial Guinea, Ethiopia, Gabon, Guinea, Guinea-Bissau, Mali, Mauritania, Niger, Rwanda, Senegal and Tanzania. A problem is represented by the implementation of the human rights norms, as there is a legal vacuum due to the lack of the necessary provisions in the Criminal Code, which has to be amended so that national legislation is put into line with the international human rights instruments.

=== Title one ===
The first section of the constitution covers in 11 articles the topics concerning the State and Sovereignty. The first article states that "Chad is a ... secular ... Republic", adding that "the separation between state and religion is affirmed", while in the second it is affirmed that the country is organized in "the Decentralised Territorial Collectivities, whose autonomy is guaranteed by the constitution". Sovereignty is placed in the hands of the people, who express it either through referendum or the election of representatives by universal suffrage. French and Arabic are designated the official languages. N'Djamena is made the national capital. The constitution also defines the national motto, flag, anthem.

=== Title two ===
The second part (12–58 articles) enumerates the rights and duties of the Chadian citizens. Men and women are equal before the law (article 13), and the state "has the duty to see to the elimination of all forms of discrimination with regard to women and to assure the protection of their rights in all areas of private and public life" (article 14). In the other articles, it is stated that the "human person is sacred and inviolable" (article 17), and that torture, slavery, arbitrary arrest and detention, collective penal responsibility are banned. Among Chadians' rights are those of opinion, circulation, press, strike, work, education, culture and to a healthy environment. "Private property is inviolable and sacred" (article 41), as is the domicile, and "the privacy of correspondence is guaranteed by law". The State and the Decentralised Territorial Collectivities are committed to the protection of the environment (article 48).

Among the citizens' duties, apart from the respect of the Constitution, stand "the defence of the fatherland" through mandatory military service (article 51), the respect of the environment and the participation to public expenses. Among the State's duties stand instead the respect of the government and armed forces' neutrality, as well as to exercise its "complete and permanent sovereignty over all national wealth and natural resources for the well-being of the whole national community" (article 57).

=== Title three ===
The third section of the constitution deals with the executive power (59 – 105 articles), which is exercised by the President and the Government. The President, who is Head of State and commander of the armed forces, is elected by popular vote for five years, and can be reelected only once. He must be Chadian by birth, and be "of high morality". It is up to the Constitutional Council to vigilate on the regularity of the elections. In case of vacancy or impeachment by the Supreme Court, presidential powers are exercised by the President of the Senate. The President nominates and replaces the Prime Minister, and, on the Prime Ministers advice, all the ministers. The President attends and chairs the cabinet's meetings. The President can oppose the National Assembly's deliberations, sending back to the Assembly an already approved law, but if it is again approved he must accept it. The president may appoint ambassadors, appoints civil and military personnel, dissolve the National Assembly, and declare a state of emergency for 15 days, that can be extended with the consent of the National Assembly.

The Government is instead headed by the Prime Minister, whose duty is to coordinate the government and provide for the administration of the country. Following his designation by the President, he must present himself before the Parliament to pass a motion of Confidence. He can replace the President in the Council of Ministers, but only on his former mandate. His acts, in the specific areas, must be signed also by the relevant minister.

=== Title four ===
The fourth part treats in detail the legislative power from article 106 to article 124. The legislative power is in the hands of the National Assembly and the Senate; while National Assembly representatives are directly elected by universal suffrage, those to the Senate represent the Decentralised Territorial Collectivities and are elected indirectly by a college composed regional, départemental and municipal councillors. While the firsts are elected for four years, the seconds are elected for six. Deputies and Senators enjoy parliamentary immunity from legal prosecution, except when the parliamentarian is caught in the act. A parliamentarian may be legally persecuted and even arrested by decision of his chamber of Parliament.

=== Title five ===
The fifth part (125 – 145 articles) deals about the relations among legislative and executive powers. It is stated that while making laws competes to Parliament, as does the declaration of war, the proclamation of the state of emergency expects to the President, and the Government can obtain from Parliament the authorization to promulgate ordinance in the domains generally competing to the legislative body. Legislative initiative competes to both the Government and the members of Parliament. Whenever a conflict emerges among the executive and legislative bodies over the conformity of a proposed amendment to the law in discussion, it's up to the Constitutional Council to decide for a side or the other.

=== Title six ===
This section takes in account the third power of the state, the judiciary (146 – 163 articles). Its autonomy from the legislative and executive is affirmed, and it is exercised by the Supreme Court, the Courts of Appeals, tribunals and Justices of the Peace. The highest jurisdiction is the Supreme Court, composed of 16 members. Of these, the President nominates the President of the court and 6 judges, 5 by the President of the National Assembly and the remaining 4 by the President of the Senate. The independence of the Judiciary is guaranteed by the President with the help of the Superior Council of Magistrates, that the President chairs. The Superior Council proposes nominations and advancements to the President, to whom it competes to place and remove them.

A space is also left to Customary and traditional law: it can be applied in locales where it is recognized and to the extent it does not interfere with public order or constitutional guarantees of equality for all citizens. Also traditional rules dictating matrimonial regimes and inheritances may be applied only with the consent of the parties concerned, or else by default the national law is used. This explicit constitutional reference to custom is in Francophone Africa a Chadian peculiarity, as the other Francophone appear to deny the existence of custom.

=== Title seven ===
The seventh part (164 – 175 articles) concerns the Constitutional Council, composed of 9 members serving terms of 9 years each, of whom a third are selected by the President of Chad, a third by the President of the National Assembly and the remaining third by the President of the Senate. Its office is to establish if laws and treaties are or are not in conformity with the constitution, and to monitor the regularity of referendums and legislative and presidential elections. It also intervenes to solve conflicts among a State's institutions.

=== Title eight ===
The eighth part (176 – 182 articles) also regards the judiciary power, this time dealing with the High Court of Justice, formed by 15 members, of whom 10 are parliamentarians and 5 Constitutional Council and Supreme Court judges. The only jurisdiction that can try the President and his Ministers in cases involving high treason (which includes in its definition human rights violations, embezzlement, corruption, extortion and traffic in drugs), the only crime for which a President can be judged while in his functions. To be brought before the tribunal, the President must first be impeached by a 2/3 vote of both chambers of Parliament.

=== Title nine ===
The ninth part (183 – 187 articles) treats the establishment of a High Council of Communication, composed of nine members chosen by the President (article 184). The council's duties are to monitor the respect for ethical rules in matters of information and communication, to guarantee the freedom of the press, and to assure political parties equal access to the public media (article 186).

=== Title ten ===
The tenth part (188 – 202 articles) regards internal security and the national defence, which are guaranteed by the security and armed forces (article 188). These forces are the Chadian National Army (ANT), the Gendarmerie, the National Police and the Nomad and National Guard (GNNT). The ANT and the Gendarmerie are employed in the national defence, while the GNNT, the Police and the Genarmerie guarantee public order. The security and armed forces are subordinated to civilian rule, and are kept to respect the republican legality (article 190).

=== Title eleven ===
The eleventh section (203 – 213 articles) regards the Decentralised Territorial Collectivities, represented by the Regions, Departments, Communes and Rural Communities of Chad (article 203). The DTC have economic and financial autonomy, and are run by elected local assemblies; among their offices stand the administration of the territory, the maintenance of public order and cultural, sanitary and economic development, along with the protection of the environment.

=== Title twelve ===
To the twelfth section (214 – 217 articles) concerns traditional and customary authorities, which are seen as guarantors of traditions and customs, and are collaborators of the local administrations.

=== Title thirteen ===
The arguments treated here concern cooperation, treaties and international agreements (218 – 222 articles). To the President competes negotiating and ratifying treaties, but the Parliament must provide its approval to the ratification of peace treaties, commercial treaties and those concerning the well-being of persons.

=== Title fourteen ===
This section concerns the revision of the constitution (223 – 226 articles). This competes to the President jointly with the Cabinet and the Parliament. To be taken in consideration, an amendment must be approved by both chambers of Parliament by a 2/3 majority of its members. Following the Parliament's vote, a referendum must ensue to make the revision valid. Parts of the constitution can't be revised: these concern the republican form of State, political pluralism, the fundamental human rights and the division among State and religion.

=== Title fifteen ===
In the last chapter the transitional dispositions (227 – 235 articles) are treated . These preview that the Constitution must be approved by referendum; that the current President, Idriss Déby, will remain in office until new elections; and that the Conseil Supérieur de Transition will remain for the meanwhile the country's legislative body. It is also added that before the Senate becomes operational, its powers will be held by the National Assembly. Regarding the highest judiciary bodies it states that, prior to their establishment, their functions will be exercised by the Court of Appeals of N'Djamena.

== 2005 constitutional revision ==
In November 2003, during the congress of the ruling Patriotic Salvation Movement (MPS), the party militants first voiced the idea of a revision of the Constitution. The proposal was promptly endorsed by the MPS-controlled National Assembly, that created a Parliamentary commission, which concluded that "after eight years since its existence to correct the faults of the constitution, the correction of the constitution has become inevitable and indispensable", proposing eight articles for constitutional review. These amendments were approved by the National Assembly on May 26, 2004, with 123 votes for, 1 abstention and no against. Due to its crushing majority in the chamber the MPS had no difficulties garnering the necessary 2/3 majority, while the opposition deputies walked out in sign of protest.

The amendments replaced the Senate with an Economic, Social, and Cultural Council appointed by the president, and made constitutional revisions a presidential prerogative, but the most controversial point results in the amendment of article 61, that stated that the President can be reelected to office only once. This ruled out the chance that President Idriss Déby could stand for reelection in the 2006 presidential elections, as he had already been reelected in 2001. Following the amendment, the two-term limit was removed, arousing fears that Déby was seeking to extend his rule indefinitely. The opposition came from both the smaller parties, that united in the Coordination des Parties Politiques de la Défence de la Constitution (CPDC), and important segments of the MPS and Déby's ethnic group, the Zaghawa. The reform of the constitution was also heavily criticized by international opinion and doubts were cast on the future of the democratisation process, in what was seen as an "authoritarian restoration".

As sanctioned by article 224, the constitutional modifications were to be submitted to referendum. Originally planned for late 2004, it was at the end held in June 2005. Amid allegations of widespread irregularities in the voter registration process and government repression of the independent media during the referendum campaign, the referendum passed with a 71% of "yes" votes, a result the opposition claimed was fixed in advance. The legal opposition presented itself divided at the referendum, with some parties campaigning for the "no" vote and others for boycott.
