= Ahmad Allam-Mi =

Chadian diplomat (born 1948)

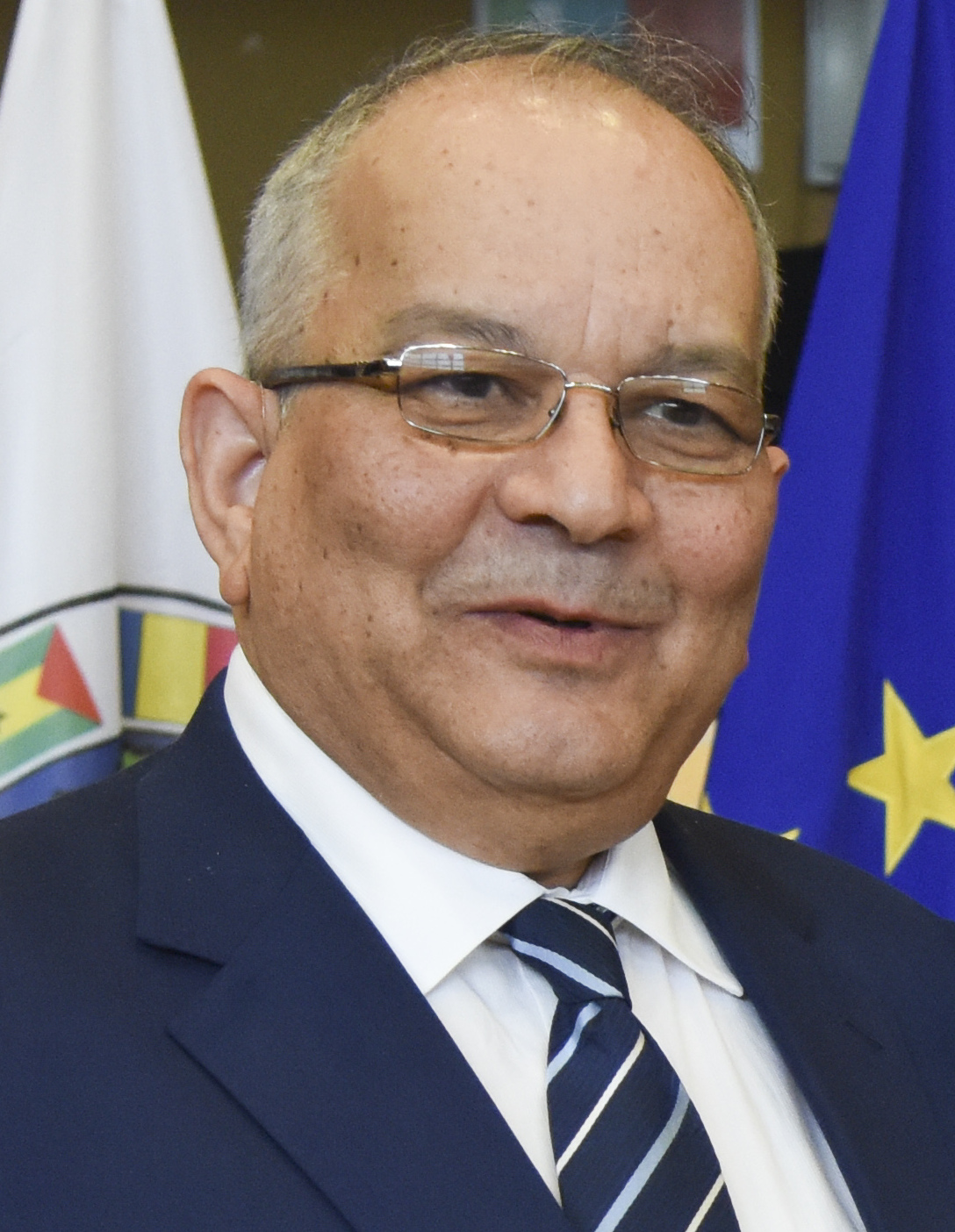
- Ahmed Allam-mi in 2015

Secretary-General of the Economic Community of Central African States
- Incumbent
- Assumed office 5 August 2013
- Preceded by: Nassour Guelendouksia Ouaido

Ahmad Allam-Mi (Arabic: أحمد علام مي; born 1948) is a Chadian diplomat who has been Secretary-General of the Economic Community of Central African States since 2013. He was the Foreign Minister of Chad from 2005 to 2008, and he was Chad's Permanent Representative to the United Nations from 2008 to 2013.

== Diplomatic career ==
Allam-Mi's first diplomatic post was as First Counsellor at the Chadian Embassy in Tripoli, Libya from 1975 to 1976. Subsequently he was the attaché of the Cabinet to the Ministry of Foreign Affairs before being posted to the Chadian Embassy in Paris as First Counsellor from 1978 to 1979 and then Chargé d'affaires at the same embassy from 1979 to 1980. He was then promoted to the position of Ambassador of Chad to France, Switzerland, Spain, and UNESCO, serving in that post during the 1980s; he was additionally accredited as Ambassador to Morocco and the Vatican City from 1983 to 1991. Back in Chad, he was briefly Adviser to the Presidency of the Republic in charge of International Relations before serving as Ambassador to France, Switzerland, Spain, and UNESCO for a second time from 1992 to 1994. He was Director-General of Foreign Affairs and Cooperation from 1997 to 2002, then Technical Adviser to the Presidency from 2002 to 2004 and Special Adviser to President Idriss Déby from 2004 to 2005.

When Prime Minister Pascal Yoadimnadji reshuffled the government on 7 August 2005, Allam-Mi was appointed as Minister of Foreign Affairs and African Integration.

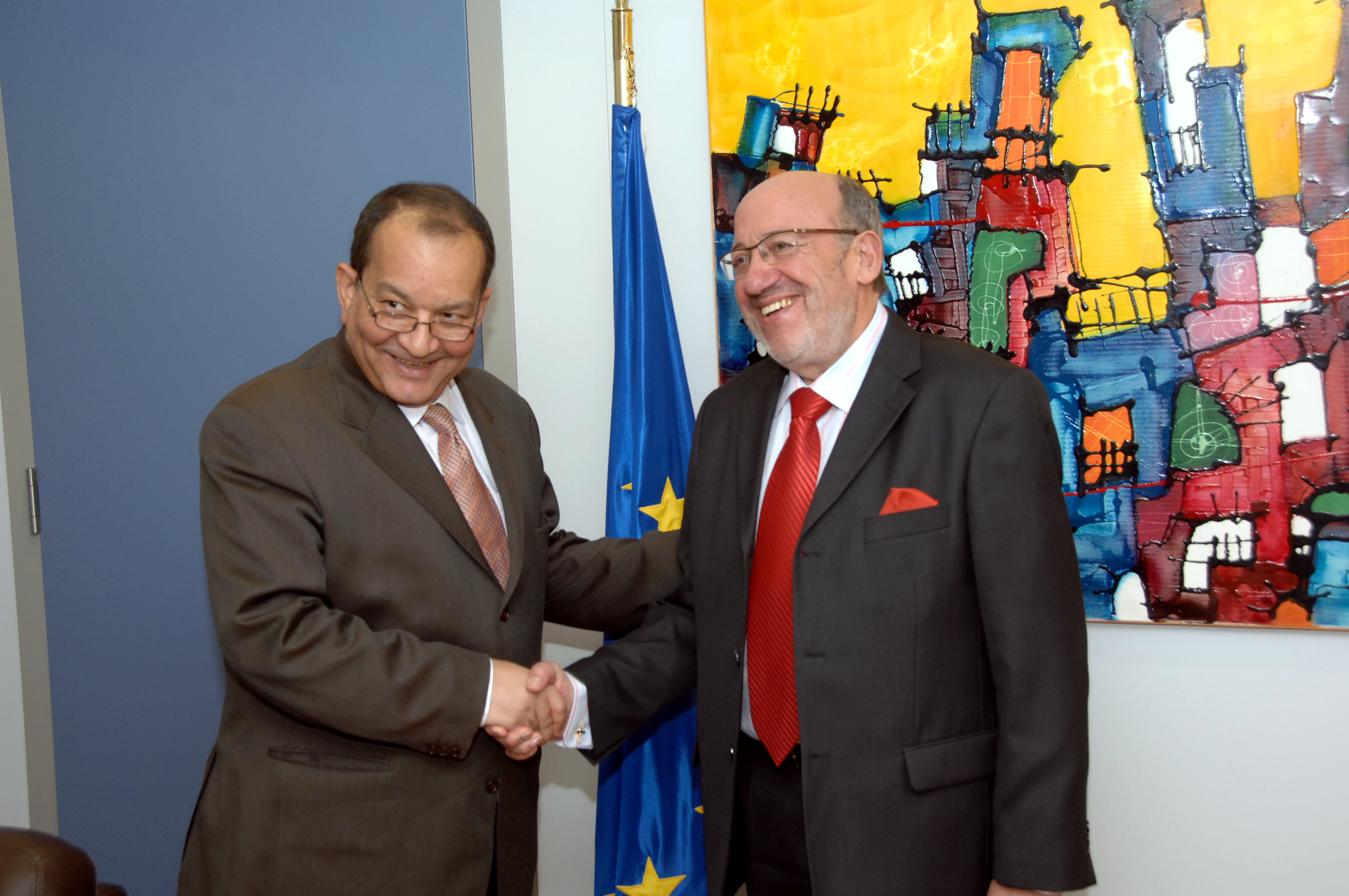
Ahmad Allam-Mi in 2008 as Minister of Foreign Affairs meeting European Commissioner Louis Michel

Allam-Mi told the United Nations General Assembly on 22 September 2006 that "the continuing armed conflict and humanitarian crisis engulfing Sudan's Darfur region threaten the security of the entire region." Allam-Mi said Chad has had to house over 300,000 refugees since the Darfur crisis began and at least 50,000 Chadians have been displaced and hundreds have died. Allam-Mi called on the United Nations to take over peacekeeping operations as approved in United Nations Security Council Resolution 1706, and that the deployment of peacekeepers would not violate Sudan's sovereignty.

On 6 August 2006, Allam-Mi attended the meeting in Beijing at which Chad and China formally re-established diplomatic ties. The two countries had initiated relations in 1972, but China broke them off in 1997 when Chad established ties with Taiwan.

In the government of Prime Minister Youssouf Saleh Abbas, which was announced on 23 April 2008, Allam-Mi lost his post as Minister of Foreign Affairs, being replaced by Moussa Faki. He was then appointed as Chad's Permanent Representative to the United Nations, presenting his credentials to UN Secretary-General Ban Ki-moon on 8 September 2008.

After five years at the UN, Déby appointed Allam-Mi to replace Nassour Guelendouksia Ouaido as Secretary-General of the Economic Community of Central African States on 29 July 2013. He took office on 5 August 2013.
