= Pahimi =

Pahimi is a Chadian surname. Notable people with the surname include:

- Albert Pahimi Padacké (born 1966), Chadian politician
- Kalzeubet Pahimi Deubet (born 1957), Chadian businessman and politician
