= Jean Alingué Bawoyeu =

Chadian politician

Prime Minister of Chad
- In office March 4, 1991 – May 20, 1992
- President: Idriss Déby
- Preceded by: vacant
- Succeeded by: Joseph Yodoyman

Personal details
- Born: August 18, 1937 (age 89) Fort-Lamy, French Equatorial Africa (present-day Chad)
- Party: Union for Democracy and Republic

Jean Alingué Bawoyeu (born August 18, 1937), known in French as the vieux sage, which translates as "wise elder", is a Chadian politician who was Prime Minister of Chad from 1991 to 1992. During the 1970s, he served successively as Ambassador to the United States and France. Later, he was President of the National Assembly in 1990. He served in the government as Minister of Justice from 2008 to 2010 and as Minister of Posts and New Information Technologies from 2010 to 2013.

A Christian, his base of support is in Tandjilé, in southern Chad, from which he originates.

== Early career ==
Alingué was born at Fort Lamy in 1937. A largely self-educated man, he started his career by entering the civil service in 1953, where he first served as a clerk in the capital's city treasury. Five years later he had risen to the position of city controller, and, with the independence of Chad from France, he attended the National Treasury School, in Paris between 1960 and 1961. On his return to Chad in 1961 he was made Treasury Inspector and Advisor to the Director of Public Accounts. Alingué kept these posts for three years, after which he was promoted, in 1966, to the rank of Treasurer General of Chad, where he remained for ten years. In 1974 he was assigned to the diplomatic service and sent to New York City as ambassador to the United Nations and the United States, and remained there until he was recalled in 1977. He was then Ambassador to France from 1977 to 1979.

Following the disintegration of all central authority after the first battle of N'Djamena in 1979, he became secretary-general of the Comité Permanente du Sud, the de facto government of southern Chad led by Wadel Abdelkader Kamougué. In 1982 Bawoyeu was briefly tapped by Goukouni Oueddei to be his minister of finance. In June 1983, after the Comité's fall in 1982, he formed, with other southerners who had held important posts under the governments of François Tombalbaye and Félix Malloum, an opposition party, the Groupe des patriotes et democrates tchadiens. On April 27, 1984, in Lagos, the group signed an accord with the Forces Populares et Revolutionnaires du Tchad, with the goal of forming a third force, opposed to both the Chadian government and the GUNT insurgents.

== President of the National Assembly and Prime Minister ==
Reconciled with the government, Alingué became president of the constitutional commission created by President Hissène Habré on July 8, 1988. The commission was charged with drafting a new constitution, which involved making a national inquiry that included missions and questionnaires. The new constitution was eventually approved by referendum on December 10, 1989. Under this constitution, a parliamentary election was held in July 1990, and Alingué was elected to the National Assembly. When the new National Assembly first met on August 5, 1990, it elected Alingué as President of the National Assembly.

When, on December 1, 1990, Habré and much of his government fled the capital before the advancing rebel forces of Idriss Déby, Alingué, as the highest ranking civilian authority left in N'Djamena, appealed for calm on the national radio and announced that he had assumed the lead of an interim government composed of fellow assemblymen and protected by the French troops stationed in the country. He also added that he had already started negotiations with General Déby and invited the government forces to depose their arms. Alingué refused on the occasion to assume the post of Head of State as he was entitled by the constitution in case of vacancy of the presidency, and instead was content to prepare for Déby's arrival. When later in his political career he was accused of having shown weakness and timidity in taking this course, he answered that if he had taken the office he would have plunged the country into a useless bloodbath.

Talks between Alingué and Déby on the passage of powers began the next day, when Déby's forces rolled into the capital. On December 6, Déby, as new leader of Chad, dissolved the National Assembly and formed a new interim government composed of a 33-member Council of State, which included Alingué among its members.

On March 4, 1991, Déby was proclaimed President of Chad and he proceeded to dissolve the Council of State the day after. In the new government Alingué was given the largely impotent office of Prime Minister, a post he held until May 20, 1992, when he was replaced by Joseph Yodoyman, like him a Chadian Southerner. This dismissal was felt by Alingué as an act of political ingratitude, transforming him through time into a staunch opponent of the president. During his period in office, in October 1991, the Council of Ministers adopted recommendations leading to the registration of political parties, thus putting an end to the single-party system.

== Birth of the UDR ==
While still Prime Minister, he founded one of the first new political parties, the Union for Democracy and Republic (UDR);, of which he was elected president in March 1992, prior to the party's official recognition. the organization was readily considered among Chad's most prominent political parties. Alingué united his party with a study group created in April 1991 in Moyen-Chari by a number of young local cadres and intellectuals, among whom was Koibla Djimasta, who became Prime Minister in 1995. This alliance made the UDR a conglomerate of political fiefs, uniting Alingué's personal Tandjilé base with his allies following in Moyen-Chari. This alliance began breaking up in 1996 on the issue of the approval or not of the proposed constitution. In the ensuing referendum, Djimasta campaigned actively in his region for the "yes", while Alingué became a leading spokesman for the "no" front. Alingué had previously favored a "yes" vote, but apparently was later forced to side with the "no" vote by his party that put him in minority in March 1996. This defection was later followed by that of another key Moyen-Chari UDR politician, Abdoulaye Djonouma, marking the breakup of the Moyen-Chari-Tandjilé coalition and reducing Alingué's UDR to a mere regional party.

Before the referendum, Alingué had played a significant role during the convening of the National Sovereign Conference (CNS) in 1993. He acted there as a spokesman for the members representing the political parties, presiding over the conclusive rounds of talks that beginning on March 7 were to define the last issues on the tables. In particular, he played an important role in putting an end to the serious deadlock that emerged regarding the composition and the size of the transitional legislature that was to remain in office until elections were held. After many fruitless votes, Alingué, speaking for the political parties, imposed a compromise proposal, on which no negotiation or debate was accepted.

== Elections ==
Under the UDR's banner Alingué presented himself on June 2, 1996, as a candidate for the country's first competitive presidential election since independence, coming fourth with 8.31% of the vote. Alingué, together with the other 14 opposition candidates, attempted to have the first round of the elections annulled for alleged massive frauds and falsifications favouring President Déby, but their joint petition to the Court of Appeal was rejected on June 19; Alingué then, with other candidates, invited the electors to boycott the second round.

His party, the UDR, took part in the 1997 parliamentary election, obtaining four seats. He showed himself, in 1998, to be a staunch advocate for the disengagement of Chadian troops from the Congo War, arguing that, since there was no defensive accord between Chad and Congo-Kinshasa, there was no legal basis for the presence of Chadian troops in Congo.

He participated in the presidential election held on May 20, 2001, but finished last, receiving only 2.05%, losing 26% in his Tandjilé stronghold and 14% in N'Djamena compared with 1996. With all the opposition candidates he denounced the elections, asking for a rerun. His party, the UDR, boycotted the 2002 parliamentary election, and did the same for the 2005 constitutional referendum. When the results of the latter were published, declared that the results were fixed and accused Déby of attempting to set up a political dynasty. On March 26, 2005, the Public Security and Immigration Minister Abderahmane Moussa withdrew Alingué's passport, claiming that it was not valid, and thus prevented him from leaving Chad to participate in an important gathering of the main opposition leaders in Paris on March 27, 2005. Opposition newspapers argued that the passport was valid, reporting a statement by Alingué, who said that he had travelled with the same passport since 2002 without anybody questioning its validity.

In the government of Prime Minister Youssouf Saleh Abbas, which was announced on April 23, 2008, Alingué was appointed as Minister of Justice. He was one of four members of the Coordination of Political Parties for Defense of the Constitution opposition coalition to be included in the government. He was instead appointed as Minister of Posts and New Information Technologies in 2010, serving in that post until he was dismissed from the government in January 2013.

Political offices
Preceded by Position Vacant	Prime Minister of Chad; March 4, 1991 – May 20, 1992	Succeeded by Joseph Yodoyman
