= Mahmoud Ali Seid =

Chadian public administrator and politician

Minister of Youth, Sports and Promotion of Entrepreneurship
- Incumbent
- Assumed office February 25, 2022
- President: Mahamat Idriss Déby
- Prime Minister: Albert Pahimi Padacké
- Preceded by: Routouang Mohamed Ndonga Christian

Personal details
- Born: Mahmoud Ali Seid; 5 April 1986 (age 40) Chad
- Education: Jean Moulin University Lyon 3
- Profession: Teacher

Mahmoud Ali Seid, born on April 5, 1986, in Chad, is a Chadian public administrator and politician.

A member of the Patriotic Salvation Movement, the former ruling party, he was appointed Minister of Youth, Sports, and Promotion of Entrepreneurship in February 25, 2022. He had previously held high-ranking positions within the public administration of his country for ten years.

== Biography ==
Mahmoud Ali Seid was born and raised in Chad. He completed his secondary education at Thilam Thilam High School in N'Djamena. He then pursued higher education in Management with a focus on Finance in Algeria, where he obtained his master's degree. He later earned a Ph.D. in Management Science from Jean Moulin University Lyon 3 and in Business Science in Luxembourg. Upon returning to Chad, Mahmoud Ali Seid served as a teacher in several faculties across the country. He was also the administrator of the microfinance project in Chad and the chief accountant of the CPA, and general coordinator of the contact group for peace research in Chad.

== Political career ==
Upon his return to N'Djamena, Chad, Mahmoud Ali Seid became a staunch defender of the ruling party, promoting the slogan "peace in Chad." His notable actions caught the attention of the authorities, leading to several key appointments. He was successively appointed as Director of Administrative, Financial, and Material Affairs of the Presidency of the Republic, General Controller of Police, Deputy Director General of the Central Pharmaceutical Purchasing Agency of Chad, Director of Human Resources at the Ministry of Public Health, deputy director of Communication and Strategies at the Ministry of Finance. On Friday, February 25, 2022, he entered the government as Minister of Youth, Sports, and Promotion of Entrepreneurship. He is also the president of the Coalition of Civil Society Associations for Citizen Action (CASAC).

== Controversies ==
In 2020, during the second inclusive national forum, he proposed the revocation of Chadian nationality for anyone who attacks the personality of the president. This proposal created significant controversy in Chadian public opinion.
