= Nassour Guelendouksia Ouaido =

Chadian politician

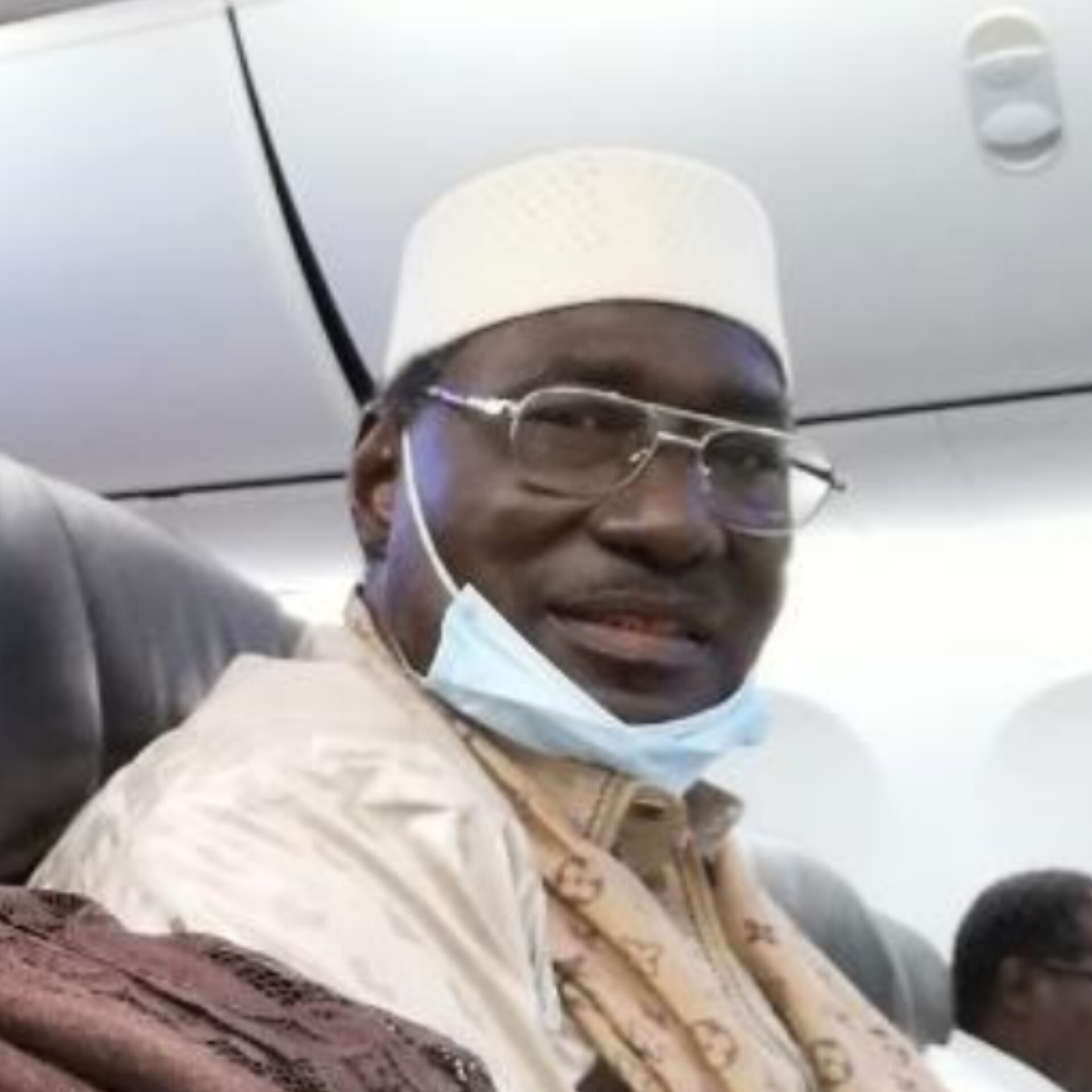

Prime Minister of Chad
- In office May 17, 1997 – December 13, 1999
- President: Idriss Deby
- Preceded by: Koibla Djimasta
- Succeeded by: Nagoum Yamassoum

Personal details
- Born: 1947 (age 78–79) Gounou Gaya, Chad, French Equatorial Africa

Nassour Guelendouksia Ouaido (born 1947) is a Chadian politician who was Prime Minister of Chad from 1997 to 1999 and was President of the National Assembly of Chad from 2002 to 2011. He was Secretary-General of the Economic Community of Central African States from 2012 to 2013.

== Career ==
A southerner, he was born in 1947 at Gounou Gaya.

A demographer specialising in Sub-Saharan Africa, he started his studies in N'Djamena, where he obtained his baccalauréat, and after that took a diplôme d'Ingénieur at Abidjan's School of Statistics. He later completed his education by receiving a diploma at Yaoundé and, lastly, at the Paris Demography Institute. Ouaido began his working career as co-director of the projected 1974-75 Chadian national census. He successively worked at the Permanent Interstate Committee for drought control in the Sahel, becoming in 1988 the interim director of one of its structures, the Centre d'Etudes et de Recherche sur la Population pour le Développement.

Since 1995 Ouaido has been in politics under the banner of President Idriss Déby's party, the Patriotic Salvation Movement (MPS), serving as Minister of Education and Minister of Planning and Cooperation. He was Secretary-General at the President's Office when, following the resignation of Koibla Djimasta's cabinet, he was appointed by the President on May 17, 1997 as the new Prime Minister. This change originated from the rallying to the government of the opposition leader Wadel Abdelkader Kamougué, who was thus elected President of the National Assembly with the support of the MPS on May 9. Ouaido's new cabinet included representatives of several parties, even if the key posts were kept by the MPS; it was appointed on May 21.

Ouaido was eventually replaced two years later, on December 13, 1999, and succeeded by Nagoum Yamassoum, also of the ruling party and considered a close aide of Déby. It is believed that Ouaido's expected removal was motivated by two main reasons: the failure to quell the insurgency led by the former Minister of Interior Youssouf Togoïmi and the difficulties with the Doba oilfield project, abandoned by the oil companies Elf Aquitaine and Royal Dutch Shell. Another element was the fall of cotton prices, which affected the country's first source of exports and thus increased the deficit.

In the April 2002 parliamentary election, Ouaido was elected to the National Assembly as an MPS candidate from Gounou Gaya constituency in Kabia Department. When the new National Assembly first met on June 10, 2002, he was elected as the President of the National Assembly.

On February 29, 2008, Ouaido was appointed by Déby to head an international commission of inquiry into the disappearances of opposition leaders who were allegedly arrested by the government earlier in the month. However, there were concerns from the opposition and non-governmental organizations that this commission would not act independently, and it was subsequently replaced by another commission, which was viewed more favorably and was not headed by Ouaido, on April 2.

Ouaido was subsequently designated as Secretary-General of the Economic Community of Central African States, taking office on 28 February 2012. He was succeeded in that post by Ahmad Allam-Mi on 5 August 2013.

Political offices
Preceded by Koibla Djimasta	Prime Minister of Chad; May 17, 1997 – December 13, 1999	Succeeded by Nagoum Yamassoum
