= National Union for Independence and Revolution =

Ruling party in Chad (1984–1990)

National Union for Independence and Revolution Union nationale pour l'indépendance et la révolution
- Leader: Hissène Habré
- Founded: 24 June 1984
- Dissolved: 1 December 1990
- Merger of: FROLINAT, FAN and GUNT
- Preceded by: FAN (Armed group)
- Headquarters: N'Djamena
- Ideology: Nationalism; Authoritarianism; Conservatism; Anti-communism; Market economy; Faction: Islamic socialism; Revolutionary nationalism
- Political position: Right-wing to far-right
- Religion: Islam

The National Union for Independence and Revolution (French: Union nationale pour l'indépendance et la révolution, UNIR) was the ruling party of Chad from 1984 to 1990. It was founded in June 1984 by President Hissène Habré as a successor to his Armed Forces of the North, the insurgent group, which Habré used to seize power in 1982. The party was banned following the 1990 coup d'état led by Idriss Déby.

== Background ==
In 1965, five years after Chad gained its independence, the country erupted into civil war. The conflict represented a rekindling of traditional animosities between the Muslims of the northern and central regions and the predominantly non-Muslim people of the south who had dominated the government and civil service since independence. A turning point in the conflict was represented by the conquest in 1979 of the capital, N'Djamena, by northern insurgents; although the struggle continued with increasing severity, its shape had been changed by the conquest, ultimately developing into a conflict between the two main northern leaders, Hissène Habré, leader of the Armed Forces of the North (FAN), and Goukouni Oueddei, leader of the People's Armed Forces (FAP).

After the fall of N'Djamena, the rival factions signed an accord in Lagos which created the Transitional Government of National Unity (GUNT), with Oueddei as President and Habré as Defence Minister, the accord broke down in 1980 with the Second Battle of N'Djamena, at which point, Habré rebelled and was expelled from the GUNT. While defeated in 1980 due to Libyan intervention, he was able to secure control of the capital and expel the GUNT two years later on 7 June 1982.

On assuming power, Habré issued on 29 September a constitution which put at the center the FAN's executive body, the Command Council, which became the country's ultimate fount of power and was entitled to appoint and also call to account the President.

== Foundation of the UNIR ==
Habré's political support came primarily from northerners, the army that brought him to power, and civilians who supported his opposition to Libyan interference in Chadian affairs. To broaden his support, in 1984, he undertook a program to extend the reach of the government into rural areas, first by seeking the advice of the nation's prefects. Southern prefects advised that in addition to lingering animosity based on the early association of FAN with FROLINAT, which had worked to oust the southern-based government of François Tombalbaye, a major concern in that region was the conduct of the army. The army had become, in effect, an obstacle to security.

Following this, Habré delivered a speech on 7 June during the celebrations marking the second anniversary of his rise to power. In his address, he announced that the FAN, following the dissolution of the old FAN militia within the newly formed Chadian National Armed Forces, was to be considered dissolved and should evolve into something new. He also added that an extraordinary congress of the FAN was to be called in a short time. The first congress of the FROLINAT-FAN was opened on 20 June, opened by a speech of the President in which he attacked Libyan presence in northern Chad as an attempt to "wipe out our traditional and ancestral values". Two days later, on 22 June, the Congress announced the formal dissolution of the FAN, which was replaced on 24 June by the National Union for Independence and Revolution, a movement whose aims were declared to be the establishment of democratic political life, freedom of expression and opposition to "religious fanaticism".

The congress was closed on 27 June by Habré, who, in his closing speech, announced the merger into the new movement of three political parties already allied with the government. These parties represented:

- The Minister of Health, Abba Siddick's Frolinat Originel;
- Delwa Kassiré Koumakoye's National Rally for Development and Progress; and
- The Minister of State, Djidingar Dono Ngardoum's Assembly for Unity and Chadian Democracy.

The latter two represented southern elite parties, and their assimilation was pivotal in guaranteeing the formation of a state party through which the entire political elite of the country would be represented in the government and the National Consultative Council.

The creation of the UNIR did not take place without opposition. The GUNT counter-government argued that Habré lacked the authority to dissolve FROLINAT, as the FAN was merely a dissident faction that had been expelled from the main group. Goukouni, the GUNT's chairman, added that with UNIR's formation, Habré "had cleared yet another obstacle in his betrayal of the Chadian revolution."

Strong opposition also emerged among many delegates, sparking heated debates—particularly over the abandonment of the FAN name, to which many militants remained deeply attached. According to Robert Buijtenhuijs, the congress had been delayed primarily due to Habré's fear of being outvoted by the FAN's old guard, forcing him to assert his authority forcefully to secure obedience from his former comrades.

== Organization ==
On 26 June, the day before the congress concluded, the delegates acclaimed President Hissène Habré as chairman of the movement and, acting on his proposals, formed an 80-member Central Committee. Of the 43 members who had composed the FAN's Command Council, only 18 were retained in the new Central Committee.

As part of an effort to break free from the political "northern ghetto" in which Habré had been confined and to establish a fairer regional balance, 25 of the 80 appointees were southerners.

The day after the congress closed (28 June), the Central Committee convened for the first time and appointed the members of the 15-member Executive Bureau. Chaired by the President, this body was designed to serve as the primary link between the party and the government. As with the Central Committee, members were selected based on the President’s recommendations.

Of the 15 appointees:

- 9 were military officers;
- 6 were southerners (including Executive Secretary Gouara Lassou), while the rest were northerners.

In terms of regional representation:

- Habré’s native region, BET, had the strongest presence with 4 members;
- Moyen-Chari followed with 3 representatives.

== Electoral history ==
=== Presidential elections ===
Election	Candidate	Votes	%	Result
1989 (referendum)	Hissène Habré	2,687,352	99.94%	Elected ✓

=== National Assembly elections ===
Election	Leader	Votes	%	Seats	+/–	Position	Result
1990	Hissène Habré			123 / 123 (Note: The country was a one party state as a result of the 1989 referendum but all candidates stood for the election as independents.)	New	1st	Sole legal party
