= Hissène =

Hissène or Hissene can be both a masculine given name and a surname. Notable people with this name include:

- Hissène Habré (1942–2021), Chadian politician and war criminal
- Abdoulaye Hissène (born 1967), Central African warlord
- Mahamat Hissene (died 2021), Chadian politician

== See also ==
- Hussein
