= 1989 Chadian constitutional referendum =

A constitutional referendum was held in Chad on 10 December 1989. The new constitution made the country a one-party state with the National Union for Independence and Revolution as the sole legal party, as well as confirming Hissène Habré, who had come to power in a 1982 coup, as president. It also provided for a presidential republic with a unicameral National Assembly. It was passed by 99.9% of voters, with a turnout of 93%.

== Background ==
Chad had endured a mostly unstable government since its independence in 1960 into the 1980s, including prolonged periods of civil war. In 1982, Hissène Habré gained control of the government and instituted a somewhat stable but authoritarian dictatorship, backed by the United States and France. Beginning in 1988, Habré began to allow slivers of democracy into the government, with regional congresses and a constitutional committee being held.

The constitution created a single-party state under Habré's National Union for Independence and Revolution party. The proposed constitution created the National Assembly, though it gave the Assembly no meaningful authority. Elections were held in 1990 to fill the new Assembly. The referendum also counted as a presidential election, and Habré was elected to a seven-year term.

The constitution of 1989 would be short-lived, however. In December 1990, six months after the election, the Patriotic Salvation Movement (MPS) under Idriss Déby would successfully overthrow Habré's government. The MPS suspended the constitution and Assembly upon gaining power, promising an eventual multiparty democracy. After a slow democratization process, a new constitution was finally approved by a referendum in 1996.

== Results ==
Choice	Votes	%
For	2,687,352	99.94
Against	1,485	0.06
Total	2,688,837	100.00
Valid votes	2,688,837	99.89
Invalid/blank votes	2,997	0.11
Total votes	2,691,834	100.00
Registered voters/turnout	2,894,825	92.99

Official results gave a total number of valid votes as 2,690,285, 1,448 more than the total of for and against votes.
