= Ali Kolotou Tchaïmi =

Chadian politician (born 1972)

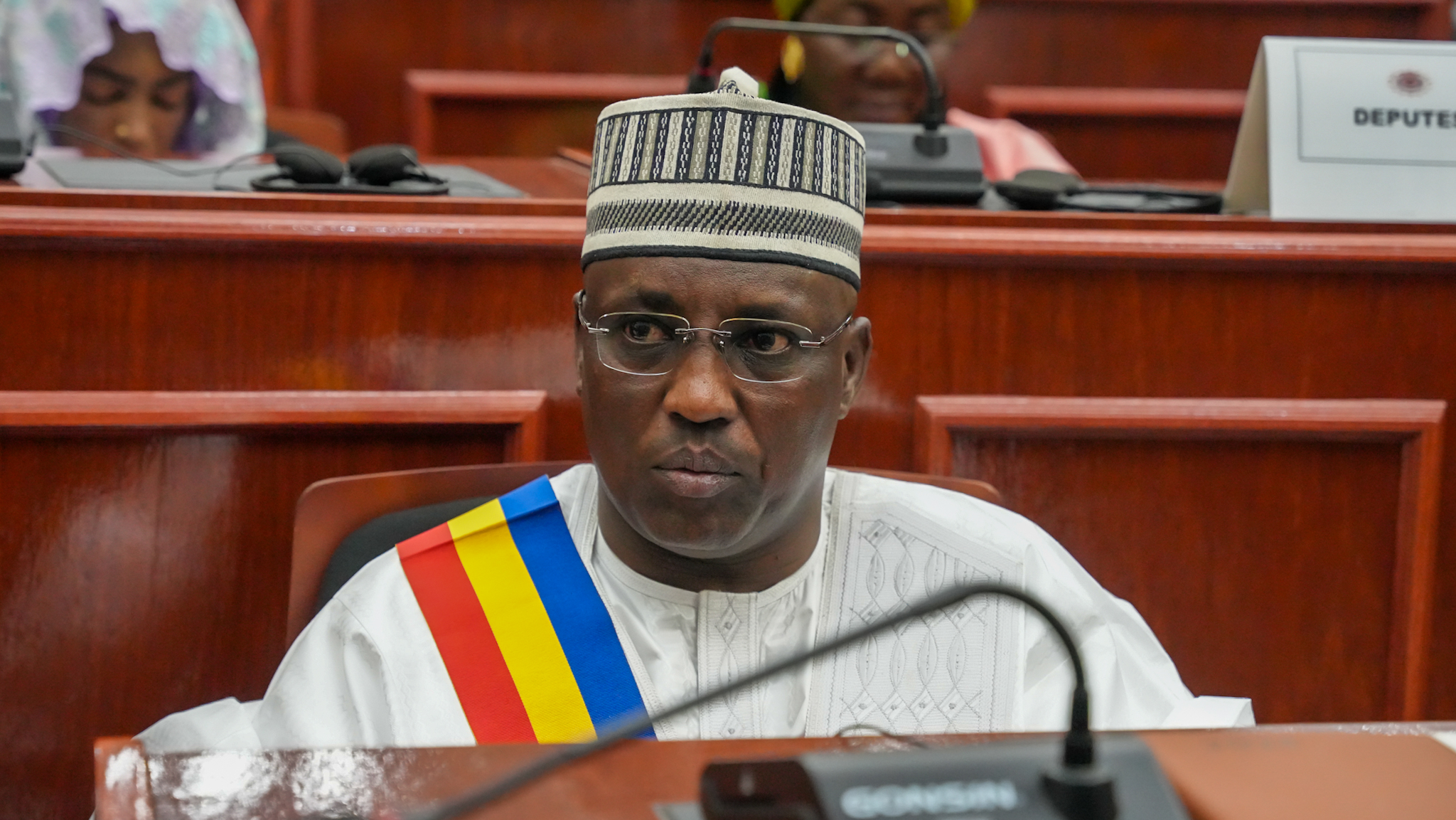

President of the National Assembly of Chad
- Incumbent
- Assumed office 4 February 2025
- Preceded by: Haroun Kabadi (as President of Transitional National Council)

Personal details
- Born: 1 January 1972 (age 53) Salal, Chad
- Political party: MPS
- Profession: Politician

Ali Kolotou Tchaïmi (born 1 January 1972) is a Chadian politician serving as the current President of the National Assembly since February 2025. He is a member of the Patriotic Salvation Movement (MPS).

== Biography ==
Tchaïmi was born on 1 January 1972 in Salal, Chad. He is a graduate of the École nationale d’administration et de magistrature (ENAM, National School of Administration and Magistracy). He later received a higher diploma from the Militaire du Groupement des Écoles Militaires Interarmées (GEMIA, Group of Joint Military Schools) in Chad, as well as a master's degree in public administration from the Centre d'Etudes Diplomatiques et Stratégiques (CEDS, Center for Diplomatic and Strategic Studies) in Paris, France.

Tchaïmi became a member of the Patriotic Salvation Movement (MPS) upon its founding in 1990. He led the administration of Michemiré from 1995 to 1996, then was sub-prefect of Moïto from 1997 to 2003. He was a member of the MPS political bureau, serving as the National Secretary of Nomadic Affairs as well as National Secretary of Defense and Security. He also was an advisor to president Idriss Déby from 2008 to 2011. Tchaïmi was a coordinator for the party during the 2006, 2011 and 2021 presidential elections, also serving as a leading member of Mahamat Déby's campaign team during the 2024 presidential election.

In 2011, Tchaïmi was elected a member of the National Assembly of Chad. He served as president of the autonomous budget control committee in the legislature. He remained a member of the parliament until its dissolution in 2021, afterwards becoming a member of the National Transitional Council. He served as spokesperson for the chairs of parliamentary groups and became the first vice president of the National Transitional Council in May 2024. After the National Assembly was reestablished in 2025, Tchaïmi won election to it. On 4 February 2025, Tchaïmi was unanimously chosen by the 188 deputies to be the new President of the National Assembly of Chad.

Tchaïmi is married and has several children. He lives in N'Djamena. He is a Grand Officer of the National Order of Chad and a recipient of the Military Merit Medal of the Chadian Nation with a gold palm. Outside of politics, he has served as president of the Association Tchadienne pour l'Assistance aux Enfants de la Rue, Malnutris, Orphelins et Réfugiés (ASTAERMOR, Chadian Association for Assistance to Street Children, Malnourished Children, Orphans, and Refugees), and honorary president of the Association Tchadienne d’Intelligence Économique (ATIE, Chadian Association for Economic Intelligence).
