= Joseph Yodoyman =

Chadian politician and civil servant (1950-1993)

Joseph Yodoyman (1950 – November 22, 1993) was a Chadian politician and civil servant, who held the post of Prime Minister under President Idriss Déby from 1992 to 1993.

Originally from southern Chad, he graduated at the Institut international de l'administration publique (IIAP) of Paris. In Chad he became Civil Service Director, until the collapse of all central authority in 1979. In the same year he was made member of the newly formed Comité Permanente du Sud, the de facto government of Southern Chad. He eventually left the post when he entered in November in the Transitional Government of National Unity (GUNT) as deputy secretary-general. In July 1981 he was promoted, becoming the GUNT's secretary of state for Interior.

When Hissène Habré formed his first cabinet on October 21, 1982, after having overthrown the GUNT, Yodoyman remained in the cabinet as Minister of Planning. In March 1984 Habré entrusted him with an important mission to Brazzaville and Paris, meant to sound the Southern opposition leaders and verify the possibilities of reaching an accord with them.

After the fall of Habré, President Idriss Déby selected Yodoyman as his second Prime Minister on May 20, 1992, replacing Jean Alingué Bawoyeu. In July Yodoyman was expelled from his party, the National Alliance for Democracy and Development (ANDD), which accused him of an "authoritarian, even totalitarian, drift". Yodoyman rebutted that he refused to be "the hostage of any party". and founded a new party, the National Alliance for Democracy and Renewal (in French Alliance Nationale pour la Démocratie et le Renouveau). He remained in office until April 7, 1993, when Fidèle Moungar, who had been elected by the National Conference, took his place. He died a few months later, on November 22.

Political offices
Preceded by Jean Alingué Bawoyeu	Prime Minister of Chad; May 20, 1992 – April 7, 1993	Succeeded by Fidèle Moungar
