= 1996 Chadian constitutional referendum =

- 31 March 1996

Results
Choice	Votes	%
Yes	1,201,782	63.18%
No	700,362	36.82%
Valid votes	1,902,144	95.55%
Invalid or blank votes	88,525	4.45%
Total votes	1,990,669	100.00%
Registered voters/turnout	3,260,782	61.05%

A constitutional referendum was held in Chad on 31 March 1996 to approve or reject the new constitutional draft meant to definitively replace the Transitional Charter established by the Sovereign National Conference in 1993. It was approved by 63% of voters with a 61% turnout.

== Background ==
President Idriss Déby had promised since his rise to power in 1990 to introduce multiparty democracy. Despite these promises, Déby slowed the process in an attempt to maintain full control over the transition. This worried France, Chad's former colonial power, as it noted that by 1995 only Chad had yet to hold multi-party elections. With the French putting pressure on Déby, on 6 January 1996 he was forced into round table talks with the 15 armed groups and 58 opposition parties in Franceville, Gabon.

The conference was a failure, as it soon foundered on procedural points and questions of representation, and, at a deeper level, due to the deep mistrust between northern and southern Chadians. Déby used it to divide the opposition, allying himself with groups willing to put an end to armed confrontation with the government.

On 6 March Déby used a presidential decree to announce that the referendum would take place on 31 March. Despite a certain degree of administrative confusion, the referendum was carried out successfully with the assistance of the French garrison present in the country.

== Conduct ==
In its report on the presidential elections, the Agency for Cultural and Technical Co-operation of the Francophonie criticised the referendum's conduct. The criticism centered on four points, concerning the inadequacy of the personnel in charge of polling stations and the local electoral commissions, the absence of neutrality in the recruitment of election personnel, scarce respect for the electoral code during vote counting and the uneven distribution of the referendum material.

During the referendum campaign the local authorities arrested the leader of the Chadian League of the Rights of Man (LTDH) in Bongor, after he had asked a village headman to follow the indications of the Independent National Electoral Commission (CENI), which prohibited campaigning on voting day.

== Results ==
On 8 April CENI published provisional results of the referendum, which saw a victory for the "yes" camp with 61.46% of the vote. The "no" camp took 38.54% of the vote, obtaining a clear majority in four of the 18 prefectures, all in southern Chad. The results were revised by the N'Djamena Court of Appeals, which had temporarily replaced the Constitutional Council and the Supreme Court as the highest jurisdiction in Chad, as the latter were to be instituted. The court rejected a number of ballots for technical reasons, raising the "yes" percentage to 63.5%, The result was officially validated and made public on 13 April. The Court also immediately proceeded to proclaim the draft constitution as the new supreme law of the State, and the following day, President Idriss Déby promulgated the new constitution.

Choice	Votes	%
For	1,201,782	63.18
Against	700,362	36.82
Total	1,902,144	100.00
Valid votes	1,902,144	95.55
Invalid/blank votes	88,525	4.45
Total votes	1,990,669	100.00
Registered voters/turnout	3,260,782	61.05
Source: African Elections Database
