= Koibla Djimasta =

Prime Minister of Chad
- In office April 8, 1995 – May 17, 1997
- President: Idriss Déby
- Preceded by: Delwa Kassiré Koumakoye
- Succeeded by: Nassour Guelendouksia Ouaido

Personal details
- Born: 1950 French Equatorial Africa (present-day Chari-Baguirmi Prefecture, Chad)
- Died: January 30, 2007 (aged 56–57)
- Party: Union for Democracy and Republic

Koibla Djimasta (1950 – January 30, 2007) was a Chadian politician of Sara ethnicity from the southern Chari-Baguirmi Prefecture.

An administrator, Djimasta held various cabinet positions under Presidents Hissène Habré and Idriss Déby, beginning with his appointment as Minister of Health and Social Affairs in the cabinet created by Habré on October 21, 1982, shortly after his rise to power. After the rise of Déby to power and the legalization of opposition political parties, he became a member of the Union for Democracy and the Republic, founded in 1992, and was a leading figure in the party, together with Jean Alingué Bawoyeu.

A shrewd politician, Djimasta was appointed as Minister of the Interior on May 22, 1992, serving in that position until 1993. He headed a commission, composed of representatives of the government, political parties, and civil society, that was responsible for preparing for the Sovereign National Conference; the commission was created by President Déby in November 1992, and its task included the selection of the Conference's delegates. Djimasta was nominated as transitional Prime Minister by Déby on April 8, 1995 and confirmed by the transitional parliament by winning a majority vote of 54 to 36. Déby had become wary of Prime Minister Delwa Kassiré Koumakoye due to the latter's evident presidential ambitions, moving him to search a more malleable Prime Minister, as Djimasta was effectively to prove himself.

On August 11, 1996 a new 21-member cabinet was formed, in which he retained the post of Prime Minister. A year later he resigned and on May 17, 1997 his place was taken by Nassour Guelendouksia Ouaido. He was instead assigned the post of National Mediator (ombudsman) in 1997, and he held this post until his death in 2007.

Political offices
Preceded by Delwa Kassiré Koumakoye	Prime Minister of Chad; April 8, 1995 – May 17, 1997	Succeeded by Nassour Guelendouksia Ouaido
