= List of presidents of the National Assembly of Chad =

This article lists the presidents of the National Assembly Chad, from the establishment of the National Assembly of Chad in 1959 to the present day.

== List of officeholders ==
=== Legislative speakers (1959–1993) ===
Name	Took office	Left office
Allahou TahIr	1959	1960
Ahmat Kotoko	1960	1961
Mahamat Abdelkerim	1962	1963
Adoum Tchéré	1961	1969
Abbo Nassour	1969	April 1975
Nadji Mbaisde Abdou	1982	1990
Jean Alingué Bawoyeu	October 1990	6 December 1990
Ousman Gam	1991	1992
Bada Abbas Maldoum	1992	1993

=== Presidents of Conseil Supérieur de Transition (CST, 1993–1997) ===
Name	Took office	Left office
Lol Mahamat Choua	April 1993	15 October 1994
Mahamat B. Gadaya	15 October 1994	1995
Issa Abbas Ali	1995	1997

=== Presidents of the National Assembly of Chad (1997–2021) ===
Name	Took office	Left office
Wadel Abdelkader Kamougué	9 May 1997	2002
Nassour Guelendouksia Ouaido	10 June 2002	23 June 2011
Haroun Kabadi	23 June 2011	20 April 2021

=== Presidents of Transitional National Council ===
Name	Took office	Left office
Haroun Kabadi	5 October 2021	4 February 2025

=== Presidents of the National Assembly of Chad (2025–) ===
Name	Took office	Left office
Ali Kolotou Tchaïmi	4 February 2025	Incumbent
