= Adoum Younousmi =

Chadian politician (born 1962)

Adoum Younousmi (Arabic: أدوم يونوسمي; born 1962) is a Chadian politician who served in the government of Chad as Minister of Public Works and Transport from 2003 to 2005 and as Minister of State for Infrastructure from 2005 to 2011. He was briefly Prime Minister in an acting capacity for a few days in February 2007.

== Biography ==
Younousmi was born in Fada, Chad, and is an engineer by training; he graduated from the National School of Engineering in Bamako, Mali. From 2000 to 2003, he was a representative of the Agency for the Safety of Air Navigation (ASECNA) in Chad. He also assumed the chief responsibility subdivision of Civil Engineering Infrastructure service, part of the ASECNA. He was seen as a rising star and was close to President Idriss Deby.

He became Minister of Public Works and Transport in June 2003 before being appointed Minister of State for Infrastructure in the government named on 7 August 2005. Younousmi became powerful due to an increase in oil revenues and Chad's involvement in major infrastructure projects. He was criticized for promoting new infrastructure with unrealistic deadlines and overcharging by contractors.

When Prime Minister Pascal Yoadimnadji was flown to France for medical treatment on 21 February 2007, Younousmi became head of the government in his absence. Yoadimnadji died on 23 February, leaving Younousmi as interim head of the government until Delwa Kassiré Koumakoye became the new prime minister on 26 February 2007. Younousmi remained Minister of State for Infrastructure in Koumakoye's government, named on 4 March.

Acting on the government's behalf, Younousmi signed a peace agreement with rebels in late 2007, including both the preliminary agreement on 4 October and the final agreement on 25 October. Younousmi was dismissed from the government on 17 August 2011. According to close associates, he was relieved to be away from government as he had other projects to work on. On 23 July 2013, Deby named him the Infrastructure Minister for the second time. Younousmi was accused of embezzling funds in June 2016.

He enjoys football and is a prominent member of the Chadian football federation.

Political offices
Preceded by Pascal Yoadimnadji	Prime Minister of Chad (acting); February 23, 2007 – 26 February 2007	Succeeded by Delwa Kassiré Koumakoye
