= Mahamat Hissene =

Chadian politician

Mahamat Hissene (died 7 July 2021) was a Chadian politician who served as the minister of communications and spokesman in the government of Youssouf Saleh Abbas. He also served in the National Assembly.
