= Delwa Kassiré Koumakoye =

Chadian politician

Nouradine Delwa Kassiré Koumakoye
- نور الدين دلوا كوماكوي

6th and 13th Prime Minister of Chad
- In office 26 February 2007 – 16 April 2008
- President: Idriss Déby
- Preceded by: Adoum Younousmi
- Succeeded by: Youssouf Saleh Abbas
- In office 6 November 1993 – 8 April 1995
- President: Idriss Déby
- Preceded by: Fidèle Moungar
- Succeeded by: Koibla Djimasta

Personal details
- Born: 31 December 1949 (age 75) Bongor, French Equatorial Africa (now Chad)
- Political party: VIVA-RNDP

Nouradine Delwa Kassiré Koumakoye (Arabic: نور الدين دلوا كوماكوي; born December 31, 1949) is a Chadian politician and the head of the National Rally for Development and Progress (VIVA-RNDP) political party. After serving as a minister in the government during the 1980s and early 1990s; he was Prime Minister of Chad from November 6, 1993 to April 8, 1995 and again from February 26, 2007 to April 16, 2008. In 2008, he became President of the Economic, Social and Cultural Council.

== Biography ==
Koumakoye was born in Bongor in southern Chad. From August 1975 to March 1979, he was Advisor for Administrative, Economic, and Financial Affairs at the Presidency of the Republic, and from January 1976 to June 1976 he was Director of the Technical Cabinet of the President of the Republic. He subsequently served in the government as Minister of Justice from June 1981 to May 1982 and became President of the Democratic and Popular National Rally (RNDP) on February 4, 1982.

As a judge, Koumakoye sentenced rebel leader Hissène Habré to death; later, however, Koumakoye became Minister of Public Works, Housing, and Urban Planning under Habré's presidency in August 1987. He served in that post until April 1988; subsequently he was Minister of Justice from April 1988 to March 1989, Minister of Post and Telecommunications from March 1989 to October 1990, and Minister of Higher Education and Scientific Research from October 1990 to December 1990.

Following Habré's ouster in December 1990, Koumakoye became President of the National Rally for Development and Progress (VIVA-RNDP) in January 1992, when it was founded. At the Sovereign National Conference in early 1993, he was a candidate to head the presidium but was defeated by Adoum Helbongo in a vote by delegates. Fidèle Moungar was chosen as transitional Prime Minister at the National Conference and Koumakoye became a member of his government, serving as Minister of Communications and Government Spokesman from April 1993 to June 1993 and as Minister of Justice from June 1993 to November 1993. He was then elected by Superior Council of the Transition (Conseil Supérieur de Transition, CST) as prime minister on November 6, 1993, replacing Moungar. After being elected, Koumakoye announced plans to reduce the size of the army by almost half; he also hoped to reach a social pact with the trade unions and to hold talks with rebels aimed at national reconciliation, in addition to making preparations for the multiparty elections intended to conclude the transitional period. His government was appointed on November 14, and it included nine members of Moungar's government; despite the presence of some members of the opposition, Koumakoye's government was dominated by the Patriotic Salvation Movement of President Idriss Déby.

After Koumakoye indicated his intention to run for President in the planned elections, President Déby asked the CST to change the transitional charter so that the Prime Minister could not run, and the CST accordingly did so in late March 1995. On April 8, 1995, the CST removed Koumakoye from his post as prime minister and chose Koibla Djimasta to replace him. In March 1996, Koumakoye was arrested for alleged illegal weapons possession and sentenced to three months in prison; according to Amnesty International, the trial was unfair and apparently intended to keep Koumakoye from contesting the election. In the presidential election, held in June 1996, he was nevertheless a candidate and received 2.29% of the vote, placing ninth.

He ran again in the May 2001 presidential election, taking 2.36% of the vote and sixth place. Koumakoye's primary support base is in Tandjilé in the south.

In the 2002 parliamentary election, Koumakoye was elected to the National Assembly of Chad as an VIVA-RNDP candidate from Kélo constituency in Tandjilé Ouest Department. and he became President of the External Affairs and International Cooperation Commission in the National Assembly. From March 2004 to August 2006, he was a member of the Pan-African Parliament. In the presidential election held on May 3, 2006, which was boycotted by most of the opposition, Koumakoye came in second place with 15.13% of the vote according to final official results, far behind Déby; this was, however, a significant improvement over the 8% of the vote credited to him in the provisional results. On May 29, shortly after the final results were announced, he congratulated Déby on winning the election.

On August 15, 2006, Koumakoye was appointed to the government as Minister of State for Regional Planning, Town Planning, and Housing, serving in that position until he was appointed as prime minister for the second time on February 26, 2007, a few days after the death of Pascal Yoadimnadji.

On April 15, 2008, Youssouf Abbas Saleh was appointed to replace Koumakoye as prime minister. It was reported that Koumakoye was dismissed because he opposed the implementation of the agreement signed by political parties of the ruling majority and the opposition in August 2007; the agreement involved a number of reforms and was intended to lead to a new parliamentary election in 2009. Déby then appointed Koumakoye as a member of the Economic, Social and Cultural Council on April 24, 2008, and Koumakoye became the Council's President.

Political offices
Preceded by Fidèle Moungar	Prime Minister of Chad; 1993–1995	Succeeded by Koibla Djimasta
Preceded by Adoum Younousmi	Prime Minister of Chad; 2007–2008	Succeeded by Youssouf Saleh Abbas
