= Bebidja =

Bebidja is an area of Chad. It has large oil reserves and has such been of interest to foreign oil companies such as ExxonMobil, Shell and Elf.
