= Emmanuel Nadingar =

Chadian politician

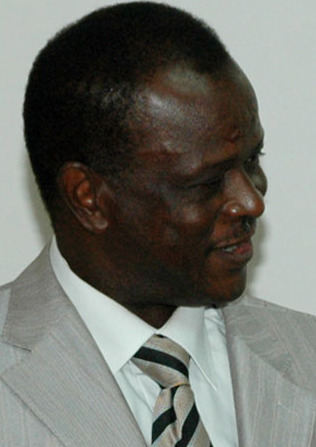

15th Prime Minister of Chad
- In office 5 March 2010 – 21 January 2013
- President: Idriss Déby
- Preceded by: Youssouf Saleh Abbas
- Succeeded by: Djimrangar Dadnadji

Personal details
- Born: 1951 (age 74–75) Bebidja, French Equatorial Africa (now Chad)
- Party: Patriotic Salvation Movement

Emmanuel Djelassem Nadingar (Arabic: إيمانويل نادينغار; born 1951) is a Chadian politician who served as Prime Minister of Chad from March 2010 to January 2013.

== Political career ==
A native of Bebidja in southwestern Chad, Nadingar was born in 1951. He obtained a degree in accounting in Brazzaville.

Nadingar founded a political party, the National Party for Recovery and Development, during the mid-1990s. He was first appointed to the government as Secretary of State for Economic Promotion and Development on 14 August 2001; later, he was appointed as Deputy Secretary-General of the Government in 2003. After entering the government, he merged his party into the ruling Patriotic Salvation Movement (MPS).

Nadingar was Acting Minister of Defense in 2004. In that post, one of his key concerns was violence in eastern Chad, near the Sudanese border. The violence was caused by Janjaweed militia who were assigned by the Sudanese government to fight rebels in Darfur but began conducting raids into Chadian territory. On 9 May 2004, he announced that Chadian forces had clashed with Janjaweed raiders on 5 May; according to Nadingar, 60 Janjaweed were killed in the battle, along with one Chadian soldier and six civilians, and the Janjaweed were driven back. On that occasion, Nadingar expressed the Chadian government's frustration with the raids: "We are in such a situation that we fear our patience could have limits."

Another major concern for Nadingar at the Defense Ministry was keeping order within the armed forces, which included some dissatisfied elements who reportedly sought the ouster of President Idriss Déby. The problem was illustrated by an incident of military unrest that occurred on 16 May 2004. Nadingar said on 18 May that the government was making progress in negotiations with a group of rebel soldiers who were holding out at the Gassi garrison in eastern N'Djamena. He sought to downplay the seriousness of the incident, saying that the soldiers had not wanted to remove President Idriss Déby from power but were merely dissatisfied over the suspension of their pay. Due to a problem of nonexistent soldiers who were on the army payroll due to corruption, pay had been suspended for two months while the government tried to correct the payroll. According to Nadingar, "the mutineers acknowledge their wrong-doing but fear for their security." Although Nadingar had tried to downplay the situation, Déby alleged on 19 May that the soldiers had intended to assassinate him.

Having previously served in an acting capacity, Nadingar was formally appointed as Minister of Defense, Veterans, and War Victims on 23 July 2004. Later, he was Minister of Oil and then Minister-Delegate for Decentralization from 2008 to 2010 under Prime Minister Youssouf Saleh Abbas. He is a member of the MPS Political Bureau as of 2010.

=== As Prime Minister ===
Saleh Abbas submitted his resignation to President Déby on 5 March 2010 and Déby immediately appointed Nadingar to replace him. Nadingar took office on 6 March.

Some interpreted Nadingar's appointment in light of the fact that he was native to the same area as Ngarlejy Yorongar, a key opposition leader. Déby may have hoped that Nadingar would be able to defeat Yorongar in Bebidja during the next parliamentary election. Previously Nadingar had been unable to do so, but he would wield more clout as Prime Minister.

On 21 January 2013, Nadingar resigned and Djimrangar Dadnadji was appointed to replace him.

Political offices
Preceded by Youssouf Saleh Abbas	Prime Minister of Chad; 2010–2013	Succeeded by Djimrangar Dadnadji
