= Kabia =

Town in ancient Bithynia

Coordinates: 40°30′00″N 30°18′00″E

Kabia was a town of ancient Bithynia, inhabited during Roman times.

Its site is located near Geyve in Asiatic Turkey.
