= 1990 Chadian parliamentary election =

- 8 July 1990
- All 123 seats in the National Assembly
- Turnout: 56.06%
Party	Vote %	Seats
Independents	100	123
This lists parties that won seats. See the complete results below.

Parliamentary elections were held in Chad on 8 July 1990. They were the first elections since 1969 and followed a referendum the previous year which had made the country a one-party state, with the National Union for Independence and Revolution as the sole legal party. However, all 436 candidates stood for election as independents. Voter turnout was 56%.

== Background ==
Chad had endured a mostly unstable government since its independence in 1960 into the 1980s, including prolonged periods of civil war. In 1982, Hissène Habré gained control of the government and instituted a somewhat stable but authoritarian dictatorship, backed by the United States and France. Beginning in 1988, Habré began to allow slivers of democracy into the government, with regional congresses and a constitutional committee being held.

A 1989 referendum created the National Assembly, though it gave the Assembly no meaningful authority. The 1990 elections were held to fill the new Assembly. All candidates officially ran as independents, though the constitution created a single-party state under Habré's National Union for Independence and Revolution party.

== Results ==
Party	Votes	%	Seats
Independents			123
Total			123
Total votes	1,622,838	–	
Registered voters/turnout	2,894,825	56.06	
Source: African Elections Database

== Aftermath ==
The new Assembly would prove to be short-lived. In December 1990, six months after the election, the Patriotic Salvation Movement (MPS) under Idriss Déby would successfully overthrow Habré's government. The MPS suspended the constitution and Assembly upon gaining power, promising an eventual multiparty democracy. After a slow democratization process, a meaningful multi-party National Assembly was finally elected in 1997.
