= Djimrangar Dadnadji =

Chadian politician (1954–2019)

Joseph Djimrangar Dadnadji
- جوزيف جمرانقار دادناجي
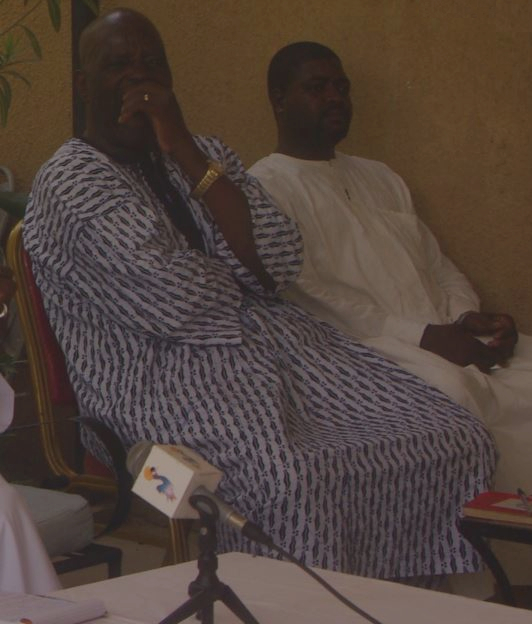
- Dadnadji in 2016

16th Prime Minister of Chad
- In office 21 January 2013 – 21 November 2013
- President: Idriss Déby
- Preceded by: Emmanuel Nadingar
- Succeeded by: Kalzeubet Pahimi Deubet

Personal details
- Born: 1 January 1954 French Equatorial Africa (present-day Mandoul Region, Chad)
- Died: 31 December 2019 (aged 65) N'Djamena, Chad
- Political party: Patriotic Salvation Movement

Joseph Djimrangar Dadnadji (Arabic: جوزيف جمرانقار دادناجي; 1 January 1954 – 31 December 2019) was a Chadian politician who was Prime Minister of Chad in 2013.

== Life and career ==
Dadnadji joined the civil service in 1975. He was Director-General of the Ministry of National Education from October 1996 to June 2002 and was then appointed to the government as Minister of Planning, Development, and Cooperation on 12 June 2002. One year later, he was instead appointed as Minister of the Environment and Water, serving in that post from July 2003 to July 2004. Subsequently, he was Technical Adviser to the President for Legal and Administrative Affairs and Human Rights from October 2004 to August 2005 and Secretary-General of the Presidency from August 2005 to May 2008. Afterwards, he was Director of the Civil Cabinet of the Presidency from May 2008 to October 2009, and he served a second stint as Secretary-General of the Presidency from November 2009 to March 2010.

On 9 March 2010, Dadnadji was appointed to the government as Minister of Spatial Planning, Urban Planning, and Housing, remaining in that post until 17 August 2011, when he was dismissed from the government.

Dadnadji was again appointed as Director of the Civil Cabinet of the Presidency on 3 September 2012, but he remained in that post for only a few months; on 21 January 2013, Prime Minister Emmanuel Nadingar resigned, and President Idriss Déby promptly appointed Dadnadji to replace him. Dadnadji's government, composed of 42 members, was appointed on 26 January 2013.

Dadnadji served as Prime Minister for less than a year. He resigned from his post on 21 November 2013 after ruling party deputies called a vote against him on charges of ordering "arbitrary arrests of deputies". President Déby promptly appointed Kalzeubet Pahimi Deubet to replace Dadnadji later in the day.

== Death ==
Dadnadji died on 31 December 2019, at the age of 65, one day before his 66th birthday.

Political offices
Preceded by Emmanuel Nadingar	Prime Minister of Chad; 2013	Succeeded by Kalzeubet Pahimi Deubet
