= Pascal Yoadimnadji =

Chadian politician (1950–2007)

Pascal Yoadimnadji (Arabic: باسكال يواديماندجي; 8 April 1950 – 23 February 2007) was a Chadian politician. He was Prime Minister of Chad from February 2005 to his death in February 2007.

== Biography ==
Yoadimnadji was born in Béboto in the Logone Oriental Region of southern Chad, on 8 April 1950. He was a member of the Gor ethnic group, and was a lawyer.

He served as head of the National Electoral Commission from 1995 to 1997, during which time the 1996 presidential election was held. He was appointed as Minister of Mines, Energy and Oil on 21 May 1997, and subsequently he became Minister of Tourist Development in 1998 and Minister of the Environment and Water in 1999. He then served as President of the Constitutional Council from 1999 to 2004 and was appointed as Minister of Agriculture on 23 July 2004.

Yoadimnadji headed La Francophonie's observer mission for the January 2003 parliamentary election in Djibouti.

He became Prime Minister on 3 February 2005, when he was appointed by President Idriss Déby following the resignation of Moussa Faki. On 24 August 2005, Yoadimnadji announced that the government of Chad would remove all the accomplices of Chad's former leader, Hissène Habré, from official positions. He approved extending a state of emergency in November 2006 for six months in eastern provinces due to a rise in ethnic clashes that killed as many as 400 people. Yoadimnadji called for a mobilization of soldiers after the Darfur conflict spilled into Chad. The Los Angeles Times reported that "although he was a senior government figure, Yoadimnadji was not a major player in Chadian politics."

On 21 February 2007, Yoadimnadji suffered a heart attack and fell into a coma, and he was flown to France for medical treatment. He died of a brain hemorrhage on 23 February at a hospital in Paris. Seven days of mourning were declared for him in Chad, beginning on 23 February. On 26 February, he received a state funeral in N'Djamena, in which he was praised by Déby. His body was then given to his family for burial in Béboto. A school has been named after him.

Political offices
| Preceded by Moussa Faki | Prime Minister of Chad; 4 February 2005 – 23 February 2007 | Succeeded by Adoum Younousmi (acting) |
