= List of prime ministers of Chad =

Prime Minister of Chad
- رئيس وزراء تشاد (Arabic); Premier ministre du Tchad (French)
- Coat of arms of Chad

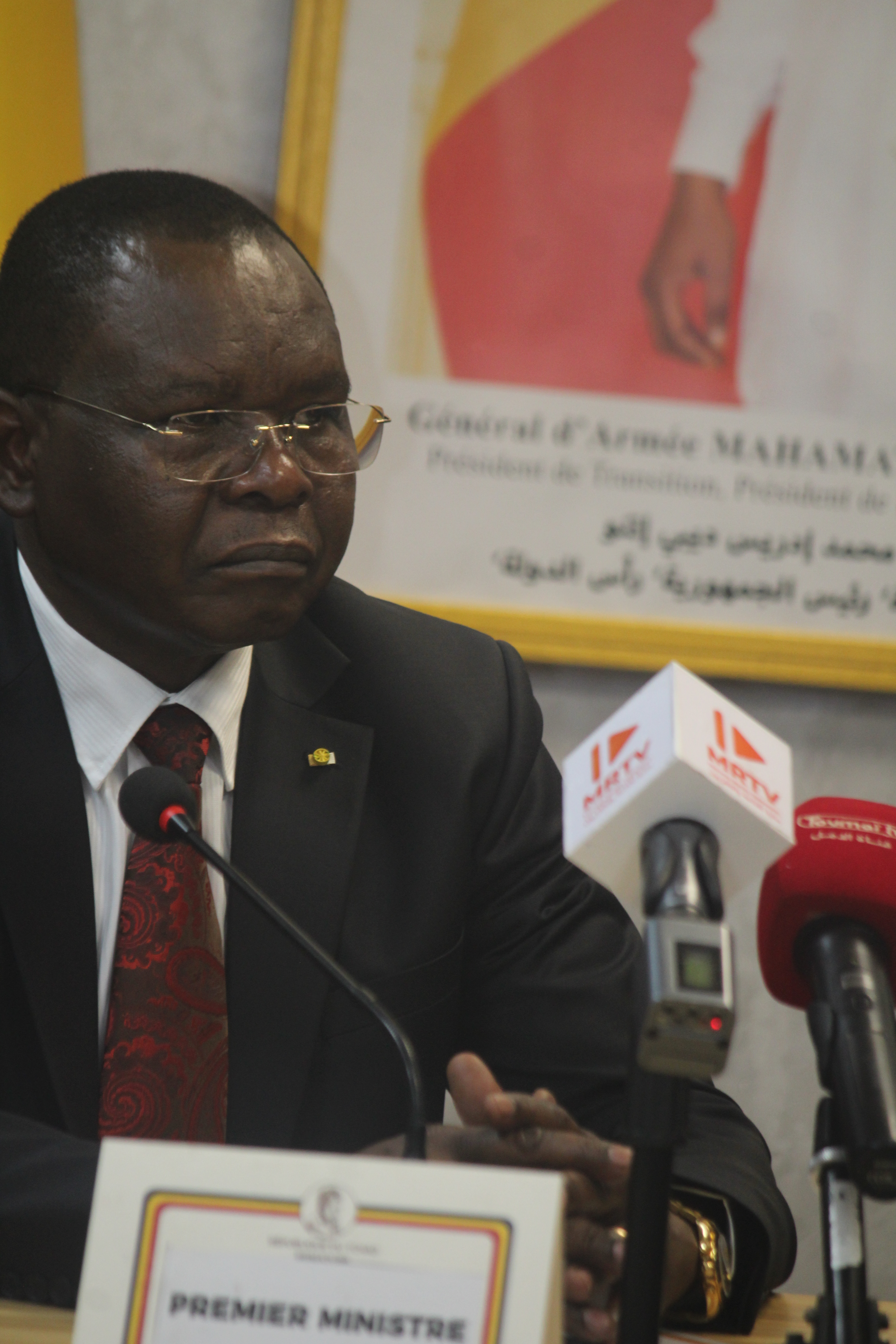
- Incumbent; Allamaye Halina since 23 May 2024
- Style: Prime Minister (informal); His Excellency (formal, diplomatic)
- Type: Head of government
- Reports to: President; Parliament
- Seat: N'Djamena
- Appointer: President; At the pleasure of the President
- Term length: No term limits specified
- Formation: 29 August 1978; 48 years ago
- First holder: Hissène Habré

This is a list of prime ministers of Chad since the formation of the post of prime minister of Chad in 1978 to the present day.

A total of twenty people have served as prime minister of Chad (not counting one acting prime minister). Additionally, two persons, Delwa Kassiré Koumakoye and Albert Pahimi Padacké, have served on two non-consecutive occasions.

The current prime minister of Chad is Allamaye Halina, since 23 May 2024.

== List of officeholders ==
Political parties

National Liberation Front of Chad (FROLINAT)–Armed Forces of the North (FAN)
Rally for Unity and Democracy in Chad (RUDT)
Union for Democracy and Republic (UDR)
National Union for Democracy and Renewal (UNDR)
Chadian Action for Unity and Socialism (ACTUS)
National Rally for Development and Progress (VIVA–RNDP)
Patriotic Salvation Movement (MPS)
National Rally of Chadian Democrats (RNDT–Le Réveil)
Les Transformateurs

Other factions

Independent

Status

Acting prime minister

No.	Portrait	Name (Birth–Death)	Term of office			Political party	Cabinet(s)	Head(s) of state	Ref.
No.	Portrait	Name (Birth–Death)	Took office	Left office	Time in office	Political party	Cabinet(s)	Head(s) of state	Ref.
1		Hissène Habré (1942–2021)	29 August 1978	23 March 1979 (Deposed)	206 days	FROLINAT–FAN	Habré	Malloum	
Post abolished (23 March 1979 – 19 May 1982)
2		Djidingar Dono Ngardoum (1928–2000)	19 May 1982	19 June 1982	31 days	RUDT	Ngardoum	Oueddei	
2		Djidingar Dono Ngardoum (1928–2000)	19 May 1982	19 June 1982	31 days	RUDT	Ngardoum	Habré	
Post abolished (19 June 1982 – 4 March 1991)
3		Jean Alingué Bawoyeu (born 1937)	4 March 1991	20 May 1992	1 year, 77 days	UDR	Bawoyeu	I. Déby	
4		Joseph Yodoyman (1950–1993)	20 May 1992	7 April 1993	322 days	UNDR	Yodoyman	I. Déby	
5		Fidèle Moungar (born 1948)	7 April 1993	6 November 1993	213 days	ACTUS	Moungar	I. Déby	
6		Delwa Kassiré Koumakoye (born 1949)	6 November 1993	8 April 1995	1 year, 153 days	VIVA–RNDP	Koumakoye	I. Déby	
7		Koibla Djimasta (1950–2007)	8 April 1995	17 May 1997	2 years, 39 days	UDR	Djimasta	I. Déby	
8		Nassour Guelendouksia Ouaido (born 1947)	17 May 1997	13 December 1999	2 years, 210 days	MPS	Ouaido	I. Déby	
9		Nagoum Yamassoum (born 1954)	13 December 1999	12 June 2002	2 years, 181 days	MPS	Yamassoum	I. Déby	
10		Haroun Kabadi (born 1949)	12 June 2002	24 June 2003	1 year, 12 days	MPS	Kabadi	I. Déby	
11		Moussa Faki (born 1960)	24 June 2003	3 February 2005	1 year, 224 days	MPS	Faki	I. Déby	
12		Pascal Yoadimnadji (1950–2007)	3 February 2005	23 February 2007 (Died in office)	2 years, 20 days	MPS	Yoadimnadji	I. Déby	
–		Adoum Younousmi (born 1962)	23 February 2007	26 February 2007	3 days	MPS	Yoadimnadji	I. Déby	
(6)		Delwa Kassiré Koumakoye (born 1949)	26 February 2007	15 April 2008	1 year, 49 days	VIVA–RNDP	Koumakoye	I. Déby	
13		Youssouf Saleh Abbas (born c. 1953)	15 April 2008	5 March 2010	1 year, 324 days	Independent	Abbas	I. Déby	
14		Emmanuel Nadingar (born 1951)	5 March 2010	21 January 2013	2 years, 322 days	MPS	Nadingar I	I. Déby	
14		Emmanuel Nadingar (born 1951)	5 March 2010	21 January 2013	2 years, 322 days	MPS	Nadingar II	I. Déby	
15		Djimrangar Dadnadji (1954–2019)	21 January 2013	21 November 2013	304 days	MPS	Dadnadji	I. Déby	
16		Kalzeubet Pahimi Deubet (born 1957)	21 November 2013	15 February 2016	2 years, 86 days	MPS	Deubet	I. Déby	
17		Albert Pahimi Padacké (born 1966)	15 February 2016	4 May 2018	2 years, 78 days	RNDT–Le Réveil	Padacké I	I. Déby	
17		Albert Pahimi Padacké (born 1966)	15 February 2016	4 May 2018	2 years, 78 days	RNDT–Le Réveil	Padacké II	I. Déby	
Post abolished (4 May 2018 – 26 April 2021)
(17)		Albert Pahimi Padacké (born 1966)	26 April 2021	12 October 2022	1 year, 169 days	RNDT–Le Réveil	Padacké III	M. Déby	
18		Saleh Kebzabo (born 1947)	12 October 2022	1 January 2024	1 year, 81 days	UNDR	Kebzabo	M. Déby	
19		Succès Masra (born 1983)	1 January 2024	22 May 2024	142 days	Les Transformateurs	Masra	M. Déby	
20		Allamaye Halina (born 1967)	23 May 2024	Incumbent	2 years, 178 days	Independent	Halina I	M. Déby	
20		Allamaye Halina (born 1967)	23 May 2024	Incumbent	2 years, 178 days	Independent	Halina II	M. Déby	
20		Allamaye Halina (born 1967)	23 May 2024	Incumbent	2 years, 178 days	Independent	Halina III	M. Déby	

== See also ==
- Politics of Chad
- List of heads of state of Chad
- Vice President of Chad
- History of Chad
- List of colonial governors of Chad
