= Supreme Court of Chad =

The Supreme Court (French: Cour Suprême) is the highest jurisdiction of Chad in judiciary, administrative and tributary fields.

== The Supreme Court in the Constitution ==
Apart from being the country's highest jurisdiction, the court is also in charge of monitoring the regular ongoing of local elections. The Court is divided in three chambers of justice, with jurisdiction respectively in judiciary, administrative and auditing matters (article 152 of the constitution).

As established by article 153 of the constitution, the Supreme Court is composed of 16 members, of whom the Chief Justice is selected by the Head of State among the highest ranking judges of the country. Of the remaining members of the Court, called Councilors and appointed for life (article 154), eight are designed by the Head of State and seven by the Speaker of the National Assembly. Their selection takes place among both the country's chief judges (eight) and experts in public accountancy and in administrative and financial law.

== Creation ==
The legislation necessary to provide for the implementation of a Supreme Court as disposed by the Constitution of 1996 was approved by 1999, and President Idriss Déby officially had it installed on April 28 when he swore in office the members of the Court. Due to inadequate funding, the court became fully operational only in October 2000.

President Idriss Déby took advantage of the occasion provided by the swearing in office of the judges to reaffirm the impartiality and the independence of the Chadian legal system, and to signal that it was the first time Chad had ever been given such a high judiciary instance.
