= Constitutional Council (Chad) =

Chad's constitutional court

The Constitutional Council of Chad judges the constitutionality of legislation and treaties in Chad. It consists of nine judges who are elected to 9-year terms. It is established by Title VII of the Constitution of Chad.

== Sources ==
- Background Notes on Chad from the United States Department of State
