= Kalzeubet Pahimi Deubet =

Chadian businessman and politician

- كالزوبيد بحيمي دولي
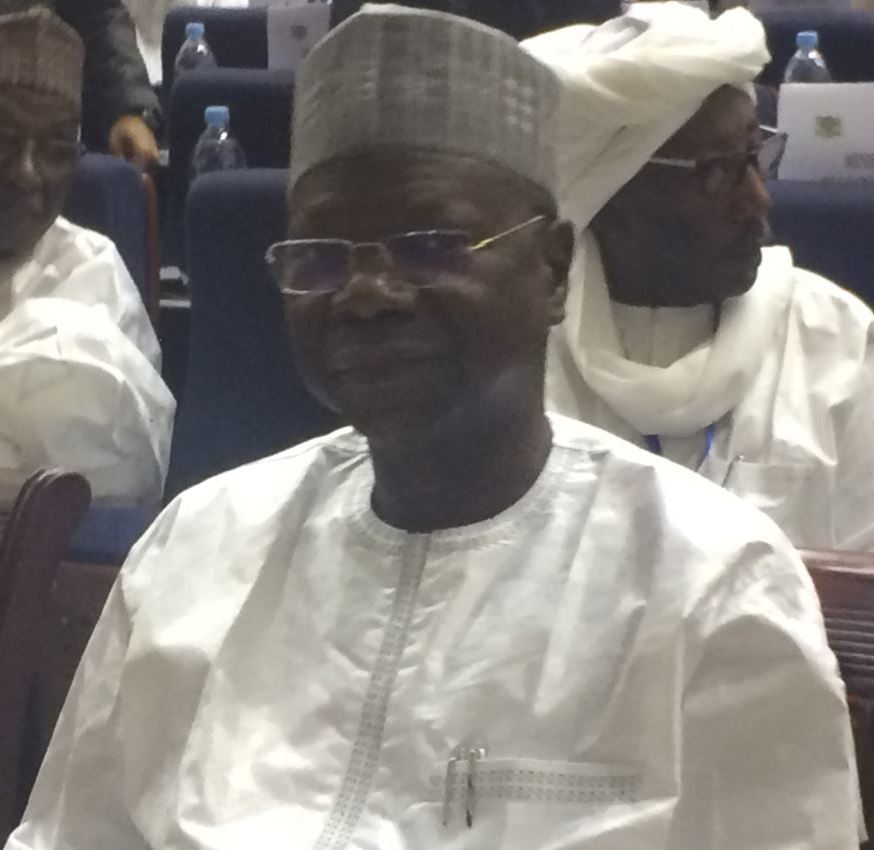
- Deubet in 2018

Prime Minister of Chad
- In office 21 November 2013 – 15 February 2016
- President: Idriss Déby
- Preceded by: Djimrangar Dadnadji
- Succeeded by: Albert Pahimi Padacké

Personal details
- Born: 1 January 1957 (age 68); Lac Léré, French Equatorial; Africa (now Chad)
- Political party: Patriotic Salvation Movement

Kalzeubet Pahimi Deubet (born 1 January 1957) is a Chadian businessman and politician who was Prime Minister of Chad from November 2013 to February 2016.

== Early life and career ==
Deubet was the head of the state-owned cotton parastatal.

== Politics ==
Deubet served in the government as Minister of the Civil Service and Minister of Communication. Following the resignation of Prime Minister Djimrangar Dadnadji over allegations of ordering arbitrary arrests, Deubet was appointed as Prime Minister on 21 November 2013.

Deubet resigned on 13 February 2016 and President Idriss Déby appointed Albert Pahimi Padacké to replace him.

Political offices
Preceded by Djimrangar Dadnadji	Prime Minister of Chad; 2013–2016	Succeeded by Albert Pahimi Padacké
