= Youssouf Saleh Abbas =

Chadian political figure

- يوسف صالح عباس

14th Prime Minister of Chad
- In office 15 April 2008 – 5 March 2010
- President: Idriss Déby
- Preceded by: Delwa Kassiré Koumakoye
- Succeeded by: Emmanuel Nadingar

Personal details
- Born: c. 1953 (age 72–73) Abéché, French Chad

Youssouf Saleh Abbas (Arabic: يوسف صالح عباس Yūsuf Ṣāliḥ ʿAbbās; born c. 1953) is a Chadian political figure who was Prime Minister of Chad from April 2008 to March 2010. He was previously a diplomatic adviser and special representative of President Idriss Déby.

== Political career ==
Abbas was born in Abéché in Ouaddai Region, in the east of Chad. He studied in Patrice Lumumba Peoples' Friendship University of Russia and then in France, earning a master's degree in international relations. Back in Chad, he worked at the Ministry of Foreign Affairs as head of the Multilateral Cooperation Division and as Director of International Cooperation from November 20, 1979, to January 30, 1981. He was then diplomatic advisor to Goukouni Oueddei, the President of the Transitional Government of National Unity (GUNT), from June 1, 1981, to December 25, 1981 and Director of the Cabinet of the Head of State from December 6, 1981, until Oueddei's ouster on June 7, 1982. From May 15 to May 31, 1981, he chaired the “Seminaire National des Cadres” the national high level Forum that contributed to avoid a dislocation of the country between politico-military factions and restore national unity in Chad.

Later, Abbas was advisor to the Director-General of the Ministry of Foreign Affairs from November 20, 1992, to December 15, 1996. He was also vice-president of the Sovereign National Conference, which was held from January 1993 to April 1993. From December 16, 1996, to August 13, 1997, he was Director-General of the Ministry of Planning and Cooperation. He conducted consultancy work for UNDP and USAID between 1994 and 1997. From August 1997 to December 1999, he was the Director-General of the Agence Tchadienne d’Exécution des Travaux d’Intérêt Public with the support and cooperation of the World Bank.

Abbas, in opposition to President Déby, joined the Tibesti-based Movement for Democracy and Justice in Chad (MDJT), a rebel group led by Youssouf Togoïmi, when it was formed in October 1998, serving from Paris (he lived in exile in France for several years) as the group's External Coordinator. On October 31, 2001, he resigned from the MDJT, along with three other members of the MDJT's External Coordination, due to what he described as Togoïmi's "excesses". After an agreement with the government, he returned to Chad. He joined with Déby in 2006 and became Déby's Advisor for International Relations and Cooperation on December 24, 2006, as well as Déby's Special Representative, with state ministerial rank, to the European Union Force and the United Nations Mission in the Central African Republic and Chad (MINURCAT) on November 17, 2007. He remained in his posts as Advisor and Special Representative until his appointment as Prime Minister. He is not member of any political party.

=== As Prime Minister ===
On April 15, 2008, Déby appointed Abbas as Prime Minister, dismissing Prime Minister Delwa Kassiré Koumakoye. Speaking on the radio afterwards, Abbas said that he would seek to work with other political parties when forming his government. He noted that popular expectations were high but said that his task would not be easy. The appointment of Abbas, an easterner, marked a departure from Déby's standard practice of appointing prime ministers from the south (Déby himself is a northerner) and was presumably intended to help resolve the rebellion in the east. At the time of his appointment, Abbas was considered a relative unknown among the public, but he was well regarded in political circles.

The various Chadian rebel groups reacted to the appointment of Abbas in different ways. Mahamat Nouri of the National Alliance said that no fundamental change could occur under Déby and described the appointment as a meaningless "non-event". The Union of Forces for Change and Democracy said that it would wait to see how much room for maneuver Déby would give Abbas, while the Rally of the Forces for Change said that it would wait to see what Abbas' political programme would be.

The main coalition of opposition parties, the Coordination of Political Parties for Defence of the Constitution (CPDC), had previously suspended talks with the government following the February 2008 battle of N'Djamena, during which three opposition leaders (including CPDC spokesman Ibni Oumar Mahamat Saleh) had been arrested. Following the appointment of Abbas, the CPDC agreed to join the government in a meeting with Abbas on April 19, although some in the coalition, including Ibni Oumar Mahamat Saleh's Party for Liberties and Development (PLD), disagreed with this decision. They wanted Abbas to disclose what had happened to Saleh (who was still missing) in exchange for their participation in the government.

Abbas's government was announced on April 23, and it included four members of the CPDC in key portfolios: Defense (held by Wadal Abdelkader Kamougué), Justice (held by Jean Alingué), Planning, Urban Development and Housing (held by Hamit Mahamat Dahalob), and Agriculture (held by Naimbaye Nossunian). The PLD refused to participate because Saleh had not been released. The government included 25 ministers and eight secretaries of state. A key task of the government led by Abbas was the implementation of the agreement between governing and opposition political parties, which was signed in August 2007 and was intended to lead to a parliamentary election in 2009.

Abbas remained in office for nearly two years. After December 2009, he held no further meetings of the government, and it was believed that there were "political differences" between Abbas and Déby. Abbas submitted his resignation to Déby on March 5, 2010, and Déby immediately appointed Emmanuel Nadingar to replace him.

== Notable people ==
- Mahamat Hissene, Chadian Communications Minister in the government of Youssouf Saleh Abbas

Political offices
Preceded by Delwa Kassiré Koumakoye	Prime Minister of Chad; 2008–2010	Succeeded by Emmanuel Nadingar
