= Albert Pahimi Padacké =

17th Prime Minister of Chad

- ألبر بهيمي بدكي
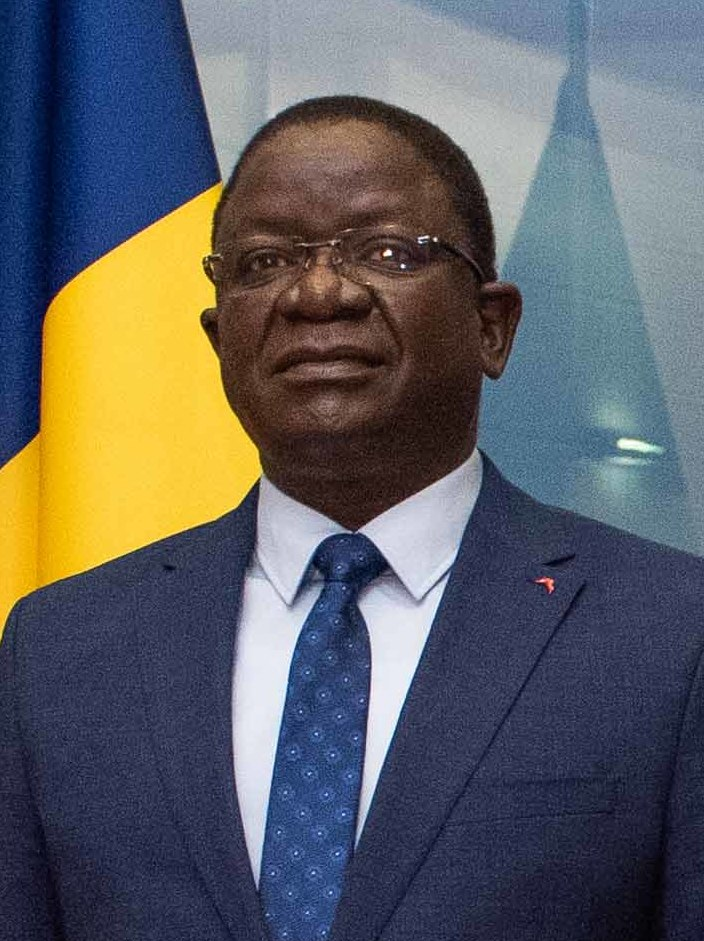
- Padacké in 2021

Prime Minister of Chad
- In office 26 April 2021 – 12 October 2022
- President: Mahamat Déby
- Preceded by: Himself in 2018
- Succeeded by: Saleh Kebzabo
- In office 15 February 2016 – 4 May 2018
- President: Idriss Déby
- Preceded by: Kalzeubet Pahimi Deubet
- Succeeded by: Himself in 2021

Personal details
- Born: 15 November 1966 (age 59) Gouin, French Equatorial; Africa (now Chad)
- Party: National Rally for Democracy
- Education: University of N'Djamena

Albert Pahimi Padacké (Arabic: ألبر بهيمي بدكي, born 15 November 1966) is a Chadian politician who was Prime Minister of Chad from 26 April 2021 to 12 October 2022. He was also Prime Minister from 2016 to 2018, when he resigned and was not replaced.

== Life and career ==
Padacké was born in Gouin, Sub-prefecture of Pala, in November 1966. He holds a master's degree in public law and several degrees, including the 1st Certificate of University Studies in Law from University of N'Djamena.

During the 1990s, Pahimi Padacké was minister of finance and later Minister of Trade until being dismissed by President Idriss Déby in November 1997 for being absent from his work; Déby unexpectedly visited government buildings and dismissed Pahimi Padacké, along with two other ministers, when he found that they were not present. Pahimi Padacké later became Secretary of State for Finances in February 2001, before becoming Minister of Mines, Energy, and Oil in the government named on April 8, 2001. In August 2001, he became Minister without Portfolio, holding that post until June 2002.

Pahimi Padacké was elected to the National Assembly in the April 2002 parliamentary election as a National Rally for Democracy in Chad (RNDP-Le Réveil) candidate in Pala constituency, in Mayo-Dallah Department. From June 2002 to August 2005, he was a member of the Economic and Monetary Community of Central Africa. He was then appointed as Minister of Agriculture in the government named on August 7, 2005.

He was the RNDP-Le Réveil presidential candidate in the May 2006 presidential election, in which he placed third with 7.82% of the vote. On May 29, shortly after final results were announced, he congratulated Idriss Déby on winning the election. The main opposition parties did not participate in the election, claiming it to be fraudulent.

Pahimi Padacké served as Minister of Agriculture until he was appointed as Minister of Justice in the government named on March 4, 2007. He was subsequently moved to the position of Minister of Posts, Information Technologies and Communications in the government announced on April 23, 2008.

Idriss Déby appointed Pahimi Padacké as prime minister on 13 February 2016.

As part of a total restructuring of the post-2021 transitional government, Pahimi Padacké resigned from the office of prime minister on 11 October 2022. Mahamat Déby replaced Pahimi Padacké with Saleh Kebzabo on the following day, 12 October.

On March 13, 2024, Albert Pahimi Padacké was nominated by his party, the National Rally for Democracy in Chad (RNDT-Le Réveil) as candidate for the presidential election of May 6, 2024.

Political offices
Preceded by Kalzeubet Pahimi Deubet	Prime Minister of Chad; 2016–2018	Succeeded by office abolished
Preceded by office re-established	Prime Minister of Chad; 2021–2022	Succeeded by Saleh Kebzabo
