= Sarari =

Sarari or variations can refer to:

- Sărari, a village in the Predeal-Sărari commune in Prahova County, Romania
- Huda Al-Sarari (born c. 1978), Yemeni human rights lawyer
- Huda El-Sarari (born 1974), Libyan journalist and television executive
- Fauja Singh Sarari, Indian politician
