= Philip Alston =

Australian law scholar

- Born: 4 September 1950 (age 76); Melbourne, Australia
- Citizenship: Australia
- Occupations: Legal scholar; International law expert
- Employer: New York University School of Law
- Known for: UN Special Rapporteur on extrajudicial, summary or arbitrary executions (2004–2010); UN Special Rapporteur on extreme poverty and human rights (2014–2020)
- Title: John Norton Pomeroy Professor of Law
- Awards: Officer of the Order of Australia (2010); Honorary Doctor of Laws, University of Essex (2009)

Academic background
- Education: University of Melbourne (LLB); University of California, Berkeley (LLM)

Philip Geoffrey Alston AO is an Australian international law scholar and human rights practitioner. He is John Norton Pomeroy Professor of Law at New York University School of Law, and co-chair of the law school's Center for Human Rights and Global Justice. In human rights law, Alston has held a range of senior UN appointments for over two decades, including United Nations Special Rapporteur on extrajudicial, summary or arbitrary executions, a position he held from August 2004 to July 2010, and UN Special Rapporteur on extreme poverty and human rights from 2014-2020.

== Background ==
Alston was a resident at Ormond College and graduated from the University of Melbourne with an LL.B.(Hons.) in 1972 and from the University of California, Berkeley with an LL.M. in 1976 and a JSD (Doctor of Juridical Science) in 1980.

His brother is the former Australian federal Cabinet minister and High Commissioner to the United Kingdom, Richard Alston.

== Career ==
Alston's first academic appointments were at Tufts University (1985–89) and Harvard Law School (1984–89). Alston was then professor at the Australian National University (1990–95), and also director of its Center for International and Public Law. He was then professor at the European University Institute (1996–2001), before moving to New York University School of Law, where he is the John Norton Pomeroy Professor of Law and co-chair of the law school's Center for Human Rights and Global Justice. He became a faculty instructor in the NYU Law Institute for Executive Education, which was launched in 2015.

== United Nations ==
In human rights law, Alston has held a range of senior UN appointments for over two decades. From 1986 to 1991 he was the first Rapporteur for the UN Committee on Economic, Social and Cultural Rights; he then chaired the committee from 1991 to 1998.

At the 1993 World Conference on Human Rights he was elected to chair the first meeting of the presidents and Chairs of all of the international human rights courts and committees (including the European Court of Human Rights, the Inter-American Human Rights Court, the African Commission on Human and Peoples' Rights, and the UN Human Rights Committee).

He was appointed by the United Nations Secretary-General in 1988 to suggest reforms to make the United Nations human rights treaty monitoring system more effective. His major reports in 1989, 1993, and 1997 provided the impetus for continuing efforts by the UN Office of the High Commissioner for Human Rights and the UN Human Rights Council to streamline and improve the rather unwieldy monitoring system.

His other United Nations appointments include Special Adviser to the UN High Commissioner for Human Rights on the Millennium Development Goals. He was appointed to that post by Sergio Vieira de Mello, and has continued to advise successor High Commissioners, including Louise Arbour and Navanethem Pillay.

=== Special rapporteur ===
On extrajudicial, summary or arbitrary executions

From August 2004 – July 2010 he was the United Nations Special Rapporteur on extrajudicial, summary or arbitrary executions.

On extreme poverty and human rights

In 2014, Alston became UN Special Rapporteur on extreme poverty and human rights, a position established by the OHCHR in 1998 and later transferred to the Human Rights Council in 2006. The mandate aims to raise awareness of extreme poverty and highlight the human rights violations faced by those living in such conditions.

In May 2015, Alston submitted his first report to the Human Rights Council in his capacity as Special Rapporteur on extreme poverty Alston's 2015 report linked extreme poverty to extreme inequality, showing how inequality undermines human rights and perpetuates discrimination. He proposed an agenda including reducing inequality, prioritizing economic and social rights, recognizing social protection rights, implementing redistributive fiscal policies, and centering resource redistribution in human rights discussions.

In October 2016, Alston condemned the UN's refusal to accept responsibility for the 2010 Haiti cholera outbreak caused by infected Nepalese peacekeepers, calling it a "disgrace" that undermines the UN's credibility in holding others accountable for human rights violations. He criticized the UN's Office of Legal Affairs for advising denial of responsibility—possibly under U.S. pressure—despite the UN's immunity from lawsuits, and warned this denial would hamper fundraising for the $400 million relief package. Alston urged advocacy groups to continue pressuring UN Member States to ensure accountability.

In 2017, Alston investigated systemic poverty in the United States, noting that despite the country's great wealth, significant poverty and inequality exist. His investigation examined how poverty affects civil and political rights, focusing on the criminal justice system, welfare, healthcare, political participation barriers, homelessness, and basic social rights including housing, water, and sanitation. The investigation coincided with a November 2017 report revealing a hookworm outbreak in Alabama, a disease associated with extreme poverty.

During his November 2017 U.S. investigation, Alston documented extreme poverty conditions including raw sewage flowing from homes in Butler County, Alabama, and visited Los Angeles's Skid Row, which he described as "50 blocks of concentrated human humiliation." His investigation spanned areas in California, Alabama, Georgia, Puerto Rico, Washington D.C., and West Virginia, coinciding with reports of hookworm—a disease of extreme poverty previously thought eradicated in the 1930s—reemerging in Alabama.

In autumn 2018, Alston conducted a two-week fact-finding tour of the United Kingdom, meeting and speaking with people living in poverty, and concluding that nearly half of the nation's children living in poverty was "a disgrace" and "social calamity," criticizing the government's approach as "radical social re-engineering" rather than sound economics, and warning that the poor should not bear the largest burden of Brexit's financial costs.

Alston concluded that UK austerity measures caused "great misery" with approximately 14 million people (one in five) experiencing poverty and 1.5 million unable to afford basic essentials, citing evidence of increased food bank use, homelessness, and predictions of child poverty potentially reaching 40% by 2022. He stated the government had abandoned compassion and dismantled key parts of the postwar social contract established by William Beveridge over 70 years ago.

As special rapporteur on extreme poverty and human rights, he received support from the New York University School of law which received to this end several grants from the Ford Foundation and the Open Society Foundations.

=== Other ===
Alston also directed a project funded by the European Commission, which resulted in the publication of a Human Rights Agenda for the European Union for the Year 2000 and a 1999 volume of essays (The European Union and Human Rights). Many of its recommendations were subsequently implemented by the European Commission and the European Council. He also is one of 29 signatories to the Yogyakarta Principles.

Alston was appointed an Officer of the Order of Australia for "distinguished service to the law, particularly in the area of international human rights, and to legal education" in the 2021 Queen's Birthday Honours.

== Publications ==
Alston has written on issues such as economic, social and cultural rights, United Nations institutions and procedures, labour rights, the role of non-state actors in relation to human rights, comparative bills of rights, the use of force, and human rights and development policies. He is also one of the authors of a textbook in the field entitled International Human Rights in Context, Law, Politics, Morals, published by Oxford University Press. A third edition was published in 2007.

In a 2017 article in the Journal of Human Rights Practice, faced with the rise of populism, Alston called for a reframing of "economic and social rights as human rights rather than as welfare or development objectives." He also called on academics, those who are anti- and pro- human rights, to pay attention to the "unintended consequences of their scholarship."

His 2019 article with Bassam Khawaja and Rebecca Riddell, "Much Ado About Poverty," provided a behind the scenes account of the role of a UN Special Rapporteur, "in investigating and evaluating the situation of people in poverty in a wide range of countries."
