= Climate Whistleblowers =

International climate whistleblower NGO

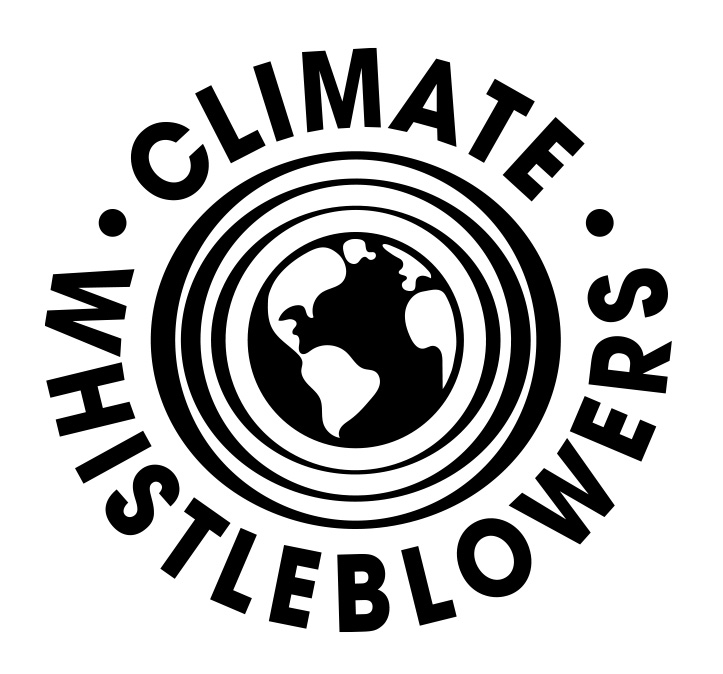
- Abbreviation: CW
- Formation: June 2023
- Founder: Gabriel Bourdon-Fattal and Henri Thulliez
- Location: Paris, France
- Official language: English, French, Spanish
- Website: https://www.climatewhistleblowers.org/

Climate Whistleblowers (CW) is a non-profit organisation founded in 2023 with the aim of protecting and supporting whistleblowers who have information about practices that exacerbate the climate crisis. Since 2023, Climate Whistleblowers has supported whistleblowers responsible for several revelations: Unrestricted about the practices of KTM, GreenFakes about the practices of environmental auditing firms or Polina Zabrodskaya's story about greenwashing in the advertising industry.

== Protecting climate whistleblowers ==
Climate Whistleblowers champions the idea that even an isolated whistleblowing can have a significant impact. It believes that, with specialised support, the emergence of a new generation of climate whistleblowers could generate significant changes in the fight against climate change. However, reporting can be dangerous, and these people may be subject to retaliation. For this reason, Climate Whistleblowers seeks to protect them (physically, financially, legally, in the media, and psychologically). Beyond this support, Climate Whistleblowers seeks to maximise the impact of the revelations in the hope of putting an end to the reported practices.

== International reach ==
Climate Whistleblowers is an organisation that operates on an international scale. Its boards of directors and strategic boards are made up of lawyers, activists, scientists and journalists from various countries around the world. Among them are, for example, the American scientist Peter Kalmus, the French economist Lucas Chancel and the Mexican lawyer Alejandra Ancheita. Its headquarters are located in Paris, as France has an ambitious regulatory framework for the protection of whistleblowers and the organisations that support them. It is closely linked to the Platform for the Protection of Whistleblowers in Africa (PPLAAF).

== Climate Whistleblowers-backed disclosures ==
=== Unrestricted ===
Unrestricted is an investigation published on 26 May 2026 by several major European media outlets on a controversy surrounding the production and sale of enduro motorcycles by Austrian company KTM. The consortium of print and television journalists, coordinated by Climate Whistleblowers (CW), comprises Le Monde, Paper Trail Media, L'Espresso, El País, Der Standard, Der Spiegel, Österreichischer Rundfunk (ORF), DeSmog, the Centre for Climate Reporting, and ZDF Frontal.

==== Context ====
KTM, a subsidiary of the Indian group Bajaj Auto Limited, is one of the world's leading motorcycle manufacturers, recognised for its enduro models and competition motorcycles. Enduro motorcycles are dual-use vehicles type-approved for use on both road and off-road terrain. They are subject to strict homologation standards setting precise thresholds for engine output, pollutant emissions and noise levels. European legislation strictly regulates the de-restriction of motorcycles to limit pollutant emissions and noise nuisance.

==== Findings ====
According to the investigation conducted by Climate Whistleblowers and its partners, KTM is accused of facilitating the de-restriction of an entire range of its enduro motorcycles intended for sale. These modifications would increase pollutant emissions and noise levels and would have serious consequences for public health and the environment. An independent study commissioned by the International Council on Clean Transportation shows that a de-restricted motorcycle emits pollutants and generates noise at levels considerably exceeding the legal limits in force. Dealers would provide buyers with registration documents and papers certifying the regulatory compliance of the vehicles, despite the modifications carried out.

==== The role of Climate Whistleblowers ====
Climate Whistleblowers played a central role in receiving and evaluating the disclosures of a whistleblower. After verifying the accuracy of the disclosures, the organisation formed a European consortium of investigative media outlets and coordinated an in-depth investigation over a period of more than one year to prove the systematic nature of the methods denounced by the whistleblower.

==== Research method ====
The whistleblower's disclosures were accompanied by undercover videos filmed at official KTM dealerships and at a motor show in Europe. Independent technical analyses, commissioned by the ICCT, made it possible to quantify the extent of the noise and air pollution generated by the motorcycles. The media consortium also exercised KTM's right of reply and consulted the European authorities to gather their comments before the publication of the articles and reports.

==== Reactions and Responses ====
KTM was contacted by the media consortium and provided a statement on the 50 questions put to it, explaining that all its enduro models leave the factory in full compliance with European road regulations and duly type-approved. KTM also stated that its sustainability reporting process complies with applicable standards. Following the publication of the investigation, the group publicly declared that the articles were based on a "misunderstanding" of the way in which modern enduro motorcycles are marketed and used.

The European Commission, also contacted, responded by emphasising that any modification affecting the compliance of a vehicle may give rise to corrective measures. It called on national authorities to conduct thorough investigations and to take enforcement action if violations were confirmed.

Marie Toussaint, Member of the European Parliament for the Greens–EFA group interviewed by the consortium, stated that the findings are "extremely serious" and reflect a persistent tendency among certain manufacturers to treat European regulations as obstacles to circumvent rather than as limits to respect.

Austrian Green MEP and environmental activist Lena Schilling commented on the investigation in a press release: "If these allegations are confirmed, this would be nothing less than a new emissions scandal, but this time on two wheels. Ten years after Dieselgate, this should be clear: anyone who systematically circumvents emissions rules endangers health, the climate and the trust people place in them. It would be difficult to explain that a group would benefit from a share of €1.8 million in European solidarity funding, while circumventing European environmental rules. Benefiting from EU funds and ignoring EU rules — that must not be tolerated. It is unacceptable for companies to place their profits above the law, while health, clean air and a future worth living recede into the background."

==== Issues Raised ====
Unrestricted highlighted several systemic failings. The case first reveals the inadequacy of the oversight mechanisms of national and European authorities, which allows manufacturers to circumvent homologation standards while remaining below the radar. The investigation also raises broader questions about compliance with environmental standards by the automotive and motorcycle industry.

Unrestricted bears similarities with the Dieselgate affair, in that it concerns the alleged use of techniques enabling compliant emissions to be displayed during homologation processes, while maintaining pollution levels above the standards under real-world conditions of use.

=== Dawn Meats incinerator case ===
The Dawn Meats case concerns an environmental dispute in Ireland over an animal by-product incinerator project promoted by the agri-food company Dawn Meats in Ballyhaunis, County Mayo. The case rose to prominence in 2024 following revelations showing that the incinerator's predicted sulfur dioxide emissions could exceed legal limits set by the European Union.

==== Context ====
Dawn Meats, one of Europe's leading meat suppliers, proposed the construction of an incinerator to treat animal waste, in particular in response to the inability to export this waste to the UK after Brexit. The facility was to produce energy for the Ballyhaunis plant. In this context, the Irish Environmental Protection Agency (EPA) granted an authorisation in 2024, setting an emission limit of 50 mg/m³ of sulfur dioxide SO2.

==== Revelations about planned broadcasts ====
According to internal documents obtained by Climate Whistleblowers and made public by SourceMaterial and The Irish Times, the Spanish company Valfortec, which designed the incinerator, had estimated emissions at approximately 80 mg/m³ of SO2. Therefore, this estimate is significantly higher than the regulatory limit and the declarations made to the authorities. These revelations have raised the question of a possible breach of European air pollution standards.

==== Consequences and reactions ====
Following the publication of this information, the EPA announced that it would review the license granted to ensure that the emission limits meet the strictest European standards.

==== Issues raised and the role of Climate Whistleblowers ====
Climate Whistleblowers collected and transmitted internal documents to the media, highlighting the potential risks to public health and the environment arising from exceeding regulatory thresholds for industrial emissions.

=== The GreenFakes case ===
The GreenFakes case is a journalistic investigation revealed in February 2025 by a consortium of media outlets that includes Mediapart, Africa Uncensored and Mongabay, in collaboration with Climate Whistleblowers. The research brings to light collusion between certain environmental consulting firms and multinational corporations, intending to conduct biased environmental audits to facilitate environmentally destructive industrial projects.

==== Context ====
The name "GreenFakes" refers to the falsification or manipulation of environmental assessments. The case reveals how these practices allow companies to obtain financing or permits more easily, especially for projects in Africa, while concealing or minimising the negative impacts of these projects on biodiversity.

==== Actors and projects involved ====
Among the consulting firms mentioned are the French Biotope and the British The Biodiversity Consultancy. Its clients included several multinationals such as TotalEnergies, Eiffage, Rio Tinto and Chanel, involved in projects in Uganda, Mozambique, Guinea, Ivory Coast and Madagascar. The audit reports in question often acknowledged the ecological richness of the areas studied and the risks to biodiversity, but proposed mitigation measures deemed insufficient or even inapplicable. In some cases, the recommended measures were subject to the explicit agreement of the sponsor, which limited any real commitment to environmental protection within the projects' scope.

==== The role of Climate Whistleblowers ====
In the GreenFakes case, Climate Whistleblowers played a central role in collecting and analysing hundreds of internal documents from research firms; coordinating research work with several independent media outlets; and ensuring the safety and anonymity of whistleblowers.

==== Research method ====
The revelations are based on an internal set of documents (contracts, reports, correspondence) supplemented by field research, interviews with local communities, OSINT analysis and the use of satellite imagery to corroborate the findings.

==== Issues raised ====
The case has highlighted structural failures in the environmental audit sector, underscoring the absence of independent regulation and control. Climate Whistleblowers and the media involved consider that these practices contribute to a phenomenon of "permission to destroy" the environment, granted to industrialists, despite their stated commitments to ecological responsibility.

=== The case of Polina Zabrodskaya ===
Polina Zabrodskaya's case concerns litigation between the former creative partner of the British advertising agency AMV BBDO and her former employer, in relation to accusations of greenwashing and retaliation. It is supported by Climate Whistleblowers.

==== Context ====
Polina Zabrodskaya, originally from the heavily polluted Tula Oblast in Russia, joined AMV BBDO to work on international advertising campaigns, particularly for the Galaxy and Sheba brands, owned by Mars Inc.. These campaigns highlighted environmental and sustainability commitments, particularly through third-party certifications such as Rainforest Alliance and the Marine Stewardship Council (MSC). However, her personal investigations revealed serious problems in the supply chains of these brands, including child labor in cocoa farming and environmentally destructive fishing practices. In this context, she claims that certifications used to validate AMV BBDO's advertising campaigns were misleading.

==== Revelations and alleged retaliation ====
After raising her concerns internally, Zabrodskaya says she was progressively removed from her responsibilities, excluded from meetings, and criticised for her attitude. Eventually, she was suspended. Considering that her warnings were ignored, she left AMV BBDO in 2024.

==== Judicial proceedings ====
In 2025, Zabrodskaya initiated proceedings before a labour court, alleging unfair dismissal and retaliation for raising the alarm within the company. She was supported by the law firms Equal Justice Solicitors and Doughty Street Chambers. At the same time, thanks to the support of Climate Whistleblowers, among others, she decided to sound the alarm publicly. His story has been the subject of an article in the Financial Times as well as a more personal interview for DeSmog.

==== Issues raised ====
This case highlights the role of advertising agencies in the dissemination of environmental messages by companies, as well as the risks of greenwashing when these messages are based on controversial or unrealistic data or certifications. It also raises the issue of whistleblower protection in the advertising sector.

== Funding ==
Climate Whistleblowers receives funding from the Tides Foundation, Broad Reach Foundation, the Open Society Foundations and OLIN.

== Partners ==
Climate Whistleblowers has collaborated with various organisations from several countries, such as the associations Notre Affaire à Tous and Friends of the Earth – France, investigative journalism organisations such as The Bureau of Investigative Journalism (TBIJ), Global Witness, or the International Consortium of Investigative Journalists (ICIJ). legal organisations such as the Human Rights Law Centre or Protect, or, finally, organisations specialising in whistleblowing, such as the Whistleblowing International Network (WIN) or the Maison des Lanceurs d'Alerte (MLA).
