= Sizani =

Sizani is a South African name. Notable people with the name include:

- Sizani Dlamini-Dubazana, South African politician
- Sizani Ngubane (1946–2020), South African rural women's rights activist
- Stone Sizani (born 1954), South African politician
