= Soltan Achilova =

Turkmen documentary photojournalist and human rights whistleblower

- Born: c. 1950
- Occupations: photographer and journalist
- Known for: Reporting on human rights abuses in Turkmenistan

Gurban Soltan Achilova (Turkmen: Soltan Açylowa; born c. 1949), sometimes spelled Gurbansoltan Achilova, is a Turkmenistani photojournalist. She was a nominee for the Martin Ennals Award for Human Rights Defenders in 2021. She has been reported as the only openly critical journalist in Turkmenistan. Her country is described as an "information black hole", with an evaluated political freedoms index far lower than that of North Korea.

== Personal life ==
Achilova was born in 1948, 1949 or 1950. By 1979 she and her husband had four children and the family lived in a house they owned in Ashgabat, the capital of Turkmenistan. Her husband died in the 1990s.

== Career ==
While Achilova was out of her house one day in March 2006, workers arrived without notice to demolish her family's home. The police assisted in the family's eviction and the authorities offered no compensation for their loss. She contacted the courts and the chief prosecutor's office, but all she found were similar cases of injustice. She became a journalist, using her camera to document her findings. She has no access at home to the internet.

She has contributed to Chronicles of Turkmenistan, a media outlet in exile, and is a former correspondent of Radio Free Europe/Radio Liberty's Turkmen service, Azatlyk Radiosy. As of 2017, she was Azatlyk Radiosy's main contributor of photos and media from inside Turkmenistan. That year, she covered the country's preparation for the 2017 Asian Indoor and Martial Arts Games. In 2019, she was a contributor to the opposition website Khronika Turkmenistana (hronikatm.com), which was started in 2006.

Achilova has been reported as the only openly critical journalist in Turkmenistan. She operates a web site in a country where access to the internet is restricted. As of 2021, she had 30,000 visits to the site. She reports on the human rights abuses in her country. She says that she has been hoping for improvement for 30 years but it does not get better. She says that people who campaign for human rights are watched and they are subject to not only arrest but pressure is also applied to members of their family.

Achilova investigations and photographs contributed to an investigations by the Turkmen Helsinki Foundation for Human Rights and Human Rights Watch on housing rights violations in Ashgabat.

She was shortlisted for the 2021 Martin Ennals Award for Human Rights Defenders together with Loujain al-Hathloul from Saudi Arabia and Yu Wensheng from China. That year's award was given to Yu, who was serving a four-year sentence in China. Achilova was the only one of the nominees who was able to address the ceremony, as she sent a pre-recorded video. Achilova could not attend in person because of the COVID-19 pandemic restrictions and her runner-up award was not collected.

=== Interactions with authorities ===
In January 2008, Achilova was questioned for two days regarding reports she had written that were "critical of national policy".

In December 2014, Achilova was questioned by police while taking photographs for a story on the government ordering the price of fresh meat be lowered.

On October 25, 2016, Achilova was arrested by police and told to delete her photographs. She was assaulted by unknown individuals later that evening and on November 8.

In July 2017, Achilova received death threats from a police officer who was tailing her.

In May 2018, Achilova was detained while traveling to photograph a Victory Day commemoration event. Police threatened to charge her with drug possession if she did not delete her photographs, and also requested that she publicly denounce her work for Azatlyk Radiosy.

In 2019, she was prevented from leaving the country to go to a seminar in Georgia. Enquiries by the Committee to Protect Journalists about why she had been prevented from travelling were not replied to.

In November 2023, Achilova was prevented from attending that year's Martin Ennals Award ceremony in Geneva. She was held by the authorities in Turkmenistan when she and her daughter tried to leave on 17 November. She was questioned and strip searched twice, but no charges were brought against her. The nominal reason given by the border staff for preventing her leaving the country was that their passports were invalid. Commentators concluded that authorities were trying to prevent Achilova from further highlighting the country's injustices. She was expecting to meet people from the Office of the United Nations High Commissioner for Human Rights and had been invited to speak at the University of Geneva during their human rights week.

In November 2024, authorities attempted to poison Achilova, and subsequently forcibly hospitalized to prevent her from leaving the country. During this six-day forced hospitalization, she was unable to contact her family.
