= Manguinhos, Rio de Janeiro =

Manguinhos
- Neighborhood
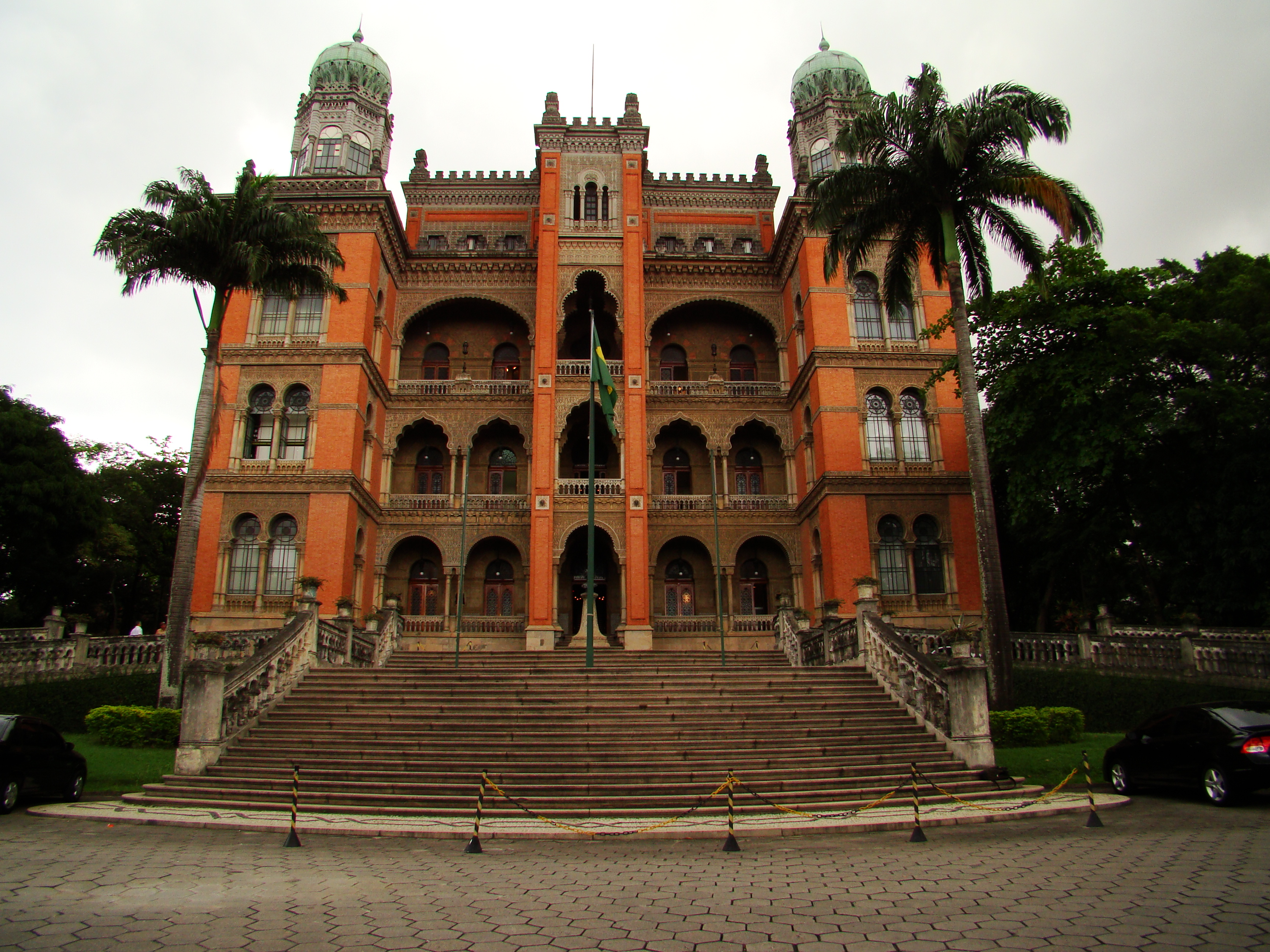

- Location in Rio de Janeiro Manguinhos (Brazil)
- Coordinates: 22°52′44″S 43°14′43″W
- Country: Brazil
- State: Rio de Janeiro (RJ)
- Municipality/City: Rio de Janeiro
- Zone: North Zone

Population (2022)
  - Total: 28,855
- Website: Brazil Language

Manguinhos is a neighborhood in the North Zone of Rio de Janeiro, Brazil.

== Notable residents ==
- Ana Paula Gomes de Oliveira (born 1976), human rights activist.
