= Moʻtabar Tojiboyeva =

Uzbekistani journalist

Moʻtabar Tojiboyeva Мўтабар Тожибоева
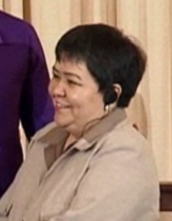
- Tojiboyeva in 2009
- Born: Moʻtabar Tojiboyeva Ibragimovna; August 25, 1962 (age 64); Margilan, Fergana, USSR, USSR
- Occupation: Journalist
- Writing career
- Subject: Human rights defender
- Notable awards: Martin Ennals Award 2008, U.S. State Department "Women of Courage" 2009

Moʻtabar Tojiboyeva Ibragimovna (Uzbek Cyrillic: Мўтабар Тожибоева; born 25 August 1962) is an Uzbek independent journalist and human rights activist. She is a founder of the International Human Rights Organization "Fiery Hearts Club". Tojiboyeva monitored human rights implementation and carried out journalist investigations. She participated in investigative actions and judicial trials as a defense counsel and authorized representative in Uzbekistan.

Tojiboyeva is also a founder of the Popular Movement "Civil Society". She was arrested on 7 October 2005 just before leaving to Dublin where she was due to attend an international conference on human rights protection. Tojiboyeva was accused in breaching the 18 articles of the Criminal Code of the Republic of Uzbekistan. She was convicted on 13 counts and sentenced to 8 years in prison for criticizing the Uzbek government for having used violence against the participants of the peaceful demonstration in Andijan in 2005.

In 2005, the international organization PeaceWomen Across the Globe under the Nobel Committee included Tojiboyeva's name to the list of 1000 women peace activists, thus making her the official nominee for the Nobel Peace Prize.

On May 15, 2008, when she was still in prison, Tojiboyeva was awarded with the Martin Ennals Award. The same day the bloggers who wrote about human rights announced a top 10 list of the women who had played the most significant role in human rights protection. Tojiboyeva was among them. On July 2, 2008, Tojiboyeva was released. The Martin Ennals Award Ceremony was held in Geneva on November 20, 2008. For the 60th anniversary of the Universal Declaration of Human Rights, the "Fiery Hearts Club" was awarded with the French Republic's "Liberty, Equality, Fraternity" Prize. On December 10, 2008, Tojiboyeva was awarded with the same prize during the ceremony in Paris.

In March 2009, Tojiboyeva received the International Women of Courage Award established by the State Department of the USA. Later she returned the award because of her own principles. In August she became a member of the International Council of the Human Rights Found. In 2011, Tojiboyeva appeared in the list of the ten most influential women in Central Asia. In 2011 she wrote a book "Prisoner of Torture Island". In the book, Tojiboyeva shares her memories and tells about the atrocities of the Uzbek government over its people. The book will be translated into English, Russian, French and Uzbek.

Tojiboyeva is now a political refugee and lives in Île-de-France. At present she is at the head of the International Human Rights Organization "Fiery Hearts", registered and based in Paris.

== Biography ==
Tojiboyeva was born on August 25, 1962, in Margilan, Ferghana region, into a workers' family. Her father is Ibrohim Tojiboyev, her mother – Kandolathon Uljayeva. In 1937 Uljaboy Khamrakulov, her maternal grandfather, was declared public enemy and exiled to Siberia with his family. Since then he had been being transferred all over the Soviet Union. In 1946 for having served in the ranks of partisans against the German invaders he was rehabilitated by the Soviet government and returned to the homeland. During World War II, Kandolathon Uljayeva met her future husband in Ukraine. Ibrohim Tojiboyev was a soldier of the Soviet Army. They married in 1944 and their first son was born in Ukraine. Although Tojiboyeva was not eyewitness of those events, her mother's memories played a significant role in her maturing as a human rights defender.

== Education ==
In 1969, Tojiboyeva entered the school No.7 in Margilan named after Khamzy. From 1987 to 1989 she studied by correspondence in Margilan technical secondary school of economic planning and was conferred a diploma in economics. At the same time she completed journalism courses under the Press department of Fergana Region.

== Working activity ==
After graduation in 1979, Tojiboyeva had worked as a spinner at the Margilan filature for one year. In 1980, she started working as an assistant at a State notary office in Akhunbabayevsky district. In 1981 Tojiboyeva got an office secretary job in the District Department of Agriculture. In 1985, she continued her labor activity as an inspector at the Public Control Committee of the Republic of Uzbekistan. At the same time, on a voluntary basis, Tojiboyeva was in charge of the complaint department and the press centre of the institution in question. Within this organization she took an active part in monitoring the implementation of laws and human rights. There, for the first time, Tojiboyeva personally saw the efficiency of public relations. As a designated employee of the press centre, she also took an active part in agitation and propaganda activities concerning the implementation of laws approved by the Uzbek government. Tojiboyeva started to declaim against the executives abusing their authority and rights of simple citizens in the central and local press. This work influenced in a significant way on her maturing as a human rights activist. In 1991, as a result of the dissolution of the Soviet Union, the Public Control Committee was dissolved as well. And till 1997, Tojiboyeva continued her activity in the banking industry, including the position of the Head of Human Resources, the economist of currency circulation department, the Chief economist at the Industrial and Construction Bank of Uzbekistan and the Public bank of Kirguliysky district. From 1997 to 1998, she headed agitation and propaganda centre of the Union of Writers of Ferghana district. Tojiboyeva published her first brochure "Memory". At the same time she continued her human rights activity and issued her critical materials in the republican media. From 1998 to 1999, Tojiboyeva held an appointment as a Deputy Head of Department of Ferghana region at the International Red Cross and Red Crescent Movement.

== Human rights activity ==
In the elections in December 1999, Tojiboyeva was a candidate for deputy to the Regional Council of Fergana. She pursued bringing to the agenda the passage of the law concerning the organization of public control of the legislative acts implementation. However, Tojiboyeva failed to break through in the elections. For realization of her plans she became a member of the People's Democratic Party of Uzbekistan (PDPU). In January 2000, Tojiboyeva was elected secretary of the PDPU party unit of Margilan called "Zukhro". There she founded the "Fiery Hearts Club". The event can be considered as her official entry to the human rights field. With the support of the "Fiery Hearts Club"a brochure called "Let Us Be Vigilant" was published in 2001. In January 2002, at the plenary session of the municipal council of Margilan two-year activity of the "Fiery Hearts Club" was discussed. The plenum positively appreciated the club's progresses in crime and drug abuse fighting and adopted a resolution on popularization the club's practices throughout the Republic. Subsequently, articles, feature stories, special reports about the club's activity were issued in the local and republican media.

== Alimuhammad Mamadaliev's case and its consequences ==
In 2002, Tojiboyeva was monitoring the case of Alimuhammad Mamadaliev, tortured and killed by special services. She took an active part in informing a wide public about the drama. As a result, the case was examined by the Military Court of the Republic of Uzbekistan. Merders of Mamadaliev were convicted to heavy terms of imprisonment. On June 30, 2002, Tojiboyeva together with Scott Peterson, a correspondent of the international newspaper "Christian Science Monitor", visited Durmen village, where Mamadaliev's family lived. They were carrying out journalistic investigation and questioning villagers about local administrative authorities' threats. The next day, on July 1, 2002, traffic police of Kirgulijsky district pulled over Tojiboyeva's car and arrested her. They grilled and humbled Tojiboyeva without formal procedure. She was brought to the department of internal affairs and placed in a basement cell. That night internal affairs officers raped her. The next day Tojiboyeva was accused in breaching the articles "Failure to obey order or regulation issued by a police officer" and "Disorderly conduct". Due to the lack of accusatory documents presented to the court as well as Tojiboyeva's claims to arrange medico-legal assessment, the case was transferred to the Public Prosecutor's Office and she was released from the courtroom. On September 5, 2002, the Criminal Court of Fergana region recognized illegal the actions of Kirgulijsky district officers. On September 27, the Public Prosecutor's Office of Kirgulijsky district initiated criminal proceedings. However, on December 16, 2002, the case was dismissed "in the absence of crime in the acts of the officers".

Mamadaliev's case aggravated the confrontation between Tojiboyeva and the authorities. Due to that event, the "Fiery Hearts Club" and its leader gained even higher authority among people and that caused the increase in their activity.

== Aggravation of the situation ==
On October 14, 2002, on Tojiboyeva's initiative there was held a picket in front of the Crime Court of Alty-Aryksky district. On November 7, 2002, she made public an official demand on behalf of the "Fiery Hearts Club", for the manifestation that was going to be held on November 8 in front of the building of the Parliament against the violation of citizens' constitutional rights. She sent her leaflet to all the administrative authorities. The Prosecutor General's Office executive Bakhadyr Pulatov came to Ferghana region to check the arguments of the demand and met Tojiboyeva. However, he didn't complete the inspection and left for Tashkent. FOUR days before the demonstration Tojiboyeva was summoned to the prosecutor of Ferghana Talib Khasanov who insisted on the demonstration to be cancelled otherwise he threatened to initiate criminal proceedings against Tojiboyeva and delivered her a warning letter. When Tojiboyeva refused the letter the prosecutor send her the second warning. The document warned her against continuation of the "Fiery Hearts Club" activity otherwise another criminal case would be initiated against her. On December 5, 2002, Tojiboyeva got a call from the Ferghana region Department of internal affairs. She was informed about legal proceedings initiated, but didn't present herself in the court. On December 6, Tojiboyeva was informed that she had to present herself in the court, otherwise it would be done by enforcement. After making sure the case had been faked-up against the planned demonstration, Tojiboyeva decided not to present herself in the court and hid in Durmen. The same evening police officers, special services and militaries surrounded Durmen. They explained to the villagers that Tojiboyeva was a western agent and demanded her extradition. However, nobody supported the public officers, so they started conducting a search. On December 10, 2002, Tojiboyeva found out that aiming to bring pressure on her, the police officers were planning to take her daughter hostage. So disguised as an old woman Tojiboyeva left the village. Then she called to the Internal Affairs Department of Ferghana region and expressed her will to succumb to the authorities in return of abatement of persecution and pressure.

== Car accident ==
At the beginning of December 2003, one of high officials of the Internal Affairs Department of Ferghana region called Tojiboyeva in sozzled state and told her that she would be punished for her actions and that her days had been already numbered. On December 12, Tojiboyeva came to the Ministry of Interior of the Republic of Uzbekistan and demanded the abatement of persecution against her. However, the agency's chief executives refused to receive her. The next day on her way to Ferghana region Tojiboyeva had a car accident and spent 12 days in hospital. According to Tojiboyeva, that was not a simple accident as she was the only victim and it happened after the phone call with threats. As the car accident took place in Tashkent region, Tojiboyeva was taken to the hospital in Akhangaransky district. The victim wasn't informed about the results of criminal proceedings initiated over the accident. Her demands to see the documents concerning the case were not satisfied. Tojiboyeva came back to Margilan and continued medical treatment there. Later she got to know that her medical papers had been destroyed by fire of unknown origin.

== Andijan events ==
On April 4, 2005, Tojiboyeva sent a telegram to the President of the Republic of Uzbekistan Islam Karimov on behalf of the "Fiery Hearts Club" expounding a difficult socio-political situation in Andijan region. On April 13, she was detained by police officers of Bektemirsky district, later transferred to the Internal Affairs Department and interrogated. Under the pressure of international NGOs as well as foreign embassies, Tojiboyeva was released. On April 15, 2005, in the Ministry of Internal of the Republic of Uzbekistan there was held a press conference concerning published under the pseudonym of the political scientist Safar Abdulaev. Tojiboyeva wanted to participate in the conference, but on her way to the conference, she was stopped by traffic police and taken away by unknown individuals in another car. After having changed several cars, she was brought to the Internal Affairs Department of Bektemirsky district. There Tojiboyeva was subject to a stern interrogation and humiliation. Back to Tojiboyeva got under medical treatment in a local hospital, however she didn't turn to anybody concerning the violences and tortures that she had undergone. That was because the high official that was in charge of Tojiboyeva's detention as well as mockery at her, told her to keep silence, otherwise he threatened to make her daughter experience the same adventure as hers. During the events in Andijan on May 13, 2005, Tojiboyeva was placed under house arrest for no reason. There were two armed police officers watching her dwelling. In such conditions, Tojiboyeva achieved to relate the participants of Andijan events with international journalists. The same day at about 5 pm, chief executives of the Counter-Terrorism Department under the Internal Affairs Department of Ferghana region ordered to transfer Tojiboyeva to the regional Internal Affairs Department. She was detained till May 16, 2005 and prohibited to contact with anybody.

== Arrest ==
During the legal proceedings concerning the Andijan events initiated on September 20, 2005, the Deputy Solicitor General of the Republic accused Tojiboyeva of anti-government activity under the false name of a human rights activist. Tojiboyeva was invited to an international conference on human rights protection in Dublin fixed on October 8, 2005. She was expected to make a speech at the conference on the Andijan events. However, on October 7, 2005, Tojiboyeva was arrested by security officers of the Ministry of Interior of Uzbekistan on a charge of deceptive practices. After the arrest the house of Tojiboyeva was searched and her personal affairs were confiscated. Despite the fact that only Tojiboyeva in person was incriminated, the members of the "Fiery Hearts Club" were searched as well, besides all the documents and materials (videotapes, audio cassettes, etc.) were confiscated too. For 10 days, Tojiboyeva was being detained in temporary detention facilities of Ferghana region. Later on, she was kept in other pretrial detention facilities for 4 months and underwent numerous interrogations. During the investigation, Tojiboyeva had finally learnt the reasons of her arrest. It was human rights activity against the interests of administrative officials and the "Fiery Hearts Club's" governing.
