= Sizani Ngubane =

South African activist (1946–2020)

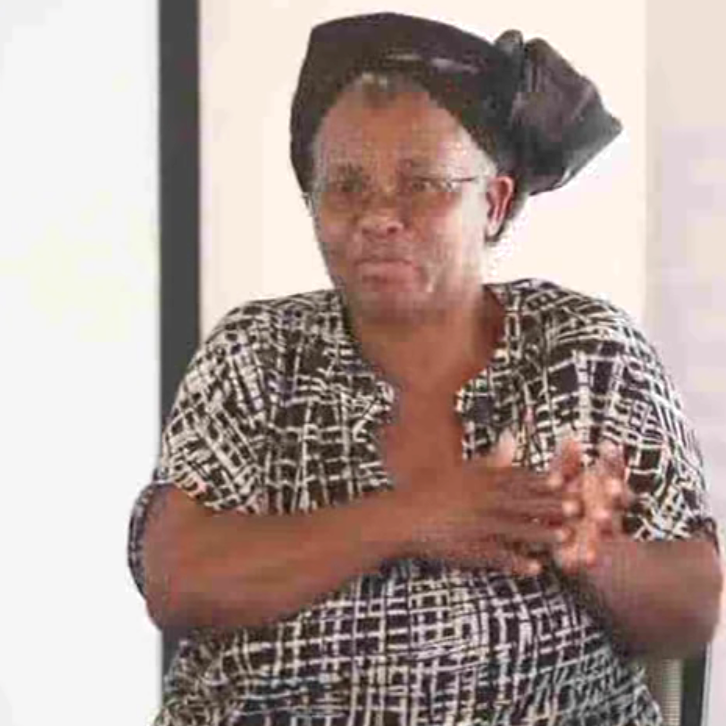
- in 2014
- Born: 24 November 1946
- Died: 23 December 2020 (aged 74)
- Known for: [Rural Women's Movement]

Sizani Ngubane was a South African activist who worked for rural women's rights. She was the founder of the Rural Women's Movement (RWM) which originated in her peace-building efforts in the final years of minority-rule wherein she brought women together across partisan lines to end political violence. RWM was formally registered in 1998. Working on issues central to its constituency, rural women and girls, RWM would come to number over 50,000 members across KwaZulu-Natal. The movement works both at the grassroots and policy levels on issues including women's access to land rights, ending gender-based violence, promoting food sovereignty and fostering healthy, democratic rural communities. Sizani Ngubane was recognized for her work as the 2018 NGO CSW Woman of Distinction and as a 2020 finalist for the Martin Ennals award.

== Biography ==
Ngubane was born in KwaMpumuza, near Pietermaritzburg. As a young girl, Ngubane witnessed her mother experiencing domestic violence from her male relatives and her own husband. In 1965, her mother had been kicked off of her own land by her brothers in law and went to a traditional leader to request land where she was denied because she had no sons. Ngubane said, "I grew up knowing I had to be part of the solution."

Sizane Ngubane speaking at SACSIS event about rural land reform.

In 1990, Ngubane launched the Rural Women's Movement (RWM).

From 1999 on, she began to research how women were treated in rural KwaZulu Natal and she found that many were treated "as subordinates to men." She also began fighting against the Traditional Courts Bill which she felt would give traditional, male leaders unchecked power that could "significantly undermine women's rights." The Bill died in 2014.

In 2011, Ngubane addressed the United Nations on issues facing rural women.

In 2020 she was nominated for the Martin Ennals Award together with Yemeni lawyer Huda Al-Sarari and Norma Librada Ledezma. Huda Al-Sarari became the 2020 laureate

She died on 23 December 2020 of COVID-19.
