= Mohamed Zaree =

- Born: 13 August 1980 (age 45)
- Education: Faculty of Law Cairo University
- Employer: Cairo Institute for Human Rights Studies
- Known for: human rights activism

Mohamed Zaree (born 13 August 1980) is an Egyptian human rights activist. He is the Egypt country director for the Cairo Institute for Human Rights Studies (CIHRS) and the leader of the Forum of Independent Egyptian Human Rights NGOs. He was the recipient of the 2017 Martin Ennals Award for Human Rights Defenders. He was not allowed by the Egyptian government to collect his award and he is currently banned from leaving the country by the Egyptian government.

Zaree attended Cairo University, where he obtained a Bachelor's Degree from the Faculty of Law in 2002 and a graduate diploma in Civil Society and Human Rights in 2004. He Joined CIHRS in July 2011. He has two daughters.
