= Martin Ennals Award for Human Rights Defenders =

Humanitarian award

The Martin Ennals Award for Human Rights Defenders, sometimes called "the Nobel Prize for human rights", is an annual prize for human rights defenders. It was created in 1993 to honour and protect individuals around the world who demonstrate exceptional courage in defending and promoting human rights. Its principal aim is to provide protection ("protective publicity") to human rights defenders who are at risk by focusing international media attention on their plight, mainly through online means and advocacy work. The Award is named after British human rights activist Martin Ennals, former secretary general of Amnesty International and a Nobel Peace Prize laureate.

The Award carries an important financial prize intended to support the Award winners' work in the field of human rights. The Award ceremony, co-hosted with the City of Geneva, takes place in the second semester of the year. The Jury, composed of representatives of ten of the world's leading human rights organisations, selects the Award winner each year. Members of the jury include Amnesty International, Human Rights Watch, International Federation of Human Rights, World Organisation Against Torture, Front Line Defenders, International Commission of Jurists, Human Rights First, International Service for Human Rights, Brot für die Welt, and Huridocs.

== Recipients ==
Year	Name
1994	Harry Wu (China/United States)
1995	Asma Jahangir (Pakistan)
1996	Clement Nwankwo (Nigeria)
1997	Samuel Ruiz Garcia (Mexico)
1998	Eyad El Sarraj (Palestine)
1999	Nataša Kandić (Yugoslavia)
2000	Immaculée Birhaheka (Democratic Republic of the Congo)
2001	Peace Brigades International (Colombia)
2002	Jacqueline Moudeina (Chad)
2003	Alirio Uribe Muñoz (Colombia)
2004	Lidia Yusupova (Russia)
2005	Aktham Naisse (Syria)
2006	Akbar Ganji (Iran) and Arnold Tsunga (Zimbabwe)
2007	Rajan Hoole, Kopalasingham Sritharan (both Sri Lanka) and Pierre Claver Mbonimpa (Burundi)
2008	Mutabar Tadjibaeva (Uzbekistan)
2009	Emadeddin Baghi (Iran)
2010	Muhannad Al-Hassani (Syria)
2011	Kasha Jacqueline Nabagesera (Uganda)
2012	Luon Sovath (Cambodia)
2013:	Joint Mobile Group (Russia)
2014	Alejandra Ancheita (Mexico)
2015	Ahmed Mansoor (United Arab Emirates)
2016	Ilham Tohti (China)
2017	Mohamed Zaree (Egypt)
2019	Abdul Aziz Muhamat (Sudan)
2020	Huda Al-Sarari (Yemen)
2021	Yu Wensheng (China)
2022	Phạm Đoan Trang (Vietnam), Dr. Daouda Diallo (Burkina Faso), Abdul-Hadi Al-Khawaja (Bahrain)
2023	Feliciano Reyna (Venezuela), Delphine Djiraibe (Chad), and Khurram Parvez (India)
2024	Zholia Parsi (Afghanistan), Manuchehr Kholiqnazarov (Tajikistan)
2025:	Ana Paula Gomes de Oliveira (Brazil)

The award was in the news in November 2023 when Solton Achilova was prevented from attending that years ceremony by the authorities in Turkmenistan. She was a critic of her country's government and she had been a runner-up for the 2021 award. She had been unable to attend in 2021 because of the COVID-19 pandemic and she had planned to pick up the award in 2023. No reason was given by the authorities for preventing her leaving the country.
