= Chadian Association for the Promotion and Defense of Human Rights =

Human rights organization operating in Chad

The Association Tchadienne pour la Promotion et la Défense des Droits de l'Homme or Chadian Association for the Promotion and Defence of Human Rights (abbreviated as ATDPH or ATPDH) is a human rights organization operating in Chad. According to group co-founder Delphine Djiraibe, following the rebellion by Idriss Déby that overthrew the dictatorship of Hissène Habré in 1990, she and several colleagues returned to Chad from abroad and saw widespread starvation and poverty among the people. The event motivated them to found the ATDPH to prevent similar suffering in the future.

== Report on use of child soldiers ==
ATPDH president and lawyer Jacqueline Moudeina accuses the current Chadian government of forcing minors into the Chadian military and using them "as human shields ... We have lots of information to back this up, including testimony from witnesses who have managed to escape... There's absolutely no doubt [young men] are being sent to the war zone." Moudeina alleges that the child soldiers are sent to military barracks in Bourkou-Ennedi-Tibesti in northern Chad, or Moussoro, 94 miles north of the Chadian capital city N'Djamena, and then to the Chadian-Sudanese border to fight in the current Chad-Sudan conflict to make up for the mass desertions of army officers who are joining the United Front for Democratic Change rebel alliance.

The UFDC wishes to overthrow the current administration of Chadian President Idriss Déby and to hold "fair and free elections" after a two-year interim period. Chadian Minister for Public Security Routouang Yoma Golom said Déby is reinforcing the army due to the desertions and that the arrests of over 300 "Colombians," a derogatory term meaning "street urchin," was a separate matter. Golom told reporters that the "people who the police rounded up are delinquents who could not be looked after by their parents. By no means do the police or us want to use force to send Chadians into the army. Everyone recruited so far has been a volunteer."

== Government crackdown ==
On June 11, 2005, Moudeina was injured when 100 women, who were nonviolently protesting voting irregularities in the reelection of President Déby outside the French embassy in N'Djamena, were violently attacked by police who used beatings and tear gas to put down the demonstration. The women had hoped to give the French ambassador a petition demanding new elections.

== Recognition ==
In 2004, the Robert F. Kennedy Center for Justice and Human Rights presented Djiraibe the Robert F. Kennedy Human Rights Award for her work with the group, praising "her tireless efforts in promoting the human rights of the Chadian people, often at great personal risk to herself and her family."
