= Estácio de Sá University =

University in Rio de Janeiro, Brazil

Estácio de Sá University, or Universidade Estácio de Sá (UNESA) is a private university founded in 1970 in Rio de Janeiro, Brazil. It has 39 campuses spread throughout the state of Rio de Janeiro, with the Tom Jobim Campus being the main one and responsible for the university's administration. As one of the largest private university in Brazil, it is also known for its high rate of student complaints and dissatisfaction.

It is named after the Portuguese knight and military officer Estácio de Sá (1520–1567), who was the founder of the city of Rio de Janeiro.

== Notable alumni ==
- Ana Paula Gomes de Oliveira (born 1976), human rights activist.
