= Alejandra Ancheita =

Mexican lawyer

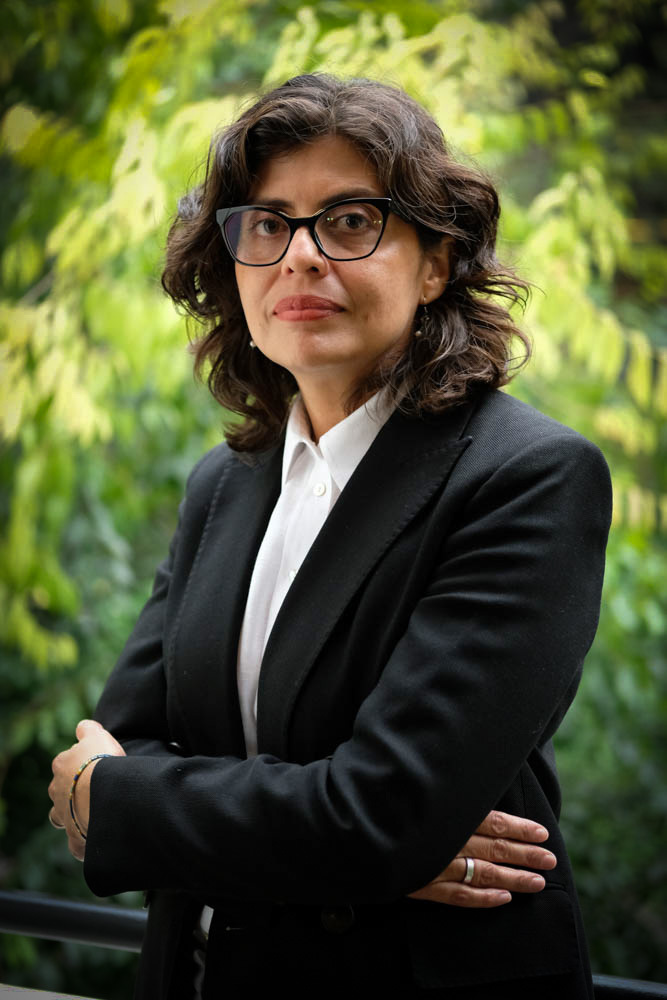
- Ancheita in 2021
- Occupation: Human rights lawyer
- Years active: 1990's - present
- Known for: Martin Ennals Award for Human Rights Defenders-laureate 2014

Alejandra Constanza Ancheita is a Mexican human rights lawyer, working in the field since the 1990s. She was the 2014 recipient of the Martin Ennals Award for Human Rights Defenders.

== Background ==
Ancheita lost her father at a young age.

Ancheita holds a master's degree in International Law and Global Justice at Fordham University.

== Career ==
Ancheita founded Proyecto de Derechos Económicos, Sociales y Culturales A.C. (ProDESC), an NGO which focuses on economic, social and cultural rights.

In 2013, Alejandra received the Wasserstein Public Interest Award from Harvard Law School.

She has spoken in various international forums, such as the United Nations' Forum on Business and Human Rights, the Women's Forum for the Economy and Society and the OECD Annual Meeting of National Contact Points, as well as arguing cases before the Inter-American Commission on Human Rights and national courts.

She has worked with Universidad Iberoamericana Ciudad de México and Universidad Autónoma Metropolitana, Mexico. She has been a member of the European Center for Constitutional and Human Rights (ECCHR)'s advisory board. She has sat on the Oxford University Press's Journal of Human Rights Practice's advisory board. She sits on Global Labor Justice's IRLF Board of Directors.
