= Chad–Cameroon Petroleum Development and Pipeline Project =

Pipeline Project

The Chad–Cameroon Petroleum Development and Pipeline Project was a controversial project to develop the production capacity of oilfields near Doba in southern Chad, and to create 1,070-kilometre (660 mi) pipeline to transport the oil to a floating storage and offloading vessel (2°54′7″N 9°47′35″E), anchored off the coast of Cameroon, near the city of Kribi.

The project started as a joint venture among ExxonMobil (40%), Petronas (35%), Chevron (25%), and the governments of Cameroon and Chad which hold a combined a combined 3% in the pipeline portion of the project. Construction of the pipeline began in 2000 and was completed in 2003. In 2014, Chevron sold its stake in the project to the Chadian government. In December 2022, ExxonMobil sold its shares to UK-based firm Savannah Energy, but Chad challenged the deal. The case is now before the International Chamber of Commerce in Paris. In May 2023, Petronas sold its shares to the state-owned oil company Société des Hydrocarbures du Tchad.

The project was largely funded by multilateral and bilateral credit financing provided by Western governments. The International Finance Corporation (IFC), the private-sector arm of the World Bank, provided $100 million of debt-based financing, and France's export credit agency COFACE and the U.S. Export-Import Bank each provided $200 million; private lenders coordinated by the IFC provided an additional $100 million.

The pipeline continues to transport Chadian crude to the offshore Kome Kribi 1 floating storage and offloading facility for export. Capacity is roughly 225,000–250,000 barrels per day.Businessincameroon

Cameroon collects a transit fee (currently $1.321 per barrel; a further review was scheduled for October 2023 but no public update on a new rate is available). Between 2020 and 2025, Cameroon earned 222.2 billion FCFA (~$380 million) in transit fees, averaging about 37 billion FCFA per year—significantly higher than the early years of operation.

In early 2026, revenues remained solid: ~12.2 billion FCFA in the first four months (from ~16.1 million barrels) and 15.1 billion FCFA by the end of May.

Businessincameroon

== Background ==
The original consortium of oil companies involved in the pipeline project were Exxon, Royal Dutch Shell, and Elf Aquitaine. Negotiations started in 1988, with Chad and a consortium of oil companies signing a 30-year oil concession in the southern Chad region of Doba.

In 1996, Chad and Cameroon signed a treaty for the construction of a pipeline.

In 1999, Royal Dutch Shell and Elf Aquitaine dropped the project due to controversies surrounding the project and volatile oil prices. As a result, Exxon opened the project up for bid to a select few corporations and in April 2000, Petronas of Malaysia and Chevron acquired stakes in the project. Exxon then enlisted the support of the World Bank to raise support within the international community. The World Bank agreed on the condition that certain environmental and social standards were enforced both in Chad and Cameroon, and that the revenues be put towards improving social and economic conditions.

== Participants ==
=== Chad ===
As of 2021, oil exploitation potential is estimated at 1.5 billion barrels.

The Tchad Oil Transportation Company (TOTCO) manages the pipeline within Chad. TOTCO is incorporated in Tchad, and is a joint venture between Chad and the private sponsors.

=== Cameroon ===
The portion of the pipeline owned by Cameroon is managed by the Cameroon Oil Transportation Company (COTCO). This company is incorporated in Cameroon, and is a joint venture between the governments of Cameroon and Chad, and the private sponsors.

=== World Bank ===
While the project's private sponsors provided about 95% ($2.2 billion) of the financing for the pipeline, the World Bank also contributed through debt financing. The IFC provided a loan of about $100 million, $85.8 million of which went to COTCO and $14.2 million of which went to TOTCO. The IFC also helped secure an additional $300 million in private commercial lending. The International Bank for Reconstruction and Development (IBRD) provided $92.9 million to Chad ($39.5 million) and Cameroon ($53.4 million) to finance the joint-venture pipeline companies. The World Bank-provided financing was given through the European Investment Bank, which provided $46.6 million to finance Cameroon and Chad's equity in COTCO and TOTCO.

Included in plans for the project was a revenue management law developed by the World Bank. This separated the oil revenues given to Chad into four required areas: a Future Generations Fund, health, education and other development projects, a fund to compensate the Doba region of Chad from where the oil was extracted and government reserves. The revenue management law also created the Petroleum Revenue Oversight Committee, which oversees how the oil revenues are spent, and includes members of both the Chadian government and civil society.

On September 5, 2008, Chad fully prepaid both the IBRD and IDA components of the World Bank loan totaling $65.7 million from its "national coffers swollen by more than $1 billion a year in oil revenues". This ended the bank's involvement in the project. The World Bank noted that, "over the years, Chad failed to comply with key requirements of this agreement", including devoting a substantial portion of the oil revenues to poverty reduction programs, and thus it "concluded that it could not continue to support this project under these circumstances".

== Controversy ==
The pipeline project has been affected by persistent charges and fears about corruption and the diversion of revenues ostensibly intended for poverty reduction towards arms purchases, particularly by the regime of Chadian President Idriss Déby. Delphine Djiraibe, a human rights attorney who became one of the leading critics of these arms purchases, was later awarded the 2004 Robert F. Kennedy Human Rights Award for her work against the project.

Chadian opposition leader and parliamentarian Ngarledjy Yorongar of the Front of Action Forces for the Republic (FAR) accused National Assembly President Wadal Abdelkader Kamougue of taking a bribe from Elf, then a partner in the project, in 1997. Yorongar was stripped of his parliamentary immunity and detained for nine months. In November 2000, the World Bank announced that $4 million of a $25 million signing bonus from the oil companies was spent by the Chadian government on weapons. The World Bank required tight restrictions on oil revenues as a condition of its loans. In January 2006, Chad moved to unilaterally increase the portion of oil revenues going to its general fund from 15 to 30 percent.

On 28 August 2006, President Déby ordered Chevron and Petronas to quit the country.

=== Environmental impacts ===
In Chad and especially Cameroon, through which the pipeline stretches 890 km of the total 1,070 km, there have been claims of adverse effects of the construction and maintenance of the pipeline on indigenous communities and the environment. One of the largest areas affected is near the Cameroonian coastal town of Kribi. Located 18 kilometres (11 mi) off the coast of Kribi is the export terminal facility. There has been much controversy regarding the alleged degradation the coastal reefs during construction. This has not only impacted the underwater habitat, but also the livelihoods of the local people who depend on fishing as their main source of income.

Since completion of the pipeline in 2003, there have been two known oil leaks at the transfer site off the shore of Cameroon. The first occurred on January 15, 2007. Representatives for COTCO claimed that the leak was contained within a few hours and that the amount of spilled was not sufficient to cause any harm, though local fishermen did claim to have seen traces of the oil ashore. The second oil spill was on April 22, 2010, at the same site. COTCO stated that the leaked oil amounted to less than five barrels. Cameroonian NGOs Relufa and Centre pour l'Environnement et le Développement have brought to light the inefficiencies of the oil-spill preparedness plan, as well as the lack of communication between COTCO and the surrounding communities.

== International involvement ==
=== Non-governmental institutions ===
Non-governmental organizations have played a large role in mediating the concerns of the international community with the needs of the indigenous communities of Chad and Cameroon. Even before construction commenced on the pipeline project in 2000, international and local NGOs were monitoring the situation and meeting with representatives from the World Bank and the consortium of gasoline companies. After the completion of the project, NGOs were also very involved with documentation of any problems and worked in conjunction with external independent monitoring agencies.

In 2005, under the direction of the World Bank's International Advisory Group, a group of stakeholders including COTCO, the CPSP and multiple NGOs created a platform under which complaints registered with the World Bank by organizations and individuals could be resolved. According to FOCARFE (Fondation Camerounaise d'Actions Rationalisees et de Formation sur l'Environnement), more than 300 civil society complaints existed by the close of construction in 2003.

In November 2006, the stakeholders involved in the project came together to discuss their views, main issues and concerns for a Forum of Information on the Chad-Cameroon Pipeline Project. The stakeholders involved were the Cameroon Oil Transportation Company (COTCO), the Comité de Pilotage et de Suivi des Pipelines (Pipelines Steering and Monitoring Committee) and a group of four Cameroonian NGOs: CED (Centre pour l'Environnement et le Developpement), RELUFA (Reseau de Lutte contra le Faim), CARFAD (African Center for Applied Forestry Research and Development) and FOCARFE (Fondation Camerounaise d'Actions Rationalisees et de Formation sur l'Environnement). The meeting was held to discuss a wide array of topics, including the monitoring of the pipeline activities, environmental and social compensation plans, CAPECE's capacity building objectives and the involvement of NGOs.

- Environmental Defense
- Friends of the Earth

Friends of the Earth is a transnational grassroots environmental network. The organization brings together and mobilizes social and environmental advocacy groups from all over the world to rally behind certain issues. While FOE has been involved in documentation and monitoring of pipeline project since its construction, the organization more recently developed a report in 2008 condemning a World Bank initiative for "New Climate Funds". Along with four other advocacy organizations, FOE stated that the World Bank had repeatedly engaged in projects, such as the Chad-Cameroon pipeline, that actually negatively affected the environment and only added to pollution.

- Centre pour L'Environnement et le Developpement

The Center for Environment and Development is a Cameroon-based NGO founded and run by native lawyer Samuel Nguiffo. The CED's main purpose is to advocate and campaign against the "liquidation of the regions forests for short-term profit". Certain exploitations within the Cameroon region include logging, hunting for bushmeat, mining for natural resources and the construction of the Chad-Cameroon pipeline. The CED works to inform local communities about their rights to land and community forest concessions, as well as constant documentation and publications to educate the international community.

- RELUFA: Réseau de Lutte contre la Faim
- CARFAD (African Center for Applied Forestry Research and Development)
- FOCARFE (Fondation Camerounaise d'Actions Rationalisées et de Formation sur l'Environnement)
- Catholic Relief Services

Catholic Relief Services, an international nonprofit humanitarian organization, has been one of the key watchdogs in the pipeline project, even before construction was completed. In a statement made in October 2003, they stated their concerns for the people and environment of both Chad and Cameroon, and anticipated negative effects of the pipeline for the future. One of their main concerns for the project was the potential mismanagement of profit funds by Chad and Cameroon, as well as the ineffectiveness of policies mandated by the World Bank.

The Cameroon Chad Pipeline Monitoring Project is an initiative created by CRS that supports the efforts of Cameroonian NGOs as they advocate for proper use of profits from the pipeline, as well as the communities and environment surrounding the pipeline. One of the main efforts of the Catholic Relief Services has been to review and correct compensation packages received by those located along the pipeline, as well as advocating for fair salaries for local workers contracted by the oil companies.

== See also ==
- Economy of Chad
- Economy of Cameroon
- Petroleum industry in Chad
