= Jacqueline Moudeina =

Chadian lawyer and human rights activist

- Born: Jacqueline Moudeina; 1957 (age 68–69); Chad
- Education: Master's degree in Private Law
- Known for: Human Rights Defense
- Awards: Right Livelihood Award

Jacqueline Moudeina (born 1957) is a Chadian lawyer and human rights activist, who is known for her work in bringing Hissène Habré to justice for crimes against humanity, as well as those who worked with him.

== Biography ==
Jacqueline Moudeina was born and raised in Chad; however in 1979 after civil war broke out in the country, she quit her study of English at the University of Chad and fled to the Congo with her husband. They lived there for over 13 years before returning. While there, she received a master's degree in Private Law at the University of Brazzaville.

She returned to Chad in 1995, after the reign of terror that occurred during Hissène Habré's stint as president. She registered as a legal intern, and was one of the first women to have done so. She was then promoted to legal secretary, then by 2004 she was made the president of the Chadian Association for the Promotion and Defense of Human Rights. During this ten-year period, she began accumulating evidence of the atrocities committed by Habré and his affiliates.

On February 23, 2001, while Moudeina was participating in a peaceful demonstration in front of the French Embassy to denounce irregularities that occurred during the presidential elections, the Chief Police Commissioner Mahamat Wakaye ordered the dispersion of the demonstration through the use of force. Moudeina was wounded by a grenade during the event, and spent over a year in France recovering from her injuries. According to witness testimonies, Wakaye ordered the targeting of Moudeina during the attack.

== Habré's trial ==
In 1982 Hissène Habré took power through a coup d’état. Moudeina filed her first case against Habré in 2000, while he was living comfortably in the Republic of Senegal, on behalf of seven women. The judge of the case indicted him for complicity in the acts of torture and barbarity. However, a year later the judge threw out the case saying it was out of Senegalese jurisdiction. Moudeina and the victims in turn filed the case in Belgium, because a law exists there that any person who committed acts of torture anywhere in the world could be indicted and tried.

On May 30, 2016, Hissène Habré was convicted to life imprisonment. After five years of deliberation; the Belgium judge charged Habré with war crimes, crimes against humanity, and genocide. An international arrest warrant was then placed on him, and extradition from Senegal was requested. He was arrested and detained for ten days, but the Senegalese prosecutor declared himself incompetent to follow through with the request. The Senegalese President called the case an African issue, and moved to put it before the African Union.

In 2005, the African Union asked Senegal to prosecute Habré in the name of Africa, declaring that no African head of state should be tried outside of Africa. However, 6 years Senegal declared that it would not stage a trial against him. Moudeina is now attempting to extradite him through other international channels. In 2013 a court in Senegal ordered the arrest of Habre.

== Awards ==
She was awarded the Martin Ennals Award for Human Rights Defenders in 2002. She became president of the Chadian Association for the Promotion and Defense of Human Rights (ATPDH) in 2004. She was awarded the Right Livelihood Award in 2011 for "her tireless efforts at great personal risk to win justice for the victims of the former dictatorship in Chad and to increase awareness and observance of human rights in Africa".

== See also ==
- First women lawyers around the world
