= 218TV =

Libyan satellite TV channel

- Country: Libya
- Headquarters: Amman, Jordan

Programming
- Language: Arabic

Ownership
- Key people: Huda El-Sarari, Mujahid Bosifi
- Sister channels: 218 News

History
- Launched: August 6, 2015

Links
- Website: www.218tv.net

218TV was a Libyan free-to-air satellite channel founded in 2015 in Amman, Jordan. The channel provides several news broadcasts along with various social and entertainment shows.

== History ==
The channel was founded on 6 August 2015 by the Libyan Women's rights activist Huda El-Sarari and her husband Mujahid Bosifi, a former anti-Gaddafi activist who lived in the Netherlands.

In late 2017, sister channel 218 News was launched.

218TV was said to be the most popular in Libya in 2019 when Huda El-Sarari was recognised for her influence in the Arab world in 2019 by "Arabian Business" magazine. In 2022 March, Ali Al-Rifawi a reporter working for the channel was kidnapped by militias. He was released in July 2022. The station ceased operations in 2022.

== Programming ==
- US-L: weekly program focusing on Libya–United States relations
- Interview: weekly program
- Amazighi in Arabic: weekly program focusing on Berber culture in Libya
- Subh (The Morning): daily morning program
- Ashia (The Evening): daily entertainment program
- Game: weekly sports show
- Sponda
- Up To Tech

== Frequency ==
- Nilesat V 12398
- 27.500 FEC 5/6
