= Ana Paula Gomes de Oliveira =

Brazilian human rights activist (born 1976)

- Born: 9 October 1976 (age 49); Manguinhos, Rio de Janeiro, Brazil
- Education: Estácio de Sá University
- Occupation: Human rights activist
- Years active: 2014–present
- Organization: Mães de Manguinhos
- Known for: Campaigning against police brutality and institutional racism in Brazil
- Children: 2
- Awards: Martin Ennals Award for Human Rights Defenders (2025)

Ana Paula Gomes de Oliveira (born 9 October 1976) is a Brazilian human rights activist. Following the death of her son in 2014 as a result of police brutality, she co-founded Mães de Manguinhos, an organisation supporting the families of victims of state violence and institutional racism. In 2025, Oliveira received the Martin Ennals Award for Human Rights Defenders in recognition of her activism.

== Personal life ==
Oliveira was born on 9 October 1976 in Manguinhos, a favela in the North Zone of Rio de Janeiro. She is the eldest of four children born to Maria José Gomes de Oliveira and José Isídio de Oliveira Filho. Her grandparents had been forcibly relocated to Manguinhos from Caju in 1956. In 1977 during the military dictatorship in Brazil, Oliveira's parents were arbitrarily detained and tortured by police officers for two days. When Oliveira was a child, her uncle and cousin both died as a result of violence; her uncle was stabbed to death while in prison, while her cousin was shot dead by police officers.

In 1994, Oliveira had her first son, Johnatha. After finding employment at a daycare centre, she started studying pedagogy in Méier, though she was forced to drop out after losing her job. By 2005, Oliveira had married and had a second child, Maria Paula; that same year, she graduated with a degree from Estácio de Sá University. Shortly afterwards, her husband was shot in the knee and permanently disabled by military police while drinking at a bar.

== Activism ==
=== Murder of son and investigation (2014–2024) ===
On 14 May 2014, a clash occurred between the Pacifying Police Unit and demonstrators in Manguinhos who were protesting against ongoing police violence in the favela. Officers were reported to have been shooting indiscriminately into the crowd; Oliveira's son Johnatha, who was reported to have been either walking to or from his girlfriend's home, was shot seven times in the back, and died of his injuries. He was one of 580 people killed by the police in Brazil in 2014, of whom 79% were black.

Shortly following Johnatha's death, the police and local media erroneously reported that he had been a known criminal operating in Manguinhos. A member of the Pacifying Police Unit, Alessandro Marcelino de Souza, was identified as making the shots that killed Johnatha. Souza initially denied being present during the shooting, though later contradicted this in statements provided in 2016 when he acknowledged being at the scene.

In 2018, a jury trial was ordered at the Third Jury Court of Rio de Janeiro. In 2024, the jury agreed with the prosecutor to reduce the charges against Souza from premeditated murder to manslaughter without intent to kill. Following this, the Public Defender's Office of Rio de Janeiro filed an appeal for Souza to be charged with intentional homicide. A new trial remains pending as of 2024.

=== Establishment of Mães de Manguinhos and subsequent activism (2014–present) ===
In the immediate aftermath, Oliveira was supported by Marielle Franco, then a member of the Legislative Assembly of Rio de Janeiro's Human Rights Commission. Oliveira was introduced to other mothers of children killed by Brazilian police officers in the area; they subsequently co-founded Mães de Manguinhos (lit. 'Mothers of Manguinhos'). The organisation, comprising largely of black women from favelas whose children or other relatives had been killed as a result of police brutality or state violence, called for the remembrance of, and justice for, victims, as well as accountability.

Through Mães de Manguinhos, Oliveira campaigned for greater awareness and addressing of issues of police violence and institutional racism in Manguinhos and other favelas in Rio de Janeiro, including incidents of murder, arbitrary detention, and racially-motivated violence, from municipal, state and legislative bodies. Oliveira has also called for greater state support for victims and their families, and communities impacted by violence.

In addition to her work with Mães de Manguinhos, Oliveira has worked for the national coalition of state violence activist groups, the Rede de Atenção a Pessoas Afetadas pela Violência de Estado (lit. 'Network for Supporting Victims of State Violence'). This has included providing psychological support for families of victims of police brutality, and lobbying for legislative reforms to address systemic racism and provide comprehensive emotional and practical support for victims of violence. Oliveira is also part of the Global Initiative Against Transnational Organised Crime, where she works as an analyst for its Assassination Witness project, documenting attacks linked to organised crime.

Oliveira has described Brazilian state institutions as being racist and intent on "separating Black mothers from their children" through murder, incarceration, and forced disappearances. She has described systemic racism as being present both in the police as well as the judiciary and in all levels of local, state and national government. Oliveira said that "the military dictatorship ended for the middle class and for artists... in the favela, it never ended", referencing the ongoing presence of military police in favelas. Following Operation Containment, a 2025 series of police raids in Rio de Janeiro which led to the deaths of 121 people, she publicly called for the urgent establishment of legal mechanisms to regulate and ensure transparency concerning police operations in favelas.

== Recognition ==
Oliveira's story was one of 15 featured in the book Mães em Luta (lit. 'Mothers in Struggle'), published in 2016 by Ponte and Mães de Maio, about women who lost family members to police violence.

In 2025, Oliveira received the Martin Ennals Award for Human Rights Defenders, the first Brazilian to win the award. The panel's chair, Hans Thoolen, stated that "the racist violence that plagues the streets of Brazil deserves the full attention of the federal government and the international community" and praised Oliveira's activism following her son's death. She dedicated her award for her son and Franco, who was murdered by police in 2018. She also called on the United Nations to pressure the Brazilian government to address state-sanctioned violence.
