= Delphine Djiraibe =

Chadian attorney

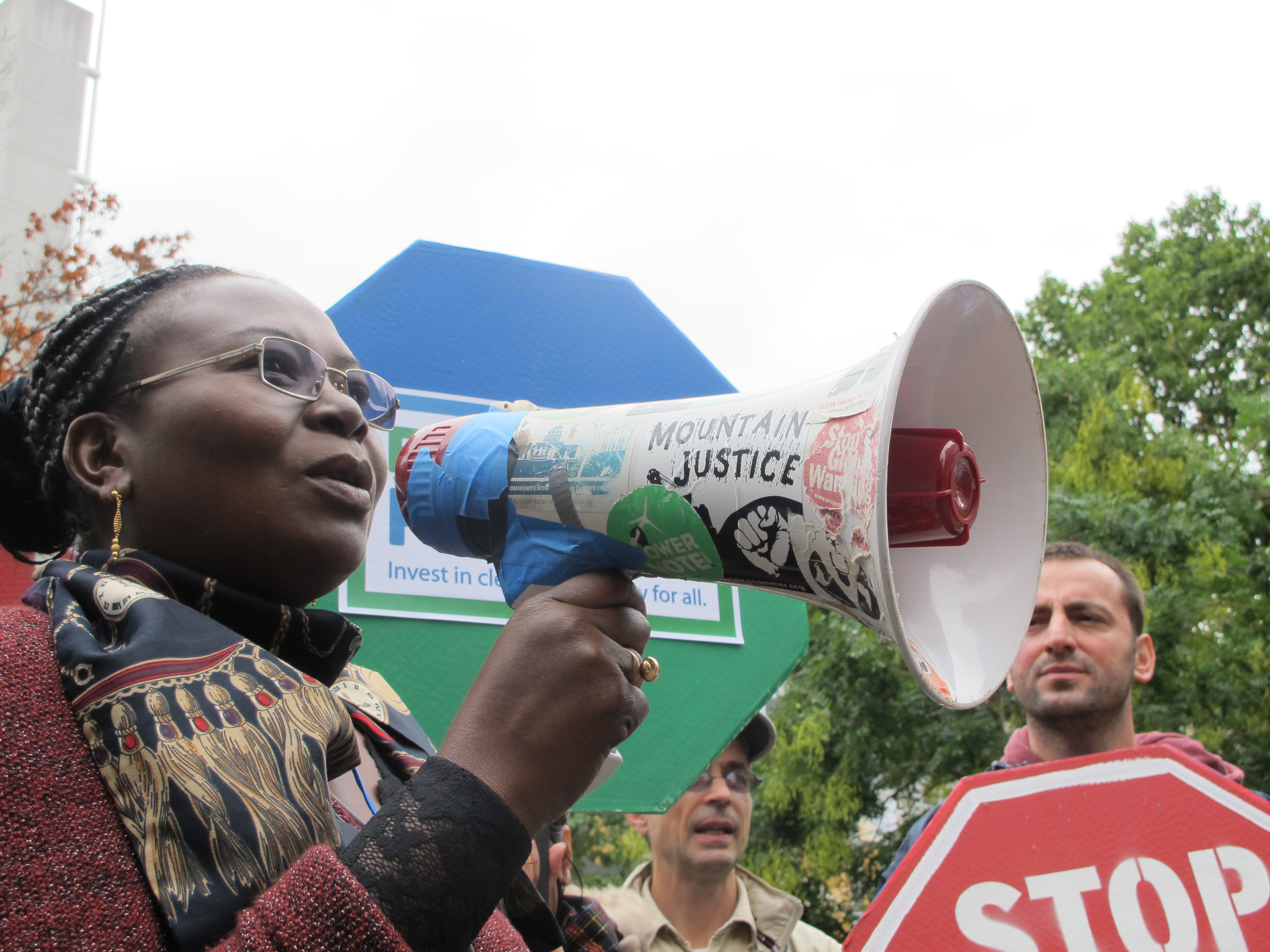
- Delphine Djiraibe
- Born: December 1, 1960 (age 65); Koumra, Chad
- Occupation: Lawyer
- Organization: Chadian Association for the Promotion and Defense of Human Rights
- Awards: Robert F. Kennedy Human Rights Award (2004)

Delphine Djiraibe (born 1 December 1960) is a Chadian attorney and co-founder of the Chadian Association for the Promotion and Defense of Human Rights.In 2006 she also founded the Public Interest Law Center (PILC). BBC News has described her as "one of Chad's most prominent human rights lawyers".

In 2004, she was awarded the Robert F. Kennedy Human Rights Award for her work.

== Early life and education ==
Djiraibe was born on 1 December 1960 in Koumra, Chad. She completed a bachelor's degree in Moundou and a degree in law at the Marien Ngouabi University in 1989.

== Background ==
In the final years of the dictatorship of Hissène Habré, Djiraibe was studying law in Congo Brazzaville. After Habré was overthrown in a rebellion by Idriss Déby in 1990, Djiraibe returned to Chad and saw widespread starvation and poverty among the people. The event motivated her to become a human rights activist and found the Chadian Association for the Promotion and Defense of Human Rights.

== Human rights work ==
Djiraibe's work particularly focuses on revenues from the World Bank-funded Chad–Cameroon Petroleum Development and Pipeline Project. Djiraibe argues that revenue from the pipeline should be used to support local development rather than the Chadian military, and that the pipeline project further impoverished the villages of its region: "Their lands have been taken for the oil project. They get compensation but without preparation. The cash that they have received has been expended like that and now they find themselves with nothing." Djiraibe also has argued that oil revenues were a factor in the nation's 2005-2010 civil war, calling them a "curse".

According to the Robert F. Kennedy Center for Justice and Human Rights, Djiraibe's activism caused the Chadian government to begin a public relations campaign against her. Djiraibe decisively lobbied the World Bank to provide restrictions on the Chadian government spending oil revenue. In 2008, during a widespread crackdown by Deby on his political opponents, a campaign began to guarantee Djiraibe safe passage out of Chad. She was ultimately allowed to travel to Paris.

Djiraibe was a critic of the Organisation of African Unity, calling it "irrelevant" and "a private club for friends". She supported the 2005 trial of former president Habré, stating that the case showed "that Africa can also play a role in the fight for human rights and can fight on its own soil."

== Recognition ==
In 2005, the Robert F. Kennedy Center awarded Djiraibe the Robert F. Kennedy Human Rights Award, praising "her tireless efforts in promoting the human rights of the Chadian people, often at great personal risk to herself and her family."

Four years later, the magazine Jeune Afrique named her one of Africa's 100 most important advocates for change, writing, "This attorney and tireless fighter for human rights has the obstinacy of those who call out in the desert. In 2009, will she be heard?"

== See also ==
- First women lawyers around the world
