= Huda Al-Sarari =

Yemeni human rights lawyer

Huda Al Sarari
- Born: c. 1978
- Occupation: lawyer
- Known for: exposing the operation of secret prisons by foreign governments in Yemen

Huda El-Sarari or Hoda El-Sarari; Hoda Al Sarari (Arabic: هدى الصراري; born c. 1978) is a Yemeni human rights lawyer. She was awarded the Martin Ennals Award for exposing secret prisons operating by foreign governments in Yemen, which led to the release of 260 people from unlawful detention.

== Life ==
Huda El-Sarari graduated with a law degree and later completed a master's in Women's Studies at Aden University in 2011. She later began working to challenge human rights abuses, collaborating with the Yemeni Women’s Union, the Adala Foundation for Rights and Freedoms, and the National Committee to Investigate Allegations of Human Rights Violations.

In 2015, Huda El-Sarari contacted Amnesty International and Human Rights Watch after discovering that people were being detained and mistreated in jails organised by foreigners in Yemen. She was able to provide detailed information on 250 men and boys who had been imprisoned.

In 2016, she was contacted by mothers seeking information regarding their missing sons. Although she pursued the issue through the Yemeni courts, no information was produced. Using social media, she eventually uncovered the existence of prisons in Yemen that the judicial system was unaware of. In 2017, the story was revealed by the Associated Press, using much of her research to substantiate the report.

While over 2,000 people remain missing, she managed to form the "Union of Mothers of Abductees" and 260 prisoners have been released. In 2019, her son, Mohsen, was shot; he died in the hospital after a month in intensive care, after which she left her country. She believes that many Europeans and Americans do not realise that their governments are backing the UAE, which funds human rights abuses.

She was nominated for the Martin Ennals Award for Human Rights Defenders together with Sizani Ngubane of South Africa and Norma Librada Ledezma. She became the 2020 laureate in Geneva in February 2020.

== Awards ==
- Aurora Prize in 2019
- Martin Ennals Award in 2020
