= Huda El-Sarari =

Libyan journalist, poet and television executive

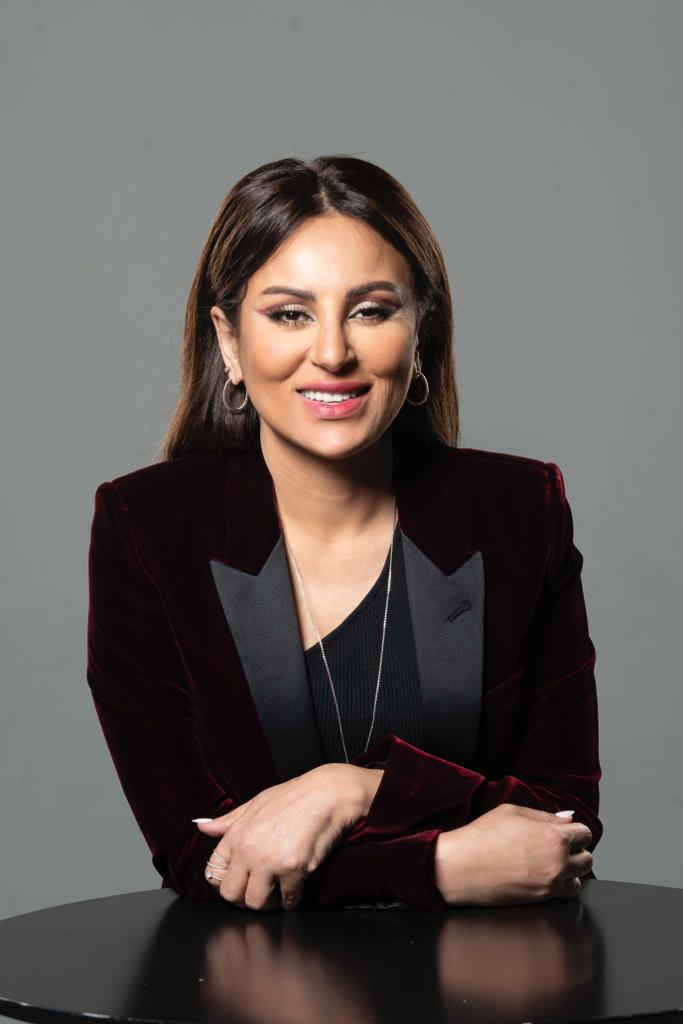
- Born: June 16, 1974 (age 51)
- Occupations: Journalist and TV executive
- Employer: 218TV
- Known for: Founding and running 218TV
- Spouse: Mujahid Al-Busaifi
- Children: two

Huda El-Sarari or Hoda El-Sarari; Hoda Al Sarari (born June 16, 1974) is a Libyan journalist, poet and television executive. She runs the 218TV channel, the "most popular", in Libya. She is said to be the first woman from Libya to gain a place in both the Arab and global rankings as one of the influential Arab personalities.

== Life ==
El-Sarari was born in 1974. She studied Business Administration.

In 2011, she was managing a TV channel in Libya that was funded by the UAE. She denied that the funders had any control of editorial content and said that the funding was due to altruism from fellow Arabs.

218TV became a popular TV station in part due to El-Sarari's journalism in 2014. The civil war was being fought, and most journalists were reporting on the deaths and the destroyed, but El-Sarari took a different approach. She concentrated on telling the story of how Libya and its population, rich in culture and history, were continuing their lives during the hostilities.

In 2017 she was given charge of her company's new channel 218News, which covered Libyan political events and Rimessa, which reported on sports news that was important to Libya.

In 2018 she proposed that women should be allowed four husbands now that DNA could identify the biological father of children, mirroring the laws that allowed men to have four wives, which is allowed under the civil status law of Islam. This caused a reaction on social media especially as Islamic law prevents women from marrying a second husband whilst the first is alive and married to her.

Her channel was said to be the most popular in Libya in 2019.

== Awards ==
She was the tenth person in 30 people chosen for their influence in the Arab world in 2019 by "Arabian Business" magazine. She was said to be the first woman from Libya to gain a place in both the Arab and global rankings as one of the influential Arab personalities.

== Private life ==
El-Sarari married the Libyan writer and journalist Mujahid Al-Busaifi in 2003. They had two children whom they brought up in the Netherlands whilst they were exiled for their opposition to the Libyan dictator Gaddafi. They later moved to Qatar.
