= Yu Wensheng =

Chinese lawyer and human rights activist

- 余文生
- Born: November 11, 1967 (age 58)
- Occupation: Human rights lawyer
- Spouse: Xu Yan
- Children: 1

Yu Wensheng (Chinese: 余文生; pinyin: Yú Wénshēng, born November 11, 1967) is a Chinese human rights lawyer based in Beijing. He is known for criticizing the Chinese Communist Party and taking up politically sensitive cases against the government. In 2019, he was secretly tried and imprisoned on a four-year sentence before being released in 2022. In April 2023, he and his wife were taken into custody and then transferred to Suzhou Detention Centre in 2024. In October 2024, he and his wife were sentenced to three years and one year and nine months in prison, respectively.

== Arrests and imprisonment ==
In 2014, Yu was detained due to his vocal support for Hong Kong's yellow umbrella movement. In 2017, Chinese judicial authorities refused to pass Yu's annual bar license review, which led to Yu's forced resignation from the Beijing Daoheng Law Firm. This inhibited Yu's ability to practice law as one must be employed by an established law firm. Yu then sought to establish his own law firm, whose application for registration was denied in January 2018. Subsequently, Yu's legal license was revoked on account of his not being employed by any law firm for six months.

On 18 January 2018, Yu published an open letter calling for reforms such as the holding of fair elections, advocating for an oversight system of the Chinese Communist Party, etc. The next day, Yu was arrested by over ten people, including a Swat team, while walking his 13 year-old son to school on suspicion of "picking quarrels and provoking troubles". Shanghai-based news website The Paper reported on 23 January 2018 that Yu had assaulted two police officers and resisted arrest. The report was widely circulated on news portals and social media in China. Yu's family and friends said that it was a coordinated effort to discredit Yu.

Since the arrest in 2018, Yu had been held in Residential Surveillance at a Designated Location (RSDL), where he was denied visits by his family and lawyer. In April 2019, the United Nations Working Group on Arbitrary Detention issued a statement calling for Yu's release. Yu's wife, Xu Yan, had commented that Yu's "proposal to amend the constitution and promote a reform in the political system [in China] was the main reason for his arrest [...] Now, human rights defenders don't dare to speak up any longer."

=== 2019: Four-year sentence ===
In May 2019, Yu was secretly tried without the knowledge of his family. He was secretly sentenced for four years on the charge of "inciting subversion of state power" in June 2020. The Xuzhou city intermediate people's court furthermore deprived Yu of his political rights for a period of three years, during which he would be barred from taking public positions, speaking publicly and publishing.

Yu then appealed his sentence, which was rejected by the Jiangsu Provincial People's High Court. According to Hong Kong news media RTHK, The People's High Court ruled on the grounds that Yu had "spread rumors and attempted to subvert state power by trying to overthrow the country's socialist regime".

In response to Yu's sentence, Nicholas Bequelin, director of Amnesty International's Asia-Pacific, commented that Yu's sentencing is “nothing but political persecution dressed up as legal process [...] The secret sentencing of yet another human rights lawyer marks a new low for what is left of the rule of law in China".

On January 19, 2020, the European Union denounced the court's decision and called for Yu's immediate release. Yu was released from prison on March 1, 2022.

=== 2023: Continued detention ===
On April 13, 2023, while en route to attending a meeting with the EU delegation to China in Beijing, Yu and his wife Xu were taken into police custody. They were later charged with "picking quarrels" and "inciting subversion of state power". Their son, who had turned 18 before their detention, lived under public security surveillance since, and suffered from medication overdose in November 2023. In January 2024, Yu and Xu were transferred to the 1000 km-away Suzhou Detention Centre.

On April 13, 2024, the first anniversary of Yu and Xu's arrest, 32 civil society organizations including Amnesty International, Freedom House and Human Rights Watch, issued a joint statement calling for the immediate release of Yu and Xu as they have been "detained solely for the peaceful exercise of their human rights including the right to freedom of expression."

=== 2024: Three-year sentence ===
On October 29, 2024, the People's Republic of China's (PRC) courts sentenced Yu and his wife Xu Yan to three years and one year and nine months in prison, respectively, for "inciting subversion of state power."

Two days after the sentencing, on October 31, U.S. Department of State Spokesperson Matthew Miller issued a statement calling for Yu and Xu's unconditional release. Miller added that during Yu and Xu's trial, authorities had barred foreign diplomats from attending, including those from the U.S.

==== Appeal ====
In January 2025, the Suzhou Intermediate People's Court rejected Yu's appeal against his sentence.

The day of the rejection of Yu's appeal, the European Union External Action's Spokesperson released a statement reiterating calls for Yu's release. It stated that "[t]he EU has consistently expressed its concern about the case of Yu Wensheng and his wife Xu Yan [...] Both were detained on 13 April 2023 while en route to a meeting at the EU Delegation in Beijing."

Amnesty International's Interim Regional Deputy Director for Research Kate Schuetze commented that the charges against Yu and his wife "reveal the authorities' inability to provide any legitimate justification for their imprisonment [...] The Chinese government has used Yu's online comments and his numerous international human rights awards as an excuse to label him a threat to national security."

==== Release ====
Yu was released on 13 April 2026 after completing his sentence.

== Awards ==
=== The Franco-German Prize for Human Rights and the Rule of Law ===
While in detention, Yu won the Franco-German Prize for Human Rights and the Rule of Law for 2018, which was granted by the French and German ambassadors to Beijing and received by Yu's wife, Xu Yan, on Yu's behalf. The award was granted by French and German ambassadors to Beijing.

=== The Martin Ennals Award ===
The Martin Ennals Award for Human Rights Defenders

On 11 February 2021, Yu won the Martin Ennals Award for his work to defend human rights in China despite many obstacles. Philippe Currat, president of the board of the Martin Ennals Foundation that administers the award, said: "On the eve of the Chinese New Year, we hope this recognition of Yu Wensheng's work will shine a light on his achievements and help him regain the freedom he has lost".

Phil Lynch, executive director of the International Service for Human Rights, said the award demonstrated that "unjustly imprisoning Yu [...] will not go ignored".

=== 2022 Grant in Memory of Anna Dahlbäck ===
On September 9, 2022, Yu was given the "2022 Grant in Memory of Anna Dahlbäck" by the Swedish Foundation of Anna Dahlbäck Memorial Fund. Yu's award by the Foundation was supported by Amnesty International, Swedish NGO Diakonia, the United Nations High Commissioner for Refugees, the Red Cross, the Swedish Bar Association, among others.
