= Journal of Human Rights Practice =

- Discipline: Law
- Language: English

Publication details
- Publisher: Oxford University Press (United Kingdom)

Standard abbreviations
- ISO 4: J. Hum. Rights Pract.

Indexing
- ISSN: 1757-9619 (print); 1757-9627 (web)

Links
- Journal homepage

The Journal of Human Rights Practice is a peer reviewed academic journal of human rights practice and activism. It is published by the Oxford University Press.
