= Amdjereme raid =

2006 cross-border attack on Chad by Sudanese militiamen

Raid on Amdjereme
- Part of Chadian-Sudanese conflict
Date	March 6, 2006
Location	Amdjereme, Chad
Result	Breaking of the Tripoli Accord and renewal of the Chadian-Sudanese conflict

Belligerents
Janjaweed	Chad military

Casualties and losses
Unknown	Unknown

The alleged raid on Amdjereme took place in Amdjereme, Chad on March 6, 2006, only two weeks after Chad and Sudan signed the Tripoli Accord in which the governments of the two nations pledged to end support for rebels operating in their respective countries. According to Chadian forces, the attack began when Janjaweed, Sudanese militiamen, aided by the Government of Sudan, crossed the border from Sudan into Chad and raided the town of Amdjereme. According to Chadian Minister of Communications Hourmadji Moussa Doumgor the Janjaweed stole "700 camels, 1,000 cows and 1,500 sheep and other goods belonging to these peaceful citizens. This new janjawid attack constitutes a flagrant violation of the Tripoli Accord and the Sudanese government should be held responsible. This latest incursion by Sudanese government militia undermines efforts backed by the African Union and Libya to seek a lasting solution to the conflict between the two countries."

In the government report, the Chadian military exchanged gunfire with the rebels and chased them back into Sudan. They recovered and returned the livestock to the citizens of Amdjereme.

The Government of Chad has accused Sudan of supporting United Front for Democratic Change rebels in the past, such as the Battle of Borota and the first and Second Battle of Adré. Chadian President Idriss Déby is especially concerned over recent high-level defections from the Chadian military to Sudan. The attack was the second in the region in three days.

== See also ==
- Chad-Sudan conflict
  - Second Battle of Adré
  - Battle of Borota
- United Front for Democratic Change
- Mohammed Nour Abdelkerim
