= Borota (disambiguation) =

Borota is a village in Bács-Kiskun county, in the Southern Great Plain region of Hungary.

Borota may also refer to:

Places

- Borota, Chad, a city in Chad
  - Borota raid, 2006 attack in Borota

People

- Petar Borota (1952 – 2010), Serbian footballer

== See also ==
- Borot (disambiguation)
- Borut (disambiguation)
