= List of massacres in Chad =

The following is a list of massacres that have occurred in Chad (numbers may be approximate):

Name	Date	Perpretrator	Location	Deaths including perpetrators	Notes
Bébalem massacre	16 April 1952	Senegalese Tirailleurs on the orders of the French colonial authorities	Bébalem	24 (according to Bernard Lanne) 70 (according to canton chief) 375 (according to survivors)	
2005 Chad attacks	September 2005	Janjaweed	Modoyna near Chad-Sudan border	36-75	Part of Chadian Civil War (2005–2010)
Borota raid	6 January 2006	Janjaweed	Borota, Ouaddai Region	9	Part of Chadian Civil War (2005–2010)
2015 N'Djamena bombings	15 and 27 June, 11 July 2015	Boko Haram	N'Djamena	59	Part of Boko Haram Insurgency.
Baga Sola bombings	10 October 2015	Boko Haram	Baga Sola	36+	Part of Boko Haram Insurgency.
December 2015 Chad suicide bombings	5 December 2015	Boko Haram	Lake Chad	19	Part of Boko Haram Insurgency.
March 2020 Chad and Nigeria massacres	23 March 2020	Boko Haram	Bohama military camp	98 (soldiers)	Part of Boko Haram Insurgency.
