= United Front for Democratic Change =

Chadian rebel alliance

- Front uni pour le changement
- Founders: Hassan Salleh al-Gadam; Mahamat Nour Abdelkerim; Yaya Dillo Djérou; Abdelwahit About; Babikir Ismail; Abakar Tollimi; Almado Awad Mardo; Yaya Batit Ali al-Mahmoudi
- Leader: Mahamat Nour Abdelkerim
- First Vice President: Hassan Salleh al-Gadam
- Second Vice President: Abakar Tollimi
- Secretary General: Abdelwahit About
- Founded: 26–28 December 2005
- Groups: CNT; RDL; SCUD; FIDEL (until May 2007); FNTR; Group of 8 December; CNR; FRRRT:
- Ideology: Anti-Déby
- Size: 5000–7000 (April 2006)
- Part of: UFDD (from 2006)

The United Front for Democratic Change (Arabic: الجبهة المتحدة للتغيير الديمقراطي; French: Front uni pour le changement; FUC) was a Chadian rebel alliance, made up of eight individual rebel groups, all with the goals of overthrowing the government of Chadian president Idriss Déby. It is now part of the Union of Forces for Democracy and Development. UFDC was founded between 26 and 28 December 2005 in Modeina in eastern Chad. FUC's "president" is Mahamat Nour Abdelkerim, the former leader of the Rally for Democracy and Liberty rebel group, "first vice president" Hassan Salleh Algadam, "second vice president" Abakar Tollimi, and "secretary-general" Abdelwahit About. On 18 December the RDL and another allied rebel group, Platform for Change, Unity and Democracy, attacked the city of Adré. The attack was repulsed by the Chadian military, and the Chadian government accused the Sudanese government of supporting the rebels, which Sudanese President Omar al-Bashir denies. Chad declared a "state of belligerance" with Sudan on 23 December 2005, resulting in the Chad-Sudan Conflict. The result was the Tripoli Agreement.

Abdullahi Abdel Karim, the spokesperson for the Rally for Democracy and Liberty (RDL) rebels said, "Each of our groups had their own forces, men and equipment. Now, we'll be joining them together."

On 19 January 2006, Abdelwahit About was arrested by the Sudanese government along with twenty other F.U.C. rebels, after he gave a radio interview stating that not only was he in Khartoum, but the F.U.C. had friendly ties to the Sudanese government.

On 12 April 2006, rebels from the United Front drove 1000 km from their bases near the Sudan border to the Chadian capital, N'Djamena. Their attack on the capital which occurred before dawn was repelled by the Chadian army, as reported on 13 April. (See Battle of N'Djamena.)

== Rebel groups within FUC ==
The eight (defunct) rebel groups that form the FUC:

- CNT: Hassan Salleh Al Gadam (President)
- RDL: Mahamat Nour Abdelkerim (President)
- SCUD: Yaya Dillo Djérou (Coordinator)
- FIDEL: Abdelwahit About (Secretary General)
- FNTR: Babikir Ismail (Representative)
- Group of 8 December: Abakar Tollimi (Coordinator)
- CNR: Almado Awad Mardo (Chargé of defense)
- FRRRT: Yaya Batit Ali Al-Mahmoudi (President)

== 2006 peace accord ==
On 24 December 2006, Chad's President Idriss Deby Itno and rebel leader Mahamat Nour Abdelkerim signed a peace accord ending hostilities between the Chadian government and the United Front for Democratic Change. A substantial portion of the forces commanded by Abdelkerim were scheduled to be integrated into the Chadian national army over the subsequent three months, but the remaining rebel factions continued to fight on against the government. Abdelkerim was brought into the government as Minister of Defense in March 2007.

Serious fighting between elements of FUC and the government forces took place on 18 October 2007 at Goz-Beïda. The fighting was said to have been precipitated by the unwillingness of the FUC elements to disarm and integrate into the army, as provided for in the peace agreement. Abdelkerim urged these FUC elements to accept integration into the army.

== Child soldiers ==
According to reports in May 2007, the rebel group had more than 1,000 child soldiers within its ranks. There are ongoing negotiations with the government of Chad for their demobilization.

== See also ==
- Second Battle of Adré
