= Borota raid =

Battle in Chad

Coordinates: 13.0000°N 21.8500°E

Raid on Borota
- Part of the prelongue of the Chad-Sudan War
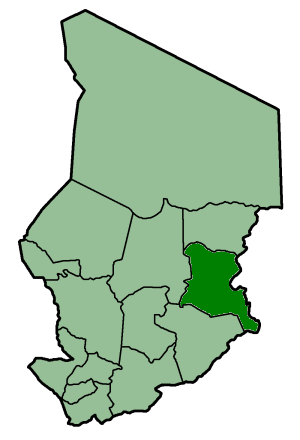
- Chad-Ouaddai
Date	January 6, 2006
Location	Borota, Chad
Result	Janjaweed victory

Belligerents
Janjaweed	Chad loyalists

Casualties and losses
- 9 civilians killed (Chadian claim)

The raid on Borota took place in Borota, Chad, near the eastern city of Adre, on January 6, 2006. According to Chadian sources, the attack began when Janjaweed, Sudanese militiamen, crossed the border from Sudan into Chad and attacked the cities of Borota, Ade, and Moudaina. Nine civilians were killed and three were seriously injured, according to the report.

The Chadian government stated, "The Sudanese militias attacked the settlements of Borota, Ade, Moudaina... yesterday killing nine and injuring three among the civilian population... The Chadian government once again warns the Sudanese government against any hasty action because aggression by Sudanese militias will not go unpunished for much longer."

The attack has been confirmed by Human Rights Watch researchers present in the area of Borota, who have documented several attacks by Janjaweed militants since mid-December. Forty villages in the Borota area have been attacked and abandoned by civilians. In several attacks between December 16 and January 20, sixteen villagers were killed and six were wounded, with the last attack being directly witnessed by the Human Rights Watch researchers in the village.

== See also ==
- Chad-Sudan conflict
- Battle of Adre
- United Front for Democratic Change
- Mohammed Nour Abdelkerim
