= Military ranks of Chad =

The Military ranks of Chad are the military insignia used by the Chad National Army. Chad is a landlocked country, and does therefore not possess a navy. Being a former colony of France, Chad shares a rank structure similar to that of France.

In 2020, the National Assembly established and awarded the rank of Marshal to Idriss Déby. On 9 December 2024, the National Transitional Council elevated Mahamat Déby to the rank of Marshal.

== Commissioned officer ranks ==
The rank insignia of commissioned officers.

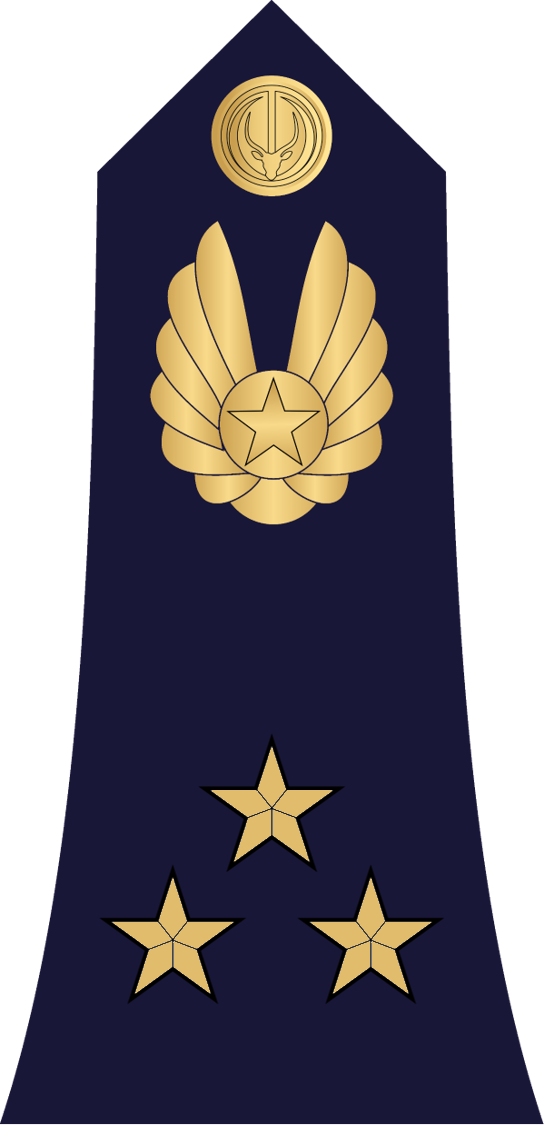
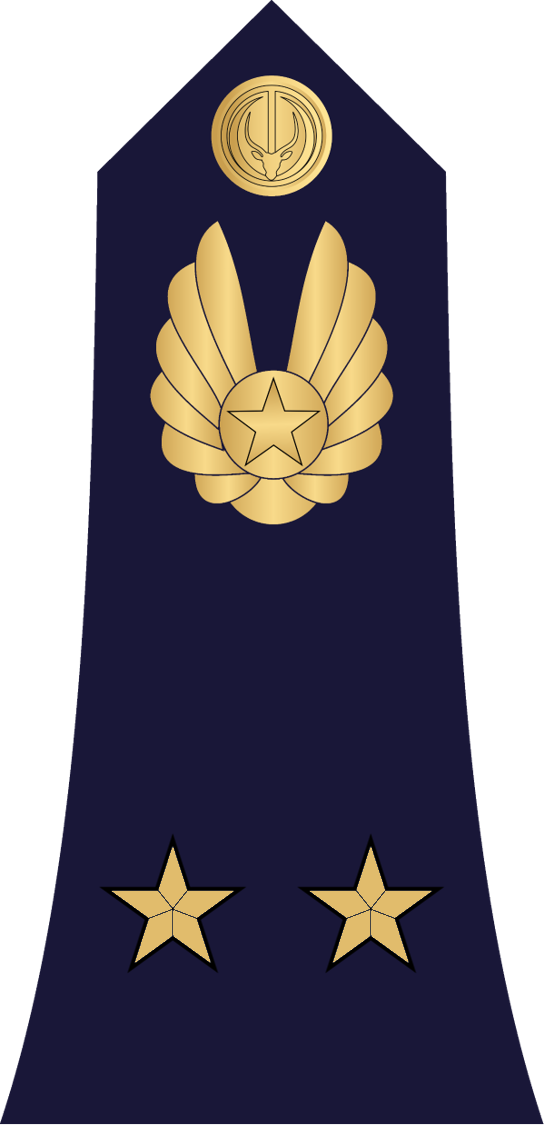
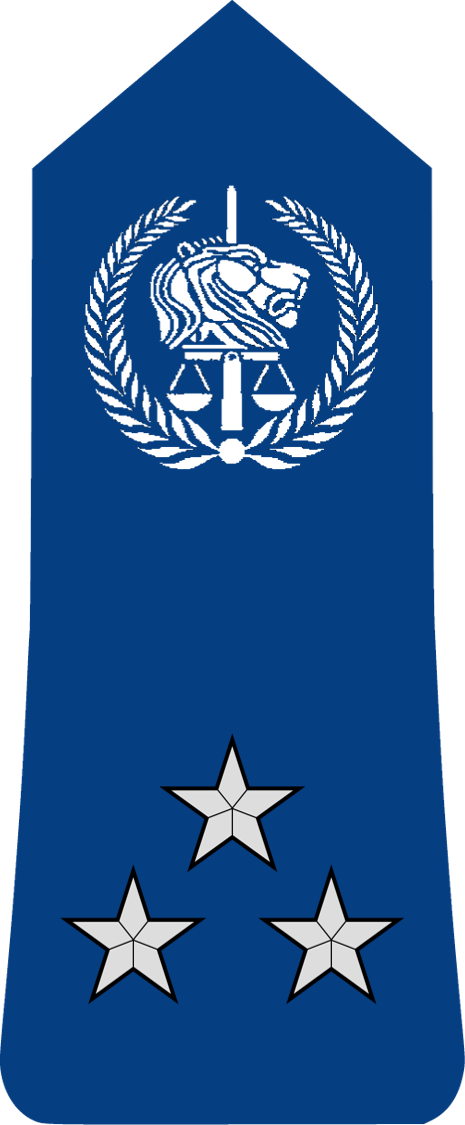
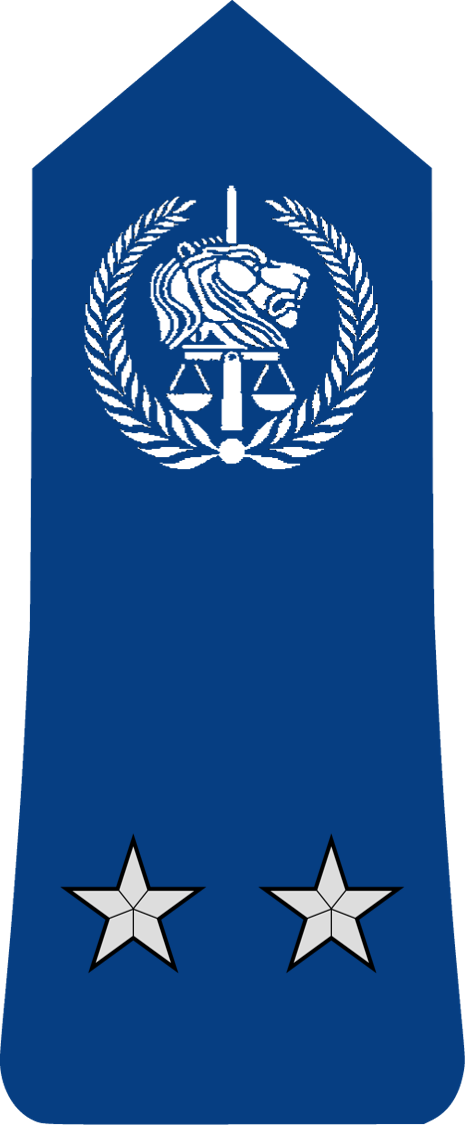
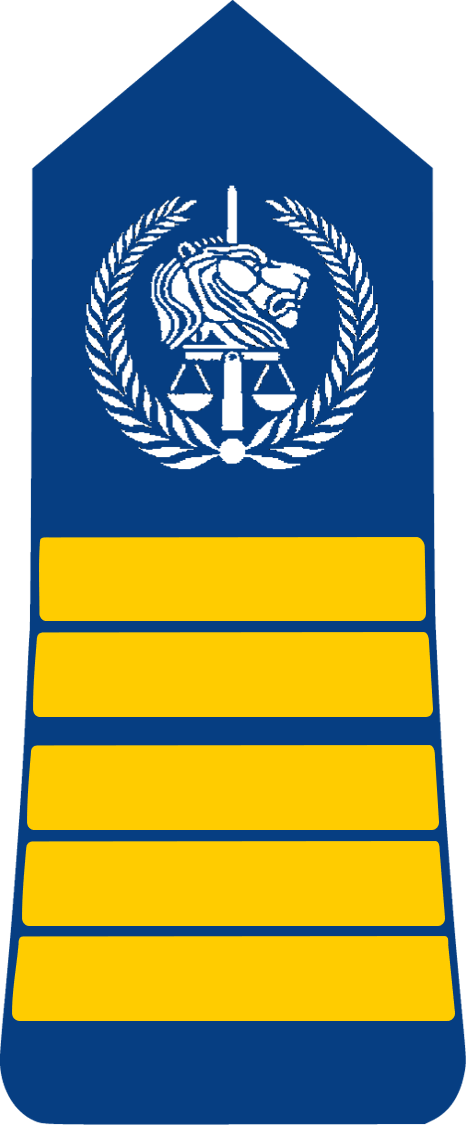
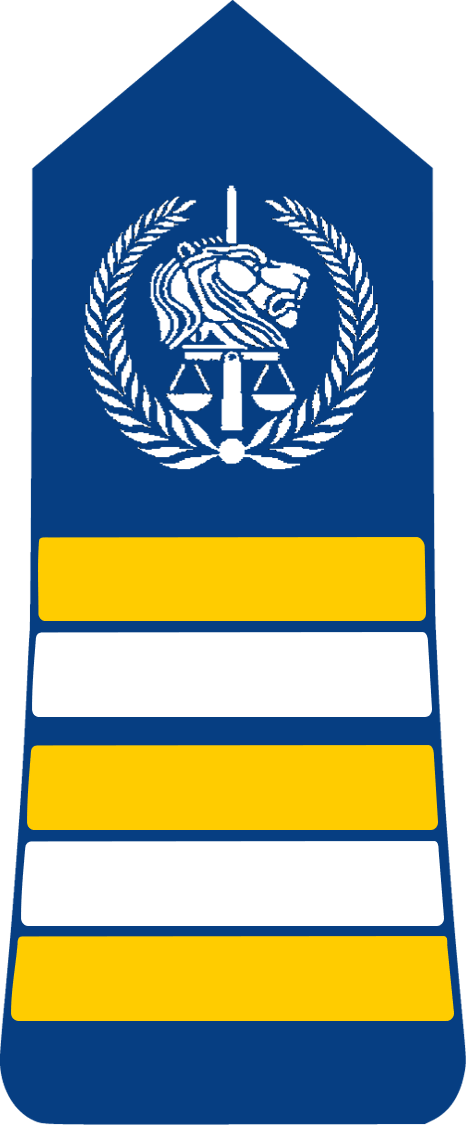
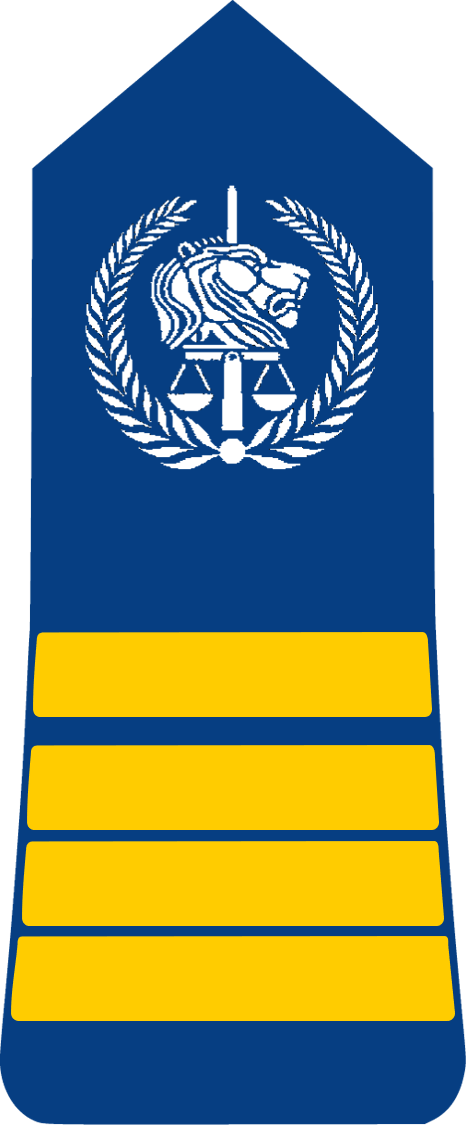
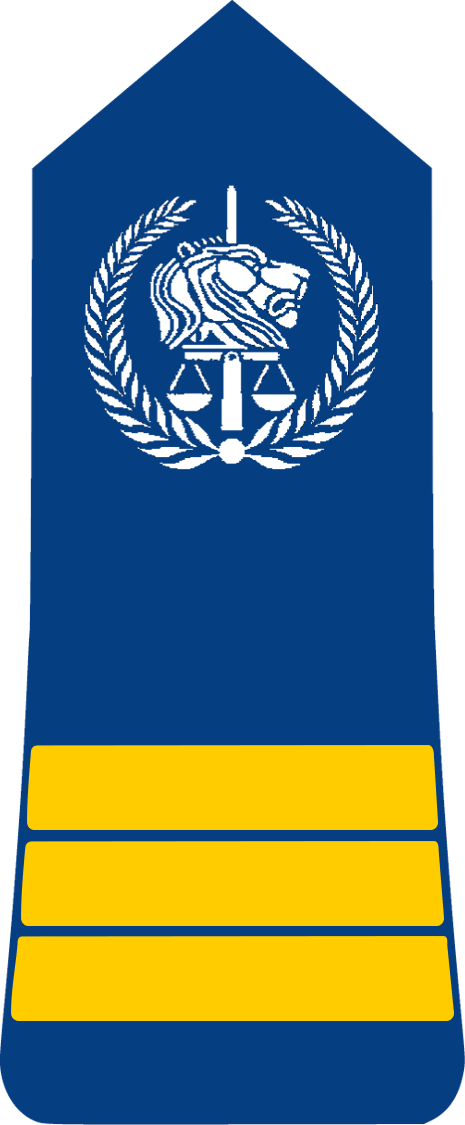
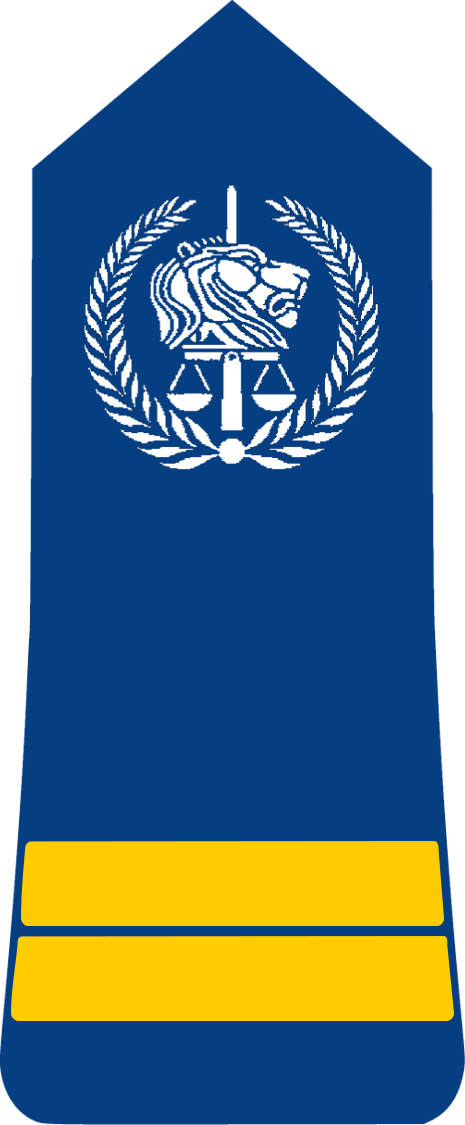
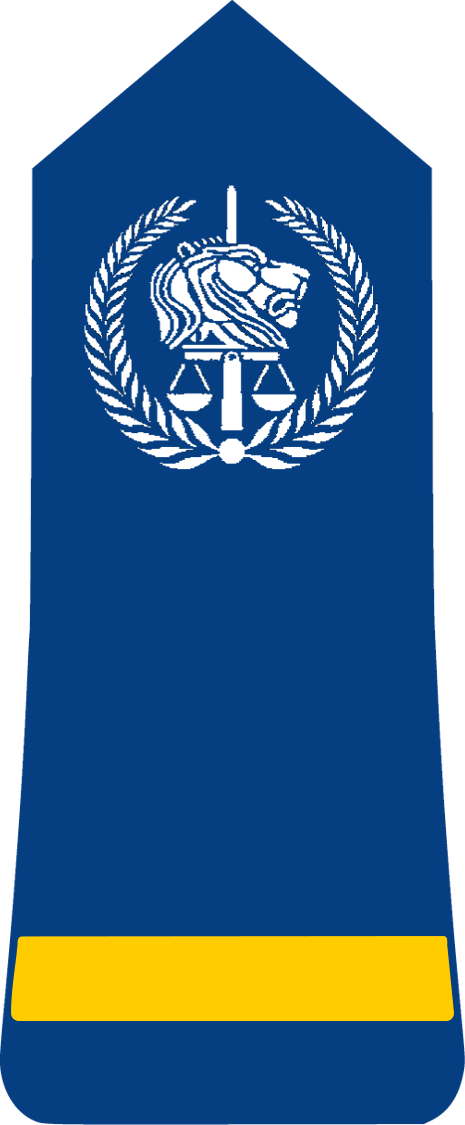
Rank group	General / flag officers					Senior officers			Junior officers
Chadian Ground Forces
Chadian Ground Forces	Maréchal	Général d'armée	Général de corps	Général de division	Général de brigade	Colonel	Lieutenant-Colonel	Commandant	Capitaine	Lieutenant	Sous-Lieutenant
Chadian Air Force
Chadian Air Force				Général de division aérienne	Général de brigade aérienne	Colonel	Lieutenant-Colonel	Commandant	Capitaine	Lieutenant	Sous-Lieutenant
Chadian National Gendarmerie
Chadian National Gendarmerie				Général de division	Général de brigade	Colonel	Lieutenant-Colonel	Commandant	Capitaine	Lieutenant	Sous-Lieutenant
Rank group	General / flag officers					Senior officers			Junior officers

== Other ranks ==
The rank insignia of non-commissioned officers and enlisted personnel.

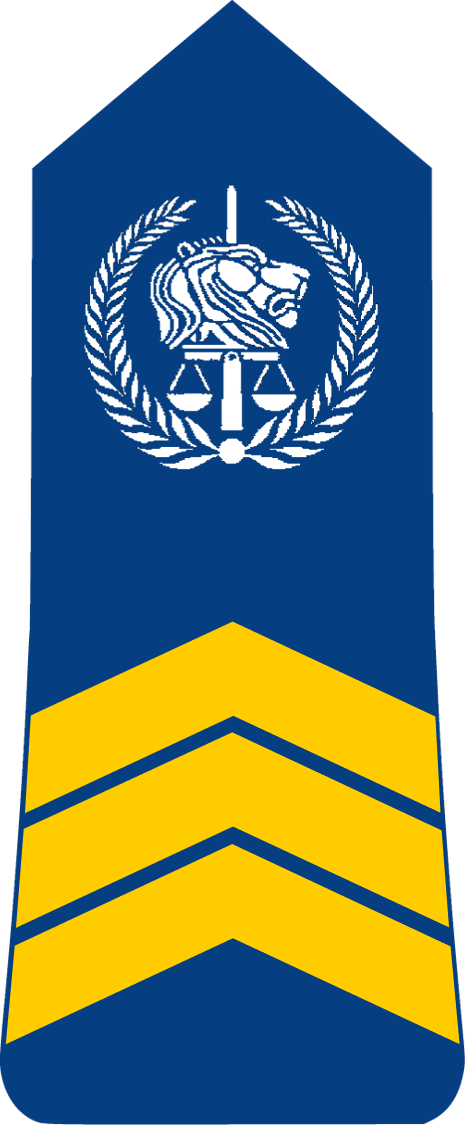
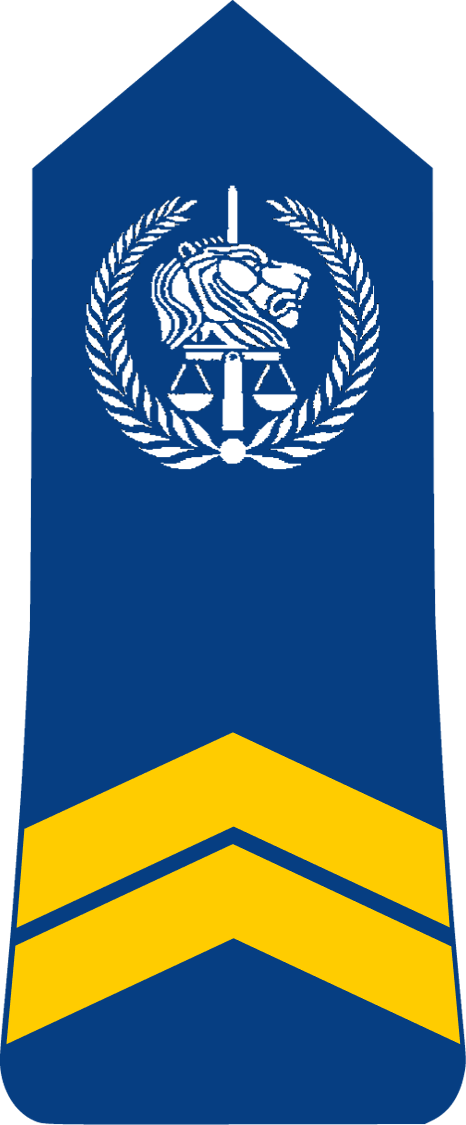
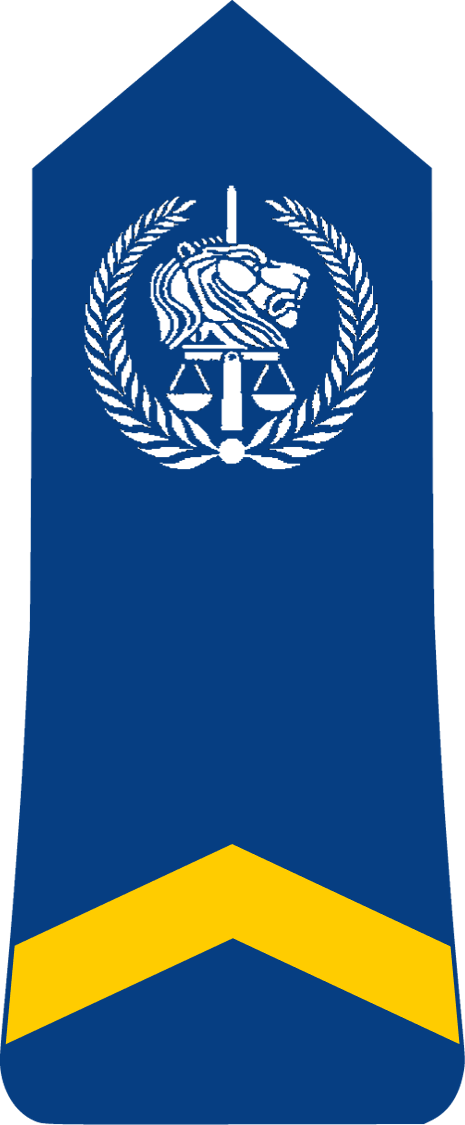
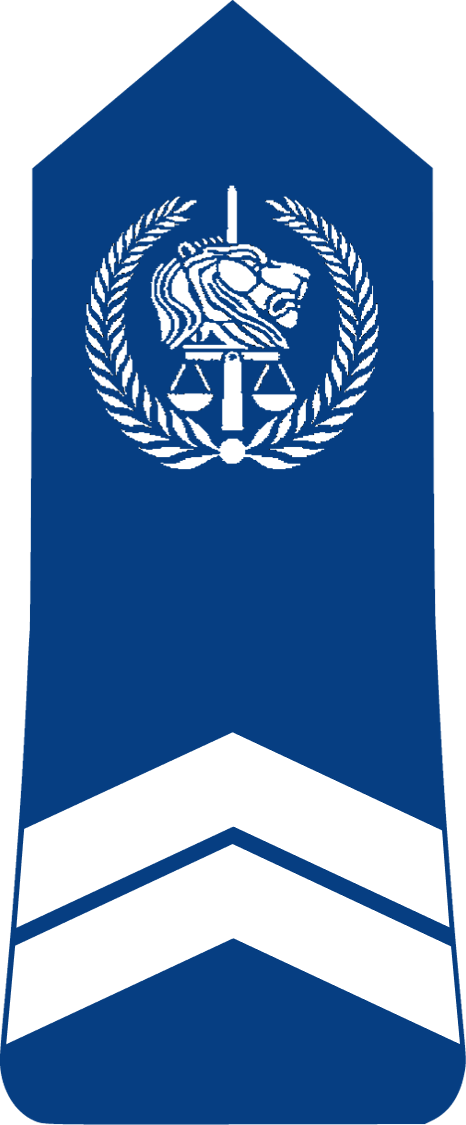
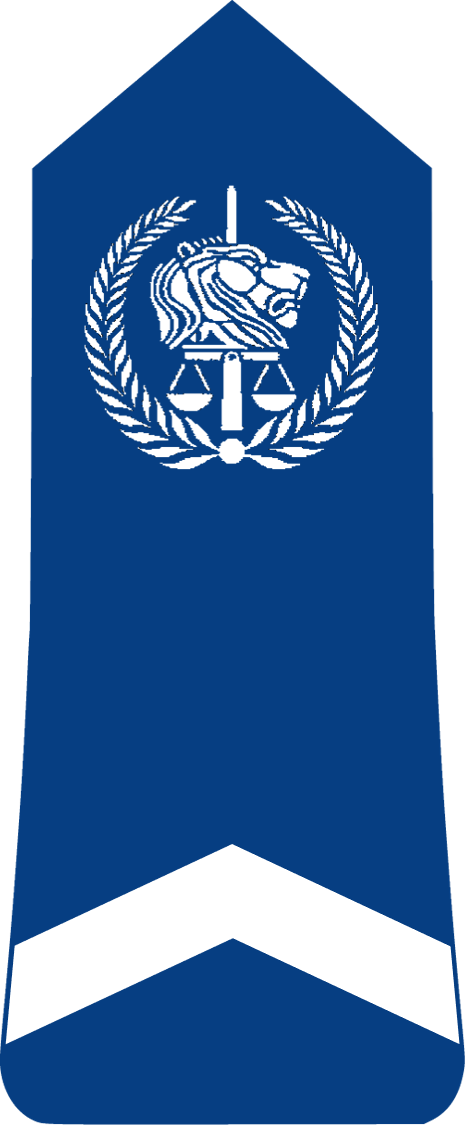
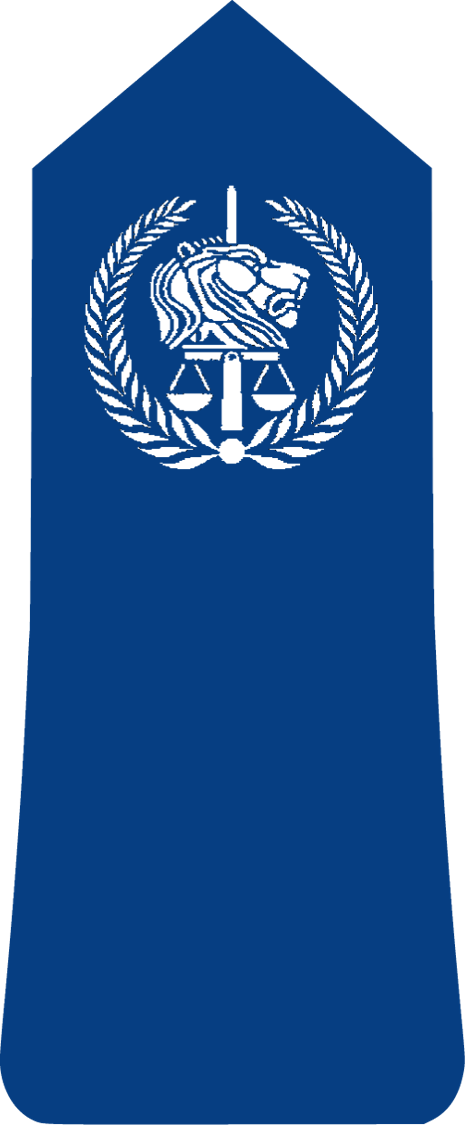
Rank group	Senior NCOs			Junior NCOs	Enlisted
Chadian Ground Forces						No insignia
Chadian Ground Forces	Sergent major	Sergent-chef	Sergent	Caporal	Soldat première	Soldat
Chadian Air Force						No insignia
Chadian Air Force	Sergent major	Sergent-chef	Sergent	Caporal	Soldat première	Soldat
Chadian National Gendarmerie
Chadian National Gendarmerie	Sergent major	Sergent-chef	Sergent	Caporal	Soldat première	Soldat
Rank group	Senior NCOs			Junior NCOs	Enlisted
