= McDoom =

McDoom is a surname. Notable people with the surname include:

- Omar Shahabudin McDoom, British political scientist, brother of Opheera
- Opheera McDoom (born 1977), British journalist, sister of Omar
