= Mohammed Nour Abdelkerim =

Chadian rebel leader (born 1960)

Minister of Defense
- In office 4 March 2007 – 1 December 2007
- President: Idriss Déby
- Prime Minister: Delwa Kassiré Koumakoye

Personal details
- Born: 1960 (age 65–66)

Military service
- Allegiance: Rally for Democracy and Liberty (2005–2006); Chad (from 2006)

Mohammed Nour Abdelkerim (born 1960) is a former Chadian rebel leader. After signing a peace agreement with the government, he served as Minister of Defense for nine months in 2007.

Born in eastern Chad, of Tama ethnicity, Nour is a nephew of Mahamat Garfa and cousin of Mahamat Abbo Sileck.

He founded and led the rebel group Rally for Democracy and Liberty until it became a subsidiary to the United Front for Democratic Change rebel alliance, led by Nour and formed between 26 and 28 December 2005. Nour masterminded the Battle of Adré on December 18, 2005, that ended with the deaths of either 100 or 300 rebels. After the attack, List of heads of state of Chad Idriss Déby declared a state of war with Sudan. The first battle of the Chadian Civil War (2005–2010) took place on December 26 when Chadian National Army crossed the border with Sudan while pursuing the RDL.

== Interview with Opheera McDoom ==
Mohammed Nour was interviewed by Opheera McDoom, the first time he was interviewed by a western journalist, on 13 February 2006. He told McDoom that Chadian army deserters join UFDC ranks every day, and that the troops bring their weapons and supplies with them. Colonel Ahmed Youssef Bishara's defection alone brings 1,800 new troops. "There's not been anything as big as this in all my experience. Here we have many heavy weapons and many troops -- much more than Déby had. Déby has taken the money from the Chadian people -- now we want freedom. We have people in the high ranks with us. When Déby is sleeping we know what he just ate for dinner."

== Peace agreement ==
Nour signed a peace agreement with Déby in Tripoli, Libya on December 24, 2006, speaking of the need for reconciliation. Other rebel groups rejected this and said they would continue to fight. On March 4, 2007, he was named Minister of Defense as part of a cabinet reshuffle in the new government of Prime Minister Delwa Kassiré Koumakoye.

The disarming and integration of FUC fighters into the army, as provided for in the peace agreement, went poorly, and clashes erupted between FUC fighters and the army. Following fighting at Goz Beïda on October 18, 2007, Nour ordered FUC fighters accept integration into the army, threatening that those who did not would face punishment for insubordination and would be considered deserters. The situation reportedly led to distrust between Déby and Nour and doubts about the loyalty of FUC fighters to the government. Amid escalating fighting in the east with another rebel group, the Union of Forces for Democracy and Development, Déby dismissed Nour from the government on December 1, 2007, without giving a reason. Nour's anti-Zaghawa sentiments were well known and so a break between Nour and Deby was only a matter of time. Nour took refuge in the Libyan embassy.

== See also ==
- Adré
