= Platform for Change, Unity and Democracy =

Chadian rebel group

Platform for Change, Unity and Democracy, abbreviated as S.C.U.D. (Socle pour le Changement, l'Unité et la Démocratie in French), is a Chadian rebel group that was formed in October 2005 by former members of the Military of Chad who deserted and united under founders and current leaders, 30-year-old Yaya Dillo Djérou and his brother. The group's main objective is to oust the government of the current Chadian president, and uncle of Djérou and his brother, Idriss Déby. SCUD has bases in eastern Chad and in the Darfur region of Sudan. On December 18, 2005, SCUD, along with members of the Rally for Democracy and Liberty (RDL) rebel group, attacked Chadian troops stationed in the city of Adré, sparking the Chadian-Sudanese conflict.

Massimo Giovanola of Cooperazione Internazionale said, "Déby is said to have got to the point of offering the rebels 400 million CFA francs (about €600,000) to put down their arms... but it’s not a question of money. Déby has acquired too much power in recent years and the Zaghawa have decided to get rid of him."
