= Chad–Sudan relations =

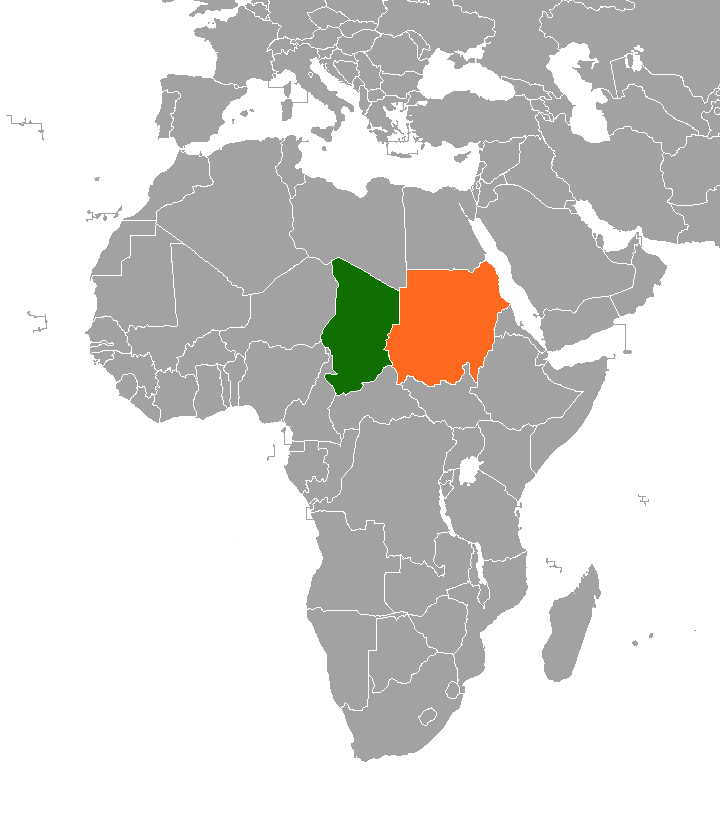

- Chad: Sudan

The populations of eastern Chad and western Sudan established social and religious ties long before either nation's independence, and these remained strong despite disputes between governments. In recent times, relations have been strained due to the conflict in Darfur and a civil war in Chad, which both governments accuse the other of supporting.

== History ==
Herdsmen have in both countries freely crossed the 950 km (590 mi) border for centuries. Muslims in eastern Chad often traveled through Sudan on the hajj, or annual pilgrimage to Mecca, and many young people from eastern Chad studied at Islamic schools in Sudan. In addition, Sudan's cotton plantations employed an estimated half a million Chadian workers in 1978.

At the same time, the basis for political enmity between these two nations was set in the early 1960s, when Chad's southern bias in government offended many Sudanese Muslims. Sudan allowed FROLINAT rebels to organize, train, and establish bases in western Sudan and to conduct raids into Chad from Sudan's Darfur Province. Refugees from both countries fled across their mutual border.

Following the coup that ousted Chadian President François Tombalbaye in 1975, relations between presidents Jaafar an Numayri and Félix Malloum (the Sudanese and Chadian heads of state, respectively) were surprisingly cordial, in part because both nations feared Libyan destabilization. Sudan sponsored talks among Chad's rebel army leaders in the late 1970s and urged Malloum to incorporate them into his government. (Numayri promoted the talents and intelligence of future Chadian president, Hissène Habré, in particular, and persuaded Malloum to appoint Habré to political office in 1978.) These ties were strained in part because of Numayri's warming relations with Libyan leader Muammar al-Gaddafi.

As violence in Chad increased between 1979 and 1982, Sudan faced its own internal rebellion, and relations deteriorated after Numayri was ousted in 1985. In 1988 Habré assailed Sudan for allowing Libyan troops to be stationed along Chad's border and for continuing to allow assaults on Chadian territory from Sudan.

At the time of the Bashir coup in June 1989, western Darfur was being used as a battleground by troops loyal to the Chadian government of Hissène Habré and rebels organized by Idriss Déby and supported by Libya. Deby was from the Zaghawa ethnic group that lived on both sides of the Chad-Sudan border, and the Zaghawa of Darfur provided him support and sanctuary. Hundreds of Zaghawa from Chad had also fled into Sudan to seek refuge from the fighting. The RCC-NS was not prepared for a confrontation with Chad, which was already providing assistance to the SPLM, and thus tended to turn a blind eye when Chadian forces crossed into Darfur in pursuit of the rebels.

In May 1990, Chadian soldiers invaded the provincial capital of Al Fashir, where they rescued wounded comrades being held at a local hospital. During the summer, Chadian forces burned eighteen Sudanese villages and abducted 100 civilians. Deby's Patriotic Movement for Salvation (Mouvement Patriotique du Salut) provided arms to Sudanese Zaghawa and Arab militias, ostensibly so that they could protect themselves from Chadian forces. The militias, however, used the weapons against their own rivals, principally the ethnic Fur, and several hundred civilians were killed in civil strife during 1990. The government was relieved when Deby finally defeated Habré in December 1990. The new government in N'Djamena signaled its willingness for good relations with Sudan by closing down the SPLM office. Early in 1991, Bashir visited Chad for official talks with Deby on bilateral ties.

Sudan's border with Chad had a certain “Wild West” quality to it in the early 2000s. Neither government had firm control over territory its their jurisdiction. Both sides of the Chad border have served as a launching pad for Chadian rebels trying to overthrow the government in N’Djamena. There was always considerable movement across this border; the ethnic groups on each side being related. As recently as 2003, there were only about 13,000 Sudanese refugees in Chad and virtually no Chadian refugees in Sudan. As a result of the crisis in Darfur, the number of Sudanese refugees in Chad jumped to more than 250,000, and large numbers of Chadians took refuge in Sudan. The two governments signed a series of agreements on political cooperation and security along their border. Chadian president Idriss Déby, a Zaghawa who came from the Sudan border area, worked hard but without success to mediate an end to the dispute between the government in Khartoum and the Darfur rebel groups.

Sudanese–Chadian relations significantly deteriorated in 2005 as both countries allowed their territory to be used for subversive activities against the other. Darfur and the situation along the border became part of a Zaghawa power struggle in Chad. Libya mediated the dispute and convinced Chad and Sudan to sign the Tripoli Declaration and Agreement of February 8, 2006. But an April 2006 attack by Chadian rebels against the Déby government in N’Djamena nearly toppled it. Déby accused Sudan of supporting the effort and broke diplomatic relations with Khartoum. By November 2006, Déby declared that Chad was in a state of war with Sudan. Following deadly clashes along the Sudan–Chad border in April 2007, Chad's foreign minister said it was time to turn the page and improve relations with Sudan. The two countries set up a joint military committee to monitor the border and in May the two presidents signed a reconciliation accord in Saudi Arabia. By the beginning of 2008, however, relations had again deteriorated, with the leader of each country accusing the other of conducting cross-border attacks. In March 2008, launching from Chad, a number of JEM troops reached Omdurman on the outskirts of Khartoum. Sudan and Chad signed a non-aggression agreement March 13, 2008, aiming to halt cross-border hostilities. On May 11, 2008, Sudan announced it was cutting diplomatic relations with Chad, claiming that it was helping rebels in Darfur to attack the Sudanese capital Khartoum. Six months later, in November 2008, relations continued. Further efforts by both Libya and Qatar to improve relations between the two produced a security agreement in late 2009 to control rebel movements from Chad into Sudan.

=== 2010 normalization ===
Sudanese-Chadian relationship improved significantly after Chadian President Idriss Déby visited Khartoum in February 2010 and agreed with Omar al-Bashir to normalize relations. The rapprochement led to a framework agreement between Khartoum and the main opposition group Justice and Equality Movement (JEM), providing for a ceasefire and for further negotiations in Doha, Qatar. The agreement also committed each country not to shelter the other's rebels and called on those groups to pursue electoral or political participation instead.

Al-Bashir then released more than half of the prisoners held since the JEM attack on Omdurman, while Chad refused permission for the leader of the JEM to land in N’Djamena. By late 2010, Sudan and Chad had normalized their relations, and Déby publicly stated his opposition to a North–South division of Sudan.

=== During the 2023-2026 Sudan conflict ===
In March 2024, at a session of the UN Security Council devoted to the conflict in Sudan, certain delegations expressed their concern about the closure of the border between Sudan and Chad, which prevented the entry of humanitarian aid into Darfur.

In November 2024, Sudan filed a complaint against Chad before the African Commission on Human and Peoples' Rights (African Union). The complaint targets the Chadian government and accuses it of intervening in Sudanese affairs by supporting the paramilitaries at war since 2023.

On 23 February 2026, Chad shut its eastern border with Sudan indefinitely, citing repeated incursions by Sudanese armed groups and growing insecurity near its territory. The decision followed heavy fighting in the border town of al-Tina between the RSF and forces aligned with the Sudanese army, and Chad said limited humanitarian exemptions could still be granted with prior approval.

== See also ==
- Raid on Amdjereme
- Chad–Sudan border
- Chadian Civil War (2005–2010)
