= Socialist Party Without Borders =

Socialist Party Without Borders Parti socialiste sans frontières
- Arabic name: الحزب الاشتراكي بلا حدود
- Abbreviation: PSF
- President: Yaya Dillo Djerou Betchi
- Founder: Dinamou Daram
- Founded: 2015
- Banned: 13 March 2024
- Women's wing: Organisation des femmes socialiste sans frontières
- Ideology: Democratic socialism; Decentralization; Anti-corruption
- Political position: Centre-left to left-wing
- Seats in the National Assembly: 0 / 155

Website
- psf-tchad.org

The Socialist Party Without Borders (French: Parti socialiste sans frontières, PSF; Arabic: الحزب الاشتراكي بلا حدود) is a political party of the opposition in Chad. It is a democratic socialist party with a decentralization and anti-corruption platform.

On 6 August 2021, Yaya Dillo Djerou Betchi was elected president of the party, replacing the founder Dinamou Daram. Under Dinamou Daram, who was jailed by the Chadian government in October 2016 for encouraging citizens not to pay taxes and fines, PSF joined the opposition coalition FONAC.

== February 2024 crackdown ==
In February 2024, the Chadian government blamed the PSF for an attack on the offices of the Chadian intelligence services, which had caused "several deaths" in N'Djamena. This attack came after the arrest of a PSF member accused of "attempted assassination against the president of the Supreme Court" and a day after the announcement that the presidential elections will be held on 6 May. After 33 years of the power being in the hands of the Déby family, the elections can offer continuation to the son of Idriss Déby.

After the news of both the shooting and arrest of Ahmed Torabi, the party member accused of the assassination attempt, emerged, Yaya Dillo Djérou claimed that the attacks were staged by the Chadian government. Djérou said that Torabi was executed by security forces after his arrest, with his body being placed outside the offices of the Chadian intelligence services. Other PSF members and Torabi's relatives went there to retrieve his body, but were ambushed by soldiers, resulting in several deaths.

In the response, military vehicles surrounded the PSF headquarters amid heave gunfire. According to internet watchdog Netblocks, connectivity was restricted. Yaya Dillo Djérou was among dozens killed on 28 February after the party's office was besieged by the Chadian Army amid unrest over the elections. The attacks were condemned by the African Union, and French Minister for Europe and Foreign Affairs Jean-Yves Le Drian called on an impartial investigation into the incident. On 13 March 2024, the party was dissolved by the Chadian government.
