= Amdjereme =

Amdjereme أم جيريم
- Village
- Location in Chad
- Coordinates: 13°27′N 22°12′E
- Country: Chad
- Region: Ouaddaï
- Time zone: UTC+1 (+1)

Amdjereme (Arabic: أم جيريم) is a village in Chad.

== Raid ==
Amdjereme was the sight of the alleged Amdjereme raid, on March 6, 2006, only two weeks after Chad and Sudan signed the Tripoli Accord in which the governments of the two nations pledged to end support for rebels operating in their respective countries. According to Chadian forces, the attack began when Janjaweed, Sudanese militiamen, aided by the Government of Sudan, crossed the border from Sudan into Chad and raided the town of Amdjereme. According to Chadian Minister of Communications Hourmadji Moussa Doumgor the Janjaweed stole "700 camels, 1,000 cows and 1,500 sheep and other goods belonging to these peaceful citizens. This new Janjaweed attack constitutes a flagrant violation of the Tripoli Accord and the Sudanese government should be held responsible. This latest incursion by Sudanese government militia undermines efforts backed by the African Union and Libya to seek a lasting solution to the conflict between the two countries."
