= Tripoli Agreement =

2006 agreement ending the Chadian-Sudanese conflict

The Tripoli Agreement (also known as the Libya Accord or the Tripoli Declaration) was signed on February 8, 2006, by Chadian President Idriss Déby, Sudanese President Omar Hassan al-Bashir, and Libyan leader Muammar Gaddafi, effectively ending the Chadian–Sudanese conflict that had devastated border towns in eastern Chad and the Darfur region of western Sudan since December 2005.

== Earlier meeting ==
The agreement was reached after a mini-summit in Tripoli, Libya, hosted by Gaddafi. Prior to the meeting, Chadian Foreign Minister Ahmad Allam-Mi, Sudanese Foreign Minister Lam Akol, and Libyan Foreign Minister Abdel Rahman Shalgham attended a two-day preparatory meeting aimed at reducing the scope of the disagreement before the heads of state met to iron out the details.

== Attendance ==
Current Chairperson of the African Union and President of Congo Denis Sassou-Nguesso, Nigerian President Olusegun Obasanjo, Central African Republic President François Bozizé, African Union Chairperson of the Commission Alpha Oumar Konaré, and Burkinabé President Blaise Compaoré, the current chair of the Community of the Sahelo-Saharan States, also attended the summit.

Sudanese Minister of Information and Communication al-Zahawi Ibrahim Malik called the summit "a generous initiative from Libyan leader Muammar Gaddafi on patching up the rift and containing a security dispute between Sudan and Chad."

== Resuming relations and ending support for rebels ==
The two heads of state agreed to resuming relations and reopening consulates. The agreement calls for a ban on the use of territory of either country for hostile action and the acceptance of rebels from each other. Libya intends on overseeing the agreement to end hostile press campaigns and support of militant groups. However, Muammar Gaddafi has called on the leaders of each nation to continue talks on solving the root cause of tensions.

"What's going on in Darfur is the cause of the tension in relations between Sudan and Chad... It is shameful that Africa resorts to weapons whenever there is a dispute. Unfortunately, we turn all our differences into wars, which gives an opportunity for foreign interference," Gaddafi said. Gaddafi backs the Agreement to keep make sure the conflict stays "solely African." The United Nations Security Council has contingency plans for international peacekeepers to replace African Union soldiers in Darfur. Gaddafi further stated that the nations involved in the dispute "have no need of UN peacekeepers - we have our own African forces - and we certainly have no need of the forces of our friend Prime Minister Tony Blair. We can settle our problems ourselves."

"The Tripoli peace agreement will enable the two countries to restore their good relations after they were about to go into the wrong path," Déby said.

"We will commit ourselves to the agreement because we are seriously endeavoring to exert sincere efforts which will be practically reflected in improving good neighborly relations," al-Bashir said.

== Creation of new agencies ==
In addition, the Tripoli Agreement creates a "ministerial committee," chaired by Libya, to find a long term solution to the conflict, a commission to acquire information about the situation, and a peace force to prevent cross-border attacks by rebel groups like the UFDC and the Alliance of Revolutionary Forces of West Sudan. On February 12 Human Rights Watch expressed disapproval of the treaty's proposed multinational, instead of international peace force.

The African ministerial committee, made up of the foreign ministers of Chad, Sudan, Libya, Central African Republic, Congo Brazzaville, and Burkina Faso and the chairman of the executive council of the Community of the Sahel-Saharan States (CEN-SAD), met in Tripoli on March 6 and Libyan Foreign Minister Abdel Rahman Shalgham described the results. African Union (AU) Commissioner for peace and security Said Djinnit delivered his report on the conflict and the committee agreed to set up surveillance groups on the Chadian-Sudanese border. The other groups proposed in the Tripoli Agreement are expected to be implemented after the committee’s next meeting, sometime before the end of March. The committee identified 10 positions along the border for surveillance, five on each side of the border, and the states expected to form the control groups and the mechanisms for their operation.

Chalgam said the meeting was "constructive, sincere and detailed," and said the results were "practical."

== Reaction ==
=== Arab League ===
Arab League Secretary General Amr Moussa said, "I have the honour to warmly congratulate [Gaddafi] for the historic achievement at the mini-African summit held under your auspices that culminated into the settlement of the recent problems that occurred between the two brotherly countries of Sudan and Chad as well the signing of a peace agreement to end the crisis that could be harmful not only to the two states, but the entire Africa and the African-Arab world. History and Arab and African peoples will cherish your efforts that contributed to the creation of a mechanism to transcend the differences between these two countries and will remember you as the Arab and African leader who has initiated Africa's unity through the creation of the [African Union] and the continuation of actions for the unification of the Arab and African worlds."

=== Libya ===
Although it was not specified in the Tripoli Agreement, Gaddafi now wanted a temporary closure of the loosely enforced border between Sudan and Chad. Gaddafi said that "these measures are stated in the African Union deeds which are included in the AU constitutive act and the non aggression and joint defense act African security and Peace council protocol and the African joint defense policy plan."

Prior to the summit Libyan Foreign Minister Abdel Rahman Shalgham emphasized the "need for all sides to contain the tensions between Chad and Sudan." After the summit Junior Libyan Foreign Minister Abdel Salam Triki expressed his belief that the summit between the leaders "was positive. We heard the points of view of both Sudanese and Chadian sides. They showed a willingness to find a mechanism to end the conflict. We feel confident about finding one."

=== Mali ===
President of Mali Amadou Toumani Touré congratulated Libya's success with the Tripoli Agreement on February 15.

=== Niger ===
President of Niger Mamadou Tandja said Gaddafi has "once again proved [his] willingness to unite the African continent and reconcile its sons. I give my sincere congratulations for the success obtained by this summit. I reiterate my backing to whatever you do to unify the African continent and to consolidate the permanent march towards well-being and progress."

=== Rebels ===
Mohammed Nour, the leader of the United Front for Democratic Change, the Chadian rebel alliance operating from bases in Darfur to attack cities in eastern Chad, was not invited to the summit, despite playing a crucial role in the tension between Chad and Sudan.

UFDC rebels regard the treaty as "a piece of paper with signatures on it. It means nothing."

Nour's original demands, for Déby to relinquish power, a two-year interim period, and fair and free national elections, have been modified. Nour now wants a national forum, before the end of June, for opposition parties and organizations to discuss how the country should move forward politically.

Nour said, "A delegation will arrive tomorrow in Libya to present our demands to [Libyan leader] Gaddafi. We will have a transitional period, the length of which the forum will decide, and then we will have free and transparent democratic elections. I guess after a week or more we will know what Déby's reaction to this proposal is. If he refuses, then we will attack using force to remove him... No one wants a war, but if that's the only way, we will go to Chad."

Another rebel group joined the UFDC on February 13, and Nour says the UFDC is "eight times stronger" than it was when it attacked the city of Adré on December 18.

Colonel Bishara Moussa Farid acted as a peacekeeper in Rwanda and the Democratic Republic of Congo, later helping both Déby and his predecessor Hissene Habre seize control of the Government of Chad. He recently defected, and said the UFDC is "much better off than the previous resistances. We didn't have equipment and heavy weapons as we do now."

=== African Union ===
Congolese Foreign Minister and current chairman of the African Union executive council Rodolphe Adada said on behalf of the African Union, "We hope to move forward. We think we could again lay the foundations for a lasting peace. The two countries have for a long time remained in an atmosphere of absolute confidence and there is no reason that we can't rekindle that confidence."

=== European Union ===
On February 14, 2006, the European Union expressed its approval of the treaty. Austria, which is the current president of the EU, released a press statement on February 13 on behalf of the EU, stating:

"After the tensions following the attack on the town of Adré by Chadian rebels [the Rally for Democracy and Liberty and Platform for Change, Unity and Democracy rebel groups] on 18 December 2005, the European Union sees this agreement as an important step towards the restoration of a climate of confidence and cooperation between the two countries. The European Union appeals to both parties to honor this agreement, in particular their commitment to refrain from hosting rebel forces of the other party on their respective territory."

== Severance of diplomatic relations ==
Following the Battle of N'Djamena in April 2006, Chad severed relations with Sudan.

== See also ==
- Kano Accord
