= Borat (disambiguation) =

Borat is a 2006 mockumentary comedy film directed by Larry Charles.

Borat may also refer to:

- Borat (caste), a Chuhra tribe in Pakistan and India
- Borat Sagdiyev, a fictional character starring in the film Borat and other media
- Borat Subsequent Moviefilm, a 2020 sequel to the original film
- Borat's Television Programme, a 2-episode spin-off television program aired on British television station Channel 4

== See also ==
- Borate
- Borut (disambiguation)
- Borot (disambiguation)
- Boral
