= 2005 Chad attacks =

Armed conflict in Chad

Armed groups attacked villagers in Chad in September 2005. Several dozen were killed, with estimates ranging from 36 to 75. Chad blamed Janjaweed forces in what was allegedly a cross border operation. This and subsequent operations then led to a deterioration in relations between Chad and Sudan.

== See also ==
- Chadian Civil War (2005–2010)
- Chad–Sudan relations
