= Chad National Concord =

Rebel group in Chad (2005–2007)

- Other name: Chad National Convention
- Founder: Hassan Saleh Al-Gaddam
- Leader: Hassan Saleh Al-Gaddam
- Founded: 2004
- Dates active: December 2005 - July 2006 (As part of FUC); July 2006 - October 2007 (Independently)
- Active regions: Sila Region, Chad
- Status: Rallied to the Government of Chad
- Size: ~ 2000
- Wars: Chadian Civil War (2005–2010)

Chad National Concord/Convention (French: Concorde nationale du Tchad or CNT) was a Chadian rebel group active during the Third Chadian Civil War. It was founded in 2004 by Hassan Saleh Al-Gaddam ‘Al-Jineidi’. Al-Gaddam was a vice-president of FUC, but in July 2006 he broke away from FUC and lead CNT into a separate rebellion against Chadian government. The CNT captured the areas of Daguessa and Tissi and managed to hold control of them for few months in 2006 and 2007. The CNT had close ties with Janjaweed. Leader of CNT, Al-Gaddam participated in Sirte talks and agreed to a ceasefire with Chadian government in October 2007. CNT rallied to Chadian government shortly after failure of Sirte agreement in December 2007. When the group rallied to the government it had 2000 members.
