= Omar Shahabudin McDoom =

British political scientist (born c. 1972)

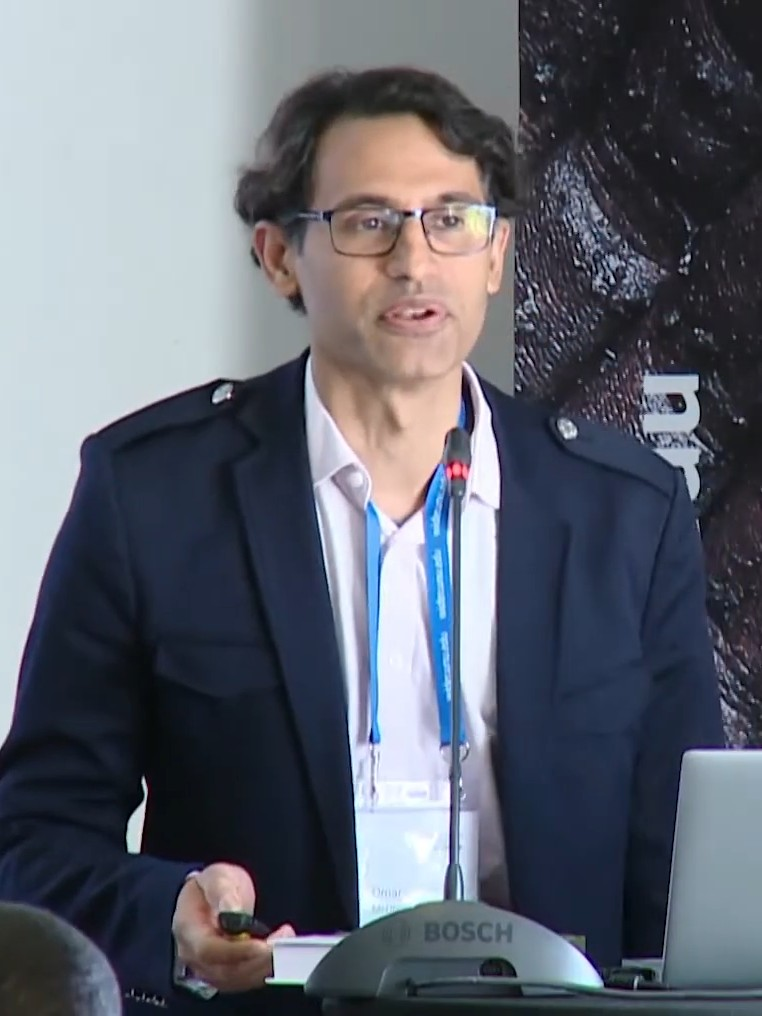
McDoom in 2022

Omar Shahabudin McDoom (born 1972 or 1973) is a British political scientist who works at the London School of Economics.

== Biography ==
Omar Shahabudin McDoom was born in London on 1972 or 1973, the son of Leila R. McDoom (a legal secretary) and Shahabudin Mohamed McDoom (a prosecutor). Omar's parents were immigrants from Georgetown, Guyana. His sister is Opheera McDoom, a journalist for Reuters based in Sudan. Omar received degrees in law from King's College London and Paris 1 Panthéon-Sorbonne University, a master's degree in international affairs from George Washington University, and a PhD in development studies from the London School of Economics. He completed his post-doctoral fellowship in the department of politics at the University of Oxford in 2009.

== Works ==
- McDoom, Omar Shahabudin (2012). "The Psychology of Threat in Intergroup Conflict: Emotions, Rationality, and Opportunity in the Rwandan Genocide". International Security. 37 (2): 119–155. doi:10.1162/ISEC_a_00100.
- McDoom, Omar Shahabudin (2021). The Path to Genocide in Rwanda: Security, Opportunity, and Authority in an Ethnocratic State. Cambridge University Press. ISBN 978-1-108-87032-0.
