= Chad–Sudan border =

International border

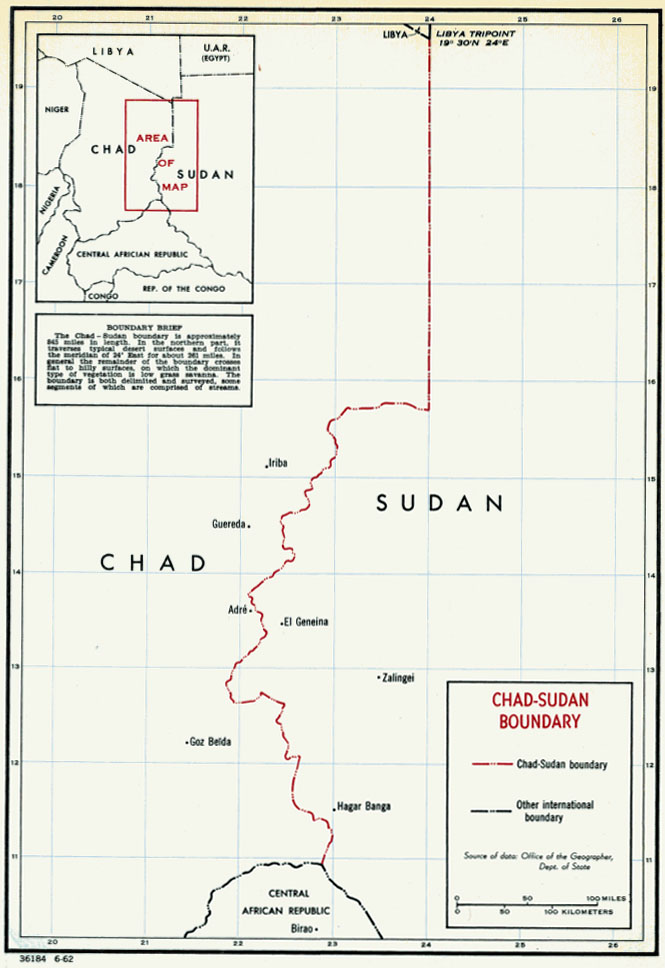
Map of the Chad-Sudan boundary

The Chad–Sudan border is 1,403 km (872 mi) in length and runs from the tripoint with Libya in the north to the tripoint with the Central African Republic in the south.

== Description ==
The border begins in the north at the tripoint with Libya on the 24th meridian east, and follows this meridian for 423 km (263 m) before reaching the Wadi Hawar. The border then forms a very irregular line down to the tripoint with the Central African Republic, delimited by numerous small streams, hills and other features. The northern area of the border lies within the Sahara Desert, the middle stretches within the Sahel, and the areas further south consist of grasslands and savannah.

== History ==
The border first emerged during the Scramble for Africa, a period of intense competition between European powers in the later 19th century for territory and influence in Africa. The process culminated in the Berlin Conference of 1884, in which the European nations concerned agreed upon their respective territorial claims and the rules of engagements going forward. As a result of this France gained control of the upper valley of the Niger River (roughly equivalent to the areas of modern Mali and Niger), and also the lands explored by Pierre Savorgnan de Brazza for France in Central Africa (roughly equivalent to modern Gabon and Congo-Brazzaville). From these bases the French explored further into the interior, eventually linking the two areas following expeditions in April 1900 which met at Kousséri in the far north of modern Cameroon. These newly conquered regions were initially ruled as military territories, with the two areas later organised into the federal colonies of French West Africa (Afrique occidentale française, abbreviated AOF) and French Equatorial Africa (Afrique équatoriale française, AEF). Meanwhile, the British had conquered Sudan in the 1890s and administered it a condominium with Egypt (Anglo-Egyptian Sudan).

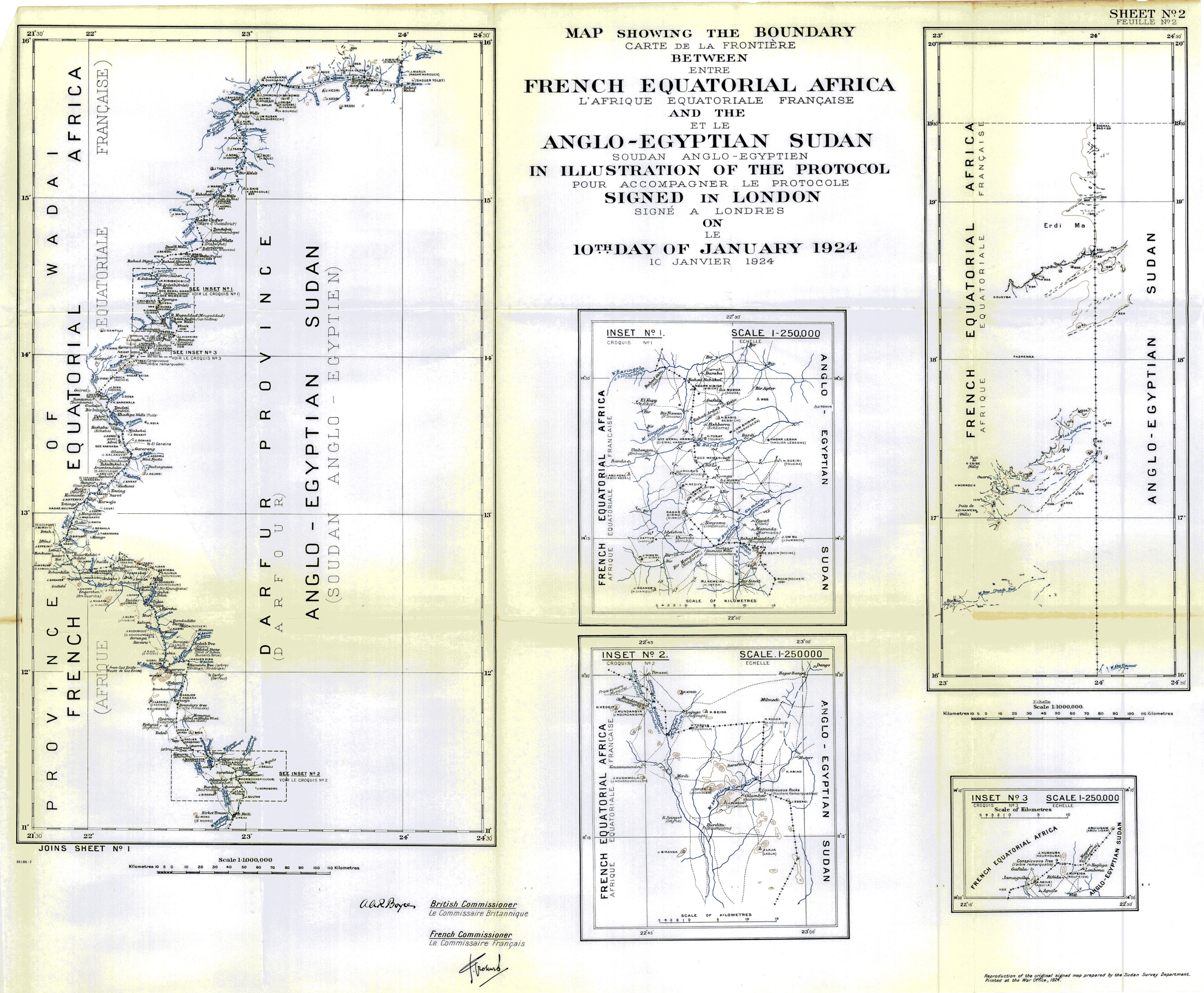
Map of the border produced in 1924 following the full boundary demarcation by Britain and France

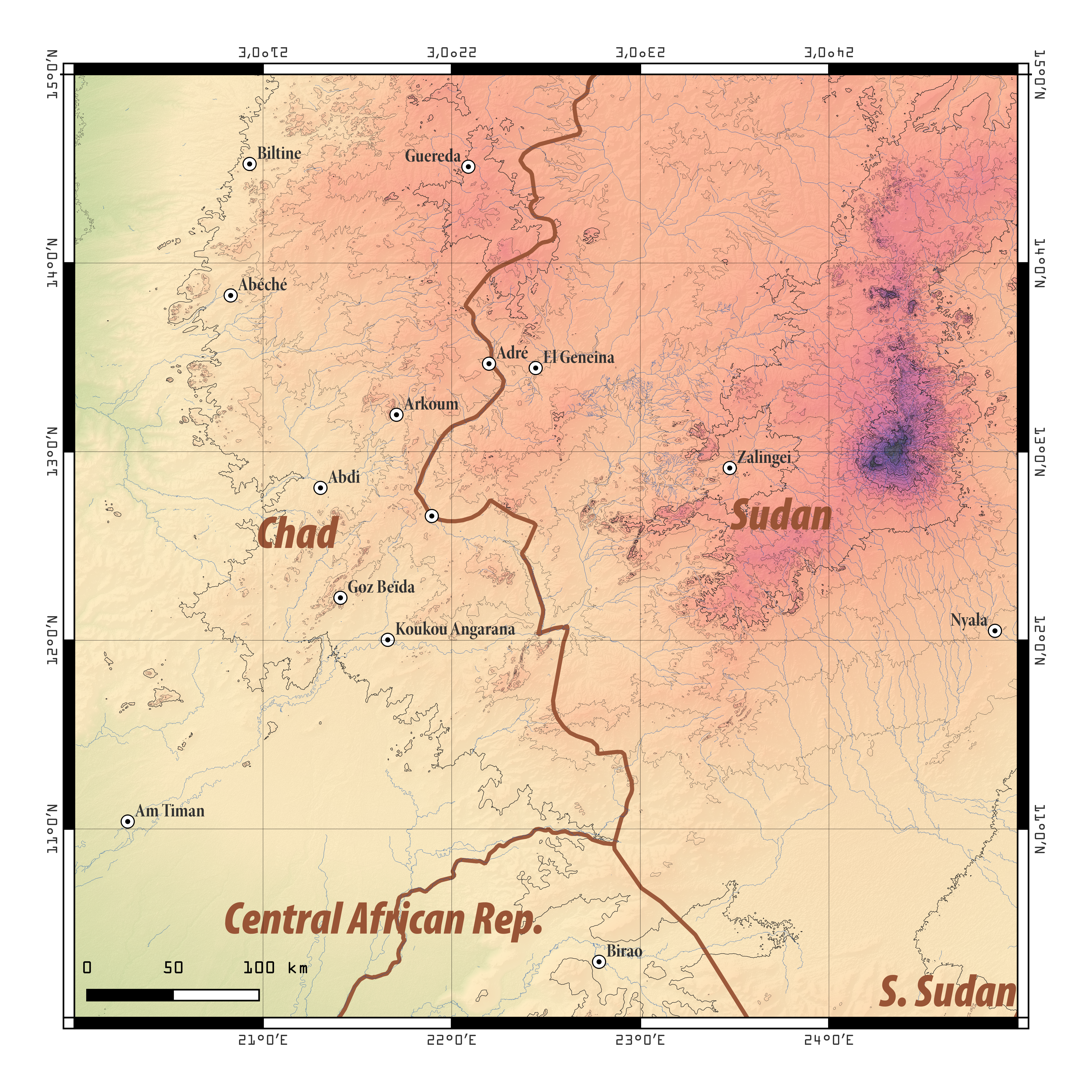
The Chad-Sudan-CAR tripoint

In 1898-99 Britain and France agreed upon their mutual spheres of influence in northern third of Africa. In the north French influence would run no further than that of a diagonal line running from the intersection of the Tropic of Cancer and the 16th meridian east to the 24th meridian east, that is, the majority of the modern Chad–Libya border. To the east the frontier would continue south along the 24th meridian down to the border of the Sultanate of Darfur in the vicinity of the 15th parallel north, whereupon it would roughly follow the border between Darfur and the Wadai Sultanate. The precise joining point of the 16th and 24th meridians (i.e. the modern Chad-Libya-Sudan tripoint) was affirmed at the Anglo-French Convention of 8 September 1919. The AEF-Anglo-Egyptian Sudan boundary was demarcated on the ground by an Anglo-French commission in 1921-23 and the final border ratified on 21 January 1924. In 1935 France and Italy signed a treaty which would have awarded the Aouzou Strip to Italian Libya, thus shifting the tripoint south, however this treaty was never ratified.

On 1 January 1956 Anglo-Egyptian Sudan declared independence as the Republic of Sudan; Chad followed later on 11 August 1960 and the border then became an international frontier between two independent states. Since then relations between the two states have often been tense, with each accusing the other of harbouring rebel groups which are allowed to cross the boundary. For instance, Sudan offered the FROLINAT rebel group sanctuary in western Sudan during the Chadian Civil War (1965–1979), and later the Patriotic Salvation Movement of current Chadian president Idriss Déby, who invaded Chad from his base in Darfur in 1990 and overthrew president Hissène Habré in the 1990 Chadian coup d'état. Relations steadily deteriorated in later years as Chad became caught up in the War in Darfur, resulting in large numbers of refugees crossing the border. Following an attack on the Chadian border town of Adré in 2005 by Chadian rebel group the Rally for Democracy and Liberty, Chad publicly accused Sudan of backing the group. The subsequent proxy war between Chad and Sudan resulted in numerous cross-border incursions and fighting, until a peace treaty was arranged in 2010.

== Settlements near the border ==
=== Chad ===
- Bahaï
- Teriba
- Mayba
- Sogoni
- Guéréda
- Birak
- Bali
- Ardemi
- Goundou
- Kawa
- Toumtouma
- Biske
- Adré
- Amdjereme
- Borota
- Ambakali
- Gargounyou
- Goz Merem
- Hilleket
- Kirana
- Bir Kandji
- Am Leiouna
- Adé
- Moudouga
- Chuchumoru
- Hadjer Beid
- Madoyna
- Madoua
- Niarinion
- Arday
- Mongororo
- Gabasour
- Kedet
- Bourtoutou
- Nzili

=== Sudan ===
- Likoyla
- Karnoi
- Tandubayah
- Girgira
- Melmelli
- Geneina
- Misterei
- Tabbi Nyebbei
- Beida
- Chero Kasi
- Habilah
- Bandadito
- Foro Burunga
- Babil
- Timassi
- Kango Haraza

== See also ==
- Chad-Sudan relations
