= Adré Airport =

- IATA: none; ICAO: none

Summary
- Airport type: Public
- Serves: Adré
- Location: Chad
- Elevation AMSL: 2,582 ft (787 m)
- Coordinates: 13°28′50.7″N 022°10′43.6″E

Map
- Location of Adré Airport in Chad

Runways
Direction	Length		Surface
Direction	ft	m	Surface
07/25	4,290	1,308	Dirt
- Source: Landings.com

Adré Airport is a public use airport located near Adré, Ouaddaï, Chad.

== See also ==
- List of airports in Chad
