= Chadian Ground Forces =

Land warfare branch of Chad's military

The Chadian Ground Forces (Arabic: القوات البرية التشادية, French: Armée de terre tchadienne) are the main and largest component of the Chadian National Army. Historically Chad has had one of the strongest armies in the Sahara region, larger than the Malian or Central African army, with a total of 25,000 to 30,000 troops. Chad has been involved as part of the Multinational Joint Task Force in fighting the Boko Haram insurgency, deploying troops to Niger and Mali. Another common role of the Chadian Army has been quelling rebellions against the central government of Chad.

== Structure ==
- Defense and Security Zone
  - No. 1 (Fada)
  - No. 2 (Ouaddaï)
  - No. 3
  - No. 4
  - No. 5
  - No. 6 (Bardaï)
  - No. 7 (Faya-Largeau)
  - No. 8 (Amdjarass)
- Armored Battalion
- Infantry Battalion
- Artillery Battalion
- Engineer Battalion
- Special Forces Unit
- Rapid Intervention Force (FIR)

== Equipment ==
=== Small arms ===
Name	Image	Caliber	Type	Origin	Notes
Pistols
Tokagypt 58		9×19mm	Semi-automatic pistol	Soviet Union / Hungarian People's Republic	Hungarian copy of the Soviet TT pistol for Egypt in 9mm Parabellum caliber.
MAC Mle 1950		9×19mm	Semi-automatic pistol	French Fourth Republic / French Fourth Republic	
MAB PA-15		9×19mm	Semi-automatic pistol	France	
Walther P1		9×19mm	Semi-automatic pistol	Nazi Germany / West Germany	
Walther PP		.25 ACP	Semi-automatic pistol	Weimar RepublicNazi Germany West Germany / Germany	
Browning Hi-Power		9×19mm	Semi-automatic pistol	Belgium / United States	
Manurhin MR 73		.357 Magnum	Revolver	France	
Submachine guns
Uzi		9×19mm	Submachine gun	Israel	
MAT-49		9×19mm	Submachine gun	French Fourth Republic / French Fifth Republic	
Rifles
AK		7.62×39mm	Assault rifle	Soviet Union	
AKM		7.62×39mm	Assault rifle	Soviet Union	
AK-74		5.45×39mm	Assault rifle	Soviet Union	
Type 56		7.62×39mm	Assault rifle	China	
IMI Galil		5.56×45mm	Assault rifle	Israel	Delivered in 2006
IWI Galil ACE		5.56×45mm	Assault rifle	Israel	
IWI Tavor		5.56×45mm	Bullpup; Assault rifle	Israel	
FAMAS		5.56×45mm	Bullpup; Assault rifle	France	
FN FAL		7.62×51mm	Battle rifle	Belgium	
CETME Model C		7.62×51mm	Battle rifle	Francoist Spain / Spanish transition to democracy	
Heckler & Koch G3		7.62×51mm	Battle rifle	West Germany/ Germany	
SIG SG 542		7.62×51mm	Battle rifle	Switzerland	
MAS-36		7.5×54mm	Bolt-action rifle	French Third Republic /French Fourth Republic	
Zastava M48		7.92×57mm	Bolt-action rifle	Yugoslavia	
Machine guns
RPD		7.62×39mm	Squad automatic weapon	Soviet Union	
RPK		7.62×39mm	Squad automatic weapon	Soviet Union	
PKM		7.62×54mmR	General-purpose machine gun	Soviet Union	
DShK		12.7×108mm	Heavy machine gun	Soviet Union	
FN MAG		7.62×51mm	General-purpose machine gun	Belgium	
Browning M2		.50 BMG	Heavy machine gun	United States	
Rocket propelled grenade launchers
RPG-7		40mm	Rocket-propelled grenade	Soviet Union	
RPG-18		64mm	Rocket-propelled grenade	Soviet Union	
Grenade launchers
LRAC F1		83mm	Shoulder-launched missile weapon	France	
M79		40×46mm	Grenade launcher	United States	
AGS-17		30×29mm	Automatic grenade launcher	Soviet Union	

=== Anti-tank weapons ===
Name	Image	Type	Origin	Caliber	Notes
B-10		Recoilless rifle	Soviet Union	82mm	
M18		Recoilless rifle	United States	57mm	
M40A1		Recoilless rifle	United States	106mm	
MILAN		Anti-tank missile	France; West Germany / Germany		469 in service
Eryx		Anti-tank missile	France		
BGM-71 TOW		Anti-tank missile	United States		

=== Anti-aircraft weapons ===
Name	Image	Type	Origin	Quantity	Notes
ZPU		Anti-aircraft gun	Soviet Union	Unknown	ZPU-1, ZPU-2 and ZPU-4 variants
ZU-23-2		Anti-aircraft gun	Soviet Union	Unknown	
ZSU-23-4 Shilka		SPAAG	Soviet Union	6	
2K12 Kub		Surface-to-air missile	Soviet Union	4 Launchers (1 battery)	
9K32 Strela-2		MANPADS	Soviet Union	Unknown	
9K38 Igla		MANPADS	Soviet Union	50	
FIM-92 Stinger		MANPADS	United States	Unknown	

=== Artillery ===
Name	Image	Type	Origin	Quantity	Notes
Self-propelled artillery
2S1 Gvozdika		Self-propelled artillery	Soviet Union	10	
Rocket artillery
BM-21 Grad		Multiple rocket launcher	Soviet Union	6	
Type 63		Multiple rocket launcher	China	Unknown	
PHL-81		Multiple rocket launcher	China	5	
Field artillery
D-74		Field gun	Soviet Union	8	
M101		Howitzer	United States	5	
MO-120-AM50		Mortar	France	10	
BM-37		Mortar	Soviet Union	Unknown	

=== Tanks ===
Name	Image	Type	Origin	Quantity	Notes
Type 59G		Main battle tank	China / Bangladesh	30	
T-55		Medium tank	Soviet Union	60	

=== Tank destroyers ===
Name	Image	Type	Origin	Quantity	Notes
WMA-301		Tank destroyer	China	30	

=== Infantry fighting vehicles ===
Name	Image	Type	Origin	Quantity	Notes
BMP-1		Infantry fighting vehicle	Soviet Union	80	
BMP-1U		Infantry fighting vehicle	Soviet Union / Ukraine	42	

=== Reconnaissance ===
Name	Image	Type	Origin	Quantity	Notes
BRDM-2		Amphibious armored scout car	Soviet Union	100	
Cadillac V-150		Armored car	United States	9	
Panhard AML		Armored car Scout car	France	132	AML-60 and AML-90 variants
Eland-90		Armored car Scout car	South Africa	82	
ERC-90F1 Lynx		Armored car Scout car	France	4	
EE-9 Cascavel		Armored car Scout car	Military dictatorship in Brazil	20	
RAM MK3		Reconnaissance vehicle	Israel	42	Delivered in 2006-2008

=== Armored personnel carriers ===
Name	Image	Type	Origin	Quantity	Notes
BTR-60		Armored personnel carrier	Soviet Union	20	
BTR-80		Armored personnel carrier	Soviet Union	24	
BTR-3E		Armored personnel carrier	Ukraine	12	
WZ-523		Armored personnel carrier	China	10	
Panhard M3		Armored personnel carrier	France	15	
VAB-VTT		Armored personnel carrier	France	25	Delivered by France in 2008
Bastion PATSAS		Armored personnel carrier	France	22	Delivered in 2013
ZFB-05		Infantry mobility vehicle	China	10	Delivered in 2007
Otokar Cobra		Infantry mobility vehicle	Turkey	20	
Carat Black Scorpion		Infantry mobility vehicle	Belgium	10	
Terrier LT-79		Infantry mobility vehicle	United States	60	

=== Mine-resistant ambush protected vehicles ===
Name	Image	Type	Origin	Quantity	Notes
Ejder Yalçın		MRAP	Turkey	20	
ARA II		MRAP	Nigeria	8	

=== Utility vehicles ===
Name	Image	Type	Origin	Quantity	Notes
ACMAT VLRA		Utility vehicle	France	Unknown	
ACMAT AVTL		Utility vehicle	France	20	
HMMWV		Light utility vehicle	United States	Unknown	Vehicles sold under the U.S. Foreign Military Sales program
M151		Utility vehicle	United States	Unknown	
Toyota Land Cruiser		Utility vehicle	Japan	Unknown	
Trucks
M35A2		Utility truck	United States	Unknown	
Renault Trucks D		Utility truck	France	Unknown	
