= Yaya Dillo Djérou =

Chadian politician (1974–2024)

Yaya Dillo Djérou Bétchi
- يحيى ديلو جيرو
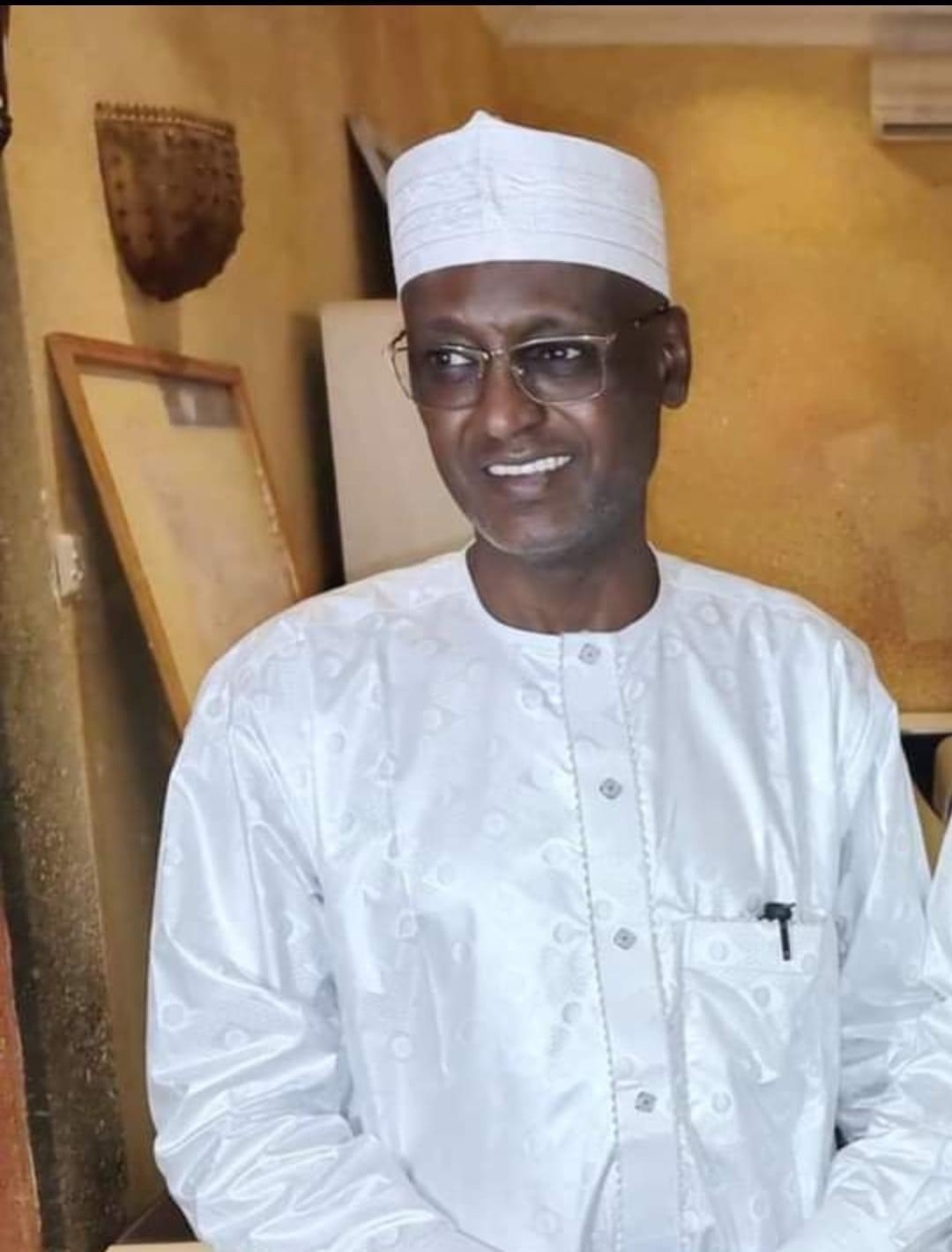

Minister of Mines and Energy
- In office September 2008 – March 2009

Ambassador of Chad to the Economic and Monetary Community of Central Africa
- In office 2018–2020

Leader of Socialist Party without Borders
- In office 6 August 2021 – 28 February 2024
- Preceded by: Dinamou Daram
- Succeeded by: TBD

Personal details
- Born: 18 December 1974; Kaoura, Chad
- Died: 28 February 2024 (aged 49); N'Djamena, Chad
- Manner of death: Assassination
- Political party: MPS; PSF
- Education: University of Ottawa

Yaya Dillo Djérou Bétchi (Arabic: يحيى ديلو جيرو; 18 December 1974 – 28 February 2024) was a Chadian politician, and president of the opposition Socialist Party Without Borders in 2021 until his assassination in 2024. He was a cousin of President Mahamat Déby and a major opponent of Déby in the 2024 presidential elections. Shortly after the date of the 2024 elections was announced, Dillo was killed in a reported exchange of fire with government security forces after allegedly leading an attack on the National State Security Agency.

== Early life and education ==
Born on 18 December 1974, in Kaoura, Ennedi-Est, Chad, a teenaged Dillo participated in an offensive that culminated in Idriss Déby ousting President Hissène Habré in a coup d'état in 1990.

After the coup, Dillo obtained a bachelor's degree in mathematics, then received a degree in electrical engineering and telecommunications from the University of Ottawa.

== Chadian Civil War (2005–2010) ==
On 14 October 2005, the government of Idriss Déby admitted that there were desertions in the army, especially by the Zaghawa, the President's ethnic group. These deserters were under the leadership of Dillo; based in the Sudanese region of Darfur. Dillo, a former telecommunications engineer, had left Déby's party MPS and become president of a revolutionary junta ("président du collège révolutionnaire") heading an organization called Platform for Change, Unity and Democracy (SCUD), a rebel alliance. The group declared its plans to overthrow Déby, and is of Zaghawa ethnicity. To open negotiations with the government, he demanded that all political prisoners be freed.

Dillo subsequently laid down arms to become a cabinet minister in Déby's government, serving as Minister of Mines and Energy from September 2008 to March 2009.

== Later career ==
From 2018 to 2020, Dillo was Ambassador of Chad to the Economic and Monetary Community of Central Africa. Dismissed after the start of the COVID-19 pandemic, he spoke out against a "conflict of interest" between the Grand Cœur foundation, run by First Lady Hinda Déby Itno and the Chadian government. He was then sued by the foundation for defamation.

On 28 February 2021, security forces raided Dillo's home in N'Djamena, killing five of his relatives, including his mother and son. A government statement said the raid was an operation to arrest him. Two other people were also killed and five wounded in the ensuing fight. The next week, three candidates in the presidential election withdrew in protest and fear of similar consequences. The attacks were condemned by the African Union, and French Minister for Europe and Foreign Affairs Jean-Yves Le Drian called on an impartial investigation into the incident.

On 6 August 2021, Dillo was named president of the Socialist Party without Borders, replacing founder Dinamou Daram, who was serving a jail sentence.

== Death ==
On 28 February 2024, a shooting outside the offices of the Chadian intelligence services in N'Djamena caused several deaths. The Chadian government blamed the Socialist Party Without Borders (PSF), headed by Dillo. Oumar Mahamat Kedelaye, Chad's national prosecutor, alleged that Dillo led a well-armed group of men in 11 vehicles during the shooting. This attack came after the arrest of Ahmed Torabi, a PSF member accused of trying to assassinate the president of the Supreme Court, and a day after the announcement that the presidential elections would be held on 6 May. Dillo, a cousin of President Mahamat Déby, was expected to be a contender.

After the news of both the shooting and Torabi's arrest emerged, Dillo claimed that the attacks were staged by the Chadian government. Dillo said that Torabi was executed by security forces after his arrest, with his body being placed outside the offices of the Chadian intelligence services. Other PSF members and Torabi's relatives went there to retrieve his body, but were ambushed by soldiers, resulting in several deaths.

In response, military vehicles surrounded the PSF headquarters amid heavy gunfire. According to an internet watchdog Netblocks, connectivity was restricted. Dillo was killed after his party's office was besieged by the Chadian Army amid unrest over the elections. His party alleged he was "assassinated by the Republican Guard." Chadian communications minister Abderaman Koulamallah said, "[Dillo] didn't want to surrender and fired on law enforcement." Amnesty International argued that the government's account of what happened between the earlier attack on the Supreme Court and Dillo's death left much unclear.

Following Yaya Dillo Djérou's demise, his younger brother Ousman Dillo organized a rebel group and joined the ongoing insurgency against the Déby government.
