= Borut =

Borut may refer to:

People

- Borut Bilač (born 1965), Slovenian long jumper
- Borut Božič (born 1980), Slovenian professional road racing cyclist
- Borut Javornik (born 1967), Slovenian slalom canoer
- Borut Justin, Slovenian slalom canoer
- Borut Mavrič (born 1970), Slovenian international footballer
- Borut Pahor (born 1963), Slovenian politician, Prime Minister of Slovenia from 2008 to 2012
- Borut Petrič (born 1961), Slovenian freestyle swimmer
- Borut Semler (born 1985), Slovenian footballer
- Borut Urh (born 1974), Slovenian professional tennis player

Places

- Borut, Bosnia and Herzegovina, a village near Neum
- Borut, Croatia, a village near Cerovlje, Istria County

== See also ==
- Borat (disambiguation)
- Borot (disambiguation)
