= Chadian National Gendarmerie =

Branch of the Military of Chad

The Chadian National Gendarmerie (CNG, Arabic: قوات الدرك الوطني التشادي) is the branch of the Military of Chad in charge of judicial policing, administrative policing, and military policing. Created by decree of August 17, 1961 No. 2 following the independence of Chad, it was directly inspired by the French National Gendarmerie. In 2014, it had 8,500 soldiers.

== History ==
Until 1960, the French Equatorial Africa Gendarmerie Detachment (FEA), a member of the French National Gendarmerie, carried out gendarmerie missions in Chad, then a French colony. The detachment was successively transformed into a section in 1949, a company in 1955, and then a group.

Having become an autonomous republic on November 28, 1958, Chad gained independence on August 11, 1960. The Chadian National Gendarmerie was then officially created by a decree of August 17, 1961. (Note: Décret No. 93-050/PR/MDPRC/DNACVG/93 du 5 février 1993)

In 1982, the Gendarmerie was briefly transformed into a military police force, before definitively returning to its previous status in 19901. Its general organization was then established by a decree of 14 April 1992N 4.1. In 1993, a decree divided the Chadian territory into eight gendarmerie districts, (Note: Décret No. 93-050/PR/MDPRC/DNACVG/93 du 5 février 1993) and in 1994, the command of the National Gendarmerie became the General Directorate of the National Gendarmerie1. The 1996 Constitution then devoted a chapter to the National Gendarmerie.

In 2013, after the dissolution of the United Nations Integrated Security Detachment (DIS), the Gendarmerie was given responsibility for ensuring the security of Sudanese refugees, displaced Chadians and humanitarian personnel. Since the country's independence, the Chadian National Gendarmerie has participated in several civil wars and intercommunity conflicts. On December 16, 2022, the CNG was placed under the command of the Chadian Ministry of Public Safety and Immigration (Arabic:وزارة السلامة العامة والهجرة).

== Activities ==
The Chadian National Gendarmerie has participated in military parades celebrating Chad's Independence Day and the Day of Freedom and Democracy. As of March of 2026, Chadian government planned to deploy 800 National Police and Gendarmerie personnel in Haiti to help the Haitian National Police combat armed gangs, as part of the United Nations-backed anti-gang task force operating there.

== Ranks ==
=== Officers ===
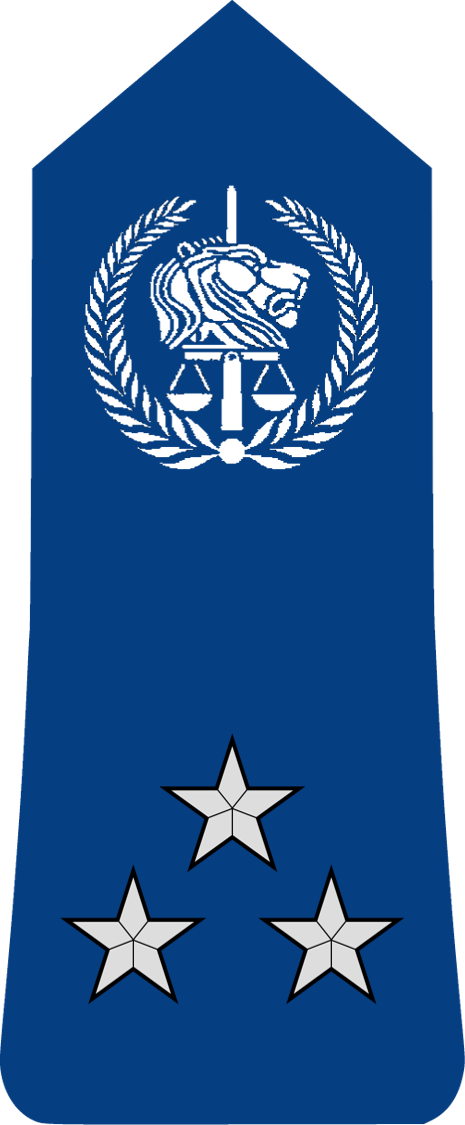
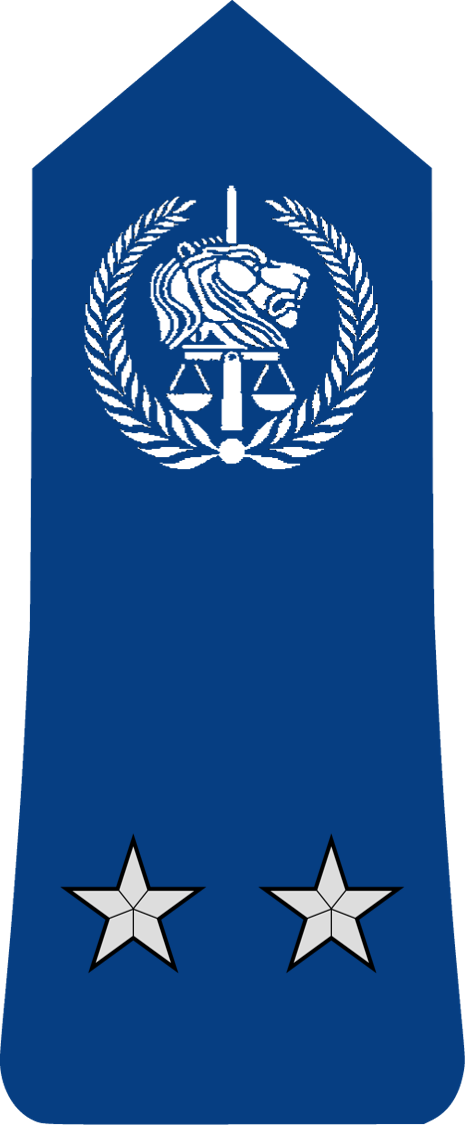
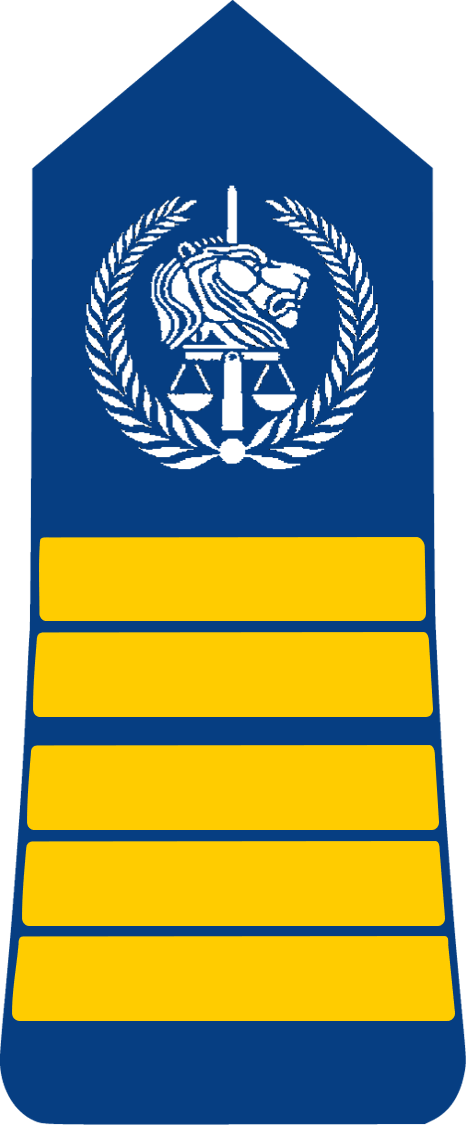
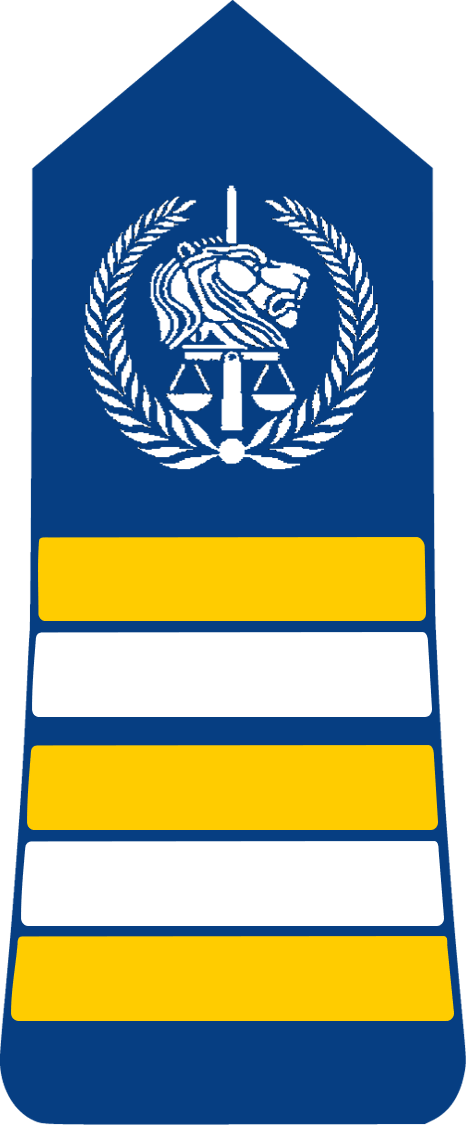
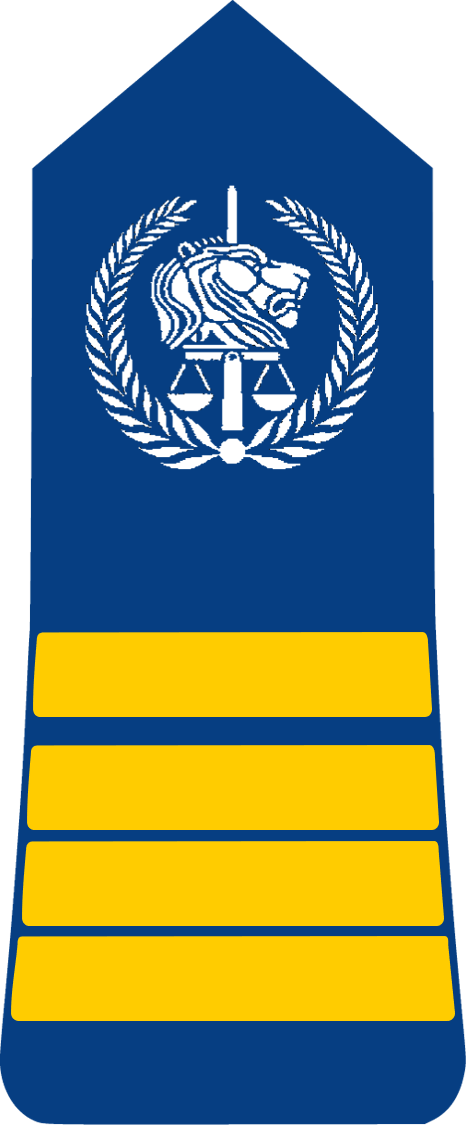
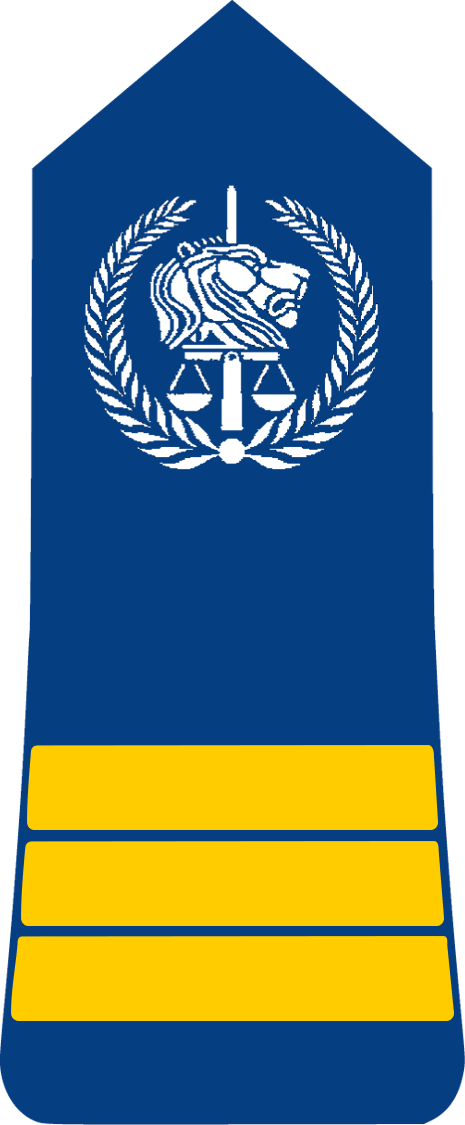
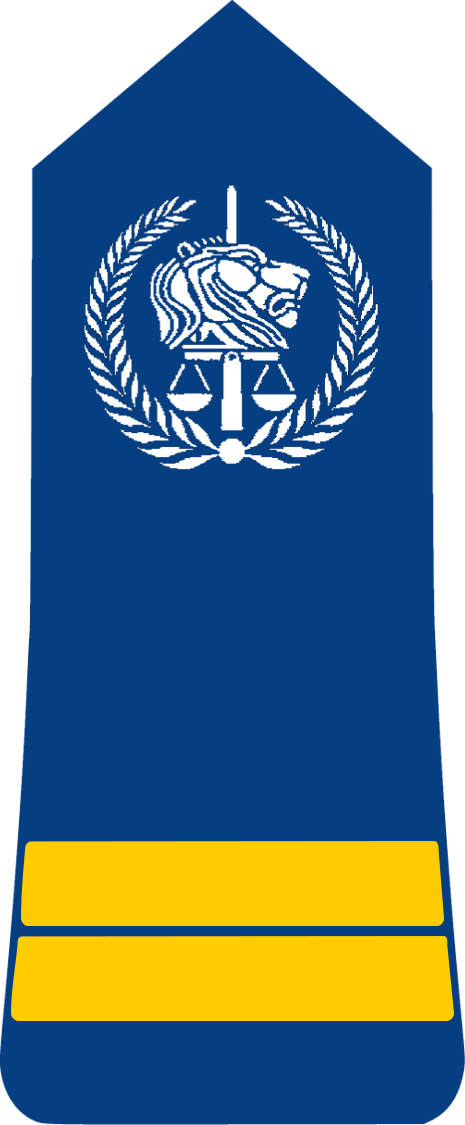
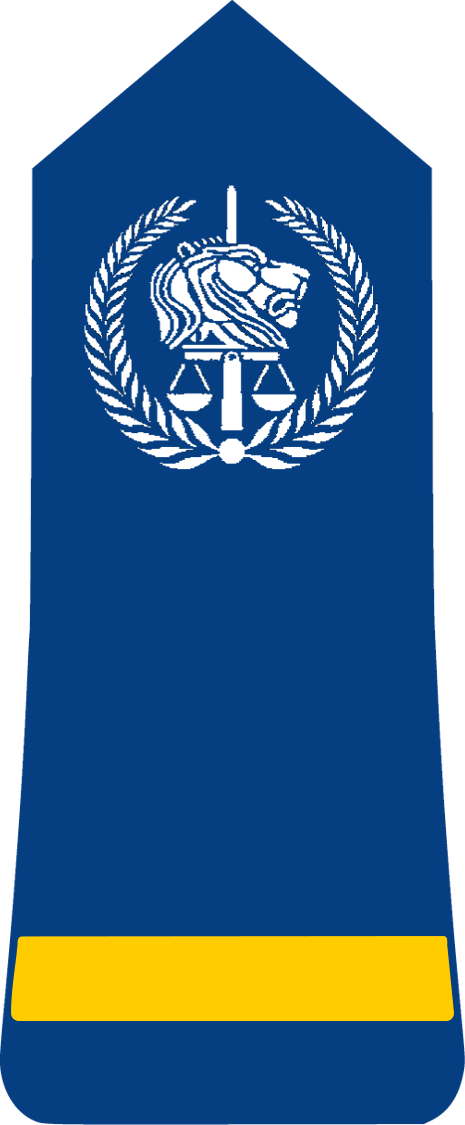
Rank group	General / flag officers		Senior officers			Junior officers
Chadian National Gendarmerie
Chadian National Gendarmerie	Général de division	Général de brigade	Colonel	Lieutenant-Colonel	Commandant	Capitaine	Lieutenant	Sous-Lieutenant

=== Enlisted ===
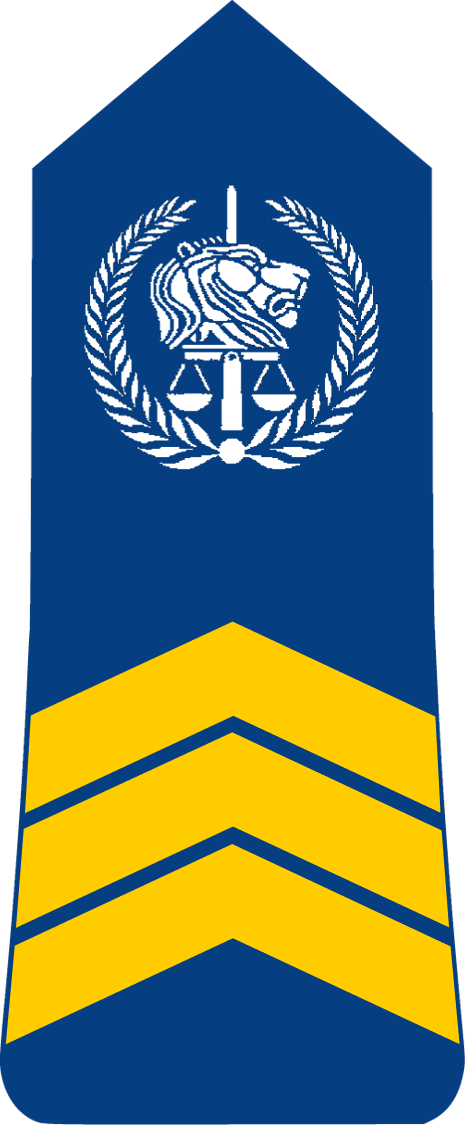
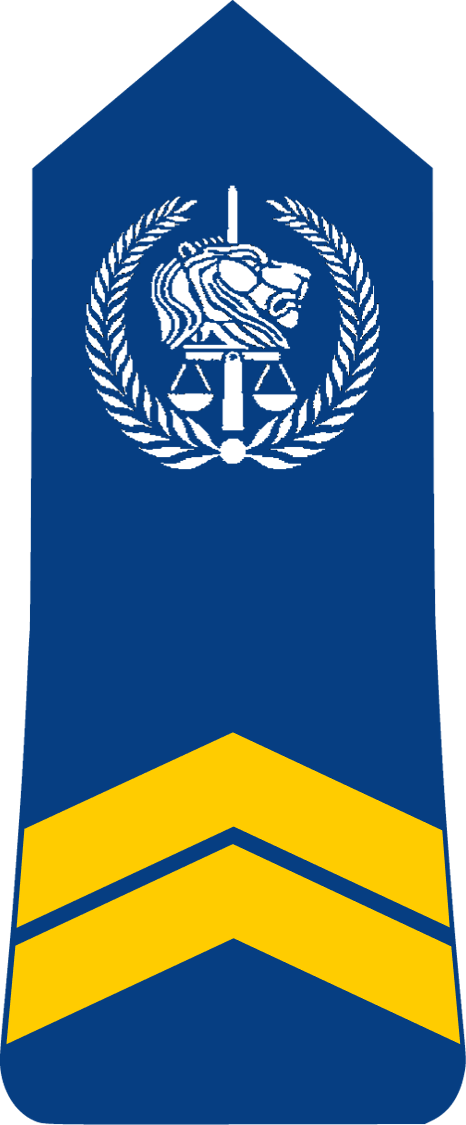
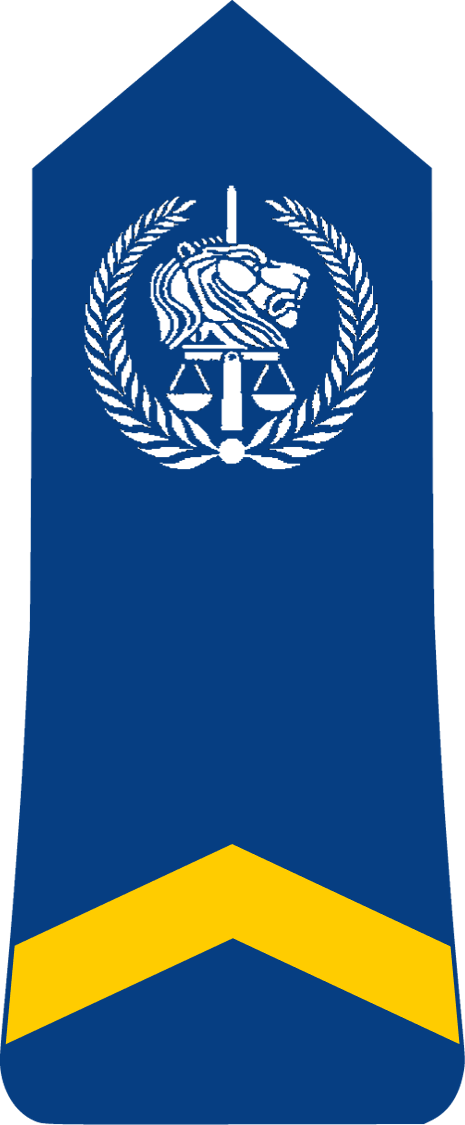
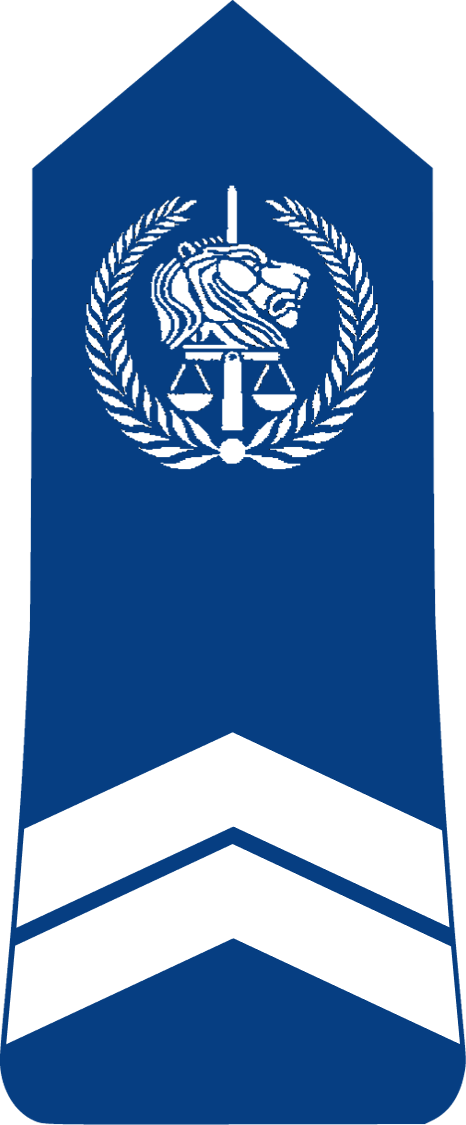
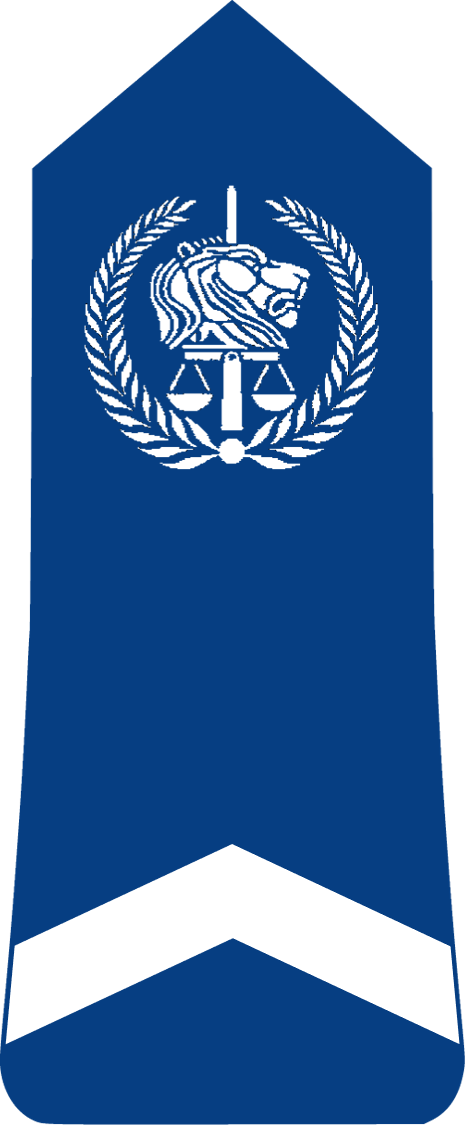
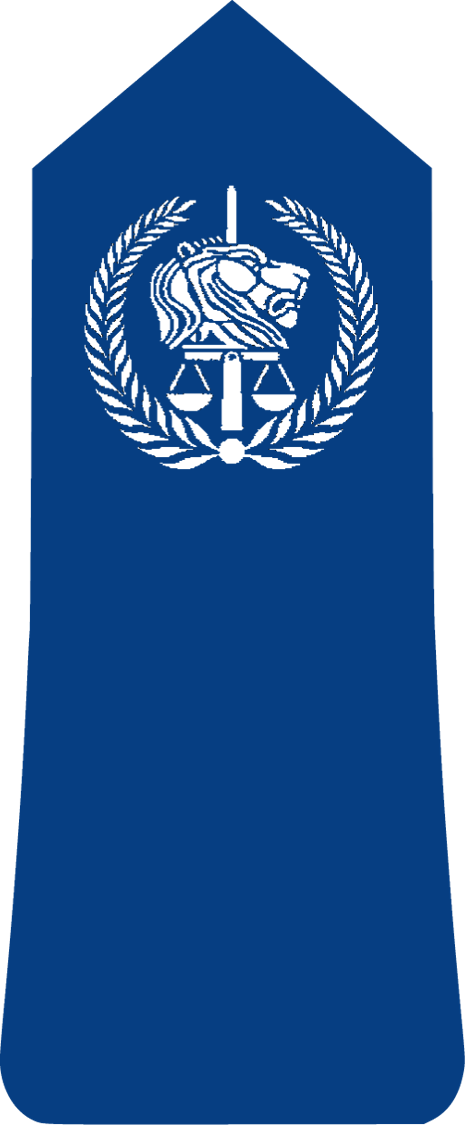
Rank group	Senior NCOs			Junior NCOs	Enlisted
Chadian National Gendarmerie
Chadian National Gendarmerie	Sergent major	Sergent-chef	Sergent	Caporal	Soldat première	Soldat
