= Borot =

Borot may refer to:

People

- Mickaël Borot (born 1975), French Taekwondo athlete

Fiction

- Boss Borot mecha character from the anime and manga series Mazinger Z
- Borot, character in Power Quest (video game)

== See also ==
- Borat (disambiguation)
- Borut (disambiguation)
