= Rally for Democracy and Liberty =

Chadian rebel group

- Rassemblement pour la Démocratie et la Liberté
- Leader: Mahamat Nour
- Founded: August 2005
- Split from: ANR
- Ideology: Tama interests Anti-Déby
- Wars: Chadian Civil War

The Rally for Democracy and Liberty, abbreviated as R.D.L. (Rassemblement pour la Démocratie et la Liberté in French) and sometimes translated as Rally for Democracy and Freedom, is a Chadian rebel group that was formed in August 2005 by former members of the Military of Chad who deserted and united under their founder, Mohammed Nour. Their main objective was to oust former Chadian president Idriss Déby and his government. The RDL then planned to hold elections after a two-year interim period. RDL has bases in eastern Chad and in the Darfur region of Sudan. On December 18, 2005, the RDL attacked Chadian troops stationed in the city of Adre, causing the current crisis in the Chadian-Sudanese relations.
