= Opheera McDoom =

British journalist (born 1977)

Opheera McDoom (born 1977) is a journalist and Reuters correspondent. For several years, McDoom has been reporting news in Egypt and Sudan.

== Biography ==
McDoom was born and educated in London, England and graduated with a master's degree from the University of Edinburgh. She is of Guyanese descent and her name derives from her family's place of origin in the Essequibo Islands-West Demerara region of Guyana, McDoom village. She describes her surname as "a colonial mess-up," ascribed when the British mistakenly anglicized her father's family name.

=== Reuters ===
McDoom joined Reuters in September 2002. She spent one year in London before moving to Cairo in July 2003 to cover Egypt and Sudan. The agency had her establish the first Reuters bureau in Sudan since the news service vacated that country 15 years prior. The bureau now consists of two full-time journalists, two TV crews, and a stringer. She is based in Khartoum, and files reports from throughout the country.
