= Borota, Chad =

Borota بوروتا
- Location in Chad
- Coordinates: 13°0′N 21°51′E
- Country: Chad
- Region: Ouaddai Region
- Time zone: +1

Borota (Arabic: بوروتا) is a city in Chad.

== January 2006 raids ==
On January 6, 2006, Janjaweed militants crossed the border from Sudan into Chad and attacked the cities of Borota, Adé, and Moudaina. Nine civilians were killed and three were seriously injured.

The Chadian government stated, "The Sudanese militias attacked the settlements of Borota, Ade, Moudaina... yesterday killing nine and injuring three among the civilian population... The Chadian government once again warns the Sudanese government against any hasty action because aggression by Sudanese militias will not go unpunished for much longer."
