= Battle of Adré =

First battle of the Chadian Civil War of 2005–10

Coordinates: 13.4667°N 22.2000°E

- Part of the Chadian Civil War (2005–10)
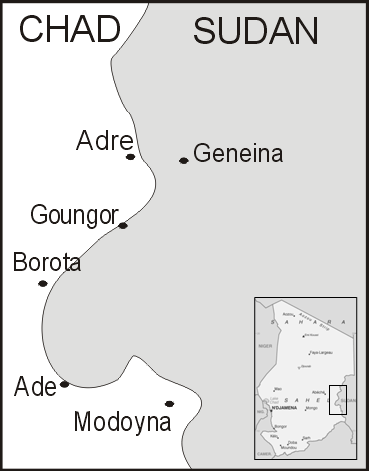
- Map of the border area with Adré
Date	18 December 2005
Location	Adré, Chad
Result	Chadian government victory

Belligerents
RDL; SCUD; Alleged support: Sudan	Chad

Commanders and leaders
100–300 killed (Chadian claim); 9 killed (RDL claim)	5 killed (Chadian claim); 70 killed (RDL claim)

The Battle of Adré took place in Adré, Chad on 18 December 2005. The battle began when the Chadian rebel groups Rally for Democracy and Liberty (RDL) and Platform for Change, Unity, and Democracy (SCUD), allegedly backed by the government of Sudan, attacked the garrison in this city. However, Chadian loyalists, who had been forewarned by military intelligence of the attack, easily repulsed the attackers. Either seventy, one hundred, or three hundred rebels were killed, depending on reports. Governmental losses are unknown, but they lost at least one Russian-made helicopter in a collision with electric wires during the fighting, while another Mil Mi-17 helicopter was heavily damaged by rebel fire which killed at least one crew member.

On 19 December, SCUD leader Yaya Dillo Djérou said, "A few of our troops have participated in the action in Adré, but it is being led by the RDL. Yesterday we took control of the city."
