= Adré =

Adre أدري
- Town
- Location in Chad
- Coordinates: 13°28′02″N 22°11′48″E
- Country: Chad
- Region: Ouaddaï Region
- Department: Assoungha
- Sub-Prefecture: Adré
- Elevation: 2,605 ft (794 m)

Population (2008)
  - Total: 12 571
- Time zone: UTC+01:00 (WAT)

Adré (Arabic: أدري) is the main town of the Assoungha department in the Ouaddaï Region of Chad. It is located very close to Chad's eastern border with Sudan, 400m away. The town is served by Adré Airport.

== History ==
The Chadian-Sudanese conflict began on December 23, 2005, when the government of Chad declared a state of war with Sudan and called for the citizens of Chad to mobilize themselves against the "common enemy", by which term the Chadian government referred to Rally for Democracy and Liberty (RDL) militants, who were Chadian rebels backed by the Sudanese government, and Sudanese militiamen. Militants had attacked villages and towns in eastern Chad, stealing cattle, murdering citizens, and burning houses. Over 200,000 refugees from the Darfur region of northwestern Sudan claimed asylum in eastern Chad. Chadian president Idriss Déby accused Sudanese President Omar Hasan Ahmad al-Bashir of trying to "destabilize our country, to drive our people into misery, to create disorder and export the war from Darfur to Chad."

An attack on Adré led to the deaths of either one hundred rebels or three hundred rebels as CNN reported. The Sudanese government was blamed for the attack, which was the second in the region in three days, but Sudanese foreign ministry spokesman Jamal Mohammed Ibrahim denies any Sudanese involvement. "We are not for any escalation with Chad. We technically deny involvement in Chadian internal affairs." This attack was the final straw that led to the declaration of belligerence by Chad and the alleged deployment of the Chadian airforce into Sudanese airspace, which the Chadian government denied.

Adré was attacked again on February 3, 2007. Fighting raged for hours between government troops and a coalition of four rebel groups including the United Forces for Democracy and Development. The government claimed that Sudan was responsible for the attack.

== Demographics ==
Year	Population
1993	8 783
2008	12 571
