= Chadian National Army =

Combined military forces of Chad

- الجيش الوطني التشادي (Arabic); Armée nationale tchadienne (French)
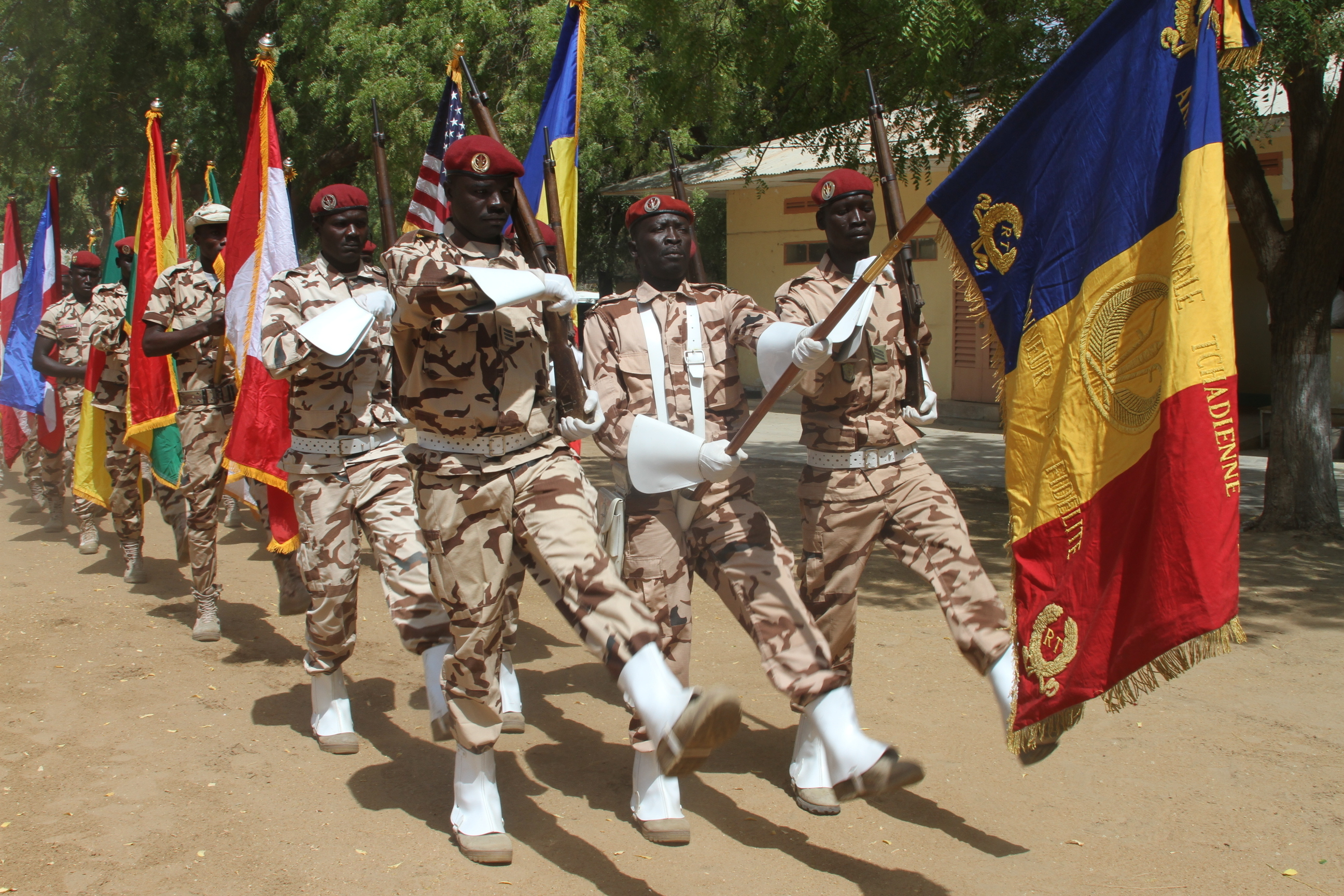
- Flag of the Chadian National Army
- Motto: Honneur et fidélité ("Honor and fidelity")
- Founded: 27 May 1961
- Service branches: Ground Forces; Air Force; Gendarmerie
- Headquarters: N'Djamena

Leadership
- Commander-in-Chief: Mahamat Déby
- Minister of Defence: Dago Yacouba
- Chief of the General Staff: Lt. Gen. Abakar Abdelkerim Daoud

Personnel
- Military age: 18 years of age
- Conscription: Yes
- Active personnel: 37,750 (2024)

Expenditure
- Budget: US$352 million (2023)
- Percent of GDP: 2.9 (2023)

Industry
- Foreign suppliers: Belgium; Brazil; China; France; Germany; Hungary; Israel; Italy; Russia; Switzerland; South Africa; Serbia; Turkey; Nigeria; Ukraine; United States

Related articles
- History: Military history of Chad: Chadian Civil War (1965–1979) Chadian–Libyan conflict Second Congo War Chadian Civil War (2005–2010) Mali War Chadian intervention in northern Mali Boko Haram insurgency Insurgency in Northern Chad 2021 Northern Chad offensive Haitian conflict
- Ranks: Military ranks of Chad

The Chadian National Army (Arabic: الجيش الوطني التشادي, romanized: Al-Jaish al-Watani at-Tshadi; French: Armée nationale tchadienne, ANT) consists of the five Defence and Security Forces listed in Article 185 of the Chadian Constitution that came into effect on 4 May 2018. These are the National Army (including Ground Forces and Air Force), the National Gendarmerie, the National Police, the National and Nomadic Guard (GNNT), and the Judicial Police. Article 188 of the Constitution specifies that National Defence is the responsibility of the Army, Gendarmerie and GNNT, whilst the maintenance of public order and security is the responsibility of the Police, Gendarmerie and GNNT. There is also the General Directorate of the Security Services of State Institutions (DGSSIE), with the functions of presidential security, military intelligence, and counterterrorism; it answers directly to the president of Chad.

As of 2024, there were an estimated 27,500 soldiers in the Ground Forces, 350 in the Air Force, and 4,500 in the Gendarmerie. There were also 5,400 in the DGSSIE, for a total strength of 37,750 personnel. Other estimates put the total strength of the Chadian National Army, including the DGSSIE, somewhere between 35,000 and 40,000 personnel.

Historically, Chad's military was known as the Chadian Armed Forces (FAT) from independence until 1983, when Hissène Habré took power from the transitional government, and then as the Chadian National Armed Forces (FANT) from then until Habré was overthrown by Idriss Déby in 1990. The military is known for being involved in the country's politics. After the death of President Idriss Déby in 2021 during a rebel offensive, his son Mahamat Déby, who was a military commander, took office as his successor, initially as the leader of the Transitional Military Council. The Chadian National Army has been focused on counterinsurgency operations against rebel groups within the country and Islamic insurgents that are located in the Lake Chad region.

Chad has an essential role in regional security, with its army often described as the most capable in the Sahel, and it is an active member of the G5 Sahel and the Multinational Joint Task Force. It was also the largest contributor to MINUSMA, the United Nations mission in Mali. The Chadian military has combat experience in recent decades from fighting domestic rebel groups, protecting Chad's borders during instability in Libya and Sudan, and combat tours in Mali, Nigeria, Burkina Faso, Niger, and the Central African Republic. France had a military presence in Chad from its independence in 1960 until 2025, when the last French base was given over to the Chadian National Army. The French Armed Forces had a significant role in training some Chadian units.

== History ==
=== Founding and early conflicts ===
The first president of Chad, François Tombalbaye, established the nation's military on 27 May 1961. From independence through the period of the presidency of Félix Malloum (1975–79), the official national army was known as the Chadian Armed Forces (Forces Armées Tchadiennes—FAT). Composed mainly of soldiers from southern Chad, FAT had its roots in the army recruited by France and had military traditions dating back to World War I. FAT lost its status as the legal state army when Malloum's civil and military administration disintegrated in 1979. Although it remained a distinct military body for several years, FAT was eventually reduced to the status of a regional army representing the south.

After Habré consolidated his authority and assumed the presidency in 1982, his victorious army, the Armed Forces of the North (Forces Armées du Nord—FAN), became the nucleus of a new national army. The force was officially constituted in January 1983, when the various pro-Habré contingents were merged and renamed the Chadian National Armed Forces (Forces Armées Nationales Tchadiennes—FANT).

The military of Chad was dominated by members of Toubou, Zaghawa, Kanembou, Hadjerai, and Massa ethnic groups during the presidency of Hissène Habré. Later Chadian president Idriss Déby revolted and fled to the Sudan, taking with him many Zaghawa and Hadjerai soldiers in 1989.

=== Déby administrations ===
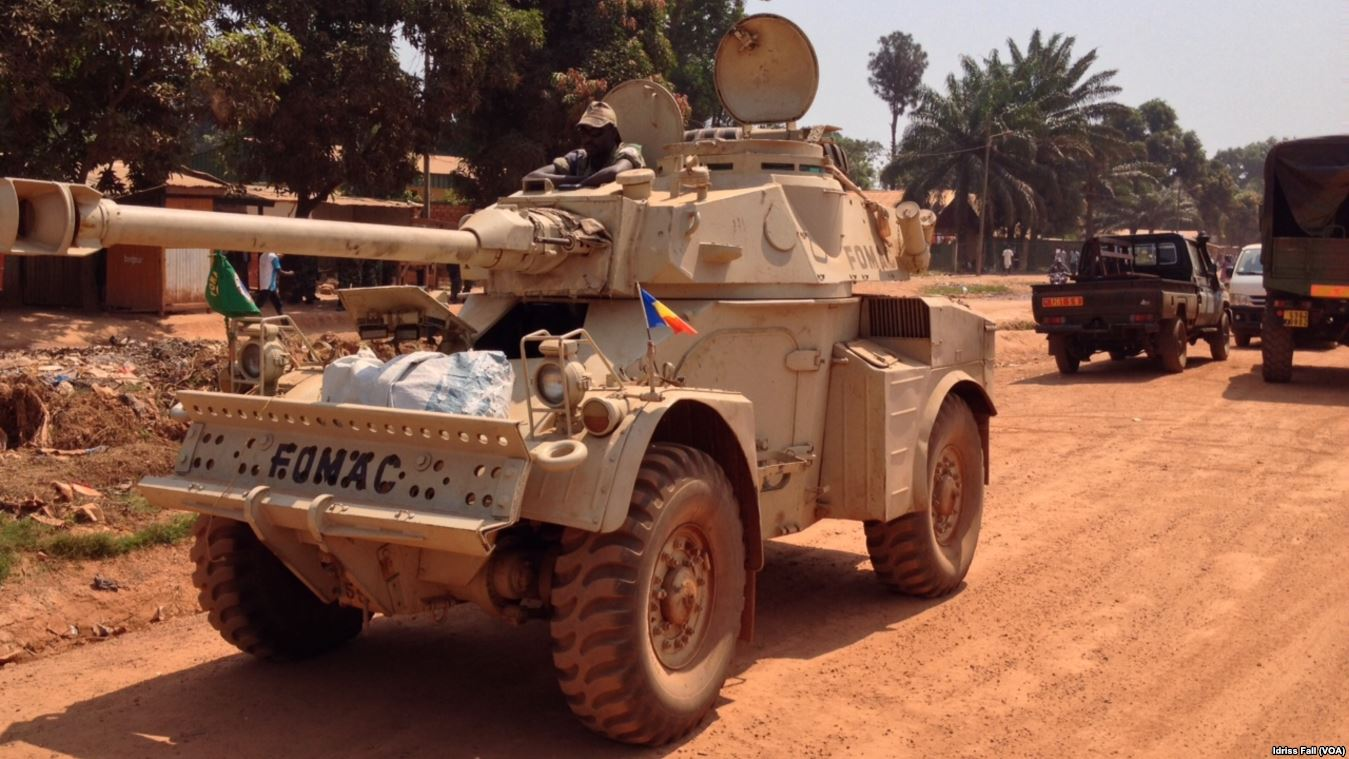
Chadian Eland Mk7 armoured car in Bangui, Central African Republic, in 2013

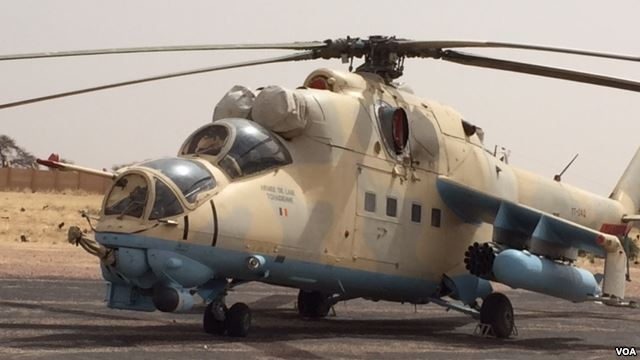
Chadian Air Force Mil Mi-24 at Diffa Airport, Niger, in 2015

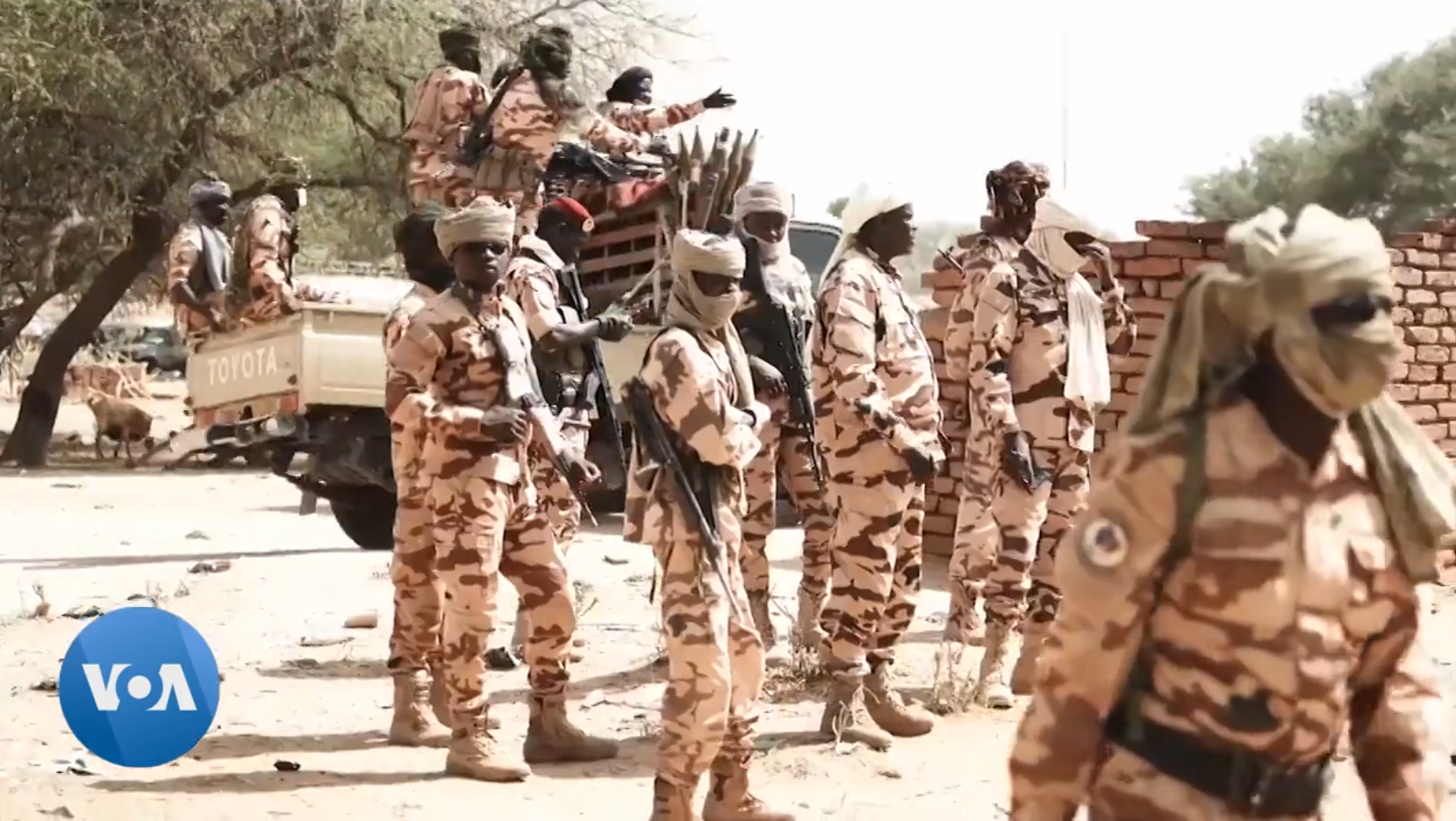
Chadian troops at the border with Sudan as refugees flee the Sudanese civil war in 2023

Chad's armed forces numbered about 36,000 at the end of the Habré regime, but swelled to an estimated 50,000 in the early days of Déby's rule. With French support, a reorganization of the armed forces was initiated early in 1991 with the goal of reducing its numbers and making its ethnic composition reflective of the country as a whole. Neither of these goals was achieved, and the military is still dominated by the Zaghawa.

In 2004, the government discovered that many of the soldiers it was paying did not exist and that there were only about 19,000 soldiers in the army, as opposed to the 24,000 that had been previously believed. Government crackdowns against the practice are thought to have been a factor in a failed military mutiny in May 2004.

Renewed conflict, in which the Chadian military is involved, came in the form of a civil war against Sudanese-backed rebels. Chad successfully managed to repel many rebel movements, albeit with some losses (see Battle of N'Djamena (2008)). The army used its artillery systems and tanks, but well-equipped insurgents probably managed to destroy over 20 of Chad's 60 T-55 tanks, and probably shot down a Mi-24 Hind gunship, which bombed enemy positions near the border with Sudan. In November 2006 Libya supplied Chad with four Aermacchi SF.260W light attack planes. They were used to strike enemy positions by the Chadian Air Force, but one was shot down by rebels. During the 2008 battle of N'Djamena, gunships and tanks were put to good use, pushing armed militia forces back from the Presidential palace. The battle impacted the highest levels of the army leadership, as Daoud Soumain, its Chief of Staff, was killed.

On March 23, 2020, a Chadian army base was ambushed by fighters of the jihadist insurgent group Boko Haram. The army lost 92 servicemen in one day. In response, President Déby launched an operation dubbed "Wrath of Boma". According to Canadian counter terrorism St-Pierre, numerous external operations and rising insecurity in the neighboring countries had recently overstretched the capacities of the Chadian armed forces.

After the death of President Idriss Déby on 19 April 2021 in fighting with FACT rebels, his son General Mahamat Idriss Déby was named interim (and, later, permanent) president and head of the armed forces.

== Structure and organization ==
The Chadian General Staff of the Army Headquarters is located in N'Djamena.

The training institution of the Chadian National Army is the Groupement des écoles militaires interarmées du Tchad.

=== Budget ===
The CIA World Factbook estimates the military budget of Chad to be 4.2 percent of GDP as of 2006. Given the then GDP ($7.095 bln) of the country, military spending was estimated to be about $300 million. This estimate however dropped after the end of the Civil war in Chad (2005–2010) to 2.0% as estimated by the World Bank for the year 2011. Between 2020 and 2023, Chad's military budget consistently remained between 2.5 and 2.9 percent of GDP.

== External deployments ==
=== Current ===
Location	Dates	Details
Haiti	2026–present	GSF: Two battalions, 1,500 troops, to be deployed in 2026, of which 400 have been deployed.
Western Sahara	?–present	MINUSRO: One Chadian military observer as of 2024.

=== Former ===
Location	Dates	Details
Central African Republic	?–2014	MICOPAX and MISCA: As of 2010, there were 121 Chadian military personnel deployed in the Central African Republic for a peacekeeping mission in the framework of ECOWAS. Chad continued its involvement when the mission was replaced by the African Union-led MISCA, but it chose to withdraw after its soldiers were accused of shooting into a marketplace, unprovoked, in 2014.
Ivory Coast		UNOCI: One Chadian military observer as of 2010.
Mali	2013–2023	FATIM and MINUSMA: Chad has been the largest contributor of troops to the United Nations mission in Mali. Before that, from 2013 to 2014, Chad took part in Operation Serval alongside France. In the last year of the mission, 2023, there were 1,449 Chadian soldiers deployed. As of 2022 Chad had lost a total of 74 soldiers killed as part of the UN mission in Mali.
Nigeria	2015	MNJTF: Chad deployed 1,000 soldiers into Nigeria's Borno State in 2015 to attack Boko Haram.

== See also ==
- Chadian Armed Forces
- Chadian National Armed Forces
- Nomad and National Guard

== Sources ==
- Hansen, Ketil Fred (2023). "Chad: An Armed Intelligence Culture". In Shaffer, Ryan (ed.). The Handbook of African Intelligence Cultures. London: Rowman & Littlefield. ISBN 978-1-5381-5998-9.
- IISS (2024). The Military Balance 2024. London: Routledge. ISBN 978-1-032-78004-7.
- Tartter, Jean R. (1990). "National Security; Principal Armed Factions, 1975–1987". In Collelo, Thomas (ed.). Chad: A Country Study (2nd ed.). Washington, D.C.: Federal Research Division, Library of Congress. ISBN 0-16-024770-5.
