= Battle of Maaten al-Sarra =

Battle of the Toyota War

- Part of the Toyota War
Date	5 September 1987
Location	Maaten al-Sarra Air Base, Libya 21.6888548°N 21.828289°E
Result	Decisive Chadian victory

Belligerents
Chad; Support: United States	Libya

Commanders and leaders
(Chad) Hassan Djamous	(History of Libya under Muammar Gaddafi) Unknown

Strength
2,000	2,500; 70+ tanks 30+ APCs; 26–32 aircraft

Casualties and losses
65 killed 112 wounded	1,000–1,713 killed 300 captured 70 tanks destroyed 30 APCs destroyed 26–32 aircraft destroyed 8 radar stations destroyed 1 radar scrambling device destroyed
- Location of the Maaten al-Sarra Airbase within Libya, in relation to Chad.

The Battle of Maaten al-Sarra was fought between Chad and Libya on September 5, 1987, during the Toyota War. The battle took the form of a surprise Chadian raid against the Libyan Maaten al-Sarra Air Base, meant to remove the threat of Libyan airpower, that had already thwarted the Chadian attack on the Aouzou Strip in August. The first clash ever held in Libyan territory since the beginning of the Chadian–Libyan conflict, the attack was fully successful, causing a high number of Libyan casualties and low Chadian casualties, also contributing to the definitive ceasefire signed on September 11 among the warring countries.

== Background ==
In 1983, Libyan troops invaded Chad in support of the rebel Transitional Government of National Unity (GUNT). GUNT was fighting against the Chadian government led by Hissène Habré and French forces. French military interventions had limited the Libyan-GUNT advance to the 16th parallel (the so-called Red Line), freezing the situation on the ground until 1986, when the bulk of the GUNT forces turned against their Libyan patrons. Habré seized upon the opportunity to turn the tide against his enemy, and ordered his troops in December to attack Libyan positions in northern Chad. Starting in January 1987 with Fada and continuing with B'ir Kora and Ouadi Doum, the Chadian National Armed Forces' (FANT) commander-in-chief Hassan Djamous reported a series of key victories that forced Libyan forces to fall back on the Aouzou Strip.

Ignoring French pleas for restraint, Habré assumed a militant attitude towards the Libyan occupation of the Aouzou Strip; his troops successfully took Aouzou on August 8, but were repulsed on August 28, partly due to French refusal to provide air cover for Habré's attempt to regain Aouzou.

== Attack ==
Before the final Libyan assault, Habré had withdrawn Hassan Djamous and most of his veteran troops, planning to let them rest for a new offensive that would finally secure the Strip. Habré, judging by the decisive role played by close-range Libyan air strikes in the setback at Aouzou, concluded that Libya's greatest advantage was its ability to conduct endless air strikes. To remove this threat, Habré ordered Djamous to take 2,000 troops and destroy the main Libyan airbase in southern Libya, Maaten al-Sarra, 60 miles north of the Chadian-Libyan border. Habré may also have been encouraged in this raid by French President François Mitterrand's public declaration on September 3 that the Red Line was obsolete and thus French troops in Chad would no longer be bound by it.

Chad made military preparations for what seemed to be an attempt to retake Aouzou. Instead, encouraged by the United States, which supplied satellite intelligence, the FANT attacked Maaten al-Sarra on September 5, taking the Libyans by surprise, and apparently the French as well, who reacted by refusing to provide intelligence or logistic support. Djamous's troops were careful to follow the wadis, thus not exposing themselves, and they also took advantage of careless Libyan patrolling and security, intending to take the airbase's garrison and its defenders by surprise. To confuse the Libyans, the FANT forces first proceeded north and northwest in Libyan territory, then turned east and descended upon Maaten al-Sarra; as a result, the Libyan officers took them for reinforcements and attempted to join them.

Notwithstanding the defenders' 2,500-strong garrison, tank brigade, artillery, and extensive fortifications, the Chadian troops rapidly overcame the Libyan forces and assumed control of the base, starkly revealing the unpreparedness of the Libyan military. While the FANT's losses were minor, Libya suffered staggering casualties, with 1,713 Libyans killed, 300 taken prisoner and hundreds of others forced to flee into the surrounding desert. The Chadians then proceeded to demolish all the equipment they could not carry back, including 70 tanks, 30 APCs, 8 radar stations, a radar scrambling device, numerous SAMs, and 26 aircraft—including 3 MiG-23s, 1 Mi-24, and 4 Mirage F.1; they also tore up the base's two runways. Then, traveling without lights beneath the moon and stars, the FANT column withdrew to Chadian soil on September 6, and the Chadian government declared that the battle "must be written in gold letters in the great book of victories."

== Aftermath ==
Gaddafi's first reaction was to place the blame for the defeat on the French, challenging their position in Chad. A couple of days after Djamous' raid on Maaten two Tu-22 were dispatched, one to attack N'Djamena, the Chadian capital, and other to Abéché; the air raid was unsuccessful, as the Tupolev attacking the capital was shot down by a French Army Hawk SAM battery, while the second plane was forced to return to Libya without dropping its bombs. Libya's reaction to the downing was to publicly accuse the Maaten raid of being a "combined Franco-American military action", and added that France and the United States were "behind the aggression against Libya."

While the United States did not conceal its satisfaction for the Libyan defeat, a US official adding that "We basically jump for joy every time the Chadians ding the Libyans", France reacted differently, with the defence minister André Giraud expressing "deepest regrets" over the escalation. The French appeared to have judged the battle of Maaten al-Sarra even too successful for Habré, giving way to concerns that the battle was only the first stage of a general invasion of Libya, a thing that France wanted to avoid at all costs; therefore, on September 11, Mitterrand pressed Habré in agreeing to a ceasefire with Gaddafi, the Libyan leader accepting due to internal demoralization and foreign hostility. While the ceasefire was subject to many minor violations, it substantially held, thus putting an end to the Chadian-Libyan conflict.

However, the defeat also fostered in Gaddafi a simmering animosity against France and the United States, which led to Libyan support for the bombings of Pan Am Flight 103 from London to New York over Lockerbie, Scotland on December 21, 1988 and UTA Flight 772 from Chad to Paris over Niger on September 19, 1989.

== See also ==
- Battle of Aouzou
- 1985 krasnovodsk airbase raid
