= Battle of Aouzou =

Battle of the Toyota War

Coordinates: 21°48′56″N 17°25′46″E

- Part of the Toyota War
Date	8–28 August 1987 (2 weeks and 6 days)
Location	Aouzou, Chad
Result	Chadian victory (first battle); Libyan victory (second battle)

Belligerents
Chad	(History of Libya under Muammar Gaddafi) Libya

Commanders and leaders
(Chad) Mahamat Nouri	(History of Libya under Muammar Gaddafi) Gen. Ali ash-Sharif

Strength
Unknown (first battle); 400~ (second battle)	3,000 (first battle); 15,000 (second battle)

Casualties and losses
Unknown	1,225 killed 262 wounded 147 captured 30+ tanks & APCS destroyed 111 vehicles captured

The Battle of Aouzou refers to a pair of battles fought between Chad and Libya in and around the town of Aouzou (Chad) in August 1987, as part of the Toyota War, the last phase of the larger Chadian–Libyan conflict. The first battle resulted in a Chadian victory, while the second battle, a Libyan counteroffensive, is deemed to have been won by Libya.

== First Battle ==
In late 1987, the Chadian National Armed Forces (FANT) were in the process of retaking northern Chad from Libya. The battle for the Aouzou Strip — a strip of land in northern Chad then controlled by Libya — began in late July. After suffering a string of defeats, the Libyan Army organized a counteroffensive on 8 August in an attempt to regain a foothold in the nearby Tibesti Mountains. As the 3,000-strong Libyan force drove southwards, towards the Tibesti town of Bardaï, they were intercepted by the FANT, which surrounded and attacked them on multiple sides, forcing them to retreat. The Chadians then began aggressively pursuing the Libyans northwards through the desert, towards Aouzou, inflicting numerous casualties along the way to the Libyan Army, which suffered 650 killed, 147 captured, 111 military vehicles captured, and at least 30 tanks and APCs destroyed. With the Libyans routed, the FANT troops easily moved into the town of Aouzou that same day; however, this move went against the advice of France's president and Chadian ally François Mitterrand, who refused to provide air support for the operation.

== Second Battle ==
The loss of Aouzou infuriated Libya's leader, Muammar Gaddafi, who ordered its recapture. He sent Ali ash-Sharif, who was widely considered to be Libya's most capable general, along with 15,000 troops to retake the town. The Libyans began bombarding the town with artillery and airstrikes to soften up the Chadian positions. Despite the bombardment, when the Libyans finally attacked on 14 August they were repelled and lost over 200 men in the process. Ash-Sharif regrouped and launched a second attack, but was defeated once more. The Chadians overcame the Libyans' far superior weaponry, which included Soviet T-55 tanks, by utilizing innovative tactics. For example, the Chadians would mount French-supplied MILAN anti-tank missiles on Toyota pickup trucks and then race two of the trucks towards the tank from opposite directions. The tanks were unable to move their turrets fast enough to track them. Meanwhile, the "Libyans conducted simple, slow-moving frontal assaults, which were easily broken up by fast, enveloping Chadian counterattacks."

Following his second defeat, ash-Sharif began an even greater artillery and aerial bombardment of the town. In addition, he brought in a number of commando units and formations from the Jamahiriya Guard. Ash-Sharif employed these forces as shock troops and, with enormous firepower — the Chadians lacking French air support — he finally succeeded in retaking Aouzou on 28 August. He was aided by the fact that several key Chadian commanders had pulled out of the town in preparation for a surprise attack on a Libyan air base, leaving behind only about 400 FANT soldiers led by a novice commander. In celebration, Gaddafi flew foreign journalists to the region to highlight the victory.

== Aftermath ==
In response, Chad - under the leadership of Chadian President Hissène Habré - launched a surprise attack against the Libyan Maaten al-Sarra Air Base on 5 September, which resulted in a spectacular victory. Fighting between the two nations was suspended six days later on 11 September 1987, when both leaders accepted a ceasefire proposed by the Organisation of African Unity. Chadian efforts to regain the Aouzou Strip were halted, and thus the town of Aouzou remained under Libyan control, for the time being.

The Aouzou dispute was concluded for good on 3 February 1994, when the judges of the International Court of Justice by a majority of 16 to 1 decided that the Aouzou Strip belonged to Chad. Monitored by international observers, the withdrawal of Libyan troops from the Strip began on 15 April and was completed by 10 May. The formal and final transfer of the Aouzou Strip from Libya to Chad took place on 30 May, when the sides signed a joint declaration stating that the Libyan withdrawal had been effected.
