= Battle of B'ir Kora =

Battle in the Toyota War

B'ir Kora
- Part of Toyota War
Date	18–20 March 1987
Location	B'ir Kora, Chad
Result	Chadian victory

Belligerents
(History of Libya under Muammar Gaddafi) Libya	Chad

Commanders and leaders
(History of Libya under Muammar Gaddafi) Unknown	(Chad) Hassan Djamous

Strength
1,500	unknown

Casualties and losses
800 killed 86 tanks destroyed 13 tanks captured	few several trucks destroyed

The Battle of B'ir Kora was a military engagement during the Toyota War. Fought between the Libyan army and the Chadian FANT on the morning of 19 March 1987, the battle saw the Chadians encircle and destroy several Libyan units.

== History ==
=== Background ===
Following years of conflict between Libya and Chad over the Aouzou Strip, in 1983 the Libyan Army organized an expeditionary force to invade and occupy northern Chad, under the pretexts that the expedition would support pro-Libyan Chadian rebels. Once established in the north, the Libyans conducted operations in support of various insurgent groups fighting against the Chadian government of Hissène Habré. The Libyan forces in Chad possessed a significant material and air power advantage over the Chadian army, but by 1986 had lost the support of Chadian rebels they were supposedly supporting.

At the start of 1987, the Libyan Expeditionary forces continued to hold strategic positions in the Chadian Sahara. However, on 2 January of that year a pro-government Chadian army (FANT) engaged a Libyan force garrisoning the town of Fada at the Battle of Fada. The battle was a Chadian victory, and resulted in the Chadians pushing further into Libyan-controlled territory. The defeat at Fada provoked the Libyan military into launching a number of airstrikes in Central Chad, strikes which in turn spurred the French government (which supported the Chadian government) to bomb Libyan-held targets in Chad. The arrival of the French Air Force in Chad effectively nullified the Libyan Air Force's ability to conduct combat operations against FANT, granting the organization a window of opportunity to attack Libyan positions without fear of Libyan air power.

=== Battle ===
==== First engagement ====
In early March, Chadian commanders led by Hassan Djamous decided the Libyan Expeditionary Forces needed to be reduced in size before the Libyans could be driven from Chad altogether. To accomplish this, it was decided that the Chadian defenses around Fada would be intentionally weakened; it was hoped that this reduction would be detected and that the Libyans would launch a counterattack to retake the town. FANT forces also launched a number of hit-and-run attacks against Libyan positions in Ouadi Doum (alternatively spelled Wadi Doum), where the Libyans had established an airbase.

In mid March, the Libyan army organised a task force of 1,500 men and advanced against Fada. However, on the evening of 18 March the Libyans were surround by multiple FANT units near B'ir Kora. When the Chadian attack began at dawn on the 19th, the Libyans (who had arranged their tanks and other vehicles to form makeshift laagers) were unable to hold their camp's perimeter when faced with the highly mobile Chadians. To draw the Libyans out of their defensive positions, the Chadians launched a diversionary attack against one segment of the Libyan defenses, while also preparing a much larger attack aimed at the opposite side of the Libyan line. The diversion worked, and when the Libyans committed their reserves to meet the Chadian feint, the main Chadian force was able to penetrate the Libyan rear and cause havoc. The Libyan defenses soon collapsed, resulting in the destruction of the Libyan force.

==== Second engagement ====
As the initial Libyan task force was being destroyed by the FANT ambush, the encircled Libyans were able to request reinforcements from Ouadi Doum. These requests were granted by the Libyan commander at Ouadi Doum, who dispatched a second task force to relieve the embattled first. However, by the time the relief force was dispatched the first Libyan force had already been destroyed, and in the intervening time the Chadians had begun to plan a second ambush. Just as had happened with the first force, the Chadians attacked and overran the Libyan relief force 12 miles north of B'ir Kora on the 20 March.

==== Casualties ====
The engagements at B'ir Kora resulted in heavy casualties for the Libyan army; both the initial task force and subsequent relief force were nearly annihilated. In total, the Libyan army had lost 800 men killed, 86 tanks destroyed, and 13 tanks captured.

=== Aftermath ===
The Chadian victory at B'ir Kora paved the way for FANT and other pro-government forces to mount further attacks against the Libyan army's positions in Northern Chad. These conflicts—collectively known as the Toyota War—continued until September 1987, and resulted in the withdraw of Libyan soldiers from Northern Chad.
