= Battle of Fada =

Battle of the Toyota War

Coordinates: 17°11′N 21°35′E

- Part of Toyota War
Date	2 January 1987
Location	Fada, Chad
Result	Chadian victory

Belligerents
(History of Libya under Muammar Gaddafi) Libya (Chad) CDR	Chad

Commanders and leaders
(History of Libya under Muammar Gaddafi) Unknown	Hassan Djamous

Strength
1,200 Libyan soldiers 300–400 CDR militia	3,000 soldiers

Casualties and losses
784 killed 81 captured 92 tanks destroyed 33 armoured vehicles destroyed 13 tanks captured 18 armoured vehicles captured	18 killed 3 trucks destroyed

The Battle of Fada took place in northern Chad in 1987, and was a turning point of the Chadian–Libyan conflict.

== Prelude ==
At the beginning of 1986 the Libyans controlled all Chad north of the 16th parallel. However, when France intervened in the country in Operation Sparrowhawk and Goukouni Oueddei and his People's Armed Forces rebelled against his former supporter Muammar Gaddafi, Libya's president, the situation became critical for the Libyan army and promising for Chad's President Hissène Habré.

Certain that the French would protect Chad south of the 16th parallel, Habré started assembling his army, the Chadian National Armed Forces (FANT), at Kalaït, a logistic depot built by France exactly at the 16th parallel, and which it had stocked with munitions, weapons and fuel. France and the United States had equipped the FANT with a large number of Toyota pickups, and antitank and antiaircraft missile launchers, such as MILAN ATGWs. The FANT assault under the command of Hassan Djamous deployed almost 3,000 soldiers for the coming battle.

== Battle ==
This powerful force attacked Fada, the capital of the Ennedi and a Libyan stronghold, on 2 January 1987. Djamous took the 1,000 Libyan soldiers and the 300–400 members of the Democratic Revolutionary Council (CDR) militia by surprise. In a short but brutal engagement, the FANT almost annihilated the Libyan armoured brigade that defended Fada: 784 Libyans and CDR militiamen died, 92 T-55 tanks and 33 BMP-1 infantry fighting vehicles were destroyed, and 13 T-55s and 18 BMP-1s captured, together with 81 Libyan soldiers taken prisoner. Chadian losses were minimal: only 18 soldiers died and three Toyotas were destroyed.

This was one of the first major combat victories employing the tactic of using light trucks armed with machine guns or rockets, later known as "technicals." This tactic mirrored the actions of the raids conducted by the Long Range Desert Group of World War II, but on a slightly smaller scale theater, against slightly less numerous enemies, but with more modern weaponry and equipment.

Although the Chadian commander's tactical ability played an important role in the victory, the anti-tank missiles were decisive. When combined with the superior maneuverability of the Toyotas, they proved their efficacy against the Libyan tanks.

== Aftermath ==
On 3 and 4 January the Libyan Air Force sent several waves of bombers to Fada in an attempt to destroy the captured equipment and ammunition. Still, the airstrikes could not change the essential fact that Libya had suffered a major defeat that was to prove the beginning of the end of the Chadian-Libyan War.
