= Ma'tan as-Sarra =

Ma'tan as-Sarra معطن السارة
- Oasis
- Location within Libya
- Coordinates: 21°41′0″N 21°49′52″E
- Country: Libya

Ma'tan as-Sarra is an oasis in the Kufra District municipality in the southeast corner of Libya. It is located in the Libyan Desert, 322 kilometres (200 mi) southwest of Kufra. A marginal oasis, with few palms and substandard water, it allowed the creation in 1811 of the last trans-Saharan caravan route. However, it historically has been little visited by Toubou and Zaghawa nomads.

In 1934, Ma'tan as-Sarra was turned over as part of the Sarra Triangle to Fascist Italy by the Anglo-Egyptian Sudan, who considered the area worthless sand and a cheap appeasement to Benito Mussolini's attempts at an empire.

In 1972, Libyan leader Muammar Gaddafi felt that Jaafar Nimeiry of Sudan had betrayed the Arab cause by signing the 1972 Addis Ababa Agreement ending the first Sudanese civil war. He established a base at Ma'tan as-Sarra to stockpile weapons and as a staging area for Sudanese insurgents, who were trained at the bases in Joudaim and Ma'sar Ra's near Tripoli. In July 1976, one thousand followers of Sudanese opposition leader Sadiq al-Mahdi left the oasis and stormed Khartoum after crossing northern Darfur and Kordofan. Al-Mahdi's force was defeated only after a tank battalion struck into the city after three days of heavy fighting.

Libya also established Maaten al-Sarra Air Base, which was heavily used during the Chadian–Libyan conflict (1978–1987). The base was subject to a highly successful raid on September 5, 1987 by the Chadian army that contributed to the signing of the September 11 Chad-Libya ceasefire that brought an end to the war.
