= Land Cruiser War =

Land Cruiser War may refer to:

- War in Darfur, conflict in the Darfur region of Sudan, nicknamed the "Land Cruiser War" by Sudanese rebels
- Toyota War, 1986-87 war on the Chad–Libya border, named after the Toyota Hilux and Land Cruiser vehicles used in it
