= Operation Épervier =

1986-2014 French military presence in Chad

- Part of the Chadian–Libyan conflict
Date	13 February 1986 – 1 August 2014
Location	Chad
Result	Diplomatic Gains for France and Libya: Libyan invasion stalled to Aouzou strip; Auzou strip returned to Chad after a peace treaty in 1994

Operation Épervier was the French military presence in Chad from 1986 until 2014.

== Containing Libya ==
Operation Épervier began on the night of 13-14 February 1986, under the defence agreement between France and Chad, and was prepared during a meeting in N'Djamena between the Chadian President Hissène Habré and the French Defence Minister Paul Quilès. Its goal was to contain the Libyan invasion that had resulted in the loss of all Chadian territory north of the 16th parallel and was threatening the capital; a new offensive had been started on 10 February by Libyan leader Muammar Gaddafi in the belief that there would be no French reaction.

The French Air Force was the first to strike: on 16 February an air raid on Ouadi Doum badly damaged the Ouadi Doum airbase, a strategic air base in Chad from which Libyan planes could attack N'Djamena and hamper the deployment of troops. On 17 February 1986, in retaliation for the Ouadi Doum air raid, a LARAF Tupolev Tu-22B attacked the airport at N'Djamena. The bomber ran into technical problems on its return journey. U.S. reconnaissance planes based in Sudan monitored distress calls sent by the pilot of the Tu-22 that probably crashed before reaching its base at Aouzou (it may have been hit by twin-tubes that fired in N'Djamena airport). On 18 February, 200 French Commandos took possession of Camp Dubut, near N'Djamena, which had previously been France's headquarters during Operation Manta (1983–1984). The commandos secured the camp for the mission's air force. The air force arrived the night of the 18th and was composed of six Mirage F1, four Jaguar fighter-bombers, and a battery of low altitude (anti-aircraft) Crotale missiles. To defend the capital and the camp against high altitude air attacks a battery of French Army Air Defense MIM-23 Hawk missiles arrived on 3 March, and shortly afterwards a radar was stationed at Moussoro, defended by 150 French troops. This brought the total number of troops in the country to 900.

For months the troops remained largely inactive, and the air force limited itself to reconnaissance missions for the Chadian army, remaining careful not to cross the 16th parallel. But when in October the leader of the GUNT Goukouni Oueddei rebelled against Gaddafi, and vicious fighting erupted in the Tibesti between his People's Armed Forces militia (1,500 to 2,000 men) and the Libyan army, who had 8,000 men in Chad, the situation changed. Overwhelmed by superior forces, Goukouni's forces were in peril; this led France to plan a mission to help the Tibesti rebels. On the night of 16-17 September, two Transall transport aircraft parachuted 6,000 litres of gasoline, munitions, provisions and anti-tank and anti-aircraft missiles into the Tibesti. It was also reported by Le Monde that a small number of French soldiers had secretly entered the Tibesti to support Goukouni's men.

On 2 January 1987 Habré's troops invaded the capital of the Ennedi, Fada; the battle was a triumph for the Chadians, while 781 Libyans remained on the ground. A decisive role was played by French supplies, especially the anti-tank MILAN missiles. Gaddafi answered by violating the red line of the 16th parallel; Libyan planes bombed Arada, 110 km south of the line, and Oum-Chalouba, close to a new French base established at Kalaït, exactly on the 16th parallel, manned by 250 troops. France's reaction was to bomb again on 7 January the airbase of Ouadi Doum: the fourteen aircraft employed in the operation destroyed the Libyan radar station, but limited themselves to this.

In what appears to have been an escalation, Libyan forces raided the French-Chadian base of Kalaït on 11 January; it was the first direct attack on the French contingent, which suffered no losses. Additionally, Gaddafi prepared a vast offensive: he added 4,000–6,000 troops to the 8,000 men stationed in the Bourkou-Ennedi-Tibesti. In the meantime, the French also strengthened their forces; in February Operation Épervier reached 2,200 men and established two new bases at Biltine and Abéché (Camp Moll), in eastern Chad.

Habré concentrated most of his forces near Fada; and when on 18 March the Libyan offensive was at last started the result was a disaster for Gaddafi. 1,200 Libyans were killed and 500 taken prisoner, and Faya-Largeau, the main Libyan stronghold in Chad, was taken without fighting on 27 March. In this recapture of Northern Chad, France did not officially take part in the fighting; but it is believed that a special unit of the DGSE (Service Action) participated in the taking of Ouadi Doum. In May, when the French Defence Minister Alain Giraud visited the town of Faya-Largeau, the policy of respect of the 16th parallel by the French troops was declared no longer applicable.

Libyan expulsion from Chad did not end the Chadian–Libyan conflict: the dispute over who was the rightful possessor of the Aouzou strip remained open, and when Habré occupied Aouzou on 8 August, the French contingent was once again involved. On 25 August Gaddafi's forces bombed Faya-Largeau, where a French parachute regiment was stationed, but damage was minimal. Habré started new offensive, on 7 September a Tupolev Tu-22 was sent to bomb the capital, but the aircraft was destroyed by the French Army MIM-23 Hawk battery. A simultaneous Libyan attack on Abéché was more successful, if not very effective, owing to the inadequacy of the French Air Force SAM Crotale battery recently deployed. France decided not to react to these attacks, to prevent an escalation.

On 11 September the Chadian and Libyan governments accepted a ceasefire mediated by the OAU, which put an end to the conflict. While long negotiations between the two parties started, the French continued to fortify their positions in Chad, including completion of an air strip at Abéché in September. The French started assuming humanitarian tasks, such as mine-clearing in northern Chad; it was during one of these missions that Operation Épervier reported on its first loss on 14 January 1988.

The Chadian–Libyan conflict officially came to an end in October 1988, when Chad resumed formal diplomatic relations with Libya, in accordance with recommendations made by the OAU. As a result, the French contingent started decreasing in size. Cost was another reason for a decrease in France's military presences: in 1987 alone, Operation Épervier had cost France 1.7 billion French francs. In 1989 the number of men deployed to Chad had fallen to 1,000, and many minor bases had been dismantled.

== New president in Chad, 1990s ==
Habré was an indirect victim of the fall of the Berlin Wall. The diminished importance of Africa for French policy also brought France to become more critical of Habré's bad human rights record. Habré moved to free himself from French tutelage by seeking friendship with the United States. Relations between Paris and N'Djamena diminished, to the point that the French decided to remain neutral in the conflict that started in April 1989 between the President and his former general Idriss Déby. Déby promised not to attack the French base at Abéché, and in his march to the capital was followed by an officer of the DGSE, Paul Fontbonne.

Déby occupied the Chadian capital on 3 December 1990, with the French maintaining themselves neutral. The increasing pillaging in the city did cause the troops to react: they secured the city's key-points (the airport, the embassy, the power station) and evacuated its 1250 western civilians.

With Déby in power, while Franco-Chadian relations remained good, those with Libya deteriorated considerably. Gaddafi sent a request to Déby for the deportation to Libya of the Haftar force, composed of former Libyan troops that had deserted. However, a secret joint operation to bring the troops to Nigeria was orchestrated by the CIA and components of Operation Épervier. Despite this failure, Chadian–Libyan relations remained good, and the last issues among the two countries were resolved in 1994 by the International Court of Justice of The Hague, that gave the Aouzou Strip to Chad.

The operation's key roles since have been logistical support in the restructuring and reduction of the Chadian army, that was reduced from 40,000 to 25,000 men, and in making possible the presidential election of 1996. Actions like the former helped the French authorities justify their presence in the country: when Amnesty International questioned them in April 1996 on this continued presence, the official answer was that Opération Épervier was being used to assist the democratic process in Chad, and also as an internal and external deterrent.

In theory, Operation Épervier, originally created to contain Libyan expansionism, should have come to an end with the settlement of all issues among the two countries; but Chad came to be seen as the "French aircraft carrier of the desert", of key strategic importance as one of the five countries (the others were Djibouti, Ivory Coast, Senegal, Gabon) with a continuing French military presence in August 2002. In that period Operation Épervier could count on 951 men, deployed in the bases of Hadji Kossei near N'Djamena and that of Croci next to Abéché.

== New Sudanese threat, 2000s ==
The threat represented by Sudan and its proxies had already brought the French forces to increase their units to 1,200 troops based near N'Djamena to protect the Chadian President Idriss Déby's administration in the event of a large scale attack by the United Front for Democratic Change rebels or an invasion by their chief tactical and financial supporters, the Sudanese military. French involvement, which increased by 300 troops in April 2006, further complicates the Chadian–Sudanese conflict. Air support at this time consisted of six Mirage F1 fighters, three tactical transport planes, two Breguet reconnaissance planes and three Puma helicopters.

Before and after the Battle of N'Djamena, French airplanes participated in reconnaissance missions to determine the scope of Sudanese involvement. The French forces also played a small but important part in the battle of N'Djamena, where they provided logistical support to the government but without taking sides in the fighting. They also provided the Chadian army with intelligence on the enemy's movements, and fired warning shots near the rebel column.

In 2006, President Déby responded to increasing instability by threatening to expel the 200,000 Sudanese Fur refugees: "If after June we can't guarantee the security of our citizens and the refugees, then it is up to the international community to find another country to shelter these refugees".

On 1 August 2014, Operation Épervier was replaced by Operation Barkhane.
