= Toyota War =

Last phase of the Chadian–Libyan conflict

- Part of the Chadian–Libyan War and the Cold War
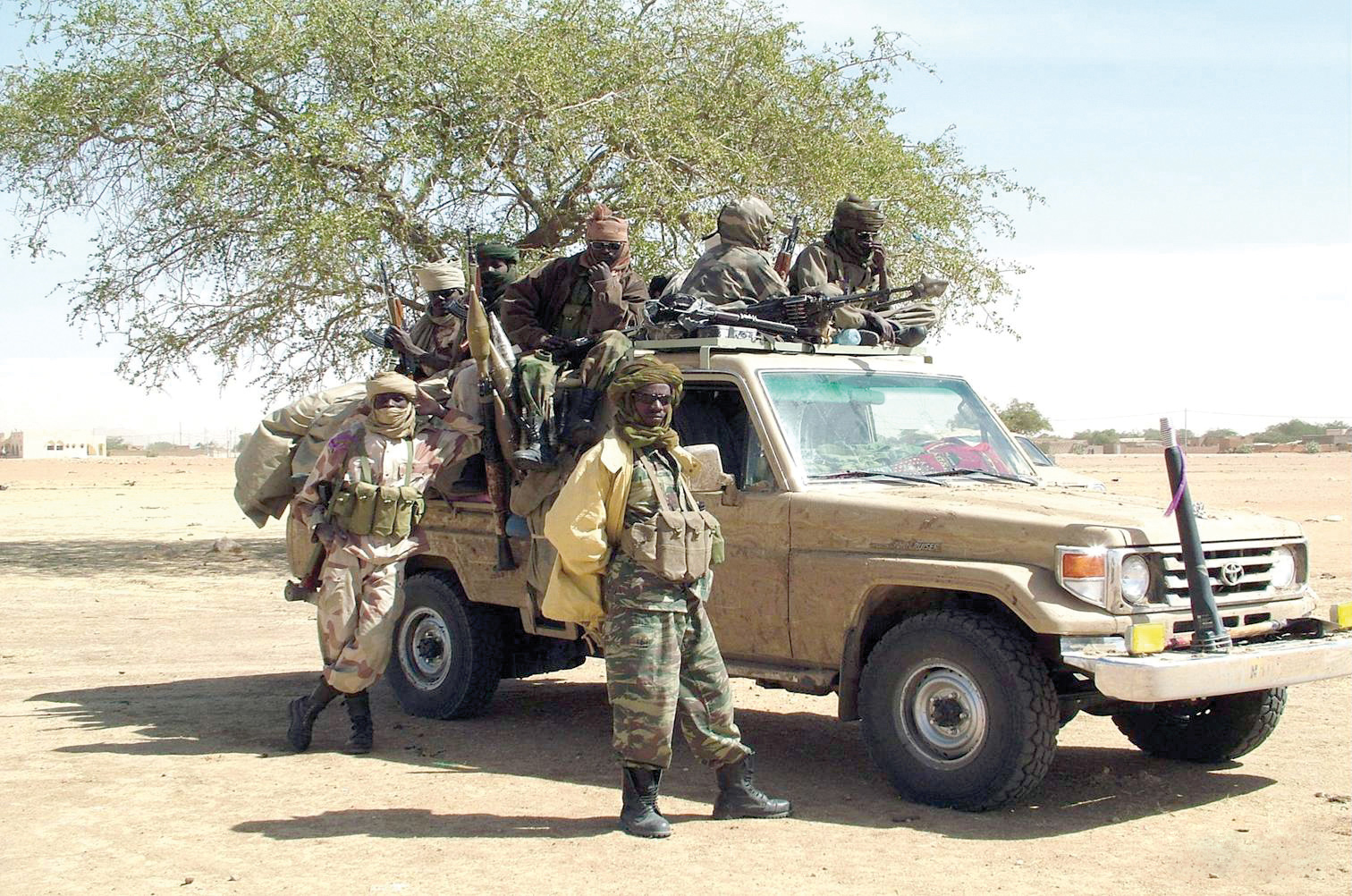
- Chadian soldiers on a Toyota Land Cruiser utility vehicle in 2008. Vehicles such as these gave the 1986–1987 conflict its name.
Date	16 December 1986 – 11 September 1987 (8 months, 3 weeks and 5 days)
Location	Borkou-Ennedi-Tibesti Prefecture, Chad
Result	Chadian and French victory: Ceasefire agreement; Expulsion of Libyan forces from Chad

Belligerents
Libya; CDR; PLO	FANT; FAP; France (Opération Épervier)

Commanders and leaders
Muammar Gaddafi; Khalifa Haftar (POW)	Hissène Habré; Hassan Djamous; Idriss Déby; François Mitterrand; Jean Saulnier

Strength
Libya: 90,000; 300+ tanks; 60+ aircraft; CDR: 1,000 militia	FANT: 28,000; FAP: 1,500–2,000; France: 1,500; 12+ aircraft

Casualties and losses
7,500 killed; 1,000 captured; 800 tanks and APCs lost; 28–32 aircraft destroyed	1,000 killed

The Toyota War (Arabic: حرب التويوتا, romanized: Ḥarb al-Tūyūtā, Harb-el-Touyouta, French: Guerre des Toyota), also known as the Great Toyota War, was the last phase of the Chadian–Libyan War which took place in 1987 in Northern Chad and on the Chad–Libya border. It takes its name from the Toyota pickup trucks, primarily the Toyota Hilux and the Toyota Land Cruiser, which were used to provide mobility for Chadian troops as they fought against the Libyans, and as technicals. The 1987 war resulted in a heavy defeat for Libya, which, according to American sources, lost one tenth of its army, with 7,500 men killed and US$1.5 billion worth of military equipment destroyed or captured. Chadian forces suffered 1,000 deaths.

The war began with the Libyan occupation of northern Chad in 1983, when Libya's leader Muammar Gaddafi, refusing to recognise the legitimacy of the Chadian President Hissène Habré, militarily supported the attempt by the opposition Transitional Government of National Unity (GUNT) to overthrow Habré. The plan was foiled by the intervention of France which, first with Operation Manta and later with Operation Epervier, limited Libyan expansion to north of the 16th parallel, in the most arid and sparsely inhabited part of Chad.

In 1986, the GUNT rebelled against Gaddafi, stripping Libya of its main cover of legitimacy for its military presence in Chad. Seeing an occasion to unify Chad behind him, Habré ordered his forces to pass the 16th parallel so as to link up with the GUNT rebels (who were fighting the Libyans in Tibesti) in December. A few weeks later a bigger force struck at Fada, destroying the local Libyan garrison. In three months, combining methods of guerrilla and conventional warfare in a common strategy, Habré was able to retake almost all of northern Chad, and in the following months, inflicted new heavy defeats on the Libyans, until a ceasefire putting an end to the conflict was signed in September. The ceasefire left open the issue of the disputed Aouzou Strip, which was eventually assigned to Chad by the International Court of Justice in 1994.

== Background ==
Since 1983, Chad was de facto partitioned, with the northern half controlled by the rebel Transitional Government of National Unity (GUNT) headed by Goukouni Oueddei and supported on the ground by Libyan forces, while the south was held by the Western-backed Chadian government guided by Hissène Habré. This partition on 16th parallel (the so-called Red Line) into Libyan and French zones of influence was informally recognised by France in 1984, following an accord between France and Libya to withdraw their forces from Chad. The accord was not respected by Libya, which maintained at least 3,000 men stationed in northern Chad.

During the period between 1984 and 1986, in which no major clash took place, Habré greatly strengthened his position thanks to Western support and Libya's failure to respect the Franco-Libyan 1984 agreement. From 1984 onwards, the GUNT also suffered increasing factional tensions, centered on the fight between Goukouni and Acheikh ibn Oumar over the leadership of the organisation. Taking advantage of the GUNT's difficulties, Habré struck a series of accords with smaller rebel factions, which left the GUNT at the beginning of 1986 with only three of the eleven factions that had originally signed the Lagos Accord in 1979. The remaining factions were Goukouni's People's Armed Forces (FAP), Acheikh's armed branch of the Democratic Revolutionary Council (CDR) and that part of the Chadian Armed Forces (FAT) which had maintained its loyalty to Wadel Abdelkader Kamougué.

== Forces on the ground ==
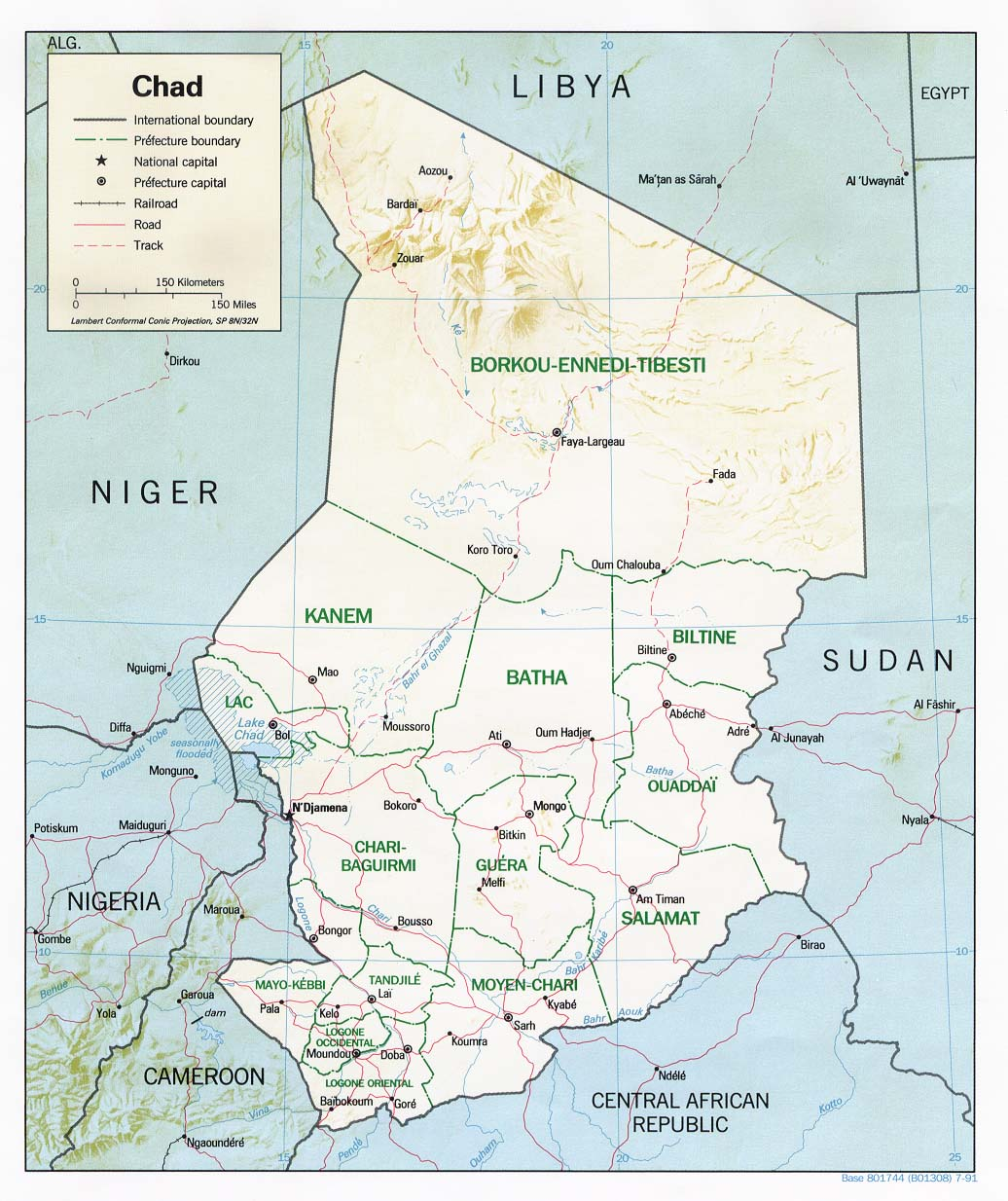
A map of Chad, with the Borkou-Ennedi-Tibesti Prefecture, where the war took place

At the opening of 1987, the last year of the war, the Libyan expeditionary force was still impressive, comprising 8,000 soldiers, 300 tanks, multiple rocket launchers (rocket artillery) and regular artillery pieces, Mi-24 helicopters, and sixty combat aircraft. These forces did not have a unified command but were divided into an Operational Group South, active in the Tibesti with 2,500 men, and an Operational Group East, centered in Faya-Largeau.

Though formidable, the Libyan military disposition in Chad was marred by serious flaws. The Libyans were prepared for a war in which they would provide ground and air support to their Chadian allies, who would then act as assault infantry, and provide reconnaissance. By 1987, however, Muammar Gaddafi had lost his allies, exposing Libya's inadequate knowledge of the area. Libyan garrisons came to resemble isolated and vulnerable islands in the Chadian Sahara. Also significant was the low morale among the troops, who were fighting in a foreign country, and the structural disorganization of the military of Libya, which was in part induced by Muammar Gaddafi's fear of a military coup against him. This fear led him to avoid the professionalization of the armed forces.

The Libyans also had to deal with the strengthened Chadian National Armed Forces (FANT), which was composed of 10,000 soldiers, led by experienced and able commanders, such as Idriss Déby, Hassan Djamous and Head of State Hissène Habré. And while FANT previously had no air power, limited mobility, and few anti-tank and anti-aircraft weapons, by 1987, it could count on the French Air Force to keep Libyan aircraft grounded and, most importantly, to provide 400 new Toyota pickups equipped with MILAN anti-tank guided missiles. It is these trucks that gave the name "Toyota War" to this last phase of the Chadian-Libyan conflict.

== Libyan expulsion ==
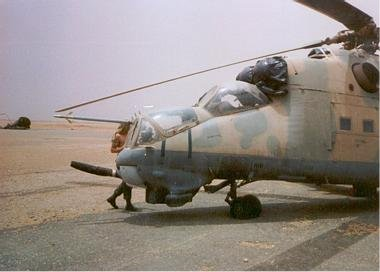
A Libyan Mil Mi-24 captured by Chadian forces at Ouadi Doum

Habré selected as the first target for his reconquest of northern Chad the well-fortified Libyan communications base of Fada. It was defended by 2,000 Libyans and the bulk of the Democratic Revolutionary Council (CDR) militia (Gaddafi's closest Chadian allies), well-provided with armour and artillery. Hassan Djamous, the thirty-year-old FANT commander-in-chief, pitched about 4,000–5,000 men against Fada's Libyan garrison. Taking advantage of his army's superior knowledge of the terrain, which apparently included unknown access points to the base, Djamous avoided a frontal assault and used his forces' high mobility to surround the Libyan positions and then unleashed his troops, destroying the defending garrison. In the battle, 784 Libyans were killed and 100 tanks destroyed, while 50 FANT soldiers died.

The unexpected defeat stunned Gaddafi, who then reacted on 4 January by recalling to service all of the army reservists. In an act of defiance towards France, he also ordered the bombing of Arada, well south of the 16th parallel. France retaliated with a new airstrike on Ouadi Doum and destroyed its radar system, effectively blinding the Libyan Air Force in Chad for several months. Gaddafi attempted to contain the FANT threat by rushing several new battalions into Chad (especially to Faya-Largeau and Ouadi Doum), including units of the elite Revolutionary Guard. This brought the amount of Libyan forces in the country to a total of 11,000 by March.

In March 1987, the main Libyan air base of Ouadi Doum was captured by Chadian forces. Although strongly defended by minefields, 5,000 soldiers, tanks, armoured vehicles, and aircraft, the Libyans' base fell to a smaller Chadian attacking force led by Djamous equipped with trucks mounted with machine guns and antitank weapons. Observers estimated that, in the Chadian victories in the first three months of 1987, more than 3,000 Libyan soldiers had been killed, captured, or deserted. Large numbers of tanks, armoured personnel carriers, artillery, fixed-wing aircraft, and helicopters were captured or destroyed. In some cases, Libya sent its own aircraft to bomb abandoned Libyan equipment to deny its use to the Chadians. It was reported that, in many cases, Libyan soldiers had been killed while fleeing to avoid battle. At Ouadi Doum, panicked Libyans had suffered high casualties running through their own minefields.

The fall of Ouadi Doum was a severe setback for Libya. Deserted by most of their Chadian allies, Libyan forces found themselves isolated in foreign territory, and the loss of the main Libyan air base in Chad prevented Libya from providing close air cover to its troops. In general, the offensive against FANT had exposed the vulnerability of Libya's heavy armour to a more mobile enemy. On Gaddafi's orders, a general withdrawal was undertaken from Borkou-Ennedi-Tibesti Prefecture, beginning with Faya-Largeau. The town had served as the main Libyan base during the preceding four years, but was in danger of being encircled. Its garrison of 3,000 men, together with the survivors of Ouadi Doum, retired toward the Libyan base at Maatan-as-Sarra, north of the Chadian border. In an attempt to reduce the damage inflicted to his international standing, Gaddafi announced that Libya had won the confrontation, and was now leaving Chad so that the opposition could play its part in fighting Habré.

These military actions left Habré in control of Chad and in a position to threaten the expulsion of Libya from the Aouzou Strip, affected the international perception of Libya as a significant regional military power, and cast renewed doubt on the competence and determination of Libyan soldiers, especially in engagements beyond the country's borders to which they evidently felt no personal commitment.

The Toyota War attracted considerable interest in the United States, where the possibility of using Habré to overthrow Gaddafi was given serious consideration. As part of the Reagan Administration's support for his government, Habré, during a visit to Washington, received a pledge of US$32 million worth of aid, including Stinger anti-aircraft missiles.

== Renewed Chadian offensive ==
The Aouzou Strip, highlighted in red

In August 1987, the encouraged Chadians carried their offensive into the disputed Aouzou Strip, occupying the town of Aouzou following another battle in which the Libyans suffered severe losses in troops and abandoned equipment. In retaliation, Libya intensified its air bombardments of towns in the north, usually from altitudes beyond the range of FANT's shoulder-fired missiles. Appeals by Habré for French air missions to defend the area against the bombing were rejected, as Aouzou had been retaken against the wishes of French President François Mitterrand. Instead, Mitterrand called for international mediation to settle competing claims to the disputed territory.

After a succession of counterattacks, toward the end of August, the Libyans finally drove the 400 Chadian soldiers out of the town. This victory – the first by Libyan ground forces since the start of the Toyota War – was apparently achieved through close-range air strikes, which were followed by ground troops advancing cross-country in jeeps, Toyota all-terrain trucks, and light armoured vehicles. For the Libyans, who had previously relied on ponderous tracked armour, the assault represented a conversion to the desert warfare tactics developed by FANT. To highlight the victory, Gaddafi flew foreign journalists to the region, so the news of his victory could reach the headlines.

Habré quickly reacted to this setback and to the continued bombing of FANT concentrations in northern Chad. On September 5, 1987, he mounted a surprise raid against the key Libyan air base at Maaten al-Sarra. Reportedly, 1,000 Libyans were killed, 300 were captured, and hundreds of others were forced to flee into the surrounding desert. Chad claimed that its troops destroyed about 32 aircraft – including Mikoyan-Gurevich MiG-21 and MiG-23 fighters, Sukhoi Su-22 fighter-bombers, and Mil Mi-24 helicopters – before the FANT column withdrew to Chadian soil.

The attack had been opposed by France, which refused to provide FANT with intelligence and logistical support, causing FANT to suffer considerable losses. The French Defence Minister André Giraud let it be known that "France was not implicated in any way" in the attack and "had not been informed of it". The American reaction was markedly different, as it had previously supported the attempted reconquest of the Aouzou Strip; it now welcomed the Chadian raid.

== Ceasefire ==
Because of domestic opposition, internal demoralisation, and international hostility, Gaddafi assumed a more conciliatory attitude following his defeat. On the other side, Habré also found himself vulnerable, as the French feared that the attack on Maatan as-Sarrah was only the first stage of a general offensive into Libya proper, a possibility that France was not disposed to tolerate. As a result, Mitterrand forced Habré to accept the mediation efforts of the Organisation of African Unity's Chairman, Kenneth Kaunda of Zambia, which resulted in a ceasefire on 11 September.

It was assumed that war would, sooner or later, resume, but in the end the ceasefire violations were relatively minor. Gaddafi announced in May 1988 that he would recognise Habré as President of Chad "as a gift to Africa", even if Libya refused to leave the disputed Aouzou Strip. On 3 October the two countries resumed diplomatic relations, and another important step was made when the two countries agreed in September 1990 to refer the dispute to the International Court of Justice. On 3 February 1994, the court ruled in favour of Chad, thus definitively solving the Aouzou controversy by assigning the territory to the southern country. Monitored by international observers, the withdrawal of Libyan troops from the Strip began on the 15 April and was completed by the 10 May. The formal and final transfer of the Aouzou Strip from Libya to Chad took place on the 30 May, when the sides signed a joint declaration stating that the Libyan withdrawal had been effected.

== See also ==
- Panhard AML – FANT's use of swift wheeled vehicles, including AML-90 models, allowed Chadian forces to break through combined arms formations and cause severe damage before the slower Libyan tanks (including T-55s) could track or engage their targets.
- Operation Mount Hope III - A top secret US military clandestine operation to capture a Soviet-made Mil Mi-25 "Hind-D" attack helicopter, an export model of the Soviet Mi-24 abandoned in the Chadian–Libyan War.

== Bibliography ==
- Azevedo, Mario Joaquim (1998). The Roots of Violence: A History of War in Chad. War and society. Amsterdam: Gordon & Breach. ISBN 978-90-5699-583-6.
- Brecher, Michael & Wilkenfeld, Jonathan (1997). A Study of Crisis. Ann Arbor, Michigan: University of Michigan Press. ISBN 978-0-472-10806-0.
- Clayton, Anthony (1999). Frontiersmen: Warfare in Africa Since 1950. Warfare and history. London; Philadelphia: UCL Press. ISBN 978-1-85728-525-3. OCLC 40658540.
- Collelo, Thomas (1990). Chad: A Country Study. US GPO. hdl:loc.gdc/scd0001.00199850076. ISBN 978-0-16-024770-5. LCCN 89600373.
- Metz, Helen Chapin, ed. (1989). Libya: A Country Study. US GPO. hdl:loc.gdc/scd0001.00205672060. ISBN 978-1-4191-3012-0. LCCN 88600480.
- Metz, Helen Chapin, ed. (2004). Libya. US GPO. ISBN 1-4191-3012-9.
- Ngansop, Guy Jérémie (1986). Tchad: Vingt Ans de Crise [Chad: Twenty Years of Crisis]. Racines du présent (in French). Paris: l'Harmattan. ISBN 978-2-85802-687-6.
- Neville, Leigh (2018). Technicals: Non-Standard Tactical Vehicles from the Toyota War to Modern Special Forces. New Vanguard Ser. London: Bloomsbury Publishing. ISBN 978-1-4728-2251-2.
- Nolutshungu, Sam C. (1996). Limits of Anarchy: Intervention and State Formation in Chad. Carter G. Woodson Institute series in Black studies. Charlottesville: University Press of Virginia. ISBN 978-0-8139-1628-6.
- Pollack, Kenneth M. (2002). Arabs at War: Military Effectiveness, 1948-1991. Studies in war, society, and the military. Lincoln, Neb.: University of Nebraska Press. ISBN 978-0-8032-3733-9.
- Simons, Geoffrey L. (2004). Libya and the West: From Independence to Lockerbie. Oxford: Bloomsbury Academic. ISBN 978-1-86064-988-2. OCLC 52829352.
- "La révolution Toyota en Libye: Le pick up des guérilleros". Fluctuat.net. 12 April 2011.
