= Fada Airport =

Airport in Chad

- IATA: none; ICAO: FTTF

Summary
- Airport type: Public
- Operator: Government
- Serves: Fada, Chad
- Elevation AMSL: 563 m / 1,847 ft
- Coordinates: 17°11′18″N 021°30′42″E

Map
- Location of airport in Chad

Runways
| Direction | Length | | Surface |
| Direction | m | ft | Surface |
|---|---|---|---|
| 12/30 | 1,800 | 5,906 | Laterite |
- Source: AIS ASECNA

Fada Airport (ICAO: FTTF) (Arabic: مطار فادا) is an airport serving Fada, located in the Ennedi-Ouest Region in Chad.

== Facilities ==
The airport is at an elevation of 563 metres (1,847 ft) above mean sea level. It has one runway designated 12/30 with a laterite surface measuring 1,800 by 30 metres (5,906 ft × 98 ft).
