= Maaten al-Sarra Air Base =

Maaten al-Sarra Air Base
- IATA: none; ICAO: none; LID: H56

Summary
- Airport type: Military
- Owner: Libyan National Army
- Operator: Libyan Air Force
- Elevation AMSL: 1,722 ft / 525 m
- Coordinates: 21°41′20″N 021°49′50″E

Map
- Location in Libya

Runways
| Direction | Length | | Surface |
| Direction | m | ft | Surface |
|---|---|---|---|
| 01R/19L | 2,283 | 7,490 | Asphalt |
| 01/19 | 3,357 | 11,014 | Asphalt |
- Source: Bing Maps Our Airports GCM

The Maaten al-Sarra Air Base is an airbase in southernmost Libya located near the Ma'tan as-Sarra oasis in the Kufra district. It is one of the 13 military airbases in Libya.

During the final phase of the Chadian-Libyan conflict, Maaten al-Sarra was the main air base in Southern Libya, having three modern runways and parking space for over 100 combat aircraft.

== History ==
When in 1987 the Chadian army attacked Libyan positions in northern Chad, in the Toyota War, after a string of victories the Chadians were defeated in August in the Battle of Aouzou, mainly due to Libyan airpower. The Chadian command decided that before renewing the offensive against the Aouzou Strip, it was vital to deal with the threat represented by the Libyan Air Force, and thus planned a surprise attack on Maaten al-Sarra, 60 miles north of the Chadian–Libyan border. The attack, which took place on September 5, was one of the most significant Chadian victories in the conflict, with 1,700 Libyans killed and 300 taken prisoner. The Chadian victory, because of Libyan demoralization at home and international hostility, brought an agreed ceasefire on September 11 that put an end to the war.

== Accidents and incidents ==
On 9 February 2026, a medical helicopter crashed at the base while returning from a medical evacuation mission, killing all five occupants on board.

== See also ==
- Transport in Libya
- List of airports in Libya
