= Chadian–Libyan War =

1978–1987 series of military campaigns

- Part of the Cold War and the Arab Cold War
- Respective locations of Chad (green) and Libya (orange)
Date	29 January 1978 – 11 September 1987 (9 years, 7 months, 1 week and 6 days)
Location	Chad
Result	Chadian and French victory
Territorial changes	Chad regains control of the Aouzou Strip.

Belligerents
Anti-Libyan Chadian factions: FAT (1978–1979); FAN (1978–1983); FANT (1983–1987); GUNT (1986–1987); France; Inter-African Force: Zaire; Nigeria; Senegal; NFSL	Libya: Islamic Legion; Pro-Libyan Chadian factions: FROLINAT; GUNT (1979–1986); Codos (1983–1986); FAP (1978–1986); Pro-Libyan Palestinian and Lebanese groups: PLO (1987); Abu Nidal Organization

Commanders and leaders
(Chad) Hissène Habré; (Chad) Hassan Djamous; (Chad) Idriss Déby; (France) V. Giscard d'Estaing; (France) François Mitterrand; Mohammed Magariaf; Khalifa Haftar (1987)	(Libya) Muammar Gaddafi; (Libya) Massoud Abdelhafid; (Libya) Khalifa Haftar (POW) (1986-1987); (Libya) Abdullah Senussi; (Libya) Ahmed Oun; (Libya) Abu-Bakr Yunis Jabr; (Libya) Abdel Fatah Younis; (Libya) Radwan Saleh Radwan; Goukouni Oueddei; (Palestine Liberation Organization) Mahmoud A. Marzouq

The Chadian–Libyan War was a series of military campaigns in Chad between 1978 and 1987, fought between Libya and its Chadian allies, and anti-Libyan Chadian groups supported by France, with the occasional involvement of other foreign countries and factions.

Libya had been involved in Chad's internal affairs prior to 1978 and before Muammar Gaddafi's rise to power in Libya in 1969, beginning with the extension of the Chadian Civil War to northern Chad in 1968. The conflict was marked by a series of four separate Libyan interventions in Chad, taking place in 1978, 1979, 1980–1981 and 1983–1987. On all of these occasions, Gaddafi had the support of a number of factions participating in the civil war, while Libya's opponents found the support of the French government, which intervened militarily to support the Chadian government in 1978, 1983 and 1986.

The pattern of the war delineated itself in 1978, with the Libyans providing armour, artillery and air support and their Chadian allies the infantry, which assumed the bulk of the scouting and fighting. This pattern was radically changed in 1986, towards the end of the war, when most Chadian forces united in opposing the Libyan occupation of northern Chad with a degree of unity never previously witnessed in Chad. This deprived the Libyan forces of their habitual infantry, exactly when they found themselves confronting a mobile army, well provided now by the United States, Zaire and France with anti-tank and anti-air missiles, thus cancelling out Libya's superiority in the air and in other respects. What followed was the Toyota War, in which the Libyan forces were routed and expelled from Chad, putting an end to the conflict.

Gaddafi initially intended to annex the Aouzou Strip, the northernmost part of Chad, which he claimed as part of Libya on the grounds of an unratified treaty of the colonial period. In 1972 his goals became, in the evaluation of historian Mario Azevedo, the creation of a client state in Libya's "underbelly", an Islamic republic modelled after his Jamahiriya, that would maintain close ties with Libya, and secure his control over the Aouzou Strip; expulsion of the French from the region; and use of Chad as a base to expand his influence in Central Africa.

== Background ==
=== Occupation of the Aouzou Strip ===
Libyan involvement with Chad can be said to have started in 1968, during the Chadian Civil War, when the insurgent Muslim National Liberation Front of Chad (FROLINAT) extended its guerrilla war against the Christian President François Tombalbaye to the northerly Borkou-Ennedi-Tibesti Prefecture (BET). Libya's king Idris I felt compelled to support the FROLINAT because of long-standing strong links between the two sides of the Chad–Libya border. To preserve relations with Chad's former colonial master and current protector, France, Idris limited himself to granting the rebels sanctuary in Libyan territory and to providing only non-lethal supplies.

All this changed with the Libyan coup d'état of 1 September 1969 that deposed Idris and brought Muammar Gaddafi to power. Gaddafi claimed the Aouzou Strip in northern Chad, referring to an unratified treaty signed in 1935 by Italy and France (then the colonial powers of Libya and Chad, respectively). Such claims had been previously made when in 1954 Idris had tried to occupy Aouzou, but his troops were repelled by the French Colonial Forces.

The Aouzou Strip, highlighted in red

Though initially wary of the FROLINAT, Gaddafi had come to see by 1970 the organization as useful to his needs. With the support of Soviet bloc nations, particularly East Germany, he trained and armed the insurgents, and provided them with weapons and funding. On 27 August 1971, Chad accused Egypt and Libya of backing a coup against then-president François Tombalbaye by recently amnestied Chadians.

On the day of the failed coup, Tombalbaye cut all diplomatic relations with Libya and Egypt, and invited all Libyan opposition groups to base themselves in Chad, and started laying claims to Fezzan on the grounds of "historical rights". Gaddafi's answer was to officially recognize on 17 September the FROLINAT as the sole legitimate government of Chad. In October, Chadian Foreign Minister Baba Hassan denounced Libya's "expansionist ideas" at the United Nations.

Through French pressure on Libya and the mediation of Nigerien President Hamani Diori, the two countries resumed diplomatic relations on 17 April 1972. Shortly after, Tombalbaye broke diplomatic relations with Israel and is said to have secretly agreed on 28 November to cede the Aouzou Strip to Libya. In exchange, Gaddafi pledged 40 million pounds to the Chadian President and the two countries signed a Treaty of Friendship in December 1972. Gaddafi withdrew official support to the FROLINAT and forced its leader Abba Siddick to move his headquarters from Tripoli to Algiers. Good relations were confirmed in the following years, with Gaddafi visiting the Chadian capital N'Djamena in March 1974; in the same month a joint bank was created to provide Chad with investment funds.

Six months after the signing of the 1972 treaty, Libyan troops moved into the Strip and established an airbase just north of Aouzou, protected by surface-to-air missiles. A civil administration was set up, attached to Kufra, and Libyan citizenship was extended to the few thousand inhabitants of the area. From that moment, Libyan maps represented the area as part of Libya.

The exact terms by which Libya gained Aouzou remain partly obscure and are debated. The existence of a secret agreement between Tombalbaye and Gaddafi was revealed only in 1988 when the Libyan leader exhibited an alleged copy of a letter in which Tombalbaye recognizes Libyan claims. Against this, scholars like Bernard Lanne have argued that there never was any sort of formal agreement and that Tombalbaye had found it expedient not to mention the occupation of a part of his country. Libya was unable to exhibit the original copy of the agreement when the case of the Aouzou Strip was brought before the International Court of Justice (ICJ) in 1993.

=== Expansion of the insurgency ===
The rapprochement was not to last long, as on 13 April 1975 a coup d'état removed Tombalbaye and replaced him with General Félix Malloum. As the coup was partly motivated by opposition to Tombalbaye's appeasement of Libya, Gaddafi considered it a menace to his influence and resumed supplying the FROLINAT. In April 1976, there was a Gaddafi-backed attempted assassination of Malloum, and in the same year, Libyan troops started making forays into central Chad in the company of FROLINAT forces.

Libyan activism began generating concerns in the strongest faction into which the FROLINAT had split, the Command Council of the Armed Forces of the North (CCFAN). The insurgents split on the issue of Libyan support in October 1976, with a minority leaving the militia and forming the Armed Forces of the North (FAN), led by the anti-Libyan Hissène Habré. The majority, willing to accept an alliance with Gaddafi, was commanded by Goukouni Oueddei. The latter group soon renamed itself People's Armed Forces (FAP).

In those years, Gaddafi's support had been mostly moral, with only a limited supply of weapons. All this started changing in February 1977, when the Libyans provided Oueddei's men with hundreds of AK-47 assault rifles, dozens of RPGs, 81 and 82mm mortars and recoilless cannons. Armed with these weapons, the FAP attacked in June the Chadian Armed Forces' (FAT) strongholds of Bardaï and Zouar in Tibesti and of Ounianga Kébir in Borkou. Oueddei took full control of the Tibesti with this attack after Bardaï, besieged since 22 June, surrendered on 4 July 1977, while Zouar was evacuated. The FAT lost 300 men, and piles of military supplies fell into the hands of the rebels. Ounianga was attacked on 20 June, but was saved by the French military advisors present there.

As it had become evident that the Aouzou Strip was being used by Libya as a base for deeper involvement in Chad, Malloum decided to bring the issue of the Strip's occupation before the UN and the Organisation of African Unity. Malloum also decided he needed new allies; he negotiated a formal alliance with Habré, the Khartoum Accord, in September. This accord was kept secret until 22 January 1978, when a Fundamental Charter was signed, following which a National Union Government was formed on 29 August 1978 with Habré as Prime Minister. The Malloum-Habré accord was actively promoted by Sudan and Saudi Arabia, both of which feared a radical Chad controlled by Gaddafi. The two nations saw in Habré, with his good Muslim and anti-colonialist credentials, the only chance to thwart Gaddafi's plans.

== Conflict ==
=== Libyan escalation ===
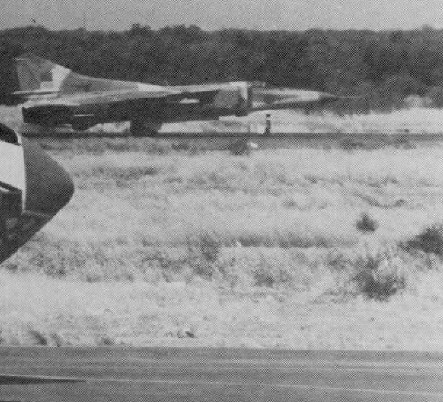
MiG-23MS with empty missile rails rolling along the runway at Faya Largeau Airbase, some time in the mid-1980s

The Malloum-Habré accord was perceived by Gaddafi as a serious threat to his influence in Chad, and he increased the level of Libyan involvement. For the first time with the active participation of Libyan ground units, Goukouni's FAP unleashed the Ibrahim Abatcha offensive on 29 January 1978 against the last outposts held by the government in northern Chad: Faya-Largeau, Fada and Ounianga Kébir. The attacks were successful, and Oueddei and the Libyans assumed control of the BET Prefecture.

The decisive confrontation between the Libyan-FAP forces and the Chadian regular forces took place at Faya-Largeau, the capital of the BET. The city, defended by 5,000 Chadian soldiers, fell on 18 February 1978 after sharp fighting to a force of 2,500 rebels, supported by possibly as many as 4,000 Libyan troops. The Libyans do not seem to have directly participated in the fighting; in a pattern that was to repeat itself in the future, the Libyans provided armor, artillery and air support. The rebels also were much better armed than before, displaying Strela-2 surface-to-air missiles.

Goukouni Oueddei's forces captured about 2,500 prisoners in 1977 and 1978; as a result, the Chadian Armed Forces lost at least 20% of their manpower. In particular, the National and Nomadic Guard (GNN) was decimated by the fall of Fada and Faya. Oueddei used these victories to strengthen his position in the FROLINAT: during a Libyan-sponsored congress held in March in Faya-Largeau, the insurgency's main factions reunited themselves and nominated Goukouni Oueddei as the secretary-general.

Malloum's reaction to the Goukouni–Gaddafi offensive was to sever diplomatic relations with Libya on 6 February 1978 and bring before the UN Security Council the issue of Libyan involvement. He raised again the question of Libya's occupation of the Aouzou Strip; on 19 February, however, after the fall of Faya-Largeau, Malloum was forced to accept a ceasefire and withdraw the protest. Gaddafi halted the advance of Oueddei because of pressure from France, then an important supplier of Libya's weapons.

Malloum and Gaddafi restored diplomatic relations on 24 February 1978 in Sabha, Libya, where an international peace conference was held which included as mediators Niger's president, Seyni Kountché, and Sudan's vice-president, Abu al-Gasim Mohamed Ibrahim. Under severe pressure from France, Sudan and Zaire, Malloum was forced to sign the Benghazi Accord, which recognized the FROLINAT and agreed on a new ceasefire, on 27 March. The agreement called for the creation of a joint Libya–Niger military committee tasked with implementation; through this committee, Chad legitimized Libyan intervention in its territory. The accord also contained a condition dear to Libya: the termination of all French military presence in Chad. The stillborn accord was for Gaddafi nothing more than a strategy to strengthen his protégé Oueddei; it also weakened considerably Malloum's prestige among southern Chadians, who saw his concessions as a proof of his weak leadership.

On 15 April 1978, only a few days after signing the ceasefire, Oueddei left Faya-Largeau, leaving there a Libyan garrison of 800 men. Relying on Libyan armor and air power, Goukouni's forces conquered a small FAT garrison and turned towards N'Djamena.

Against Goukouni Oueddei stood freshly arrived French forces. Already in 1977, after Oueddei's first offensives, Malloum had asked for a French military return in Chad, but President Valéry Giscard d'Estaing was at first reluctant to commit himself before the 1978 legislative elections; also, France was afraid of damaging its profitable commercial and diplomatic relations with Libya. However, the rapid deterioration of the situation in Chad resolved the President on 20 February 1978 to start Opération Tacaud, which by April brought 2,500 troops to Chad to secure the capital from the rebels.

The decisive battle took place at Ati, a town 430 kilometres northeast of N'Djamena. The town's garrison of 1,500 soldiers was attacked on 19 May 1978 by the FROLINAT insurgents, equipped with artillery and modern weapons. The garrison was relieved by the arrival of a Chadian task force supported by armor and, more importantly, of the French Foreign Legion and the 3rd Regiment of Marine Infantry. In a two-day battle, the FROLINAT was repelled with heavy losses, a victory that was confirmed in June by another engagement at Djedaa. The FROLINAT admitted defeat and fled north, having lost 2,000 men and left the "ultramodern equipment" they carried on the ground. Of key importance in these battles was the complete air superiority the French could count on, as the Libyan Air Force pilots refused to fight them.

=== Libyan difficulties ===
Only a few months after the failed offensive against the capital, major dissensions in the FROLINAT shattered all vestiges of unity and badly weakened Libyan power in Chad. On the night of 27 August, Ahmat Acyl, leader of the Volcan Army, attacked Faya-Largeau with the support of Libyan troops in what was an attempt by Gaddafi to remove Goukouni from the leadership of the FROLINAT, replacing him with Acyl. The attempt backfired, as Goukouni reacted by expelling all Libyan military advisors present in Chad, and started searching for a compromise with France.

The reasons for the clash between Gaddafi and Goukouni were both ethnic and political. The FROLINAT was divided between Arabs, like Acyl, and Toubous, like Goukouni and Habré. These ethnic divisions also reflected a different attitude towards Gaddafi and his Green Book. In particular, Goukouni and his men had shown themselves reluctant to follow Gaddafi's solicitations to make The Green Book the official policy of the FROLINAT, and had first tried to take time, postponing the question until the complete reunification of the movement. When the unification was accomplished, and Gaddafi pressed again for the adoption of The Green Book, the dissensions in the Revolution's Council became manifest, with many proclaiming their loyalty to the movement's original platform approved in 1966 when Ibrahim Abatcha was made first secretary-general, while others, including Acyl, fully embraced the Colonel's ideas.

In N'Djamena, the simultaneous presence of two armies—Prime Minister Habré's FAN and President Malloum's FAT—set the stage for the battle of N'Djamena, which was to bring about the collapse of the State and the ascent to power of the Northern elite. A minor incident escalated on 12 February 1979 into heavy fighting between Habré and Malloum's forces, and the battle intensified on 19 February when Goukouni's men entered the capital to fight alongside Habré.

By 16 March 1979, when the first international peace conference took place, an estimated 2,000–5,000 people had been killed and 60,000–70,000 forced to flee. The greatly diminished Chadian army left the capital in the rebels' hands and reorganized itself in the south under the leadership of Wadel Abdelkader Kamougué. During the battle, the French garrison stood passively by, even helping Habré in certain circumstances, as when they demanded that the Chadian Air Force stop its bombings.

An international peace conference was held in Kano in Nigeria, in which Chad's bordering states participated along with Malloum, Habré, and Goukouni. The Kano Accord was signed on 16 March by all those present, and Malloum resigned, replaced by a Council of State under the chairmanship of Goukouni. This was a result of Nigerian and French pressures on Goukouni and Habré to share power; the French in particular saw this as part of their strategy to cut all ties between Goukouni and Gaddafi. A few weeks later, the same factions formed the Transitional Government of National Unity (GUNT), kept together to a considerable extent by the common desire to see Libya out of Chad.

Despite signing the Kano Accord, Libya was incensed that the GUNT did not include any of the leaders of the Volcan Army and had not recognized Libyan claims on the Aouzou Strip. Since 13 April 1979 there had been some minor Libyan military activity in northern Chad, and support was provided to the secessionist movement in the south. However, a major response came only after 25 June, when the ultimatum of Chad's neighbors for the formation of a new, more inclusive coalition government expired. On 26 June, 2,500 Libyan troops invaded Chad, heading for Faya-Largeau. The Chadian government appealed for French help. The Libyan forces were first stymied by Goukouni's militiamen and then forced to retreat by French reconnaissance planes and bombers. In the same month, the factions excluded by the GUNT founded a counter-government, the Front for Joint Provisional Action (FACP), in northern Chad with Libyan military support.

The fighting with Libya, the imposition by Nigeria of an economic boycott, and international pressure led to a new international peace conference in Lagos in August, in which all eleven factions present in Chad participated. A new accord was signed on 21 August, under which a new GUNT was to be formed, open to all factions. The French troops were to leave Chad and be replaced by a multinational African peace force. The new GUNT took office in November, with Goukouni President, Kamougué vice-president, Habré Defence Minister and Acyl Foreign Minister. Despite the presence of Habré, the new composition of the GUNT had enough pro-Libyans to satisfy Gaddafi.

=== Libyan intervention ===
From the start, Habré isolated himself from the other members of the GUNT, which he treated with disdain. Habré's hostility to Libya's influence in Chad united itself with his ambition and ruthlessness: observers concluded that the warlord would never be content with anything short of the highest office. It was thought that sooner or later an armed confrontation between Habré and the pro-Libyan factions would take place, and more importantly, between Habré and Goukouni.

Clashes in the capital between Habré's FAN and pro-Libyan groups became progressively more serious. On 22 March 1980, a minor incident, as in 1979, triggered the Second Battle of N'Djamena. In ten days, the clashes between the FAN and Goukouni's FAP, which both had 1,000–1,500 troops in the city, caused thousands of casualties and the flight of about half the capital's population. The few remaining French troops, who left on 4 May, proclaimed themselves neutral, as did the Zairean peace force.

While the FAN was supplied economically and militarily by Sudan and Egypt, Goukouni received the armed support of Kamougué's FAT and Acyl's CDR shortly after the beginning of the battle and was provided with Libyan artillery. On 6 June 1980, the FAN assumed control of the city of Faya. This alarmed Goukouni, and he signed, on 15 June, a Treaty of Friendship with Libya. The treaty gave Libya a free hand in Chad, legitimising its presence in that country; the treaty's first article committed the two countries to mutual defence, and a threat against one constituted a threat against the other.

Beginning in October, Libyan troops, led by Khalifa Haftar and Ahmed Oun, airlifted to the Aouzou Strip operated in conjunction with Goukouni's forces to reoccupy Faya. The city was then used as an assembly point for tanks, artillery and armored vehicles that moved south against the capital of N'Djamena.

An attack started on 6 December 1980, spearheaded by Soviet T-54 and T-55 tanks and reportedly coordinated by advisors from the Soviet Union and East Germany, bringing the fall of the capital on 16 December. The Libyan force, numbering between 7,000 and 9,000 men of regular units and the paramilitary Pan-African Islamic Legion, 60 tanks, and other armored vehicles, had been ferried across 1,100 kilometers of the desert from Libya's southern border, partly by airlift and tank transporters and partly under its own power. The border itself was 1,000 to 1,100 kilometers from Libya's main bases on the Mediterranean coast. Wright states that the Libyan intervention demonstrated an impressive logistical ability, and provided Gaddafi with his first military victory and substantial political achievement.

While forced into exile and with his forces confined to the frontier zones of Darfur, Habré remained defiant. On 31 December 1980 he announced in Dakar he would resume fighting as a guerrilla against the GUNT.

=== Libyan withdrawal ===
On 6 January 1981, a joint communiqué was issued in Tripoli by Gaddafi and Goukouni that Libya and Chad had decided "to work to achieve full unity between the two countries". The merger plan caused a strong adverse reaction in Africa, and was immediately condemned by France, which on 11 January offered to strengthen its garrisons in friendly African states and on 15 January placed its Mediterranean fleet on alert. Libya answered by threatening to impose an oil embargo, while France threatened to react if Libya attacked another bordering country. The accord was also opposed by all GUNT ministers present with Goukouni at Tripoli, with the exception of Acyl.

Most observers believe that the reasons behind Goukouni's accepting the accord may be found in a mix of threats, intense pressure and the financial help promised by Gaddafi. Just before he visited the Libyan capital, Goukouni had sent two of his commanders to Libya for consultations; at Tripoli, Goukouni learned from Gaddafi that they had been assassinated by "Libyan dissidents", and that if Goukouni did not want to risk losing Libyan favour and lose power, he should accept the merger plan.

The level of opposition caused Gaddafi and Goukouni to downplay the importance of the communiqué, speaking of a "union" of peoples, and not of states, and as a "first step" towards closer collaboration. But the damage had been done, and the joint communiqué badly weakened Goukouni's prestige as a nationalist and a statesman.

In response to the increasing international pressure, Goukouni stated that Libyan forces were in Chad at the government request and that international mediators should accept the decision of Chad's legitimate government. In a meeting held in May, Goukouni became more accommodating, declaring that while Libyan withdrawal was not a priority, he would accept the decisions of the OAU. Goukouni could not at the time renounce Libyan military support, necessary for dealing with Habré's FAN, which was supported by Egypt and Sudan and funded through Egypt by the US Central Intelligence Agency.

Relations between Goukouni and Gaddafi started deteriorating. Libyan troops were stationed in various points of northern and central Chad, in numbers that had reached about 14,000 troops by January and February 1981. These forces created considerable annoyance in the GUNT by supporting Acyl's faction in its disputes with the other militias, including the clashes held in late April with Goukouni's FAP. There were also attempts to Libyanize the local population, which made many conclude that "unification" for Libya meant Arabization and the imposition of Libyan political culture, in particular of The Green Book.

Amid fighting in October between Gaddafi's Islamic Legionnaires and Goukouni's troops, and rumors that Acyl was planning a coup d'état to assume the leadership of the GUNT, Goukouni demanded on 29 October 1981 the complete and unequivocal withdrawal of Libyan forces from Chadian territory, which, beginning with the capital, was to be completed by 31 December. The Libyans were to be replaced by an OAU Inter-African Force (IAF). Gaddafi complied, and by 16 November all Libyan forces had left Chad, redeploying in the Aouzou Strip.

Libya's prompt retreat took many observers by surprise. One reason lay in Gaddafi's desire to host the OAU's annual conference in 1982 and assume the organization's presidency. Another was Libya's difficult situation in Chad where, without some popular and international acceptance of Libyan presence, it would have been difficult to take the concrete risk of causing a war with Egypt and Sudan, with U.S. support. Gaddafi had not renounced the goals he had set for Chad, but he had to find a new Chadian leader, as Goukouni had proved himself unreliable.

=== Habré takes N'Djamena ===
The first IAF component to arrive in Chad were the Zairean paratroopers; they were followed by Nigerian and Senegalese forces, bringing the IAF to 3,275 men. Before the peace-keeping force was fully deployed, Habré had already taken advantage of Libya's withdrawal and made massive inroads in eastern Chad, including the important city of Abéché, which fell on 19 November. Next to fall was Oum Hadjer in early January 1982, only 160 kilometres (99 mi) from Ati, the last major town before the capital. The GUNT was saved for the moment by the IAF, the only credible military force confronting Habré, which prevented the FAN from taking Ati.

In the light of Habré's offensive, the OAU requested that the GUNT open reconciliation talks with Habré, a demand that was angrily refused by Goukouni; later he was to say:

The OAU has deceived us. Our security was fully ensured by Libyan troops. The OAU put pressure on us to expel the Libyans. Now that they have gone, the organization has abandoned us while imposing on us a negotiated settlement with Hissein Habre.

In May 1982, the FAN started a final offensive, passing unhindered by the peacekeepers in Ati and Mongo. Goukouni, increasingly angered with the IAF's refusal to fight Habré, made an attempt to restore his relations with Libya and reached Tripoli on 23 May. Gaddafi, however, burned by his experience the previous year, proclaimed Libya neutral in the civil war.

The GUNT forces made a last stand at Massaguet, 80 kilometres (50 mi) north of the capital, but were defeated by the FAN on 5 June 1982 after a hard battle. Two days later Habré entered N'Djamena unopposed, making him the de facto leader of Chad, while Goukouni fled the country, seeking sanctuary in Cameroon.

After occupying the capital, Habré consolidated power by occupying the rest of the country. In barely six weeks, he conquered southern Chad, destroying the FAT, Kamougué's militia; Kamougué's hopes for Libyan help failed to materialize. The rest of the country was conquered, with the exception of the Tibesti.

=== GUNT offensive ===
Since Gaddafi had kept mostly aloof in the months before the fall of N'Djamena, Habré hoped to reach an understanding with Libya, possibly through an accord with Acyl, who appeared receptive to dialogue. But Acyl died on 19 July 1982, replaced by Acheikh ibn Oumar, and the CDR was antagonized by Habré's eagerness to unify the country, which led him to overrun the CDR's domains.

Therefore, it was with Libyan support that Goukouni reassembled the GUNT, creating in October a National Peace Government in the Tibesti town of Bardaï and claiming itself the legitimate government by the terms of the Lagos Accord. For the impending fight, Goukouni could count on 3,000–4,000 men taken from several militias, later merged in an Armée Nationale de Libération (ANL) under the command of a Southerner, Negue Djogo.

Before Gaddafi could throw his full weight behind Goukouni, Habré attacked the GUNT in the Tibesti, but was repelled both in December 1982 and in January 1983. The following months saw the clashes intensify in the North, while talks, including visits in March between Tripoli and N'Djamena, broke down. On 17 March, Habré brought the conflict before the UN, asking for an urgent meeting of the UN Security Council to consider Libya's "aggression and occupation" of Chadian territory.

Gaddafi was ready now for an offensive. The decisive offensive began in June, when a 3,000-strong GUNT force invaded Faya-Largeau, the main government stronghold in the North, which fell on 25 June 1983. The GUNT force rapidly proceeded towards Koro Toro, Oum Chalouba, and Abéché, assuming control of the main routes towards N'Djamena. Libya, while helping with recruiting, training, and providing the GUNT with heavy artillery, only committed a few thousand regular troops to the offensive, and most of these were artillery and logistic units. This may have been due to Gaddafi's desire that the conflict be read as a Chadian internal affair.

The international community, in particular France and the U.S., reacted adversely to the Libyan-backed offensive. On the same day as the fall of Faya, French Foreign Minister Claude Cheysson warned Libya that France would "not remain indifferent" to a new Libyan involvement in Chad, and on 11 July 1983 the French government accused again Libya of direct military support to the rebels. French arms shipments were resumed on 27 June, and on 3 July a first contingent of 250 Zaireans arrived to strengthen Habré; the United States announced in July military and food aid for 10 million dollars. Gaddafi suffered also a diplomatic setback from the OAU, that at the meeting held in June officially recognized Habré's government and asked for all foreign troops to leave Chad.

Supplied by Americans, Zaireans and the French, Habré rapidly reorganized his forces (now called Chadian National Armed Forces, or FANT). FANT marched north to confront the GUNT and the Libyans, who he met south of Abéché. Habré crushed Goukouni's forces and started a vast counteroffensive that enabled him to retake in rapid succession Abéché, Biltine, Fada and, on 30 July, Faya-Largeau, threatening to attack the Tibesti and the Aouzou Strip.

=== French intervention ===
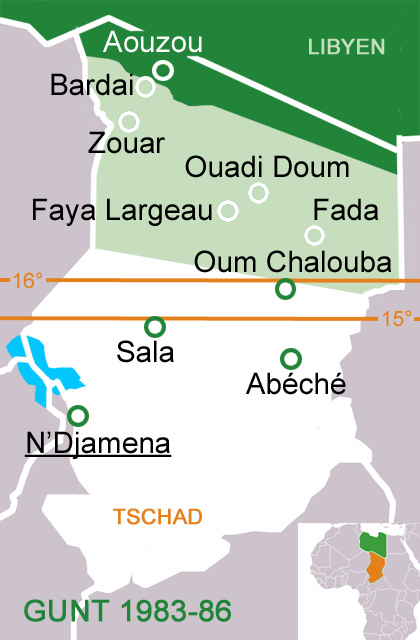
GUNT-controlled area in Chad until 1986/87 (light green), "red line" on the 15th and 16th parallels (1983 and 1984) and Libyan-occupied Aouzou Strip (dark green)

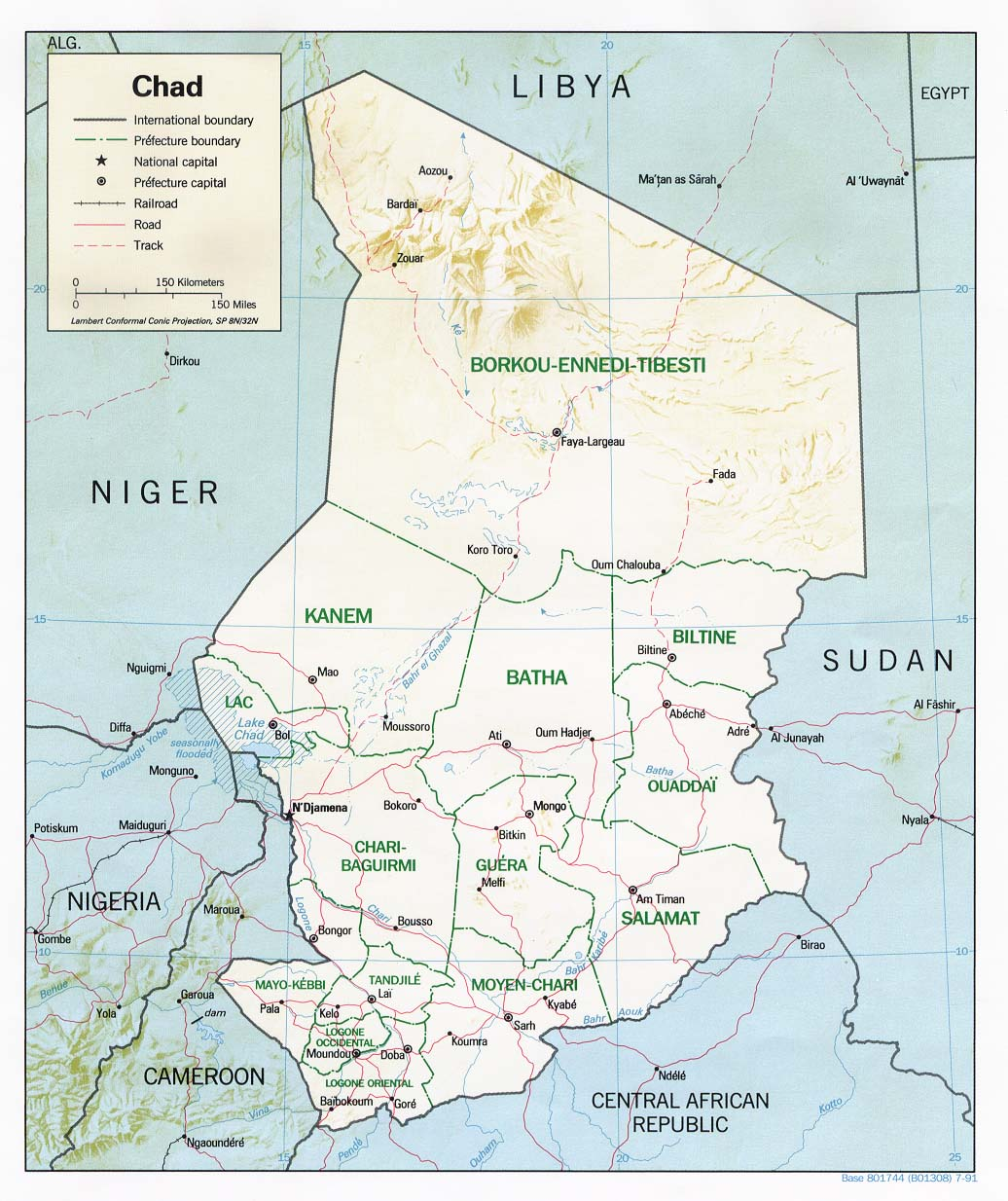
A map of Chad including the 15th parallel (the Red Line) where the French separated government and rebel forces

Feeling that complete destruction of the GUNT would be an intolerable blow to his prestige, and fearing that Habré would provide support for all opposition to Gaddafi, the Colonel called for a Libyan intervention in force, as his Chadian allies could not secure a definitive victory without Libyan armor and airpower.

Since the day after the fall of the town, Faya-Largeau was subjected to a sustained air bombardment, using Su-22 and Mirage F-1s from the Aouzou air base, along with Tu-22 bombers from Sabha. Within ten days, a large ground force had been assembled east and west of Faya-Largeau by first ferrying men, armor, and artillery by air to Sabha, Kufra and the Aouzou airfield, and then by shorter-range transport planes to the area of conflict. The fresh Libyan forces amounted to 11,000 mostly regular troops, and eighty combat aircraft participated in the offensive; however, the Libyans maintained their traditional role of providing fire support, and occasional tank charges, for the assaults of the GUNT, which could count on 3,000–4,000 men on this occasion.

The GUNT-Libyan alliance invested on 10 August in the Faya-Largeau oasis, where Habré had entrenched himself with about 5,000 troops. Battered by multiple rocket launcher (MRL), artillery and tank fire and continuous airstrikes, the FANT's defensive line disintegrated when the GUNT launched the final assault, leaving 700 FANT troops on the ground. Habré escaped with the remnants of his army to the capital, without being pursued by the Libyans.

This was to prove a tactical blunder, as the new Libyan intervention had alarmed France. Habré issued a fresh plea for French military assistance on 6 August. France, also due to American and African pressures, announced on 6 August the return of French troops in Chad as part of Operation Manta, meant to stop the GUNT-Libyan advance and more generally weaken Gaddafi's influence in the internal affairs of Chad. Three days later several hundred French troops were dispatched to N'Djamena from the Central African Republic, later brought to 2,700, with several squadrons of Jaguar fighter-bombers. This made it the largest expeditionary force ever assembled by the French in Africa outside of the Algerian War.

The French government then defined a limit (the so-called Red Line), along the 15th parallel, extending from Mao to Abéché, and warned that they would not tolerate any incursion south of this line by Libyan or GUNT forces. Both the Libyans and the French remained on their side of the line, with France showing itself unwilling to help Habré retake the north, while the Libyans avoided starting a conflict with France by attacking the line. This led to a de facto division of the country, with Libya maintaining control of all the territory north of the Red Line.

A lull ensued, during which November talks sponsored by the OAU failed to conciliate the opposing Chadian factions. Ethiopian leader Mengistu's attempt at the beginning of 1984 was also unsuccessful. Mengistu's failure was followed on 24 January 1984 by a GUNT attack, supported by heavy Libyan armor, on the FANT outpost of Ziguey, a move mainly meant to persuade France and the African states to reopen negotiations. France reacted to this breach of the Red Line by launching the first significant air counter-attack, bringing new troops into Chad and unilaterally raising the defensive line to the 16th parallel.

=== French withdrawal ===
To put an end to the deadlock, Gaddafi proposed on 30 April 1984 a mutual withdrawal of both the French and Libyan forces in Chad. French President François Mitterrand showed himself receptive to the offer, and on 17 September the two leaders publicly announced that the mutual withdrawal would start on 25 September, and be completed by 10 November. The accord was at first hailed by the media as proof of Mitterrand's diplomatic skill and decisive progress towards the solution of the Chadian crisis; it also demonstrated Mitterrand's intent of following a foreign policy independent from both the US and the Chadian government regarding Libya and Chad.

While France respected the deadline, the Libyans limited themselves to retiring some forces, while maintaining at least 3,000 men stationed in Northern Chad. When this became evident, it embarrassed the French and caused recriminations between the French and Chadian governments. On 16 November, Mitterrand met with Gaddafi on Crete, under the auspices of the Greek prime minister Papandreou. Despite Gaddafi's declaration that all Libyan forces had been withdrawn, the next day Mitterrand admitted that this was not true. However, he did not order French troops back to Chad.

According to Nolutshungu, the 1984 bilateral Franco-Libyan agreement may have provided Gaddafi with an excellent opportunity to find an exit from the Chadian quagmire while bolstering his international prestige and allowed him to force Habré into accepting a peace accord which would have included Libya's proxies. Instead, Gaddafi misread France's withdrawal as a willingness to accept Libya's military presence in Chad and the de facto annexation of the whole BET Prefecture by Libya, an action that was certain to meet the opposition of all Chadian factions and of the OAU and UN. Gaddafi's blunder would eventually bring about his defeat, with the rebellion against him of the GUNT and a new French expedition in 1986.

=== New French intervention ===
During the period between 1984 and 1986, in which no major clash took place, Habré greatly strengthened his position thanks to staunch US support and Libya's failure to respect the Franco-Libyan 1984 agreement. Also decisive was the increasing factional bickering that started plaguing the GUNT since 1984, centered around the fight between Goukouni and Acheikh ibn Oumar over the organization's leadership.

In this period, Gaddafi expanded his control over northern Chad, building new roads and erecting a major new airbase, Ouadi Doum, meant to better support air and ground operations beyond the Aouzou Strip. He also brought in considerable reinforcements in 1985, raising Libyan forces in the country to 7,000 troops, 300 tanks and 60 combat aircraft. While this build-up took place, significant elements of the GUNT passed over to the Habré government, as part of the latter's policy of accommodation.

These desertions alarmed Gaddafi, as the GUNT provided a cover of legitimacy to Libya's presence in Chad. To put a halt to these and reunite the GUNT, a major offensive was launched on the Red Line to take N'Djamena. The attack, which started on 10 February 1986, involved 5,000 Libyan and 5,000 GUNT troops, and concentrated on the FANT outposts of Kouba Olanga, Kalait and Oum Chalouba. The campaign ended in disaster for Gaddafi, when a FANT counteroffensive on 13 February using the new equipment obtained from the French forced the attackers to withdraw and reorganize.

Most important was the French reaction to the attack. Gaddafi had possibly believed that, due to the upcoming French legislative elections, Mitterrand would be reluctant to start a new risky and costly expedition to save Habré; this evaluation proved wrong, as what the French President could not politically risk was to show weakness towards Libyan aggression. As a result, on 14 February 1986 Opération Epervier was started, bringing 1,200 French troops and several squadrons of Jaguars to Chad. On 16 February, to send a clear message to Gaddafi, the French Air Force bombed Libya's Ouadi Doum airbase. Libya retaliated the next day when a Libyan Tu-22 bombed the N'Djamena Airport, causing minimal damage.

=== Tibesti War ===
The defeats suffered in February and March accelerated the disintegration of the GUNT. When in March, at a new round of OAU-sponsored talks held in the People's Republic of Congo, Goukouni failed to appear, many suspected the hand of Libya. These suspicions caused the defection from the GUNT of its vice president, Kamougué, followed by the First Army and the piecemeal FROLINAT Original. In August, it was the CDR's turn to leave the coalition, seizing the town of Fada. When in October Goukouni's FAP attempted to retake Fada, the Libyan garrison attacked Goukouni's troops, giving way to a pitched battle that effectively ended the GUNT. In the same month, Goukouni was arrested by the Libyans, while his troops rebelled against Gaddafi, dislodging the Libyans from all their positions in the Tibesti, and on 24 October went over to Habré.

To reestablish their supply lines and retake the towns of Bardaï, Zouar and Wour, the Libyans sent a task force of 2,000 troops with T-62 tanks and heavy support by the Libyan Air Force into the Tibesti. The offensive started successfully, expelling the GUNT from its key strongholds, also through the use of napalm. This attack ultimately backfired, causing the prompt reaction of Habré, who sent 2,000 FANT soldiers to link with the GUNT forces. Also, Mitterrand reacted forcefully, ordering a mission which parachuted fuel, food, ammunition and anti-tank missiles to the rebels, and also infiltrated military personnel. Through this action, the French made clear that they no longer felt committed to keeping south of the Red Line, and were ready to act whenever they found it necessary.

While militarily Habré was only partly successful in his attempt to evict the Libyans from the Tibesti (the Libyans would fully leave the region in March, when a series of defeats in the north-east had made the area untenable), the campaign was a great strategic breakthrough for the FANT, as it transformed a civil war into a national war against a foreign invader, stimulating a sense of national unity that had never been seen before in Chad.

=== Toyota War ===
At the opening of 1987, the last year of the war, the Libyan expeditionary force was still impressive, numbering 8,000 troops and 300 tanks. However, it had lost the key support of its Chadian allies, who had generally provided reconnaissance and acted as assault infantry. Without them the Libyan garrisons resembled isolated and vulnerable islands in the Chadian desert. To reinforce his troops, Gaddafi enlisted the aid of various Palestinian and Lebanese armed factions with whom he was allied. Several of these such as the Abu Nidal Organization sent militants to bolster the Libyan numbers in Chad. On the other side, the FANT was greatly strengthened, now having 10,000 highly motivated troops, provided with fast-moving and sand-adapted Toyota trucks equipped with MILAN anti-tank missiles. These trucks gave the name "Toyota War" to the last phase of the conflict.

Habré started, on 2 January 1987, his reconquest of northern Chad with a successful attack on the well-defended Libyan communications base of Fada. Against the Libyan army, the Chadian commander Hassan Djamous conducted a series of swift pincer movements, enveloping the Libyan positions and crushing them with sudden attacks from all sides. This strategy was repeated by Djamous in March in the battles of B'ir Kora and Ouadi Doum, inflicting crushing losses and forcing Gaddafi to evacuate northern Chad.

This in turn endangered Libyan control over the Aouzou Strip, and Aouzou fell in August to the FANT, only to be repelled by an overwhelming Libyan counter-offensive and the French refusal to provide air cover to the Chadians. Habré readily replied to this setback with the first Chadian incursion in Libyan territory of the Chadian–Libyan conflict, mounting on 5 September a surprise and fully successful raid against the key Libyan air base at Maaten al-Sarra. This attack was part of a plan to remove the threat of Libyan airpower before a renewed offensive on Aouzou. Given the French intervention on behalf of Chad and U.S. supply of satellite intelligence to FANT during the Maaten al-Sarra battle, Gaddafi blamed Libya's defeat on French and U.S. "aggression against Libya".

The projected attack on Aouzou never took place, as the dimensions of the victory obtained at Maaten made France fear that the attack on the Libyan base was only the first stage of a general offensive into Libya proper, a possibility that France was not willing to tolerate. As for Gaddafi, being subjected to internal and international pressures, he showed himself more conciliatory, which led to an OAU-brokered ceasefire on 11 September.

== Aftermath ==
While there were many violations of the ceasefire, the incidents were relatively minor. The two governments immediately started complex diplomatic manoeuvres to bring world opinion on their side in case, as was widely expected, the conflict was resumed. However, the two sides were also careful to leave the door open for a peaceful solution. The latter course was promoted by France and most African states, while the Reagan Administration saw a resumption of the conflict as the best chance to unseat Gaddafi.

Steadily, relations between the two countries improved, with Gaddafi giving signs that he wanted to normalize relations with the Chadian government, to the point of recognizing that the war had been an error. In May 1988, the Libyan leader declared he would recognize Habré as the legitimate president of Chad "as a gift to Africa" which led on 3 October 1988 to the resumption of full diplomatic relations between the two countries. The following year, on 31 August 1989, Chadian and Libyan representatives met in Algiers to negotiate the Framework Agreement on the Peaceful Settlement of the Territorial Dispute, by which Gaddafi agreed to discuss with Habré the Aouzou Strip and to bring the issue to the ICJ for a binding ruling if bilateral talks failed. After a year of inconclusive talks, the sides submitted the dispute to the ICJ in September 1990.

Chadian-Libyan relations further improved when Libyan-supported Idriss Déby unseated Habré on 2 December 1989. Gaddafi was the first head of state to recognize the new government, and he also signed treaties of friendship and cooperation on various levels. Regarding the Aouzou Strip, however, Déby followed his predecessor, declaring that if necessary he would fight to keep the strip out of Libya's hands.

The Aouzou dispute was concluded for good on 3 February 1994, when the judges of the ICJ by a majority of 16 to 1 decided that the Aouzou Strip belonged to Chad. The court's judgement was implemented without delay, the two parties signing an agreement as early as 4 April concerning the practical modalities for the implementation of the judgement. Monitored by international observers, the withdrawal of Libyan troops from the Strip began on 15 April and was completed by 10 May. The formal and final transfer of the Strip from Libya to Chad took place on 30 May, when the sides signed a joint declaration stating that the Libyan withdrawal had been effected.

== See also ==
- Operation Mount Hope III
