= Aouzou, Chad =

Aouzou Aozou
- Town
- Location in Chad
- Coordinates: 21°48′58″N 17°25′50″E
- Country: Chad
- Region: Tibesti
- Elevation: 913 m (2,996 ft)
- Time zone: UTC+01:00 (WAT)

Aouzou (/ˈaʊzuː/; Arabic: أوزو, alternatively Aozou) is a small town and oasis in the extreme north of Chad, situated within the Aouzou Strip. It was the site of the Battle of Aouzou, during which Chadian forces captured the town from Libya in August 1987, followed by its recapture by Libya less than a month later. The town was formally transferred to Chadian control in 1994, along with the entirety of the Aouzou Strip.

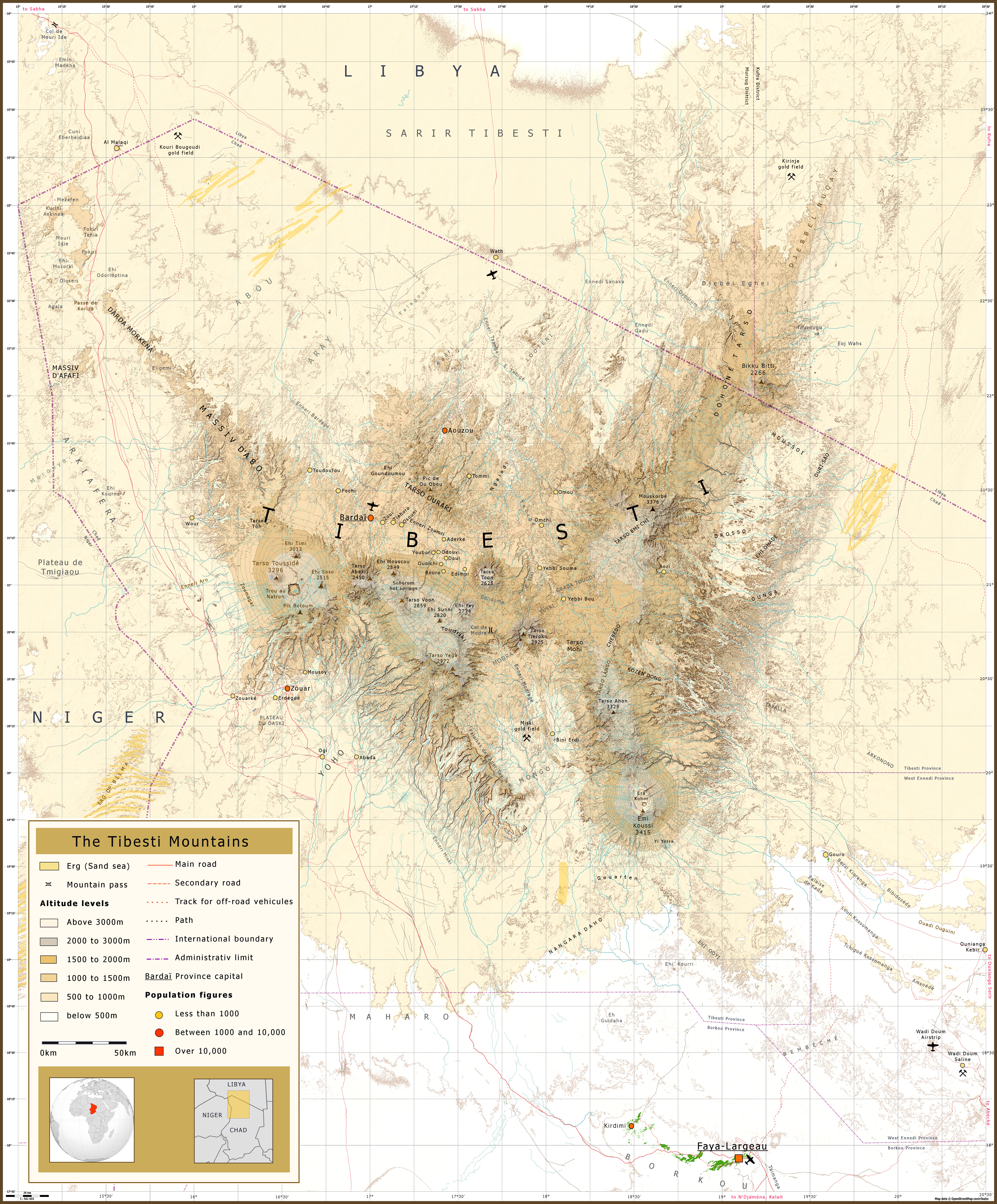
Map of the Tibesti mountains with Aouzou located on the northern edge of the mountain range.

In the early 1980s, the total population of the Aouzou area and the nearby valley of the Enneri Yebige was estimated to number around 1,300 people.
