= MILAN =

Franco-German anti-tank missile

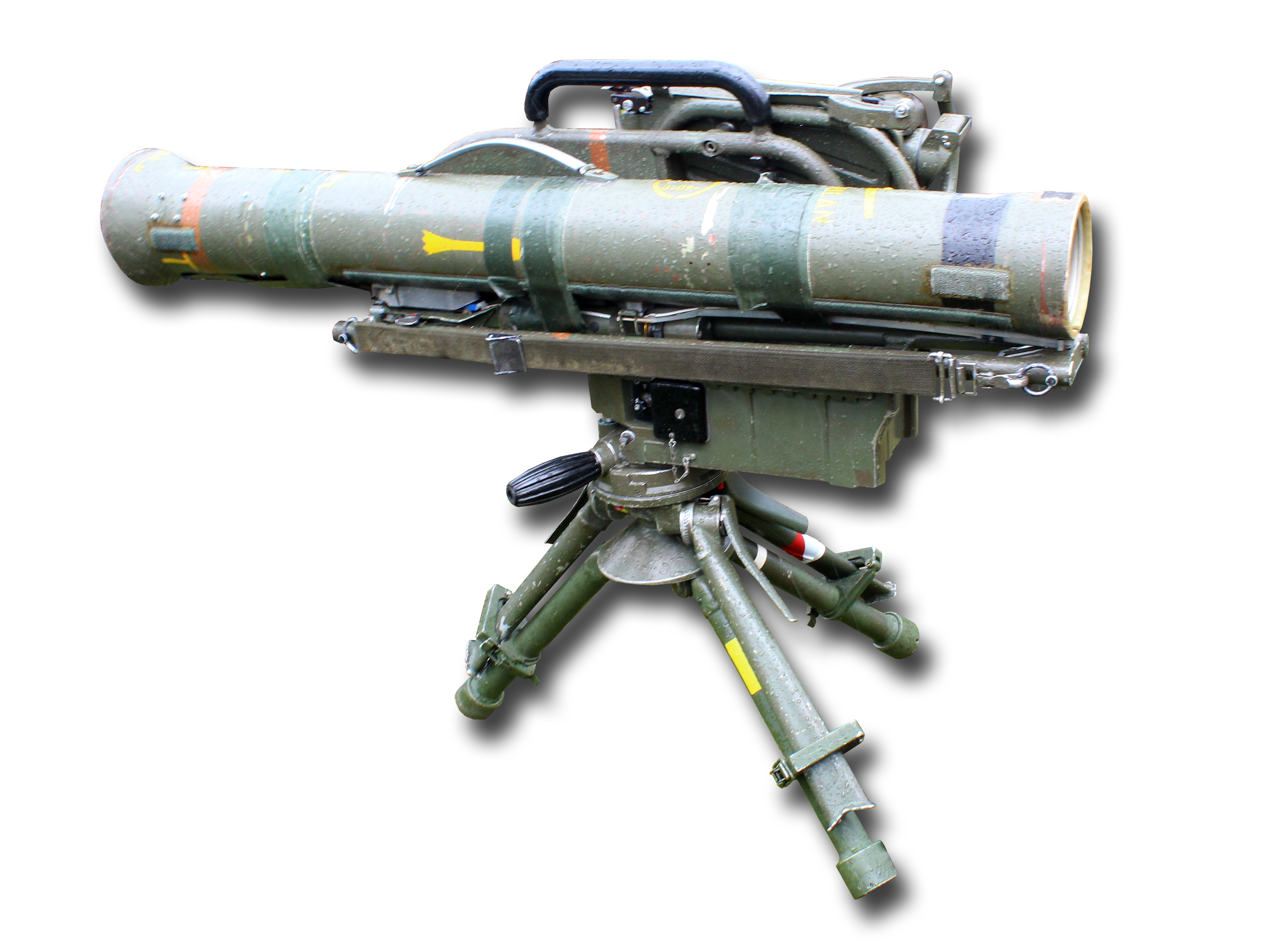
- MILAN missile launcher with tripod
- Type: Anti-tank missile
- Place of origin: France, West Germany

Service history
- In service: 1972–present
- Used by: See operators
- Wars: South African Border War; Chadian-Libyan conflict; Toyota War; Western Sahara War; Lebanese Civil War; Iran–Iraq War; Falklands War; Gulf War; 2003 invasion of Iraq; Iraq War; Opération Licorne; Libyan Civil War; Northern Mali Conflict; Operation Sangaris; War in Iraq (2013–2017); Syrian Civil War; Russian invasion of Ukraine

Production history
- Designed: 1970s
- Manufacturer: MBDA; Also produced under license by: Bharat Dynamics (India); BAe Dynamics (United Kingdom)
- Unit cost: £7,500 (1984)
- Produced: 1971
- No. built: 350,000 missiles, 10,000 launchers
- Variants: See variants

Specifications (MILAN 3)
- Mass: 16.4 kg
- Length: 1.2 m (3 ft 11 in)
- Diameter: 115 mm (4.5 in)
- Wingspan: 260 mm (10 in)
- Warhead: Single or tandem HEAT
- Detonation mechanism: contact
- Engine: solid-fuel rocket
- Operational range: 200–2,000 m (660–6,560 ft); 3,000 m (MILAN ER)
- Maximum speed: 200 m/s (660 ft/s)
- Guidance system: SACLOS wire
- Steering system: Jet deflector
- Launch platform: Individual, vehicle

MILAN (French: Missile d'Infanterie Léger Antichar, lit. 'Lightweight Infantry Anti-tank Missile') is a Franco-West German anti-tank guided missile system. Design of the MILAN began in 1962; it was ready for trials in 1971, and accepted for service in 1972. It is a wire-guided semi-automatic command to line of sight (SACLOS) missile, which means the sight of the launch unit must be aimed at a target to guide the missile. The MILAN can be equipped with a MIRA or MILIS thermal sight to give it night-firing ability.

"Milan" is also a common name in French and German to designate a kite bird, thus falling in line with the Federal Defence naming convention to often use animal names as designators for high-value weapon systems.

== Background ==
MILAN is a product of Euromissile, a Franco-West German missile development program dating back to the 1960s. The system entered service in 1972 as a second generation anti-tank weapon and soon became a standard anti-tank weapon throughout NATO, in use by most of the alliance's individual armies.

Consisting of two main components, the launcher and the missile, the MILAN system uses a semi-automatic command to line of sight (SACLOS) command guidance system. It tracks the missile either by a tail-mounted infrared lamp or an electronic-flash lamp, depending on the model. Because it is guided by wire by an operator, the missile cannot be affected by radio jamming or flares. However, drawbacks include short range, exposure of the operator, and problems with overland powerlines.

The MILAN 2 variant, which entered service with the French, German and British armies in 1984, uses an improved 115 mm high-explosive anti-tank (HEAT) shaped charge warhead. The MILAN 3 entered service with the French army in 1995 and features a new-generation localizer that makes the system more difficult to jam electronically.

== Variants ==
MILAN models

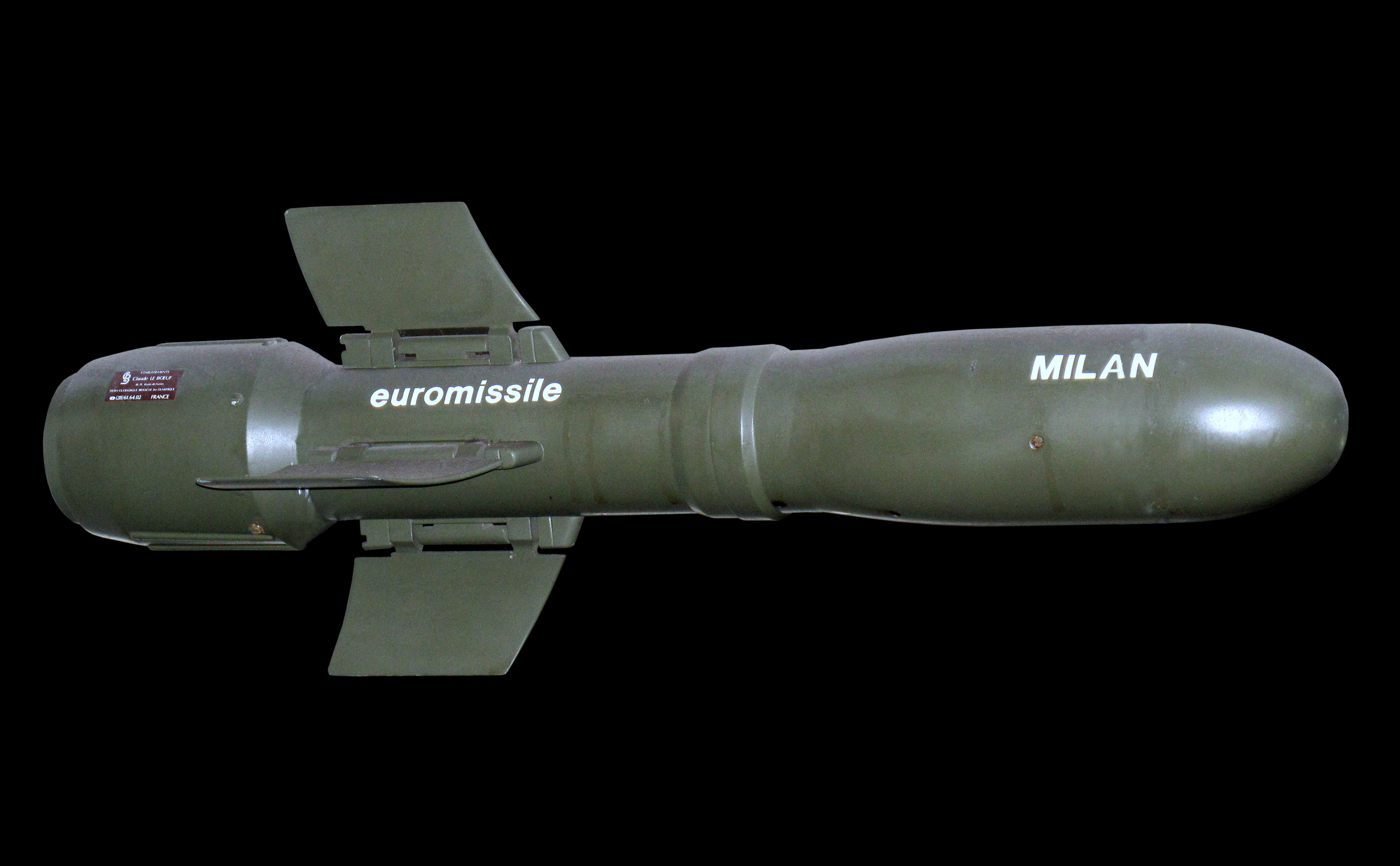
MILAN 1

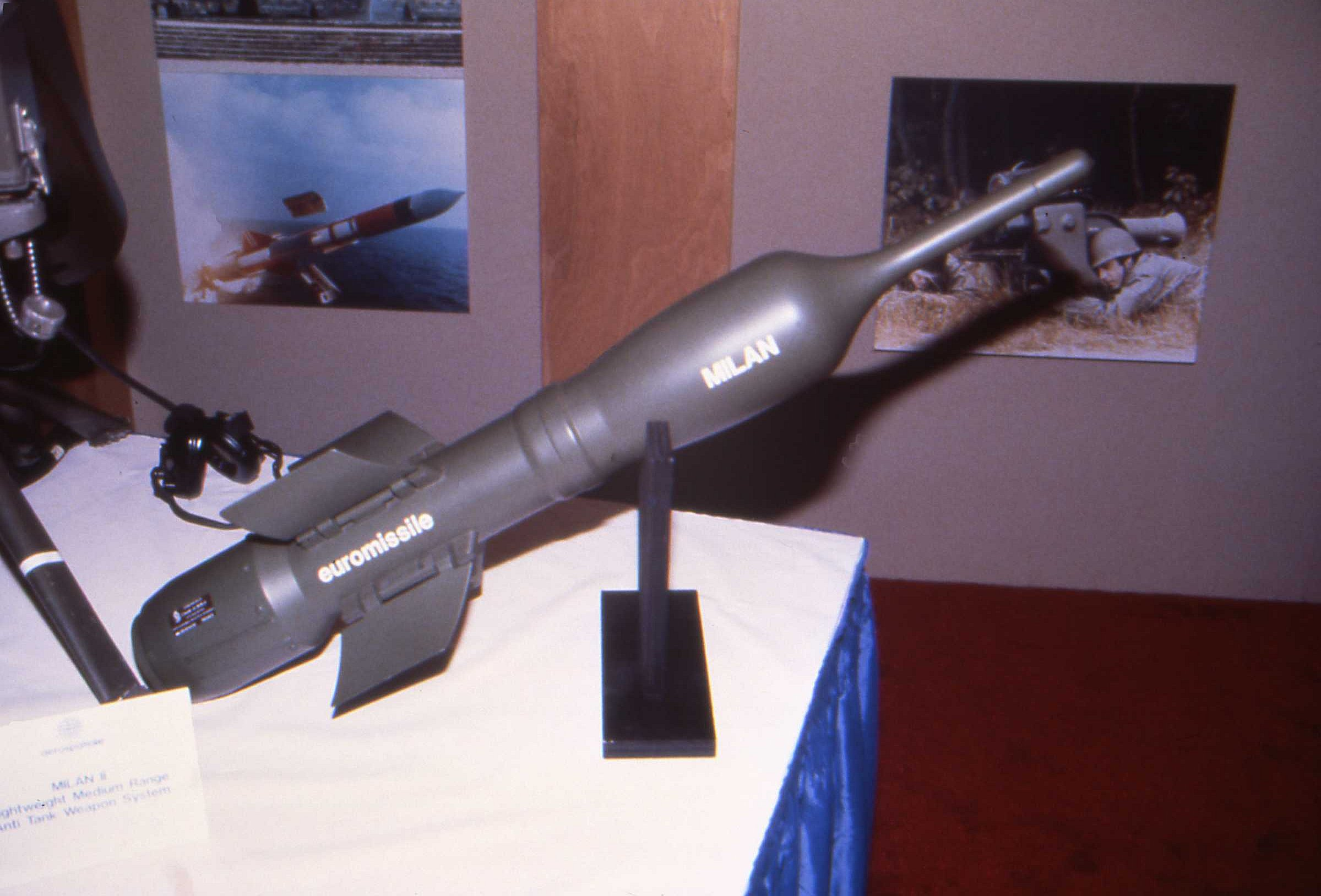
MILAN II with stand-off probe which almost doubles penetration

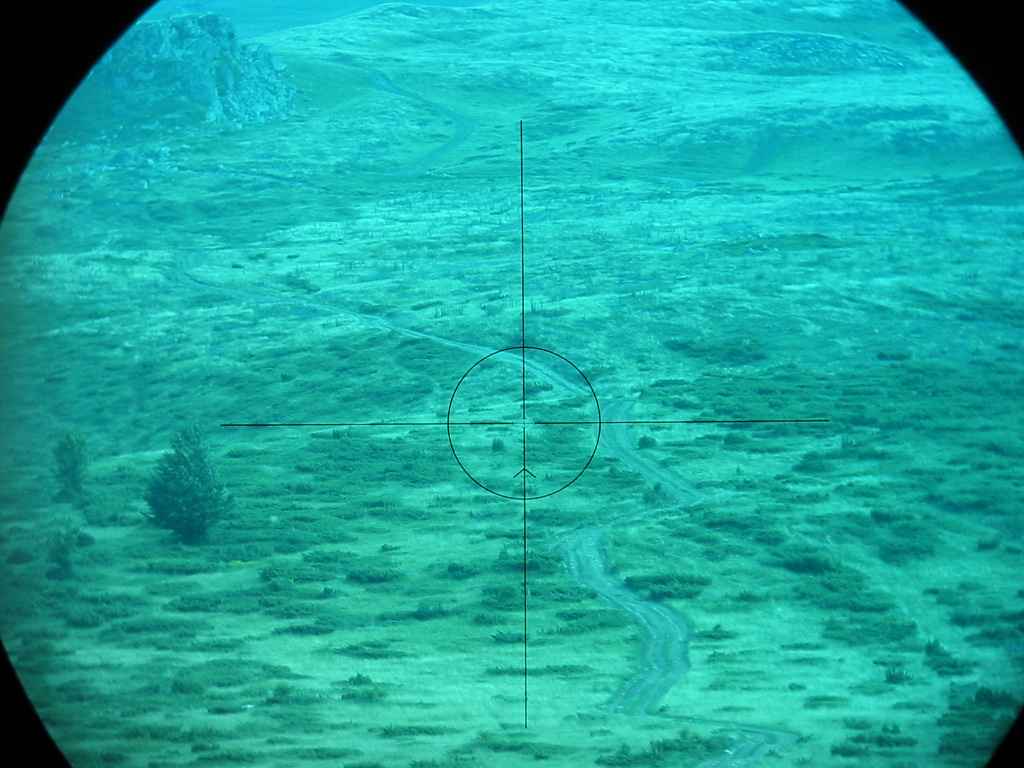
View through the optical sight

- MILAN 1: Single, main shaped charge warhead (1972), calibre 103 mm
- MILAN 2: Single, main shaped charge warhead, with standoff probe to increase penetration (1984) – see photo to right, calibre 115 mm
- MILAN 2T: Tandem shaped charge warheads to defeat reactive armour (1993)
- MILAN 3: Tandem, shaped charge warheads (1996) and electronic beacon to defeat Shtora jammer
- MILAN ER: Extended range (3,000 m) and improved penetration

The later MILAN models have tandem-charge HEAT warheads. This was done to keep pace with developments in Soviet armour technology: their tanks began to appear with explosive reactive armour (ERA), which could defeat earlier anti-tank guided missiles (ATGMs). The smaller precursor HEAT warhead penetrates and detonates the ERA tiles, exposing the way for the main HEAT warhead to penetrate the armour behind. Early missile versions used a simple flare to show the launch post their position left–right and above–below the crosshair, which then led to steering commands (SACLOS guidance). This was exploited with IR jammers such as Soviet Shtora that created a strong signal that was always on target, and thus led to wrong steering commands. The later electronic IR beacon used a coded signal sequence (switching between emitting and not emitting) that enabled the launch post to discern the missile's beacon from the jammer.

== Combat use ==
=== Afghanistan ===
MILAN missile systems were among the numerous weapons sent to the Mujahideen in Afghanistan in the 1980s by the United States to combat Soviet troops. The MILAN had a devastating effect on Soviet armor, having a similar effect on tanks and armored personnel carriers as Stinger missiles had on Soviet helicopters. In 2010, French troops killed four Afghan civilians in Kapisa Province using a MILAN system during a firefight.

=== Chadian–Libyan conflict ===
MILAN missiles provided by the French government saw common usage during the war between Chad and Libya where they were used by Chadian forces. Often mounted on Toyota pickup trucks, the missiles successfully engaged Libyan armour in the Aouzou Strip including T-55 tanks.

=== Falklands War ===
In 1982, the ruling military junta in Argentina launched the invasion of the UK overseas territory of the Falkland Islands, leading to the Falklands War. British forces used MILAN, along with the M72 LAW and Carl Gustaf, in a 'bunker buster' role. The MILAN saw use in the battles for Goose Green, Mount Longdon, Two Sisters and Wireless Ridge.

=== Gulf War ===
MILAN was used by both coalition and Iraqi forces during the Persian Gulf War, with a MILAN launcher operated by French forces claiming to have destroyed seven T-55 tanks. Iraqi operated MILAN missiles were supplied by the French government during the 1980s and were used by Iraqi forces during both Gulf Wars.

=== Iraq ===
In 2015, Germany supplied the Peshmerga with 30 MILAN launchers and over 500 missiles.

=== Syria ===
Syria ordered about 200 launchers and 4,000 missiles in 1977 which were delivered in 1978–1979 and used by the Syrians during the Lebanese Civil War. The Syrian army used Milan missiles against Israeli tanks in Lebanon in 1982. The missiles were in service during the Syrian Civil War, fielded by the Republican Guard.

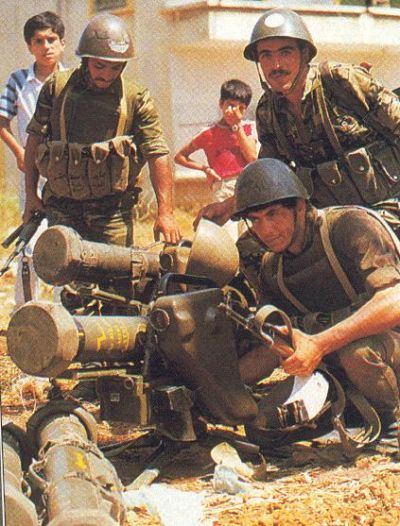
Syrian Milan team in Lebanon, 1982

==== Syrian civil war ====
Syrian rebels captured some MILANs in weapon depots of government forces, as did ISIL. The Kurdish YPG also used Milans supplied by the international coalition.

=== South Africa ===
The first Milan version was delivered to the Special Forces and the antitank platoons in the late 1970s and 1980s at a scale of six launchers per platoon. Each platoon was organised into three antitank sections, with two ATGM launchers and two M40A1 106 mm recoilless guns or two rocket launchers.

Six SADF MILAN teams were deployed by the Special Forces in support of the Angolan UNITA guerrillas, in the Cazombo Salient in 1985 during Operation Wallpaper.

=== Russian invasion of Ukraine ===
France has sent MILAN missiles to Ukraine during the 2022 Russian invasion of Ukraine.

== Operators ==
Operators: Current Former Non state operators are not shown

=== Current operators ===
MILAN missiles

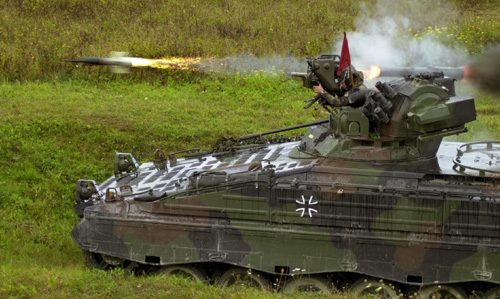
A Bundeswehr Marder infantry fighting vehicle firing.

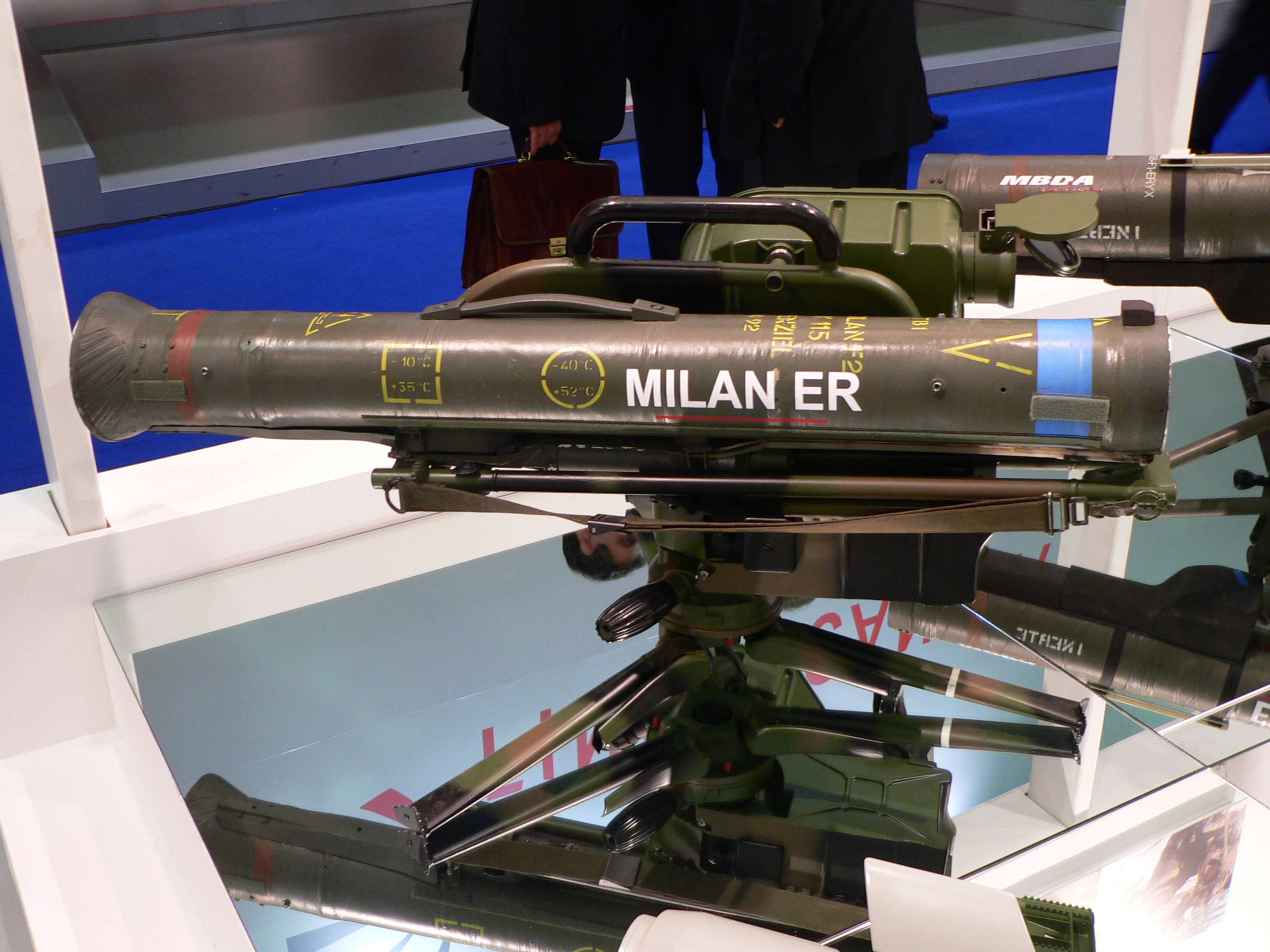
2007

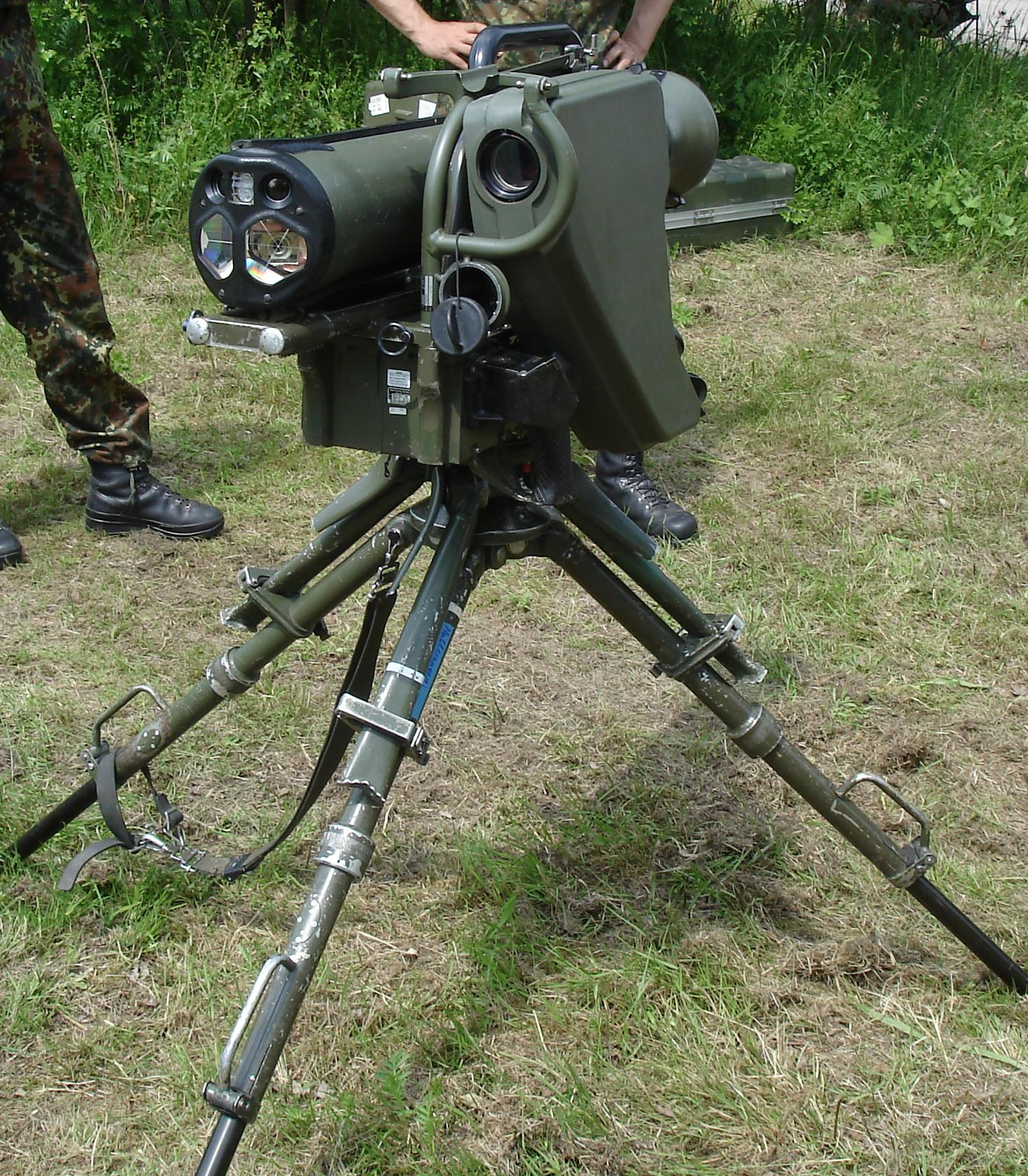
German Army missile equipped with AGDUS combat simulator.

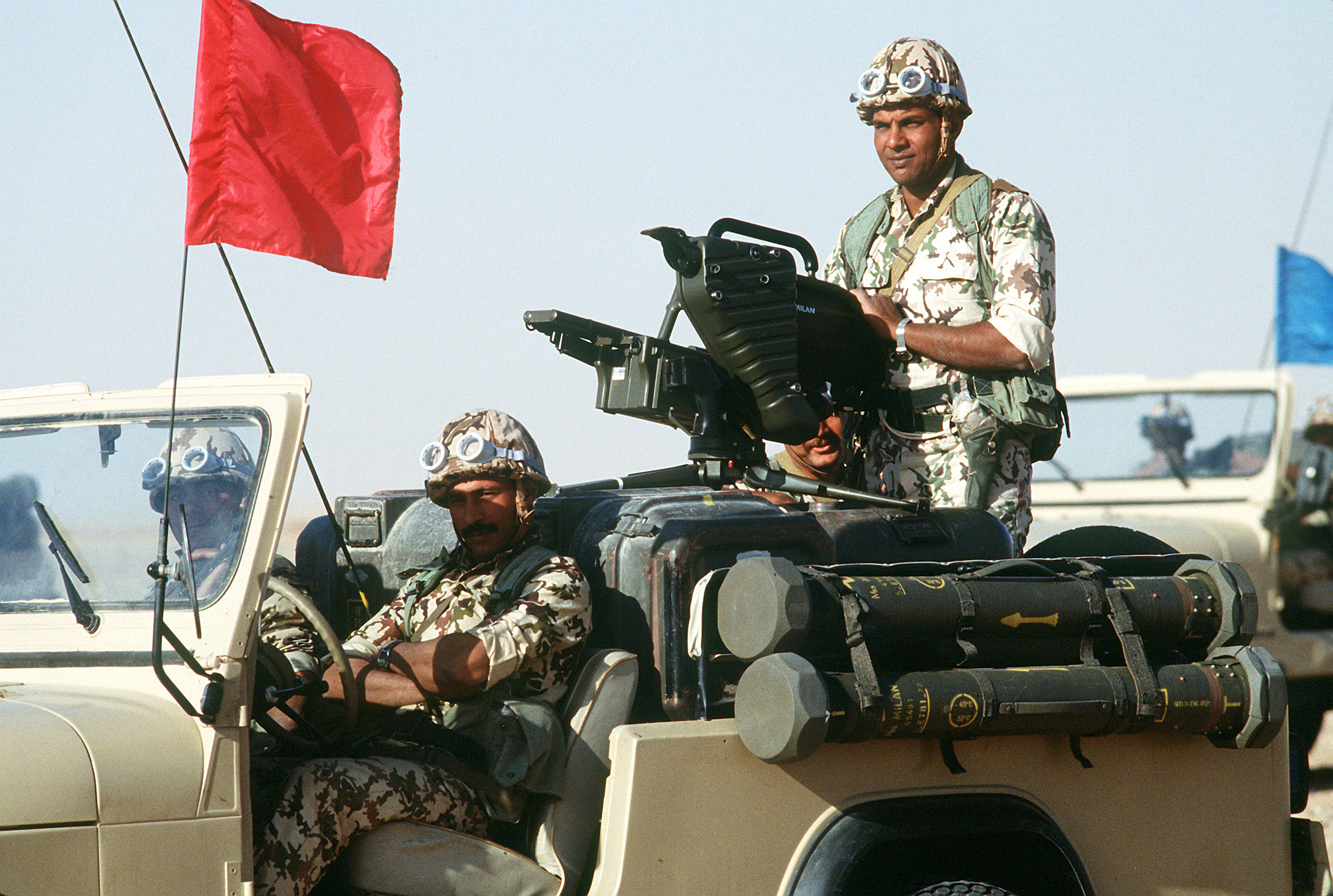
Vehicle mounted launcher and missiles in Egyptian service during Operation Desert Shield

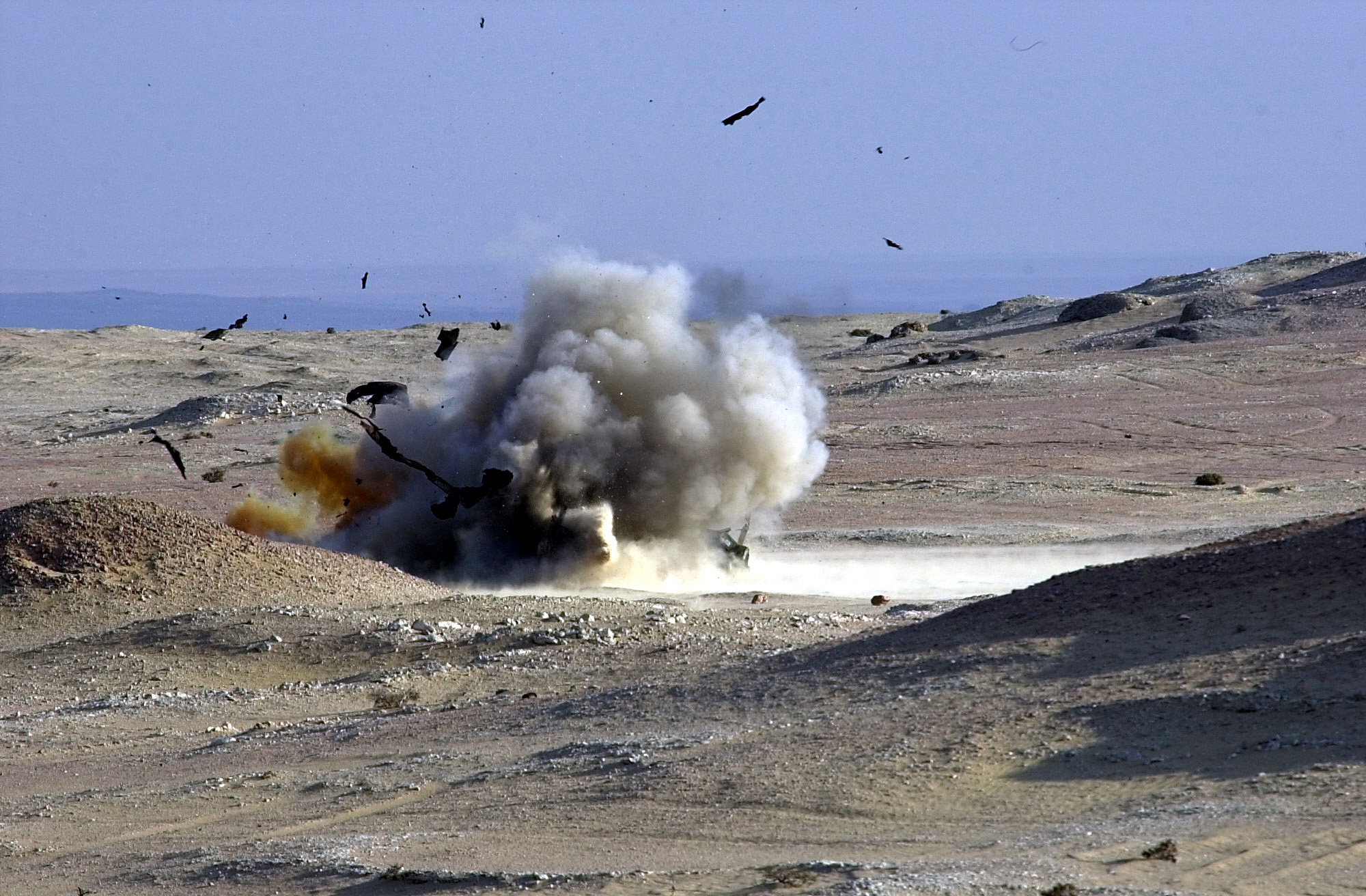
Strike on training target, 2001

- Afghanistan – Afghan National Army: 271
- Algeria – Algerian People's National Army: 340
- Bahrain - Royal Bahraini Army: mounted on 5 AIFV-B-Milan vehicles: 343
- Bosnia and Herzegovina - Armed Forces of Bosnia and Herzegovina: 90
- Botswana - Botswana Defence Force
- Burundi - Burundi Army (reported): 465
- Cameroon - Cameroon Army: 466
- Chad – Chadian Ground Forces: 469 mounted on light vehicles
- Cyprus – Cypriot National Guard: 95
- Egypt – Egyptian Army: 345
- France – French Army: Infantry and vehicle-mounted weapon.: 105 Will be replaced by Missile Moyenne Portée (MMP) from 2017.
- Gabon - Gabon Army: 478
- Germany – Bundeswehr: 109
- Greece – Hellenic Army: 112
- India – Indian Army: 34,100 MILAN-2T bought. License produced by Bharat Dynamics in India.
- Indonesia - Indonesian Army: 276
- Iraq – Iraqi Army
- Kurdistan – Peshmerga: 30 launchers and 500 missiles, delivery in two portions was announced on 31 August 2014 by German Bundeswehr. These are 1980s Milan 2 replaced by later models but still in storage. Used by the Kurds to stop ISIL vehicle-borne improvised explosive devices (VBIEDs).
- Italy – Italian Army Total of 714 launchers with 17,163 missile delivered in 1990. 807 MILAN 2T ordered in 2004 and delivered in 2005 (SIPRI).
- Jordan - mounted on 45 AIFV-B-Milan vehicles: 358
- Kenya – Kenyan Army: 483
- Lebanon – Lebanese Army: 362
- Libya – Libyan National Army: 1,000 MILAN-3 exported between 2008 and 2011, 400 systems in 2011.
- North Macedonia – Army of the Republic of Macedonia: 126
- Mauritania – Mauritanian Army: 365
- Mexico – Mexican Army: mounted on 8 Panhard VBL scout cars: 427
- Morocco – Royal Moroccan Army: 367
- Oman - Royal Army of Oman and Royal Household: 370
- Portugal – Portuguese Army; Portuguese Marines: 137
- PKK:
- Saudi Arabia - Saudi Arabian Army: 373
- Senegal - Senegalese Army: 496
- Singapore - Singapore Army: 307
- South Africa – South African Army: 375 missiles.
- Syria – Syrian Army: 377
  - (Syria) Free Syrian Army: Some captured.
  - YPG
  - Islamic State
- Tunisia – Tunisian Armed Forces: 120 missiles.
- Turkey – Turkish Army: 154
- Ukraine: some donated by France to support the Ukrainian army in war against Russia.
- United Arab Emirates: 381
- Uruguay – Uruguayan Army: 438
- Yemen – Yemeni Armed forces

=== Former operators ===
- Australia – Australian Army: Was used by infantry and mounted on vehicles. The Australian Army withdrew the MILAN from service in the early 1990s. The ADF now fields the FGM-148 Javelin system.
- Belgium – Belgian Army: Infantry weapon; replaced by Spike-LR in 2014
- Brazil – Brazilian Army
- Estonia – Estonian Defence Forces
- Ireland – Irish Army: Infantry weapon; replaced by the FGM-148 Javelin.
- Qatar
- Somalia - imported in 1978-1979
- Spain – Spanish Army
- UNITA: 150 missiles.
- United Kingdom – British Army; Royal Marines – While primarily an infantry weapon, it was also used in the FV120 Spartan MCT turret. Over 50,000 missiles were purchased for use in the British Armed Forces. The MILAN was deployed against Argentine bunkers in the Falklands conflict and later against T-55s during the Persian Gulf War. It was replaced by the FGM-148 Javelin in mid-2005. Previously made under licence by British Aerospace Dynamics.

== See also ==
- Akeron MP – (France)
- Eryx – (France)
- HOT – (West Germany)
- BGM-71 TOW – (United States)
- HJ-8 – (China)
