= Fada, Chad =

Fada فادا
- Town
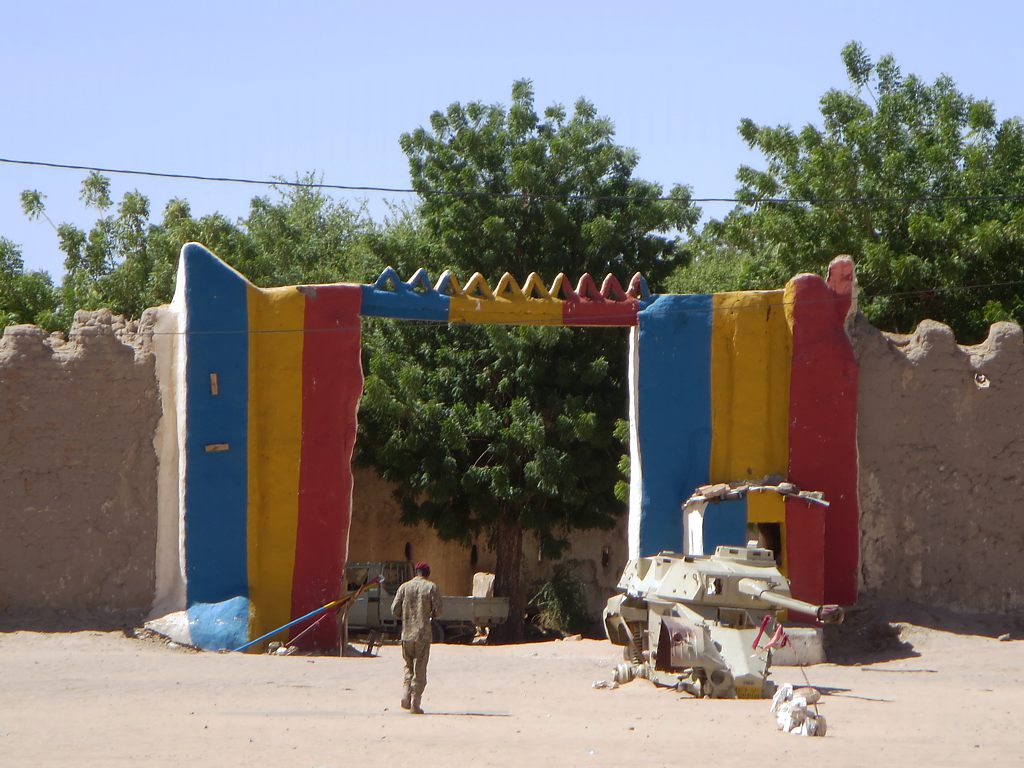
- French colonial fort

- Location in Chad
- Coordinates: 17°11′40″N 21°34′55″E
- Country: Chad
- Region: Ennedi-Ouest (since 2012)
- Department: Fada
- Sub-Prefecture: Fada
- Elevation: 1,844 ft (562 m)

Population (2005)
  - Total: 23,786
- Time zone: UTC+01:00 (WAT)

Fada (Arabic: فادا) or Houra in Zaghawa (the indigenous populations) is the capital of the Ennedi-Ouest Region of Chad, which was created in 2012 from the western half of the Ennedi Region.

Lying in the Ennedi Plateau, it has a population of 23,786 (as of December 2005). It is known for the surrounding cave paintings and rock formations, while the Guelta d'Archei and a wood growing in a wadi are local attractions.

During the Toyota War phase of the Chadian–Libyan War in 1987, the town saw fighting during the Battle of Fada.

The town is served by Fada Airport.

Topographic Map of the Ennedi Plateau. Fada is to the left of center.
