= Hassan Djamous =

Chadian Army Commander in Chief

Hassan Djamous (Arabic: حسن جاموس, killed April 1989) was a Chadian military commander and the Commander-in-Chief of the Chadian National Army and a cousin of former Chadian president Idriss Déby.

He led Chadian forces during the Chadian–Libyan War, such as the victory in the Battle of Maaten al-Sarra. According to military analyst Kenneth M. Pollack, Djamous was a capable commander whose mastery of maneuver warfare earned him comparisons with World War II German general Erwin Rommel.

Djamous was killed on orders of then-President Hissène Habré, who suspected him of plotting a coup d'état along with his cousin, Déby, and Mahamat Itno, Minister of the Interior; Déby was the only one of the three who survived.
