= Chadian National Armed Forces =

Army in Chad

The Chadian National Armed Forces (French: Forces Armées Nationales Tchadiennes, FANT) was the army of the central government of Chad from January 1983, when the President Hissène Habré's forces, in first place his personal Armed Forces of the North (FAN), were merged. Consisting of about 10,000 soldiers at that time, it swelled with the assimilation of former Chadian Armed Forces (FAT) and codos rebels from the south and, in 1986, with the addition of Transitional Government of National Unity (GUNT) soldiers who had turned against their Libyan allies. Freshly outfitted by France and the United States, FANT drove Libyan troops from their bases in northern Chad in a series of victories in 1987, during the Toyota War; but it dissolved defeated by the Patriotic Salvation Movement (MPS) led by Idriss Déby, who conquered the capital N'Djamena on December 2, 1990.
