= Battle of Massaguet =

2008 battle in Chad

- Part of the Chadian Civil War (2005–2010)
Date	February 1, 2008
Location	Massaguet and Massakory, Chad
Result	Rebel victory: Battle of N'Djamena (2008)

Belligerents
Chad; France (denied by France)	UFDD; RFC; UFDD-Fundamental

Commanders and leaders
Idriss Deby; Daoud Soumain †	Fizani Mahadjir; Mahamat Nouri; Abdelwahid About Makaye; Acheikh Ibn-Oumar; Timane Ermini

Strength
500-1000 men 70 vehicles 1 helicopter	3,000 men 1,300 vehicles

Casualties and losses
Heavy	Unknown

On February 1, 2008, forces from the Union of Forces for Democracy and Development (UFDD) led by Mahamat Nouri, the UFDD-Fundamental led by Abdelwahid About Makaye and Acheikh Ibn-Oumar and the Rally of Forces for Change (RFC) led by Timane Erdimi united under a military commanded by Fizani Mahadjir against the Chadian National Army. President Idriss Déby, who left with his men to fight the rebel coalition, narrowly escaped the battle.

== Background ==
The commander of the rebel group UFDD, Mahamat Nouri, broke peace accords that were signed in Sirte, Libya in October 2007 with his offensive a month later that ended in a heavy UFDD defeat. Nouri retreated back towards the Sudanese border and launched a second incursion into Chad with his forces in January 2008, this time joined by the UFDD-Fundamental led by Abdelwahid About Makaye and Acheikh Ibn-Oumar and the RFC led by Timane Erdimi. Three columns, composed of several hundred all-terrain vehicles, made up the forces and headed towards N'Djamena.

== Battle ==
On February 1, the French air force, which was intervening on behalf of the Chadian government in reconnaissance missions, spotted a column of rebels between Ati and N'Djamena. Deby went out to confront the rebels, sparking a first battle at Massakory. Fighting at Massakory was very fierce, and Chadian forces were eventually routed. A government helicopter piloted by Belarusian and Ukrainian mercenaries drew the rebels' attention and allowed Deby to evade capture.

Chadian forces retreated but were intercepted again near Massaguet by other rebel units. Deby once again evaded capture, but the army chief of staff Daoud Soumain was killed in his vehicle during the battle. The battle at Massaguet was extremely deadly for Chadian troops.

An article in La Croix stated on February 8 that French troops participated in the battle, on orders from Nicolas Sarkozy. French troops later defended the airport during the Battle of N'Djamena, which occurred one day later.
