= List of wars involving Chad =

This is a list of wars involving the Republic of Chad.

Conflict	Combatant 1	Combatant 2	Result
Arab Cold War (1952–1991 (Note: Some sources variously date the end of the period to c.1979 or F1990, particularly Yemeni unification, the end of the Lebanese Civil War, the Gulf War or the end of the Western Sahara War. Some sources say ongoing.))	Saudi Arabia; Kingdom of Iraq (until 1958); Ba'athist Iraq (1979–1990); Jordan; Morocco; Kingdom of Egypt (until 1953); Arab Republic of Egypt (since 1974); Syria (before 1954, 1961–1963); Right Wing of Fatah; Libya (until 1969); Federation of the Emirates of South Arabia / Federation of South Arabia (until 1967); Protectorate of South Arabia (until 1967); Kingdom of Yemen (until 1970); North Yemen (1970–1974, since 1978); Muscat and Oman (until 1970); Imamate of Oman (until 1959); Oman (since 1970); (Sultanate of Zanzibar) Zanzibar (until 1964); Bahrain; Kuwait; Qatar; Somalia (since 1977); Chad; Senegal; Comoros; Djibouti; Sudan (before 1969, since 1985); Trucial States (until 1971); United Arab Emirates (from 1971); Muslim Brotherhood; Arab Federation (1958): Iraq; Jordan; Supported by: United States; United Kingdom; France; Republic of China; People's Republic of China (from 1972; limited); Afghan mujahideen (from 1979); Canada; Ethiopia (until 1974); West Germany; Iran (until 1979); Israel; Italy; Japan; South Korea; Pakistan; Turkey; CENTO (until 1979)	Republic of Egypt (1953–1958); United Arab Republic (1958–1971); Arab Republic of Egypt (1971–1973); Iraqi Republic (1958–1968); Ba'athist Iraq (1968–1979, 1990−1991); Syrian Republic (1954–1958/1961); Ba'athist Syria (from 1963); Libya (after 1969); Algeria; Sudan (1969–1971); South Yemen; North Yemen (1962–1970, 1974–1978); Mauritania (until 1984); Somalia (1969–1977); Palestine Liberation Organization; Abu Nidal Organization; Polisario Front / Sahrawi Arab Democratic Republic; Arab Nationalist Movement; Ba'ath Party (until 1966); DLF(1963–1968); PFLOAG (1968–1974); NDFLOAG (1969–1971); PFLO (1974–1976); Hezbollah (from 1985); Federation of Arab Republics; Arab Islamic Republic United Arab States (1958–1961): United Arab Republic; Kingdom of Yemen; Supported by: Soviet Union (until 1989); People's Republic of China (until 1972); Afghanistan (from 1978); Bulgaria (until 1989); Cuba (since 1959); Czechoslovakia (until 1989); (Derg) Ethiopia (from 1974); East Germany; Hungary (until 1989); India (limited); Iran (from 1979; limited); North Korea; Poland (until 1989); Romania (until 1989; limited); Yugoslavia (limited)	Inconclusive: Decline of pan-Arabism and Nasserism after the death of Gamal Abdel Nasser; Rise of Wahhabism, Salafi jihadism, and Islamism after the death of Nasser; International propagation of Salafism and Wahhabism in several countries financed with Saudi oil exports; Beginning of the 1969 Somali coup d'état, establishing the Somali Democratic Republic; Creation of Gulf Cooperation Council; Failed attempts of an Arab Union: Arab Federation; United Arab Republic; United Arab States; Federation of Arab Republics; United Arab Kingdom; Union of Arab Republics; Arab Islamic Republic; Successful attempts of an Arab Union: Unity of nine Arab emirates to form UAE; Yemeni unification
Chadian Civil War (1965–1979)	FROLINAT (from 1966): First Liberation Army (until 1975); Second Liberation Army (1968–76); Third Liberation Army (from 1968); Various splinter factions; (Chad) FLT (until 1975) (Chad) Volcan Army (from 1970) (Chad) FAP (from 1976) (Chad) FAN (1976–78, 1979); Tribal and peasant rebels (Libyan Arab Republic) (History of Libya under Muammar Gaddafi) Libya (1969–72, from 1975); Supported by: Algeria; Kingdom of Libya (non-combat, until 1969)	Chad: Chadian Armed Forces; FROLINAT's First Liberation Army (c. 1975); FAN (1978–79); France; Supported by: Egypt; Israel	Rebel victory: Overthrow and death of François Tombalbaye in 1975; Overthrow of Félix Malloum in 1979; Signing of Lagos Accord and installation of Transitional Government of National Unity
Chadian–Libyan conflict (1978–1987)	Anti-Libyan Chadian factions: FAT (1978–1979); FAN (1978–1983); FANT (1983–1987); GUNT (1986–1987); France; Inter-African Force: Zaire; Nigeria; Senegal; NFSL Supported by: DR Sudan (1978–1985); Sudan (1985–1987); Egypt (1977-1981); Israel; Iraq; Algeria (pre-reapproachment); United States	Libya: Islamic Legion; Pro-Libyan Chadian factions: FROLINAT; GUNT (1979–1986); Codos (1983–1986); FAP (1978–1986); Pro-Libyan Palestinian and Lebanese groups: PLO (1987); Abu Nidal Organization; Supported by: Algeria; East Germany; Soviet Union	Chadian and French victory: Chad regains control of the Aouzou Strip.
Toyota War (1986 – 1987)	Libya; CDR; PLO	FANT; FAP; France (Opération Épervier)	Decisive Chadian and French victory: Ceasefire agreement; Expulsion of Libyan forces from Chad
First Congo War (1996–1997)	Zaire: FAZ; White Legion; Sudan; Chad (Rwanda) Ex-FAR/ALiR; Interahamwe; CNDD-FDD; UNITA; ADF; FLNC; Supported by: France; Central African Republic; China; Israel; Kuwait (denied) Mai-Mai (Note: Many Mai-Mai militias in eastern Zaire initially allied themselves with Rwanda and the AFDL against Hutu militants and refugees. As soon as most Hutu were driven away, however, many Mai-Mai groups turned against Rwanda and the AFDL. Despite this, some anti-Hutu Mai-Mai remained allied with Rwanda and the AFDL.)	(Democratic Republic of the Congo) AFDL; Rwanda; Uganda; Burundi; Angola (South Sudan) SPLA; Eritrea; Supported by: South Africa; Zambia; Zimbabwe; Ethiopia; Tanzania; United States (covertly) Mai-Mai	AFDL victory: Overthrow of the Mobutu regime; Zaire renamed back to the Democratic Republic of the Congo; Installation of Laurent-Désiré Kabila as president; Beginning of Second Congo War
Second Congo War (1998–2003)	Pro-government: DR Congo; Angola; Chad; Namibia; Zimbabwe; Sudan (alleged); Anti-Ugandan forces: LRA; ADF; UNRF II; FNI; Anti-Rwandan militias: FDLR; (Rwanda) ALiR; Interahamwe; RDR; Mai-Mai; Other Hutu-aligned forces; Anti-Burundi militias: CNDD-FDD; FROLINA	Rwandan-aligned militias: RCD; RCD-Goma; Banyamulenge; Ugandan-aligned militias: MLC; Forces for Renewal; UPC; Other Tutsi-aligned forces; Anti-Angolan forces: UNITA; Foreign state actors: Uganda; Rwanda; Burundi; Note: Rwanda and Uganda fought a short war in June 2000 over Congolese territory.	Stalemate: Assassination of Laurent-Désiré Kabila; Sun City Agreement; Creation of a unified, multi-party government in DR Congo, with Joseph Kabila as president; Pretoria Accord; Rwandan withdrawal from DR Congo in exchange for commitment towards the disarmament of Hutu militias.; The Transitional Government of the Democratic Republic of the Congo is established, deployment of MONUC.; End of the Angolan Civil War.; Continuation of the Ituri conflict.; Start of the Kivu conflict.
Central African Republic Bush War (2004 – 2007)	Rebels: Union of Democratic Forces for Unity (UFDR); People's Army for the Restoration of Democracy (APRD); Convention of Patriots for Justice and Peace (CPJP); Movement of Central African Liberators for Justice (MLCJ)...and others: Patriotic Convention for Saving the Country (CPSK); Democratic Front of the Central African People (FDPC); FDC; GALPC; FPR	Central African Republic; Chad	Violence persists despite an April 2007 peace agreement; Eventual outbreak of a second civil war in 2012
Chadian Civil War (2005 – 2010)	Chad; France; Libya (Sudan) NMRD (Note: Inglés National Movement for Reform and Development); JEM (Note: Inglés Justice and Equality Movement); Supported by: Ukraine; Israel; Romania	Rebels: FUC (Note: Francés Front uni pour le changement); UFDD (Note: Francés Union des forces pour la démocratie et le développement); RFD (Note: Francés Rassemblement des forces pour le changement); CNT (Note: Francés Concorde Nationale Tchadienne); CDR (Note: Francés Conseil démocratique révolutionnaire); UFDP (Note: Francés Union des Forces Démocratiques pour le Progrès); RDL (Note: Francés Rassemblement pour la démocratie et la liberté); UFDD-F (Note: Francés Union des Forces pour la démocratie et le développement-Fondamentale); SCUD (Note: Francés Socle pour le changement, l'unité et la démocratie); CNR (Note: Francés Conseil National du Redressement); URF (Note: Francés Union des forces de la résistance); UFCD (Note: Francés Union des forces pour le changement et la démocratie); FSR (Note: Francés Front pour le salut de la République); UFR (Note: Francés Union des Forces de Résistance); UMC (Note: Alianza formada en 2008 por el UFDD, el UFDD-F y el RFC.); FPRN (Note: Francés Front populaire pour la renaissance nationale); UDC (Note: Francés Union démocratique pour le changement); MPRD (Note: Francés Mouvement Populaire pour la Renaissance et le Developpement); (Sudan) Janjaweed; Alleged support: Sudan (until 2010)	Government victory
Boko Haram insurgency (2009 – present)	Multinational Joint Task Force: Nigeria; Cameroon; Chad; Niger; Benin; Turkey	Boko Haram (partially aligned with ISIL from 2015) (Note: Following Mohammed Yusuf's death, Boko Haram splintered into numerous factions which no longer operated under a unified leadership. Though Abubakar Shekau eventually became the preeminent commander of the movement, he never really controlled all Boko Haram groups. Instead the factions were loosely allied, but also occasionally clashed with each other. This situation changed in 2015, when Shekau pledged allegiance to ISIL. The leadership of ISIL eventually decided to replace Shekau as local commander with Abu Mus'ab al-Barnawi, whereupon the movement split completely. Shekau no longer recognized the authority of ISIL's central command, and his loyalists started to openly fight the followers of al-Barnawi. Regardless, Shekau did never officially renounce his pledge of allegiance to ISIL as a whole; his forces are thus occasionally regarded as "second branch of ISWAP". Overall, the relation of Shekau with ISIL remains confused and ambiguous.): Shekau faction; Several minor factions; (Islamic State) ISWAP (originally Barnawi faction of Boko Haram; from 2016) Ansaru (Note: The exact origin of Ansaru is unclear, but it had already existed as Boko Haram faction before officially announcing its foundation as separate group on 1 January 2012. The group has no known military presence in Nigeria since 2015, but several of its members appear to be still active.)	Ongoing (Map of the current military situation): Expansion of conflict into neighboring Cameroon, Chad, Mali, and Niger; Coalition offensive in 2015 forces Boko Haram to retreat into the Sambisa Forest; Abubakar Shekau killed on 19 May 2021 amid ISWAP's capture of Sambisa Forest
Chadian intervention in northern Mali (2013 – present)	Chad Mali	AQIM MUJAO	Ongoing
Insurgency in Northern Chad (2016 – present)	Chad France JEM	FACT CCMSR UFR FNDJT	Ongoing: Idriss Déby was killed in action, during the Northern Chad offensive; Mahamat Déby Itno becomes his successor, along established himself as the Chairman of the Transitional Military Council and dissolves the Chadian parliament after death of Idriss Déby

== Sources ==
- Cooper, Tom; Grandolini, Albert (2015). Libyan Air Wars: Part 1: 1973–1985 (online ed.). Havertown: Helion and Company. ISBN 978-1-910777-51-0.
- Plaut, Martin (2016). Understanding Eritrea: Inside Africa's Most Repressive State. Oxford: Oxford University Press. ISBN 978-0-19-066959-1.
- Prunier, Gérard (July 2004). "Rebel Movements and Proxy Warfare: Uganda, Sudan and the Congo (1986-99)". African Affairs. 103 (412): 359–383. doi:10.1093/afraf/adh050. JSTOR 3518562.
- Prunier, Gérard (2009). Africa's World War: Congo, the Rwandan Genocide, and the Making of a Continental Catastrophe. Oxford: Oxford University Press. ISBN 978-0-19-970583-2.
- Reyntjens, Filip (2009). The Great African War: Congo and Regional Geopolitics, 1996-2006. Cambridge University Press. ISBN 978-0-521-11128-7.
- Pollack, Kenneth Michael (2004). Arabs at War: Military Effectiveness, 1948–1991. Lincoln: University of Nebraska Press. ISBN 978-0-8032-0686-1.
- Warner, Jason; Hulme, Charlotte (2018). "The Islamic State in Africa: Estimating Fighter Numbers in Cells Across the Continent" (PDF). CTC Sentinel. 11 (7). West Point, New York: Combating Terrorism Center: 21–28. Archived from the original (PDF) on 2019-08-08.
- Seale, Patrick (1992). Abu Nidal: a gun for hire. Random House. ISBN 0-679-40066-4.
- TRADOC G-2 (2015). Threat Tactics Report: Boko Haram (PDF). Fort Eustis: United States Army Training and Doctrine Command.
- "Curbing Violence in Nigeria (II): The Boko Haram Insurgency" (PDF). Africa Report (216). Brussels: International Crisis Group. 3 April 2014. Archived from the original (PDF) on 17 January 2016.
