= List of conflicts in Chad =

Map showing the present-day location of the Republic of Chad (green) within Central Africa.

This is a list of conflicts in Chad arranged chronologically from medieval to modern times. This list includes both nationwide and international types of war, including the following: wars of independence, liberation wars, colonial wars, undeclared wars, proxy wars, territorial disputes, and world wars. Also listed might be any battle that occurred within the territory of what is today known as the, "Republic of Chad" but was itself only part of an operation of a campaign of a theater of a war. There may also be periods of violent civil unrest listed, such as: riots, shootouts, spree killings, massacres, terrorist attacks, and civil wars. The list might also contain episodes of: human sacrifice, mass suicide, massacres, and genocides.

== Medieval times ==
=== Kanem Empire ===
Map showing the influence of the Kanem Empire c. 1200.

- c. 1203 — c. 1243 Dunama Dabbalemi, of the Sayfawa dynasty, mai of the Kanem Empire, declared jihad against the surrounding tribes and initiated an extended period of conquest.
- c. 1342 — c. 1388 Fall of Kanem
  - c. 1342 — c. 1352 Sao Resurgence
  - c. 1376 — c. 1388 Bulala Invasion

== Modern times ==
=== Ouaddai Empire ===
- 1870 — 22 April 1900 Rabih az-Zubayr ibn Fadl Allah's War
- 1909 — 1911 Ouaddai War (Ouadddai Empire)

=== French Chad ===
- 1870 — 22 April 1900 Rabih az-Zubayr ibn Fadl Allah's War in French Chad
- 1909 — 1911 Ouaddai War
- 1915, 15 November 1917 Massacre des coupes-coupes (in Arabic: Kabkab Massacre, مجزرة كبكب) meaning cut-cut and referring to the beheading of 400 Muslim Scholars from various parts of Chad in one of the rarely recorded French massacres in Africa.

=== Republic of Chad ===
- November 1, 1965 Mangalmé riots
- 1965 — 2010 War in Chad
  - 1965 — 2010 Chadian Civil War
    - 1965 — 1979 Civil war in Chad
    - 1979 — 1982 Civil war in Chad
    - 1998 — 2002 Civil war in Chad
    - 18 December 2005 — 15 January 2010 Civil war in Chad
      - 18 December 2005 Battle of Adré
      - 6 January 2006 Borota raid
      - 6 March 2006 Amdjereme raid
      - 13 April 2006 Battle of N'Djamena
      - 1 May 2006 Dalola raid
      - 2 February 2008 — 4 February 2008 Battle of N'Djamena
      - 18 June 2008 Battle of Am Zoer
      - 7 May 2009 Battle of Am Dam
      - 24 April 2010 — 28 April 2010 Battle of Tamassi
  - 1978 — 1987 Chadian—Libyan conflict
    - 1983 — 1984 Operation Manta
    - 13 February 1986 — 2014 Opération Épervier
    - 1986 Tibesti War
    - 16 December 1986 — 11 September 11, 1987 Toyota War
- 11 April 2002 — ongoing Insurgency in the Maghreb

== See also ==
- Chadian Ground Forces
- Chadian Air Force
- Military history of Africa
- African military systems up until the year 1800 CE
- African military systems between the years 1800 CE and 1900 CE
- African military systems after the year 1900 CE
