= Battle of Am Zoer =

2008 battle in Chadian Civil War

- Part of the Chadian Civil War (2005–10)
Date	June 18, 2008
Location	Am Zoer, Chad
Result	Government victory

Belligerents
UFDD rebels UFDD-F rebels RFC rebels	Chadian National Army

Commanders and leaders
Mahamat Nouri; Aboud Mackaye; Timane Erdimi	Idriss Déby Itno

Casualties and losses
160–400 killed 20 captured	3 dead

The Battle of Am Zoer occurred on June 18, 2008 when the Chadian army caught up with a rebel column that had been advancing towards the capital, N'Djamena. Sudanese forces were reported to have attacked Chadian positions on the border in previous days and the rebels had been seen passing through several eastern villages. The Chadian army engaged the rebels near the town of Am Zoer and routed them killing over 150 and capturing 20. Dozens of military vehicles were also recovered and three government soldiers died.

== Sources ==
https://web.archive.org/web/20110520141838/http://afp.google.com/article/ALeqM5hGXCr7VUY5_C4yMSEujqcTZw4lyg
