= Bir Kalait =

Kalait بئر كلايت
- Town
- Bir Kalait
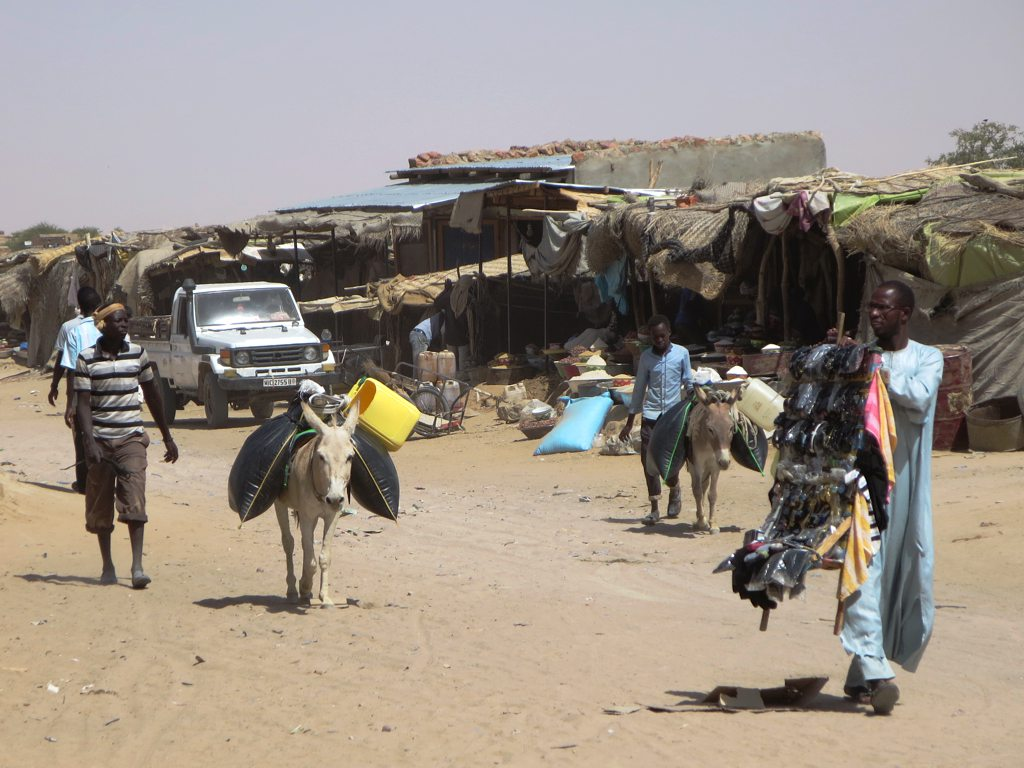

- Location in Chad
- Coordinates: 15°50′0″N 20°54′0″E
- Country: Chad
- Region: Ennedi Ouest
- Department: Mourtcha
- Subprefecture: Kalait

Government
  - Mayor: Wordougou Hissein Hangatta
- Elevation: 469 m (1,539 ft)

Population (2009)
  - Total: 21,313
- Time zone: UTC+1 (WAT)

Bir Kalait or Bir Kalaït (Arabic: بئر كلايت), informally called Kalait and formerly considered part of another town, Oum-Chalouba, is a town in Kalait Subprefecture, Mourtcha Department, on the regional border of the Wadi Fira and Ennedi Ouest regions of Chad. The 'Bir' in its name implies it's populated because of the presence of wells that were originally found at its location in the middle of the Sahara. These wells historically hosted hundreds of families of Toubou and Arab nomadic herders who considered Kalait a buffer zone between the Sahara and the Sahel. As of the 2009 census, Kalait had a population of 21,313 people; 12,050 men and 9,263 women.

== Climate and geology ==
The town is characterized as being in a hot desert climate (BWh Köppen climate classification). The average annual air temperature is 28.9 °C. The average temperature of the coldest month (January) is 23.2 °C, and the hottest month (June) is 32.8 °C. The estimated long-term precipitation rate is 118mm. The amount of precipitation is distributed unevenly throughout the year, with the bulk of it falling between May and October. The greatest amount of precipitation falls in August (63mm) on average.

Despite its location and environmentally hostile climate, many unexpected species have been observed in and around the town, including house sparrows.

Kalait is a granite massif (mountain or rocky outcrop). There are sandy or superficially sandy zones around the granite massifs in the region. In the valley of Ouadi Sérérié, the water table (groundwater level) is at a depth of 15 meters at Kalait and the region where Kalait is located is described as a piedmont (foothill) area of the Kapka granite massifs, characterized by eroded plateaus, numerous ravines, and chaotic landscapes where granite bedrock frequently appears. Water is scarce in the entire piedmont region including Kalait. When groundwater exists, it's not abundant and often dries up during the dry season. Kalait is also known for its strong sandstorms.

== History ==
Kalait had strategic military importance during the Chad-Libya conflict of the 1980s, serving both as a target during offensives and as a staging ground for military operations that Libyan refugees fled to. As part of the 1982 coup d'état by the Armed Forces of the North of Hissène Habré against the People's Armed Forces of Goukouni Oueddei, there was a particularly violent, three-day-long battle in Kalait. Then a year later in July 1983, during the conflict between Hissène Habré's forces and Goukouni Oueddei's coalition (supported by Libya), Goukouni's army captured Kalait along with Oum Chalouba as part of their southward offensive after taking Faya Largeau. In December 1986, FANT (Habré's National Armed Forces of Chad) troops assembled at Kalait to prepare an assault on Fada, which was occupied by Libyan and CDR soldiers. Around the same time, the French government requested batteries of new 20-foot-long SAM-6 anti-aircraft missiles surrounding a military base in Ouadi Doum, undamaged by the war at the time, to be sent to a Chadian base in Kalait to be protected from the Libyans, after having bombed the town for three months as part of Operation Épervier. Kalait also served as a strategic location and major depot where FANT forces organized supplies and intelligence before their successful January 2, 1987 attack on Fada, which became a model for subsequent attacks on Libyan garrisons, prompting CIA involvement. Libya continued to bomb Kalait and surrounding settlements in the Borkou-Ennedl-Tlbestl region numerous times until the end of the war in September 1987.

Kalait was one of several locations in Chad where mine-clearance and explosive ordnance disposal teams were deployed as part of the country's mine action program. This deployment occurred around 2004 as part of "Phase Three" of Chad's mine-action strategy.

In 2007, two conflicts occurred in Kalait as part of the Chadian Civil War between the military forces of Chad and the Rally of Forces for Change rebel group, covered by both Radio France Internationale and BBC Monitoring. The clash began with aerial bombardment ordered by Timane Erdimi, but by the end there were no fatalities and no change of territory either. As of 2013, the Chadian military still maintains a military base in Kalait.

In 2012, a Beechcraft 1900D aircraft scheduled from N'Djamena and belonging to the Chadian government, crashed upon landing in the town's airport. All 17 passengers (2 crew and 15 passengers) survived. The official circumstances of the crash were:

"The twin engine aircraft departed N'Djamena on a flight to Bir Kalait, carrying 15 passengers and two pilots, among them a delegation of the Presidency. On short final, the aircraft named 'Am Djerass' was too low and struck the ground short of runway threshold. Upon impact, the undercarriage were torn off. The aircraft slid on its belly for about 200 metres before coming to rest in a sandy area with all propeller blades separated. The aircraft was damaged beyond repair but all 17 occupants escaped uninjured, among the Idriss Déby, President of the Tchad Republic who was flying to Bir Kalait to take part to the Peace and Development Forum for the Borku-Ennedi-Tibesti Region."

== NGO involvement ==
In 2011, the International Organization for Migration reported that Kalait lies at the end of a route from Niger known for banditry and organized robberies, and set up transit centers to run humanitarian and evacuation support, medical care, and psychosocial support; assisting 77% of immigrants arriving in Kalait re-emigrate back to their countries of origin. In 2014, the United Nations High Commissioner for Refugees labelled Kalait a 'place of interest' for possible refugee camps. In 2022, Global Initiative Against Transnational Organized Crime claimed Kalait was located along a 'major human smuggling route' and was itself a 'trafficking hub'.

In 2011, the World Bank built a regional pesticide storage facility and a secondary regional locust monitoring base in Kalait as part of the Africa Emergency Locust Project because desert locusts migrate to Kalait's region during November.
