= Abderaman Koulamallah =

Chadian politician (born 1955)

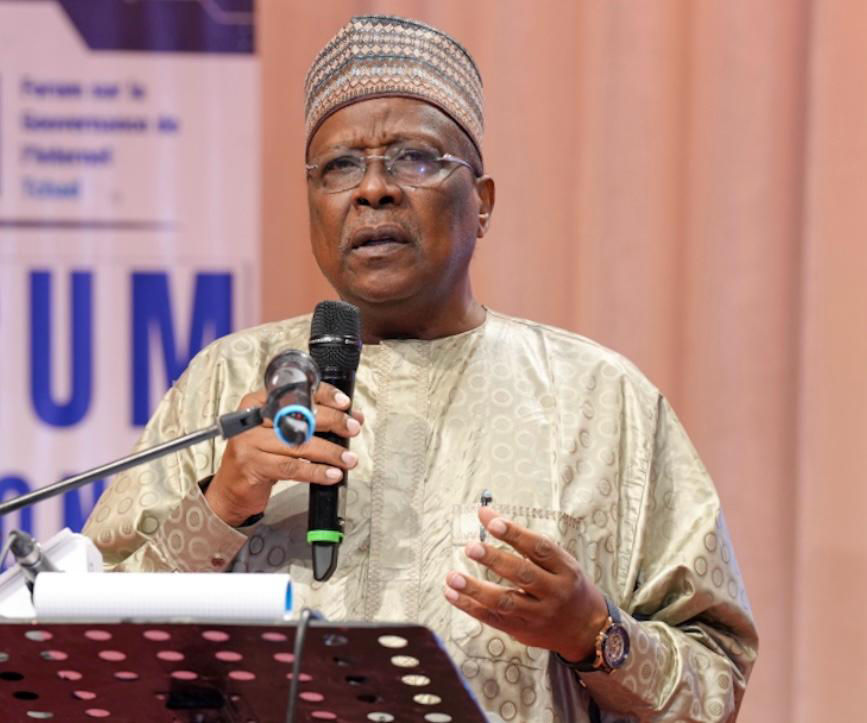

Minister of State, Minister of Foreign Affairs, African Integration and Chadians Abroad and International Cooperation, Government Spokesperson
- Incumbent
- Assumed office 27 May 2024
- President: Mahamat Déby
- Prime Minister: Allamaye Halina
- Preceded by: Mahamat Saleh Annadif

Minister of Communication
- In office 2 January 2024 – 24 May 2024
- President: Mahamat Déby
- Prime Minister: Succès Masra
- Preceded by: Aziz Mahamat Saleh
- Succeeded by: Boukar Michel
- In office 2 May 2021 – 14 October 2022
- President: Mahamat Déby
- Prime Minister: Albert Pahimi Padacké
- Preceded by: Cherif Mahamat Zene
- Succeeded by: Aziz Mahamat Saleh

Minister of National Reconciliation
- In office 14 October 2022 – 2 January 2024
- President: Mahamat Déby
- Prime Minister: Albert Pahimi Padacké
- Preceded by: Acheikh Ibn-Oumar

Personal details
- Born: 1955 (age 70–71)
- Party: UDT

Abderaman Koulamallah (Arabic: عبد الرحمن كلام الله; born in 1955) is a Chadian politician, former rebel, and member of the Chadian Democratic Union (UDT). He is the former leader of the 2008 attempt to overthrow Chad's former president, Idriss Déby, in a culmination of the battle of N'Djamena. He is the son of Ahmed Koulamallah.

== Biography ==
In 1996, he was prevented from running in the presidential election because of his mother's Sudanese origins, but his half-brother (same father) was allowed to run in 2006. Koulamallah then joined Timan Erdimi's Rally of Forces for Change (RFC) and became the spokesperson for the Unified Military Command. He is the president of the Chadian Democratic Union (UDT), represented in the National Assembly.

In January 2009, he joined the Union of Resistance Forces (UFR), a grouping of the eight main armed movements opposed to former Chad's President Idriss Déby; Koulamallah became its spokesperson. The UFR later splits into two in May 2010. The failed N'Djamena offensive led by General Mahamat Nouri's National Alliance was followed by disagreements over who would take political power once Déby was overthrown between the various rebel factions. He was imprisoned in absentia for "undermining state security" before being pardoned by President Idriss Déby 17 days later on May 24, 2011. On June 7, 2011, he returned to Chad after an agreement with the Chadian government. On June 8, a day later, security forces arrested Koulamallah following his return from exile. In 2015, Koulamallah published The Battle of N'Djamena. There is a story in which he recounts the attack of February 2, 2008, by the rebel coalition hostile to the power of Idriss Déby.

On August 24, 2018, upon the death of the president, Idriss Déby, in April 2021, he was the advisor in charge of the mission to the Presidency of the Republic. On May 2, 2021, the Transitional Military Council that took power after the death of Idriss Déby appointed Koulamallah to the positions of Minister of Communication and spokesperson for the "transitional" government. He replaces Chérif Mahamat Zene. In October 2022, after the end of the sovereign national dialogue, Koulamallah is appointed Minister of National Reconciliation in the government of Saleh Kebzabo. In January 2024, Koulamallah becomes Minister of Communication again in the government of Succès Masra. Koulamallah was appointed the Minister of State, Minister of Foreign Affairs, and government spokesperson with the government of the Fifth Republic of Prime Minister Allamaye Halina.
