= Battle of Biltine =

2006 battle

- Part of the Chadian Civil War
Date	25 November 2006
Location	Biltine, Chad 14.3139°N 20.5536°E
Result	Rebel victory

Belligerents
UFDD: RADF	Chad: Chadian Army

Commanders and leaders
unknown	(Chad) Idriss Déby Itno (Chad) Mas-Oud Diresse

Strength
unknown	1,200

Casualties and losses
50 killed	~100 killed
- Location within Chad

The Battle of Biltine (2006), was an armed confrontation between the Chadian military and armed rebel groups, notably the UFDD.

== Battle ==
Three columns of Chadian soldiers attacked rebel positions just outside Biltine at around 6:30 am, and after three hours of intense fighting, the government attack was repulsed. Fighting was reported to have been extremely fierce and left dozens of dead on both sides. UFDD spokesmen Ali Moussa Izzo claimed that many government soldiers abandoned their positions and joined the rebels after the attack evidently failed, while others fled. At 12:00, rebel mobile columns attacked Biltine itself killing many government soldiers and capturing dozens of heavy weaponry, including some armored vehicles.

There was no accurate casualty toll but the local UFDD commander claimed that they killed more than 100 Chadian soldiers, and lost 50 of their own fighters. On the other hand, the Chadian government did not give an immediate death toll but claimed that there forces were still in control of Biltine, despite rebel claims. Meanwhile, local residents both in Biltine and Abeche said that the local hospitals were flooded with dead and wounded soldiers. One aid worker recalled seeing tens of dead bodies of soldiers lying on the side of the street, baring a Chadian flag on their uniforms. Mahamat Nouri, head of the (Union for Democracy and Development) UFDD, said that the government casualty amounted to 300 killed in the three-hour-long battle.

Days later, government forces took back Abébé from UFDD rebels, and were closing in on rebel positions in Biltine. RADF rebels presumably left Biltine after the fall of Abébé, to government forces.
