= Dirmi Haroun =

Director-General of the General Directorate of the Security Services of State Institutions
- In office October 31, 2005 – October 28, 2012
- Preceded by: Position established
- Succeeded by: Saleh Touma

Personal details
- Children: Djamal Dirmi Haroun

Military service
- Rank: Lieutenant general
- Battles/wars: Chadian Civil War (2005–2010): Battle of N'Djamena (2006); Battle of Abou Goulem

Dirmi Haroun is a Chadian soldier and intelligence officer who served as the commander of the General Directorate of the Security Services of State Institutions (DGSSIE) from 2005 to 2012.

== Biography ==
Haroun is of Sudanese origin. In 2008, FIDH reported that Haroun, a divisional general at the time, commanded the DGSSIE, with General Toufa Abdoulaye as his second-in-command. He was the first commander of the DGSSIE since its creation in 2005. Haroun fought in the Chadian civil war between 2005 and 2010, and told FIDH that his unit held several opposing leaders, including former president Lol Mahamat Choua, Ibni Oumar Mahamat Saleh, and Ngarlejy Yorongar. Despite all three being prominent opposition politicians, Haroun lied and told FIDH that "no politician is being held at DGSSIE facilities."

Haroun was reported by rebels to be killed in action at the battle of Abou Goulem in 2007, alongside Col. Guende Abdramane. The Chadian government did not publicly announce his death, and he was still named to the position in 2008. In 2010, Haroun was on a list of Chadian officials possibly sanctionable by the International Criminal Court. In 2012, Haroun was no longer named head of the DGSSIE and replaced by Saleh Touma.

In 2023, Haroun was appointed to lieutenant general from major general alongside seven other commanders.

Haroun's son, Djamal Dirmi Haroun, was appointed director-general of customs in 2016. He was called "Mr. Toilette."
