= Battle of Abou Goulem =

Battle in Chad (2007)

- Part of the Chadian Civil War (2005–2010)
Date	November 26–27, 2007
Location	near Abou Goulem, Chad
Result	Chadian government victory

Belligerents
Chad	UFDD

Commanders and leaders
Unknown	Mahamat Nouri

Casualties and losses
200 killed (per UFDD); 160 injured	Several hundred killed (per government); 20 POWs; 50+ vehicles captured, 40+ vehicles destroyed

Between November 26 and 27, 2007, clashes broke out near Hadjer Hadid, Chad between the Chadian government and the Union of Forces for Democracy and Development (UFDD), a rebel group led by Mahamat Nouri. The rebels launched an offensive on government troops in Abou Goulem and Am Zoer, but were forced to retreat. The battle was one of the deadliest and most violent during the Chadian Civil War.

== Background ==
A month prior to the battle, four insurgent groups including the UFDD signed a ceasefire with the Chadian government. In that timeframe, French and European Union peacekeepers were set to deploy to enforce the ceasefire.

== Battle ==
A column of UFDD fighters entered Chadian territory from their bases in Sudan on November 24, intending to attack Chadian troops defending refugee camps in Abou Goulem and Am Zoer. UFDD commander Mahamat Nouri stated that he had received information that his troops would be under attack by the Chadian government. The rebels were intercepted near the town of Abou Goulem at about 9am on November 26, although no fighting took place in the town itself. The fighting was extremely fierce, and Chadian forces combined with a French jet destroyed the column. The Chadian government stated that their troops conducted combing operations in the area until nightfall.

Nouri admitted that his troops were forced to retreat, but maintained that the offensive was a success. UFDD troops retreated towards Sudan. Chadian troops reported that several hundred UFDD fighters were killed, and stated about 50 UFDD vehicles were seized and 40 vehicles were destroyed. The UFDD claimed that 200 Chadian troops were killed, and medical sources documented 160 wounded soldiers were evacuated to a hospital in Abéché. Reuters journalists on the scene said that in the days afterward, bodies of dead soldiers and fighters, burnt-out trucks, and projectiles were strewn across the battlefield. Chadian soldiers captured about twenty prisoners.
