= Battle of N'Djamena (2008) =

Battle during the 2005–2010 War in Chad

Coordinates: 12.4772°N 15.4397°E

- Part of the Chadian Civil War (2005–2010)
Date	February 2–4, 2008
Location	N'Djamena, Chad
Result	Government victory

Belligerents
UFDD rebels UFDD-F rebels RFC rebels	Chadian National Army; Justice and Equality Movement; France (but see below)

Commanders and leaders
Mahamat Nouri; Abdelwahid Aboud Mackaye; Timane Erdimi	Idriss Déby Itno; Daoud Soumain †

Strength
2,000 soldiers 250 technicals	2,000–3,000 soldiers 20 T-55 tanks 3 Mil Mi-24 helicopters many technicals

Casualties and losses
200–300 killed 135 captured	75 killed
- Civilian casualties: 160+ killed & 1,000+ wounded (Red Cross); At least 100 killed and 700 wounded (MSF); 400+ killed (President Déby) Total casualties: 540 killed (Uppsala Conflict Data Program); 700 killed, including those killed in Massaguet (President Déby)

The Battle of N'Djamena began on February 2, 2008, when Chadian rebel forces opposed to Chadian President Idriss Déby entered N'Djamena, the capital of Chad, after a three-day advance through the country. The rebels were initially successful, taking a large part of the city and attacking the heavily defended presidential palace. They did not capture the palace, and after two days of fighting they withdrew to outside the city. Around two days later they retreated east.

The assault on the capital was part of a longer military campaign to unseat the Chadian president. The array of rebels fighting against the government shifted during the war: this attack involved approximately 2,000 men from the Union of Forces for Democracy and Development, the Union of Forces for Democracy and Development-Fundamental and the Rally of Democratic Forces. Several non-rebel opposition leaders were arrested by the government.

Hundreds died in the battle, which displaced at least 30,000. French forces evacuated foreigners, but also provided intelligence and ammunition for the Chadian National Army and sporadically exchanged fire with rebels. Soldiers from the Justice and Equality Movement, a Darfur-based ally of the Chadian government, reportedly took part in the battle, but many more fought in the east of Chad, preventing rebel reinforcements from reaching the city.

== Background ==
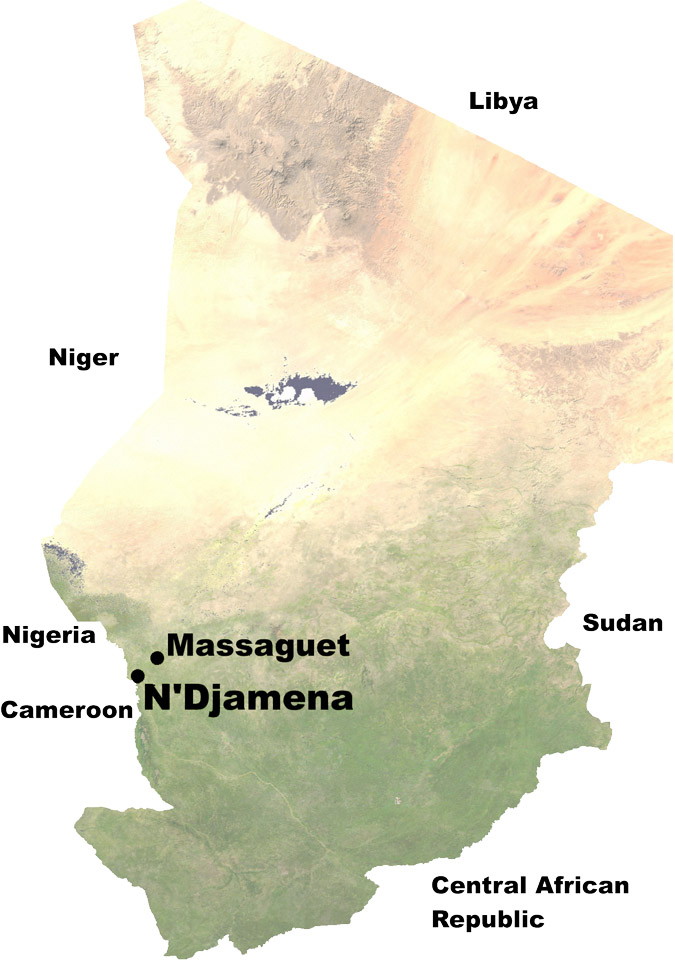
Locations of N'Djamena and Massaguet in Chad

In April 2006, soon after the beginning of the civil war in Chad, government forces repelled a rebel attack on the capital in which hundreds of people were killed; the rebels responsible for the attack, the United Front for Democratic Change (FUC) led by Mohammed Nour Abdelkerim, rallied to the government in December. Many FUC soldiers resisted integration into the Chadian National Army, and instead joined other rebel groups such as the newly emerged Union of Forces for Democracy and Development (UFDD), founded in October 2006, and led by Mahamat Nouri

In the summer and autumn of 2007 extensive peace talks were held in Tripoli through Libyan mediation among the Chadian government and the four main rebel groups, that is the UFDD, the Gathering of Forces for Change (RFC), the Union of Forces for Democracy and Development-Fundamental (UFDD-F) and the Chadian National Concord (CNT). Eventually the negotiations resulted in a peace agreement signed on October 25, 2007, in Sirte, in the presence of the President Idriss Déby, the Libyan leader Muammar Gaddafi and the Sudanese President Omar al-Bashir. As part of the deal, the rebels and the government agreed to an immediate ceasefire, a general amnesty and the right for the rebels to join the military and form political parties.

In November 2007 the peace agreement collapsed and war resumed. While the CNT rallied to the government, the other signatories at Sirte decided to counter Déby by reaching a major level of military integration. Thus on December 13, 2007, the UFDD, the UFDD-F and the RFC announced the creation a Unified Military Command with a collegial leadership. The UFDD could count at this moment on 2,000-3,000 men, while the allied RFC had around 800 troops and the UFDD-F 500 troops.

== Rebel advance toward N'Djamena ==
List of abbreviations used in this article

UFDD: Union of Forces for Democracy and Development
UFDD-F: Union of Forces for Democracy and Development-Fundamental
RFC: Rally of Democratic Forces
JEM: Justice and Equality Movement
MSF: Médecins Sans Frontières
OCHA: Office for the Coordination of Humanitarian Affairs
UN: United Nations

The rebels began their advance on N'Djamena from the eastern border with Sudan, more than 1,000 kilometres (600 mi) of desert terrain away from N'Djamena. They moved in a column of 250 to 300 vehicles, each capable of carrying between 10 and 15 men. On January 30, 2008, rebel forces captured Oum Hadjer, a town centrally located in the Batha region, about 400 km (250 mi) from the capital.

Soldiers from the Justice and Equality Movement, a Darfur rebel group, arrived in N'Djamena to reinforce the government side in late January, and army patrols in the city were increased in preparation for a rebel attack.

Amid increasing tensions, France sent a combat unit of 126 extra troops into Chad, joining 1,100 already stationed there. 54 Irish soldiers were to land in N'Djamena as a forward troop of the European Union force meant to protect the refugee camps in eastern Chad, but this flight was postponed as the rebel advanced toward the capital. 14 Austrian soldiers arrived in N'Djamena on January 31, 2008, as part of the same force and got trapped in the city.

The rebels clashed with government forces, led by President Déby personally, at Massaguet, 80 km (50 mi) northeast of N'Djamena on February 1. The fighting was described as very violent. During the battle the rebels were able to locate and focus fire on President Déby's armoured car. His army chief of staff, Daoud Soumain, was killed, lowering morale. The government forces retreated to the capital.

== Battle ==
=== February 2: Battle in the city ===
Smoke rising from the direction of the presidential palace

Chadian rebels were reported to have entered N'Djamena around 07:00 am on Saturday February 2, 2008, coming from Massaguet. The rebels then split into two columns. One was halted 3 km from the presidential palace, where government tanks fired at it. The other took control of the eastern parts of the city, and then swung towards the presidential palace, where it too was halted by tank fire. Eyewitnesses reported seeing rebel activity in the south and east of N'Djamena, with fighting later spreading to the area around the presidential palace. Smoke rose from the city, which shook from artillery. One resident of a western embassy told Reuters: "Rebels are headed for the palace and are about two blocks from here. The rebels are winning". The residence of the Saudi ambassador was hit by a bomb during the fighting, which led to the death of the wife and daughter of one of the embassy staff. Rebels in 15 vehicles drove past the Libya Hotel, which overlooks the parliament building, a few hours after the start of the battle. Fighting was reported to have died down by 12:45 pm, with the state radio station going off air around the same time.

Later a military source confirmed that the rebels had taken control of the outlying neighborhoods of the capital and a good part of the city center after intense fighting with government forces. Rebel command reported they had the presidential palace surrounded, with the president inside, and they were planning to attack the palace later in the evening. Government troops were surrounding the presidential palace and using heavy weapons against the rebels.

Just before dusk government troops made an attempt to push the rebels back in the east of the city and take back some territory in the city center. However, the gains made by the military were reported to be small. The fighting during the day was intense, and at one point French soldiers got involved when they exchanged fire with unknown gunmen while protecting one of the hotels that house hundreds of foreign nationals. Two French soldiers were slightly injured. In some parts of the city the rebels were greeted by cheering civilians.

On the same day, JANA, Libya's official news agency, reported that Libya's leader Muammar Gaddafi had persuaded Nouri to end the fighting. This was denied by a rebel spokesman.

=== February 3: Continued fighting and rebel withdrawal ===
Witnesses reported hearing anti-tank and automatic weapons fire coming from the city centre, at around 05:00 am. Reuters reported that the city was divided in two, with the rebels controlling the southwest. Running out of ammunition, government troops gave up the defense of the main radio station; after the rebels departed the scene, the building was looted and set on fire. Reports also say that a government helicopter that was chasing rebels hit the main market with a missile, setting off a round of looting that resulted in the market being torched.

Late on February 3, the rebels reported they had temporarily withdrawn from N'Djamena. The government said it pushed the rebels out of the city and the battle was over.

=== February 4: Rebels outside the city ===
Thousands of residents fled the city following the rebel withdrawal. The French assumed the rebels would attack again and continued to evacuate foreigners. Later in the day there were reports of renewed fighting as rebels returned to the city, but that was soon ended by a rebel declaration of cease-fire.

== Stalled reinforcements ==
During the battle, the Justice and Equality Movement (JEM), a Darfur rebel group, moved rapidly with a large column (100-200 vehicles, JEM has said) toward N'Djamena to fight at the government side; the RFC said they had pulled back from the city to face this threat. Sudan's official news agency stated that Chadian rebels had driven off government reinforcements moving toward the city from southern Chad. In the east of the country, the JEM fought to stop a force of 2,500 Chadian rebels that were on their way from Sudan to reinforce the troops outside N'Djamena. The Sudanese Air Force supported the Chadian rebels as they fought JEM forces near Adré on February 4. The Chadian rebels were narrowly defeated. Media favouring UFDD reported that an RFC column supposed to reinforce the rebel forces at N'Djamena was withdrawn by Timane Erdimi's orders following a leadership dispute with UFDD's leader Mahamat Nouri.

== Aftermath ==
Rebel spokesman Abderaman Koulamallah said that "the suffering of the Chadian people" had led them to agree to a cease-fire and that they had done so "in line with the peace initiatives of fraternal countries Libya and Burkina Faso". He also called for "a non-exclusive national dialogue with a view to a peaceful resolution of the Chadian conflict". Prime Minister Delwa Kassire Koumakoye, claiming victory, was dismissive of the rebel declaration of cease-fire, saying that the government had no one to sign a cease-fire with because the rebels "don't exist anymore ... We've got them under control."

The rebels remained at the fringe of the city on February 5, claiming they could easily take the city if the French soldiers were not present. There was still sporadic shooting outside the city, but N'Djamena was calm. Chadian attack helicopters were bombing rebel positions outside the city on February 6. The government said it would chase the rebels who withdrew on 200 technicals. There was still widespread looting in N'Djamena.

On February 6, Déby, who was in military uniform, spoke at a press conference for the first time since the battle began, after meeting with Hervé Morin, the French Minister of Defense. Déby said his forces had defeated the rebels, whom he described as "mercenaries directed by Sudan", and that his forces were in "total control" of the city as well as the whole country. Reacting to reports that he had been wounded, he gestured and declared: "Look at me, I'm fine". He said, however, that he did not know the whereabouts of more than three-fourths of the members of his government, and he warned that the issue of "traitors" would be dealt with "when the time comes". Morin suggested that the rebels were not completely routed but were waiting for reinforcements. The Sudanese authorities promptly denied President Déby's accusations of Sudanese involvement. Intelligence forces chief Salah Gosh declared on February 7 that Sudan had "called for the evacuation of the opposition from N'Djamena and the opposition agreed" and "joined efforts with the Libyans on reaching a ceasefire." When Sudanese media aired reports claiming government participation in the attack, the government responded by reimposing a daily censorship on the press from March 6.

Koumakoye announced the imposition of a dusk-to-dawn curfew on February 7 for parts of the country, including N'Djamena, while Déby called for the European Union to send a peacekeeping force to Chad. Meanwhile, the rebels said they were regrouping in Mongo, 400 kilometres to the east of N'Djamena. French and Chadian officials concluded that the rebels had been routed from N'Djamena and would not attack the city again. The European Union resumed the deployment of troops on February 12, 2008. A month after the battle the government started digging a 3-metre deep trench around the city, with a few fortified gateways, to hinder future assaults on N'Djamena. A court in N'Djamena tried a number of rebel leaders in absentia for their role in the attack on N'Djamena, and passed death sentence in absentia in August 2008 on 12 men, including the former Chadian President Hissène Habré and the warlords Timane Erdimi and Mahamat Nouri.

== Casualties and refugees ==
No confirmed numbers of dead were reported, but people on the ground reported bodies lying in the city streets. Aid agency MSF said on February 3 there were "a lot of dead bodies" in the city, and that 300 people were being treated in hospitals. After the battle, MSF said that hospitals had counted 100 killed civilians and nearly 700 wounded. Red Cross officials spoke on February 5 of "hundreds" of civilians killed in the fighting, and over a thousand wounded. They later said over 160 civilians had been killed. Avenue Mobutu, a main thoroughfare, and other streets, were strewn with military and civilian victims and the charred remains of tanks and pick-up trucks using in the fighting. On March 6, President Déby gave an estimate of 700 killed in the city, most of them civilians. Most humanitarian staff were evacuated from Chad, and at least 30,000 refugees migrated to Cameroon according to the UN official Sophie de Caen.

== Arrests of opposition leaders ==
Government soldiers reportedly arrested opposition leaders Lol Mahamat Choua, Ibni Oumar Mahamat Saleh and Ngarlejy Yorongar on February 3. They were also said to have attempted to arrest Saleh Kebzabo, but he was not present at his home.

The government denied the reported arrests of the opposition leaders, saying that they had gone missing in rebel-controlled parts of the city, but it later acknowledged that Choua was being held with prisoners of war, and the French ambassador was allowed to visit him in a military prison. He was freed from prison before March. Eventually, Yorongar also reemerged: he was found in Cameroon on March 2. He reached France on March 6, and claimed to have fled from Chadian security forces that had captured him. He added that he had seen Ibni Oumar Mahamat Saleh being punched and kicked by the same forces, perhaps to death.

The crackdown by the security forces, according to Human Rights Watch, involved other individuals, and was legalized with the proclamation of a state of emergency on February 14, conceding sweeping powers to security forces to arrest and detain people without charge. By March 15, 2008, when the state of emergency expired, 15 Chadians had been arrested. Human Rights Watch suspects the actual number is higher. Of those arrested, 11 are from the Gorane ethnic group, the same of Mahamat Nouri, the main insurgent commander, which has raised fears that the government is arresting people at least in part for their ethnicity. Human rights campaigners said that many Goranes were fleeing from the capital.

The European Union expressed "deep concern" over the arrests, and EU Development Commissioner Louis Michel called for the "immediate release" of the opposition leaders.

== French involvement ==
French soldiers guarding a hotel with an M2 machine gun

At the beginning of the 2008 battle, French soldiers evacuated hundreds of French citizens and other foreigners to Libreville in Gabon, while hundreds more came under French military protection at five assembly points in N'Djamena. This included 103 UN aid workers, from 150 that have left in total. According to the French military, they had evacuated 580 foreign nationals by February 3, leaving 320 to be airlifted on February 4. In total, nearly 1,300 foreigners were evacuated by France during the battle. France also volunteered to evacuate President Déby on February 3, but that offer was rejected.

There was a brief exchange of fire on February 2 between rebels and French soldiers guarding the international airport, which was used by the French to evacuate people, but also housed four Chadian army helicopters. French Mirage F1 fighters conducted reconnaissance flights over rebel positions, but by February 3 all six aircraft operating from N'Djamena were moved to Libreville for safety. On February 4 two Mirage fighters returned and continued reconnaissance flights. Rebels accused these planes of opening fire, but those reports were unconfirmed. France denied taking part in combat during the battle.

In a declaration on February 4, the United Nations Security Council called on all member-states to back the Chadian government. This was interpreted as support for French intervention. The pronouncement was not as strong as France had wanted. The rebels saw the declaration as abuse by France of the UN's potential role in negotiations. On February 5 President Sarkozy said that the French would be ready to intervene militarily if need be. France had provided the Chadian government medical and logistic support and intelligence during the battle. The French newspaper La Croix cited French diplomats and servicemen on February 7, who reported that French officers had coordinated a Chadian attack on a rebel column in Massaguet on February 1, provided information on rebel movements, delivered munitions through Libya, and sent special forces to fight rebels in the capital. The use of special forces was strongly denied by French Foreign Minister Bernard Kouchner the following day.
