= Battle of N'Djamena =

Battle of N'Djamena may refer to:

- Battle of N'Djamena (1979)
- Battle of N'Djamena (1980)
- Battle of N'Djamena (2006)
- Battle of N'Djamena (2008)
