= Union of Forces for Change and Democracy =

Rebel group in Chad

- Union des forces pour le changement et la démocratie
- Founder: Adouma Hassaballah Jedareb
- Founded: March 2008
- Split from: UFDD
- Size: 2,000 combatants

Union of Forces for Change and Democracy (French: Union des forces pour le changement et la démocratie, UFCD) is a Chadian rebel group which split from the UFDD in March 2008.

The group was founded by Adouma Hassaballah Jedareb who wanted a greater autonomy from Mahamat Nouri, leader of UFDD. Adouma was member of FRPN, later FUC. After FUC's unsuccessful attack on N'Djamena, he took numerous Ouaddaïan combatants from FUC and led them to join UFDD. In April 2008 the group had around 2000 militants.
