= Abdelwahid Aboud Mackaye =

Chadian insurgent leader (born 1953)

Personal details
- Born: 1953 (age 72–73)
- Party: CDR; FIDEL
- Other political affiliations: FUC; UFDD (until 2007); UFDD-F

Abdelwahid Aboud Mackaye (born 1953) is a Chadian insurgent leader involved in the war to topple the Chadian President Idriss Déby. Originally a fighter in the Democratic Revolutionary Council (CDR) militia during the first Chadian Civil War, under Déby he became a civil servant before defecting to the rebels in 2003. After having been for a time first in the FUC and later in the UFDD, he has founded in 2007 the UFDD-Fundamental, which has participated in February 2008 to the unsuccessful attack on N'Djamena.

A Missiria Arab, Abdelwahid was born in 1953 near to Oum Hadjer in Batha. He fought as a CDR militant in 1980 in the second battle of N'Djamena which saw confronted the President Goukouni Oueddei and his Defence Minister Hissène Habré; during the confrontation Abdelwahid was wounded, and since then he has always limped. Successively he became a civil servant, and occupying under the government of Idriss Déby the office of subprefect.

In 2003 Abdelwahid broke with Déby and passed in open rebellion. He became secretary-general of the Chadian rebel group Forces for the Instauration of Democracy and Freedom (FIDEL), and, after the group's union with other organizations, one of the leaders of the newly formed United Front for Democratic Change (FUC) rebel alliance, founded in December 2005 and under the presidency of Mahamat Nour Abdelkerim.

On January 19, 2006, Abdelwahid was arrested, along with nineteen other rebels, after participating in an interview to Radio France Internationale in the Sudanese capital of Khartoum, in which he stated that "FUC's relations with the Sudanese government are friendly - very close", and argued that this was in line with the tradition under which successive Chadian rebellions had seized power with some degree of support from Khartoum. The Sudanese government repeatedly denied the accusation of Chadian President Idriss Déby that the Sudanese government was providing financial and material support to the FUC. He was released from jail shortly after. His arrest was denounced by the Dakar-based human rights organization Rencontre africaine pour la défense des droits de l'homme (RADDHO)

Abdelwahid organized in April together with Nour the attack on the capital, which ended in a defeat for the rebels. During those days Déby arrested for fear of collusion with the rebels the general Ahmat Fadoul Makaye, the Chadian army's Deputy Chief of Staff and cousin of Abdelwahid. He was cleared of all suspicions and freed three days later. The latter was removed on September 26 with Issa Moussa Tamboulé from the FUC's political bureau; he was allegedly suspected of secretly plotting with the Déby government. Around the same time Abdelwahid, who represented an Arab faction increasingly hostile to Nour since his failed attack, using his position of secretary-general destituted Nour.

Following this, Abdelwahid with a group of FUC dissidents united with Acheikh ibn Oumar's Democratic Revolutionary Council (CDR) and Mahamat Nouri's Union of Forces for Progress and Democracy (UFPD) to found on October 22 the Union of Forces for Democracy and Development (UFDD).

In April 2007, a major crisis shook the UFDD, when the Vice-President Acheikh ibn Oumar demanded Nouri a major role to his men in movement's apparatus. Nouri refused and expelled Acheikh and consolidated the control of his ethnic group, the Gorane, over the UFDD

After Acheikh, also Abdelwahid, anxious to retake his freedom of movement from Nouri, left the UFDD and founded in May with Acheikh a new armed group, the Union of Forces for Democracy and Development-Fundamental (UFDD-F), an Arab-dominated group estimated to count on about 500 militants.

Abdelwahid took part to the peace talks held through Libyan mediation in Tripoli between the Chadian government and the leaders of four rebel movements, the UFDD with Nouri, the Rassemblement des Forces pour le Changement (RFC) with Timane Erdimi, The Chadian National Concord with Hassan Saleh al-Djinedi and the UFDD-F. At the beginning of the talks on June 23, Abdelwahid stated that the "problem is mostly of a constitutional order", adding that they "demand a revision of the constitution to reopen the road to transition". An important stage in the talks was reached on October 3 when the government and the four rebel groups signed an accord in Tripoli on power-sharing in the government and the integration of the rebel forces in the Chadian army. Among the rebel leaders, Abdelwahid was the only one to call the paper signed a "definitive accord", while the others only considered it provisional. Due to the latters objection the four rebel leaders signed on October 25 a new accord in Surt, presumed to be definitive, under which the armed movements would disarm in November and become political parties.

The accord was broken already on November 26, giving way to violent fighting between the rebels and the government. In December, due to Sudanese pressures, reapproached himself to Nouri and Erdimi, forming with them in mid-December a Unified Military Command with Abderahman Koulamallah as spokesman. Abdelwahit claimed that after his bases within Sudan were attacked twice by the Chad Air Force, first on December 28 and later on January 6, 2008.

By the end of January, the three rebels leaders put on the ground 3,000 men for an attack on the capital to deal onca and for all with Déby. The forces reach the capital, but are defeated after a battle that leaves 160 dead on the ground, forcing the rebels to retreat.
