= Second Chadian Civil War =

Second Chadian Civil War may refer to:

- Chadian–Libyan War, which included a Chadian civil war
- Chadian Civil War (2005–2010)
