= Fongoro =

Fongoro may refer to:

- Fongoro people, an ethnic group of Sudan and Chad
- Fongoro language, a minor Central Sudanic language of Chad and formerly of Sudan

== See also ==
- Georges Fonghoro (1958–2016), Malian Roman Catholic prelate, bishop of Mopti
