= Battle of Am Dam =

Battle during the Chadian Civil War (2005-2010)

- Part of the Chadian Civil War (2005–2010)
Date	May 7, 2009
Location	Am Dam, Chad 12.266667°N 20.81667°E
Result	Chadian victory

Belligerents
Union of Forces for the Resistance (UFR)	Chad

Commanders and leaders
Timan Erdimi; Hamouda Beki (POW)	(Chad) Idriss Déby Itno (Chad) Mahamat Déby Itno (Chad) Bakhit Ahmat Djouma (POW)

Casualties and losses
226 killed 67 captured	22 killed 112 captured
- Location of Am Dam

The Battle of Am Dam took place in and around the eastern Chadian town of Am Dam on May 7 and May 8, 2009 when Chadian Army forces attacked a column of advancing Union of Forces for the Resistance (UFR) rebels.

== Battle ==
At 11:30 on the morning of May 7, 2009, a Presidential Guard battalion led by General Toufa Abdoulaye ambushed a column of UFR rebels on the eastern outskirts of Am Dam, a village 100 kilometers south of Abéché in southeastern Chad. Mounted infantry from both sides exchanged fire from the backs of Toyota “technicals” mounted with heavy weapons. One eyewitness saw anti-aircraft weapons used against targets on the ground. Am Dam’s hospital sustained severe damage when a government vehicle offloading casualties drew fire from rebels forces, which also destroyed 14 civilian structures in the vicinity with errant shells. According to hospital workers, government soldiers returned fire and promptly withdrew.

Less than an hour after the skirmish began, rebel vehicles that were passing to the south of Am Dam in an attempt to flank the smaller government force encountered an armored column of government reinforcements led by Hassan al Gadam al-Djineddi, chief of staff of the Chadian National Army, and General Tahir Ardah, general director of the Gendarmerie Nationale. The rebel flanking movement was eliminated, and by 2:30 the remnants of the UFR column was racing back to safe havens in Darfur, with government forces in hot pursuit.

Official tallies later released by the government testified to the intensity of the fighting, with 247 combatants killed, 225 of them rebels. Of the 212 rebels taken into custody, 83 were minors.

With government control firmly established, soldiers broke into the hospital pharmacy and commandeered medical supplies. Civilian volunteers in Am Dam and the adjacent village of Am Dam Zeribe were organized into six teams of volunteers to collect and bury the dead. One burial committee encountered 11 rebel corpses, seven of whom had an entry wound in the forehead or between the eyes. One government soldier was found with his eyes gouged out.

Government soldiers conducting security sweeps in Am Dam and surrounding villages for wounded rebels pursued a group of insurgents to the village of Galbassa, two kilometers east of Am Dam, where four rebels took refuge in a home that was occupied by six civilians. Government soldiers supported by a T-55 tank drew within five meters of the structure and ordered the civilians to leave. Five civilians emerged, with two rebels in their midst. Both rebels were killed by government soldiers and three of the five civilians suffered gunshot wounds, including a 14-year-old boy. The structure from which they had emerged was then deliberately flattened, killing the two remaining rebels and crushing to death Youssouf Abakar, a 55-year-old civilian and the father of eight children. Abakar was one of 15 civilians killed during the combat.

Government soldiers remained in the Am Dam area for six days, during which the nearby hamlet of Mashangala was systematically looted of its valuables. In the early evening of May 7, government soldiers entered Galbassa under the pretense of searching for rebels and sexually assaulted two sisters, a 19-year-old woman and a 14-year-old girl. The women of Galbassa evacuated the village the following morning, going to the nearby towns of Gasdjamoudes and Habanier. They did not return until government forces withdrew from the area.

== Control of Tissi ==
In May 2009, simultaneous with the UFR raid on Am Dam, the Front Populaire pour la Renaissance Nationale (FPRN), a Chadian rebel group led by Adoumj Yacoub, occupied the strategic town of Tissi at the tri-point of Chad, Sudan, and the Central African Republic. Chadian government forces wouldn't retake the city until April 2010.
