= Mediation of the Chadian Civil War (2005–2010) =

Historical conflict resolution process

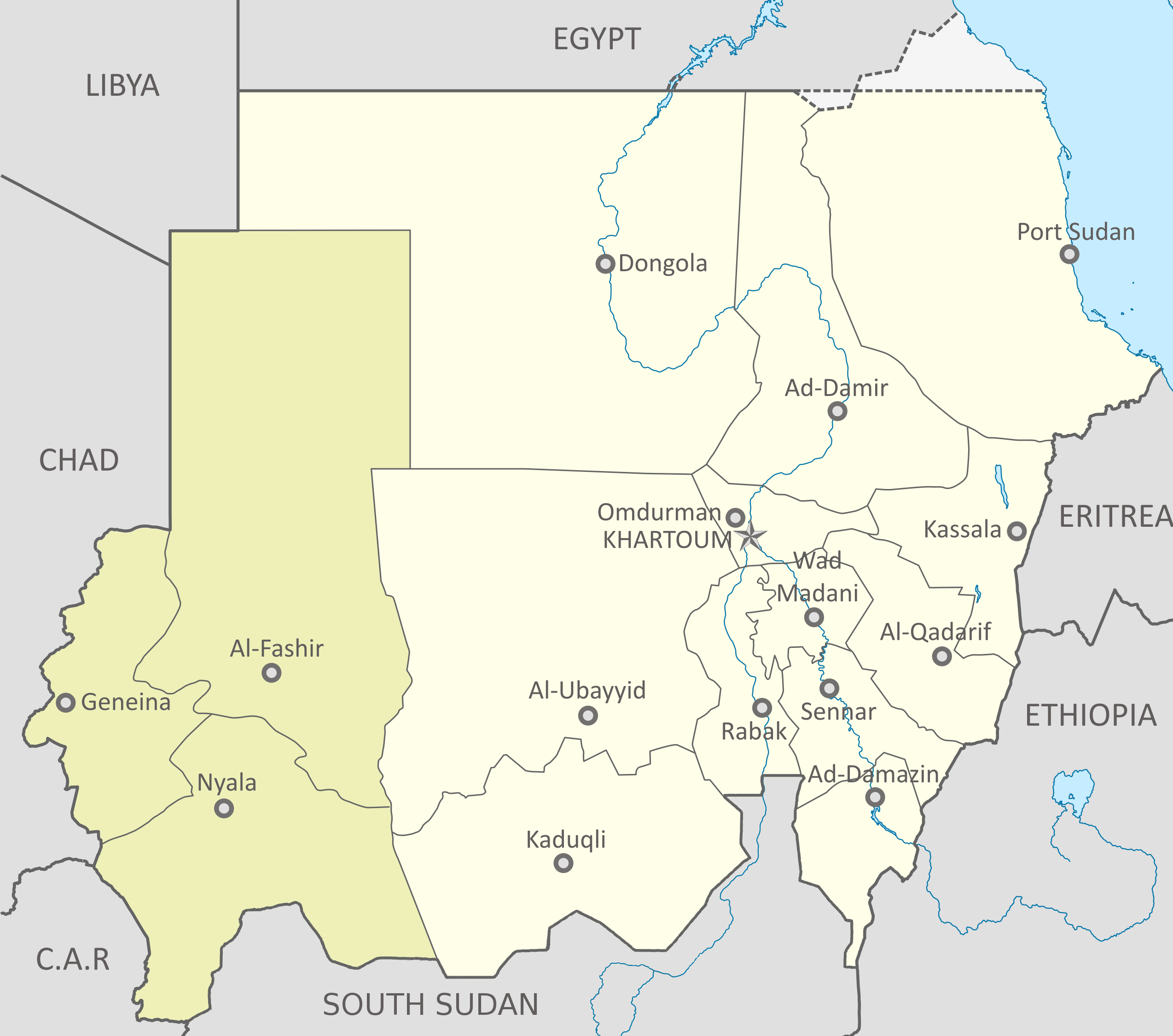
Map of Sudan with the Darfur region highlighted.

Mediation of the Chadian-Sudanese conflict began shortly after the government of Chad declared an "état de belligérance", or 'state of belligerency' with Sudan. on December 23, 2005. The BBC translated "belligérance" as "war".

The Chadian government called for the citizens of Chad to mobilize themselves against the "common enemy", referring to militant members of the Rally for Democracy and Liberty and Platform for Change, Unity and Democracy (SCUD) rebel groups — Chadian rebels, allegedly backed by the Sudanese government — and Sudanese Janjaweed militiamen who have crossed over from Sudan while pursuing Fur refugees. The RDL denied they were receiving support from the Sudanese government. Between December 26 and December 28 RDL and SCUD joined with six other rebel groups to form the United Front for Democratic Change rebel alliance, led by Mohammed Nour.

== Sudan ==
"We are very surprised by this. All the channels of communications are open between our two countries. We don't know why they are moving out of the bilateral relations to make these ... threatening statements. We will not let anyone use Sudanese soil to launch attacks against a neighbouring country," said Sudanese State Minister of Foreign Affairs Al-Samani Wasiylah.

Sudan has suggested that the two countries use joint border patrols, just as they previously did in 2003 to prevent attacks from Chad by Fur rebel groups into Sudan, to prevent future attacks, but Chad has thus far refused. Déby accuses Sudan of stationing 50 armored vehicles in the Sudanese town of Geneina near the Chad-Sudan border to launch further attacks into Chad.

On January 19, Sudanese authorities arrested Abdelwahit About, the former head of FIDEL and current commander within FUC, along with 19-20 other rebels depending on reports, after About gave an interview on Sudanese radio stating that he was in Khartoum and that FUC has friendly ties with the Sudanese government.

"I think he was arrested because he had given an interview with a journalist and they discovered he was in Khartoum," RDL spokesman Abdel Karim said. Karim also stated that FUC requests a meeting with the AU. The AU did not comment.

== African Union ==
The AU has sent delegates to both nations. The delegation to Sudan is headed by Baba Gana Kingibe. The Chadian Foreign Ministry told the Sudanese ambassador to Chad to "cease all aggression against Chad." On December 30 Nigerian President and then African Union chairman Olusegun Obasanjo suggested a five-way, one-day summit grouping the leaders of Egypt, Libya, Chad, Sudan and Nigeria to solve the conflict and Egypt proposed the location and date of the summit as Tripoli on January 4, 2006, but this summit has been postponed. The meeting would have discussed the AU committee report on the differences between Chad's account of the attack on Adré and Sudan's.

== United Nations ==
The United Nations Security Council issued a statement condemning the attacks on Adré and supporting the mediation of the African Union, "It [United Nations Security Council] firmly condemned, in that context, recent attacks perpetrated by armed elements within Chad and, in particular, the attack on 19 December on positions of the Chadian national army in the town of Adré, and supported efforts to reduce tensions on the border... The Security Council also appeals to donors to continue both supporting the crucial work of AMIS in stemming the violence in this suffering region and providing critical humanitarian assistance to millions of war-afflicted civilians in Darfur and across the border in Chad.".

Keith McKenzie, UNICEF's special representative to Darfur, told reporters that "Darfur is complicated enough without the Chadians getting involved."

Almost 200 United Nations aid workers left two humanitarian bases in Guereda in eastern Chad on 2006-01-22, after a meeting between UN officials and local government officials who were being briefed on the status of the 200,000 Sudanese refugees in Chad was forcibly ended by up to 100 armed men of unknown, but most likely Janjaweed, affiliation. Five Chadian government officials including the top government official of Guereda and the head of the local branch of the military police were kidnapped, jeeps belonging to two aid groups were stolen, and five local residents suffered gunshot wounds. One of the jeeps was later seen crossing into Sudan.

Chadian government spokesman Doumgor told reporters on January 23 that Chadian authorities did not know who was behind the latest attack, and that kidnappers have made no demands for ransom.

"We've had no contact from them at the moment, but the Chadian army is fanning out in the area to try and find them."

There will be a 20% reduction in humanitarian staff in eastern Chad with 90 UN and other aid agencies workers evacuated from Guereda and 80 workers from Iriba to regional headquarters in Abeche.

Claire Bourgeois, UNHCR deputy representative in Chad, said, "The situation is serious enough at this stage, especially when taking into account the number of security incidents in the past days... This measure is temporary. We have kept enough staff in field offices to continue delivering services to the refugees living around Guereda and Iriba. Two NGO vehicles were reported stolen in the past four days and other partners have also been victims of robbery."

== Organisation of the Islamic Conference ==
On December 25, the Secretary General of the Organisation of the Islamic Conference, Ekmeleddin Ihsanoglu, called for an end to hostilities between the two nations and announced support for the African Union's attempt to mediate.

== Egypt ==
On December 26, Egyptian Foreign Minister Ahmed Aboul Gheit began an attempt to mediate the dispute between the two countries by speaking to Ahmad Allam-Mi and to the foreign minister of Sudan, Lam Akol. In an interview with Radio Cairo, Minister Gheit said that "Egypt is holding contacts with the United Nations in this respect as well to reach coordination with some of the regional parties and to contain the situation."

== United States ==
Chadian Minister Allami met with US Deputy Secretary of State Robert Zoellick on January 10. United States State Department spokesman Justin Higgins stated, "The deputy secretary underscored that the situation is very dangerous and expressed concern about displaced persons on both sides of the border. He [Zoellick] noted that the conflict between the parties runs the risk of endangering civilians, refugees, and internally displaced persons."

An anonymous State Department official said Zoellick was "firm and clear that Chad needed to work with Sudan to resolve this."
