= Union of Resistance Forces =

- Union des forces de la résistance
- Leader: Timane Erdimi
- Founded: 2009
- Country: Chad
- Status: active
- Size: 500 (c. 2019)

The Union of Resistance Forces (French: Union des forces de la résistance, Arabic: إتحاد قوات المقاومة; abbreviated UFR) is an alliance of Chadian rebel groups.

== Origins ==
The UFR was founded in mid-January 2009 as an alliance of eight separate rebel groups:

- the Rally of Forces for Change (RFC)
- the Union of Forces for Change and Democracy (UFCD)
- the Union of Forces for Democracy and Development (UFDD)
- the Union of Forces for Democracy and Development–Fundamental (UFDD-F)
- the Democratic Revolutionary Council (CDR)
- the Popular Front for National Rebirth (FPRN)
- the Democratic Union for Change (UDC)
- the Front for the Salvation of the Republic (FSR)

== History ==
The UFR was established near the end of the Chadian Civil War (2005–2010) by rebel groups opposed to the government of President Idriss Déby. Timane Erdimi, nephew of Déby and leader of the RFC, was appointed the head of the alliance. UFR forces suffered severe losses to the Chadian Army at the Battle of Am Dam in May 2009 and the Battle of Tamassi in April 2010. The severe casualties suffered by the UFR, along with peace agreements signed between Chad and Sudan, led the alliance to splinter and disperse. It began to reconstitute itself in neighboring Libya in 2013.

The UFR reportedly took part in the June 2018 Gulf of Sidra Offensive against the Libyan National Army (LNA), attempting to capture the towns of Ras Lanuf and Sidra alongside the Benghazi Defense Brigades. An LNA offensive against rebel groups based in Libya's south led the UFR to re-enter Chad in January 2019. Between February 3 and February 6, 2019, the French Air Force initiated a bombing campaign against UFR targets in the Ennedi Plateau region as part of Operation Barkhane. On 9 February, 2019 the Chadian army claimed to have captured 250 UFR rebels, including four leaders, and destroyed forty vehicles.

In February 2022, the Transitional Military Council of Chad alleged that the UFR was trying to enlist the Wagner Group to aid them in the ongoing Insurgency in Northern Chad, accusing Timane Erdimi of using an advisor to Central African President Faustin-Archange Touadéra as a middleman to negotiate support.
