= Sila Department =

Coordinates: 12°13′25″N 21°24′52″E

Sila (Arabic: سيلا) or Dar Sila (Arabic: دار سيلا) was formerly a department in the Ouaddaï region of Chad.

In 2008 it became part of the new Sila Region which was created from the Ouaddaï region's former Sila and Djourf Al Ahmar (Djourouf Al Ahmar) departments.

The capital of the former department and new region of Sila is Goz Beïda.

== See also ==
- Dar Sila
