= Battle of Tamassi =

2010 battle of the 2005–10 Chadian Civil War

- Part of the Chadian Civil War (2005–2010)
Date	24–28 April 2010
Location	Tamassi, Chad
Result	Chadian government victory

Belligerents
Chad	UFR (Union of Resistance Forces); FPRN (Popular Front for National Renaissance)

Commanders and leaders
Idriss Déby Itno; Brahim Mahamat Seid †; Abdoulaye Touffa	Adoum Yacoub Kougou; Brahim Irig

Casualties and losses
10 killed 24 injured	33–208 killed ~70 injured 62 captured

The Battle of Tamassi took place around the village of Tamassi in Eastern Chad during the Chadian Civil War. This was the last major military engagement fought during the war until a peace deal was reached later that year.

Two separate actions took place on 24 and 28 April between Adoum Yacoub Kougou's FPRN (Popular Front for National Renaissance) and government forces. The government stated that it had killed 100 FPRN members and captured 80 wounded fighters for the loss of 9 soldiers killed.

== Battle ==
On 24 April, after several government-led offensives against rebel occupied border towns, reconnaissance missions and reports to the armed forces of the presence of several hundred heavily armed rebels regrouping in the village of Tamassi, in the vicinity of Sudan for a decisive counter-attack against government troops. Out of fear for a renewed offensive against the capital of N'Djamena, several battalions of infantry supported by dozens of armored personnel carriers and heavy artillery under the command of Brahim Mahamat Seid surrounded and closed in on Tamassi essentially allowing no alternative for escape to Sudan.

The initial assault on the town itself took place around midday after artillery bombardment of the rebels defensive line broke through. The column of troops entered Tamassi from both sides. Rebels took cover in the township building and a retired army base from artillery barrage which proved to be the most resistant. Rebel technicals equipped with anti-tank and artillery lined the streets to prevent a breakthrough per defense. The first encounter took place at the township building, a large two-story compound. Close to 90 rebel fighters prevented any government assault by using RPGs and heavy weaponry.

In a desperate attempt to take the building government troops broke off into groups, one coming from the rear while the other came from the back. While this was going on armored vehicles came in from the front penetrating the buildings' defense. However, a carrier was blown up killing its crew of three. The attack from the rear was repulsed, killing two soldiers from machine-gun fire. From behind troops were pushed back. Government then lines regrouped and offered an ultimatum to the rebel defenders in less than two hours or suffer consistent attacks. A truce was reached and the rebels' 62 remaining defenders were captured, while 22 were killed earlier.
