= Anakaza tribe =

The Anakaza are name clan of Toubou people branch Daza . One of the largest of Daza subgroups, they are a nomadic people traditionally employed in camel-herding. They are mostly located in the Saharan region of Borkou in northern Chad, they can be found in a vast area from Faya-Largeau to Kirdimi and nomadizing an area which goes from Oum Chalouba to the Djourab and Mortcha.

In modern times out of its ranks was born Hissène Habré, president of Chad between 1982 and 1990, who during his tenure in office gave the key positions to his fellow Daza, favouring among the latters his subgroup. The Anakaza also formed the bulk of his élite unit, the Presidential Guard.

Another prominent Anakaza is the current rebel leader Mahamat Nouri. Due to his rebellion in 2006 against the Chadian President Idriss Déby, the government began exploiting the long-standing rivalities among the Anakaza and another Daza subgroup, the Kamaya, The Kamaya subgroup of Daza Goran is divided into approximately 31 clans and can be found throughout the Borkou region, specifically in Kirdimi, N'Gorma, Yin, Degiure, other areas in Borkou Yalla, and Faya-Largeau. There are two other Daza subgroups of Goran tribes that share these lands: the Donza and the Kokorda, which is the Kokorda sharing only the Kirdimi village. .
