= Djourf Al Ahmar Department =

Coordinates: 12°45′50″N 20°27′58″E

Djourf Al Ahmar or Djourouf Al Ahmar (Arabic: مقاطعة جرف الأحمر) is one of two departments in Sila, a region of Chad. Its capital is Am Dam.

Djourf Al Ahmar was formerly one of four departments in the Ouaddaï region of Chad. In 2008 the Sila region was created from the Ouaddaï region's former departments of Sila and Djourf Al Ahmar.

== Sub-prefectures ==
The department of Borkou is divided into three sub-prefectures:

- Am Dam
- Magrane
- Haouich

== See also ==
- Departments of Chad
