= Mahamat Nouri =

Chadian insurgent leader

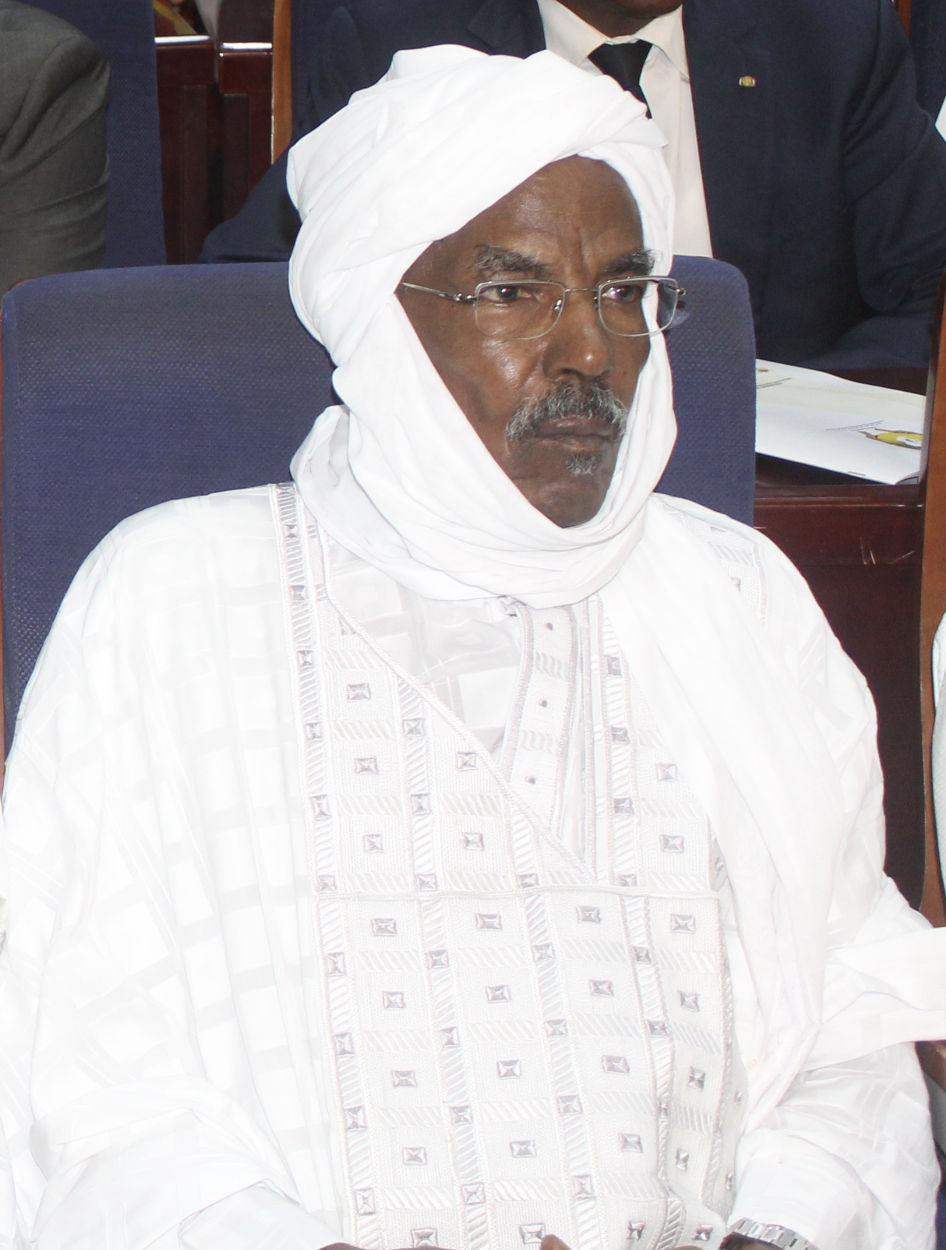

Ambassador to Saudi Arabia
- In office 2004 – May 6, 2006
- President: Idriss Déby

Minister for National Defence
- In office February 25, 2001 – February 2, 2004
- President: Idriss Déby
- Prime Minister: Nagoum Yamassoum; Haroun Kabadi; Moussa Faki

Minister for Livestock
- In office August 12, 1996 – February 25, 2001
- President: Idriss Déby
- Prime Minister: Koibla Djimasta; Nassour Guelendouksia Ouaido; Nagoum Yamassoum

Minister for Interior
- In office April 16, 1995 – August 12, 1996
- President: Idriss Déby
- Prime Minister: Koibla Djimasta

Minister for Health
- In office April 7, 1993 – November 6, 1993
- President: Idriss Déby
- Prime Minister: Fidèle Moungar

Minister for Transport
- In office March 23, 1979 – April 29, 1979
- President: Goukouni Oueddei

Minister for Interior
- In office August 29, 1978 – March 23, 1979
- President: Félix Malloum
- Prime Minister: Hissène Habré

Personal details
- Born: 1947 (age 78–79) Faya-Largeau, French Equatorial Africa (present-day Chad)
- Party: Union of Forces for Democracy and Development

General Mahamat Nouri (born 1947) is a Chadian insurgent leader who currently commands the Union of Forces for Democracy and Development (UFDD). A Muslim from northern Chad, he began his career as a FROLINAT rebel, and when the group's Second Army split in 1976 he sided with his kinsman Hissène Habré. As Habré's associate he obtained in 1978 the first of the many ministerial positions in his career, becoming Interior Minister in a coalition government. When Habré reached the presidency in 1982, Nouri was by his side and played an important role in the regime.

Following Habré's downfall in 1990, Nouri passed his allegiance to his successor, Idriss Déby, under whom he rose once again to great prominence, remaining in the cabinet without interruption from 1995 to 2004. After that he was sent as Chad's ambassador to Saudi Arabia: while in that country he broke with Déby in 2006, joining armed opposition against him.

Nouri led the creation, from a plurality of armed movements, the most powerful of the Chadian rebel groups, the Union of Forces for Democracy and Development (UFDD). He started a series of attacks against government positions in eastern Chad in autumn 2006, causing serious difficulties to Déby. After the ultimate failure of a series of talks held in Libya in 2007, Nouri coalesced with two other rebel groups and launched a direct attack on the Chadian capital in February 2008, but was repelled after days of heavy fighting.

On 17 June 2019 he was arrested by the French police, as were Abakar Tollimi and Abderaman Abdelkerim (brother of Mahamat Nour Abdelkerim), on suspicion of crimes against humanity in which he was implicated between 2005 and 2010 in Chad and Sudan. following a procedure opened in 2017.

== Nouri and Hissène Habré ==
An ethnic Daza clan of the Anakaza subclan like the former President Hissène Habré, Nouri was born in 1947 in Faya-Largeau in northern Chad.

Nouri received a formal education and became a postal official. He successively entered in the ranks of the FROLINAT, the rebel movement that was waging a civil war against the central government. When the Second Army of the FROLINAT divided itself in 1977 among the supporters of Habré and those of Goukouni Oueddei, Nouri sided with Habré and was one of the very few men to be by Habré's side for the entire length of the latter's political career. As number 2 of Habré's rebel Armed Forces of the North (FAN) with the rank of inspector-general, he was given the leadership of the FAN delegation that negotiated the Khartoum peace accord with the Chadian government in 1978. During the coalition government created from this accord between President Félix Malloum and the former rebel leader Habré, now nominated Prime Minister, Nouri held the decisive post of Minister of the Interior, although he was well known for his low opinion of Southern Chadians. After the collapse of the coalition in February 1979, Nouri became Minister of Transport in the first Goukouni government that followed.

When Habré rebelled against Goukouni in 1980, Nouri was once again by his side, and for this he was tried by a special criminal court and on June 13, 1981, sentenced together with Idriss Miskine to hard labour for life, while the leader of the FAN, Habré, was sentenced to death. This did not deter Nouri from returning to prominence when Habré conquered the capital N'Djamena in 1982: as Habré's right hand, Nouri became the new regime's number 2. In 1984 he was made Commissioner for External Affairs in the Executive Bureau of the country's only legal party, the National Union for Independence and Revolution (UNIR), and was to eventually obtain the chairmanship of the party.

One of Habré's most seasoned and flexible commanders, he participated to the final phase of the Chadian-Libyan conflict as commander of the Chadian forces during the battle of Aouzou in August 1987.

== With Idriss Déby and breakup ==
After Habré was ousted by the rebel forces of Idriss Déby in December 1990, Nouri became a close ally of the new President and a pillar of his regime. In the transitional coalition government formed following the 1993 Sovereign National Conference, Nouri became Minister of Health under Prime Minister Fidèle Moungar. In 1995, when Koibla Djimasta was appointed as the last transitional Prime Minister, Nouri was named Minister of the Interior; while holding this post, he also chaired the Commission Nationale Recensement Électoral (CNRE), created in 1995 to organise the voter registration for the first multiparty elections in Chad since independence. Following Déby's victory in the 1996 presidential election, Nouri was moved from his post as Minister of the Interior to that of Minister for Livestock. He kept the latter post for five years; he left it on February 24, 2001, when he was appointed as Minister of National Defence in the government chaired by Nagoum Yamassoum. He left his post and the government three years later, during a cabinet reshuffle that took place on February 2, 2004. Nouri's entourage gave ill health as the reason for his departure. He was successively posted for two years to Saudi Arabia as an ambassador, until he left his position on May 6, 2006.

Nouri stepped down on the eve of the controversial second reelection of Déby as President, arguing that the country was undergoing one of the gravest crises in its history and that the responsibility for this was exclusively Déby's. He also made clear that while joining the rebellion he had no intention of becoming a member of any existing armed movement. The former ambassador was promptly attacked by the Chadian government, whose spokesman Hourmadji Mousa Doumgor accused him of paying men in Sudan US $250 each to join the group he was allegedly forming. As a means of weakening Nouri's Gorane power-base, it was reported that in August the Chadian government started arming the Kamaya Gorane subclan, historically rivals of the Anakaza, thus stirring further hostility among the Gorane.

Judged a charismatic and experienced leader, Nouri was considered the greatest threat faced by Déby since the rebellion of another former Minister of Defense, Youssouf Togoïmi. Another reason of danger represented by Nouri for Déby was that he may have been seen by Regional powers such as the Libya as an acceptable alternative to the current president. Such scenarios were elaborated by the Chadian newspaper Le Temps, which, remembering Nouri's past links with Sudan and Egypt while a man of Habré, speculates about a French and plan to overthrow Déby with Egyptian and Sudanese support. Part of the alleged plan would be his taking the overall command of the Chadian armed opposition from the contested Mohammed Nour.

== Foundation of the UFDD ==
Nouri directed himself to Sudan and gave birth in July to a new formation, the Union of Forces for Progress and Democracy (Union des forces pour le progrès et la démocratie or UFPD). On the morning of October 22 Nouri founded a new rebel coalition, the Union of Forces for Democracy and Development (UFDD), which included three movements: his UFPD, the Democratic Revolutionary Council (CDR) led by Acheikh ibn Oumar and a splinter faction of the United Front for Democratic Change under Abdelwahid Aboud Mackaye, giving birth to a Toubou-Arab coalition. Acheikh became Vice-President while Nouri obtained the presidency, allegedly installed by the Sudanese military intelligence. On the same day the new formation left its bases for in Darfur and with 800 men mounted on 70 off-road vehicles passed for the first time the Chadian-Sudanese border. It directed its attack towards the town of Goz Beïda, that was briefly occupied, while the following day it was Am Timan to end under attack. The Chadian Prime Minister Pascal Yoadimnadji immediately accused the Sudanese government of being behind the attack, arguing that the rebels had attacked from Sudan and that they could not have obtained their military equipment without Sudanese help.

Shortly after its formation three smaller armed groups joined the UFDD: these were the Armed Resistance against Anti-Democratic Forces (RAFAD) led by Hassan Dahab, the Popular Rally for Justice (RPJ) led by Abakar Tollimi, and the National Democratic Rally (RND) led by Adouma Hassaballah. Also with the help of the latter commander the Ouaddaians became together with the Gorane and the Arabs one of the three key elements of the UFDD.

In November the Sudanese government ceased to support the FUC, which signed in December a peace accord with Déby, and supported in its place Nouri's movement, making it the most powerful anti-Déby insurgency. While possibly not strong enough to remove by force the president, Nouri's forces laid siege to key towns in eastern Chad in late 2006, in particular occupying briefly on November 25 Abéché, the main city in eastern Chad. After the fall of Abéché, French sources had warned that the capital N'Djamena could have been attacked in 24 hours; this eventually did not take place, possibly because of Nouri's stated decision to avoid direct attacks on the capital, but to point instead for a war or of attrition, employing hit and run tactics: "our objective so to defeat the enemy troops is to progressively weaken them ... we have inflicted heavy losses on Déby's army, we are now withdrawing ... our final objective remains the fall of N'Djamena, but without haste".

These attacks generated what were read as signs of increasing desperation on part of the government, partly due to France's evident hesitations, with the Minister of Communication Hourmadji Doumgor accusing on November 27 not only Sudan but also Saudi Arabia of being behind the UFDD, alleging that the 60% of its forces were child soldiers recruited in the madrasahs of Riyadh, Mecca and Jeddah. This may be part of an attempt to present the current Chadian conflict as part of the global war on terrorism, so to attract the support of the United States. The government has also insisted on the relations that have linked in the past both Nouri and Acheikh to Habré to allege that the former president was behind the insurgency. Nouri has denied receiving any support from Saudi Arabia, while he has said that Sudan, in retaliation for the support provided by Déby to the Darfur rebels, supports the Chadian opposition. Coming to the Habré legacy, Nouri refused to criticize him, saying he represented a figure whose ultimate judgment expected to history.

In explaining his political goals to Radio France Internationale in February 2007, Nouri said that the forces that support him "beat themselves for justice and to overthrow the regime in power in Chad as a mean to restore in Chad justice and democracy". Nouri denied he was fighting for personal power, and instead claimed that if victorious "we intend to organise a national forum, during which a short transition will take place ... to reach free and fair elections".

== Defections within the UFDD ==
The UFDD has suffered by internal dissensions that have ultimately given birth to the UFDD-Fondamentale led by Abdelwahit About and Acheikh ibn Oumar. This was caused by the expulsion in April 2007 from the movement of the UFDD vice-president ibn Oumar, whose Arab elements have played a key role in the battles that took place in late 2006. But when Acheikh asked for a major space for his men in the movement's organization, he was replaced by Nouri with Adoum Hassab Allah and his Ouaddaian fighters. Thus the UFDD is considered to be dominated by the Toubous, as claimed also by a former cadre of the movement, Habib Dinguess, who has said that Anakaza clan members have taken full control of the movement, in particular those linked to the old Habré regime, first of all Guihini Koreï, once head of the Documentation and Security Directorate (DDS), Habré's secret police. The UFDD awnsered that Dinguess claims were "ridiculous and shameful" and part of a campaign "to denounce all those that oppose Déby as linked to Habré, or Anakaza or Gorane" and added that Korei was only one of many cadres in the movement.

As for Acheikh, he was followed in his defection by Aboud Mackaye; together these two founded in May the Arab-dominated Union of Forces for Democracy and Development-Fundamental (UFDD-F).

== Peace talks ==
To put an end to the conflict among the Chadian government and the rebels the first to propose himself as a mediator was in April 2007 the former president Goukouni Oueddei, who said he would contact both Nouri and Timane Erdimi, leader of the Rally of Democratic Forces, an idea that Déby said to agree on. Eventually talk peaces sponsored by the Libyan leader Muammar al-Gaddafi began in Tripoli on June 23 between the Chadian government, whose delegation was led by Infrastructure Minister Adoum Younousmi, and a rebel one, which included a delegation formed by Mahamat Nouri for the UFDD, Timane Erdimi for the Gathering of Forces for Change (the former RaFD), Hassan al-Djineidi for the Chadian National Concord (CNT) and Aboud Mackaye for the UFDD-F. Through these talks a preliminary peace agreement was signed on October 3, which was criticized by part of the rebels as being too vague regarding the terms for disarmament and reintegration of their respective forces into the Chadian military. Further negotiations brought on October 25 to a final peace agreement signed on October 25 in Sirte, at the presence of Déby, Gaddafi and the Sudanese President Omar al-Bashir. As part of the deal, the rebels and the government have agreed to an immediate ceasefire, a general amnesty and the right for the rebels to join the military and the insurgent groups to become political parties. and the "total respect for the Chadian constitution." While signing the accord, Nouri has moved objections to the government request that the rebels disarm before being reintegrated into the national army.

On November 23 Nouri attacked Déby, saying "I think that N'Djamena forgot about the accord", and adding: "We were to meet them in Khartoum in order to study the practical aspects and how to apply them, but the Chadian government did not send their delegation". He then passed to warn Déby that "On November 25, the Tripoli agreement will be null and void, and the ceasefire will be off", menacing to restart the war. Similar warnings were also issued by Timane Erdimi for the RFC. The Chadian government awnsered the following day by saying to be "unpleasantly surprised" by Nouri and Erdimi's accusations, stating it was "ready on our part to implement the accord."

On November 26 the truce broke down, with governative troops heavily attacking the UFDD positions on the Chadian-Sudanese border. The government had previously accused them of attacking in the weekend, even before the formal end of the ceasefire on Sunday, attacking the Chadian gendarmes which protected the refugee camps. It was also reported that rebels entered the town of Hadjer Hadid on Saturday exchanging fire with the troops there. Nouri and Déby traded accusations on the ultimate responsible of the renewal of the conflict, with Nouri stating that "now that the fire has started, there is no more ceasefire." A western observer later stated that the rebels had signed the peace agreement "while preparing for war", and Nouri himself supported this, saying "nobody believed" in the accord.

== Renewed war ==
What followed in the successive weeks has been reported as the worst fighting seen in Chad since almost 20 years, with Déby's forces successfully resisting to the rebel attacks, keeping them east of the Goz Beïda-Abéché-Kalaït line; while in the first violent important clash among the UFDD and the army at Abou Galem on October 26 losses had been about equal on each side, in the following days the UFDD suffered heavy losses, losing most of his troops. This was in part recognized by Nouri, when to justify the UFDD's inactivity after the clashes he said that "both sides are tending to their wounds but the next battle will be decisive."

After the rebels had been pushed back to their bases in Sudan, the UFDD's secretary-general Abakar Tollimi recognized that a problem had been the "bad coordination" among the UFDD and the RFC. To obviate to this problem and under Sudanese pressure to act in this direction the rebels decided to counter Déby by reaching a major level of integration. Thus on December 13 the UFDD, the UFDD-F and the RFC announced the creation a Unified Military Command with a collegial leadership formed by Nouri, Erdimi and Aboud Mackaye, a joint military structure and a joint spokesman, who was to be Abderaman Koulamallah. The UFDD could count at this moment on 2,000-3,000 men, while the allied RFC had around 800 troops, and the UFDD-F 500.

On January 28, 2008, in an attack said to be planned by the Sudanese Defence Minister Abd-er-Rahim Mohamed Hussein, Nouri and his allies left Sudan with 2,000 troops mounted on 250 pick-ups. On February 1 they successfully routed at Massaguet a governative counteroffensive, investing on the following day the Chadian capital. After two days of intense fighting that left hundreds of dead the rebels retreated on February 3 calling for reinforcements. These were intercepted and defeated by Déby's Sudanese ally, the Justice and Equality Movement (JEM), thus forcing the rebels to give up for good and moved to Mongo in central Chad to regroup.

== Reorganization ==
The rebel defeat has been attributed by one side to a misjudgement of Déby's strength, which brought to an attack with too few troops and heavy weapons, and by the other side due to divisions among the rebel commanders. While stating that the troops were well coordinated during the battle, some of the participants mentioned the three-headed leadership as one of the reasons for the defeat. The rivality among the groups had surfaced easily during the groups, as recognized by Nouri: "In Ndjamena we wanted to send out a radio message, but we were unable to agree on which leader was going to read it out", adding that "after the fall of the regime our objectives are different."

To resolve the internal disputes, it was decided, as announced by the joint spokesman Koulamallah, that "we have decided not to return to Ndjamena without having a single leadership". As expected, this generated serious divisions: when Nouri announced the creation of a new military formation, the National Alliance, of which he was to be the President, the new group saw the exclusion of the RFC. As stated by a RFC spokesman Erdimi's faction had "categorically refused the designation of Nouri", and had thus left the coalition. According to RFC sources, the Sudanese government had exerted pressures so that Nouri was made leader. The latter stated that the RFC even if "it hadn't wanted to join us, it remained an ally". The new alliance was composed by the UFDD and UFDD-F, and also a third group, the Front for the Health of the Republic (FSR) led by Ahmat Soubiane, which was not part of the previous Unified Military Command.

This turn of events immediately generated a new split in the UFDD: the Vice-President of the movement, Adouma Hassaballah, left the coalition in March and with elements taken from both the UFDD and the RFC founded the Union des Forces pour le Changement et la Démocratie (UFCD), which currently claims 2,000 men. As recognized by Nouri, "the Ouaddaians from the two movements have made a split so to form their own group". According to Nouri, the split had been detonated by his assumption of the leadership of the AN: "the Ouaddaians put in doubt my leadership, which they had initially accepted, and said that it was Sudan that had imposed me as head". Nouri also said that the AN was ready to accept the UFCD in his new coalition.
