= Daoud Soumain =

- Died: February 2, 2008; Chad
- Military career
- Allegiance: Chad
- Rank: Chief of Army Staff
- Conflicts: Second Chadian Civil War: 2008 Battle of N'Djamena †

Daoud Soumain (died February 2, 2008) was the Chadian Chief of Army Staff. While Deputy Chief of Staff he was given in 2003 command of the Chadian contingent sent in the Central African Republic (CAR), which had been sent to consolidate the CAR President François Bozizé's rule as he had just risen to power. Later promoted to Chief of Staff, he was killed in the 2008 Battle of N'Djamena during a war between rebels and the government.
