= Kalait =

- Sub-prefecture
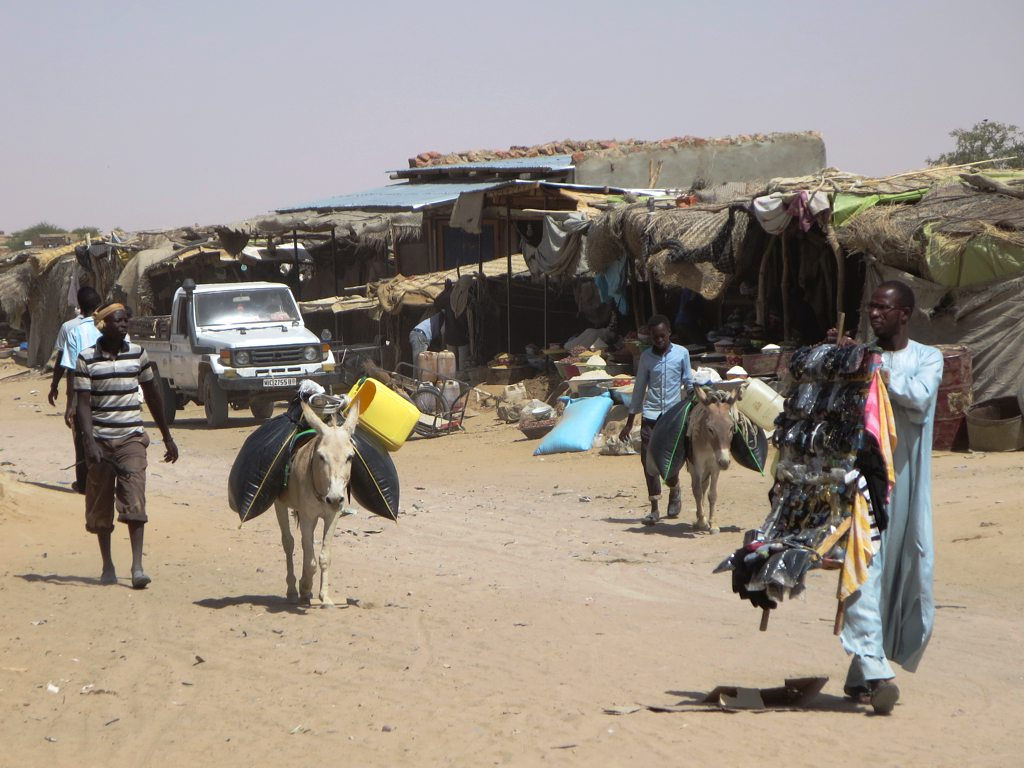
- Country: Chad

Kalait is a sub-prefecture of Ennedi Ouest Province in Chad.
