= War in Chad =

War in Chad or Chadian Civil War may refer to:

- Chadian Civil War (1965–1979)
- Chadian–Libyan War
  - Toyota War
- Chadian Civil War (2005–2010)
- Insurgency in Chad (2016–present)
  - 2021 Northern Chad offensive
