= Mourtcha =

Department of Ennedi-Ouest, Chad

Mourtcha is a department of Ennedi-Ouest region in Chad. Its capital is Kalait.

== See also ==
- Departments of Chad
