= Fongoro people =

The Fongoro, Kole or Gelege are an ethnic group of Sudan and Chad; they live in the Sila Region of Chad along the Sudanese border and numbered around 2,000 in 1984. The primary language is Fongoro.

== History ==
The Fongoro historically inhabited the more marginal areas within the Darfur Sultanate. The Fongoro have been pushed into their present location as a consequence of Fur and Arab expansion since the 18th century. The present Fongoro are facing rapid assimilation, where many living in cities and towns populated by Furs are becoming assimilated.

== Culture ==
The Fongoro engage in hunting and gathering. Some Fongoro also engage in farming, mainly cultivating sorghum.

The Fongoro adhere to Islam.
