= Am Dam =

Am Dam أم دام
- Location in Chad
- Coordinates: 12°45′44″N 20°28′13″E
- Country: Chad
- Region: Sila
- Department: Djourf Al Ahmar
- Sub-Prefecture: Am Dam
- Elevation: 1,453 ft (443 m)
- Time zone: + 1

Am Dam (Arabic: أم دام) is the capital of Djourf Al Ahmar Department in Sila Region, Chad, located at an important crossroads in the Batha River valley. It is a small town about 120 km (75 mi) northwest of Goz-Beida and 700 km (430 mi) by road from the capital N'Djamena. Am Dam is also the name of the Sub-Prefecture that the city is within. The population of the entire Am Dam Sub-Prefecture is 77,593.

The town is served by Am Dam Airport.

== History ==
It was captured by rebels advancing on N'Djamena on June 15, 2008. A battle near the town stopped an attempted rebel offensive in May 2009 and put the town under Chadian government control again, with more than 200 reported deaths.
