= Dalola raid =

The Chadian village of Dalola was raided on May 1, 2006, by 150 Janjaweed. The raid came two days before a highly controversial, scheduled presidential election in which current Chadian President, Idriss Déby was expected to win another five-year term in office. UNHCR spokesman Matthew Conway said, while in the city of Abéché, that according to survivors of the attack 1,000 cattle were stolen when "three small settlements near the larger village of Dalola were surrounded by Janjaweed. Some were seen in military uniform others in military attire. The Janjaweed opened fire on them and the gunfire lasted one hour. Afterwards they were seen heading southeast towards Koukou and the border. Initial reports show four dead and six wounded by bullets. They have been brought to the health centre at Goz Amer refugee camp. We are being told that they were Janjaweed. The 'Janjaweed' seem to be taking advantage of huge security vacuums on the Chad-Sudan border."

Those who escaped the raid were treated by Italian doctors at Goz Amer refugee camp, located a few miles from Dalola where 17,000 Fur refugees from Sudan are currently living.
