= Acheikh Ibn-Oumar =

Chadian politician and military leader

- الشيخ ابن عمر
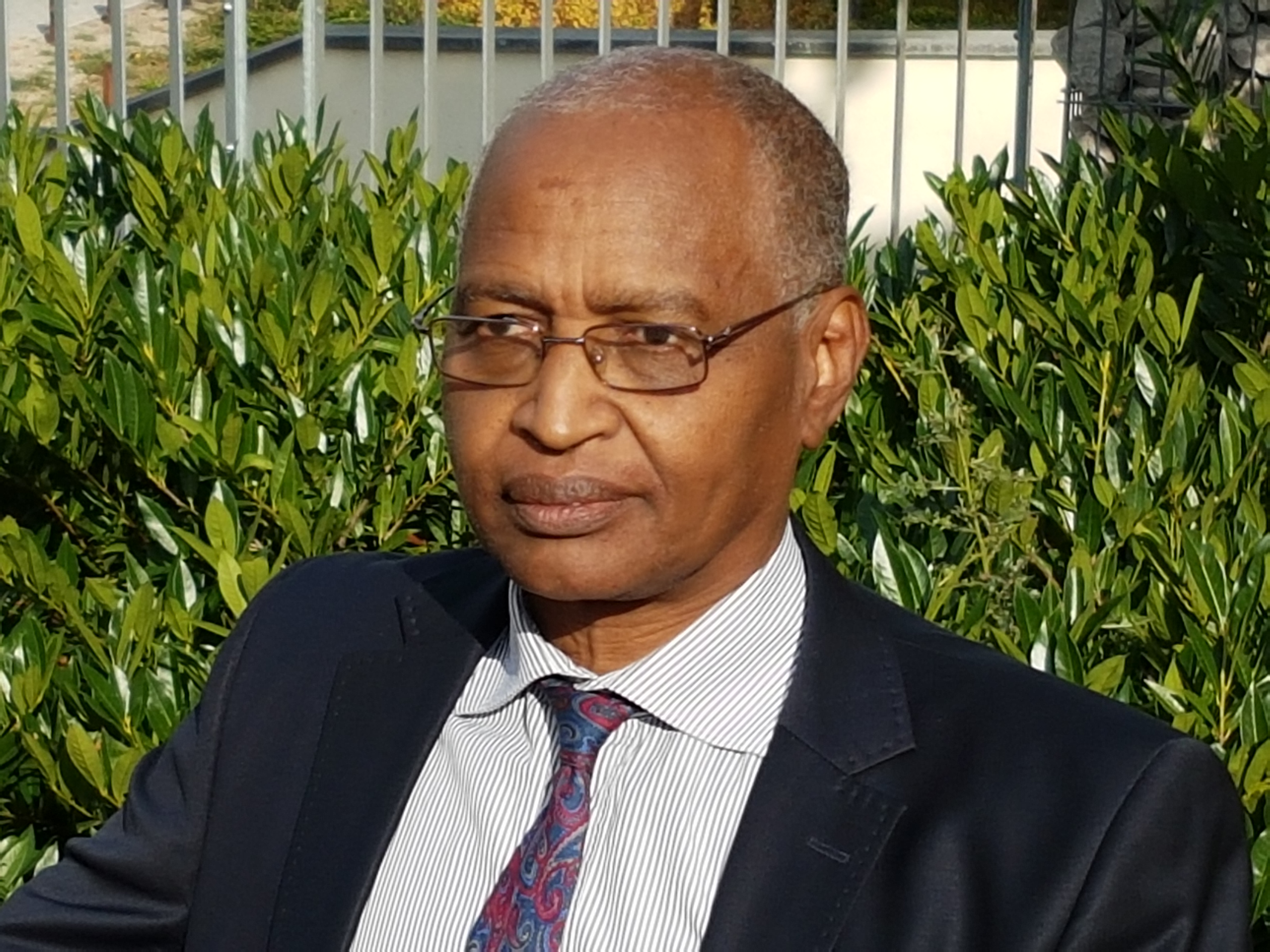

Ministry of Foreign Affairs
- In office 3 March 1989 – 3 December 1990

Head of the Democratic Revolutionary Council

Personal details
- Born: 13 July 1951 (age 75) Oum Hadjer, French Chad

Acheikh Ibn-Oumar (born 1951) is a Chadian politician and military leader.

== Biography ==
=== Chadian civil war (1965-1979) ===
In the 1970s, Acheikh ibn Oumar studied mathematics in France, and then, in the late 70's, joined the historical Chadian revolutionary mouvement

Acheikh ibn Ouma is the leader of the African student movement in France, then joined the Chadian National Liberation Front FROLINAT (Chad National Liberation Front; in French: "Front de Libération Nationale du Tchad), an armed group founded in 1966 to fight against the southern regime, under Dr. Abba Siddick, then under Goukouni Weddeye.

In 1979, at the end of the first civil war and after the FROLINAT had split into several factions, he broke with the central faction that remained loyal to Goukouni, the Popular Armed Forces (FAP), and joined Acyl Ahmat Akhbach's faction, named the Revolutionary Democratic Council (CDR). After the latter's death at the end of 1982, he took over leadership of the CDR.

=== Chadian civil war (1980-1987) ===
In the 1980s he led the Democratic Revolutionary Council (in French CDR: Conseil Démocratique Révolutionnaire), a military-political group opposing the government of President Hissène Habré.

He held several cabinet positions within the GUNT (Chad National Union Government; in French, "Gouvernement d'Union Nationale du Tchad"), led by Goukouni Weddeye (or Oueddei).

In November 1984, Acheikh Ibn-Oumar was arrested in Tripoli and then transferred to Tibesti where he remained in detention until December 1985, because of serious divergences with both late Colonel Gaddafi and Goukouni.

After a short-lived reconciliation with Goukouni, in 1986, Acheikh Ibn-Oumar and the CDR withdrew support for Goukouni Oueddei, leaving Goukouni isolated. Libya switched support from Goukouni to Ibn-Oumar, backing Ibn-Oumar's forces as they took Ennedi in northern Chad, and sending aircraft and tanks to help Ibn-Oumar defend against a counter-attack by Toubou forces loyal to Goukouni.

In mid-November 1986, supported by Libya, Ibn-Oumar became president of a newly constituted GUNT, consisting of seven of the original eleven factions. In 1987 Ibn-Oumar's militia was driven into Darfur by French and Chadian forces, fighting the Fur people there.

In defeat Acheikh Ibn Oumar distributed 1,500 automatic weapons to his Arab allies in Chad and "across the international boundary in Darfur."

=== Under president Deby (1987-2005) ===
In March 1988 Goukouni reestablished control of GUNT, and in June 1988 Oumar was arrested in Tripoli. After negotiations in Iraq, Ibn-Oumar returned to Chad in November 1988, this time heading forces supporting President Habré. Habré made Ibn-Oumar Minister of Foreign Affairs in 1989. As Minister of Foreign Affairs, Ibn-Oumar was the Chadian representative in Algiers for the 31 May 1989 effort at peaceful resolution of the dispute with Libya over the Aozou Strip.

Ibn-Oumar later served in President Déby's government., as Special Adviser (1991-1992), and afterwards as Chad's High Representative to The United Nations, and Ambassador to Washington (1992-1993)

In December 1999, Ibn-Oumar became the leader of a new political grouping, the Comité politique d'action et de liaison (CPAL). The CPAL consisted of an alliance between the CDR and three other armed groups, including the National Front of Chad (FNT), the Movement for Democracy and Justice in Chad (MJDT) and the Movement for the Unity of the Republic (MUR).

=== Chadian civil war (2005-2010) ===
In 2006 the CDR joined the UFDD alliance in opposition to President Déby, but Oumar left the UFDD in April 2007, and founded the UFDD-F with Aboud Mackaye.

In 2009, he participated in the latest armed coalition led by President Déby's own nephew, Timane Erimi, UFR.

=== Since 2010 ===
On November 5, 2018, he returned to Chad following the announcement of a general amnesty marking the transition to the Fourth Republic after 25 years of exile.[4] Upon his return to the country, he confided: "Political exile is an anomaly, an exception. The normal place of any politician or citizen concerned about the future of the country is to be within their society. Exile is neither a profession nor a vocation."

On January 21, 2019, he was appointed Technical Advisor for Foreign Affairs to the President of the Republic by decree.

In May 2021, Acheikh ibn Oumar was appointed Minister of State for Reconciliation and Dialogue in the transitional government formed by the Transitional Military Council (TMC), which took power following the death of President Déby.

In October 2022, after the end of the inclusive and sovereign national dialogue, a new government was appointed. Acheikh ibn Oumar left the government and was replaced by Abderaman Koulamallah as Minister of National Reconciliation in the government of Prime Minister Saleh Kebzabo
