= Popular Front for National Rebirth =

- Founder: Adoum Yacoub 'Kougou'
- Leader: Adoum Yacoub 'Kougou'

Popular Front for National Rebirth (French: Front populaire pour la renaissance nationale, abbr. FPRN) is a rebel group operating in Tissi area, where borders of CAR, Chad and Sudan meet.

It was founded in 2001 by Adoum Yacoub ‘Kougou’, a veteran of Chadian armed opposition groups. The group begun fighting in Darfur area along Sudanese Liberation Movement during the Darfur war. For most of its existence it operated in southeastern Chad. It is mostly composed of Ouaddaïan but it also has Masalit and Tama combatants. Its fighters are considered to have significant military experience.

== Activity ==
In 2001, the group was formed and begun fighting alongside SLM in West Darfur but it was pushed out by Sudanese Armed Forces into Chadian territory. In late 2007 FRPN joined UFR but it remained largely autonomous, it left UFR only several month after joining it. During its time in UFR, FRPN received 50–60 vehicles from Sudan.

During the Battle of Am Dam Chad retreated troops from its garrison in Tissi area, FRPN used this to capture the villages of Tissi, Tamassi and Djahaname, they placed landmines around the area to protect themselves. FRPN reached its peak, numbering several hundred fighters.

On 24 April 2010 Chadian military attacked FRPN in Tamassi and by 28 April they retook control of all areas held by FRPN. During this attack most FRPN fighters were killed or captured, while its leader, Adoum fled to Europe. FRPN continued to operate at CAR, Chad and Sudan border tri-point as a small rebel organization, since 2011 it has been mostly inactive.

By 2022, the FPRN under Adoum was considered "one of the main [rebel] groups" in Chad. It participated in the peace talks which were supposed to end the insurgency in Northern Chad.
