= Democratic Revolutionary Council =

Rebel faction in Chad

- Conseil démocratique révolutionnaire
- Founder: Ahmat Acyl †
- Leaders: Ahmat Acyl †; Acheikh ibn Oumar
- Ideology: Islamic socialism Francophobia; Arab nationalism
- Part of: UFDD (2006–2007); UFDD-F (from 2007)

The Democratic Revolutionary Council (French: Conseil démocratique révolutionnaire or CDR), active in Chad, was a faction of FROLINAT founded in 1977 by Ahmat Acyl and later headed by Acheikh ibn Oumar and was also known as the New Volcan Army.

== See also ==
- Chadian Civil War (disambiguation)
- Toyota War
