= Union of Forces for Democracy and Development–Fundamental =

- Union des Forces pour la Démocratie et le Développement – Fondamentale
- Founders: Abdelwahid Aboud Mackaye; Acheikh ibn Oumar; Amine Ben Barka
- Founded: May 2007
- Split from: UFDD
- Groups: FIDEL; CDR; CPR
- Ideology: Baggara Arabs interests Anti-Déby
- Part of: UFR (from 2009)

The Union of Forces for Democracy and Development–Fundamental (UFDD–F) is one of the rebel groups fighting in the war in Chad. It is led by Abdelwahid Aboud Mackaye. The UFDD-F is essentially an Arab organization, which was formed as a dissident split from the UFDD following tensions and conflicts of interest between Arab militants and Tubu militants who dominated the organization.
