= Battle of N'Djamena (2006) =

2006 battle between Chadian military and UFCD forces

Coordinates: 12.1164°N 15.0722°E

- Part of the Chadian Civil War (2005–2010)
Date	13 April 2006
Location	N'Djamena, Chad
Result	Chadian military victory

Belligerents
United Front for Democratic Change	Military of Chad

Commanders and leaders
Mohammed Nour Abdelkerim; Abdelwahid Aboud Mackaye	(Chad) Idriss Déby

Casualties and losses
370 killed 271 captured	30 killed
- Unknown number of civilians killed, 387 injured on both sides

The Battle of N'Djamena took place between the forces of the revolutionary United Front for Democratic Change (UFCD) and the military of Chad that occurred on 13 April 2006 when rebel forces launched an assault on the capital of Chad in the pre-dawn hours, attempting to overthrow the government of President Idriss Déby Itno from their bases an estimated thousand miles east.

The battle occurred just months after serious Chad-Sudan tensions ended with the signing of the Tripoli Agreement. Déby broke off relations with the government of Sudan as a result, expelling its diplomats and threatened to stop sheltering thousands of Sudanese refugees from the Darfur region. The government of Sudan has been documented by the United Nations to have engaged in mass murder of approximately 100,000 non-Arab civilians in Darfur in the period 2003–2006.

== The battle ==
The rebels attempted to seize the National Assembly building, but the assault was easily repulsed by the much more heavily armed Chadian government forces. At least 400 people, including 370 rebels, 30 government forces and some civilians, were killed in the fighting. 271 rebels were captured and paraded through the Place d'Independance the next day.

== Reactions ==
=== Chad ===
President Déby blamed the attack on the government of neighboring Sudan, claiming that many of the attackers were either Sudanese backed by their government or residents of Chad conscripted by the Sudanese. Subsequently, he threatened to expel 200,000 Sudanese refugees sheltering in the east of the country after repeating accusations that Sudan supports rebels who launched a new offensive to oust him. Déby backed away from this threat on 17 April 2006.

Déby repeatedly has accused Sudan of hiring mercenaries to overthrow his government. Sudan has denied the accusation, and in turn has accused Chad of supporting fighters in its volatile Darfur region, where Arab militias and African rebels have fought for nearly three years.

Déby claimed that the rebel attack was designed to encourage a constitutional vacuum leading to civil war, by disrupting the forthcoming May 3 presidential election, an election in which President Déby, who had been Chad's leader for sixteen years, successfully ran for a third term.

Déby dismissed the rebels as "petty mercenaries" and described the attack as "amateurish", saying that he was "not going anywhere". According to Déby, on the morning of the rebel attack, he "knew they were coming", and he and his wife Hinda were "listening to the cannon fire" while "[taking] our breakfast of strong coffee and warm croissant."

=== Other ===
The actions of the rebel forces were condemned by the United Nations Security Council. Secretary General Kofi Annan was quoted as saying he was "greatly troubled by the worsening security situation in Chad".

The Central African Republic closed off its border with Sudan on 14 April saying that the rebels had crossed into its territory on their way to N'Djamena.
