= Chadian Civil War (2005–2010) =

Ethno-religious conflict

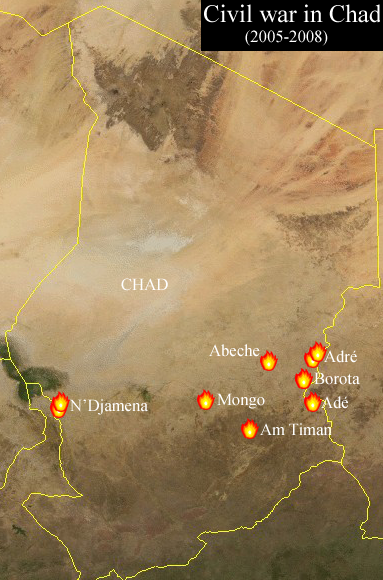
- Major flashpoints of the conflict
| Date | 18 December 2005 – 15 January 2010 (4 years and 4 weeks) |
| Location | Chad |
| Result | Chadian government victory |

Belligerents
| (Chad) Rebels: FUC; UFDD; RFD; CNT; CDR; UFDP; RDL; UFDD-F; SCUD; CNR; URF; UFCD; FSR; UFR; UMC; FPRN; UDC; MPRD; (Sudan) Janjaweed | Chad; France; Libya (Sudan) NMRD; JEM |

Commanders and leaders
| Mohammed Nour (RDL); Mahamat Nouri (UFDP, UFDD); Acheikh ibn Oumar (CDR); Timane Erdimi (RFD); Hassan al-Djinedi (CNT); Hassan Al Gadam (CNT); Abdelwahid Aboud Mackaye (UFDD-F); Yaya Djérou (SCUD); Khalil Abdallah (NMRD); Almado Mardo (CNR); Adouma Hassaballah (UFCD); Adam Yakub (FPRN) (Sudan) Omar al-Bashir | (Chad) Idriss Déby (France) Jacques Chirac (2005–07) (France) Nicolas Sarkozy (2007–10) (Libya) Muammar Gaddafi |

Strength
| FUC: 5,000–7,000 (2006); 3,000–4,000 (2008); UFDD: 2,000–3,000 (2006); 4,000–6,000 (2007–08); UFDD-F: 500 (2007); UFCD: 1,500 (2010); UFR: 3,000 (2010); RFC-RAFD: 800 (2006); 3,000 (2007); 800 (2010); CNT: 1,000–2,000 (2007); FSR: 500 (2007); FRPN: 800 (2007); MPRD: 500 (2007) | |

Casualties and losses
- 7,000 Killed; 200,000 refugees

The Chadian Civil War of 2005–2010 began on 18 December 2005. Since its independence from France in 1960, Chad has been swamped by civil wars between the Arab-Muslims of the north and the Sub-Saharan-Christians of the south. As a result, leadership and presidency in Chad drifted back and forth between the Christian southerners and Muslim northerners. When one side was in power, the other side usually started a revolutionary war to counter it.

France, which was the former colonial power, and Chad's northern neighbour Libya both became involved at various times throughout the civil war. By the mid-1990s the civil war had somewhat stabilised, and in 1996 Idriss Déby, a northerner, was confirmed president in Chad's first democratic election. In 1998 an armed rebellion began in the north, led by President Déby's former defence chief, Youssouf Togoimi. A Libyan peace deal in 2002 failed to put an end to the fighting. In 2003, conflict in the neighbouring Darfur region in Sudan leaked across the border into Chad. Refugees from Sudan were joined by Chadian civilians who were trying to escape rebel violence and eventually filled the camps. It was clear that Chad's rebels received weapons and assistance from the government of Sudan. At the same time, Sudanese rebels got help from the Chadian government. In February 2008, three rebel groups joined forces and launched an attack on Chad's capital, N'Djamena. After launching an assault that failed to seize the presidential palace, the attack was decisively repulsed. France sent in troops to shore up the government. Many of the rebels were former allies of President Idriss Déby. They accused him of corruption towards members of his own tribe.

== Causes ==
Many rebel leaders were former allies of Déby, who turned against him after he decided to change the constitution. The change in constitution allowed Déby to run for re-election in 2006, as well as gave power of changing the constitution to the president, this move caused several of Déby's allies to start a rebellion against him.

The battle at the start of December 2005 in the Chadian capital N'Djamena came as no surprise. For the years prior to the eruption, the Sudanese government was trying to overthrow the Chadian president, Idriss Déby, using Chadian rebels as middle men. The three armed groups involved in attacks in 2008 were armed by Sudanese security forces intent on cutting off the support that Déby was giving to the rebels in Darfur, especially the Justice and Equality Movement (JEM), which had been on the offensive in Darfur. The war in Chad was a result of four distinct forces.

For one, the war appeared to be a continuation of the conflicts of Darfur and Chad, which include the competition for power and land. Secondly, there was an internal Chadian conflict. Déby reverted to a one-man military rule after a hopeful broadening of the base of his regime in the late 1990s which was coupled by the growth of civil politics in N'Djamena. Déby relied heavily on a close-knit group of kinsmen and on claiming the allotted government finances for his own agenda, distributing aid in return for civilian loyalty. Third is the Sudanese government's strategy for managing security within its border, which include treating the weak surrounding states as merely extensions of its internal limits. The Sudanese security helped bring Déby to power in 1990 as part of their responsibility that also saw it engage militarily in Eritrea, Ethiopia, Uganda, Democratic Republic of Congo (DRC), and the Central African Republic (CAR) over the military decade. In the same way that Khartoum used a combination of extortion and retribution to control its provincial elites in Darfur, it used the same tools to influence its trans-border limits. Furthermore, the regional competition for dominance through an immense area of central Africa has rarely been governed by state authority. This isolated area includes Chad, the CAR, and northern DRC, as well as the areas of Tripoli and Sudan, with Kinshasa, Kigali, Kampala, and even Asmara competing for influence across this area, as well as Khartoum itself.

=== Outcome ===
The implementation of the reforms promised in an August 2007 agreement with opposition parties was slow and uneven. Throughout the country, government forces continued to arbitrarily arrest and detain civilians and suspected rebels, often on the basis of ethnicity, and subject them to what has been described as cruel and unusual punishment. Chad's prison conditions are among the harshest on the African continent, and weak institutions of justice contributed to a culture of exemption. The government has not investigated or prosecuted serious abuses against civilians, such as killings and rapes performed by government security forces and rebels following clashes at Am Dam in May 2009. More than 250,000 Sudanese refugees and 168,000 Chadian displaced people live in camps and elsewhere in eastern Chad. In April 2010, approximately 5,000 new Sudanese refugees arrived from West Darfur, following renewed fighting there between the Sudanese rebel group Justice and Equality Movement (JEM) and Sudanese government forces.

== Belligerents ==
The conflict involved Chadian government forces and several Chadian rebel groups. These include the United Front for Democratic Change, United Forces for Development and Democracy, Gathering of Forces for Change and the National Accord of Chad. The conflict has also involved the Janjaweed, while Sudan allegedly supported the rebels, while Libya mediated in the conflict, as well as diplomats from other countries.

== History ==
=== Major battles ===
==== SCUD raid on Guéréda ====
Chadian rebels attacked Guéréda, 120 kilometers north of Adré, on 7 December 2005, leaving ten dead and five wounded. The attack (attributed to the Platform for Change, Unity and Democracy, SCUD, a group of Chadian military deserters) marked the beginning of a campaign of rebel incursions from Darfur. The Chadian Government condemned Khartoum for backing the rebels.

=== RDL raid on Adré ===
On 18 December 2005, the Rassemblement pour la Démocratie et la Liberté (Rally for Democracy and Freedom, RDL), a Chadian rebel group based in Darfur, attacked the border town of Adré, Chad. Adré is the strategic key to Chad's defense against attacks launched from Sudan. Idriss Déby, prompted by defections from the Chadian army to Chadian rebel groups between October and December 2005, had begun reinforcing Adré, as well as Abéché, the capital of eastern Ouaddaï Province, even before the 18 December 2005 attack.

==== First battle of N’Djaména ====
In April 2006 Chadian rebel leader Mahamat Nour Abdelkarim, having brought together several Chadian rebel movements under the banner of the Front Uni pour le Changement (United Front for Change, FUC), laid siege to the Capital of N’Djamena. On 13 April 2006, 1,200 to 1,500 FUC rebels in 56 pickup trucks dashed hundreds of kilometers across Chad from bases in Darfur and the Central African Republic to fight pitched gun battles with Chadian security forces on the streets of the capital city. The fighting in Ndjaména lasted from 5 am to 11 am and included armored personnel carriers, technicals (4-wheel drive vehicles mounted with heavy weapons) and tanks, and was concentrated in the southeastern suburbs and at the Palais des Quinze, Chad's parliament, which rebel troops unfamiliar with the layout of the capital city mistook for the presidential palace.

With considerable assistance from the French military, the takeover attempt was thwarted, with hundreds killed.

Two mass graves are located in the southeastern suburbs of N’Djaména at a remote spot in Djari-Kawas, where government forces ambushed a rebel column. One mass grave was reported to contain 102 bodies, though reports conflict as to whether the dead were all rebel soldiers or a mix of rebels and civilians. The second mass grave at Djari-Kawas is said to contain 45 bodies that were buried there once they were released from the morgue at the central hospital.

On 14 April 2006 Chad unilaterally severed relations with Sudan. Though the two countries renewed their pledge to expel rebels from their territories in July and restored diplomatic relations in August, the April attack continued to cast a pall over bilateral relations.

==== Second Battle of N’Djaména ====
Chadian rebels led by Mahamat Nouri fought government forces in pitched street battles in N’Djaména on the morning of 2 February 2008. By the afternoon of the next day, rebel forces withdrew from the capital, short on ammunition and unhinged by the possibility that one member of the coalition, Timan Erdimi, had sought a separate accommodation with the government.

==== Battle of Am Dam ====
The Battle of Am Dam took place in and around the eastern Chadian town of Am Dam on 7 and 8 May 2009 when Chadian Army forces attacked a column of advancing Union of Forces for the Resistance (UFR) rebels.

=== Peace process ===
==== Withdrawal of the United Nations ====
In January 2009, the government of Chad requested that the United Nations begin the process of withdrawing the peacekeeping mission in eastern Chad. The Chad government cited the UN mission's slow deployment, uneven record of success, and improvements in the security situation as reasons for its decision. In May 2009, the UN revised the mission's mandate and authorized its gradual drawdown and closure by the end of the year, and effectively shifted full responsibility for the protection of civilians, including displaced populations and refugees from Darfur, to the Chadian security forces.

==== Harmony between Chad and Sudan ====
An agreement for the restoration of harmony between Chad and Sudan, signed 15 January 2010, marked the end of a five-year war. The fix in relations led to the Chadian rebels from Sudan returning home, the opening of the border between the two countries after seven years of closure, and the deployment of a joint force to secure the border. President Idriss Déby visited Khartoum, in February for the first time in six years; and in July, Chad, a state party to the International Criminal Court (ICC), hosted Sudanese President Omar al-Bashir, earning the doubtful claim of being the first ICC member state to harbor a suspect from the court. Following the UN decision to draw down the mission by the end of 2010, representatives of UN agencies formed a working group with the Chadian government to improve security for humanitarian groups in eastern Chad. The plan includes consolidation of the Chadian Integrated Security Detachment (DIS), a component of MINURCAT consisting of Chadian police forces trained by the UN, which provide security in and around the refugee camps. However, the plans do not clearly address the security concerns of refugees, internally displaced persons (IDPs), or the local population.

== International reactions ==
=== Israel ===
Israel has admitted to backing the government of Chad with "extensive" arms sales to the country, and in 2019 normalized relations with Chad.

=== Ukraine ===
Ukraine was one of the most Notable backers of the Chadian Government, supplying it with large amounts of weapons to use against Sudan-backed Rebels.

=== Romania ===
The Foreign Ministry of Romania condemned the Rebels, announcing that it wanted to send 120 Romanian Peacekeeping Troops into the Country to help negotiate a Ceasefire.

== See also ==
- History of Chad
- List of wars: 2003–present
- Chadian Civil War (1965–1979)
- Mediation of the Chadian Civil War (2005–10)
- Military of Chad
- Military of Sudan
- United Nations Mission in Sudan
- List of conflicts in Chad
- Insurgency in Northern Chad
- Chadian–Libyan conflict
