= Rally of Forces for Change =

Chadian rebel group

- Rassemblement des forces pour le changement
- Leaders: Timane Erdimi; Tom Erdimi
- Founded: 1 May 2006
- Split from: SCUD
- Headquarters: Geneina
- Ideology: Bidayet Zaghawa interests Anti-Déby
- Wars: Chadian Civil War

The Rally of Forces for Change (in French: Rassemblement des forces pour le changement or RFC), formerly the Rally of Democratic Forces (in French: Rassemblement des Forces Démocratiques or RaFD) is a Chadian rebel group formed mainly by Zaghawa, ethnic group to which President Idriss Déby belonged, deserters from the Chadian government and army and led by Timane and his twin brother Tom Erdimi. It is currently allied to the United Front for Democratic Change rebel group and both were dedicated to overthrowing Erdimi's uncle, Chadian President Idriss Déby and his administration. The 12,000 troops that make up the RFC were expected to disrupt the 2006 presidential elections, but they did not, and President Déby returned to power.

== September 2006 government offensive ==
On September 19, 2006, the Government of Chad began a campaign involving 3,000 against the RFC, according to the Military of Chad. The troops attacked RFC rebels at the Hadjer Marfaine area bordering Sudan, while simultaneously attacking other groups within the UFDC at Moudeina, and Aram Kolle. Mahamat Inee, RFC spokesperson, said, "We were attacked by two columns of government troops on 19 September, but we repelled them." Inee said the RFC took 43 government soldiers prisoner, and seized 40 jeeps and trucks and two tanks. He confirmed news reports that French Mirage fighter jets stationed in Abeche made surveillance runs over the RFC's position. Timane Edrimi warned that "all French citizens, military or civil, that fall into the hands of our combatants will be considered like mercenaries and treated accordingly."
