= Timane Erdimi =

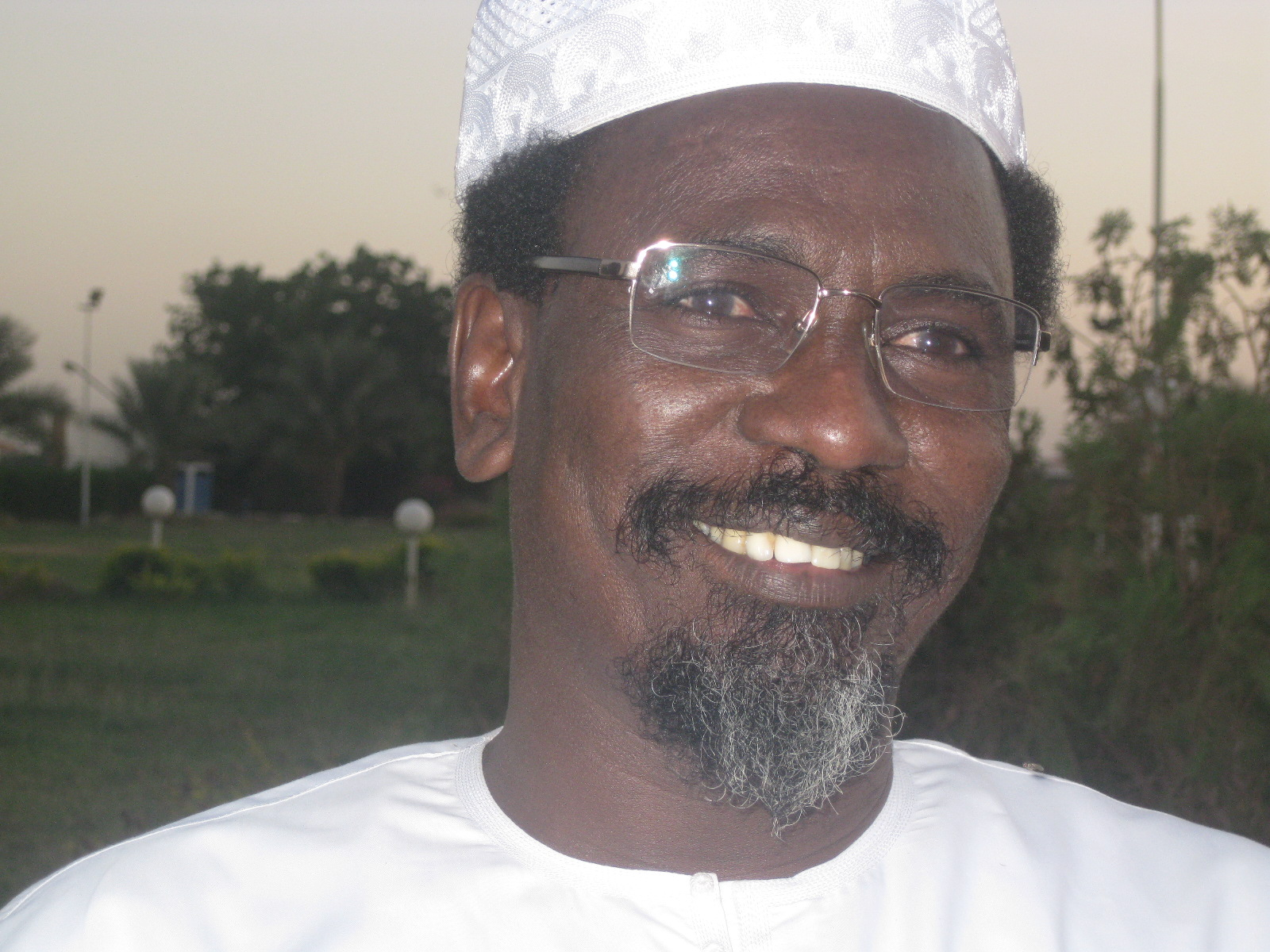
- Erdimi, c. 2008

Leader of the Rally of Forces for Change
- Incumbent
- Assumed office 2006

Personal details
- Born: Chad

Timane Erdimi is a Chadian politician and militant leader who is the leader of the Chadian rebel group Rally of Democratic Forces (Rassemblement des Forces pour le Changement, RFC) which had 800 soldiers in early 2008. He is a member of the ethnic group Zaghawa and nephew of the Chadian President Idriss Déby.

== Biography ==
An international arrest warrant was issued by Chad for Erdimi in 2007. He was among 12 people sentenced to death in absentia by a Chadian court on August 15, 2008. Responding to this sentence, Erdimi said that he had been unaware of the trial and remarked that it was his opponents in the government who "should be put on trial".

Despite past differences, various rebel groups, including the RFC, agreed to unite as the Union of Resistance Forces on January 19, 2009. Erdimi said that this move would "allow us to better fight against the regime", and he spoke scornfully of the improvements Déby had made to his military, saying that Déby "should have bought robots for his new tanks and planes" because "he won't find anyone to drive and fly them when we attack." The Union of Resistance Forces reportedly chose Erdimi by consensus to lead the new group on January 23.

By 2017, Erdimi was living in exile in Qatar; from there, he was still commanding a loyal rebel force which was based in southern Libya. His continued activities resulted in Chad severing diplomatic relations with Qatar, arguing that the later state was supporting "terrorism".

2019 Erdimi was arrested in his home in France for connection with "his activities in Sudan between 2005 and 2010", Although he was later freed because of his medical condition.

In 2022 Erdimi returned to Chad after 17 years in exile, days ahead of the start of national talks aimed at paving the way for elections after Mahamat Déby seized power. Later that year, he was appointed as higher education minister, serving until his resignation in 2026.
