= Union of Forces for Democracy and Development =

Rebel forces in Chad

- Union des forces pour la démocratie et le développement
- Leaders: Mahamat Nouri; Acheikh ibn Oumar
- Founded: 22 October 2006
- Groups: CDR (until May 2007); FUC; RAFAD; RND; RPJ; UFPD
- Headquarters: Darfur
- Ideology: Tubu interests Baggara Arabs interests (until May 2007); Anti-Déby
- Wars: Chadian Civil War; Libyan civil war (2014–2020); Insurgency in Chad (2016–present)

The Union of Forces for Democracy and Development is the largest group of Chadian rebel forces opposed to former President Idriss Déby. It was formed in October 2006 under the leadership of Mahamat Nouri.

The group consists of:

- United Front for Democratic Change
- Democratic Revolutionary Council
- Union of Forces for Progress and Democracy

== History ==
On 22 October 2006, the newly formed Union attacked the eastern Chad town of Goz Beida. Although it was initially unclear if they succeeded or if the government was able to defend the city, it later became clear that the Union had captured the city, along with several other cities like Am Timan.

In 2016, the Front for Change and Concord in Chad was born as it split from the UFDD. This group is led by Mahamat Mahdi Ali, who studied in France where he was a Socialist Party member. The group is considered by the authorities "the most well-supplied with fighters and weapons". The FACT led the latest major offensive from rear bases in Libya, which left the death of the President Déby on 19 April 2021, and weeks later the military junta that took power, led by his son the General Mahamat Idriss Déby Itno, claimed to have killed several hundred FACT fighters, who retreated into southern Libya.

FACT refused to sign the agreement with the government, saying in a statement that this "rejection is concomitant with the failure to take into account our demands", such as the release of prisoners. The rebel group also stated that it "remains available for dialogue everywhere and always".

== See also ==
- War in Chad (2005–2010)
