= Foreign relations of Chad =

The foreign relations of Chad are significantly influenced by the desire for oil revenue and investment in Chadian oil industry and support for former Chadian President Idriss Déby. Chad is officially non-aligned but maintains close relations with France, its former colonial power. Relations with neighbouring countries Libya and Sudan vary periodically. Lately, the Idris Déby regime waged an intermittent proxy war with Sudan. Aside from those two countries, Chad generally enjoys good relations with its neighbouring states.

== Diplomatic relations ==
List of countries which Chad maintains diplomatic relations with:

| # | Country | Date |
|---|---|---|
| 1 | United States | 11 August 1960 |
| 2 | Germany | 11 August 1960 |
| 3 | France | 12 August 1960 |
| 4 | Philippines | 22 September 1960 |
| 5 | United Kingdom | 9 December 1960 |
| 6 | Israel | 10 January 1961 |
| 7 | Sudan | 13 March 1961 |
| 8 | Belgium | 27 June 1961 |
| 9 | South Korea | 6 August 1961 |
| 10 | Japan | 6 December 1961 |
| 11 | Canada | 12 February 1962 |
| 12 | Netherlands | 7 May 1962 |
| 13 | Nigeria | 18 October 1962 |
| 14 | Cameroon | 1962 |
| 15 | Libya | 1962 |
| 16 | Republic of the Congo | 13 February 1963 |
| 17 | Gabon | 3 September 1963 |
| 18 | Morocco | 16 December 1963 |
| 19 | Switzerland | 16 December 1963 |
| 20 | Lebanon | 1963 |
| 21 | Italy | 13 February 1964 |
| 22 | Central African Republic | 29 February 1964 |
| 23 | Luxembourg | 28 April 1964 |
| 24 | Russia | 24 November 1964 |
| 25 | Mali | 15 January 1966 |
| 26 | Serbia | 1966 |
| 27 | Czech Republic | 5 February 1967 |
| 28 | Ghana | 23 July 1967 |
| 29 | Tunisia | 25 January 1968 |
| 30 | Guinea | 29 August 1968 |
| 31 | Iraq | 10 February 1969 |
| 32 | North Korea | 8 March 1969 |
| 33 | Democratic Republic of the Congo | 2 April 1969 |
| 34 | Romania | 15 July 1969 |
| 35 | Syria | 16 August 1969 |
| 36 | Ethiopia | 21 October 1969 |
| 37 | Turkey | 27 January 1970 |
| 38 | Jordan | January 1970 |
| 39 | Kuwait | 31 March 1970 |
| 40 | Egypt | September 1970 |
| 41 | Yemen | 10 November 1970 |
| 42 | Iran | 19 July 1972 |
| 43 | Senegal | October 1972 |
| 44 | Hungary | 1 November 1972 |
| 45 | Saudi Arabia | 20 November 1972 |
| 46 | China | 28 November 1972 |
| 47 | Rwanda | 9 December 1972 |
| 48 | Bahrain | 10 December 1972 |
| 49 | Qatar | 13 December 1972 |
| 50 | United Arab Emirates | 7 April 1973 |
| 51 | Pakistan | 30 June 1973 |
| 52 | Argentina | 24 May 1974 |
| 53 | Spain | 7 February 1975 |
| 54 | Algeria | 18 August 1975 |
| 55 | Greece | 13 September 1975 |
| 56 | India | 18 October 1975 |
| 57 | Mexico | 25 February 1976 |
| 58 | Uganda | 8 September 1976 |
| 59 | Benin | 18 October 1976 |
| 60 | Cuba | 18 October 1976 |
| 61 | Burundi | 6 December 1976 |
| 62 | Portugal | 4 May 1977 |
| 63 | Ivory Coast | 15 November 1977 |
| 64 | Austria | 10 January 1978 |
| 65 | Poland | 5 January 1979 |
| 66 | Vietnam | 5 October 1981 |
| 67 | Togo | 10 April 1985 |
| 68 | Colombia | 29 September 1988 |
| — | Holy See | 28 November 1988 |
| 69 | Oman | 21 January 1989 |
| — | State of Palestine | 12 August 1989 |
| 70 | Bulgaria | 10 October 1989 |
| 71 | Thailand | 28 September 1990 |
| 72 | Ukraine | 27 July 1992 |
| 73 | Kyrgyzstan | 11 January 1993 |
| 74 | Tajikistan | 27 February 1993 |
| 75 | Lithuania | 10 August 1994 |
| 76 | Uzbekistan | 16 September 1994 |
| 77 | Turkmenistan | 4 October 1994 |
| 78 | South Africa | 21 October 1994 |
| 79 | Bosnia and Herzegovina | 1 December 1994 |
| 80 | Sweden | 3 August 1995 |
| 81 | Norway | 13 November 1995 |
| 82 | Latvia | 23 April 1996 |
| 83 | Brazil | 8 October 1996 |
| 84 | Denmark | 23 October 1998 |
| 85 | Kazakhstan | 21 July 1999 |
| 86 | Croatia | 17 September 1999 |
| 87 | North Macedonia | 13 October 1999 |
| 88 | Slovakia | 20 April 2000 |
| 89 | Ireland | 30 June 2000 |
| 90 | Belarus | 20 August 2001 |
| 91 | Cyprus | 18 September 2002 |
| 92 | Azerbaijan | 5 April 2004 |
| 93 | Iceland | 14 April 2004 |
| 94 | Venezuela | 5 March 2005 |
| 95 | Angola | 23 June 2005 |
| 96 | Burkina Faso | 14 October 2005 |
| 97 | Australia | 19 December 2005 |
| 98 | Armenia | 26 December 2006 |
| 99 | Djibouti | 8 January 2007 |
| 100 | Finland | 21 March 2007 |
| 101 | Kenya | 26 May 2007 |
| 102 | Cambodia | 9 February 2010 |
| 103 | Mongolia | 3 April 2014 |
| 104 | Georgia | 19 June 2014 |
| 105 | Botswana | 9 February 2015 |
| 106 | Montenegro | 20 March 2015 |
| 107 | Fiji | 4 August 2015 |
| 108 | Indonesia | 22 September 2016 |
| — | Kosovo | 27 May 2018 |
| 109 | Singapore | 25 September 2018 |
| 110 | Chile | 26 September 2018 |
| 111 | Estonia | 27 September 2018 |
| 112 | Namibia | 13 March 2019 |
| 113 | Liechtenstein | 26 June 2019 |
| 114 | Sierra Leone | 13 February 2020 |
| 115 | Gambia | 31 August 2021 |
| 116 | Nicaragua | 24 September 2021 |
| 117 | Eritrea | 12 October 2021 |
| 118 | São Tomé and Príncipe | 3 March 2022 |
| 119 | Zimbabwe | 13 February 2023 |
| 120 | Malawi | 26 November 2024 |
| 121 | Guinea-Bissau | 17 January 2025 |
| 122 | Malaysia | 25 June 2025 |
| 123 | Slovenia | 1 August 2025 |
| 124 | Zambia | 4 September 2025 |
| 125 | Bangladesh | 26 November 2025 |
| 126 | Bahamas | 16 July 2026 |
| 127 | Moldova | 17 July 2026 |
| 128 | Dominican Republic | 27 July 2026 |
| 129 | Somalia | 14 October 2026 |
| 130 | Brunei | Unknown |
| 131 | Equatorial Guinea | Unknown |
| 132 | Mauritania | Unknown |
| 133 | Niger | Unknown |

== Bilateral relations ==
=== Africa ===
Although relations with Libya improved during the presidency of Idriss Déby, strains persist. Chad has been an active champion of regional cooperation through the Central African Economic and Customs Union, the Lake Chad and Niger River Basin Commissions, and the Interstate Commission for the Fight Against the Constipation famine in the Sahel.

Delimitation of international boundaries in the vicinity of Lake Chad, the lack of which led to border incidents in the past, has been completed and awaits ratification by Cameroon, Chad, Niger, and Nigeria.

| Country | Formal Relations Began | Notes |
|---|---|---|
| Burkina Faso | | Chad has an embassy in Ouagadougou. |
| Democratic Republic of the Congo | | Chad has an embassy in Kinshasa. |
| Egypt | | Chad has an embassy in Cairo.; Egypt has an embassy in N'Djamena. |
| Equatorial Guinea | | Chad has an embassy in Malabo. |
| Gabon | | Chad has an embassy in Libreville. |
| Kenya | | Chad is represented in Kenya through its embassy in Addis Ababa. |
| Libya | | See Chad-Libya relations Chadian-Libyan relations were ameliorated when Libyan-supported Idriss Déby unseated Habré on December 2. Gaddafi was the first head of state to recognize the new regime, and he also signed treaties of friendship and cooperation on various levels; but regarding the Aouzou Strip Déby followed his predecessor, declaring that if necessary he would fight to keep the strip out of Libya's hands. The Aouzou dispute was concluded for good on February 3, 1994, when the judges of the ICJ by a majority of 16 to 1 decided that the Aouzou Strip belonged to Chad. The court's judgement was implemented without delay, the two parties signing as early as April 4 an agreement concerning the practical modalities for the implementation of the judgement. Monitored by international observers, the withdrawal of Libyan troops from the Strip began on April 15 and was completed by May 10. The formal and final transfer of the Strip from Libya to Chad took place on May 30, when the sides signed a joint declaration stating that the Libyan withdrawal had been effected.: Chad has an embassy in Tripoli.; Libya has an embassy in N'Djamena. |
| Mali | | Chad has an embassy in Bamako. |
| Morocco | | Chad has an embassy in Rabat.; Morocco has an embassy in N'Djamena. |
| Mozambique | | The two countries maintain diplomatic relations and Idriss Déby visited Mozambique in November 2016. |
| Niger | | Chad has an embassy in Niamey. |
| Nigeria | | See Chad-Nigeria relations Nigeria's 1983 economic austerity campaign produced strains with neighboring states, including Chad. Nigeria expelled several hundred thousand foreign workers, mostly from its oil industry, which faced drastic cuts as a result of declining world oil prices. At least 30,000 of those expelled were Chadians. Despite these strains, however, Nigerians had assisted in the halting process of achieving stability in Chad, and both nations reaffirmed their intention to maintain close ties.: Chad has an embassy in Abuja and a consulate in Maiduguri.; Nigeria has an embassy in N'Djamena. |
| Senegal | | Chad has an embassy in Dakar. |
| Sudan | 15 March 1961 | See Chad-Sudan relations Both countries established diplomatic relations on 15 March 1961 On December 24, 2005, Chad declared itself as in a "state of belligerance" with neighboring Sudan. The conflict in the border region of Darfur has become an increasingly bi-national affair as increasing numbers of Sudanese flee to refugee camps in Chad, and Sudanese government troops and militias cross the borders to strike at both these camps and specific ethnic groups. Although the Government of Chad and the Government of Sudan signed the Tripoli Agreement on February 8, 2006, officially ending hostilities, fighting continues. On August 11, 2006, Chad and Sudan resumed relations at the behest of Libyan leader Muammar Gaddafi. Chad broke diplomatic relations with Sudan at least twice in 2006 because it believed the Sudanese government was supporting Janjaweed and UFDC rebels financially and with arms. Two accords were signed, the Tripoli Accord, which was signed on February 8 and failed to end the fighting, and the more recently signed N'Djamena Agreement. On May 11, 2008, Sudan announced it was cutting diplomatic relations with Chad, claiming that it was helping rebels in Darfur to attack the Sudanese capital Khartoum.: Chad has an embassy in Khartoum and a consulate-general in Geneina.; Sudan has an embassy in N'Djamena. |
| Zambia | | Zambia is represented in Chad through its embassy in Abuja, Nigeria. |

=== Americas ===
| Country | Formal Relations Began | Notes |
|---|---|---|
| Brazil | 8 October 1996 | Both countries established diplomatic relations on 8 October 1996. In 2012, Chadian President Idriss Déby Itno paid a visit to Brazil.: Brazil is accredited to Chad from its embassy in Yaoundé, Cameroon.; Chad is accredited to Brazil from its embassy in Washington, D.C., United States. |
| Canada | February 1962 | Both countries established diplomatic relations in February 1962: Canada is accredited to Chad from its high commission in Yaoundé, Cameroon.; Chad has an embassy in Ottawa. |
| Cuba | 9 June 1976 | Both countries established diplomatic relations on 9 June 1976: Chad is accredited to Cuba from its embassy in Washington, D.C., United States.; Cuba is accredited to Chad from its embassy in Niamey, Niger. |
| Mexico | 25 February 1976 | See Chad–Mexico relations Chad and Mexico established diplomatic relations on 25 February 1976. In May 2002, Chadian Prime Minister Nagoum Yamassoum paid a visit to the Mexican city of Monterrey to attend the Monterrey Consensus conference.: Chad is accredited to Mexico from its embassy in Washington, D.C., United States.; Mexico is accredited to Chad from its embassy in Cairo, Egypt. |
| United States | 11 August 1960 | See Chad–United States relations Both countries established diplomatic relations on 11 August 1960 Embassy of Chad in Washington, D.C. The US embassy in N'Djamena, established at Chadian independence in 1960, was closed from the onset of the heavy fighting in the city in 1980 until the withdrawal of the Libyan forces at the end of 1981. It was reopened in January 1982. The U.S. Agency for International Development (USAID) and the U.S. Information Service (USIS) offices resumed activities in Chad in September 1983. The United States Department of State issued a travel advisory to U.S. citizens in 2009, recommending that citizens not affiliated with humanitarian efforts avoid all travel to eastern Chad and the Chad/Central African Republic border area due to insecurity caused by banditry, recent clashes between Chadian government and rebel forces, and political tension between Chad and Sudan. President Donald Trump issued a proclamation on September 24, 2017, suspending the entry of Chadian nationals to the United States. The proclamation claims that the government of Chad "does not adequately share public-safety and terrorism-related information..." On April 10, 2018, the US Government lifted travel restrictions on Chad.: Chad has an embassy in Washington, DC.; United States has an embassy in N'djamena. |

=== Asia ===
Despite centuries-old cultural ties to the Arab World, the Chadian Government maintained few significant ties to Arab states in North Africa or West Asia in the 1980s. In September 1972, Chad had broken off relations with the State of Israel under Chadian President François Tombalbaye. President Habré hoped to pursue closer relations with Arab states as a potential opportunity to break out of Chad's post-imperial dependence on France, and to assert Chad's unwillingness to serve as an arena for superpower rivalries. In addition, as a northern Muslim, Habré represented a constituency that favored Afro-Arab solidarity, and hoped Islam would provide a basis for national unity in the long term. For these reasons, he was expected to seize opportunities during the 1990s to pursue closer ties with the Arab World. In 1988, Chad recognized the State of Palestine, which maintains a mission in N'Djamena. In November 2018, President Deby visited Israel and announced his intention to restore diplomatic relations. Chad and Israel re-established diplomatic relations in January 2019. In February 2023, Chad opened an embassy in Israel.

During the 1980s, Arab opinion on the Chadian–Libyan conflict over the Aouzou Strip was divided. Several Arab states supported Libyan territorial claims to the Strip, among the most outspoken of which was Algeria, which provided training for anti-Habré forces, although most recruits for its training programs were from Nigeria or Cameroon, recruited and flown to Algeria by Libya. The Progressive Socialist Party of Lebanon also sent troops to support Muammar Gaddafi's efforts against Chad in 1987. In contrast, numerous other Arab states opposed the Libyan actions, and expressed their desire to see the dispute over the Aouzou Strip settled peacefully. By the end of 1987, Algiers and N'Djamena were negotiating to improve relations and Algeria helped mediate the end of the Aouzou Strip conflict.

| Country | Formal Relations Began | Notes |
|---|---|---|
| Brunei | | Chad is represented in Brunei through its embassy in Riyadh, Saudi Arabia. |
| China | 28 November 1972 | See Chad–China relations Both countries established diplomatic relations on 28 November 1972, but China severed diplomatic relations with Chad in 1997 when the country resumed diplomatic ties with Taiwan. According to a joint communique signed by the two countries when they resumed diplomatic ties starting from August 6, 2006, Chad recognized there is only one China in the world and Taiwan is an inalienable part of the Chinese territory: Chad has an embassy in Beijing.; China has an embassy in N'Djamena. |
| India | 18 October 1975 | See Chad–India relations Both countries established diplomatic relations on 18 October 1975: Chad has an embassy in New Delhi.; India has an embassy in N'Djamena. |
| Israel | 10 January 1961 | See Chad–Israel relations Both countries established diplomatic relations on 10 January 1961, but diplomatic relations were broken on 28 November 1972 and re-established on 20 January 2019 In November 2018, Chadian President Idriss Déby paid a visit to Israel. In January 2019 Israeli Prime Minister Benjamin Netanyahu paid a visit to Chad. During the visit, both nations re-established diplomatic relations since relations were cut in 1972. In February 2023, Chad opened an embassy in Israel.: Chad has an embassy in Tel Aviv.; Israel is accredited to Chad from its embassy in Dakar, Senegal |
| Malaysia | | Malaysia is represented in Chad through its High Commission in Abuja, Nigeria. |
| Pakistan | | Pakistan is represented in Chad through its embassy in Sudan. |
| State of Palestine | | The State of Palestine is represented in Chad through its embassy in Bamako, Mali. |
| Taiwan | | See Chad–Taiwan relations Chad and Taiwan had relations from 1962 to 1972 when Chad first switched diplomatic recognition to the People's Republic of China. Chad then reestablished bilateral ties with Taiwan from 1997 to 2006. Since August 2006, Chad has granted diplomatic recognition to China. |
| Turkey | 27 January 1970 | See Chad–Turkey relations Both countries established diplomatic relations on 27 January 1970: Chad has an embassy in Ankara.; Turkey has an embassy in N'Djamena.; Trade volume between the two countries was US$72.4 million in 2019 (Chadian exports/imports: 32.5/39.9 million USD).; There are direct flights from Istanbul to N'Djamena since December 12, 2013. |
| United Arab Emirates | 7 April 1973 | Both countries established diplomatic relations on 7 April 1973: Chad has an embassy in Abu Dhabi and a consulate-general in Dubai.; UAE has an embassy in N'Djamena.; UAE opened coordination office for foreign aid in Chad in August 2023. |

=== Europe ===
Chad is officially non-aligned but maintains close relations with France, its former colonial power, which has about 1,200 troops stationed in the capital N'Djamena. It receives economic aid from countries of the European Community, the United States, and various international organizations. Libya supplies aid and has an ambassador resident in N'Djamena. Traditionally strong ties with the Western community have weakened over the past two years due to a dispute between the Government of Chad and the World Bank over how the profits from Chad's petroleum reserves are allocated. Although oil output to the West has resumed and the dispute has officially been resolved, resentment towards what the Déby administration considered "foreign meddling" lingers.

| Country | Formal Relations Began | Notes |
|---|---|---|
| Austria | | Austria is represented in Chad through its embassy in Abuja, Nigeria. |
| Denmark | | Denmark is represented in Chad through its embassy in Ouagadougou, Burkina Faso. |
| France | 12 August 1960 | See Chad–France relations Both countries established diplomatic relations on 12 August 1960 France was Chad's most important foreign donor and patron for the first three decades following independence in 1960. At the end of the 1980s, economic ties were still strong, and France provided development assistance in the form of loans and grants. It was no longer Chad's leading customer for agricultural exports, but it continued to provide substantial military support. Chad remained a member of the African Financial Community, which linked the value of its currency, the CFA franc, to the French franc. French private and government investors owned a substantial portion of Chad's industrial and financial institutions, and the French treasury backed the Bank of Central African States, which served as the central bank for Chad and six other member nations. Chad's dependence on France declined slightly during Habré's tenure as president, in part because other foreign donors and investors returned as the war subsided and also because increased rainfall since 1985 improved food production. French official attitudes toward Chad had changed from the 1970s policies under the leadership of Giscard d'Estaing to those of the Mitterrand era of the 1980s. Economic, political, and strategic goals, which had emphasized maintaining French influence in Africa, exploiting Chad's natural resources, and bolstering francophone Africa's status as a bulwark against the spread of Soviet influence, had been replaced by nominally anticolonialist attitudes. The election in France of the Socialist government in 1981 had coincided with conditions of near-anarchy in Chad, leading France's Socialist Party to reaffirm its ideological stance against high-profile intervention in Africa. Hoping to avoid a confrontation with Libya, another important client state in the region, President Mitterrand limited French military involvement to a defense of the region surrounding N'Djamena in 1983 and 1984. Then, gradually increasing its commitment to reinforce Habré's presidency, France once again increased its military activity in Chad. In 2024, Chad breaks its defense agreements with France, dating from 1966.: Chad has an embassy in Paris.; France has an embassy in N'djamena. |
| Netherlands | 7 May 1962 | See Chad–Netherlands relations Both countries established diplomatic relations on 7 May 1962 when accredited first Ambassador of Netherlands to Chad (resident in Leopoldville): Chad is accredited to Netherlands from its embassy in Brussels, Belgium.; Netherlands is accredited to Chad from its embassy in Khartoum, Sudan. |
| Romania | 15 July 1969 | See Chad–Romania relations Chad–Romania relations were established on July 15, 1969. However, neither country has an embassy in the other's capital, and although an agreement on trade was signed in 1969, followed by an agreement on economic and technical cooperation in 1971, as of 2007, the volume of bilateral trade remained insignificant. In November 2007, Romania announced that they would deploy 120 troops to Chad and the Central African Republic in connection with a European Union peacekeeping mission there. Romania continued to condemn violence in Chad and blamed it on rebel groups. However, by mid-2008, Romanian defence minister Teodor Meleşcanu indicated that his country would not send further troops to the mission in Chad, stating that they had reached their limits and did not want involvement in a war theatre. Chad and Romania have almost identical flags. |
| United Kingdom | 9 December 1960 | See Foreign relations of the United Kingdom Chad established diplomatic relations with the UK on 9 December 1960.: Chad does not maintain an embassy in the UK.; The United Kingdom is accredited to Chad through its embassy in N'Djamena.; Both countries share common membership of the International Criminal Court, and the World Trade Organization. Bilaterally the two countries have a Development Partnership. |

=== Oceania ===
| Country | Formal Relations Began | Notes |
|---|---|---|
| Australia | | Australia is represented in Chad through its embassy in Paris, France. |

== Membership of international organizations ==
Chad belongs to the following international organizations:

- United Nations and some of its specialized and related agencies
- African Union (suspended)
- Central African Customs and Economic Union (UDEAC)
- African Financial Community (Franc Zone)
- Agency for the Francophone Community
- African, Caribbean and Pacific Group of States
- African Development Bank
- Central African States Development Bank
- Economic and Monetary Union of Central African (CEMAC)
- Economic Commission for Africa; G-77
- International Civil Aviation Organization
- International Red Cross and Red Crescent Movement
- International Development Association
- Islamic Development Bank
- International Fund for Agricultural Development
- International Finance Corporation
- International Federation of the Red Cross and Red Crescent Societies
- International Labour Organization
- International Monetary Fund
- Intelsat
- Interpol
- International Olympic Committee
- International Telecommunication Union
- International Trade Union Confederation
- NAM
- Organisation of Islamic Cooperation
- Organisation for the Prohibition of Chemical Weapons
- Universal Postal Union
- World Confederation of Labour
- World Intellectual Property Organization
- World Meteorological Organization
- World Tourism Organization
- World Trade Organization

== See also ==
- List of diplomatic missions in Chad
- List of diplomatic missions of Chad
