= List of diplomatic missions of Chad =

This is a list of diplomatic missions of Chad, excluding honorary consulates.

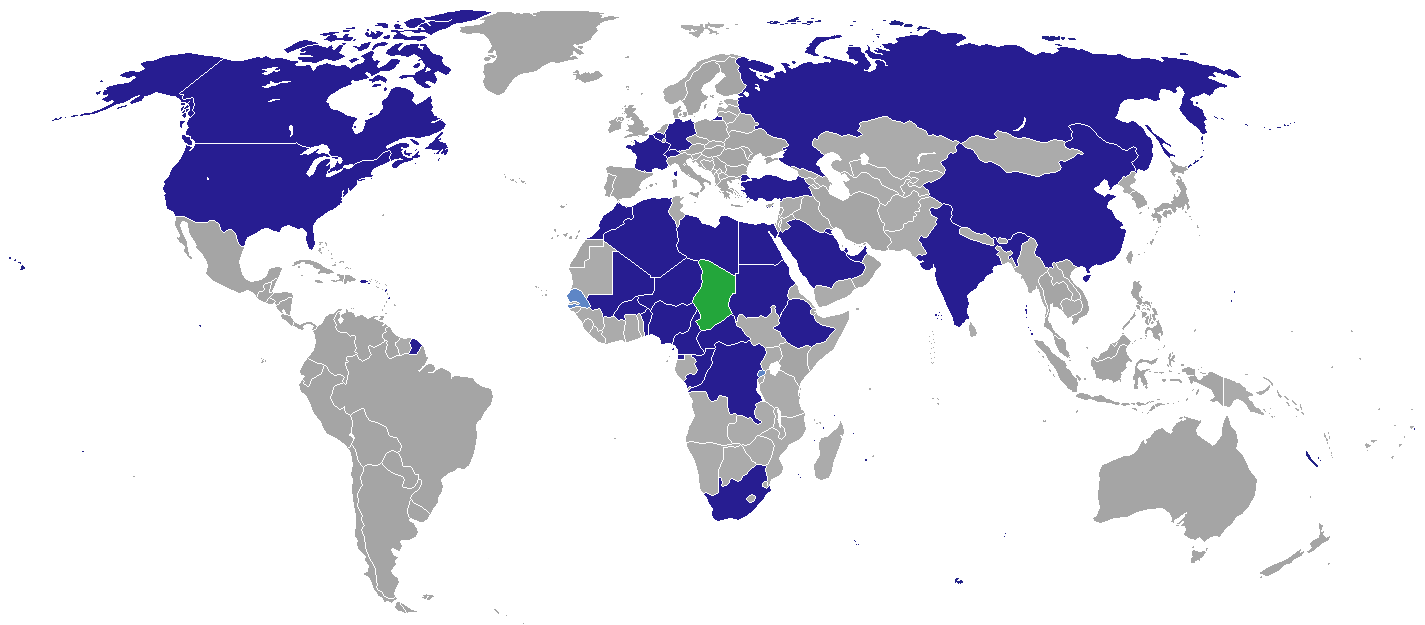
Map of diplomatic missions of Chad

== Current missions ==
=== Africa ===
Host country	Host city	Mission	Concurrent accreditation	Ref.
Algeria	Algiers	Embassy	Countries: Tunisia	
Benin	Cotonou	Embassy (Note: Originally a consulate-general; was elevated into an embassy in 2026.)	Countries: Ghana; Ivory Coast; Togo	
Burkina Faso	Ouagadougou	Embassy		
Cameroon	Yaoundé	Embassy		
Cameroon	Douala	Consulate-General		
Cameroon	Garoua	Consulate		
Central African Republic	Bangui	Embassy		
Congo-Brazzaville	Brazzaville	Embassy	Countries: Burundi; Rwanda	
Congo-Kinshasa	Kinshasa	Embassy	Countries: Angola; Zambia	
Egypt	Cairo	Embassy	Countries: Cyprus	
Equatorial Guinea	Malabo	Embassy	Countries: Gabon	
Ethiopia	Addis Ababa	Embassy	Countries: Kenya; Multilateral Organizations: African Union	
Libya	Tripoli	Embassy		
Libya	Benghazi	Consulate-General		
Libya	Kufra	Consulate-General		
Mali	Bamako	Embassy		
Morocco	Rabat	Embassy		
Morocco	Dakhla	Consulate-General		
Niger	Niamey	Embassy	Countries: Mauritania	
Nigeria	Abuja	Embassy		
Nigeria	Maiduguri	Consulate		
Rwanda	Kigali	Consulate-General (Note: Subordinate to the embassy in Brazzaville.)		
Senegal	Dakar	Consulate-General		
South Africa	Pretoria	Embassy	Countries: Botswana; Comoros; Eswatini; Lesotho; Madagascar; Malawi; Mozambique; Namibia; Seychelles; Zimbabwe	
Sudan	Khartoum	Embassy		
Sudan	Geneina	Consulate-General		

=== Americas ===
Host country	Host city	Mission	Concurrent accreditation	Ref.
Canada	Ottawa	Embassy		
United States	Washington, D.C.	Embassy	Countries: Brazil; Cuba; Mexico	

=== Asia ===
Host country	Host city	Mission	Concurrent accreditation	Ref.
China	Beijing	Embassy	Countries: Cambodia; Indonesia; Japan; Laos; Malaysia; Mongolia; Myanmar; Philippines; Singapore; South Korea; Thailand; Timor-Leste; Vietnam	
India	New Delhi	Embassy	Countries: Afghanistan; Bangladesh; Nepal; Sri Lanka	
Kuwait	Kuwait City	Embassy		
Qatar	Doha	Embassy		
Saudi Arabia	Riyadh	Embassy	Countries: Bahrain	
Saudi Arabia	Jeddah	Consulate-General	Countries: Bahrain	
Turkey	Ankara	Embassy	Countries: Azerbaijan	
United Arab Emirates	Abu Dhabi	Embassy		
United Arab Emirates	Dubai	Consulate-General		

=== Europe ===
Host country	Host city	Mission	Concurrent accreditation	Ref.
Belgium	Brussels	Embassy	Countries: Luxembourg; Netherlands; International Organizations: European Union; Organisation of African, Caribbean and Pacific States	
France	Paris	Embassy	Countries: Greece; Holy See; Portugal; Spain; United Kingdom; International Organizations: Francophonie; UNESCO	
Germany	Berlin	Embassy	Countries: Austria; Czechia; Hungary; Italy; Liechtenstein; Lithuania; Poland; Romania; Slovakia; Ukraine	
Russia	Moscow	Embassy	Countries: Belarus; Kazakhstan; Latvia; Tajikistan; Turkmenistan	

=== Multilateral organizations ===
Organization	Host city	Host country	Mission	Concurrent accreditation	Ref.
United Nations	Geneva	Switzerland	Permanent Mission	Countries: Switzerland	
United Nations	New York City	United States	Permanent Mission		

== Gallery ==
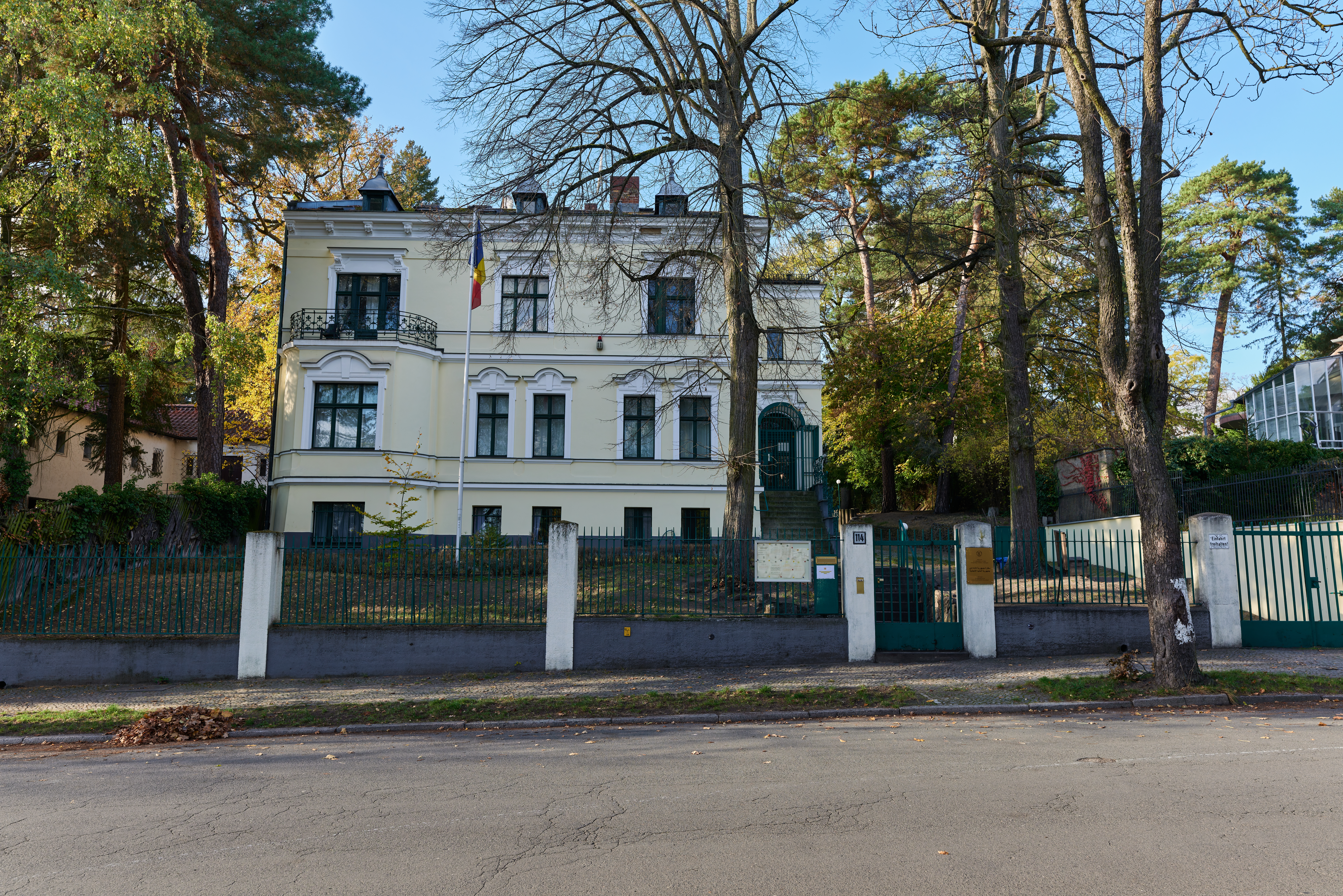
Embassy in Berlin

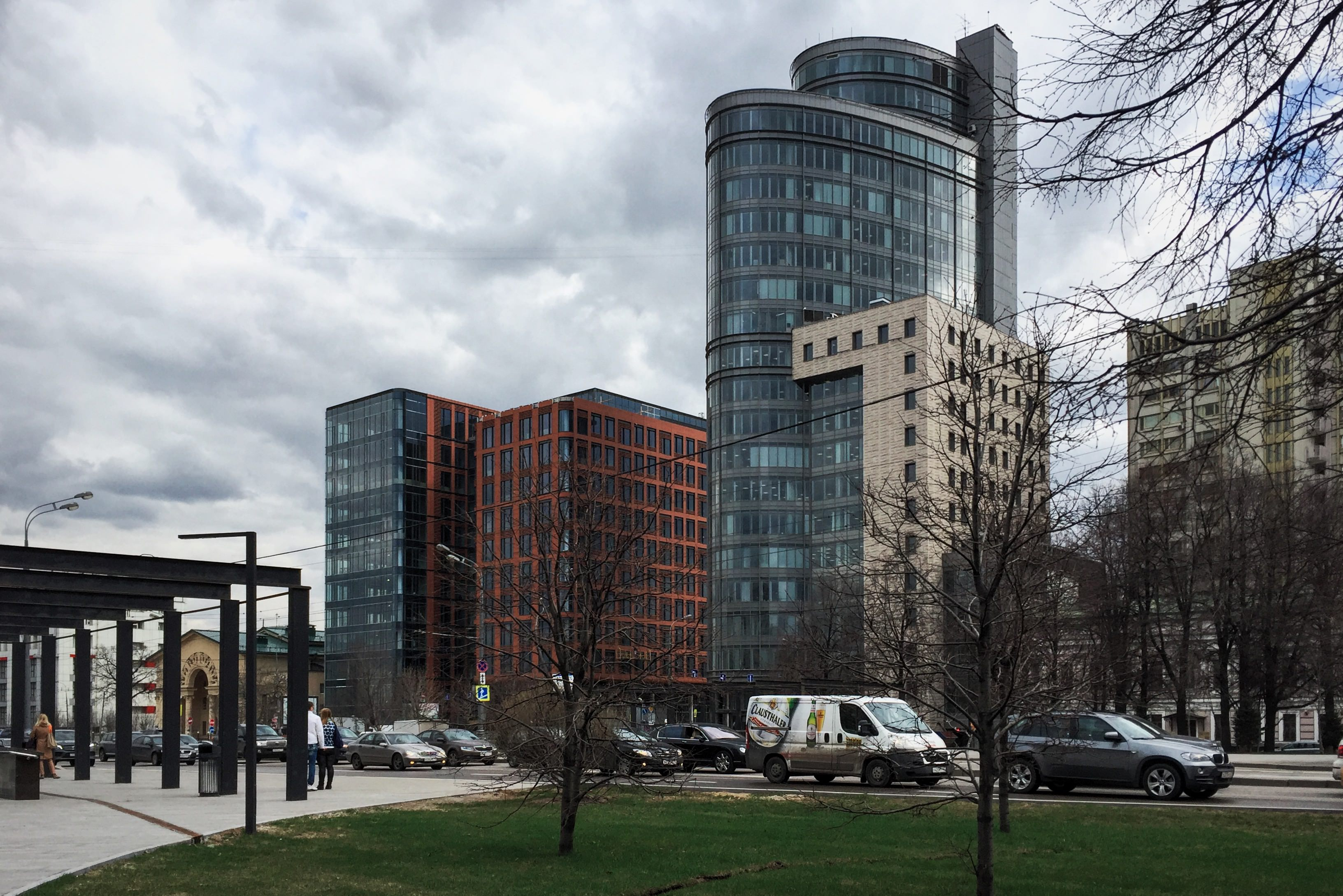
Embassy in Moscow

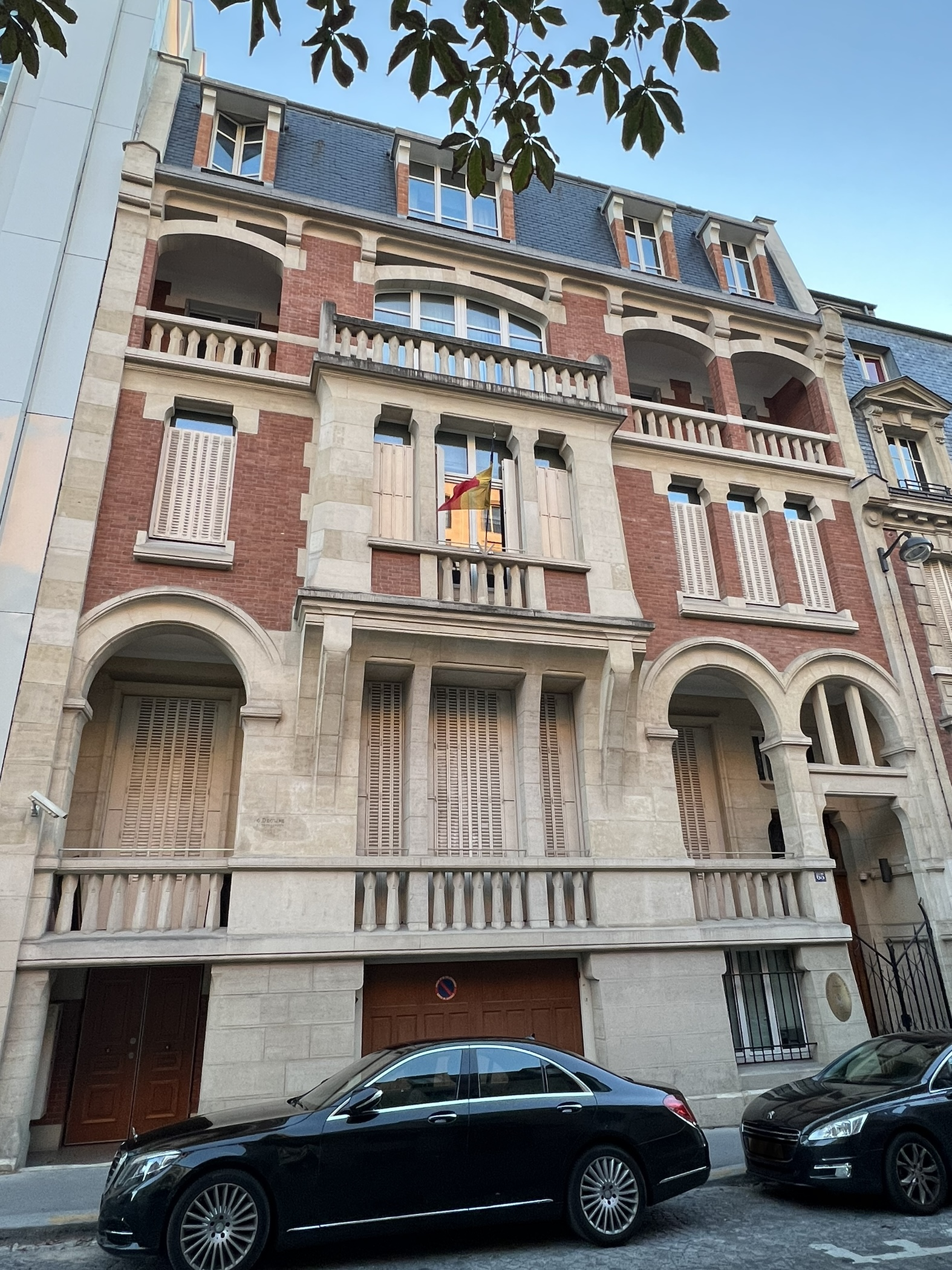
Embassy in Paris

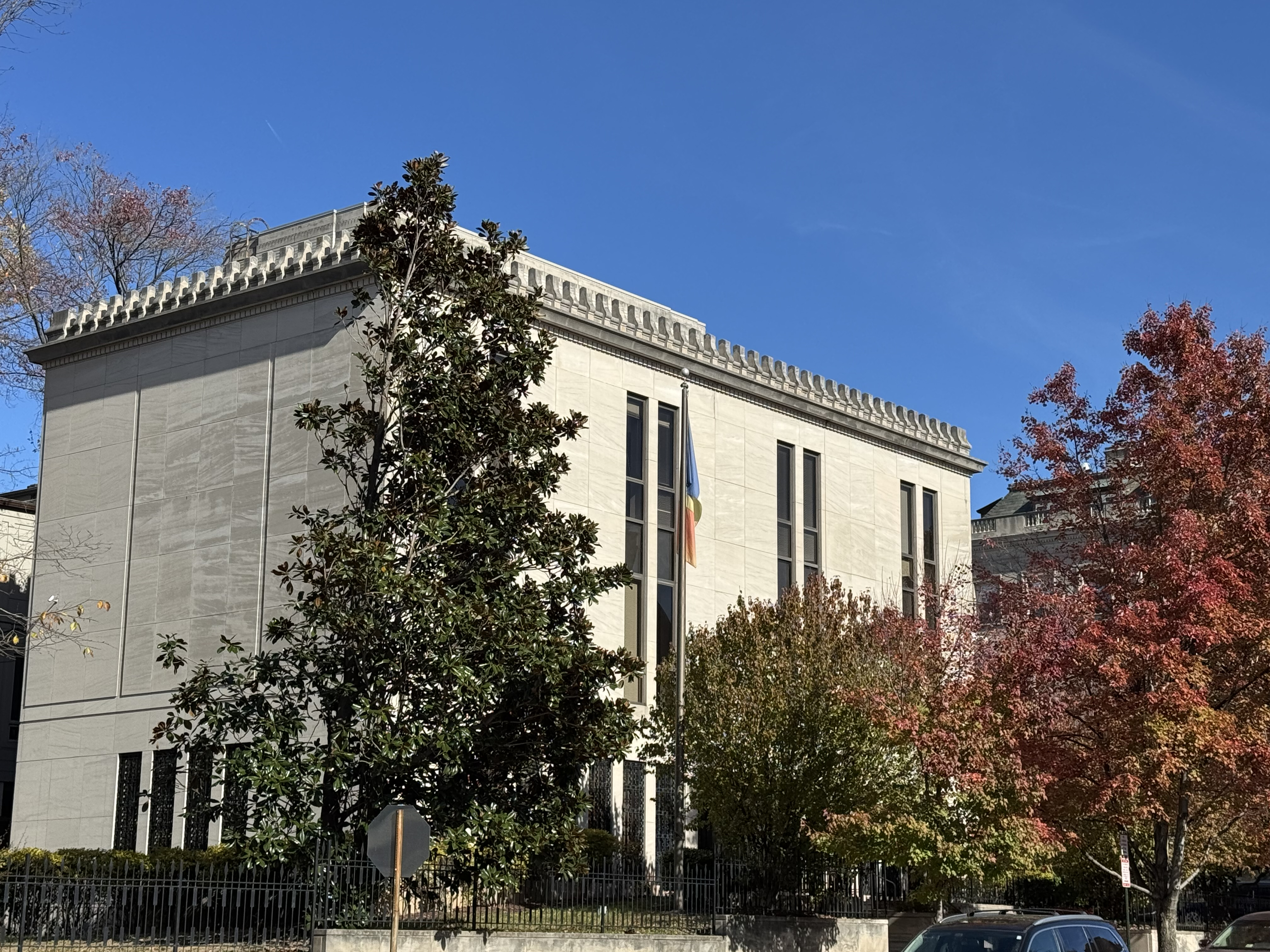
Embassy in Washington, D.C.

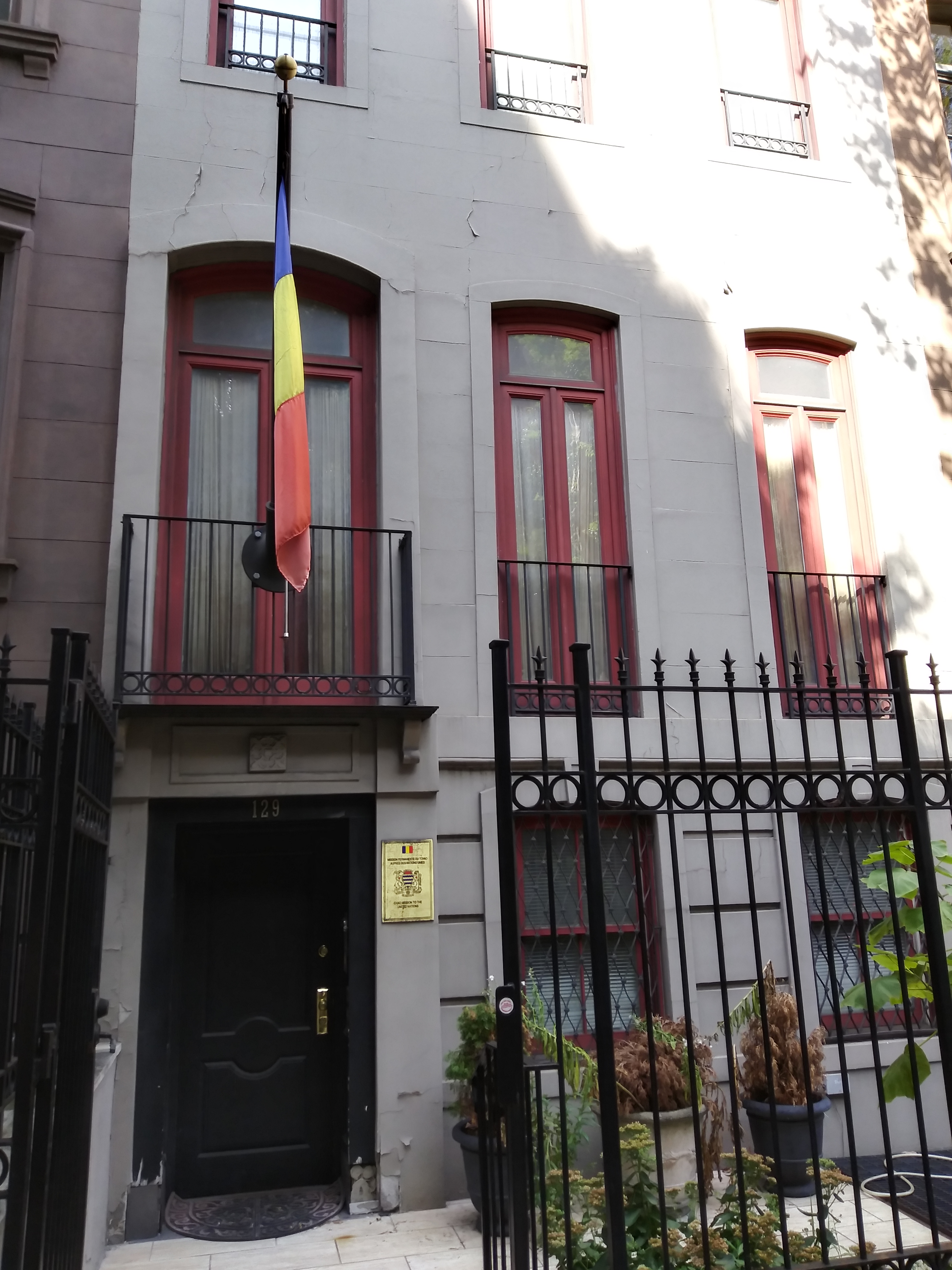
Permanent Mission to the U.N in New York City

== Closed missions ==
=== Africa ===
Host country	Host city	Mission	Year closed	Ref.
Gabon	Libreville	Embassy	2025	
Ivory Coast	Abidjan	Embassy	2026	

=== Asia ===
Host country	Host city	Mission	Year closed	Ref.
Israel	Tel Aviv	Embassy	2025	
Turkey	Istanbul	Consulate-General	2025	

== See also ==
- Foreign relations of Chad
- List of diplomatic missions in Chad
- Visa policy of Chad
