= Chad–Nigeria border =

International border

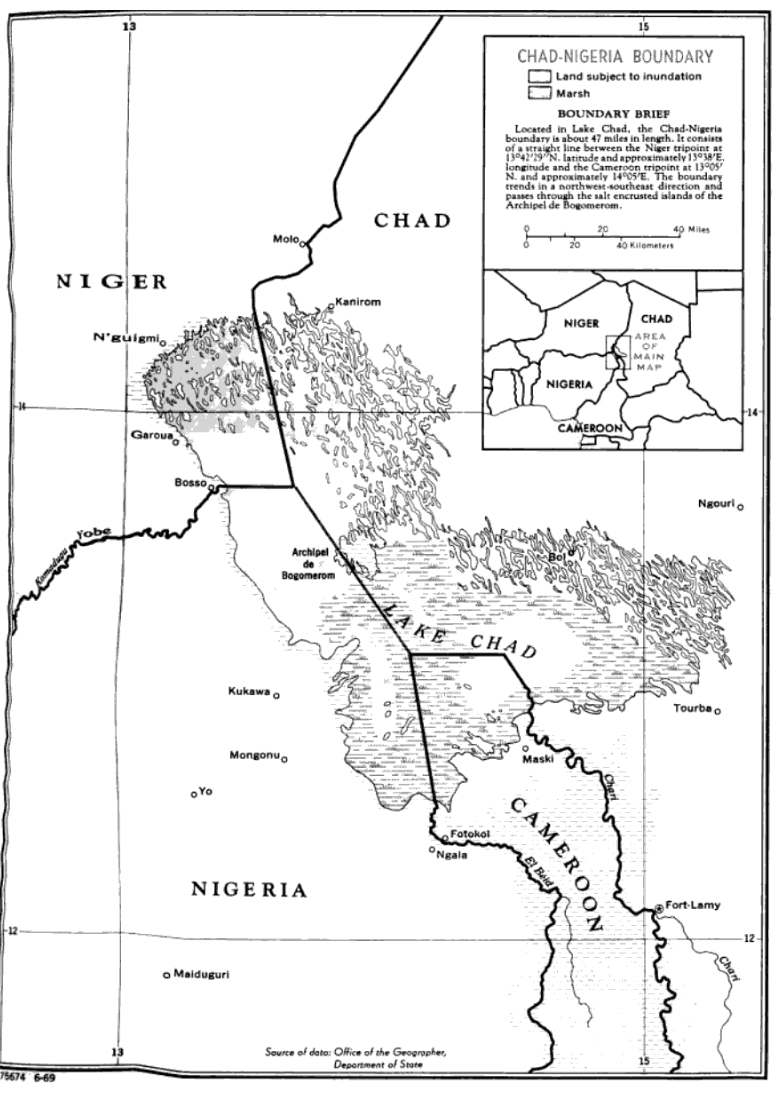
Map of the Chad-Nigeria border

The Chad–Nigeria border is 85 km (53 mi) in length and consists of a single diagonal line running NW to SE from the tripoint with Niger in the north to the tripoint with Cameroon in the south.

== Description ==
This short boundary consists of a single straight line connecting Chad and Nigeria's tripoints with Niger and Cameroon. The entire boundary formerly lay entirely in Lake Chad, however given the dramatic decrease in the lake's size over the past several decades most of the boundary now run across land, swamp and intermittent exposed islands in the lake.

== History ==
The border first emerged during the Scramble for Africa, a period of intense competition between European powers in the later 19th century for territory and influence in Africa. The process culminated in the Berlin Conference of 1884, in which the European nations concerned agreed upon their respective territorial claims and the rules of engagements going forward. As a result of this France gained control of the upper valley of the Niger River (roughly equivalent to the areas of modern Mali and Niger), and also the lands explored by Pierre Savorgnan de Brazza for France in Central Africa (roughly equivalent to modern Gabon and Congo-Brazzaville). Meanwhile, Britain, which had (via the Royal Niger Company) administered the area around Lagos since 1861 and the Oil River Protectorate (Calabar are the surrounding area) since 1884, would have priority in the areas south of the upper Niger region. From their respective bases both nations gradually extended their rule into the interior. The French eventually linked their holdings following expeditions in April 1900 which met at Kousséri in the far north of modern Cameroon. These newly conquered regions were initially ruled as military territories, with the two areas later organised into the federal colonies of French West Africa (Afrique occidentale française, abbreviated AOF) and French Equatorial Africa (Afrique équatoriale française, AEF). The British likewise extended their rule inward from their Lagos and Calabar bases, forming two additional colonies - the Southern Nigeria Protectorate and the Northern Nigeria Protectorate. In 1900 rule of these areas was transferred to the British government, with the Northern and Southern (including Lagos and Calabar) protectorates united as the colony of Nigeria in 1914. The modern Chad–Nigeria border arose largely as a secondary result of other border negotiations in the region: Anglo-German agreement s in 1893 and 1906-07 agreed that the border between Britain's Nigerian colonies and German Cameroon would extend into Lake Chad; Anglo-French agreements in 1898, 1904, 1906 and 1910 extended the AOF-Northern Nigeria border into the lake; and a Franco-German border treaty of 1908 extended the AEF-Cameroon border into the lake. After the two tripoints were delimited more definitely (Chad-Niger-Nigeria in 1910-12 and Chad-Cameroon-Nigeria in 1931) the border became fixed as a straight line connecting these two points.

France gradually granted more political rights and representation for the constituent territories of their two African federations, culminating in the granting of broad internal autonomy to each colony in 1958 within the framework of the French Community. Eventually, Chad gained full independence in August 1960, with Nigeria likewise declaring independence in October 1960, and thus their mutual frontier became an international one between two independent states. At a conference of the Lake Chad Basin states held in N'Djamena in December 1962 it was agreed to respect the existing boundaries within the lake. Since then the lake has decreased dramatically in size, and much if not all of the Chad–Nigeria border now runs over land, creating problems with border management and demarcation. In 1983 disputes between Chad and Nigeria over their mutual border escalated into fighting, after Nigeria sent troops to the area citing harassment of Nigerian fishers by Chadian elements, resulting in the deaths of 75 Chadian and nine Nigerian soldiers. In more recent years many thousands of refugees have crossed the border due to the ongoing Boko Haram insurgency in north-eastern Nigeria.

== See also ==
- Chad-Nigeria relations
