= American International School of N'Djamena =

- N'Djamena, Chad

Information
- School type: Independent school
- Closed: 2008
- Head teacher: Gary Mickle
- Grades: P-8
- Gender: Co-Educational
- Age: 5 to 14
- Enrollment: 35
- Education system: American Curriculum
- Language: English

The American International School of N'Djamena (AISN) was a small international school in the Chadian capital, N'Djamena. It was an independent coeducational day school which offered an American-style educational program from prekindergarten through grade 8. The school was a non-profit association, governed by a six-member School Board composed of four AISN parents elected by the association, and two representatives of the U.S. Embassy. In 2008, the school shut down in fear of impending war.

At the beginning of the 2004–2005 school year, enrollment was 35, with seven full-time and three part-time professional staff members.

== Curriculum ==
The curriculum is that of U.S. academic Pre-K – 8 schools. AISN graduates are prepared for further study at U.S. or other American-style international college preparatory schools. Instruction is offered primarily in English. A dual French program is also offered, which serves the needs of "Native French Speaking" (NFS) students and "French as a Foreign Language" (FSL) students separately.

== Facilities ==
The school is located in the "Esso" neighborhood of N'Djamena. In addition to seven classrooms and two administrative offices, there is outdoor sports equipment including badminton and volleyball nets and equipment, a basketball court, soccer goal, and a tetherball set, a playground with two jungle gyms, a 2,000-volume library and a snack-bar/recreation room. All indoor facilities are air conditioned.

== Finances ==
School income derives primarily from tuition and related fees. In addition, there is a once-only capital levy.

== See also ==
- Chad–United States relations
- Education in Chad
- List of international schools

== Sources ==
This article was adapted from a report by the United States Department of State, released on December 20, 2004. The report is in the public domain, and can be found here.
