= Chad–Israel relations =

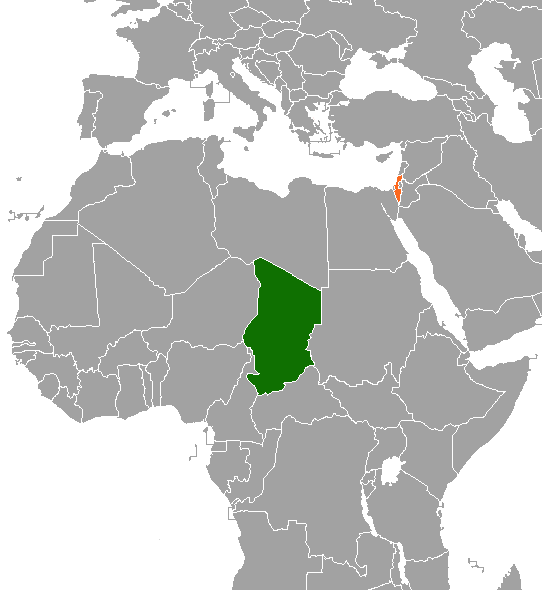
- Chad: Israel

Chad and Israel began relations with Chad's independence in 1960, but were officially terminated in the 1970s. De facto relations resumed in 2016, with diplomatic relations re-established in 2019.

== History ==
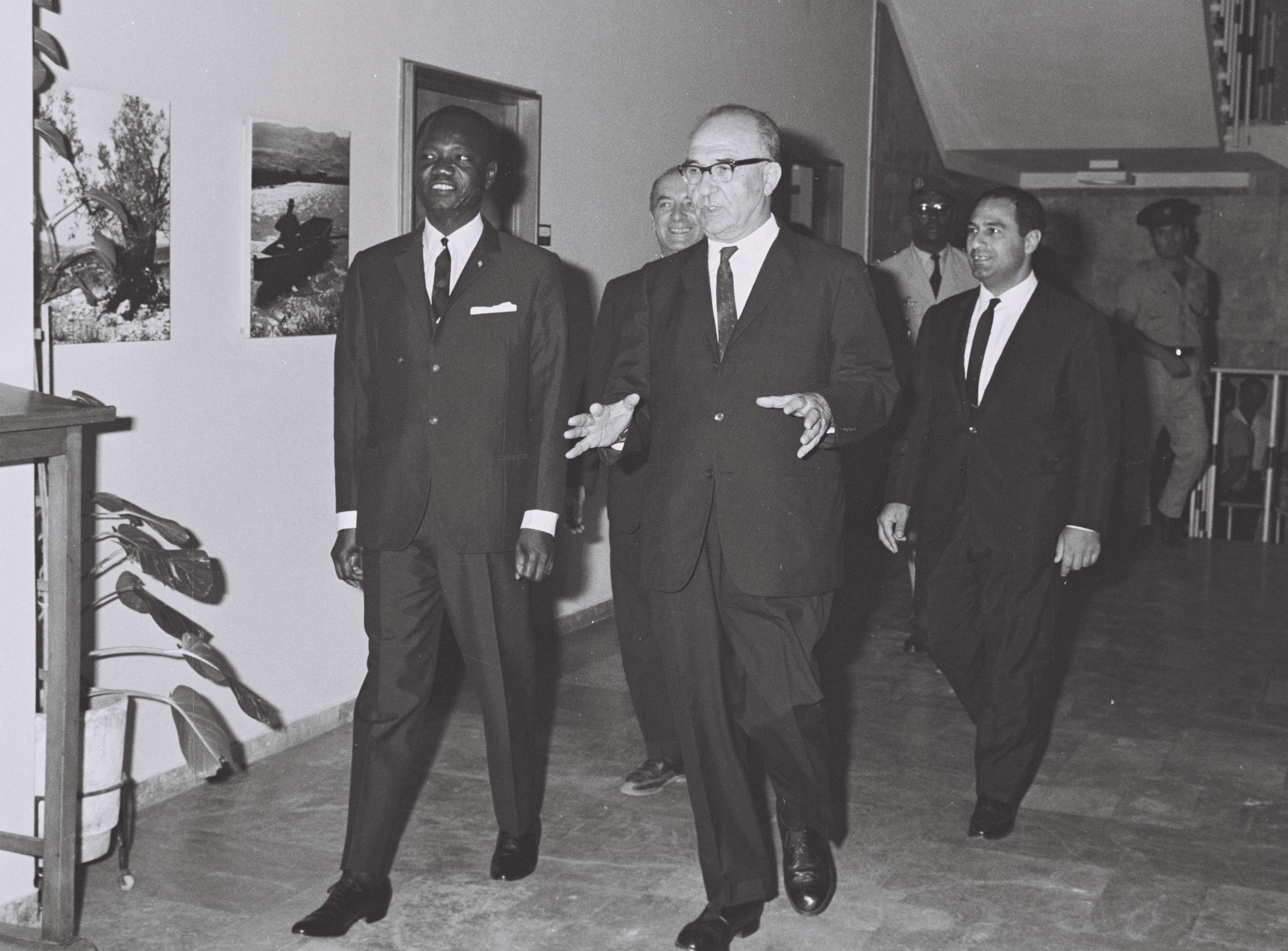
Chadian president François Tombalbaye and Israeli prime minister Levi Eshkol in 1965

In 1960, Israel recognised Chad when Chad attained independence from France. On 10 January 1961, Chad and Israel established diplomatic relations. In 1962, Israel opened a resident embassy in Fort-Lamy. Initially, both states maintained friendly relations. In 1965, Chadian president François Tombalbaye paid an official visit to Israel.

On 28 November 1972, Chad announced it was terminating its relations with Israel. Chad was the second of twenty-two African nations that ended relations with Israel in 1972 and 1973.

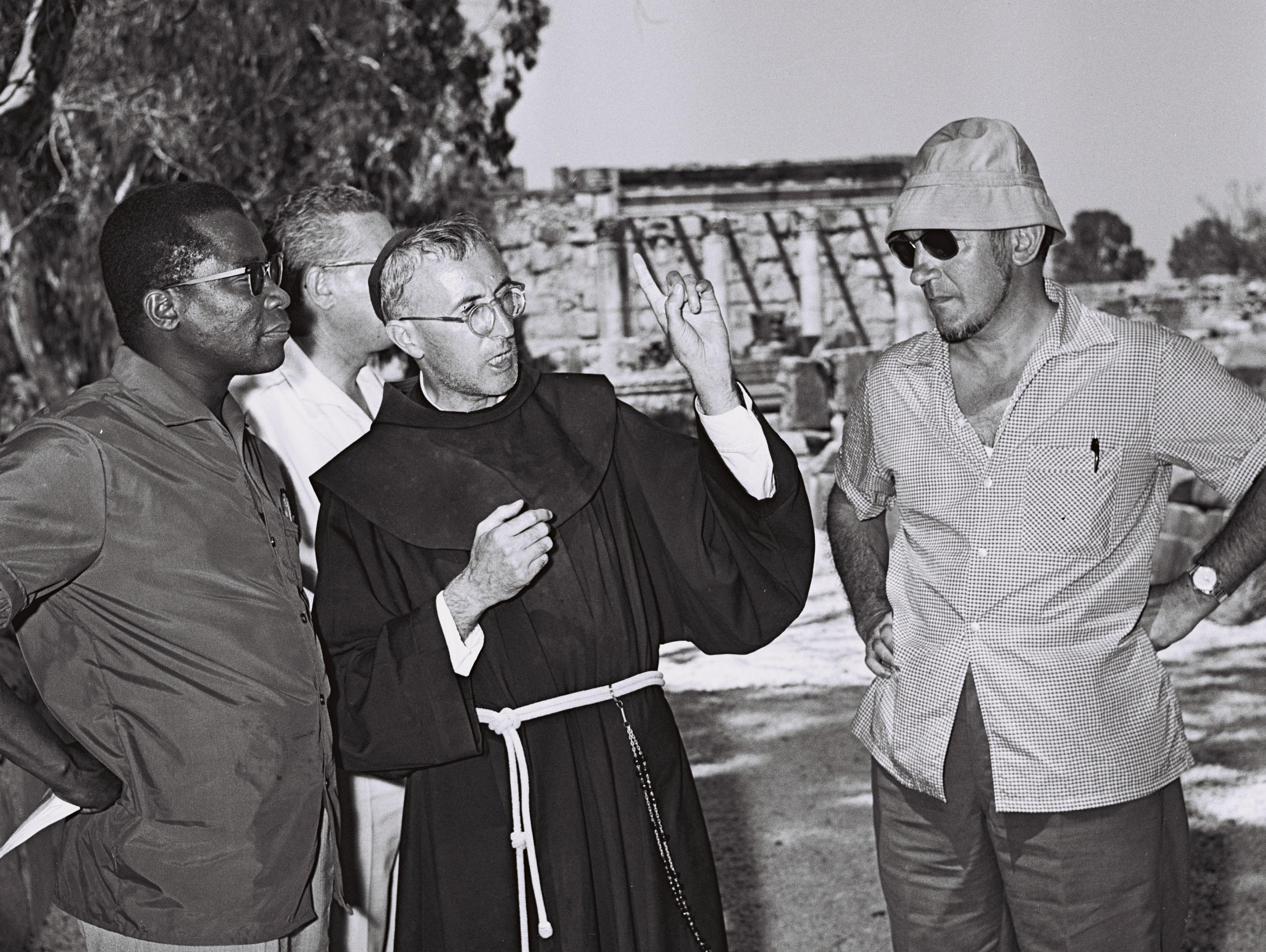
Gabriel Lisette visiting Capernaum

Although Chad and Israel did not have formal diplomatic relations, informal relations continued. Israel reportedly sold weapons to the Chadian government to aid them during the Chadian Civil War. More recently, Israel has provided weapons and funds to Chad to assist the country's fight against rebels in the north.

In July 2016, the director-general of the Israeli Foreign Ministry Dore Gold met Chadian president Idriss Déby at the presidential palace in the city of Fada, in northern Chad. In November 2018, Déby arrived in Israel and paid an official visit to the country. During his visit, Déby met with Israeli prime minister Benjamin Netanyahu and President Reuven Rivlin. Both nations expressed their intentions to re-establish diplomatic relations and discussed plans for Netanyahu to pay an official visit to Chad.

In January 2019, Netanyahu arrived in the Chadian capital of N'Djamena where he met with Déby. Diplomatic relations were restored between both nations and several bilateral agreements were signed. Details of the trade deals agreed upon were not released by Chadian security. Sources have claimed that supplies of Israeli weapons have been secured for use in fighting Islamist rebels in the north of the country. Netanyahu described the agreement as a historic moment for the two countries. Jerusalem Post correspondent Herb Keinon argues that Chad will benefit from closer security, intelligence and technology ties to Israel and improved access to the United States, a key Israeli ally.

On February 1, 2023, Chad announced that it would establish an embassy in Ramat Gan, in a move defined as a significant warm-up in bilateral relations. Chadian president Mahamat Deby visited Israel on February 2, 2023, to open the embassy. Israeli officials said they have no plans to open an embassy in Chad and will run contacts with Chad out of the Israeli embassy in Senegal.

On 5 November 2023, Chad recalled its ambassador to Israel, accusing the country of creating an unprecedented humanitarian catastrophe and killing innocent people in Gaza. In September 2025, Chad closed its embassy in Israel due to financial restraints, however, stated that the closure of the embassy in Israel would not affect diplomatic relations between the two countries.

== See also ==
- Foreign relations of Chad
- Foreign relations of Israel
