= Chad–Romania relations =

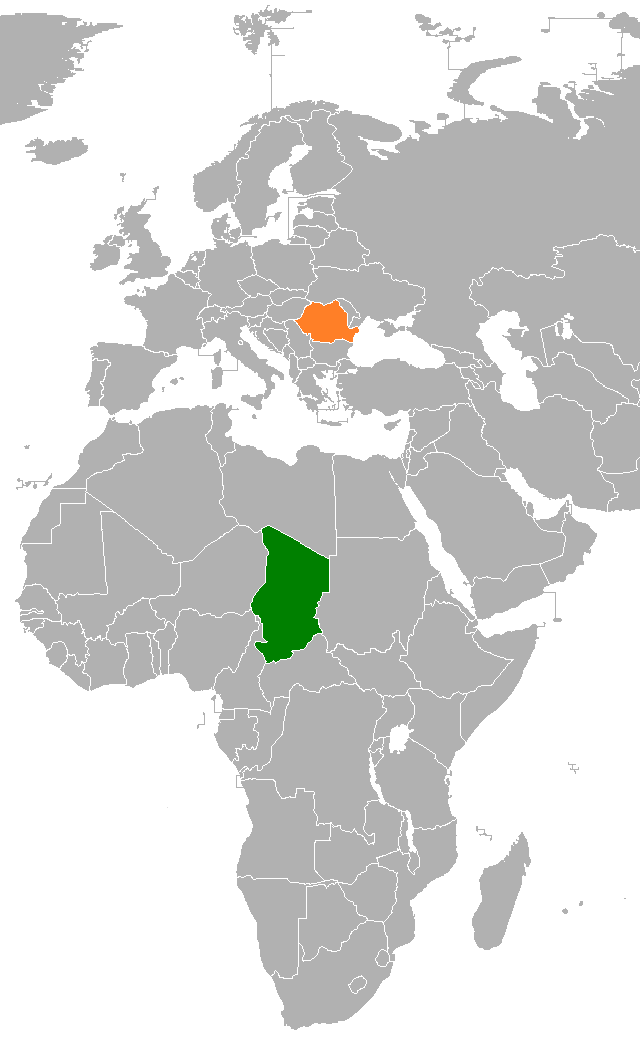
- Chad: Romania

Chad–Romania relations refers to bilateral relations between Chad and Romania. Diplomatic relations were established on 15 July 1969. Chad is represented in Romania through its embassy in Berlin, Germany. Romania is represented in Chad through its embassy in Algiers, Algeria.

== Agreements ==
An agreement on trade was signed in 1969, followed by an agreement on economic and technical cooperation in 1971. As of 2007, the volume of bilateral trade remained insignificant.

== History ==
In November 2007, Romania announced that they would deploy 120 troops to Chad and the Central African Republic in connection with a European Union peacekeeping mission there. Romania continued to condemn violence in Chad and blamed it on rebel groups. However, by mid-2008, Romanian defence minister Teodor Meleșcanu indicated that his country would not send further troops to the mission in Chad, stating that they had reached their limits and did not want involvement in a war theatre.

In December 2008, Romanian national Marin Cioroianu was arrested in Harghita County, Romania, in connection with the July 2007 murder of Brahim Déby, the son of Chadian president Idriss Déby, in a Paris parking garage. Déby's attackers had shot arrows at him, tackled him, and attacked him with fire extinguisher foam, leading to death by asphyxiation. DNA in a glove taken from Cioroianu's car matched DNA collected at the murder scene. However, due to Interpol's French office lacking funds to pay for his extradition to France, Cioroianu remained in custody in Romania.

== Similarities of flags ==
The flags of Romania and Chad are nearly identical, both being vertical tricolors of blue, yellow, and red. The blue is slightly darker on the Chadian flag than on the Romanian flag.

Chad began to use its present flag in 1960, after achieving independence from France. At that time, the Chadian and Romanian flags were distinguishable by the latter's inclusion of the coat of arms of the Socialist Republic of Romania in the centre. However, in 1989, the coat of arms was removed after the revolution which overthrew Nicolae Ceaușescu. Romania had used its older flag starting in 1866, based on a flag used since 1848 in its region of Wallachia.

In 2004, there were unconfirmed media reports that Chad had called on the United Nations to look into the issue, prompting then Romanian president Ion Iliescu to make a public statement that his country would not give up the flag. BBC News quoted Iliescu as stating that "The tricolour belongs to us. We will not give up the tricolour."

== See also ==
- Foreign relations of Chad
- Foreign relations of Romania
