= Chad–Turkey relations =

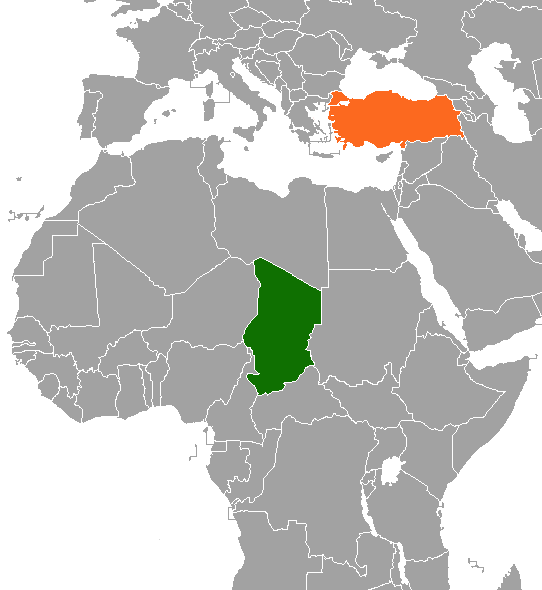
- Chad: Turkey

Chad–Turkey relations are the foreign relations between Chad and Turkey. Neither country had a resident embassy before a Turkish Embassy opened in N’Djamena on 1 March 2013, and a Chadian one in Ankara on 10 December 2014. Turkey recognized the independence of Chad on August 11, 1960 and established diplomatic relations on January 27, 1960.

== Historical relations ==
Turkey had long-standing cultural, ethnic and religious ties with Chad, especially with northern Chad. Through the 1980s and 1990s, both Turkey's and Chad's foreign policy was pro-Western in the 1980s, united in the belief that the spread of communism posed a threat to the world.

During the 1980s and 1990s, Turkey and Chad had limited economic ties but the drought in the early 1990s brought Turkish aid to Chad, including agricultural, medical and technical supplies.

Relations were limited until early 2010s because of Chad's landlocked status and limited air transport service. Following the opening of Turkish and Chadian embassies on March 1, 2013 and December 10, 2014 respectively, bilateral relations gained momentum.

In 2020, however, relations between two countries have soured, after Chadian president Idriss Déby denounced Turkish role in the second Libyan conflict and sent nearly 2,000 soldiers to assist Khalifa Haftar, who is Turkey's foe in the conflict.

== Presidential visits ==
Guest	Host	Place of visit	Date of visit
(Chad) President Idriss Déby	(Turkey) President Süleyman Demirel	Çankaya Köşkü, Ankara	April 27–30, 2000
(Chad) Prime minister Kalzeubet Pahimi Deubet	(Turkey) President Recep Tayyip Erdoğan	Çankaya Köşkü, Ankara	January 28, 2015
(Turkey) President Recep Tayyip Erdoğan	(Chad) President Idriss Déby	Presidential Palace, N'Djamena	December 26, 2017
(Chad) President Idriss Déby	(Turkey) President Recep Tayyip Erdoğan	Presidential Complex, Ankara	February 26–28, 2019

== Economic relations ==
- Trade volume between the two countries was US$72.4 million in 2019 (Turkish exports/imports: US$39.9/32.5 million).
- Turkish Airlines began direct flights from Istanbul to N’Djamena on December 12, 2013.

== See also ==
- Foreign relations of Chad
- Foreign relations of Turkey
