= Chad–China relations =

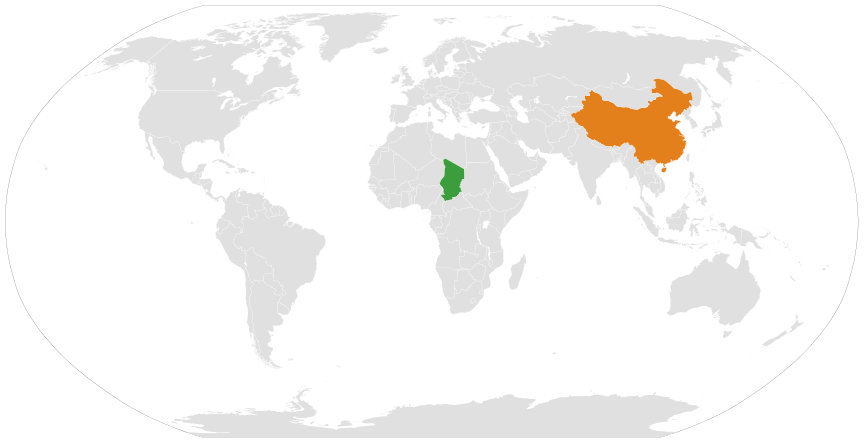
- Chad: China

Chad–China relations refers to the current and historical relationship between the Republic of Chad and the People's Republic of China. Bilateral relations were initially established in 1972 but were severed by China in 1997 due to Chad's recognition of the Republic of China (Taiwan). Relations resumed in August 2006 when Chad ended its relationship with Taiwan and pledged adherence to the One China Policy. The ties between the two nations are primarily economic, although there is some cooperation in security. The economic ties are profitable for both countries, with China providing aid and investment in exchange for natural resources to fuel its economic growth.

== History of relationships ==
=== Development ===
Chad–China relations have played an important role in the economic development of Chad. The Republic of Chad is a poor, landlocked country in West Africa. A former French colony, it gained independence on August 11, 1960, under President Francois Tombalbaye. Following independence, Chad has oscillated between engaging in foreign relations with either Taiwan or China. Chad had diplomatic relations with Taiwan from 1962 to 1972.

By 1965, Tombalbaye's anti-Muslim policies increased opposition to his government and led to an extended civil war, which further damaged the economy. When low-quality crude oil was discovered in the 1960s, investors were hesitant to develop the resource because of the political instability in the region. During this time, The People's Republic of China supported the Chadian National Union (CNU), a revolutionary group opposed to the French-backed government.

Despite this, by 1972, France and China had established ambassadorial level diplomatic relations. Chad and the PRC established relations on November 28, 1972. Trade agreements were signed between China and Chad in 1973, along with a US$10 million loan. These funds contributed to many projects to improve Chad's infrastructure, including the National Assembly Building and medical facilities. In August 1997, Chad switched its diplomatic relations back to Taiwan as it received financial support in the form of a US$125 million loan, which was used for the construction of infrastructures such as roads and water distributions systems. Taiwan's support allowed Chad to develop its infrastructure and expand its oil industry. In return, Chad acknowledged Taiwan's government and Taiwan gained potential access to markets and resources as they were developed.

However, in August 2006, Chad informed Taiwan that it would resume relations with China, and Taiwan's reaction was to break off relations with Chad. Chad professed the One China principle, supporting the goal of creating one China. On a state visit to China in 2007, President Deby voiced his support for reunification. Other analysts emphasized the attraction of trade and investment deals from China in exchange for oil and other raw materials from Chad.

=== China's role in the Chad–Sudan conflict ===
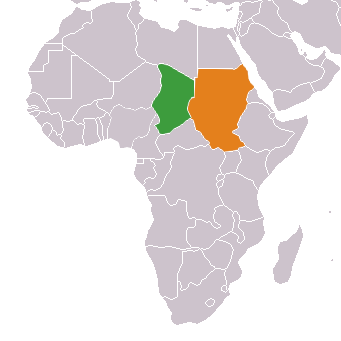
Chad Sudan Border

In 2006, Chadian rebels backed by Sudan almost succeeded in ousting the Deby government. Although the rebels denied that they were linked to China, they carried weapons supplied by China to Sudan. In August 2006, as Chad resumed relations with China, Taiwan publicly stated that Chad reestablished relations with China because of the proxy war with Sudan. Minister of Foreign Affairs James Huang said that President Idriss Déby of Chad had engaged in secret meetings with China to ask for intervention in the conflict on its border. Upon resuming relations with Chad, China proclaimed that it supported Chad's efforts to safeguard sovereignty and promote economic development. Over time, as Chinese assets increased in Chad, it became more vulnerable to regional instability. In 2008, another coup attempt by rebels backed by Sudan forced the evacuation of over 210 Chinese nationals from the capital. China assumed a diplomatic role to improve Chad-Sudan relations as well as enhancing its military relations with Chad.

=== Contemporary relations ===
China and Chad are working to expand their bilateral cooperation in the development of infrastructure, trade, and investment. More recently, General Secretary of the Chinese Communist Party Xi Jinping has offered China's assistance to Chad in strengthening its counter-terrorism efforts to ensure stability.

Chad follows the one China principle. It recognizes the People's Republic of China as the sole government of China and Taiwan as an integral part of China's territory, and supports all efforts by the PRC to "achieve national reunification". It also considers Hong Kong, Xinjiang and Tibet to be China's internal affairs.

==== Impacts of Covid-19 ====
The COVID-19 pandemic has introduced tension into the relations between African nations and China. China has been reluctant to support the G-20's decision to suspend payments on debt through the end of the year.

During the 1990s, thousands of African Expatriates moved to China, especially to the city of Guangzhou, for better opportunities. Discrimination against their communities has been previously documented. However, the pandemic has raised new concerns. In China, Chadians and other Africans have been evicted from their residences, repeatedly tested for COVID-19, and forced to isolate based on their race. China has downplayed the situation, but multiple African ambassadors and representatives of the African Union, of which Chad is a member, have vocally complained to Beijing after incidents were posted on social media. In response, Zhao Lijian, a Foreign Ministry spokesperson, issued conciliatory remarks calling for unity.

The first case of COVID-19 in Chad occurred on March 19, 2020. The head of China's medical team in Chad was invited to help coordinate the response to the epidemic by the Chad National Anti-epidemic Technical Committee. China is donating medical supplies and medical expertise to fight the epidemic in Chad.

== Economy ==
China has an influential role in Africa. Researchers have offered varying views of the phenomena. Some describe China as a rising hegemon that sees Africa as a means of exerting its diplomatic and political influence in the world order. AidData notes that China appears to reward African countries that vote with it at the United Nations. Some critics find parallels to colonialism in China's interactions with African nations. Others emphasize the mutual benefits. Whereas nations like Chad reap clear economic benefits in the form of numerous infrastructure programs funded by Chinese developmental assistance, China acquires much needed natural resources and new markets for its products.

=== Energy ===
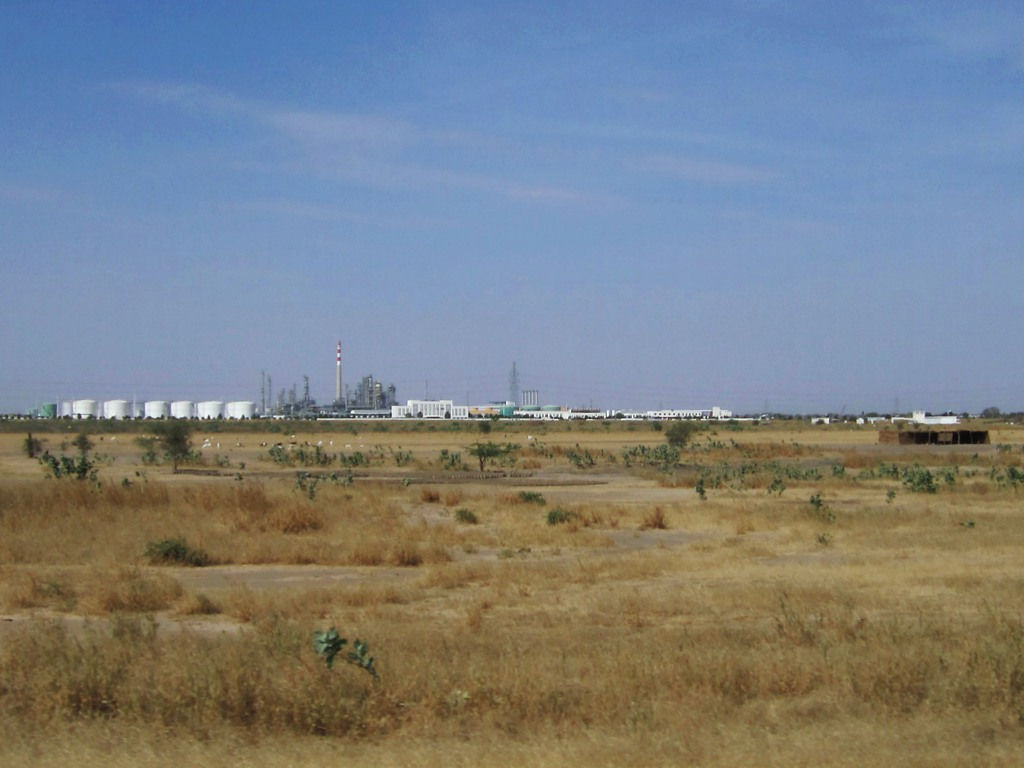
N'Djamena JV Refinery

In the 1990s, Western corporations had renewed interest in the oil deposits in Chad. The IFC, the World Bank, Western investors led by ExxonMobile, and the government of Chad under Idriss Deby, signed onto the Chad Cameroon Pipeline Project that would bring the crude oil from Chad to the Gulf of Guinea in Cameroon. The World Bank provided a loan on the condition that most of the money generated by the pipeline would be used to alleviate poverty among the people of Chad. However, President Deby's government funneled money from the pipeline into the purchases of arms. In 2006, while the World Bank was debating suspending the loans to Chad over violations of money usage, China presented Chad with alternative financing for the loan. Chad took the Chinese offer and thus rejected the World Bank's conditionalized loans.

In 2007, China purchased rights to explore for oil in Block H, in the Bongor Basin. China had an interest in obtaining oil from Chad to support its economic growth. In return, China would provide loans and expertise to improve the economy in Chad. Since 2003, Chad had exported crude oil through the Chad-Cameroon Pipeline; however, it had to import the refined product. In September 2007, China National Petroleum Corp (CNPC) reached an agreement with Chad to work together on the US$1 billion Rônier project. Completed in 2011, the project runs 300 km of pipeline from the oil fields of Chad to the N’Djamena JV Refinery outside the capital city of N’Djamena. Ownership of the refinery is split 60–40 between China and Chad. The refinery produces 20,000 barrels a day of gasoline, diesel, and fuel oil, and its associated power system supplies electricity to the capital, allowing Chad to become more self-sufficient in energy.

=== Development projects ===
In the mid-1970s before breaking ties with Chad, China provided a US$50 million loan to Chad to build a bridge across the Chari River to open a route to Cameroon. Over US$50 million of additional support was provided in the 1980s under agreements between China and the government of President Hissene Habre.

After reestablishing relations in 2006, China deepened engagement in Chad by diversifying from the oil sector. It is making significant investments in high-profile infrastructure projects in Chad. A 25-kilometer square industrial park is being developed by Soluxe International, who has also advanced US$150 million for its construction. Other projects include a cement factory in Baore, which was completed in 2011 and is expected to cut infrastructure costs by manufacturing the product domestically. This project was funded by a preferential loan from the Exim Bank of China. In 2011, Chad also signed a US$919 million deal with the Chinese Engineering Corporation (CAMC) to build a new international airport in Djermaya and the 40 km road to connect it to N’Djamena; the project is ongoing. China Civil Engineering Construction Corporation (CCECC) has been building the US$5.6 million Chad railway network since 2012. Other assistance projects in Chad include road development, the construction of mobile telephone networks, the construction and renovation of hospitals, as well as the construction of a 30,000 seat stadium in N'Djamena. All of these projects show the diverse and extensive involvement of China in Chad.

Chad joined the Belt and Road Initiative (BRI) in 2018.

=== Trade ===
The trade between China and Chad is not one-directional. Chad's top exports are crude petroleum, insect resins, other oily seeds, and cotton. In 2017, China was the second-largest importer of goods from Chad, at an estimated US$251 million. In the same year, China exported US$114 million worth of goods to Chad, making it the top exporter to Chad. Overall, Chad has a positive trade balance with China since it exports more than it imports.

=== Humanitarian efforts ===
Although China's support for countries in Africa, such as Chad, is met with much skepticism by some, others point out the contributions made to Africa. During the cholera epidemic of 1971, China donated cholera vaccines and US$2.5 million to Chad to fight the outbreak. In 1977, China and Chad signed an agreement to send Chinese medical personal to Chad. Since resuming relations with Chad in 2006, China has renovated the Freedom Hospital of Chad and built housing for Chinese medical personnel and provided needed supplies. In the agricultural sector, China has supplied farm machinery, fertilizers, seed, and technical expertise to help with the production of cotton and food.

== Resident diplomatic missions ==
- Chad has an embassy in Beijing.
- China has an embassy in N'Djamena.
