= Lycée Montaigne de N'Djamena =

Location
- N'Djamena; Chad
- Coordinates: 12.119445°N 15.0374582°E

Information
- Other name: LFM
- Type: French international school
- Established: 1977; 48 years ago
- Grades: Maternelle to lycée
- Website: lycee-montaigne-tchad.org

Lycée Montaigne de N'Djamena (LFM) is a French international school in N'Djamena, Chad. Opened in 1977, the school caters for children from maternelle (preschool) through lycée (senior high school) levels.

== See also ==
- Chad–France relations
- Education in Chad
- List of international schools
