= Chad–United States relations =

- Chad: United States

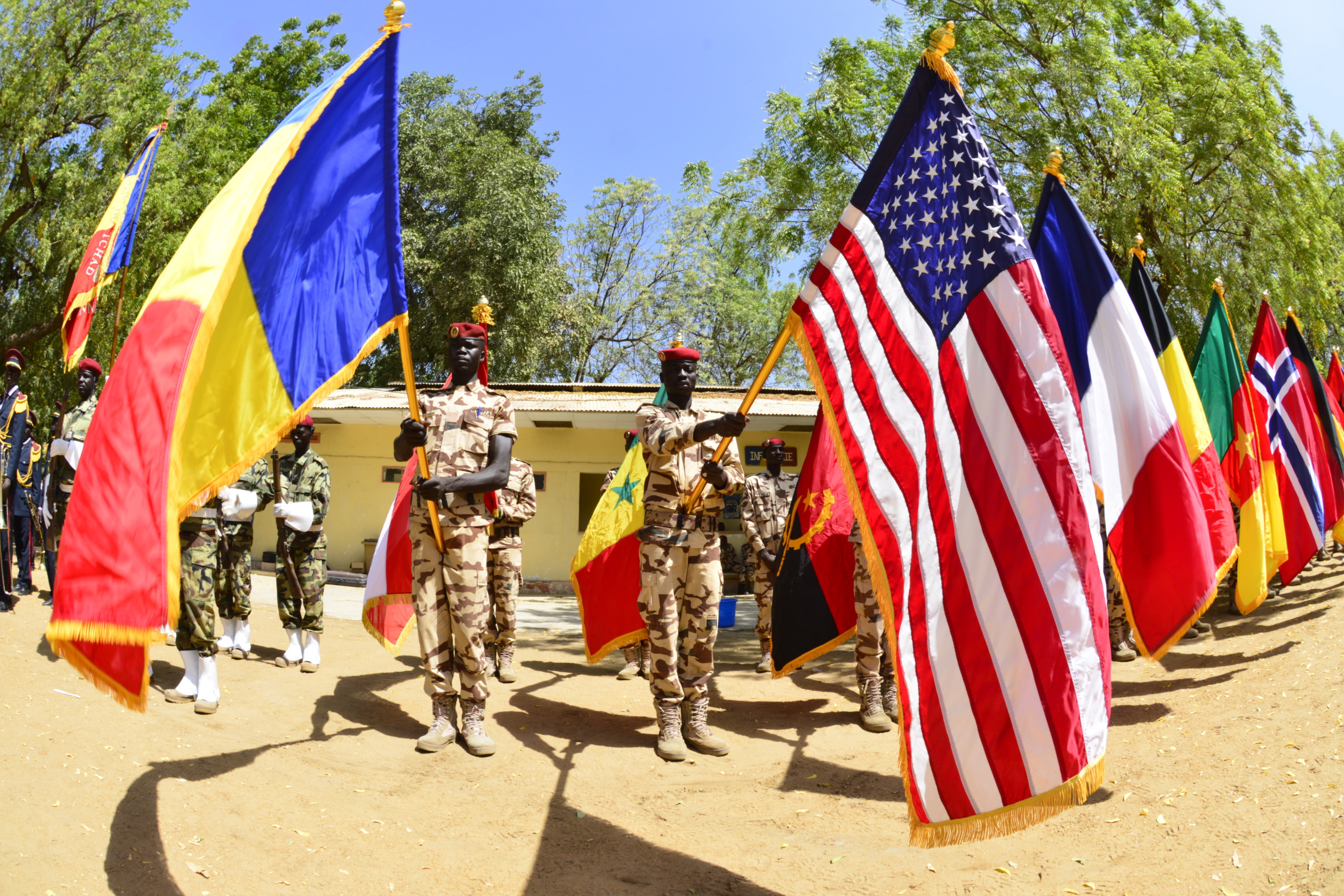
Flags of the U.S. and Chad at the opening of the Flintlock 2017 exercise, organized by the U.S. Africa Command

Chad–United States relations are the international relations between Chad and the United States.

== History ==
Chad and the United States established diplomatic relations on August 11, 1960.

During the 1960s and 1970s, the United States and Chad had maintained fairly low-level economic ties, including investment guarantees and project aid, such as Peace Corps involvement. Drought in the early 1970s brought United States food and agriculture aid to remote areas, including grain supplies, animal health services, and technical assistance. Other economic agreements included road building in the Lake Chad area and rural community development.

In a declassified record of a 1973 conversation between U.S. President Richard Nixon, Secretary of State James R. Schlesinger, and the Chairman of the Joint Chiefs of Staff Admiral Thomas H. Moorer, Nixon referenced the Prime Minister of Chad when explaining how he perceived the relationship between strength and importance: "But without adequate strength, our stance in the world wouldn't matter. The Prime Minister of Chad doesn't matter; we treat them nice, but none of them matter."

Although Chad was part of France's sphere of influence, it also provided a low level of military assistance until 1977. President Félix Malloum's 1978 request for increased military aid to fight the FROLINAT insurgency coincided with a marked increase in Soviet activity in Africa, especially in Ethiopia, and increased Soviet arms shipments to Libya. United States relations with African states were redefined in accordance with the new strategic value assigned to African allies, and United States foreign policy shifted accordingly. Thus, in the 1980s United States interest and involvement in Chad increased.

=== Reagan administration ===
Chad became a focus of American policy regarding North Africa when Secretary of State Alexander Haig sought new ways to undermine the Muammar Gaddafi regime, which was destabilizing much of the region from its base in neighboring Libya. A plan was developed to attack Libya's southern front through Chad at a time when much of the northern half of Chad was occupied by Libyan troops. The Central intelligence Agency provided arms for the anti-Qaddafi faction led by Hissène Habré. The plan was successful, Qaddafi withdrew his troops. Habré seized control of the government of Chad in 1982, and received enthusiastic military and financial support from Washington. However, by 1988 American advisers had begun to stress the need to reconcile warring factions and pacify rebel groups within Chad. United States support to Chad included several economic and military aid agreements, including training programs to improve the effectiveness of Habré's administration and to bolster public confidence in the government and intelligence-sharing to assist in countering Libyan forces in 1987.

The United States enjoyed cordial relations with the government of Idriss Déby. Chad has proved a valuable partner in the global war on terror, and in providing shelter to 200,000 refugees of Sudan's Darfur crisis along its eastern border.

=== Foreign aid ===
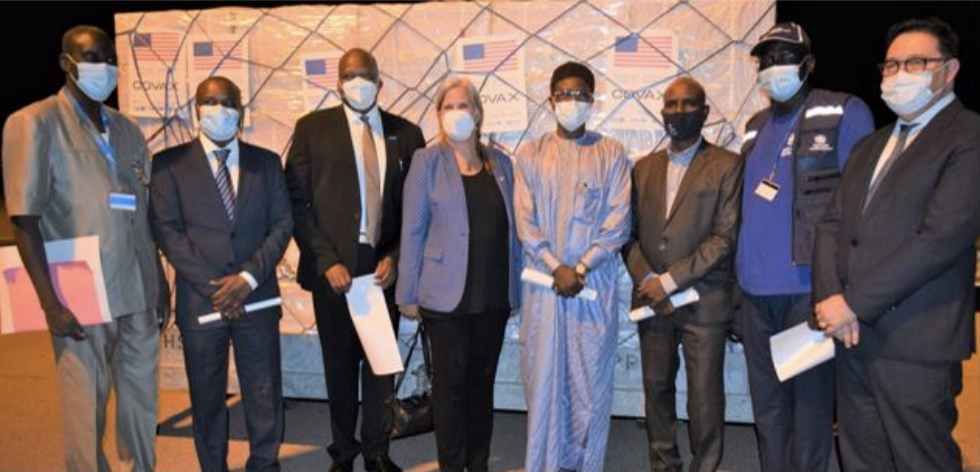
The US delivers COVID-19 vaccines to Chad as part of the COVAX initiative in 2021

Before permanently closing its Chad mission in 1995 because of declining funds and security concerns, USAID's development program in Chad concentrated on the agricultural, health, and infrastructure sectors. It also included projects in road repair and maintenance, maternal and child health, famine early warning systems, and agricultural marketing. A number of American voluntary agencies (notably Africare and VITA) continue to operate in Chad. Peace Corps has traditionally had a large presence in Chad, with volunteers arriving during the postwar period in September 1987, then withdrawing in 1998. Peace Corps operations resumed in September 2003, with a group of 20 new volunteers. The second class of 17 volunteers arrived in September 2 to the United States, citing the risk of terrorism. Regional experts including J004. Both groups focused on teaching English; expansion into other areas was planned for 2005. Currently the Peace Corps presence in Chad is inactive.

In April 2007, Deputy Secretary of State John Negroponte visited Chad in light of the War in Darfur.

Chad is a participant in the Trans-Saharan Counterterrorism Initiative and cooperates with the United States military in fighting al-Qaeda in the Islamic Maghreb (and affiliated) insurgents.

In April 2024, Chad asked the United States to stop using an air force base located in N'Djamena.

=== Obama administration ===
Between August 4–6, 2014, Chadian President Idriss Déby attended the United States–Africa Leaders Summit 2014 hosted by US President Barack Obama.

=== First Trump administration ===
On September 24, 2017, US President Donald Trump announced a travel ban that restricted the travel of the citizens of Chad. Peter Pham of the Atlantic Council, Monde Muyangwa of the Woodrow Wilson International Center for Scholars and John Campbell of the Council on Foreign Relations expressed concern that Chad could reduce its defense and counter-terrorism cooperation with the United States in response. On April 10, 2018, the US Government issued a proclamation lifting the travel restrictions on Chad.

=== Biden administration ===
Between December 13–15, 2022, Chadian President Mahamat Déby attended the United States–Africa Leaders Summit 2022 hosted by US President Joe Biden.

=== Second Trump administration ===
On June 4, 2025, President Donald Trump, in his second administration, announced a travel ban that restricted the travel of the citizens of Chad to the United States as part of a proclamation banning 11 other nations. In response to the ban, on the next day, President Mahamat Déby announced that Chad is suspending all visas awarded to U.S. citizens as a retaliatory measure against the travel ban. This would see a deterioration of Chad–United States relations.

In 2026, as a response to the death of Iran's Supreme Leader Ali Khamenei following strikes by Israel and the United States, Déby expressed solidarity with Iran, sharing in the 'pain of the Iranian nation'.

== Education ==
The American International School of N'Djamena was in the Chadian capital until closing in 2008.

== History of the diplomatic missions ==
The U.S. embassy in N'Djamena, established at Chadian independence in 1960, was closed from the onset of the heavy fighting in the city in 1980 until the withdrawal of the Libyan forces at the end of 1981. It was reopened in January 1982. The U.S. Agency for International Development (USAID) and the U.S. Information Service (USIS) offices resumed activities in Chad in September 1983.

In 2008, the government of Chad purchased the building hosting it's embassy. After a four-month renovation in 2009, the embassy employees moved from their previous location at 2002 R Street, NW building, into the new facility.

== Resident diplomatic missions ==
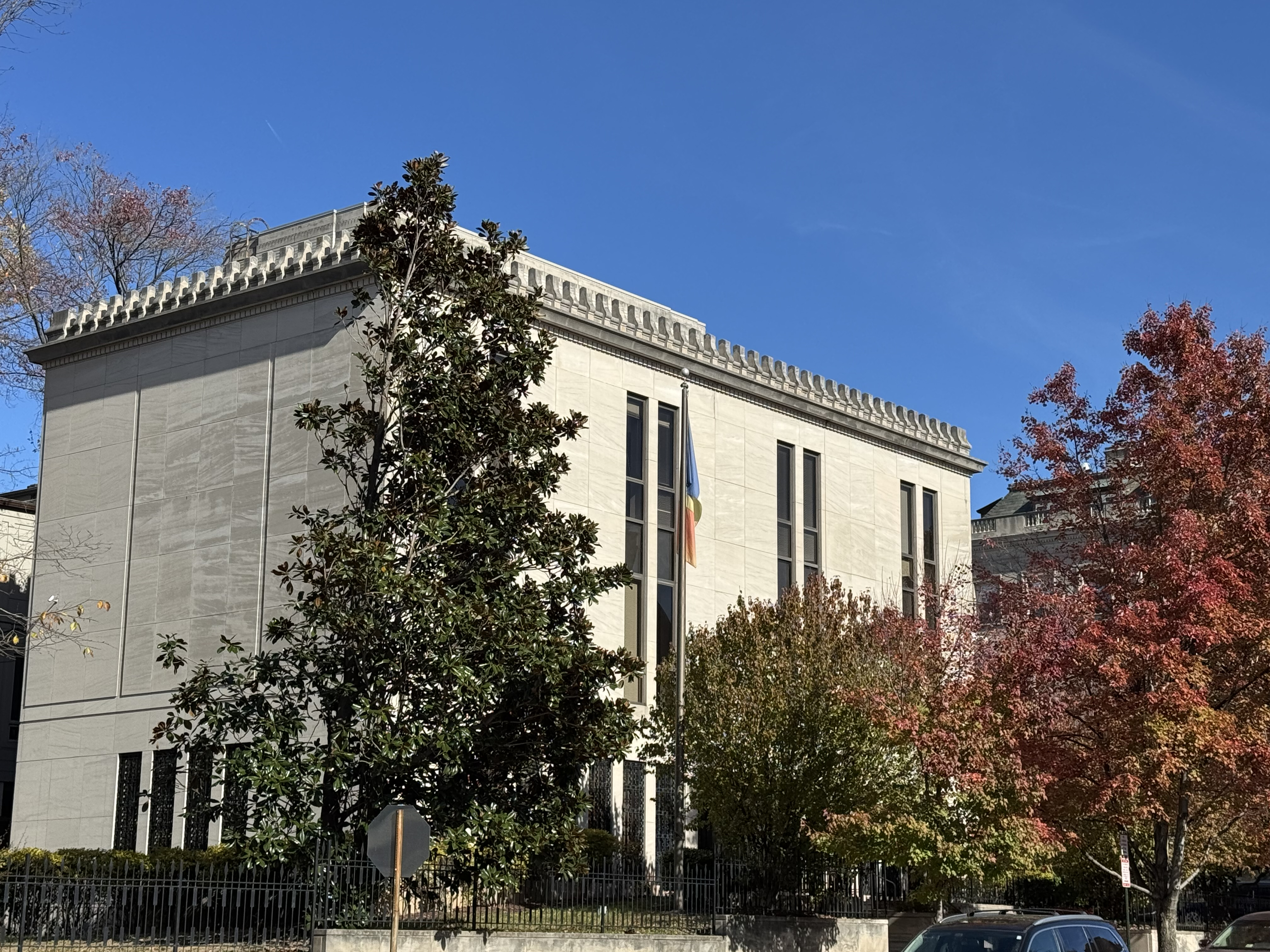
Embassy of Chad in Washington D.C.

- Chad has an embassy in Washington, D.C.
- United States has an embassy in N'Djamena.

== See also ==
- List of ambassadors of Chad to the United States
- List of ambassadors of the United States to Chad
- Foreign relations of Chad
- Foreign relations of the United States
- CIA activities in Chad
