= Chad–France relations =

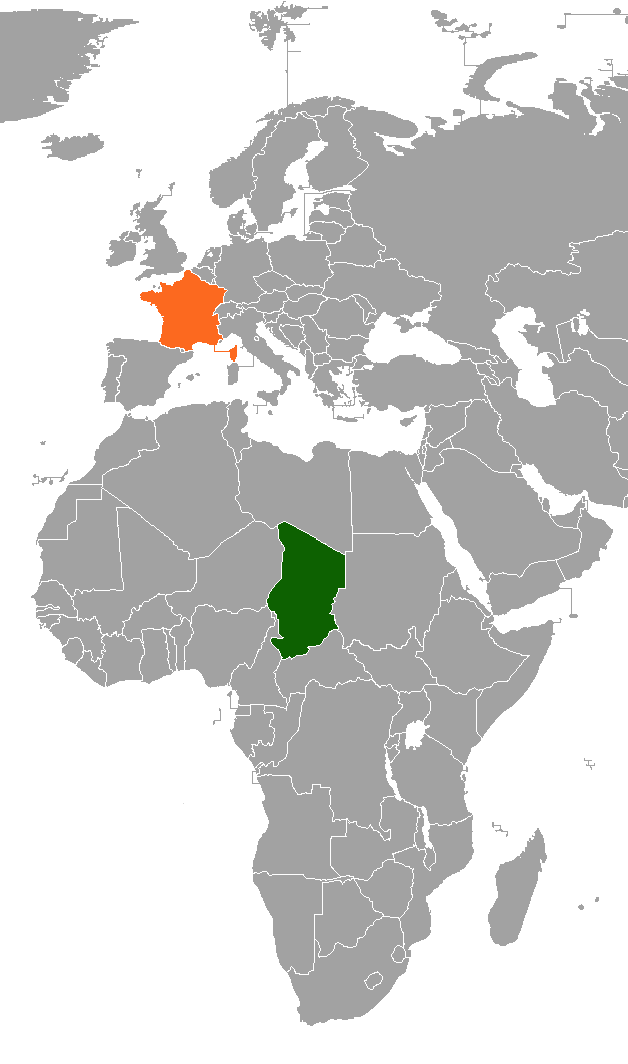
- Chad: France

Chad–France relations are the diplomatic relations between the Republic of Chad and the French Republic. France controlled Chad from 1900 until the country's independence in 1960. Both nations are today members of the Francophonie and the United Nations.

== History ==
=== French Colonialism ===
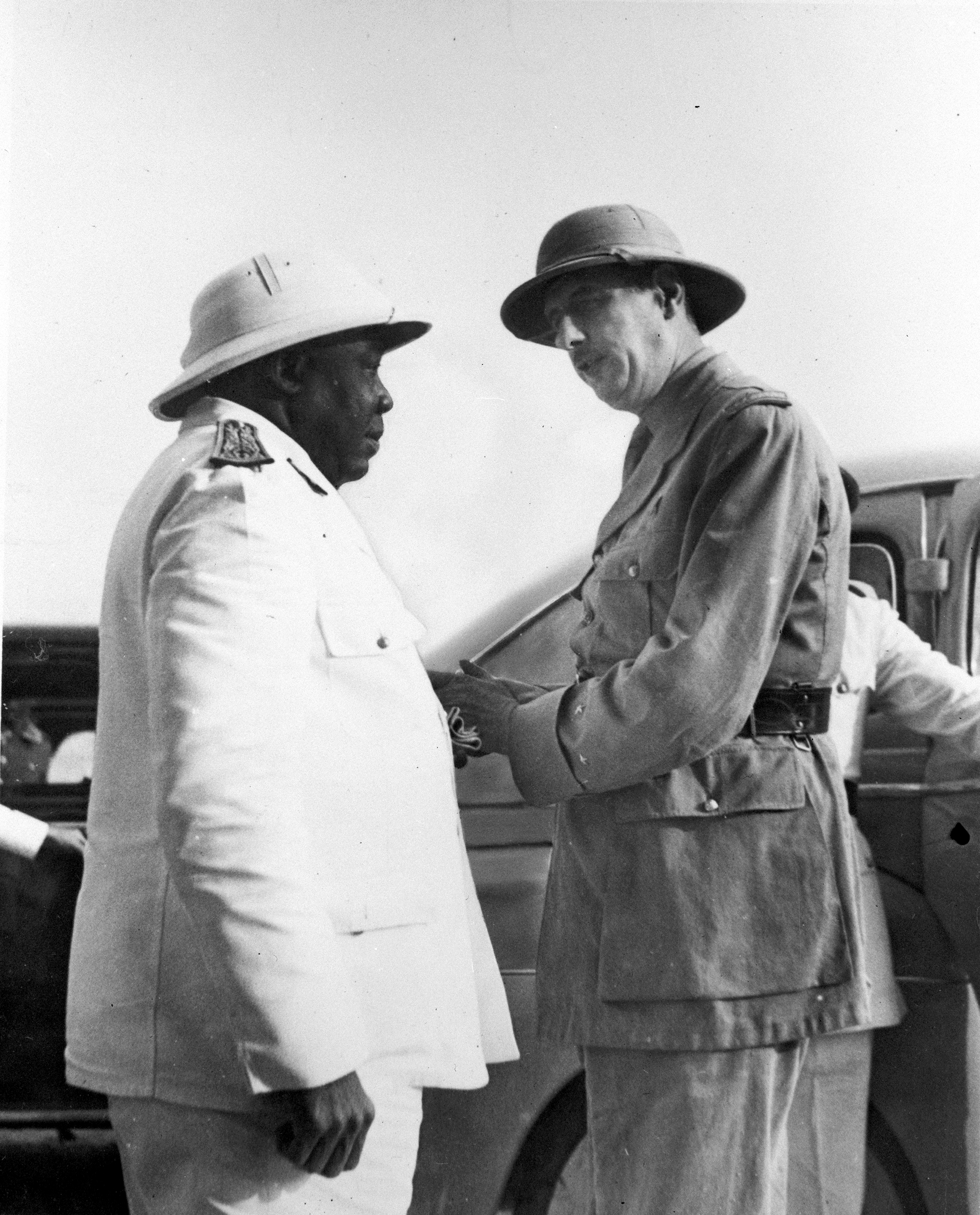
Governor Félix Éboué and General Charles de Gaulle in Fort-Lamy (N'Djamena); 1940.

During the Partition of Africa France entered the territory of Chad in the late 1890s. In April 1900, France fought against the warlord Rabih az-Zubayr and his forces to control the territory and succeeded in defeating Rabih's forces at the Battle of Kousséri. After the battle, France took control of the Chadian territory (Territoire du Tchad) and incorporated as a French colony under the federation of French Equatorial Africa in 1910.

In January 1939, France appointed Félix Éboué as the first Governor of Chad and first black Governor of a French colony. As Governor, Éboué would align the territory of Chad to Free France after German occupation of the country and German controlled Vichy France. In October 1940, Free French General Charles de Gaulle paid a visit to Chad and meet with Éboué in Fort-Lamy (present date N'Djamena). During World War II Chadian soldiers partook in the fighting for the Liberation of Paris. France also created two regiments during the war and named them after the territory (Régiment de marche du Tchad and Régiment de tirailleurs sénégalais du Tchad).

=== Independence ===
Soon after the second World War, France adopted a new constitution in 1946 and granted full French citizenship to residents of French Chad and allowed for the establishment of local assemblies within the new French Union. In March 1953, De Gaulle paid a second visit to Chad. In 1958, Chadians voted in a referendum which granted them greater autonomy. As a result, the French Union dissolved and on 11 August 1960, Chad was granted independence from France.

=== Post Independence ===
France was Chad's most important foreign donor and patron for the first three decades following independence in 1960. At the end of the 1980s, economic ties were still strong, and France provided development assistance in the form of loans and grants. It was no longer Chad's leading customer for agricultural exports, but it continued to provide substantial military support.

Chad remained a member of the African Financial Community (Communauté Financière Africaine—CFA), which linked the value of its currency, the CFA franc, to the French franc. French private and government investors owned a substantial portion of Chad's industrial and financial institutions, and the French treasury backed the Bank of Central African States (Banque des Etats de l'Afrique Centrale—BEAC), which served as the central bank for Chad and six other member nations. Chad's dependence on France declined slightly during Habré's tenure as president, in part because other foreign donors and investors returned as the war subsided and also because increased rainfall since 1985 improved food production. French official attitudes toward Chad had changed from the 1970s policies under the leadership of Giscard d'Estaing to those of the Mitterrand era of the 1980s. Economic, political, and strategic goals, which had emphasized maintaining French influence in Africa, exploiting Chad's natural resources, and bolstering francophone Africa's status as a bulwark against the spread of Soviet influence, had been replaced by nominally anticolonialist attitudes. The election in France of the Socialist government in 1981 had coincided with conditions of near-anarchy in Chad, leading France's Socialist Party to reaffirm its ideological stance against high-profile intervention in Africa. Hoping to avoid a confrontation with Libya, another important client state in the region, President Mitterrand limited French military involvement to a defense of the region surrounding N'Djamena in 1983 and 1984. Then, gradually increasing its commitment to reinforce Habré's presidency, France once again increased its military activity in Chad.

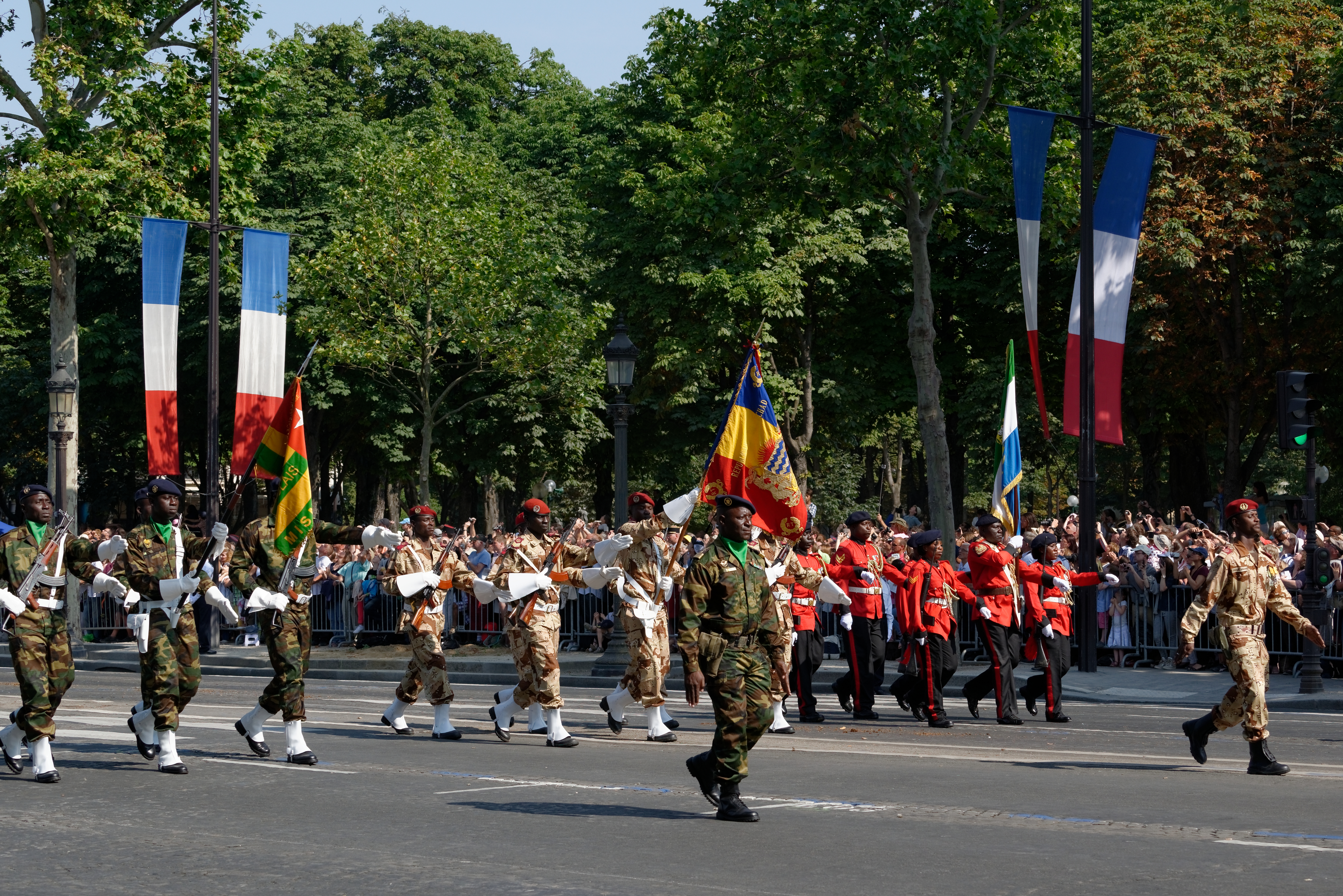
Chadian soldiers taking part in the military parade of Bastille Day; 2013.

In 1990, France (along with Libya and Sudan) gave extensive support to the successful coup d'état attempt by Idriss Déby, who took the presidency from Hissene Habré. Since then, France has supported Déby from being ousted from office and they keep a military presence in the country. In November 2007, President Nicolas Sarkozy paid a visit to Chad. In 2008, President Nicolas Sarkozy stated that France's relationship with Chad, since it was established in an era with a different political landscape, should be re-negotiated or ended. In July 2014, French President François Hollande paid a visit to Chad. France maintains an air force base at N'Djamena International Airport where it has launched humanitarian and counter-terrorism missions to the Central African Republic, Mali and Niger.

On 23 April 2021, French President Emmanuel Macron attended the funeral of President Idriss Déby who had succumbed to injuries resulting from gunshots on 20 April 2021 while commanding his army against FACT rebels in the north of Chad.

On 28 November 2024, Chad announced it would end a defense and security cooperation agreement with France. Dating from 1966, and revised in 2019. Per a government statement, Chad wants to maintain "constructive relations with France in other areas of common interest, for the benefit of both peoples". On November 29, France acknowledged the denunciation of the defense and security cooperation agreements with Chad. On December 5, Chad set up a commission responsible for implementing the denunciation of the military cooperation agreements between France and Chad. France, for its part, has announced that it has entered into discussions on the termination of the military and security cooperation contract with Chad. On December 6, demonstrations in support of the termination of military cooperation agreements took place in Chad. On December 10, the French fighter aircraft detachment based in Chad began the withdrawal of the French army from Chad. On January 10, 2025, the Abéché military base was returned to Chad by France. In January 2025, the N'Djamena air military base begins to be emptied. The last air base in Chad, the Sergent Adji Kossei base, or commonly 172 Fort-Lamy, is being handed over, starting January 31, 2025.

== Trade ==
In 2016, total trade between Chad and France amounted to €211 million Euros. Chad's main exports to France are primarily Gum arabic and oil. France's main exports to Chad include: medicine, flour, cereals, electronic equipment and automobiles. French multinational companies such as Air France, Le Méridien, Novotel, Société Générale and Total S.A. operate in Chad.

== Resident diplomatic missions ==
- Chad has an embassy in Paris.
- France has an embassy in N'Djamena.
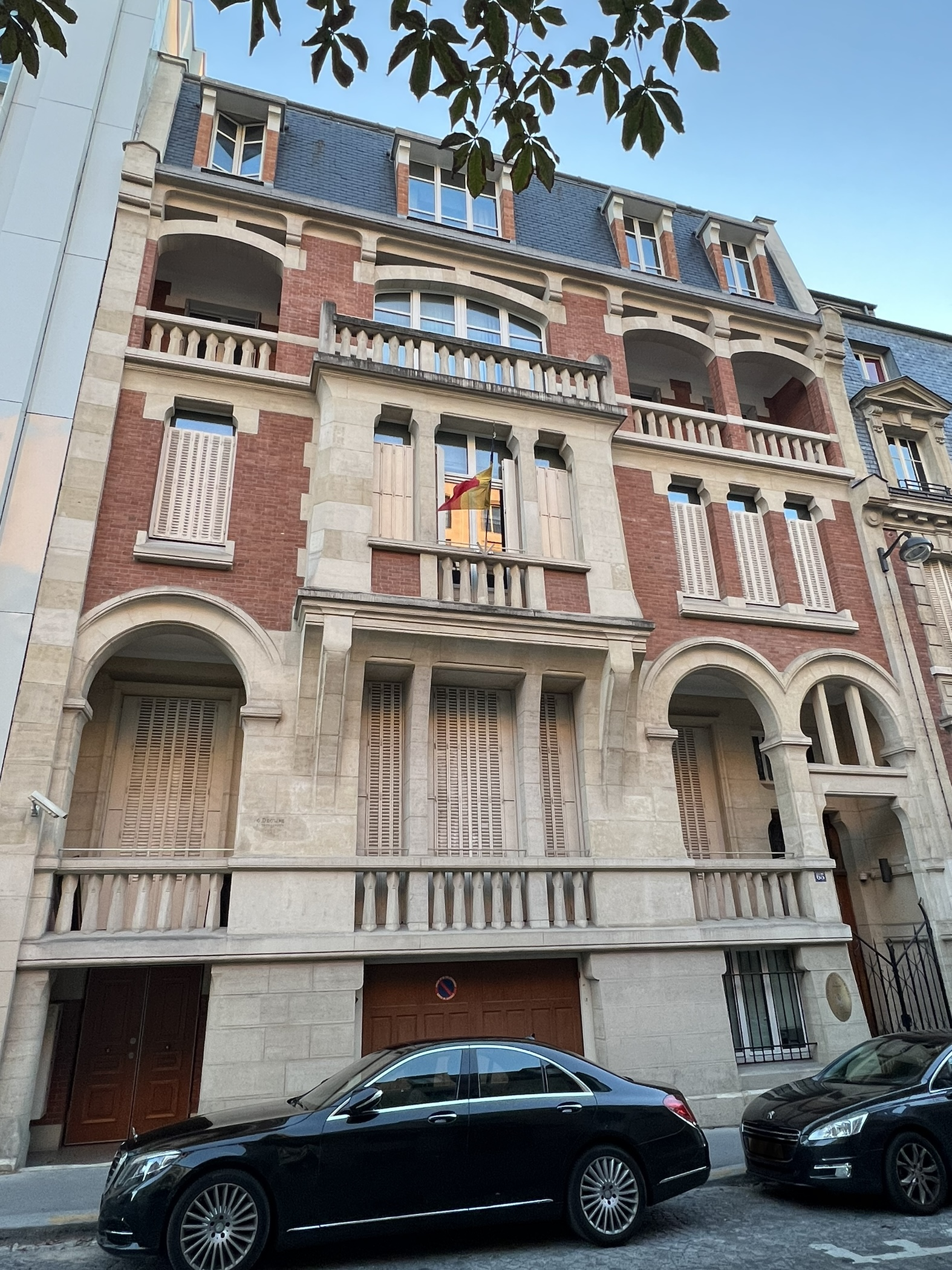
Embassy of Chad in Paris

== See also ==
- Françafrique
- Lycée Montaigne de N'Djamena
- Opération Épervier
