= Chad–Mexico relations =

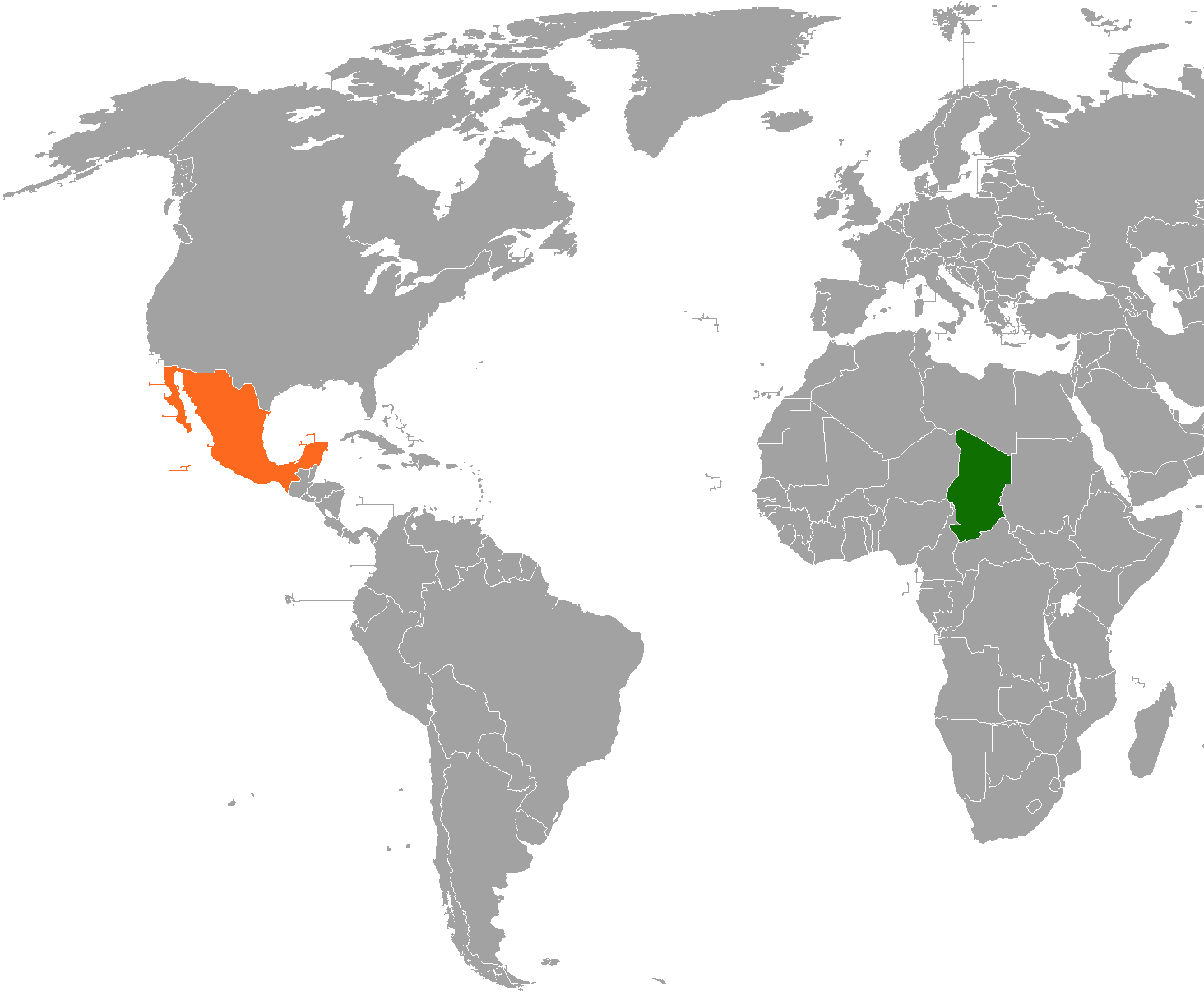

- Chad: Mexico

The nations of Chad and Mexico established diplomatic relations in 1976. Both nations are members of the United Nations.

== History ==
On 25 February 1976, Chad and Mexico established diplomatic relations. Initial relations between both nations have been limited and have mainly taken place in multilateral forums such as at the United Nations. In March 2002, Chadian Prime Minister Nagoum Yamassoum attended the Monterrey Consensus in the Mexican city of Monterrey where he met with President Vicente Fox.

During the Chadian Civil War and Opération Épervier, Mexican mercenaries have been hired by Chadian President Idriss Déby, to fight against rebel forces trying to remove President Déby from power. The Mexican mercenaries were hired to fly Mil Mi-17 attack helicopters, which the Mexican Air Force also uses.

In February 2013, Mexico welcomed the ratification by Chad of the Comprehensive Nuclear-Test-Ban Treaty. In April 2014, Chadian Minister of Planning and International Cooperation, Mariam Mahamat Nour paid a visit to Mexico to attend the Global Partnership for Effective Development Cooperation conference in Mexico City. That same year, in May 2014, Chadian Minister of Agriculture and of the Environment, Baïwong Djibergui Amane Rosine paid a visit to Cancún to attend the Assembly of the Global Environment Facility conference.

Chadian-born playwright, poet, novelist and university lecturer, Koulsy Lamko is a laureate of the Chadian Literary Grand Prix. Lamko resides in Mexico City where he directs Casa Refugio Hankili So África, a center of artistic residence and writers of people of African ancestry and from the black diaspora.

In 2023, both nations celebrated 47 years of diplomatic relations. In 2024, migrants originating from Chad were found in Mexico attempting to illegally enter the United States. A few migrants have also been found dead attempting to cross the border.

== High-level visits ==
High-level visits from Chad to Mexico

- Prime Minister Nagoum Yamassoum (2002)
- Minister of Planning and International Cooperation Mariam Mahamat Nour (2014)
- Minister of Agriculture Baïwong Djibergui Amane Rosine (2014)

== Trade ==
In 2023, trade between Chad and Mexico totaled US$2.6 million. Chad's main exports to Mexico include: electronic integrated circuits, power transformers, electrical apparatuses, hides and skins, springs and leaves of iron or steel, and hand tools. Mexico's main exports to Chad include: malt extract and food preparations, medicines, and telephones and mobiles phones.

== Diplomatic missions ==
- Chad is accredited to Mexico from its embassy in Washington, D.C., United States.
- Mexico is accredited to Chad from its embassy in Cairo, Egypt.
