= Chad–Taiwan relations =

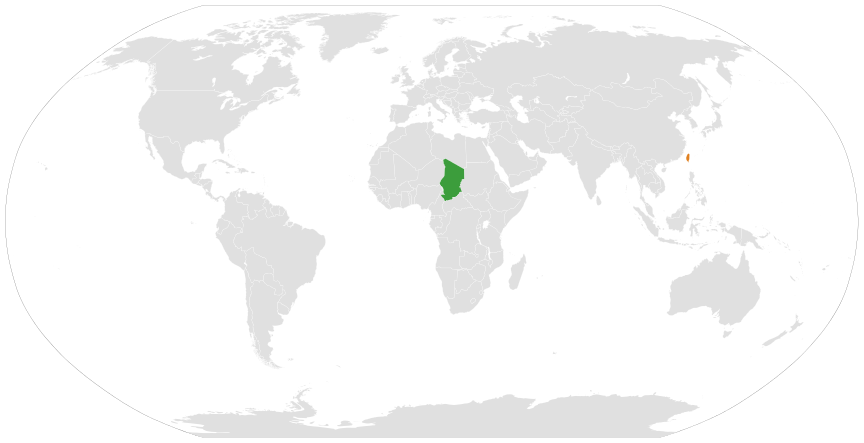
- Chad: Republic of China

Chad–Taiwan relations are relations between Chad and the Republic of China (ROC).

== History ==
Chad and the Republic of China first established bilateral relations in 1962, before Chad chose to switch recognition from the ROC to the People's Republic of China in 1972. The ROC increased the amount of foreign aid going to Chad in the 1990s and bilateral ties were restored in 1997. In 2000, ROC President Chen Shui-bian became the first non-African head of state to visit Chad. In July 2006, ROC Minister of Foreign Affairs James C. F. Huang visited N'Djamena and met with the leaders of Chad to improve relations between the two nations. On 6 August 2006, Chad switched diplomatic relations from the ROC to the PRC for the second time.

== Economy ==
The ROC had been helping Chad to develop its infrastructure and offer to expand its oil industry. In January 2006, Chinese Petroleum Corporation signed an agreement with the Government of Chad for the rights to explore oil and gas in the country. Despite Chad's switch to the PRC in 2006, the CPC maintains 35% of oil exploration rights in the oil field and received the first shipment of oil in December 2020.

== See also ==
- Foreign relations of Chad
- Foreign relations of Taiwan
