= List of diplomatic missions in Chad =

This is a list of diplomatic missions accredited to Chad. At present, the capital city of N'Djamena hosts 28 embassies, while other countries have envoys resident in other capitals who are also accredited to Chad.

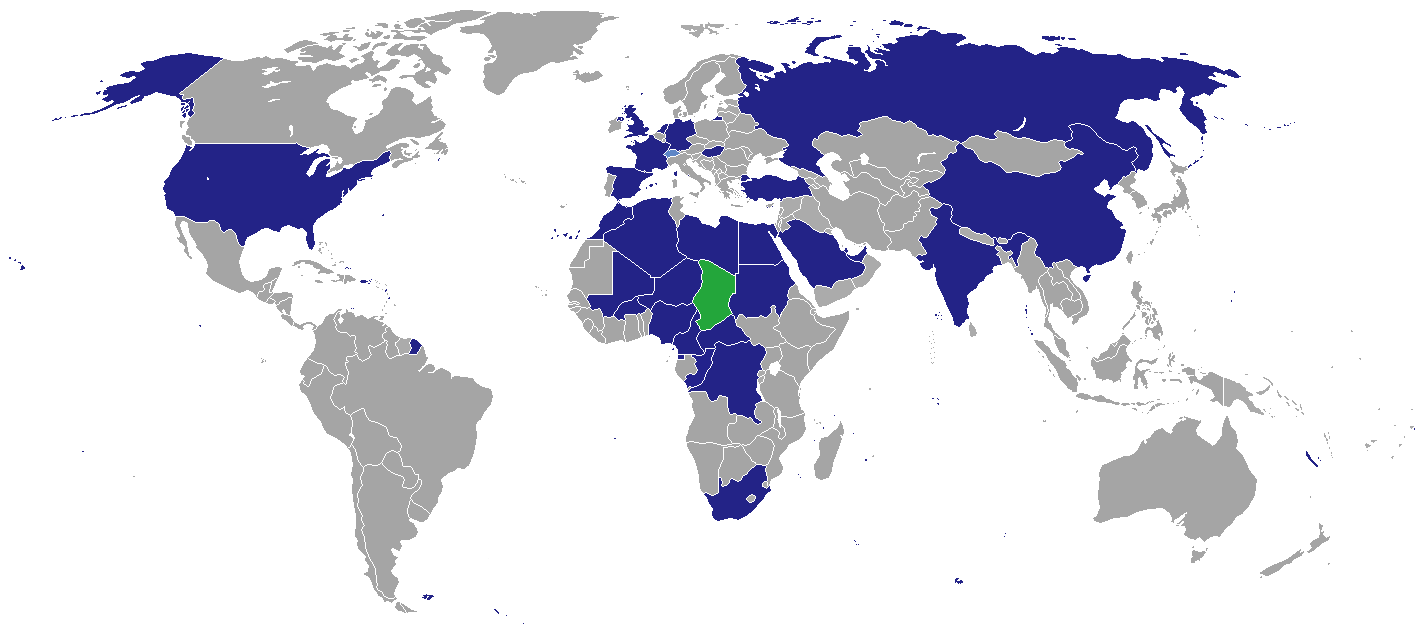
Map of diplomatic missions in Chad

== Diplomatic missions in N'Djamena ==
=== Embassies ===
1. Algeria
2. Burkina Faso
3. Cameroon
4. Central African Republic
5. China
6. Congo-Brazzaville
7. Congo-Kinshasa
8. Egypt
9. Equatorial Guinea
10. France
11. Germany
12. Holy See
13. Hungary
14. India
15. Libya
16. Mali
17. Morocco
18. Niger
19. Nigeria
20. Qatar
21. Russia
22. Saudi Arabia
23. South Africa
24. Sudan
25. Turkey
26. United Arab Emirates
27. United Kingdom
28. United States

=== Other missions or delegations ===
- European Union (Delegation)
- Netherlands (Embassy office) (Note: Subordinate to the Dutch embassy in Khartoum, Sudan.)
- Spain (Embassy Office)
- Switzerland (Cooperation office & consular agency) (Note: Subordinate to the Swiss embassy in Abuja, Nigeria.)

== Consular missions ==
=== Abéché ===
- Libya (Consulate General)

=== Moundou ===
- Congo-Kinshasa (Consulate)

== Non-resident embassies ==
=== Resident in Abuja, Nigeria ===
- Argentina
- Australia
- Austria
- Benin
- Czechia
- Portugal
- Malaysia
- Switzerland
- Vietnam
- Zambia

=== Resident in Addis Ababa, Ethiopia ===
- Burundi
- Djibouti
- Israel

=== Resident in Khartoum, Sudan ===
- Jordan
- Netherlands
- Oman
- Pakistan
- Zimbabwe

=== Resident in Tripoli, Libya ===
- Cyprus
- Philippines
- Poland
- Serbia
- Slovakia

=== Resident in Yaoundé, Cameroon ===
- Belgium
- Brazil
- Canada
- Indonesia
- Italy
- Japan
- South Korea
- Spain

=== Resident in other cities ===
- Colombia (Cairo)
- Croatia (Paris)
- Cuba (Niamey)
- Denmark (Ouagadougou)
- Greece (Kinshasa)
- Iran (Niamey)
- Ireland (Cairo)
- Mauritania (Niamey)
- Mexico (Cairo)
- New Zealand (Cairo)
- Norway (Dakar)
- Romania (Algiers)
- Somalia (Juba)
- Sweden (Kampala)
- Ukraine (Tunis)

== Former Embassies ==
Ivory Coast (Embassy)

== See also ==
- Foreign relations of Chad
