= Chad–Nigeria relations =

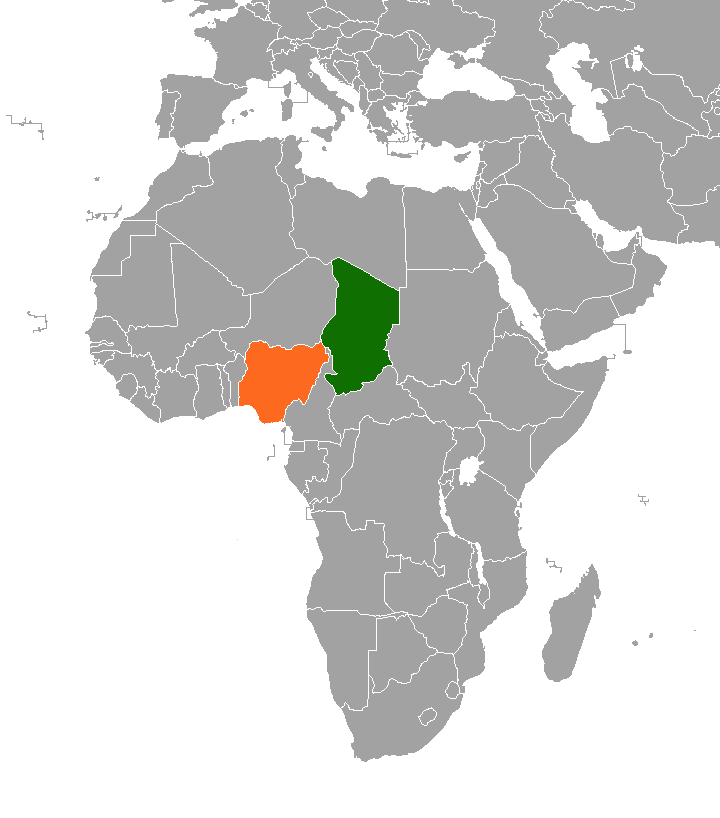

- Chad: Nigeria

The following expands upon the bilateral relations shared between Chad and Nigeria.

== Historical relations ==
Nigeria's influence over Chad grew after the 1975 coup that ousted President François Tombalbaye. Seeking to counter Libyan expansion, Nigeria mediated Chadian conflicts in 1979, backing Mahmat Shawa Lol as a compromise leader. However, his perceived Nigerian allegiance fueled opposition, leading to his short-lived presidency.

== Political relations ==
Both nations have cooperated politically, sharing seats on the UN Security Council. However, tensions arose over border disputes around Lake Chad, exacerbated in the early 1980s by receding water levels that exposed contested islands.

From 2010 to 2023, diplomatic and economic interactions were often hindered by cross-border clashes, affecting regional security and development. According to research using George Homans’ Social Exchange Theory, there is a need for border securitization and improved infrastructure, such as accessible roads, to enhance trade.

In August 2022, Chad held a Sovereign National Dialogue, which aimed to stabilize the country and engage major rebel groups. Mohammadu Buhari expressed support for the dialogue and assured that Nigeria would continue to monitor the situation and offer assistance if needed.

== Economic relations ==
During the 1980s, Nigeria replaced France as Chad's key trading partner, importing livestock, dried fish, and chemicals while exporting foodstuffs and manufactured goods. Informal cross-border trade flourished, and thousands of Chadians worked in Nigeria. However, Nigeria’s 1983 economic austerity measures led to the mass expulsion of foreign workers, including 30,000 Chadians.

== Military relations ==
Security concerns, including Islamic fundamentalism in northern Nigeria, shaped bilateral ties. Nigerian authorities feared Libyan infiltration through Chad. In 2014, Chad deployed troops to fight Boko Haram alongside Nigerian and Cameroonian forces.

In August 2022, Nigerian President Muhammadu Buhari emphasized the importance of Chad's stability, highlighting Nigeria's vested interest in its neighbor's peace and security. Buhari underscored the personal relationship with the late Chadian President, Idriss Déby Itno, who kept him regularly informed on Chad's developments.

On 4 November 2024, Chad’s interim President Mahamat Idriss Deby threatened to withdraw from the Multinational Joint Task Force, citing its failure to effectively combat Boko Haram and other militant groups. His remarks followed an attack in late October 2024 that killed around 40 Chadian soldiers. Chad’s withdrawal would significantly weaken the force, as its military is one of the most capable in the region. Established to enhance regional security, the MNJTF has struggled with internal divisions and coordination issues among Nigeria, Niger, Chad, and Cameroon.
