= Amdjarass =

Amdjarass (French: Amdjarass, Arabic: أم جرس) may refer to:

- Amdjarass (city), with a population of 20,850 (2009), in the northeast of Chad, or
- Amdjarass (department), one of the two departments in the province of Ennedi Est.

The city is the capital of both the department and the province.
