= National Front for Democracy and Justice =

- Front de la Nation pour la Démocratie et la Justice au Tchad
- Flag of the National Front for Democracy and Justice
- Leader: Abdallah Chidi Djorkodeï
- Dates active: 25 June 2018–14 December 2023
- Groups: Zaghawa, Toubou
- Active regions: Southern Libya, northern Chad

The National Front for Democracy and Justice (FNDJT, Front de la Nation pour la Démocratie et la Justice au Tchad) is a now defunct Chadian rebel group created on 25 July 2018 by Makaïla Acyl, Allatchi Koukoulé and Adam Tchaemae. It was active during the Insurgency in Chad (2016–present) around the Tibesti region and southern Libya especially near the Libyan city of Murzuk.

== History ==
The FNDJT was created by former Movement for Democracy and Justice in Chad (MDJT) faction leaders Adam Tchaemae and Allatchi Koukoulé and Makaïla Acyl, the son of Chadian rebel Ahmat Acyl. Groups members were mostly former MDJT fighters and came from the Arabic Toubou and Zaghawa ethnic groups. On 28 September 2018 they reportedly seized a 60-member Agence nationale de sécurité (ANS) convoy in the city of Murzuk. On 26 January 2021, the FNDJT claimed to have attacked an military outpost in Kouri Bougoudi from its rear bases in Libya. On 31 May the Chadian army attacked FNDJT and the Military Command Council for the Salvation of the Republic (CCMSR) troops in Kouri Bougoudi, Tibesti region. Chadian forces claimed to have killed 23 rebels and FNDJT claimed to have killed "15 soldiers, including two senior officers" in the fighting.

== Disarmament ==
After a clash in July 2023 in which Chadian forces had launched an attack against a FNDJT forward operating base in Dozo, 80 kilometers from the city of Wour, 300 FNDJT members surrendered to Chadian forces. In a ceremony held on 14 of December one of the groups leaders Allatchi Koukoulé and 500 former FNDJT combatants were officially intregated to the Chadian armed forces.
