= Amdjarass Wind Farm =

Wind farm in Amdjarass, Ennedi-Est, Chad

- Country: Chad
- Location: Amdjarass, Ennedi-Est
- Status: Operational
- Commission date: 2016

Power generation
- Units operational: 4 X 275 kW
- Nameplate capacity: 1.1 MW

The Amdjarass Wind Farm is a 1.1 MW wind farm in Amdjarass, Ennedi-Est, Chad. It is the first wind farm in the country.

== History ==
The wind turbines were erected in February 2016. This was followed by the installation of the farm's energy storage systems, generators and transmission line. The wind farm was finally commissioned by the end of 2016, making it the first wind farm in Chad.

== Technical specifications ==
The wind farm consists of four 275 kW wind turbines. It was constructed by Vergnet.

== See also ==
- List of power stations in Chad
