= Miski, Chad =

Miski
- Location in Chad
- Coordinates: 20°10′N 18°1′E
- Country: Chad
- Region: Borkou
- Department: Emi Koussi
- Sub-Prefecture: Yebbibou

Population (2008)
  - Ethnicities: Teda
- Time zone: +1

Miski is a town in the Tibesti Mountains of northern Chad, in the Yebbibou sub-prefecture of the Emi Koussi department of the Borkou region. The local population has been estimated at no more than 300 families, most of whom are members of the Teda people.

Prior to the national administrative reorganization in 2008, Miski was in the Tibesti Department of the Bourkou-Ennedi-Tibesti region. When that region was abolished, Miski became part of the Tibesti Region, until the region boundary was redrawn in 2018, when Miski became part of the Borkou region.

Since late 2018, the Miski area has been cut off from the outside world by a Chadian military blockade, after the self-defense committee formed to protect Miski against illegal gold miners successfully repelled a military assault.

== Gold mining ==
In 2012, substantial deposits of gold were found in the area around Miski. Illegal gold mining quickly became widespread in the region. As many as 40,000 miners, chiefly Chadian and Sudanese, entered the Miski area.

Numerous officials of the Chadian military were reportedly involved in these illegal mines. In mid-2013, at the local community's request, the Chadian army removed gold miners from the Miski area, but as would occur repeatedly in subsequent years, the miners simply retreated into Libya and later returned. In December 2013, the people of Miski established committees to monitor gold-mining activity in the Miski area. The committees were based on the traditional Teda institution of wangada, village guardians tasked with protecting communal resources. These wangada committees became a model followed by other communities in the Tibesti region facing similar issues with illegal mining.

In July 2015, after wangada Salah Nokur was killed while attempting to confiscate a metal detector from a group of miners, a series of armed clashes took place between the wangada committees and mining groups. An investigative committee sent by the prime minister blamed the clashes on "blatant complicity" between the regional government and illegal miners, and recommended that the governor be replaced. However, this recommendation was not followed.

== Self-defense committee ==
In August 2018, the Chadian government moved region boundaries so that Miski was no longer part of the Tibesti region, where Teda people are a majority; instead, it became part of Borkou region, where the Teda are a minority. Local officials who objected to the change were fired. In response, a local self-defense committee was formed. After a month of fighting between the self-defense committee and the Chadian national army, the army retreated from the town.

Since late 2018, the town has been under continuous siege by the Chadian military, which has set up a perimeter at a 100 km radius around Miski. The Chadian government has closed off numerous wells in the region. The residents of the town have no access to medical care or other outside resources.

In October 2019, there were reports of a renewed Chadian army offensive against Miski. The self-defense committee claimed to have defeated the attack, but there was no comment from the Chadian government.
