= Kaoura =

- Location in Chad
- Coordinates: 16°12′34″N 22°36′03″E
- Country: Chad
- Region: Ennedi (since 2008)
- Department: Ennedi Est
- Sub-Prefecture: Kaoura
- Time zone: +1

Kaoura is a small town in Ennedi Est department of Chad. It is located in the Ennedi Region, which was formed in 2008 from the Ennedi Est and Ennedi Ouest departments of the former Bourkou-Ennedi-Tibesti region. In 2009, the population of Kaoura was 15,093, 8,257 of which were male and 6,836 were female.

== Climate ==
Kaoura is classified by Köppen-Geiger climate classification system as hot desert (BWh). In Kaoura, the average annual temperature is 26.0 °C. The rainfall here averages 112 mm.
