= Vehicle registration plates of Chad =

Republic of Chad/République du Tchad
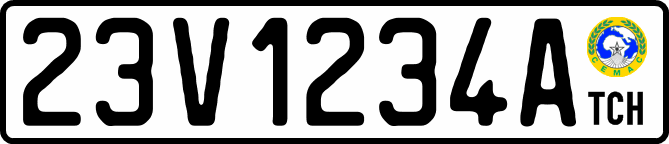
- Chadian regular legal standard number plate.
- Country: Chad
- Country code: TCH

Current series
- Size: 520 mm × 110 mm 20.5 in × 4.3 in
- Serial format: 12A3456B (12 being the regional code)
- Colour (front): Black on white
- Colour (rear): Black on white

The vehicle registration plates of Chad is a legal form requiring the citizens of Chad to have the car registered.

== Regular license plates ==
The current scheme of regular license plates of Chad was introduced in 2001. It is based on the French FNI system and has a format of 12A3456B, where 12 is the region code, A is a vehicle type indicator, 3456 is a number, and B is a series. Regular plates have a white background with black markings. On the right is the emblem of the Central African Economic and Monetary Community (CEMAS) and the TSN code.

=== Regional coding ===
Until 2008, the number of Chad regions was 18. Since 2008, due to the fragmentation of some previous regions, 4 more regions have been added, which are given codes 19–22. In 2012, the Ennedi Region was divided. There is no information about the assignment of the new code 23 yet. The most common number to spot from Chad, is the code 18, which identifies the capital city. Two first numbers in the plates from Chad, identifies the region.

- 01 — Batha
- 02 — Borkou
- 03 — Chari-Baguirmi
- 04 — Guéra
- 05 — Hadjer-Lamis
- 06 — Kanem
- 07 — Lac
- 08 — Logone Occidental
- 09 — Logone Oriental
- 10 — Mandoul
- 11 — Mayo-Kebbi Est
- 12 — Mayo-Kebbi Ouest
- 13 — Moyen-Chari
- 14 — Ouaddaï
- 15 — Salamat
- 16 — Tandjilé
- 17 — Wadi Fira
- 18 — Ndjamena
- 19 — Bahr El Gazel
- 20 — Ennedi
- 21 — Sila
- 22 — Tibesti

=== Coding by type of vehicle ===
- B — bus
- C — heavy passenger car (jeep, minivan, pickup, etc.)
- M — motorcycles
- MS — special motorcycles
- P — freight transport
- S — special transport
- T — freight transport (tractors)
- V — cars

== Other formats ==
=== Taxis ===
Taxis have license plates in a format that coincides with the regular one, i.e. 12A3456B. Character color is white, background color is blue.

=== Temporary license plates ===
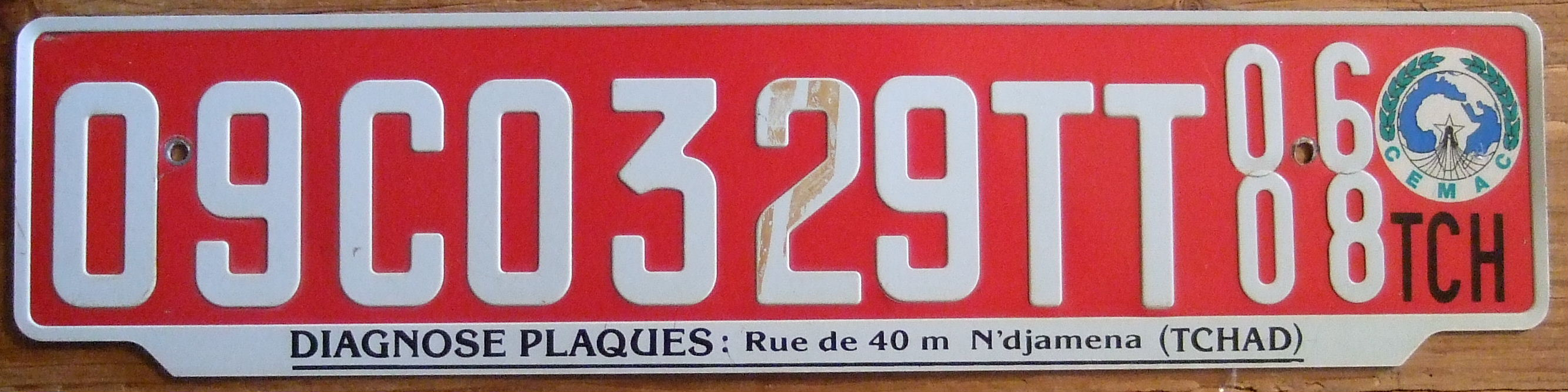
Single row temporary license plates

Temporary license plates for tourists have a red background with white or black symbols. The format of such characters is 12A3456TT, where 12 is the region code, A is the vehicle type indicator, 3456 is the number, TT is the temporality indicator.

=== State license plate ===
State license plates have black symbols on a yellow background and the format AB1234B, where AB is a pointer (type of apparatus), 1234 is a number, and B is a vehicle type code.

=== Police ===
Police license plates have the format PN1234, where PN is a sign (NATIONAL POLICE), 1234 is a number. License plates have white symbols on a red background.

=== Military license plates ===
License plates of the Armed Forces of Chad have the format T12-3456 and are usually applied to the vehicle with paint: black symbols on a yellow background.

=== Gendarmes ===
The license plates of the gendarmes have the format G1 2345. G is the Gendarmerie index. The license plates have black symbols on a yellow background.

=== Diplomatic license plates ===
License plates of diplomatic missions have the format 12CMD34, where 12 - country code, CMD - index of the head of the diplomatic mission, 34 - number.

==== License plates of other diplomats ====
License plates of diplomatic personnel have the format 12A34CD, where 12 is the country code, A is the vehicle type code, 34 is the number, CD is the index of the diplomatic corps.

==== Administrative and technical staff ====
License plates of administrative and technical personnel of diplomatic missions have the format 12РАТ345, where 12 is the country code, РАТ is the index of the corresponding type of staff, 345 is the number.

==== Technical staff of international cooperation missions ====
License plates of this type have the format 12РСТ345, where 12 is the country code, РСТ is the index of the corresponding type of personnel, 345 is the number.

==== Honorary consuls ====
Honorary consuls have license plates of the format ССН12A3456B, where ССН is the index of the honorary consul, 12 is the code of the country, A is the code of the TK type, 3456 is the number, B is the series.
