= Tarso Toh =

Volcano in northern Chad

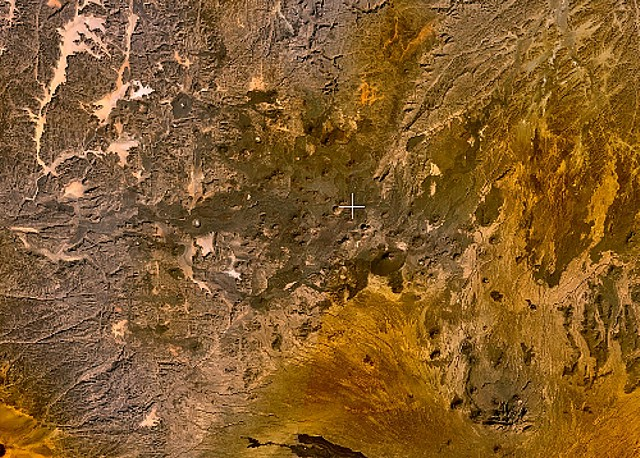
- Satellite image of the Tarso Toh volcanic field.

Highest point
- Elevation: 2,000 m (6,600 ft)
- Coordinates: 21.33°0′0″N 16.33°0′0″E

Geography
- Location within Chad
- Location: Chad
- Parent range: Tibesti Mountains

Geology
- Mountain type: Volcanic field
- Last eruption: Unknown

Tarso Toh (also known as Tarso Toon or Tarson Tôh) is a volcanic field located in Chad, north of Tarso Toussidé volcano. It fills valleys and plains over an area of 80 km in east–west direction and 20–30 km in north–south direction. It contains 150 scoria cones and two maars.

Tarso Toh is a volcanic plateau and has lateral dimensions of 43 by 23 kilometres (27 mi × 14 mi), resulting in a surface area of about 490 square kilometres (190 sq mi). It rises to elevations of 2,065 metres (6,775 ft) above sea level and 1,150 metres (3,770 ft) above the surrounding terrain. The plateau encompasses about 150 separate volcanoes, some of which are found in remnants. Some lava flows at Tarso Toh have reached large distances.

Part of the field is the Begour crater. It is about 800 metres (0.5 mi) wide and is mostly dry with the exception of several small ponds and a ring of diatom- and mollusc-containing sediments which forms a ring terrace inside the crater. Radiocarbon dating has yielded ages of 8,300 ± 300 years ago on sediments within Begour, and Tarso Toh is considered to be a Holocene volcano.

The Tibesti features several different rock formations. A crystalline basement is covered by Mesozoic sandstones. These were subject to deformation and later overprinted by volcanic rocks. This basement is about 500-600 million years old. The recent volcanism has been explained with the existence of a mantle plume beneath Tibesti.

== Climate and biota ==
The climate of the region is arid but in general there is more precipitation than in the surrounding desert, which results in the formation of wadis. Temperatures at Zouar (730 metres (2,400 ft) elevation) range from −1–10 °C (30–50 °F) in winter to 24–41 °C (75–105 °F) in summer; at high altitudes freezing temperatures may be common.

Vegetation is scarce; in the proximity of waters some acacias and grasses can be found. A number of mollusc shells have been found in the Begour sediments, such as Anisus costulatus, Anisus dallonii, Biomphalaria pfeifferi, Bulinus truncatus, Gastrocopta klunzingeri, Lymnaea natalensis, Melanoides tuberculata, Pisidium sp. Segmentina angusta, Succinea sp., Thapsia vestii and Zootecus insularis, although their identification is now always clear.

== See also ==
- List of volcanoes in Chad
- List of volcanic fields
- Tarso Toon, an unrelated volcano
