= Toussidé =

Stratovolcano in Chad

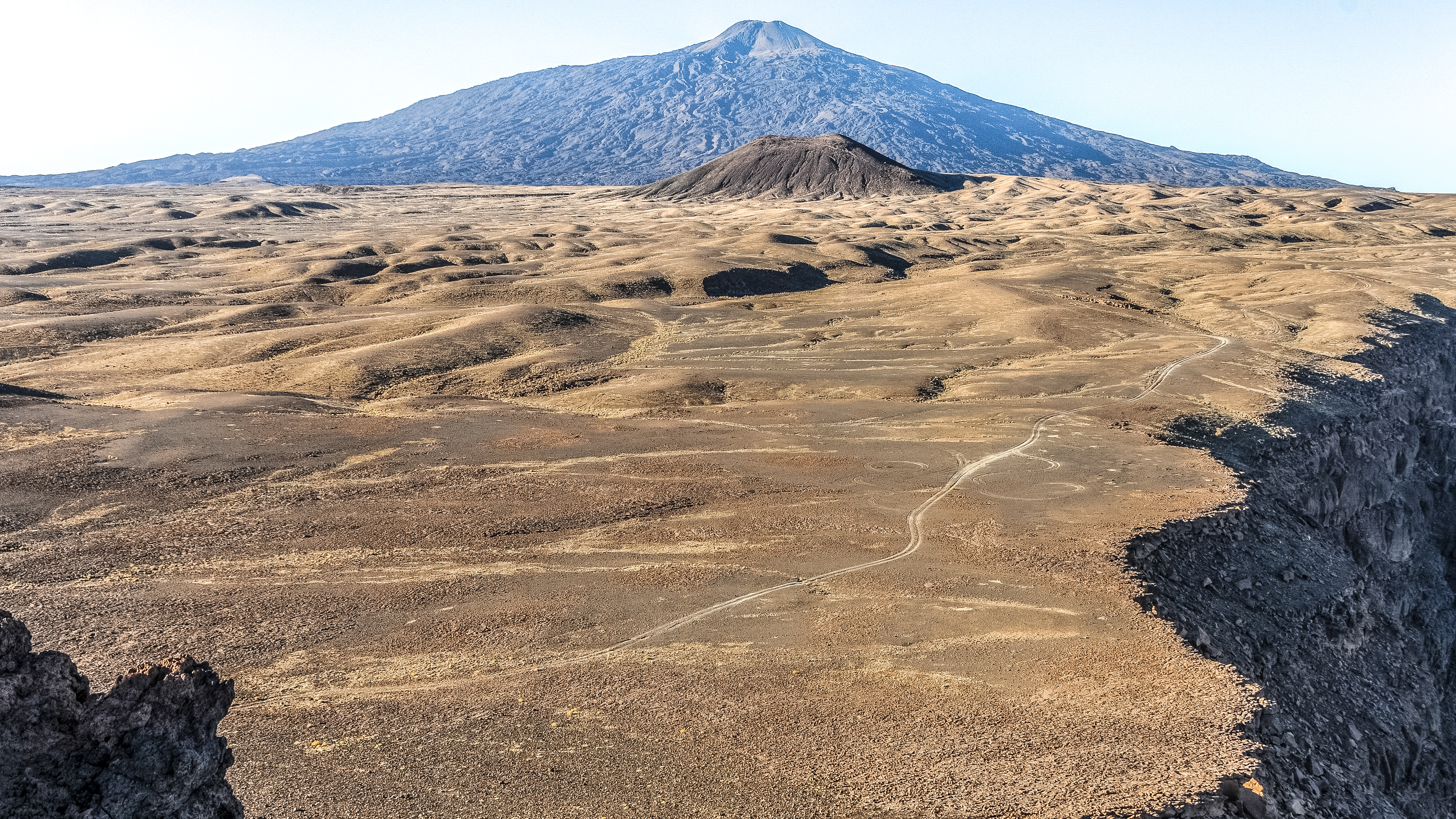

Highest point
- Elevation: 3,302 m (10,833 ft)
- Coordinates: 21°02′27″N 16°28′25″E

Geography
- Location within Chad
- Location: Tibesti Region, Chad
- Parent range: Tibesti Mountains

Geology
- Mountain type: Stratovolcano
- Last eruption: unknown

Toussidé (also known as Tarso Toussidé) is a potentially active stratovolcano in Chad. Toussidé lies in the Tibesti Mountains; the large Yirrigué caldera and the smaller Trou au Natron and Doon Kidimi craters are close to it. It has an elevation of 3,302 m (10,833 ft) above sea level. The volcano is the source of a number of lava flows, which have flowed westward away from Toussidé and east into the Yirrigué caldera.

Trou au Natron, the depression southeast of the volcano, measures approximately 8 by 6 kilometres (5.0 mi × 3.7 mi) in diameter and 700–1,000 metres (2,300–3,300 ft) in depth. During the Last Glacial Maximum or the early-middle Holocene, it was filled with a lake. A number of volcanic cones have developed within Trou au Natron. Fumarolic activity on the peak of Toussidé and geothermal manifestations within Trou au Natron represent signs of volcanic activity at Toussidé.

== Names ==
Toussidé is also known as Tarso Toussidé. Another transliteration is "Tusside". "Trou au Natron" refers to the springs which have deposited white trona in the caldera. "Toussidé" translates as "Which killed the local people (Tou) with fire".

== Geography and geomorphology ==
=== Regional ===
Toussidé is part of the western Tibesti mountains in Chad, Africa. The Tibesti mountains reach elevations of 3 kilometres (1.9 mi) and are surrounded by the Sahara. The towns of Bardai and Zouar lie east-northeast and south of Toussidé, respectively, and a road between the two passes just southeast from Trou au Natron.

Another volcano in Tibesti is Emi Koussi, which is the highest mountain of the Tibesti and of the entire Sahara region. The volcano Tarso Toh lies northwest of Toussidé, and the Botoum and Botoudoma/Petit Botoum rhyolite extrusions are located 10 kilometres (6.2 mi) south of Trou au Natron. The origin of volcanism in Tibesti is unclear; both a hotspot-related mechanism and tectonic effects of the collision between the African Plate and the Eurasian Plate have been proposed.

=== Local ===
Toussidé is a symmetrical 3,265-metre-high (10,712 ft) stratovolcano, the second-highest peak in Tibesti and the highest peak in the western Tibesti mountains. In the past it was considered to be lower, only 2,500 metres (8,200 ft), before a higher summit height was determined by Jean Tilho and W.G. Tweedale (1920). It rises 1,000 metres (3,300 ft) above the surrounding landscape and covers a base of 8 by 9 kilometres (5.0 mi × 5.6 mi), dominating the surroundings. The summit cone is formed by lapilli, pyroclastics, and scoria. One half has a white colour and the other half is black; some areas are white from fumarolic alteration. Lava flows emanate from Toussidé in a radial pattern and reach lengths of 25 kilometres (16 mi), covering an area of 200 square kilometres (77 sq mi). These flows descended valleys towards the west and may have buried an older volcanic edifice of Toussidé. The flows have a ropy appearance with a diverse surface texture, including bubbly, glassy, and porphyric textures, which are very fresh and free of erosion. The surface of the flows is rough and can be a problem to climbers. The relatively steep slopes of Toussidé may reflect the existence of a lava dome underneath the younger lavas; some flows may have originated from parasitic vents.

Toussidé itself lies in part within an even larger caldera, the 14-by-13-kilometre (8.7 mi × 8.1 mi) "pre-Toussidé" (also known as "Yirrigué") caldera which is in part filled by the lava flows from Toussidé and eruption products from the more recent explosion craters, as well as debris that fell from the steep caldera margin. Toussidé is located on the caldera's western side, and the smaller Trou au Natron caldera cuts into the flanks of Yirrigué. Yirrigué contains a small cinder cone and an associated one-kilometre-long (0.62 mi) lava flow, as well as an alluvial plain. The "Yirrigué" caldera is part of a large, rhyolitic, shield-shaped volcano that developed atop a tectonic horst, which in turn may have been formed by intrusion of magmas. The ignimbrites have buried older terrain and filled valleys.

Southeast of Toussidé lies the 8-by-6-kilometre (5.0 mi × 3.7 mi) caldera Trou au Natron (also known as Doon or Doon Orei). Its 700–1,000-metre-high (2,300–3,300 ft) rim is cut into sequences of lavas and older volcanic cones. In places it is almost vertical. Inside of Trou au Natron are four recent basaltic volcanic cones, the most remarkable of which is the 75-metre-high (246 ft) Moussosomi, which has erupted a lava flow. Three of these cones are deeply eroded. Cones are also located outside of the Trou au Natron, and their eruption products have in part flowed into the crater. Like Toussidé, the position of Trou au Natron appears to be controlled by the ring fault of the "pre-Toussidé" caldera. A salty swamp lies within Trou au Natron, whose floor is in part covered by evaporites, mainly sodium sulfate.

Another 1,500-metre-wide (4,900 ft) and 300-metre-deep (980 ft) crater, Doon Kidimi (also known as Petit Trou or Doon Kinimi), lies northeast of Trou au Natron; it is among the most pristine volcanic features in the region. Additional volcanoes in the neighbourhood are the 3,040-metre-high (9,970 ft) Ehi Timi to the northeast and the 2,515-metre-high (8,251 ft) Ehi Sosso/Ehi Soso east of Toussidé, the former of which features lava domes. The river Enneri Oudingueur originates closely in the area and becomes a tributary of the Enneri Bardagué, which drains the Tibesti northward.

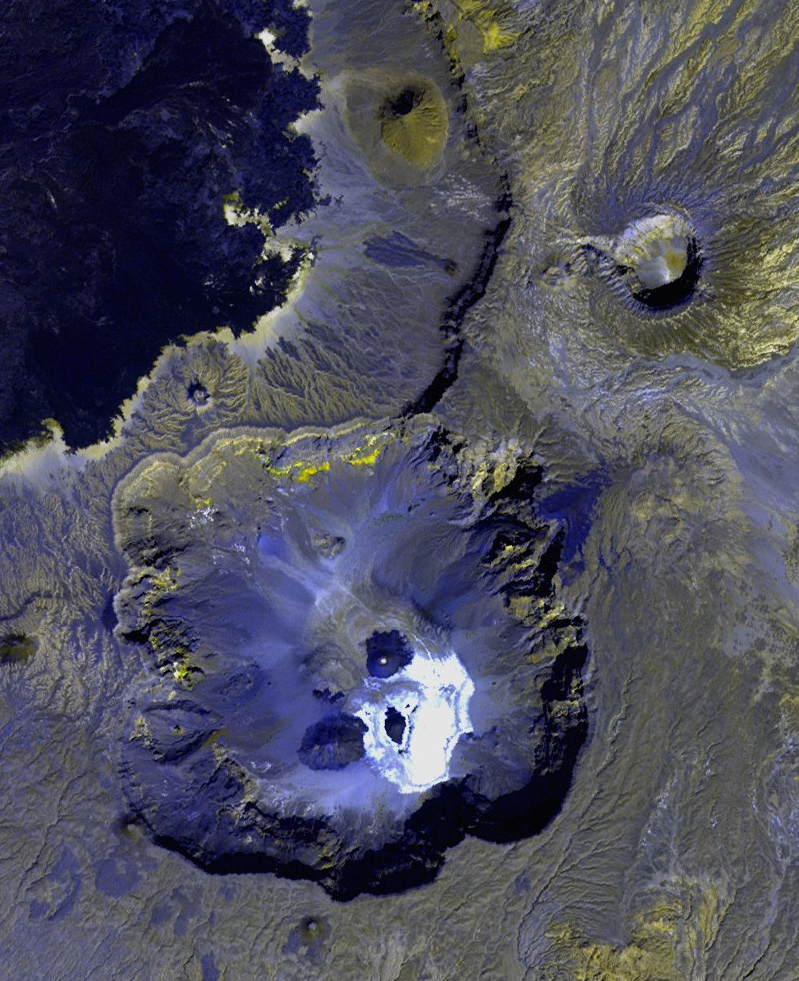
Trou au Natron (centre down) and Doon Kidimi (upper right corner)

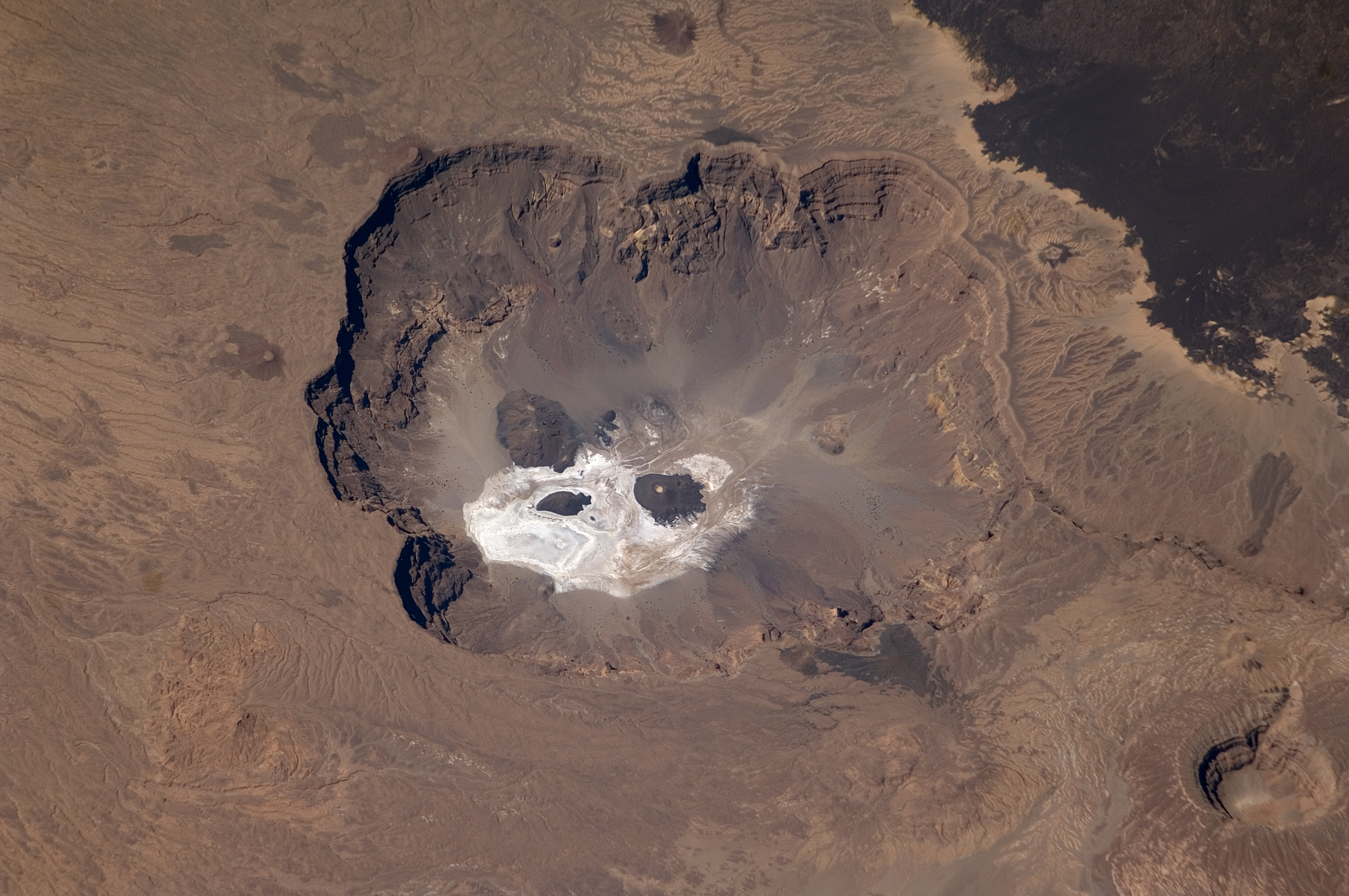
Trou au Natron seen from northeast; Toussidé lava flows upper right corner and Doon Kidimi lower right corner

=== Paleolake ===
Trou Au Natron was once filled by a freshwater lake during the Last Glacial Maximum. Fed by meltwater from snow, this lake persisted for several thousands of years. Aside from a lake level drop 14,900–14,600 years before present, the lake existed until about 12,400 years before present. Later analysis suggested that there was no late Pleistocene lake stage and that Trou au Natron was filled with water between 8,645 calibrated radiocarbon years ago to about 4,425 calibrated radiocarbon years ago, thus at the same time as lakes in the lowland. Charophyte algae (such as Chara globularis and Chara vulgaris), diatoms, gastropods, golden algae, sponges, and stromatoliths lived in the lake. Ferns and mosses colonized the margins of the crater.

The lake reached maximum depths of at a minimum 300–350 metres (980–1,150 ft), at least once reaching 500 metres (1,600 ft). Such a large size, relative to its catchment, has raised the question of where this water came from. The formation of such a lake during the glacial maximum was probably dependent on orographic precipitation transported by the subtropical jet stream.

== Geology ==
The Tibesti Mountains are part of a volcanic province that reaches from Libya into Chad and covers a total surface area of about 100,000 square kilometres (39,000 sq mi). The Tibesti Mountains have been volcanically active since the late Cenozoic, with one old volcanic unit being dated to 17 million years ago. While all the higher peaks are volcanoes, not all of Tibesti is formed by volcanic material; the volcanoes have developed on top of a basement uplift.

The terrain beneath Toussidé is formed by Precambrian schists and sandstones, including the Nubian Sandstone. A thick layer of ash has covered much of the terrain and, with the exception of the younger volcanoes, only few parts of the terrain crop out. Several of these outcrops can be found east of Trou au Natron. The volcanism of the Tibesti has been subdivided into several series.

The volcano has erupted rhyolite, trachybasalt bordering on trachyandesite, which define a subalkaline/hyperalkaline suite. The lavas contain phenocrysts of augite, olivine, plagioclase, and sanidine. The cones in Trou au Natron are andesitic. Yirrigué conversely has erupted peralkaline rhyolite, while Ehi Timi erupted rhyolite and trachyte, and Ehi Sosso only rhyolite. The formation of Trou au Natron has been accompanied by the eruption of bedrock material.

== Climate and vegetation ==
Annual temperatures at Trou au Natron fluctuate between 27 and −8 °C (81 and 18 °F), with a daily temperature variation of 8.8 °C (15.8 °F); this is less than in the lowlands. At higher altitudes frost can be expected. Precipitation amounts to 93.3 millimetres per year (3.67 in/year) at Trou au Natron. Most of it falls as frontal precipitation during summer, and it is more copious than in the lowlands; the Tibesti mountains are the sources for wadis. Other, more indirect estimates yield precipitation of 150–250 millimetres (5.9–9.8 in) per year at Toussidé.

A characteristic vegetation has been discovered on the fumaroles of Toussidé. It ranges from cyanophyceae, ferns, mosses, Oldenlandia and Selaginella within the fumarole vents to small meadows consisting of mosses and Campanula monodiana, Fimbristylis minutissima, Lavandula antineae, Mollugo nudicaulis, Oxalis corniculata, Satureja biflora, and other species. The growth of these plants is favoured by the water emanating from the fumaroles. The plant Erodium toussidanum is endemic at the fumaroles of Toussidé, and the mountain is the type locality of Salvia tibestiensis. Trou au Natron also has its own unique flora, including many Sahelian species.

== Eruption history ==
Volcanic activity at Toussidé appears to be of Quaternary age. The "pre-Toussidé" caldera is considered to be the source of numerous local ignimbrites, including the 430,000 ± 110,000-year-old Yirrigué ignimbrite. This ignimbrite covers a surface area of 3,200 square kilometres (1,200 sq mi) with about 150 cubic kilometres (36 cu mi) of rock. The eruption that generated this ignimbrite also led to the formation of the Yirrigué caldera.

Trou au Natron probably formed through two or three separate phreatic eruptions that deposited large blocks around the crater, while an alternative proposal that considers it a collapse caldera appears to not be consistent with field evidence. It formed after the "pre-Toussidé" caldera considering that its caldera rim is cut by Trou au Natron, at a time where part of the Toussidé volcano already existed, but before the Würm glaciation. Doon Kidimi on the other hand may have formed during the Neolithic Subpluvial, and after Trou au Natron.

Toussidé is among the youngest volcanoes in Tibesti, and may have erupted in historical time. A large number of fumaroles are active on its summit, exhaling mainly water vapour at temperatures of 40–60 °C (104–140 °F); thus it is considered to be the only active Tibesti volcano. Likewise, the volcanic cones in Trou au Natron are considered to be recent; lake deposits underneath the cones have been radiocarbon-dated to be between 15,000 and 12,500 years old. Finally, in Trou au Natron there are hot springs that deposit trona and fumarolic activity has been reported there.

== See also ==
- List of volcanoes in Chad
- List of Ultras of Africa

== Other sources ==
- National Aeronautics and Space Administration
- Heseltine, Nigel (1960). From Libyan sands to Chad. Museum Press.
- High-resolution NASA photograph
