= Bardaï-Zougra Airport =

Airport in Tibesti, Chad

Bardai-Zougra Airport
- IATA: none; ICAO: FTTZ

Summary
- Airport type: joint public/military
- Owner: Government
- Serves: Bardai
- Location: Chad
- Elevation AMSL: 3,524 ft / 1,074 m
- Coordinates: 21°27′4.3″N 017°3′34.2″E

Map
- Location of Bardai-Zougra Airport in Chad

Runways
Direction	Length		Surface
Direction	ft	m	Surface
07/25	7,010	2,137	Dirt
- Source: Landings.com

Bardai-Zougra Airport (ICAO: FTTZ) is a joint public/military airport located near Bardai, Tibesti, Chad.

== See also ==
- List of airports in Chad
