= List of volcanoes in Chad =

This is a list of active and extinct volcanoes in Chad.

Name	Elevation		Location	Last eruption
Name	meters	feet	Coordinates	Last eruption
Abeki	2450	8036	21.1°N 17.0°E	-
Emi Koussi	3415	11,204	19.80°N 18.53°E	Holocene
Oyoye	2230	7314	20.49°N 17.32°E	-
Tarso Toh	2000	6562	21.33°N 16.33°E	Holocene
Tarso Toon	2575	8448	21.07°N 17.62°E	-
Tarso Voon	3100	10,170	20.92°N 17.28°E	Holocene
Tarso Yega	2500	8200	20.36°N 17.24°E	-
Tieroko	2910	9545	20.4°N 17.51°E	-
Toussidé	3265	10,712	21.03°N 16.45°E	Holocene
