= Insurgency in Chad (2016–present) =

Ongoing war in Chad

- Map of Chad
Date	2016 – present (9–10 years)
Location	Mainly northern regions of Chad, with spillovers at Central African Republic–Chad border
Status	Ongoing; Idriss Déby is killed in action, during the Northern Chad offensive; Mahamat Déby Itno becomes his successor, establishes himself as the Chairman of the Transitional Military Council (TMC), and dissolves the Chadian parliament; Ceasefire agreement signed between TMC and 42 rebel groups in August 2022

Belligerents
Chad; France (until 2025, since 2026); Central African Republic (2023); JEM	FACT; CCMSR; UFR; FNDJT; MDJT; UFDD; FPRN; FPR; MRST; RPJET; MPRD; Miski Martyrs Battalion; (At least 47 rebel groups overall)

Commanders and leaders
(Chad) Idriss Déby †; (Chad) Mahamat Déby	Mahamat Mahdi Ali; Timane Erdimi; Ousman Dillo

Strength
Unknown	c. 7,000 overall (2023)

Casualties and losses
Unknown	More than 300 rebels
- 644 deaths in total (by July 2022)

In 2016, the Front for Change and Concord in Chad (FACT) and the Military Command Council for the Salvation of the Republic (CCMSR) began a rebellion against the Chadian government. From their rear bases in southern Libya, FACT and CCMSR have launched offensives and raids into Northern Chad seeking to overthrow the government of former president Idriss Déby, who had been in power since a December 1990 coup. Other rebel groups are also involved in the insurgency, though to a lesser extent.

In 2021, Idriss Déby was killed during a major rebel offensive. Despite this, the insurgents were ultimately repelled and Mahamat Déby Itno rose to succeed his father as ruler of Chad. Though a ceasefire agreement was signed by many insurgent groups in August 2022, this failed to fully contain the uprising. By 2024, the insurgency was ongoing in the north and had spread to the border of the Central African Republic.

== Background ==
Historically, Chad has suffered from a large number of civil wars, foreign conflicts, and coups since its independence from France in 1958. Idriss Déby seized the Chadian presidency in a military coup in 1990. Since then, he enjoyed backing by both France and China. Déby's government was able to repeatedly defeat rebellions against his rule. Militant opposition groups were eventually driven from the country into exile. After the end of the Chadian Civil War (2005–2010), Chadian insurgents were forced to leave their old bases in Sudan. Many consequently moved into Libya which fell into unrest from 2011 due to the First Libyan Civil War.

In 2014, the Second Libyan Civil War broke out. Several Chadian rebel groups consequently became mercenaries in service of various Libyan factions, receiving money and weaponry to prepare for their return to Chad.

== Insurgency ==
=== Emergence of new rebel groups and battles for Kouri Bougoudi ===
Two new Chadian rebel groups, FACT and the CCMSR, were organized in southern Libya in 2016 and aided local groups in return for money, equipment, and other support. FACT initially became allied to a Misrata-based faction. By 2017, the Chadian intelligence believed that rebels led by Timane Erdimi, a nephew and long-time opponent of Idriss Déby, were gathering weapons in southern Libya.

In July 2017, the CCMSR launched an offensive on Kouri Bougoudi seeking to seize control of the region and its lucrative mines. These assaults were ultimately repelled by the Chadian government although the CCMSR claimed to have launched a second attack in August 2017 which the Chadian government denied took place. In September, Chad severed diplomatic relations with Qatar, accusing it of attempting to destabilize the country. Journalist Ben Taub suspected that this development was related to Qatar harboring Timane Erdimi who was still trying to overthrow Déby.

By fall, fighting between government loyalists and insurgents grew more frequent along the Chadian-Libyan border. Déby responded by relocating hundreds of Chadian soldiers who had been sent to fight against Boko Haram to the north.

On 11 August 2018, CCMSR launched a major attack on the military outpost at Kouri Bougoudi in the Tibesti Mountains, later claiming to have killed 73 and captured 45 soldiers while suffering just 11 casualties (4 dead, 7 wounded). The Chadian government initially attempted to deny that the attack had taken place, and then downplayed its significance. While the CCMSR offered to release its prisoners in return for the release of imprisoned rebel leaders, the Chadian government refused to negotiate with "savage mercenaries, bandits [and] thugs", and instead ordered local miners to abandon their camp at Kouri Bougoudi. The military subsequently retreated from the area on 22 August, leaving it to the CCMSR and illegal miners. From then on, the Chadian Air Force launched several bombing raids in the region, targeting the Kouri Bougoudi mining camp and camel herds, killing several civilians and depriving locals of their livelihood. Meanwhile, the CCMSR continued its attacks against government positions, such as at Tarbou in Tibesti Region (21 September), and Miski in Borkou Region (24 October). Some locals criticised the CCMSR of exploiting and worsening ethnic tensions in the Tibesti Mountains.

=== Minor rebel incursions ===
On 12 January 2019, a Sudanese armed group, the Justice and Equality Movement, crossed the border with Libya with dozens of vehicles and attacked CCSMR positions in Kouri Bougoudi. According to JEM 67 of its fighters were killed while CCSMR reported three dead and 12 wounded. On 3–6 February, the French Air Force conducted airstrikes on Union of Resistance Forces (UFR) troops who had launched a raid into Chad. On 9 February 2019, the Chadian army claimed to have captured 250 rebels including four leaders and destroyed forty vehicles. French Foreign Minister Jean-Yves Le Drian explained the operation by claiming that France had acted "to prevent a coup d'etat".

In addition, FACT switched its allies in Libya in 2019, aligning itself with Khalifa Haftar. The group relocated to Al Jufra Airbase, where it received training and equipment in return for its aid to Haftar's campaigns. The base also harbored mercenaries of the Russian Wagner Group, former Blackwater associates, and troops of the United Arab Emirates Armed Forces.

=== Death of Idriss Déby and national dialogue ===
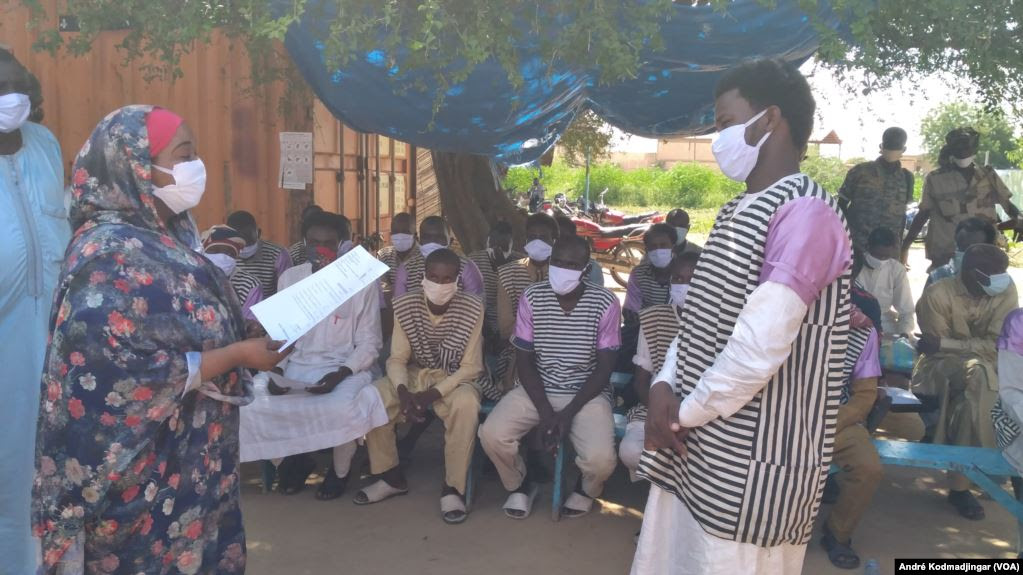
Chadian government representatives announce an amnesty for ex-rebels and political prisoners in late 2021

In early 2020, Haftar's Western Libya campaign failed to capture Tripoli, ultimately resulting in a ceasefire agreement in Libya. As a result, several Chadian rebel groups became free to resume their long-held plan to return to Chad. On 26 January 2021, 50 FNDJT rebels on 20 4x4 vehicles attacked Post 35 in Kouri Bougoudi 40 km south of border with Libya.

On 11 April 2021, FACT launched an offensive in Tibesti Region in the north of the country following the 2021 Chadian presidential election. President Idriss Déby was killed during the offensive on 20 April. Despite this success, the rebel offensive ultimately failed, and the government claimed victory on 9 May 2021. The Chadian presidency passed to Mahamat Déby, the son of Idriss Déby. He established the Transitional Military Council (TMC) as new governing authority, and initially refused to negotiate with insurgent groups.

Déby softened his stance in August 2021, proposing a national dialogue with the rebels. FACT expressed interest in the proposal. The discussion between the government and insurgents started in October, overseen by ex-President Goukouni Oueddei. The CCMSR and FNDJT confirmed their participation. On 29 November, the Chadian government announced an amnesty for 296 rebels and political dissidents. In January 2022, more opposition figures were released by the Chadian government.

In the following month, the TMC junta accused the UFR of trying to enlist the Wagner Group to aid them in the insurgency. In doing so, UFR leader Timane Erdimi was allegedly using middlemen in the Central African Republic. In March 2022, further peace talks were held in Doha, involving Déby's regime and several rebel groups, including FACT, MDJT, and UFDD. The peace talks made little significant progress, however, while the insurgents maintained their presence in the country's north. Amid internal disagreements, the CCMSR left the negotiations in May. In the same month, gold miners in Tibesti clashed in a battle which left over one hundred people dead; CCMSR and FACT subsequently accused the government of negligence regarding communal violence. Over 20 rebel groups officially pulled out of the Doha talks in mid-July 2022. At least some of these subsequently resumed negotiations, and a "majority" of the active insurgent factions agreed to sign a peace agreement later that month. However, some of the most powerful rebel groups including FACT refused to sign the agreement unless the government made more concessions. On 7 August 2022, Chad's military government signed a deal with 42 opposition groups. Five other rebel factions –including FACT– refused to join the agreement. UFR leader Timane Erdimi subsequently returned to Chad, officially to support the implementation of the National Dialogue.

In late August 2022, CCMSR declared that it had killed ten soldiers in Wouri district, northern Tibesti Region. Chadian government officials admitted that rebels had made an incursion into the country, though denied the deaths of security forces. In October, the Chadian government violently suppressed public protests in a crackdown that killed 200 people. This caused numerous opposition leaders to return to exile, and undermined the willindness of still-fighting insurgents to lay down arms. No one was held accountable for the civilians' deaths.

=== Renewed intensification of fighting ===
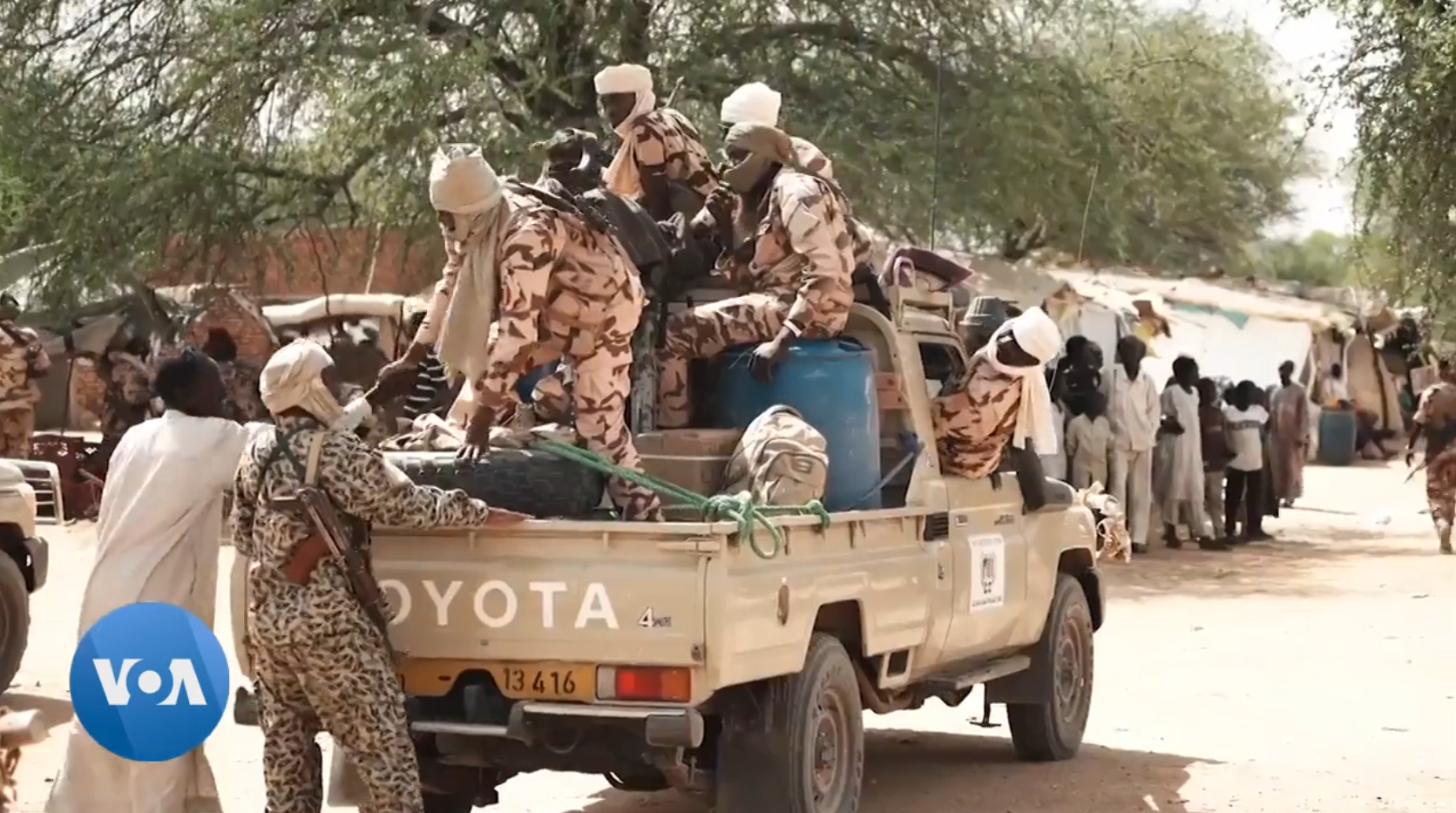
Chadian soldiers oversee Sudanese refugees in May 2023

By 2023, about 7,000 Chadian rebels were still active, scattered across Sudan, Libya, Niger, and Chad itself. In January 2023, a new insurgent group was founded at the Central African Republic–Chad border. Calling itself the "Revolution Movement for Southern Chad" (MRST), it claimed to have thousands of members and requested Russian support for its operations. Meanwhile, the Chadian government signed a peace agreement with a self-defence group based in Miski; the militia had previously fought against state control of the local gold mines. In March, 400 captured rebels were sentenced to life imprisonment by a Chadian court; however, Mahamat Déby Itno pardoned 380 of them.

In May 2023, rebels were battling the Chadian military in the Tibesti region as well as at the border to the Central Africa Republic. At the same time, unrest grew in Chad's eastern regions due to a mass influx of refugees fleeing the civil war in Sudan. In southern Chad, a number of deadly attacks and cattle raids were carried out by groups operating from the Central African Republic. In response, the Chadian military cooperated with security forces of the neighboring state to destroy two rebels camps around Paoua. Though the Chadian government described the Paoua camps as belonging to "bandits", journalists identified them as likely bases of the MRST and the RPJET insurgent groups. Despite the joint operation, armed militants continued to carry out cross-border raids from the Central African Republic. In general, southern Chad was affected by growing tensions between farmers and cattle herders, resulting in a number of deadly intercommunal clashes.

In August 2023, FACT accused the Chadian military of bombing one of its bases and declared the ceasefire deal to be over. The Chadian government responded by claiming that FACT had initiated hostilities by crossing the Chadian-Libyan border. Meanwhile, the Popular Front for Recovery (FPR) declared that it was siding with FACT and called on all "patriotic forces" to launch a unified "national uprising" against Déby. The CCMSR also launched new attacks in northern Chad. In the same month, Haftar's Libyan National Army attacked Chadian insurgent positions in Libya, mainly at Umm al-Araneb in Murzuq District; the identity of the targeted insurgent group(s) was unclear.

In January 2024, Chadian security forces arrested 80 military officers. The men, led by Lt. Kouroumta Levana Guelemi, had reportedly formed a group called "M3M" and planned an "insurrection" and/or coup d'état. In May, a group of prisoners were released from CCMSR custody in Niger under disputed circumstances; the 21 Chadian soldiers had been captured by rebels in 2023 and taken to Libya. Russian media claimed that the group had been freed during a "joint Chad-Russia operation" against "Islamists", while the CCMSR stated that Russian officials had arranged the prisoners' release in exchange for providing the rebel group with equipment. By November, Ousman Dillo -brother of deceased opposition politician Yaya Dillo Djérou- had organized a Zaghawa rebel group and was waging a campaign from across the Sudanese border. In December 2024, Chad held controversial parliamentary elections which saw widespread boycotts and unrest, as supporters of "opposition and civil society groups" attacked election caravans of the Chadian National Election Management Agency across the country. Officials requested military protection for polling stations.

In January 2025, Chadian rebels clashed with the Sudanese Rapid Support Forces (RSF) at Hadjar Fatna inside the Central African Republic. Two insurgent leaders, Ali Massar and Abakar, were killed during the fighting. Furthermore, another Chadian rebel commander, Atahir Moussa, had defected to the RSF alongside his militia. In the same month, an armed group unsuccessfully attacked the presidential palace in N'Djamena. Foreign Minister Abderaman Koulamallah attributed the attack to an unidentified rebel group, local civilians suspected a failed coup attempt, while Agence France-Presse held Boko Haram responsible.

In September 2025, several Tibesti self-defense groups agreed to join a peace agreement with the Chadian government. Members of one local armed group, the Diffa Al Watan Popular Committee, were supposed to be integrated into the Chadian security forces after undergoing additional training. However, local tensions continued, and Chadian soldiers shot three young men in Miski on 4 October, resulting in renewed violence. Dissatisfied locals created the new "Miski Martyrs Battalion" on 5 October to resume the battle against pro-government forces for the gold mines of Tibesti. On 19 October, the CCMSR and Movement for Peace, Reconstruction and Development (Mouvement Populaire pour la Renaissance et le Developpement, MPRD) announced a new rebel alliance. Seven days later, FACT organized a meeting of 20 rebel and civil society groups in France, with the attendees vowing to unite to topple the Déby government. In December, the CCMSR announced that it was leaving southern Libya and returning to northern Chad.

In January 2026, the Chadian military reportedly approached MPRD positions at the border to the Central African Republic after ordering the local insurgents to surrender. In response, MPRD rebels ambushed a column of government troops at Korbol, killing three soldiers and wounding 10 at the cost of three dead and two injured insurgents.

== Role of foreign forces ==
=== Pro-government ===
Until 2025, the Chadian government was mainly backed by French forces which have traditionally a substantial presence in the country. The French troops often fought alongside the Chadian military, and the French Air Force provided government forces with air support during the insurgency. By 2023, Chad had become one of few remaining French allies in the Sahel, as various other regional states had evicted long-standing French garrisons. In November 2024, the Chadian government suddenly terminated the long-standing French military cooperation, with the local French forces gradually retreating from the country from December 2024 to early 2025. China has also supplied Chad with weaponry. In 2023, Central African Republic's security forces cooperated with the Chadian military during anti-rebel operations; as the relations between the two states have been historically strained, this was seen as unusual by journalists.

Having signed a security agreement with the Chadian government in 2023, Hungary announced in 2024 that it would deploy 200 soldiers to Chad to train and assist local security forces in their operations against insurgents. However, the approval of this deployment stalled amid debates within the Chadian National Assembly, while President Déby also had not openly backed the proposal. Speculations regarding the military mission resurfaced amid debates surrounding the 2026 Hungarian parliamentary election, alleging that it was still being planned and supposed to be led by Gáspár Orbán, son of Hungarian Prime Minister Viktor Orbán. In response, Hungarian Defense Minister Kristóf Szalay-Bobrovniczky denied that a mission to Chad was being prepared at all.

=== Anti-government ===
The role of foreign support for the insurgents is unclear, but it is widely suspected by researchers and local governments that various foreign actors are involved in the rebellion. Various Chadian rebel groups are known to occasionally ally with the Libyan forces of Khalifa Haftar; thus, Haftar's troops may have provided the insurgents with training and equipment. However, there have also been open clashes between Haftar's forces and some Chadian rebels. Furthermore, the Al Jufra Airbase in Libya was supplied by the United Arab Emirates during its occupation by Chadian rebels. Mercenaries belonging to the Wagner Group have been spotted at the base, alongside former as well as current Blackwater members. In 2023, the United States intelligence leaked documents according to which the Wagner Group was cooperating with Hemedti, head of the Sudanese RSF, to recruit and train Chadian rebels in the Central African Republic with the ultimate goal of overthrowing the Chadian government. By late 2024, the Chadian government was accusing Sudan of supporting Ousman Dillo's rebel group.
