= Zouar Airport =

- IATA: none; ICAO: FTTR

Summary
- Airport type: Public
- Serves: Zouar
- Location: Chad
- Elevation AMSL: 2,654 ft / 809 m
- Coordinates: 20°26′56.4″N 016°34′14.0″E

Map
- Location of Zouar Airport in Chad

Runways
| Direction | Length | | Surface |
| Direction | ft | m | Surface |
|---|---|---|---|
| 13/31 | 4,390 | 1,338 | Grass |
- Source: Landings.com

Zouar Airport (ICAO: FTTR) is a public use airport located near Zouar, Tibesti, Chad.

== See also ==
- List of airports in Chad
