= Yebbibou =

- Sub-prefecture and village
- Location in Chad
- Coordinates: 20°58′N 18°4′E
- Country: Chad

Aerial view of Yebbibou

Yebbibou (also spelled Yebbi-Bou and Yébibou) is a sub-prefecture and village in the Tibesti Region in Chad.

As of the 2009 Chadian national census, the Yebbibou sub-prefecture had a population of 3,859.

== History ==
The locality was a site of conflict in December 1986 during the Libyan-Chadian border war. From 1994 onwards, Yebbibou (along with Zouar) hosted a Chadian National Gendarmerie brigade.

Prior to the administrative reorganization of Chad on August 10, 2018, Yebbibou served as the seat of a sub-prefecture within the Eastern Tibesti department.

== Geography and economy ==
Yebbibou is located in the heart of the Tibesti Mountains. The village is situated on a cliff with a large palm grove planted at the bottom of a valley (wadi). Towns in Yebbibou sub-prefecture, in addition to Yebbibou itself, include Miski.

The local economy is based on the cultivation of dates and barley.
