= Northern Chad offensive =

Northern Chad offensive may refer to:

- The 2021 Northern Chad offensive, initiated by the Chadian rebel group Front for Change and Concord in Chad (FACT), between 11 April and 9 May 2021
- The 2016 insurgency by FACT and the Military Command Council for the Salvation of the Republic (CCMSR)
- The 1978-1987 Chadian–Libyan conflict, fought between Libyan and allied Chadian forces against Chadian groups supported by France
