= Wadi Hawar =

Department of Ennedi-Est, Chad

- Department
- Location in Chad
- Country: Chad
- Region: Ennedi-Est

Wadi Hawar is a department in the Ennedi-Est region of the Republic of Chad.

== History ==
In an earlier incarnation, Wadi Hawar was a department of the former Ennedi Region in Chad. It was created by Order No. 002 / PR / 08 of 19 February 2008. Its chief town was Amdjarass. It was dissolved in 2012 and replaced by the Ennedi-Est region.

== Subdivisions ==
The department is divided into 6 sub-prefectures:

- Amdjarass
- Bourdani
- Bao
- Bahai
- Kaoura
- Djouna

== Administration ==
List of administrators :

Prefect of Wadi Hawar (since 2008)

- October 9, 2008: Ali Nour Guedemi
- Sougour Mahamat Galama
- November 3, 2009 : Issaka Hassan Jogoi.
