= Youssouf Togoïmi =

Chadian politician (1953–2002)

Minister of the Interior
- In office 21 May 1997 – 3 June 1997

Minister of Defense
- In office 1995–1997

Minister of Justice
- In office 1990–1993

Personal details
- Born: 26 March 1953 Zouar, French Chad
- Died: 24 September 2002 (aged 49) Tripoli, Libya
- Party: MDJT

Youssouf Togoïmi (26 March 1953 – 24 September 2002) was a Chadian politician who served in the government under President Idriss Déby but subsequently led a rebel group, the Movement for Democracy and Justice in Chad (MDJT), against Déby.

== Life and career ==
Youssouf Togoïmi was born in 1953 in Zouar. He came from a Bideyat Ennedi family established in the Tibesti Mountains and considered to be a Teda. Graduating as a jurist, Togoïmi was one of the few natives of the massif, other than Goukouni Oueddei, to have occupied a high position in the Chadian government. Togoïmi served as state prosecutor in Abéché and N'Djaména during the presidency of Hissène Habré and later, after the coup d'état of 1990, in a number of positions under Idriss Déby: he was Minister of Justice from 1990 to 1993, Minister of Defence from 1995 to 1997, and was then appointed Minister of the Interior on 21 May 1997. Shortly after the latter appointment, he resigned from the government on 3 June 1997. He said that his resignation came about because of what he described as the "dictatorial drift" of the government. Often referred to as very charismatic, during this period Togoïmi enjoyed an excellent reputation as an honest and ethical politician who transcended ethnic divisions. However, Togoïmi's break with Déby has also been interpreted in ethnic terms, based on his own status as a Toubou and Déby's status as a Zaghawa.

On 12 October 1998, he formed the Movement for Democracy and Justice in Chad (MDJT), a dissident rebel group that sought to overthrow the government, initially with the support of Libya. Operating initially from his power base in the Tibesti Mountains, the group waged a guerilla war against government forces. He was re-elected as party leader at a party congress in Sabha, Libya in December 2001 and on 25 December he expressed a willingness to negotiate with the government. The MDJT's second vice-president Adoum Togoi signed a peace agreement with the government in Tripoli, Libya, on 7 January 2002. The terms of the agreement involved a cease-fire, inclusion of the MDJT in the government, and the integration of MDJT's members into the army. An amnesty for MDJT members was approved by the National Assembly of Chad in late February. A month later, the agreement began to break down as the government rejected MDJT demands, including its proposal for new prime minister from the MDJT. In May, Togoi, who was viewed as a moderate in the group, was allegedly ambushed, injured and kidnapped by Togoïmi, who was viewed as a hard-liner, an apparent result of a split in the group regarding how to handle the peace negotiations, and late in the month the first fighting since the signing of the peace agreement broke out.

Togoïmi was injured by a land mine in late August in the Tibesti area and he died from his wounds in Tripoli on 24 September 2002. Mockhtar Wawa Dahab, a spokesman for the Chadian government, responded to the death by stating that it "ought to make it easier for peace to return to Chad".
