= Bahaï, Chad =

Bahaï باهأي
- Location in Chad
- Coordinates: 15°33′N 22°54′E
- Country: Chad
- Region: Ennedi (since 2008)
- Department: Ennedi Est
- Sub-Prefecture: Bahai
- Elevation: 2,590 ft (790 m)
- Time zone: +1

Bahaï (Arabic: باهأي) is the capital of the Ennedi Est department of Chad. It is located in the Ennedi Region, which was formed in 2008 from the Ennedi Est and Ennedi Ouest departments of the former Bourkou-Ennedi-Tibesti region.

Bahaï has been affected by the ongoing Darfur conflict, with the city receiving large numbers of refugees across the border from Sudan. and the town's United Nations humanitarian forces were reduced to a "minimum presence" in early December 2006 due to the danger posed to workers.
