= 2025 N'Djamena attack =

Failed attack on the Chadian presidential palace

- Part of the Boko Haram insurgency and the Insurgency in Chad (2016–present)
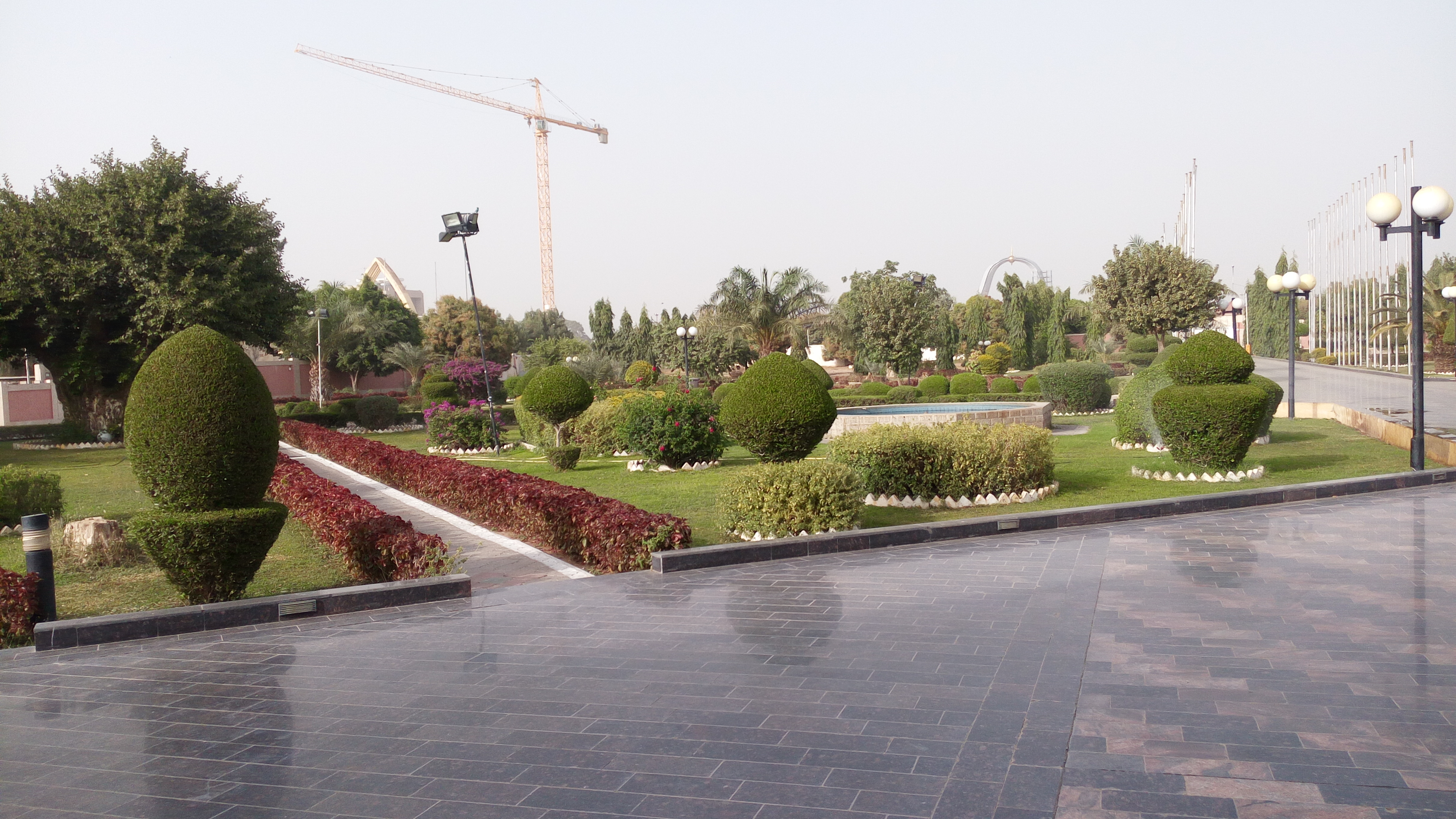
- The courtyard of the Pink Palace, the presidential palace of Chad
Date	8 January 2025; 8:45 pm (WAT)
Location	Presidential palace in N'Djamena, Chad 12°06′33″N 15°02′17″E

Belligerents
Chad National Army	Assailants (possibly Boko Haram)

Casualties and losses
2 killed 5 wounded	18 killed 6 wounded
- Location within Chad 2025 N'Djamena attack (Africa)

On 8 January 2025, an attack was carried out against the presidential palace, known as the Pink Palace, in the Chadian capital N'Djamena by unknown attackers. The 24 attackers attempted to gain entry through a security gate of the presidential palace before being confronted by security forces. Chadian President Mahamat Déby was inside the presidential palace at the time, and he later released a thanking guards for thwarting the attack. A total of 20 people were killed in the attack, of which 18 were attackers and two were presidential guards.

The attack was described by the Minister of Foreign Affairs as an "attempt at destabilization". However, he denied it was a terrorist attack, and described the attackers as disorganized bandits. An investigation by the government has been launched into the motivations of the attackers and their affiliations; however, sources report that it was carried out by Jihadist group Boko Haram. The country has faced an insurgency by Boko Haram since 2014. No group has claimed responsibility for the attack. Other analysts however, disagreed with this.

== Background ==
Since 2014, Boko Haram has been active in western Chad, launching cross-border attacks from the Nigerian border against civilian and military targets in western Chad. In 2024, attacks by the militant group in Chad intensified, culminating in a raid on a Chadian military base near the village of Ngouboua, which left 40 Chadian soldiers dead. Additionally, Chad has faced groups linked to Islamic State and Al Qaeda.

The increased violence by Boko Haram comes amid a withdrawal of French forces from the region. France, traditionally a strong ally of the Chadian government, had provided military aid to Chad for decades, offering training for the Chadian military and intervening with airstrikes against insurgents. On 29 November 2024, during a visit by French Foreign Minister Jean-Noël Barrot to N'Djamena, the Chadian government announced an end to Chad's defense agreement with France, and requested French military personnel to leave the country. By December, most French troops had left Chad, with the remaining troops due to leave by the end of January. President Déby has pushed to have closer ties to Hungary, China, Russia, and the United Arab Emirates.

== Events ==
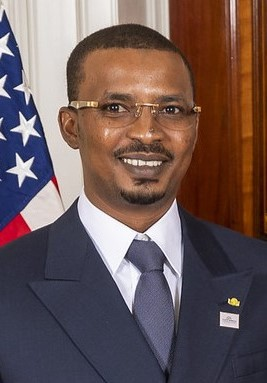
President Mahamat Déby

The attack began at around 8:45 pm. At least 24 armed men attacked the presidential palace in the Chadian capital city N'Djamena. The attack happened hours after CCP foreign chief Wang Yi visited the capital. The attackers drove up to the security gate and pretended that their vehicle had a mechanical failure before starting the attack. Reports of gunfire continued until 9:30 pm. Chadian President Mahamat Déby was inside the palace at the time of the attack and the attackers were attempting to storm the palace. Civilians fled the area in cars and on motorcycles to escape the violence. In the confusion, some civilians reportedly believed a coup d'état was taking place.

According to Chadian Foreign Minister Abderaman Koulamallah they were armed with knives and machetes. He said "They stabbed four guards, killing one and seriously injuring two others. A fourth guard was also injured, but his life is not in danger." Afterwards they attempted to gain entry into the presidential palace, where they engaged in combat with security forces. According to Koulamallah, 18 attackers were killed and six were injured, while one member of the security forces was killed and five were critically injured. He further stated that the attackers were dressed in civilian clothing during the attack and that they were killed after penetrating the camp surrounding the presidency. Videos of the bodies of dead attackers as well as men captured during the attack were circulating on social media.

Koulamallah added that the attackers were local youth from N'Djamena and were disorganized and intoxicated by alcohol and drugs. He referred to them as "Pieds Nickelés", in reference to a French comic series about criminals. He said that "We found that they had a lot of alcohol, small bottles of water filled with alcohol. It looks like whiskey or something like that. Also some drugs, they were completely drugged, at least the survivors." He ruled out that it was a terrorist attack.

In contrast, an anonymous source connected to the Chadian security services told the media that the attackers belonged to the Jihadist group Boko Haram. The sources say that the men were instead armed with firearms when they attacked the Presidential Palace.

Enrica Picco from the think tank International Crisis Group said that the attack and the response by security forces shows that "Tensions are very high at the presidential palace." Additionally, she said, "Deby knows that he has a lot of enemies who want to replace him or change the way Chad is dealing with different crises."

Ulf Laessing from the Konrad Adenauer Foundation however, disagreed it could be Boko Haram related. "The jihadists are mainly active in the Lake Chad region and do not carry out attacks as complex as the one on the presidential palace," he said. "The attackers knew where to go and they were expected at the same time. I rather suspect that it is an intrigue within the presidential family or the clans in the palace."

== Aftermath ==
In response to the attack, the Chad National Army blocked all roads leading to the presidential palace, and armed personnel were deployed on the streets. Armored vehicles could be seen in the capital driving towards the palace. As of 9 January, six people have been arrested in connection with the attack, though no specific information was further released. No group has claimed responsibility for the attack as of 9 January.

Chadian President Mahamat Déby released a statement on his official Facebook page saying he believed he was the main target of the attack and thanked the Presidential Guard for their defense of the presidential compound. In his message he said: "The attackers of this vain attempt aimed to crush me but they were crushed by the bravery, vigilance and courage of the Presidential Guard." He said that the identities and motivations of the attackers were not known, and a full investigation should determine their identities.

Infrastructure Minister Aziz Mahamat Saleh posted on his Facebook page, "Nothing serious, no panic; the situation is under control." Abderaman Koulamallah said in a video posted on Facebook "It was a little incident ... everything is calm. ... This whole attempt at destabilization has been wiped out." The government has launched an investigation as to the perpetrators of the attack and their motivation. The public prosecutor at the N'Djamena Court Oumar Mahamat Kedelaye also condemned the attack and confirmed a criminal investigation is underway to determine any co-conspirators and instigators behind the attack.

The Chinese foreign ministry said it firmly supports Chad's efforts to ensure its safety and stability.
