= Vergnet =

French wind turbine manufacturer

- Native name: Vergnet
- Industry: Manufacture of engines and turbines, except airplane and vehicle motors
- Founded: 1989
- Founder: Marc Vergnet
- Headquarters: Ormes, France
- Number of employees: 166
- Website: www.vergnet.com

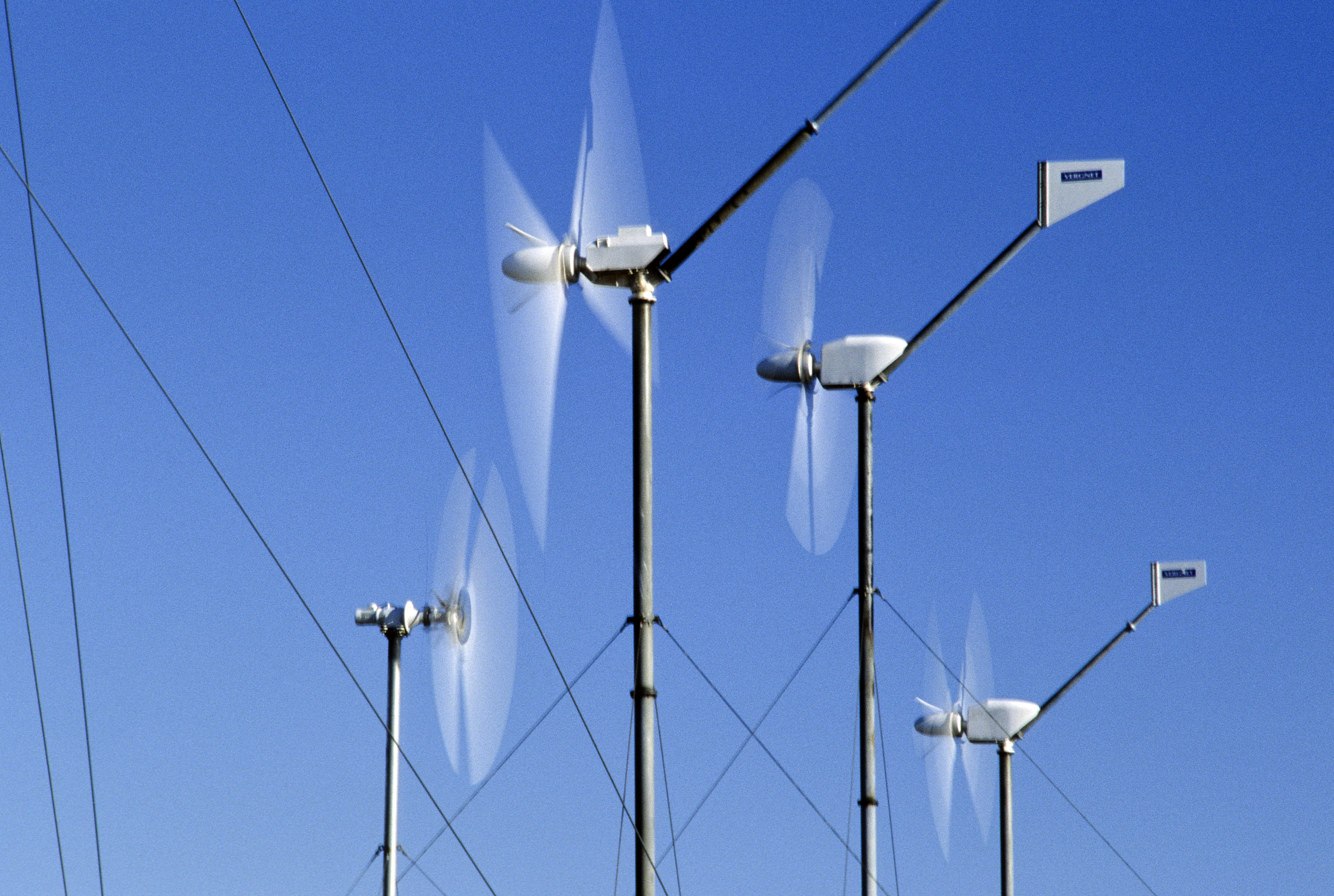
Vergnet wind turbine farm, model of the same type or similar to the wind farm that was commissioned in Guadalupe.

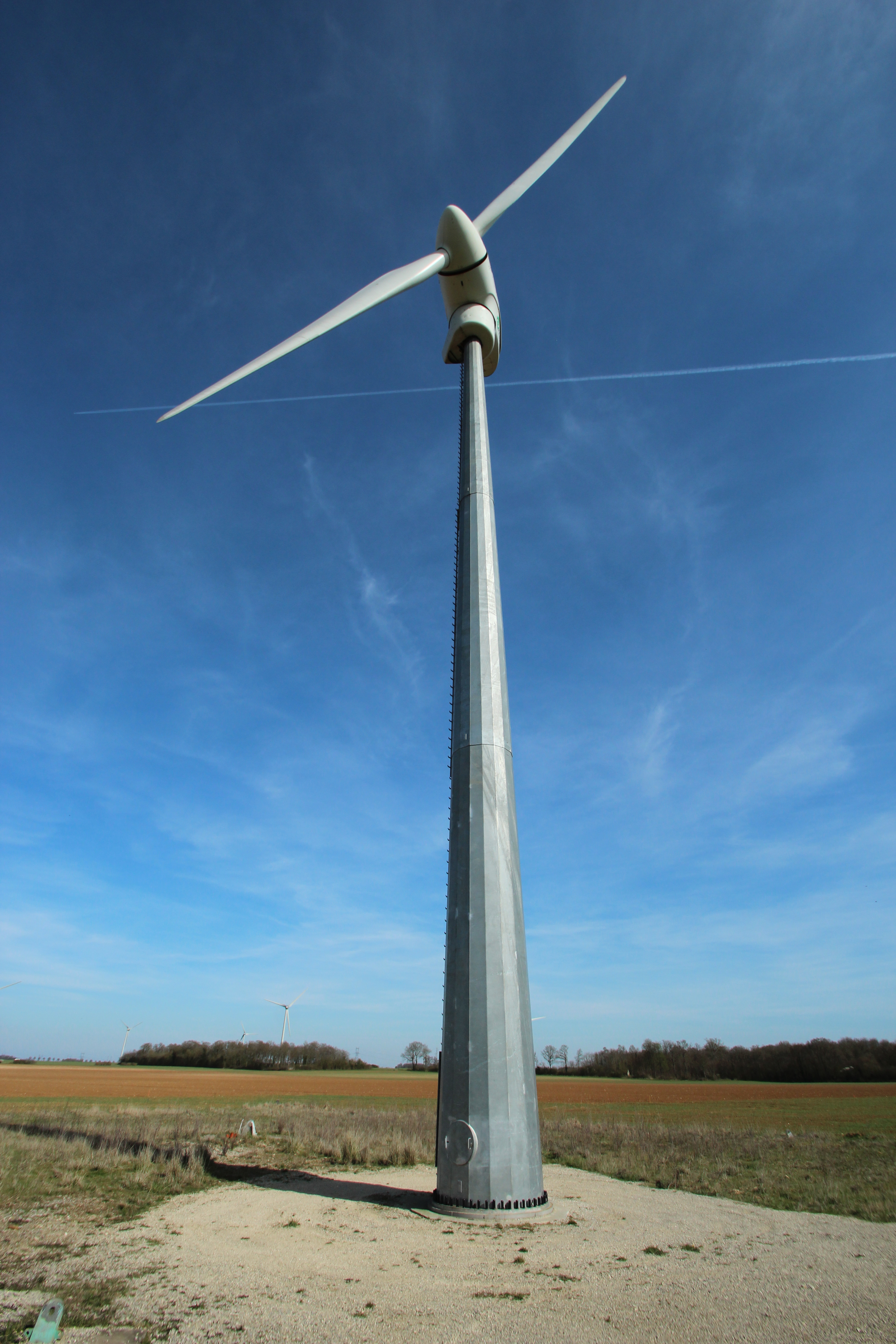
GEV MP R 275kW found in Gommerville, France. (Notice the self standing tower)

Vergnet is a French wind turbine manufacturer headquartered in Orléans. The company also produces water pumps installed in Africa. The company has operated since 1989, with projects operated in about 60 countries worldwide. The company has two production sites that are in France: Ormes, which makes the nacelles used for the turbines, and Servian, which makes the blades, a part which is critical for use of the turbine.

Vergnet specializes in two-bladed wind turbines, and have models ranging from 5KW in power to 1MW. Along with this, they have wind turbines with rotor diameters ranging from 5m to 62m. Even with this, a large majority of Vergnet models are rated between 200KW and 300KW. Guyed towers are mostly used for the towers of Vergnet turbines since they are quite cost effective contrary to self standing towers. Even with this, some self standing towers are still used.

Vergnet wind turbines are small to midsize and are designed for operation in tropical countries: Caribbean, Africa, parts of Asia and South America. They are robust, designed to resist hurricanes (by parking the turbine close to the ground), and easy to assemble on site with self erecting components (no tall crane required) from factory-made kits.

== History ==
In 1993, four years after Vergnet started operations, it commissioned its first power plants in La Désirade, Guadeloupe.

In 2008, Vergnet got a large contract for 120 1MW turbines in Ethiopia.

In 2016, Amdjarass Wind Farm was installed as the first wind farm in Chad.

In December 2017, Bpifrance sold its shares to a group led by Patrick Werner, former head of La Banque Postale.

In February 2020, a consortium including Vergnet won the contract for the Agadez hybrid power plant.

In June 2024, Vergnet entered the Dominican Republic by signing the Guazuma wind project.
