= Hassan Abdallah Mardigue =

Chadian rebel

Hassan Abdallah Mardigue is the disputed leader of the Chadian rebel group Movement for Democracy and Justice in Chad (MDJT). He was born c. 1951 in Gouro in the north of Chad.
