= Bardaï, Chad =

Bardaï برداي
- Town
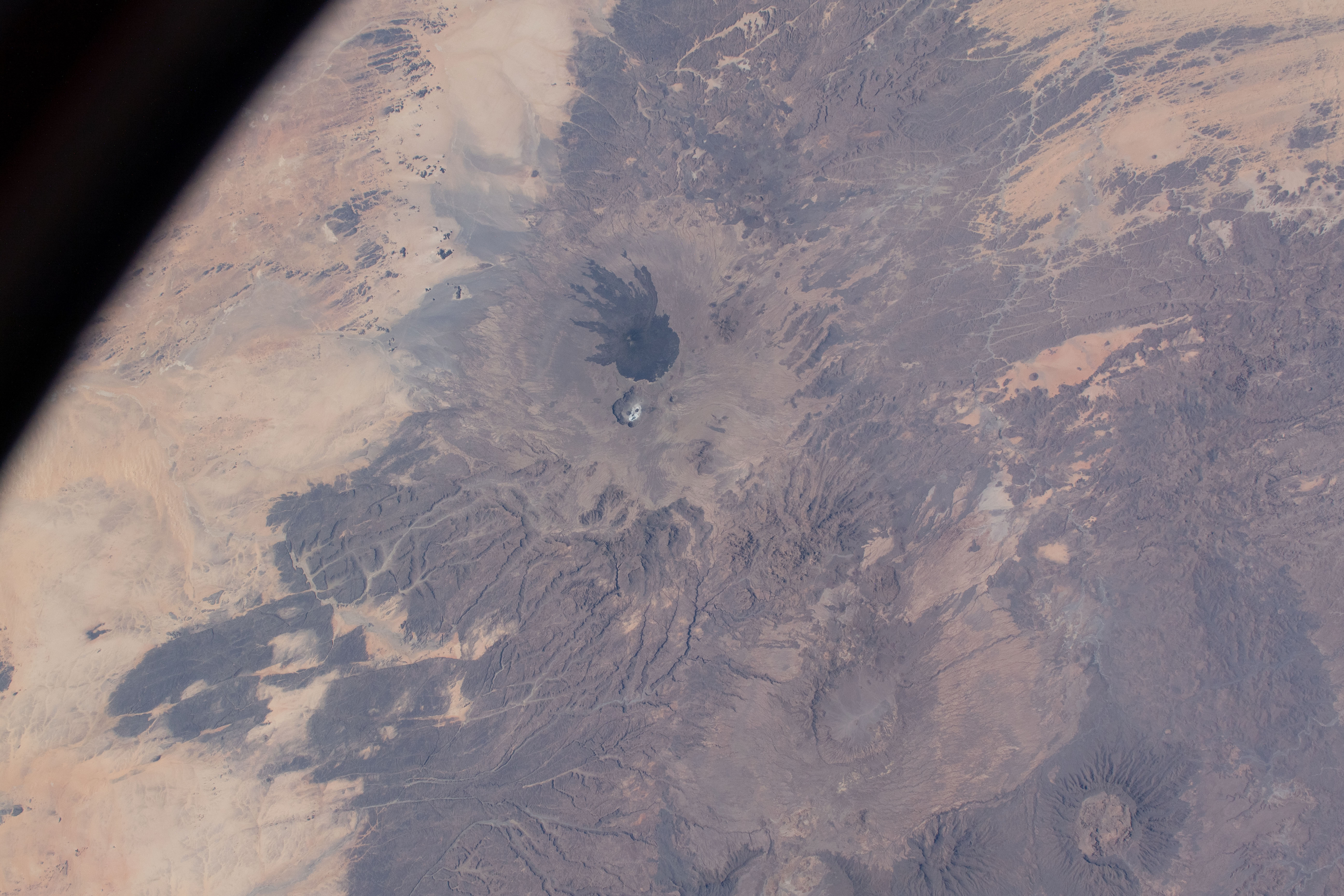
- Landscape around of Bardaï, volcano Toussidé, ISS photo

- Location in Chad
- Coordinates: 21°21′12″N 17°0′1″E
- Country: Chad
- Region: Tibesti
- Department: Tibesti
- Sub-prefecture: Bardai
- Elevation: 1,017 m (3,338 ft)
- Time zone: UTC+01:00 (WAT)

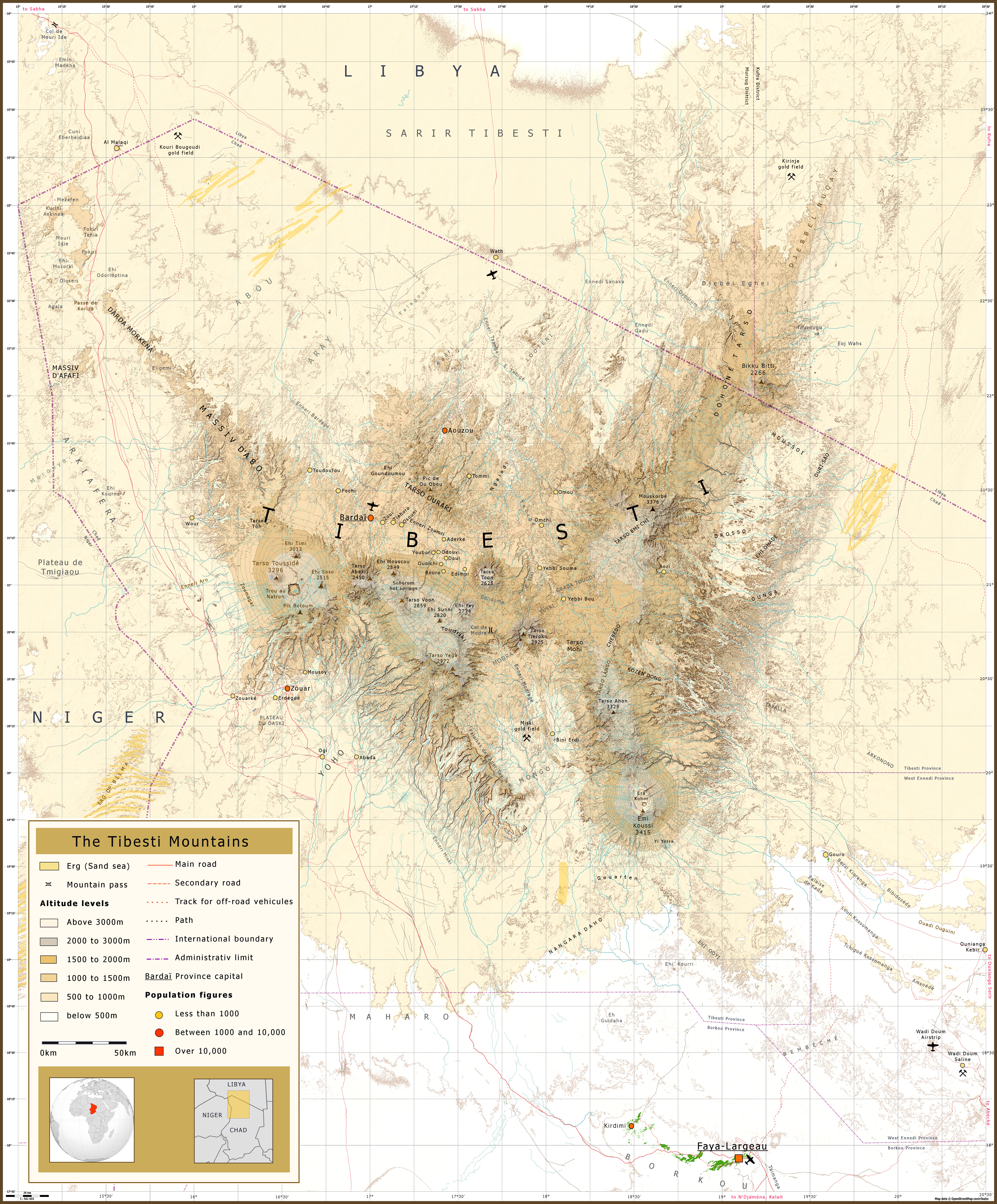
Topographic map of the Tibesti mountains. Bardaï is located on the map between the I and the B of the name TIBESTI.

Bardaï (Arabic: برداي) is a small town and oasis in the extreme north of Chad. It is the main town of the Tibesti Region, which was formed in 2008 from the Tibesti Department of the former Bourkou-Ennedi-Tibesti region. It lies in the heart of the Sahara desert, surrounded by palm groves, rock formations and canyons, approximately 111 kilometres (69 mi) northeast of Zouar.

== History ==
The first European who reported Bardaï was the German explorer Gustav Nachtigal. He reached Bardaï on 8 August 1869, but had to flee on 3–4 September because of the hostile attitude of the local Toubou population. The town was invaded by the Turks in around 1908, and by 1911 they had 60 men and six cannons in Bardaï.

In early September 1965 a Chadian soldier was killed in Bardaï in a fight following a dance. The local subprefect reacted harshly, placing sanctions upon the local residents. In September 1968, under the presidency of François Tombalbaye, revolts broke out, driven by tribal disputes—primarily involving the Toubou people, who refused to submit to the authority of the Chadian state. France deployed detachments to Bardaï and Faya-Largeau, which marked the beginning of a series of rebellions that persist to this day.

Bardaï came to international attention in 1974, when a rebel group, led by Hissène Habré, attacked the town and captured a French archaeologist, Françoise Claustre, and two other European citizens. The rebels established an anti-French radio station here during the civil war, which was known as the "Voice of Liberation of Chad", or Radio Bardaï. An opposition government led by Goukouni Oueddei was established here with Libyan military backing in the early 1980s. In December 1986, Habré forces attacked the Libyans at Bardaï.

== Geography ==
The commune of Bardaï is located in the north of Chad in the Tibesti Region, approximately 111 kilometres (69 mi) northeast of Zouar and 1,046 kilometres (650 mi) by air northeast of the Chadian capital of N'Djamena. It is a small town and oasis, nestled in the heart of the Sahara, surrounded by palm groves, rock formations and canyons. Outside of Bardaï is the Enneri Zumri valley, which contains traditional Teda villages, sandstone gorges and green oases. It is the capital of the Tibesti Region, Tibesti Department and the Bardaï sub-prefecture.

== Demographics ==
The Tedaga language is spoken within the Bardaï area of northern Chad, although the Dazaga language is a secondary language.

== Landmarks and facilities ==
Bardaï Central Mosque is the main mosque in the town. The town is served by Zougra Airport, an airstrip which is about 10 kilometres (6.2 mi) north of the town. The local football team is General Sal Football club. Bardaï Hospital, run by the government, was built in 2011, and was the only hospital in the region as of 2026.
