= Zouar, Chad =

Zouar زوار
- Town
- Location in Chad
- Coordinates: 20°27′27″N 16°31′28″E
- Country: Chad
- Region: Tibesti
- Department: Tibesti Ouest
- Sub-Prefecture: Zouar
- Elevation: 2,507 ft (764 m)
- Time zone: UTC+01:00 (WAT)

Zouar (Arabic: زوار) is a town in the Tibesti Ouest department of the Tibesti region in northern Chad, located in an oasis in the Tibesti Mountains, approximately 111 kilometres (69 mi) southwest of Bardaï and 939 kilometres (583 mi) northeast of the Chadian capital of N'Djamena by air. Prior to 2008 it was in the Tibesti Department of the former Bourkou-Ennedi-Tibesti region.

== History ==
The seat of the derde, the highest religious and political authority among the Teda of the Tibesti, the town came under French control in 1917.

After Chad's independence, Zouar played an important role during the Chadian Civil War and the Chadian-Libyan conflict, when its control was hotly contended. It was first besieged in 1968 by the FROLINAT rebels led by Mahamat Ali Taher, and was relieved only by the arrival in August of a French expeditionary force. One of the last strongholds held by the government in the north, it was attacked in June 1977 by the People's Armed Forces (FAP), forcing the garrison to evacuate.

During the Chadian-Libyan conflict, a Libyan garrison was installed, only to be expelled when the former pro-Libyan FAP rebelled in the Tibesti in August 1986; but the town was reconquered with the Libyan counter-offensive in December. In January 1987 the Chadian army once and for all freed Zouar.

In October 1998, with the foundation of the insurgent Movement for Democracy and Justice in Chad (MDJT), civil war has erupted again in the north. The MDJT commander, Youssouf Togoimi, announced in June 1999 that his forces were in a position to take Zouar and Bardaï, but preferred to wait for the government troops to surrender. On 18 March 2006 the MDJT started besieging the town.

== Landmarks ==
The town is served by Zouar Airport and the colleges of Centre d'étude archéologique and Petite école à Zouar et à Zouarké.

== Notable people ==
Zouar is also the birthplace of the former Head of State Goukouni Oueddei and of the MDJT founder Youssouf Togoimi, respectively born in 1944 and 1953.
