= Wour, Chad =

Wour ور
- Town
- Location in Chad
- Coordinates: 21.361267°N 15.976248°E
- Country: Chad
- Region: Tibesti
- Sub-prefecture: Wour
- Elevation: 770 m (2,530 ft)

Map of the Tibesti and surrounding area with Wour in the very West (in French)

Wour (Arabic: ور) is a small town and oasis in the extreme north of Chad. It is the main town of the Wour sub-prefecture, which was formed in 2008 as one out of three in the Tibesti Region. Despite its small size of only a few hundred inhabitants (the whole sub-prefecture counting 1,498 people in 2009), Wour is a strategically-important location in northern Chad. Wour has been fiercely fought over several times in recent history, especially in December 1986 during the Tibesti War and in early 1987 during the "Toyota War".
