= Idriss Déby's government =

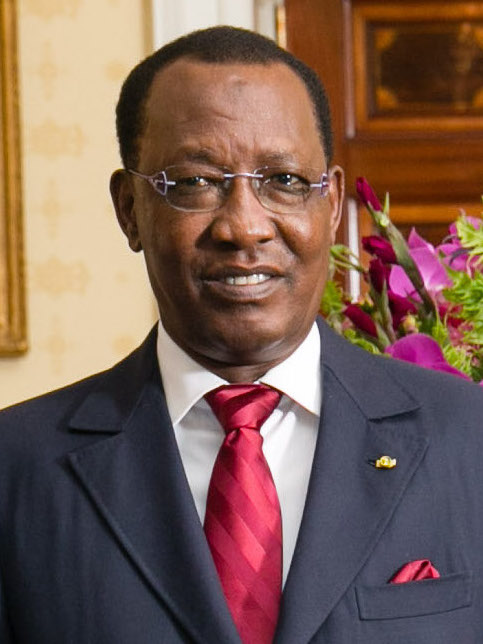
Idriss Déby at the white house in 2014

Idriss Déby's government governed Chad from 1990 to 2021. It ended with the death of the president in 2021.

== Beginnings ==
Following the 1990 Chadian coup d'état, Déby became the head of the Chadian provisional government. On February 28, 1991, the Patriotic Salvation Movement (MPS) approved a national charter that promised the return of a multi-party system and appointed Déby president. Continued clashes with rebel groups preceded a 1993 national charter that reaffirmed Déby's presidency while a new constitution was written. This constitution went into effect on April 14, 1996.

== Evolution ==
Déby's victory in the 2001 election was met with allegations of fraud by his opponents; they were briefly arrested for their protest. In 2004, Déby and the MPS pushed for a constitutional amendment that eliminates presidential term limits. This effort proved successful as a 2005 constitutional referendum approved the change despite public backlash from political and human rights organizations. Scrutiny of Déby continued as he was re-elected in 2006, 2011, and 2016.

In May 2018, Chad adopted a new Constitution that strengthened presidential powers, eliminated the role of Prime Minister, extended presidential terms from five years to six years, and placed a presidential term limit of two terms.

The government was reshuffled for the first time on 18 June 2018 and a second time on 9 November 2018.

== Criticism ==
Déby's was frequently criticized by both Chadians and international reporters for engaging in "authoritarian" practices, such as internet shutdowns and the repression of protestors.

== Collapse ==
In April 2021, Déby was re-elected despite allegations from his opponents that they were forced to withdraw following attacks and intimidation from Déby's security forces. The government collapsed when Déby was killed by rebels from the Front for Change and Concord in Chad (FACT) the day after his victory was announced.
