= Ennedi Est (province) =

Region of Chad

Ennedi Est إنيدي الشرقية Inīdī ash-Sharqī
- Province
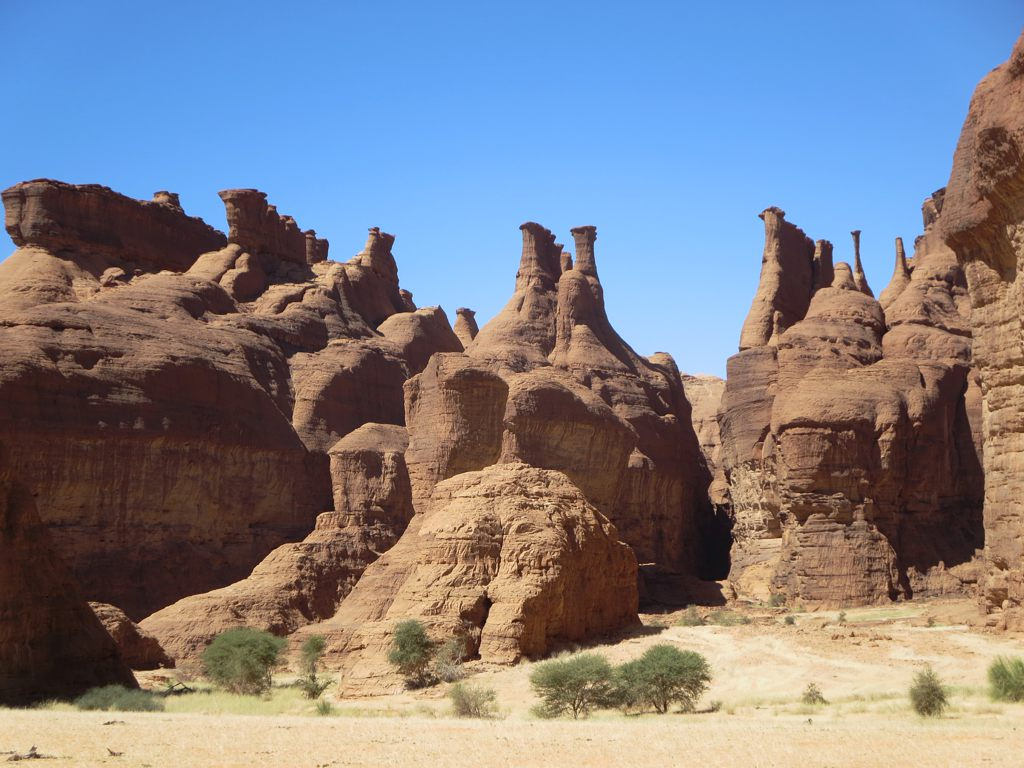
- Hoodoos in the Ennedi Plateau

- Map of Chad highlighting the Ennedi-Est region in red.
- Coordinates: 17°39′N 23°9′E
- Country: Chad
- Created: 4 September 2012
- Regional capital: Amdjarass

Government
  - Delegate general: Mahamat Togou Tchohimi

Population (2009 census)
  - Total: 107,302
  - Estimate (2018 projection): 147,956
- Time zone: UTC+01:00 (WAT)

Ennedi Est (Arabic: إنيدي الشرقي, romanised: Inīdī ash-Sharqī) is one of the twenty-three provinces of Chad. The capital of the province is Amdjarass.

== History ==
Ennedi Est was established on September 4, 2012 from part of the former Ennedi Region. It appears to cover the same territory as the former Ennedi Est Department.

From 1960 to 1999, the province was part of the Borkou-Ennedi-Tibesti Prefecture, and until 2008 was the Ennedi Est Department in the region of the same name. From 2008 to 2012, the province was part of the Ennedi Region as the Wadi Hawar department until the Ennedi Region was divided.

== Geography ==
The province is situated in the far northeast of Chad. It borders Kufra District in Libya to the north, North Darfur in Sudan to the east, Wadi Fira Region to the south, and Ennedi-Ouest Region to the west. The region is geographically part of the Sahara Desert, and contains features such as the Erdi Plateau and the Mourdi Depression in the north, and the eastern portion of the Ennedi Plateau in the center. The Ennedi Plateau is protected as a UNESCO World Heritage Site, and the portion in Ennedi Est contains attractions such as Julia Arch and the guelta of Bachikélé, noted for its population of Rauvolfia afra, a tree that normally grows in the African tropics.

The province's northern section lies within the Aouzou Strip, historically a point of dispute between Chad and Libya.

=== Climate ===
Ennedi Est has a hot semi-arid climate (BWh) according to the Köppen climate classification. The province experiences a wide range of temperatures throughout the year, ranging from cooler temperatures in January and February that can drop to 6 °C (43 °F) and rising to peak temperatures in May that can reach over 41 °C (106 °F). Temperatures in the summer are warm but generally stable (around 31 °C or 88 °F) and start to cool in the winter, staying around 10 °C (51 °F).

=== Settlements ===
Amdjarass is the provincial capital. It recorded a population of 20,850 in the 2009 census.

== Demographics ==
The main ethnolinguistic groups are the Zaghawa and the Dazaga.

== Government and subdivisions ==
=== Subdivisions ===
Ennedi Est is divided into two departments:

Department	Capital	Communes
Am-Djarass	Am-Djarass	Am-Djarass, Bao, Djouna, Kaoura
Wadi Hawar	Wadi-Hawar	Bahaï, Birdouani

=== Leaders ===
Until 2025, the leaders of the provinces of Chad were known as governors. In 2025, the holder of the office was renamed as the delegate general of the government.

- September 2012 – 2014; ? – 2017: Hassan Djorobo Beïra
- 2018 – 2019?: Mahamat Zène Elhadj Yaya
- June 2019 – July 2019: Moukhtar Ngarbaye Tombalbaye
- July 2019 – May 2020: Ahmat Kardayo Hissein
- May 2020 – March 2021: Ngarboudjim Medeur Jacob
- March 2021 – October 2021: Mbaiomdenande Dionadji Alain
- October 2021 – January 2023: Issakha Malloua Djamous
- January 2023 – April 2023: Mahamat Abdelkerim Ali
- April 2023 – September 2023: Tom Djeroua
- September 2023 – February 2025: Ahmat Kardayo Hissein
- February 2025 – present: Mahamat Togou Tchohimi

== Infrastructure ==
Amdjarass Airport was opened on 28 December 2022. It is located 14 kilometres (8.7 mi) southwest of Amdjarass and has a 3,050-metre-long (10,010 ft) runway, the longest in Chad. The United Nations has accused the United Arab Emirates of using the airport to send weapons to the Rapid Support Forces fighting in Sudan. The UAE has denied this, claiming it has been sending humanitarian aid rather than arms.

The Ouré Cassoni refugee camp is located near Kariari Dam, which has a storage capacity of 12 million cubic metres (9,700 acre⋅ft). Here, the United Arab Emirates is building a water treatment plant to supply drinking water to Amdjarass and the surrounding areas.
