= Trou au Natron =

Volcanic caldera in Chad's Tibesti Massif

Coordinates: 20°58′30″N 16°34′03″E

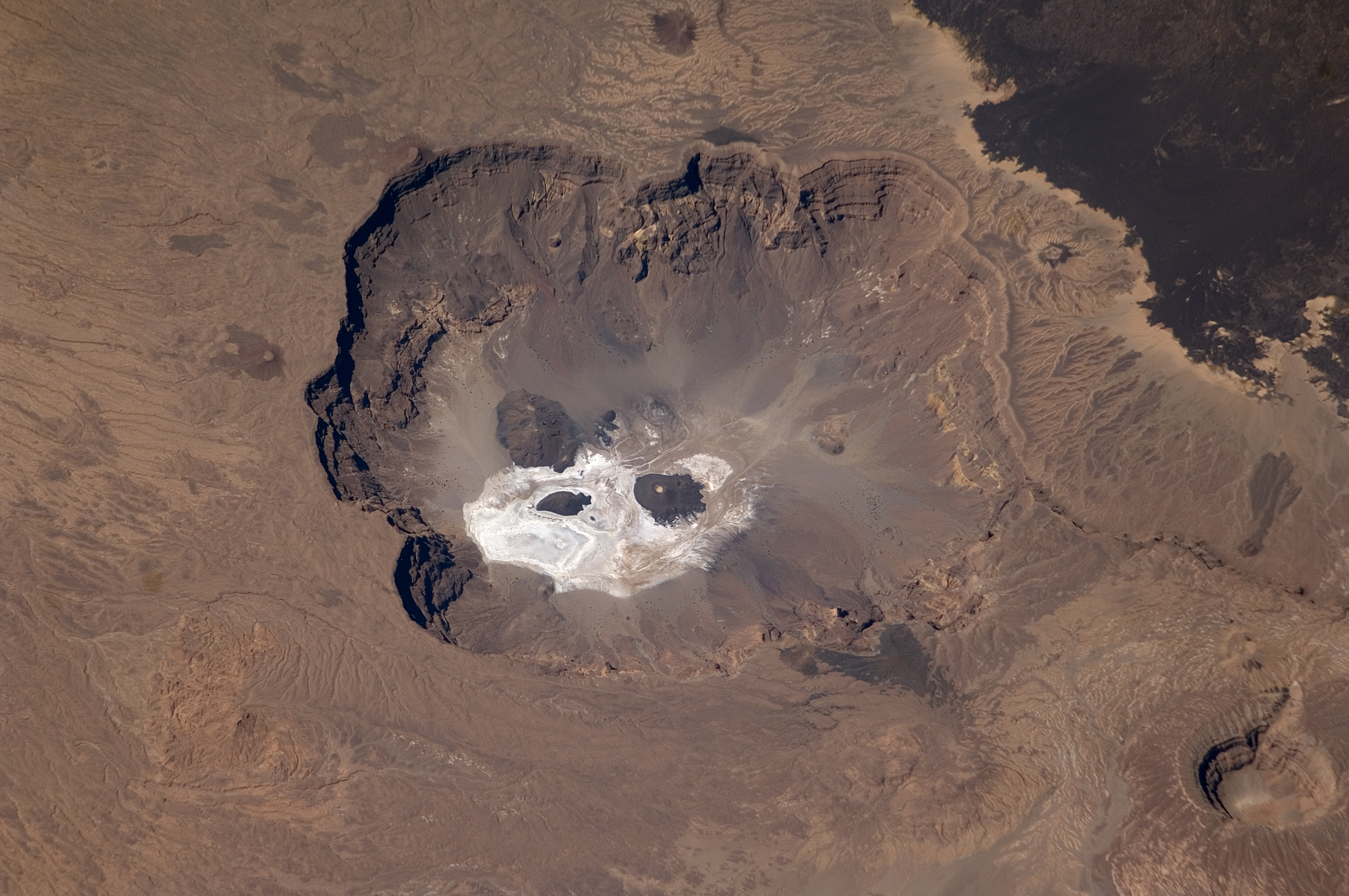
The soda lake is visible as the white area to the bottom of the crater in this satellite image of the Trou au Natron caldera in Chad.

Trou au Natron (French: "hole of natron") or Doon Orei (Teda: "big hole") is a volcanic caldera of the Tibesti Massif in the nation of Chad in Northern Africa. The volcano is extinct. It is unknown when it last erupted. Its volcano number is 0205–01. Trou au Natron is located just south-east of Toussidé, the westernmost volcano of the Tibesti Mountains. Its edge cuts into the nearby Yirrigue caldera.

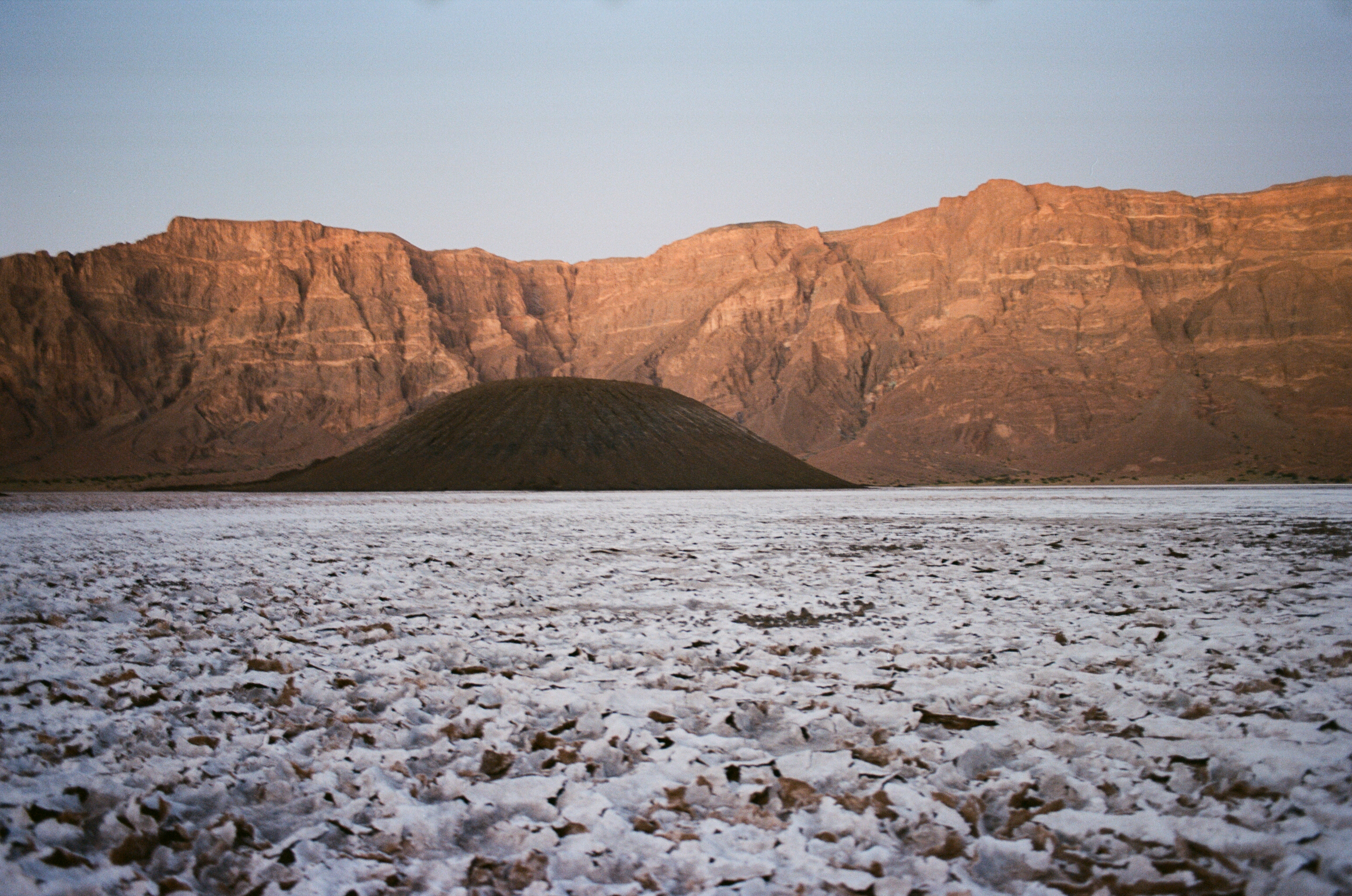
Natron deposits, Trou au Natron, Tibesti, Chad

== Geology ==
The caldera sits at an elevation of 2,450 m (8,040 ft). It has an irregular diameter of approximately 6–8 km (4–5 mi) and is up to 1,000 m (3,300 ft) deep. Four smaller volcanic cones, made of scoria or andesitic tuff sit on the floor of the caldera. Numerous smaller vents and hot springs on the caldera's floor emit hot steam and mineral water.

Because of its irregular shape, it has been theorized that the caldera was formed as a result of multiple massive explosions, each of which deepened the enormous pit. During these explosions, chunks of debris up to 5 m^{3} (180 cu ft) in size may have been hurled up to 10 km (6.2 mi) from the crater. Its exact period of formation is unconfirmed, although a Pleistocene formation has been suggested. It is known to be one of the youngest formations on the Tibesti Massif.

Much of the surface of the caldera is lined with a white crust of carbonate salts such as sodium carbonite and natrolite. This substance is also known as natron, leading to the French name for the site. This crust is sometimes known as the Tibesti Soda Lake. The crusts are formed when mineral-rich steam is emitted from small vents on the crater's floor. When this water evaporates in the desert heat, the minerals remain behind as part of the crust.

Both the slopes and the floor of the caldera contain thick layers of fossilized aquatic gastropods and diatoms, indicating that the caldera was once home to a deep lake. During the Last Glacial Maximum, the lake may have been up to 500 m (1,600 ft) deep. Radiocarbon dating on some of these samples indicates an age of approximately 14,500–15,000 years Before Present.

== Gallery ==
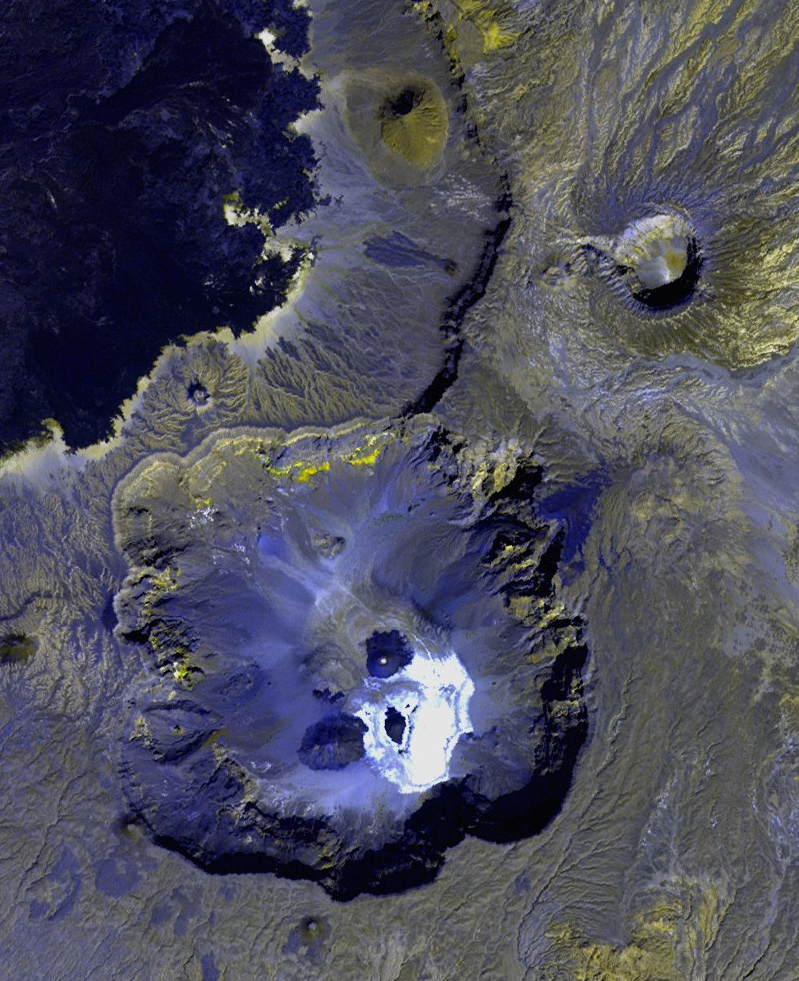
Satellite image of Trou au Natron via Advanced Spaceborne Thermal Emission and Reflection Radiometer (ASTER)

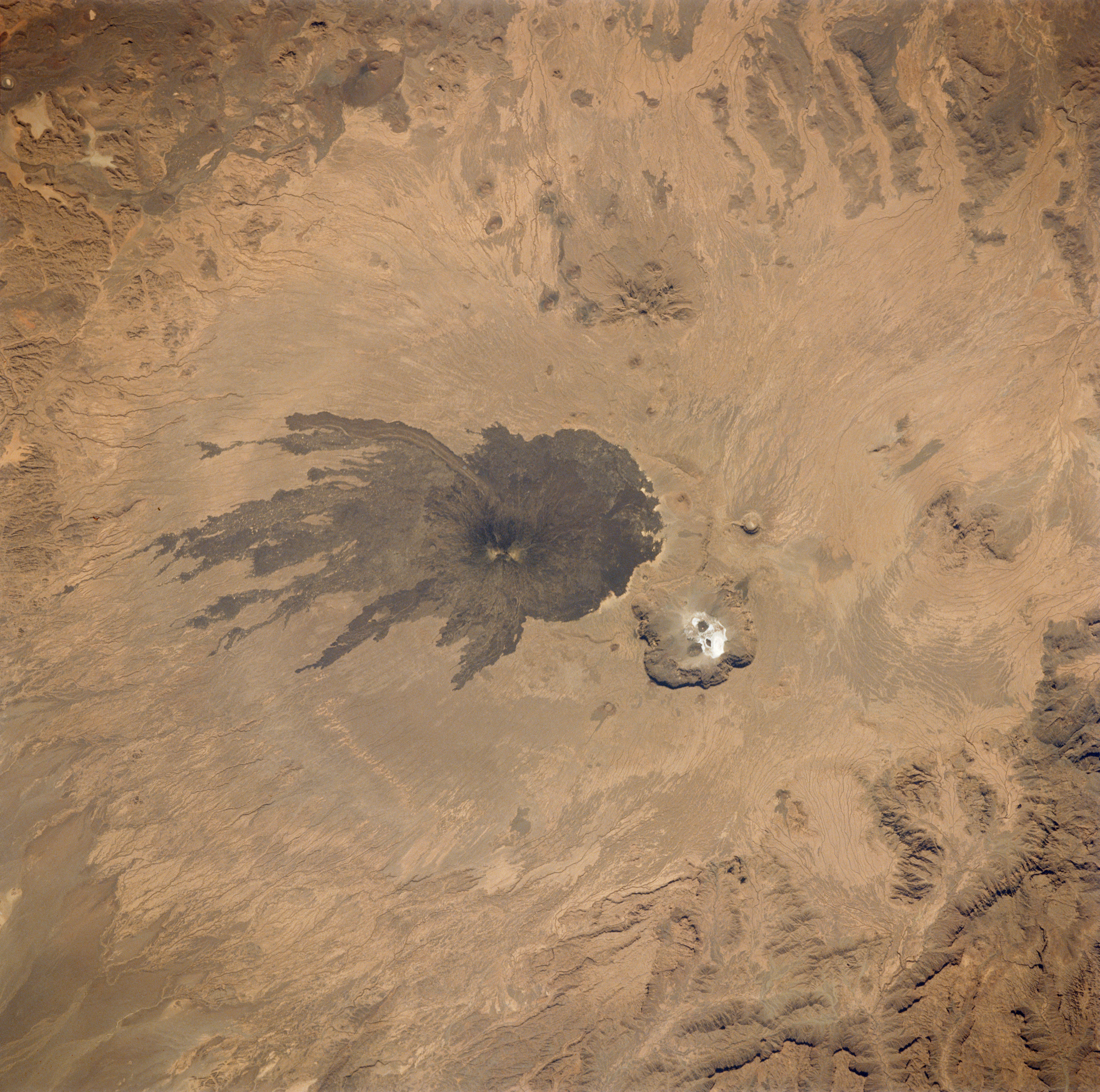
Satellite image of the Tousside volcano (large dark area in centre). Trou au Natron is visible below and to the right (smaller white area).

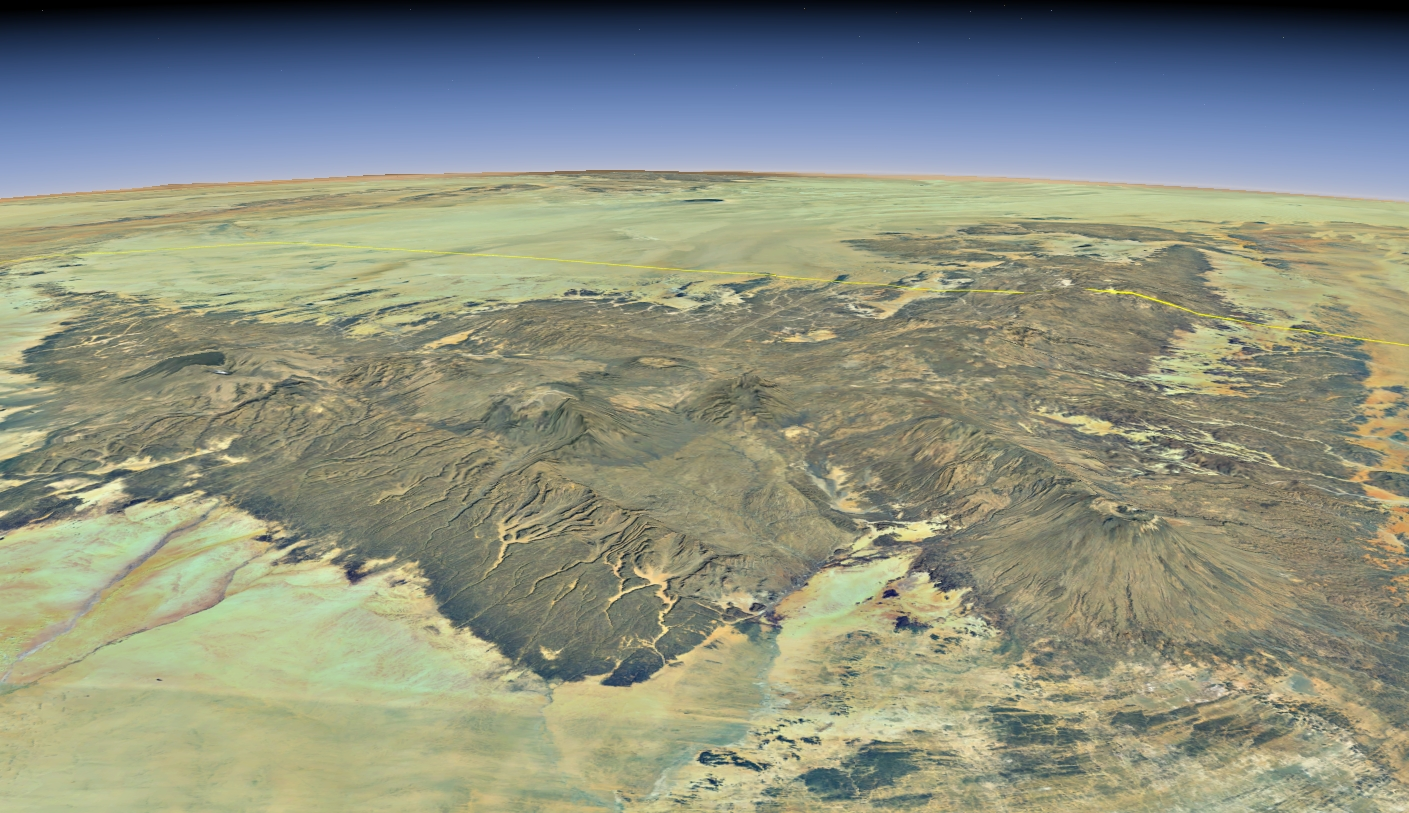
Satellite overview of the Tibesti Massif. Trou au Natron is located to the left; it is highlighted in the full-size view of the image.

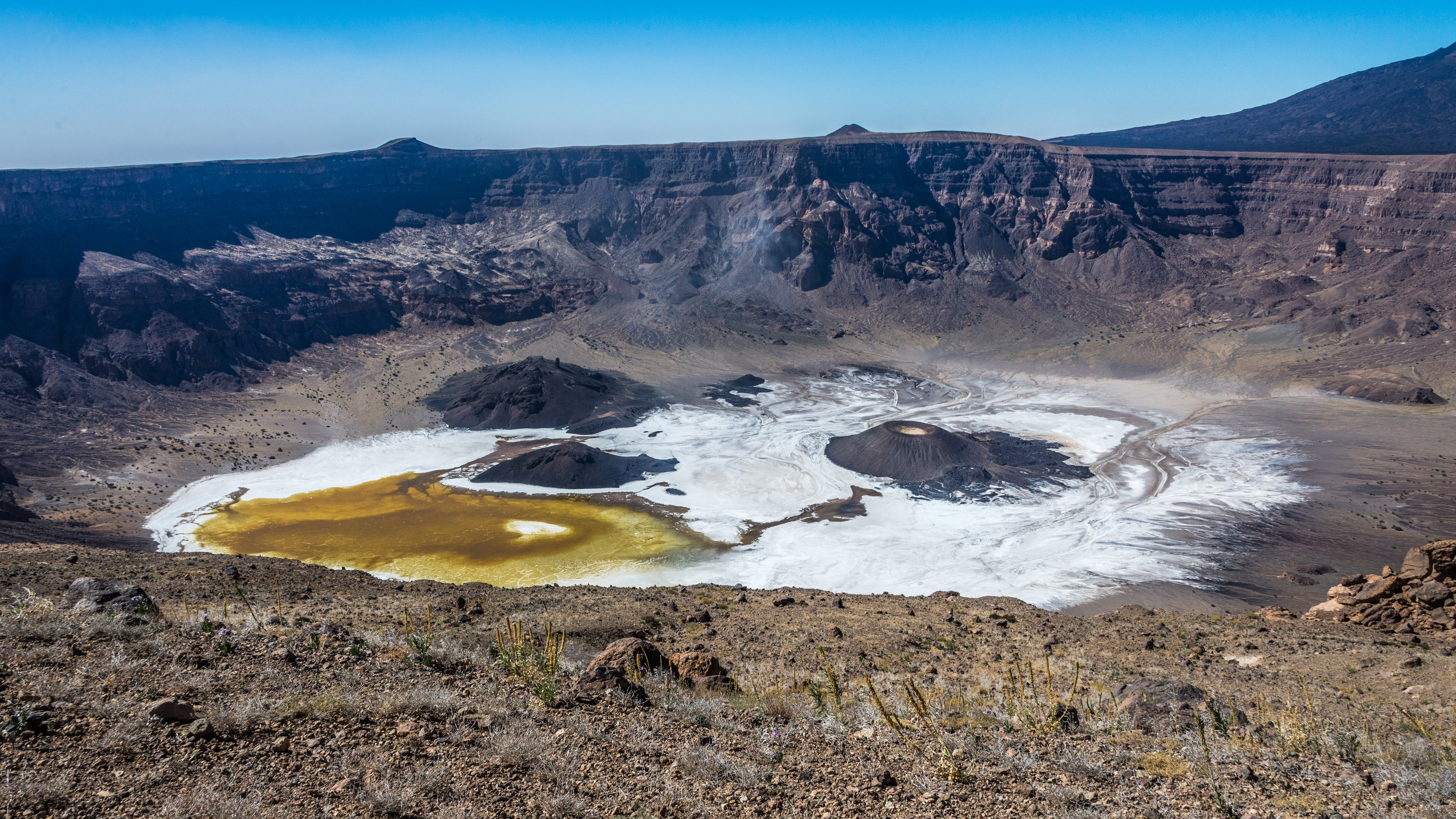
Overview of Trou au Natron's caldera from its summit
