= Tarso Toon =

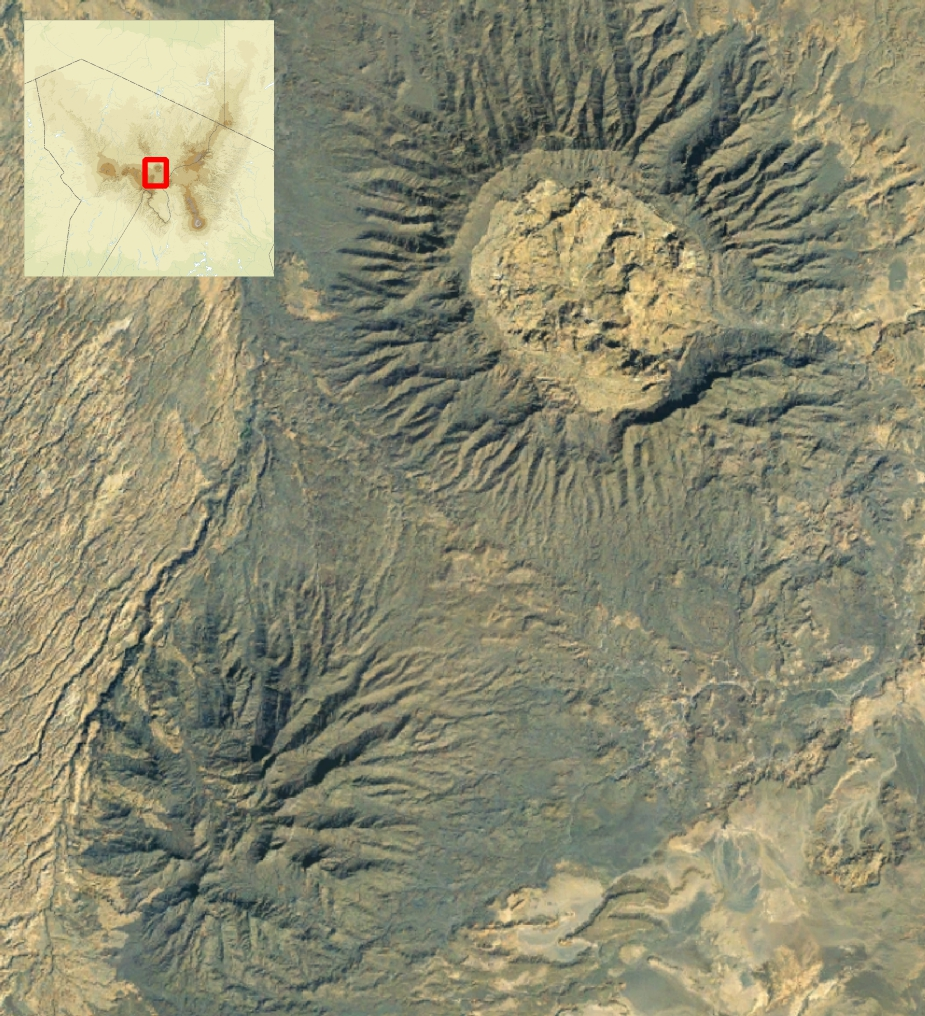
- Tarso Toon is in the upper right corner

Highest point
- Coordinates: 21.07°N 17.62°E

Geography
- Location within Chad

Tarso Toon (sometimes also known as Tarso Toh; "Tarso" means "high plateau".) is a volcano in the central Tibesti mountains.

The volcano reaches a maximum height of 2,575 metres (8,448 ft) and a width of 21 by 19 kilometres (13 mi × 12 mi), covering a surface of 600 square kilometres (230 sq mi). It also features a caldera 11 by 12 kilometres (6.8 mi × 7.5 mi) wide, with a gap on its northern side.

It was active in the Miocene, developing over older ignimbrites with tholeiitic rocks. Later, felsic volcanic rocks were emplaced within the caldera and the Voon ignimbrite buried parts of the tholeiite.

== See also ==
- Tarso Toh, a distinct volcano in Tibesti
