= Movement for Democracy and Justice in Chad =

- Mouvement pour la démocratie et la justice au Tchad
- Founder: Youssouf Togoïmi †
- Leaders: Youssouf Togoïmi †; Adam Togoï; Hassan Abdallah Mardigue; Aboubakar Choua Dazi
- Dates active: 12 October 1998–present
- Country: Chad
- Ideology: Anti-Déby; Toubou interests

Movement for Democracy and Justice in Chad (French: Mouvement pour la democratie et la justice au Tchad, abbreviated as MDJT) is a Chadian rebel group. It initially tried to oust the government of the former Chadian president Idriss Déby from October 1998–2003. The movement was founded by Youssouf Togoïmi, Déby's former Defense Minister, and operated primarily in Bourkou-Ennedi-Tibesti and the Tibesti Mountains.

Though MDJT fought mostly against the Chadian Military, they were accused of assassinating the President of an opposition party in 1999, but no evidence supports this claim.

MDJT began negotiating with the Chadian government in January 2002 and signed a treaty giving amnesty to all MDJT rebels who stopped fighting. A MDJT remnant continued to fight to on a smaller scale until another agreement was signed in December 2003. This accord ensured high-ranking government positions for MDJT members. Togoïmi died in September 2002 in a Libyan hospital from injuries he had received a few days earlier when his truck hit a landmine. Togoïmi is buried in Libya.

The movement was similar in where it got its members, the Chadian military, and goals, overthrow of President Déby, to the later Platform for Change, Unity and Democracy.

Amid the ongoing insurgency in Chad, it and other rebel groups conducted peace talks with the Chadian government in March 2022.

== See also ==
- Civil war in Chad (1998–2002)
- Revolutionary Armed Forces of the Sahara
