= Amdjarass (department) =

Department of Ennedi-Est, Chad

Am-Djarass
- Department
- Interactive map of Am-Djarass
- Country: Chad
- Region: Ennedi-Est

Amdjarass (French: Amdjarass, Arabic: أم جرس) is a department within the Ennedi Est province of the Republic of Chad.

Its capital is the city of Amdjarass.
