= Tibesti Department =

Coordinates: 21°21′N 17°00′E

Tibesti (Arabic: تبستي) was one of four departments within the former Bourkou-Ennedi-Tibesti region of Chad. Its capital was Bardaï.

In 2008 the Bourkou-Ennedi-Tibesti Region was split into three, with Tibesti Department becoming the separate Tibesti Region.

The area takes its name from the Tibesti Mountains.

From March to December 2006, demining work was carried out in this area of Chad along with the Borkou Department.
