= Amdjarass (city) =

- Location in Chad
- Coordinates: 16°3′57″N 22°50′35″E
- Country: Chad
- Province: Ennedi Est (province) (Note: On 10 August 2018, a new ordinance divided the country into 23 provinces, 107 departments, and 377 communes. The names of the former regions remained the same but were now called provinces.)
- Department: Amdjarass
- Sub-Prefecture: Am-Djarass
- Elevation: 896 m (2,940 ft)

Population (2009 Census)
  - Total: 20,850

Topographic Map of the Ennedi Plateau. Amdjarass is located at the bottom edge of the map.

Amdjarass or Am-Djarass (Arabic: أم جرس, romanized: Ạảm̊ Jarasuⁿ, lit. 'A mother bell') is the capital city of the province of Ennedi Est in northern Chad. It is also the capital of the second level administrative division, the Amdjarass department. It is the most populous city in the region and the fourth most populous in Saharan (Northern) Chad.

The city is presently mapped in OpenStreetMap, but many atlases do not include this city on the map. Despite formerly being an isolated Saharan oasis, its population as of the 2009 census is 20,850, and has grown considerably from just 657 residents in the 1993 census. Since 1990, it has been the hometown of Chad's ruling Déby family. On July 3, 2015, Chadian president Idriss Deby visited Amdjarass. It is the city where he would be buried six years later.

The town has a hotel called the Toumai Hotel and a fortress. There is a boomerang-shaped rock with the town's name at the entrance to the town. As of May 2021, the mayor is Aboud Hachim Bouder.

Declan Walsh of The New York Times has reported that in 2023, during the War in Sudan, the United Arab Emirates set up a base at the airport in Amdjarass, to support the Rapid Support Forces in the war. The UAE has also provided financial support to the Chad military junta, despite officially declaring a neutral stance in the conflict as a Western ally.
