= Ennedi (region) =

Coordinates: 17°11′N 21°35′E

- Region
- Map of Chad showing the former region of Ennedi.
- Country: Chad
- Departments: 2
- Sub-prefectures: 10
- Created: 2008
- Dissolved: 4 September 2012
- Regional capital: Fada

Government
  - Governor: Mahamat Saleh Brahim (2010)

Population (2009)
  - Total: 173,606

Ennedi Region was a former region of Chad. Ennedi it's a zaghawa (the people who live in this area) name that means "the good home". It was created in 2008 from the Ennedi Est Department and Ennedi Ouest Department of the former Borkou-Ennedi-Tibesti Region. The capital of the Ennedi region was Fada. In 2012 it was split into two new regions: the department of Wadi Hawar became Ennedi-Est Region and the department of Ennedi became Ennedi-Ouest Region.

Per the census of 2009, the population of the region was 173,606, 45.20 per cent female. The total number of households was 24,784: 23,977 in rural areas and 807 in urban areas. The number of nomads in the region was 27,759, 7.20 per cent of the population. The sex ratio was 121.00 females for every hundred males.

== Demographics ==
Per the census of 2009, the population of the region was 173,606, 45.20 per cent female. The average size of household as of 2009 is 5.90: 5.90 in rural households and 5.40 in urban areas. The total number of households was 24,784: 23,977 in rural areas and 807 in urban areas. The number of nomads in the region was 27,759, 7.20 per cent of the total population. There were 146,913 people residing in private households. There were 70,730 above 18 years of age: 38,011 male and 32,719 female. The sex ratio was 121.00 females for every hundred males. There were 145,847 sedentary staff, 1.40 of the population.

== Geography ==
Chad has a general elevation of 240 m (790 ft) in Lake Chad Depression towards Guera massif located at an elevation of 1,800 m (5,900 ft) and eastwards towards mountainous Saharan region of 3,350 m (10,990 ft). The only rivers in the country of importance are Chari and Logone, flowing into Lake Chad. The region receives an annual rainfall of 250 mm (9.8 in) to 500 mm (20 in) and has savannah woodland region. There are open grasslands and it is predominantly covered with pastures. There is limited amount of groundnut and local grains. During the drought of 1970s and 1980s, the region was heavily affected and the number of cattle herds has reduced. The northernmost zone of the region has sparse rainfall and desert vegetation. The northern regions of the country is believed to have significant amount of Uranium deposits.

== Administration ==
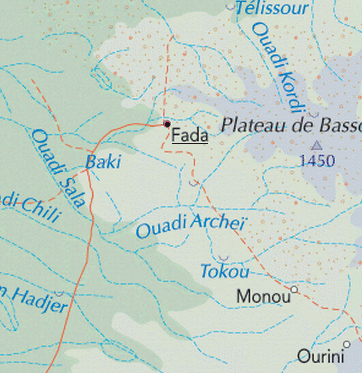
Location of the capital Fada

Ennedi Region was divided into two departments, namely, Ennedi Department (Capital of Fada) and Wadi Hawar (capital of Amdjarass). Chad became independent in 1961 from the French Colonial Empire. On account of ensuing political instability and local civil wars, it continued as a one party democracy till 1991, while other parties were also allowed. All the powers rested centrally with the President. As a part of decentralization in February 2003, the country is administratively split into regions, departments, municipalities and rural communities. The prefectures which were originally 14 in number were re-designated in 17 regions. The regions are administered by Governors appointed by the President. The Prefects, who originally held the responsibility of the 14 prefects, still retained the titles and were responsible for the administration of smaller departments in each region. The members of local assemblies are elected every six years, while the executive organs are elected every three years. As of 2016, there are totally 23 regions in Chad, which are divided based on population and administrative convenience.

In 2012 it was split into two new regions: the department of Wadi Hawar became Ennedi-Est Region and the department of Ennedi became Ennedi-Ouest Region.
