= Borkou-Ennedi-Tibesti (region) =

Region of Chad

Coordinates: 17.9167°N 19.1167°E

Borkou-Ennedi-Tibesti region
- Region of Chad
- 2008
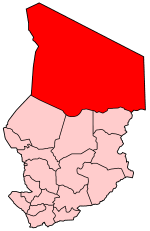
- Map of Borkou-Ennedi-Tibesti
- Capital: Faya-Largeau
- Population
- 286.986
- Historical era: 20th century, 21st century
Succeeded by
Borkou Region
Ennedi Region
Tibesti Region

The Borkou-Ennedi-Tibesti (BET) was until 2008 one of the then 18 regions of Chad, its capital being Faya-Largeau. It comprised the former Borkou-Ennedi-Tibesti Prefecture. Most of the region was part of the Sahara desert.

In 2008, this region was split into three new regions: Borkou Region, Ennedi Region, and the Tibesti Region.

== Subdivisions ==
The region of Borkou-Ennedi-Tibesti was formerly divided into 4 departments:

Department	Capital	Sub-prefectures
Borkou	Faya-Largeau	Borkou Yala, Faya-Largeau, Kouba Olanga, Yebibou, Yarda
Ennedi Est	Bahaï	Bahaï, Bao Billiat, Kaoura, Mourdi
Ennedi Ouest	Fada	Fada, Gouro, Kalait, Ounianga
Tibesti	Bardaï	Aouzou, Bardaï, Wour, Zouar, Zoumri

== Demography ==
The region had a population of 70,603 inhabitants in 1993, of whom 59,479 are sedentary and 11,124 nomad. In 2009, the BET counted 286,986 inhabitants.

The main ethno-linguistic groups are the Zaghawa and the Toubou.

== Natural history ==
There is a variety of fauna and flora in this region. Previously the Chadian wild dog (Lycaon pictus sharicus) had populations in this region, but they are now regarded as extirpated from the area, due to activities of humans as well as desertification, a phenomenon associated with the expanding human population.
