= Tibesti (region) =

Province of Chad

Coordinates: 21°21′16″N 17°00′04″E

Tibesti تيبستي
- Province
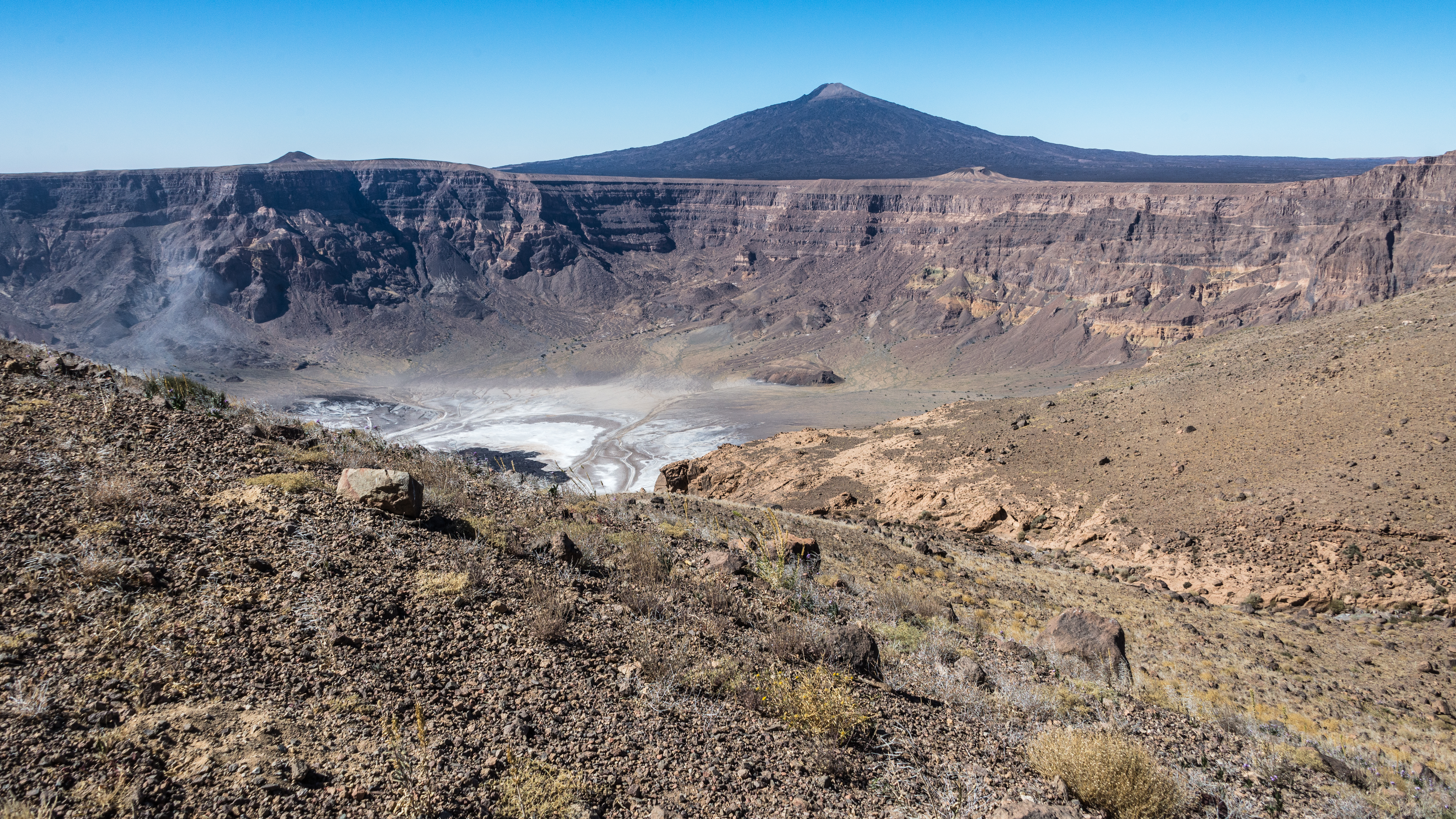
- Trou au Natron caldera and Toussidé

- Map of Chad showing Tibesti.
- Country: Chad
- Departments: 2
- Sub-prefectures: 7
- Region: 2008
- Capital: Bardaï

Population (2009)
  - Total: 25,483
- The 2009 census figure is an official estimate.
- Time zone: UTC+01:00 (WAT)

Tibesti Region (Arabic: مقاطعة تيبستي) is a province of Chad, located in far northwest of the country. Its capital is Bardaï. It was created in 2008 when the former Borkou-Ennedi-Tibesti Region was split into three, with the Tibesti Department becoming the Tibesti Region. The region is named for the Tibesti Mountains, one of the most prominent mountain chains in the Sahara Desert. Tibesti is the least populated region of Chad and also has the lowest GDP in the country.

== History ==
=== Ancient history ===
The rock paintings and engravings in Tibesti bear witness to an ancient civilization from 25,000 BC. There are rock engravings in the area of Zouar, featuring, among others, cows eating fresh grass, attesting to the wet past of the Sahara. The area has historically been mainly inhabited by the Toubou people.

=== Age of Colonisation ===
In 1869, Gustav Nachtigal was sent by Prussian Chancellor Otto von Bismarck to contact the Sultan of Bornu, and was the first European to travel the Tibesti region from Zouar to Bardaï. Condemned by the traditional assembly of the Toubou to capital punishment for espionage, he appealed, but this was rejected. He was only released upon the intervention of Maï Arami Tetimi. Upon his return to Germany, he published the book Sahara and the Sudan detailing his experiences.

The capital, Bardaï, was invaded by the Ottoman Empire in 1908, and by 1911 they had 60 men and 6 cannons in the town.

The area fell under French rule during the Scramble for Africa in the late 19th century. Prior to 1931 much of the region belonged to what is now Niger as part of the French West Africa colony.

=== First Chadian Civil War ===
==== Claustre Affair ====
in 1974, during the First Chadian Civil War, rebels led by Toubou nationalist Hissène Habré captured French archaeologist Françoise Claustre, Marc Combe (also French), an assistant to Mrs. Claustre's husband, and Christoph Staewen, a German physician. Stray bullets killed Staewen's wife. The trio were captured near Bardaï in the desert of the Tibesti Region. Combe later escaped and Staewen was released after a ransom was paid by the German government. Combe would later write a book about his experiences, Otage au Tibesti.

Rebels also established a radio station in Bardaï called "Voice of the Liberation of Chad", also known as Radio Free Bardaï. An opposition leader, Goukouni Oueddei, established a base in the Tibesti region in the early 1980s with Libyan military backing. In December, 1986, Habré attacked the Libyans in the Tibesti region around Bardaï.

==== Post-war ====
In the late 2000s-early 2010s gold was discovered in the region, prompting a gold rush which has brought much insecurity to the region. In September 2019 about 30 people died following the collapse of an illegal gold mine in Kouri Bougoudi.

=== 2021 offensive ===
An offensive from the Front for Change and Concord in Chad (FACT) rebel group began in the region on the day of the 2021 Chadian presidential election. On 20 April, President Idriss Déby was killed while visiting the frontlines of the conflict; the country's borders were shut down as a result of this.

== Geography ==
The Tibesti Region borders the Murzuq District in Libya to the north, Borkou Region to the east, and Diffa and Agadez Regions in Niger to the west. The most northerly of Chad's regions, it is sparsely populated, being part of the Sahara Desert. It contains parts of the Tibesti Mountains, and also part of the Erg of Bilma, a vast area of sand dunes in the centre of the desert. The region's northern border lies within the Aouzou Strip, historically a point of dispute between Chad and Libya.

=== Settlements ===
The regional capital is Bardaï; other major settlements include Aouzou, Goubonne, Wour, Zouar and Zoumri.

== Demographics ==
The region had a population of 25,483 at the time of the 2009 Chadian census. The main ethnolinguistic group is the Tedaga Toubou.

== Subdivisions ==
The region of Tibesti is divided into two departments:

Department	Capital	Sub-prefectures
Tibesti Est	Bardaï	Bardaï, Zoumri, Aouzou, Yebbibou
Tibesti Ouest	Zouar	Zouar, Wour, Goubonne
