= West African manuscripts =

Manuscripts of West Africa

West African manuscripts are abundant and diverse in content and form, such as books, documents, and letters, and are composed in the Arabic script, Ajami script, and indigenous African scripts. West African manuscripts, as dialogical products of West African manuscript culture and components of West African intellectual history, may have been produced as early as the 10th century CE. West African Muslim scholars, who were bilingual or multilingual and constituted what is collectively a West African intelligentsia that shaped West African historiography, composed the majority of West African manuscripts. West African countries with manuscripts from the precolonial, colonial, and postcolonial periods include Togo, Sierra Leone, Senegal, Nigeria, Niger, Mauritania, Mali, Guinea, Ghana, Gambia, Ivory Coast, Cameroon, Burkina Faso, and Benin. The Timbuktu manuscripts in Timbuktu, Mali, which are the most well known set of manuscripts in West Africa, are estimated in number to total between 101,820 manuscripts and 348,531 manuscripts.

West African manuscripts contain topics of alchemy, arithmetic, astrology, astronomy, biographies, business records and discussions, chemistry, chronicles, commerce, currency, dialectology, diplomacy between European and African rulers in the pre-colonial era, disease and cure, divination and geomancy, ethics and peace, eulogies, genealogies, geography, government legislations and treaties, healing, history, incantations, Islamic sciences, saints, and rituals, jurisprudence, instructions on codes of conduct, language and grammar, law, lists of kings and imams, literature, logic, medicine, numerology, official correspondence, pharmacology, philosophy, poetry, political economy, politics, private letters, prose, slavery, slave trade, and freedom, sociology, speeches, talismanic resources, theology, therapeutic medical manuals, and the science of calendars. The existence of West African manuscripts refute prevailing past racist notions that, Africa as a continent and Sub-Saharan Africa as its sub-region, were regions of the world that were without literature and that were limited to only ritual and orature. West African manuscripts also have the potential to revise the history of the West African Sahel and the history of West Africa, at-large. as well as facilitate further decolonization of the history of Africa. However, although West African manuscripts are plentiful, esteemed in academia and the media, and have been subject to numerous institutional initiatives to be preserved and digitized, there has been a limited amount of philological research done on West African manuscripts, due to a collective academic "hypertrophy of theory," "devaluation of the strictly textual in favor of the oral and the visual," "growing indifference to and incapacity in foreign languages, especially historical languages," and "shallow presentism of scholarship and even antipathy to the past," which has resulted in the retention of a "griot paradigm" within Africanist scholarship.

== Countries ==
West African countries with manuscripts from the precolonial, colonial, and postcolonial periods include Togo, Sierra Leone, Senegal, Nigeria, Niger, Mauritania, Mali, Guinea, Ghana, Gambia, Ivory Coast, Cameroon, Burkina Faso, and Benin.

=== Mali ===
The Timbuktu manuscripts in Timbuktu, Mali, which are the most well known set of manuscripts in West Africa, are estimated in number to total between 101,820 manuscripts and 348,531 manuscripts.

=== Mauritania ===
Arabic Literature of Africa, Volume 5: The Writings of Mauritania and the Western Sahara, compiled by Charles C. Stewart with Sidi Ahmed Wuld Ahmed Salim and published by Brill in 2015, documents approximately 1,875 authors and nearly 10,000 works.

=== Nigeria ===
In the 1990s, a "lower estimate" of the Arabic-Islamic manuscripts in Nigeria concluded with 127 collections and more than 27,000 manuscripts, based on the catalogues of the Al-Furqan Islamic Heritage Foundation. However, Mauro Nobili, a historian specializing in pre-colonial and early-colonial West Africa attached to the University of Illinois Urbana-Champaign, asserted in 2012 that in later years the research in West African manuscripts has accelerated, and thus estimating the final count to be likely higher. He extended this analysis to the other West African nations.

=== Niger ===
Over the decades the Département des Manuscrits Arabes et Ajami (MARA), a department of the city’s Abdou Moumouni University, has catalogued over 4,000 manuscripts.

== Scholarship ==
=== Authors ===
West African Muslim scholars, who were bilingual or multilingual and constituted what is collectively a West African intelligentsia that shaped West African historiography, composed the majority of West African manuscripts; most of the manuscripts were composed in the Ajami script and Arabic script. Some of the West African Muslim scholars and authors include: Muhammad b. Malik al-Andalusi al-Jayani al-Dimashqi (d. 1238), Ahmad b. Muhmmad b. Isa al-Burnusi al-Fasi (d. 1493), Abd al-Rahman b. Abu Bakr al-Suyuti (d. 1505), Ali b. al-Qasim al-Tijibi (d. 1507), Abd al-Rahman al-Akhdari (d. 1575), Ahmad bin Furtu, Muhammad ibn al-Sabbagh (fl. 1640), Abu Abdullahi Muhammad b. Masanih (1595–1667), Hasan b. Masud al-Yusi (d. 1691), Muhammad ibn Muhammad al-Fulani al-Kishwani (1699–1741), Muhammad al-Yadali b. al-Mukhtar b. Maham Sacid al-Daymani (d. 1751), Ahmad b. 'Abd al-Aziz al-Hilali (d. 1761), Mukhtar b. Buna al-Jakani (d. 1800), Sidi al-Mukhtar b. Abu Bakr al-Kunti (d. 1811), Sidi Abd Allah b. al-Haj Ibrahim al-Alawi (d. 1818), Sidi Muhammad b. Sidi al-Mukhtar (d. 1825), Nūḥ b. al-Ṭāhir al-Fulānī (d. 1860), Uthman dan Fodio and his daughter, Nana Asma'u (1793–1864), Muhammad Bello, Muhammad Bukhari bin Uthman, Abd al-Qadir dan Tafa, Muhammad al-Amin al-Kanemi (1776–1837), Sidiyya "al-Kabir" b. al-Mukhtar b. al-Hayba al-Ntishai 'i (d. 1868), Sidi Muhammad b. Sidiyya "al-Kabir" (d. 1869), Muhammad Fal b. Mutali al-Tandaghi (d. 1870), Muhammad al-Mami b. al-Bukhari al-Barikalli al-Shamshawi (d. 1875), Xaali Majaxate Kala (1835–1902), Muhammad Mawlud b. Ahmad Fal al-Musawi al-Yaqubi (d. 1905), Muhammad Fal b. Muhammadhan b. Ahmad b. al-Aqil al-Daymani (d. 1915/16), Abd al-Qadir b. Abd Allah b. Muhammad b. Muhammad Salim al-Majlisi (d. 1918/19), Baba b. Sidi Muhammad b. Sidiyya (d. 1924), Shaykh Ahmadu Bamba (1853–1927), Muhammad Ahmad b. Mahmud b. al-Rabbani al-Tandaghi (d. 1935), Shaykh Muusaa Kamara (1864–1945), Moor Kayre (1869–1951), Samba Jaara Mbay (1870–1917), Mbay Jaxate (1875–1954), Muusaa Ka (1889–1963), Muḥammad al-Hāshimī b. Aḥmad b. Sa‘īd/Alfa Hāshim (d. 1931–1932), Muhammad Mahmud b. Abd al-Fattah al-Abyiri (d. 1970s), Muhammad b. Abu Madyan al-Daymani (d. 1976), Harun b. Baba b. Sidi Muhammad (d. 1978), Ismail b. Baba b. Sidi Muhammad (d. 1988), and Mamadou Cissé (1897–1993). Other authors also include Muhammad b. Yusuf al-Ḥasani al-Sanusi, Muhammad b. Sulaymān b. Abi Bakr al-Jazuli al-Taghtini al-Simlāli, Muhammad Abd al-Wadud b. Hammayh al-Abyiri, Muhammad b. Abd al-Salam al-Bannani, al-Mustafa Suware ibn Yirimaghan Suware, and al-Hajj Drame.

The works of Muhammad b. Yusuf al-Ḥasani al-Sanusi is referenced 513 times in other West African manuscripts and the works of Muhammad b. Sulaymān b. Abi Bakr al-Jazuli al-Taghtini al-Simlāli is referenced 521 times. Some West African Muslim scholars were members of the Murīdiyya, Tijāniyya, and Laayeen.

=== Scripts ===
West African manuscripts are composed in the Arabic script, Ajami script, and indigenous African scripts. The orthographic ajamization of the Aramaic script, which produced the Arabic script, preceded the orthographic ajamization of indigenous African languages. Arabic composition styles for West African manuscripts were primarily developed as distinct composition styles in the Sahelo-Saharan belt region of Mali and Mauritania, and in Bornu, Nigeria, which subsequently developed as a combined form of these distinct composition styles in Macina, Mali. Among the West African manuscripts composed in the Ajami script, the following languages are included: Dagbani, Fulfulde, Hausa, Kanuri, Mande languages (e.g., Bambanankan, Jula, Jakhanke, Maninka, Mandinka, Soninke, Susu), Pular, Songhay, Tamasheq, Wolof, Yoruba, Zarma, and Zenaga. West African manuscripts contain scripts such as Vai, Garay, and N’Ko.

=== Translation and exegesis ===
Bozo, Hausa, Soninke, and Tarjumo languages are some West African languages used in modern oral exegesis of the Quran and its translation from Arabic into those West African languages.

== Manuscripts ==
=== Quantity ===
In the 1990s CE, excluding those held in Europe, North America, and North Africa, West African manuscripts held in West African countries were estimated to be: 27,000 manuscripts in Mauritania, 24,000 manuscripts in Nigeria, 5,500 manuscripts in Mali, 5,171 manuscripts in Ivory Coast, 3,537 manuscripts in Niger, 2,797 manuscripts in Guinea, 2,342 manuscripts in Burkina Faso, 1,494 manuscripts in Gambia, 1,333 manuscripts in Senegal, 1,114 manuscripts in Togo, 754 manuscripts in Sierra Leone, 703 manuscripts in Guinea Bissau, 375 manuscripts in Ghana, 104 manuscripts in Cameroon, 30 manuscripts in Benin, and no manuscripts in Liberia.

As of 2008 CE, the Timbuktu manuscripts were estimated in total to be 101,820 manuscripts, which shows the need for the total estimated amount of West African manuscripts to be revised. As of 2021 CE, Timbuktu manuscripts were estimated in total to be 348,531 manuscripts.

=== Designs ===
The title of West African manuscripts, along with the name of those who own them, are frequently set within a decorative frame along the edges of the manuscripts. Some of the earliest West African manuscripts in Mauritania were composed on the gazelle skin and has been dated to the 10th century CE. Qurans possessed designs with "colorful illuminations, geometric decorative figures, and calligraphies" and manuscripts were retained in colorfully designed bookcases made of leather.

=== Contents ===
West African manuscripts contain topics of alchemy, arithmetic, astrology, astronomy, biographies, business records and discussions (e.g., labor and agriculture), chemistry, chronicles, commerce, currency (e.g., gold), dialectology, diplomacy between European and African rulers in the pre-colonial era, disease and cure, divination and geomancy, ethics and peace, eulogies, genealogies, geography, government legislations and treaties, healing, history (e.g., local histories), incantations, Islamic sciences, saints, and rituals (e.g., pillars of the Islamic faith, translations and commentaries of the Quran in various scripts including the Wolof Ajami script, Sufism), jurisprudence, instructions on codes of conduct, language and grammar (e.g., Arabic language and grammar, African languages), law (e.g., laws of inheritance), lists of kings and imams, literature, logic, medicine, numerology, official correspondence, pharmacology, philosophy, poetry (e.g., satirical, polemical, and protest poetry), political economy, politics (e.g., politics in the Songhay empire), private letters (e.g., letters that provide insight on the history of Northern Ghana), prose, slavery, slave trade, and freedom, sociology, speeches, talismanic resources, theology, therapeutic medical manuals, and the science of calendars.

West African manuscripts, some of which date between the 16th century CE to the 18th century CE, contain one of the earliest copies of the Tārīkh al-Sudān, which was initially composed in the 17th century CE. West African manuscripts of Boutilimit, Mauritania contain the "world’s only known complete manuscript of a work on grammar", which was composed by Ibn Rushd. West African manuscripts of Ségou, Mali, contain manuscripts detailing a jihad in West Africa that was led by Al-Hāj Umar Taal, who lived from 1797 CE and 1864 CE and was the leader of the Fuuta Tooro Tijāniyya. West African manuscripts of the late 19th century CE and the early 20th century CE northern Ghana, Mali, Nigeria, and Senegal contain Arabic grammar, astronomy, history, law, medicine and healing, numerology, poetry, Sufism, and theology, including chronicles, letters, and lists (e.g., kings lists, imam lists). Additionally, West African manuscripts of northern Ghana, Mali, Nigeria, and Senegal contain Fulfulde, Hausa, and Wolof Ajami market editions and a copy of the Book of Genesis composed in Fulfulde Ajami. Further, West African manuscripts of Nigeria contain Quran manuscripts, nine that have been dated to 1669 CE and others that have been dated to the early 19th century CE. West African manuscripts from Timbuktu, Mali, dated between 1600 CE and 1960 CE, also contain local ideas and discussions about race in Saharan and Sahelian West Africa. Regarding legal discourse on the wrongful enslavement of Muslims in West Africa, Hall (2018) states:

The earliest mention of the issue of the wrongful enslavement of Muslims in a text written in West Africa is in Muhammad ‘Abd al-Karim al-Magili's replies to Askia Muhammad, ruler of the Songhay Empire, written in 1498. In it, al-Magili wrote, 'As for him whom you find in their hands enslaved but who claims that he is free, then his word is to be taken, even though he used to admit to slave status before them, then later claims that [he did this because] he was afraid of them.'33 The important issue for legal scholars was whether one should believe an enslaved person's claims to be a free Muslim, and under what circumstances.34 Al-Magili took a very generous position with respect to enslaved person's claims, arguing that they were to be believed, even in the case where the enslaved had previously admitted to having carried slave status. But Ahmad Baba's text written in 1615 is the best-known legal discussion of wrongful enslavement in the Muslim intellectual tradition in West Africa. Famously, Ahmad Baba laid out a series of arguments that sought to defend the legitimacy of the free Muslim status of many among the 'Blacks' who found themselves wrongfully enslaved. The issue was taken up by a number of prominent West African scholars subsequently.

West African manuscripts contain copies of the Ten Commandments and the New Testament, which were composed after 1727 CE. West African manuscripts also contain a copy of Risāla al-Qayrawāniyya that was composed for the Songhai ruler, Muḥammad Bāni b. Askiya Dāwūd, in July 19, 1587 CE and a copy of Mukhtaṣar al-Khalīl, which was composed, possibly in Kano, Nigeria, in the 16th century CE.

West African manuscripts of northern Nigeria that spans 500 years also contain seven bilingual texts composed in Arabic and Old Kanembu, numerous copies of the Quran, and more than three thousand folios. West African manuscripts from northern Nigeria contain local formulas for bravery, diagnosis and medicinal treatment of diverse illnesses, divination and geomancy, enhancing the sexual performance of men and women, good heath, popularity, protection from evil spirits, resolving conflicts among couples, wealth, and winning court cases as well as a copy of Muammar Gaddafi's Green Book composed in Ajami and a copy of Reverend Dantine Garba Malumfashi's Book of Genesis, which was composed in Hausa Ajami and was used in his church since 2006. West African manuscripts of Nigeria, which date between the 18th century CE and the 20th century CE, contain compositions on the economic and political history of the Sokoto caliphate, compositions on the colonial history of Northern Nigeria, local chronicles, legal documents, religious literature, letters from the leaders of Katsina and Kano, and poems of Shaykh Uthman Dan Fodio and his daughter, Nana Asma'u (1793–1864) as well as compositions from his companions.

West African manuscripts of Senegambia contain a secular, bilingual, Wolof-French treaty, negotiated between the Senegambian king of Bar and the French king, Louis XVIII, in 1817 CE, which starts with a common Muslim opening doxology in Arabic and continues in Wolofal, detailing the appropriate payment for a construction of a trading post in the northern region of the Gambia River; the treaty is the "oldest Wolof Ajami document uncovered in Senegambia to date" and shows that "Wolof Ajami once served as a valid diplomatic language in pre-colonial Senegambia, though its practitioners have now been treated as illiterate in official literacy statistics subsequent to the colonial experience." West African manuscripts of northern Senegal contain an excerpt from a well-known Fulani Ajami poem of 1,200 verses, which was composed by Mohammadou Aliou Tyam between 1890 CE and 1899 CE in Fuuta Tooro, Senegal. West African manuscripts of Gambia contain Muslim court records, which were composed in Arabic between 1927 CE and 1954 CE and that provide details of the struggles between elites and commoners, men and women, and the elderly and the young, as well as police records that were composed in English.

West African manuscripts from Dakar, Senegal contain a prescribed formula for success in hunting, a composition on Fula dialectology, a shopkeeper’s notebook listing the debts of his customers, and notebook excerpts of Fuuta Jalon immigrants residing in Dakar who sent money transfers and freights to relatives residing in various locations of Guinea. West African manuscripts, which included a 1942 CE poem authored by Mamadou Cissé as a result of the ill impacts of World War II on Sédhiou, contain imprecation intended to cause the death of Ikileer (Adolf Hitler) and the elimination of his armies. West African manuscripts also include a medicinal manual, an introductory Arabic grammar text for Ajami users, and a tribute to the mother of Sëriñ Mustafaa Si, who was a significant Tijāniyya figure in Senegal. Additionally, West African manuscripts contain the letter of a man from Fuuta Jalon that provided updates about his life residing in Ziguinchor, Senegal and about his sister's wedding, which was sent to his relatives in Ivory Coast. Further, West African manuscripts contain a poem recalling the Quranic school years and the praise of former classmates of a Quranic teacher residing in Saint Louis and a bookseller's records, from Fuuta Tooro and composed in Fulani Ajami, which provides various details relating to his shop (e.g., inventory of the books, prices, other financial transactions). Furthermore, West African manuscripts contain a list from Imam Nimbaly Thiam of Casamance, Senegal, who died in the 2015 Mina stampede in Saudi Arabia, regarding customers who sought Istikhāra, which are Islamic divination services. West African manuscripts also contain Ajami compositions translated into Latin, Arabic compositions of religious leaders translated into French, and market editions of Ajami and Arabic devotional materials. West African manuscripts by Siré Abbàs Soh, as communicated by Yoro Dyao, detailed six migrations from Egypt to Senegambia.

West African manuscripts contain record of the "enthronement of Askiyà Dāwūd (d. 1583) in 958/1551–1552. The texts of Cahiers n°s 2 and 5 record the same events, often described verbatim, for the earlier period. However, for more recent times, the two texts substantially differ. Cahier n° 2 records events until 1328/1910 with the death of a certain ‘Abd al-Qādir al-Gannānī b. sīdī al-Mukhtār (f. 18b). Cahier n° 5 stops some years earlier, in Dhū-l-hijja 1321/1903–1904 with the record of the death of Aḥmad b. Muḥammad ‘Abd Allāh b. Aḥmad b. Ibrāhīm (f. 21b). According to the colophon, Cahier 2 was achieved in 1329/1910 by one Sīdī Muḥammad b. ‘Āli Daḥḥān (f. 18b). As for Cahier n° 5, the colophon records that the text was copied by a certain Sīdī Aḥmad b. Muḥammad b. al-S.N. on behalf of one shaykh ‘Abd Allāh b. al-imām with no reference to the date (f. 20b)." West African also manuscripts contain Dhikr bilād Mallī, which is the "main text is a chronicle of the region that, after a preliminary analysis, looks completely abstracted from the Tārīkh al-sūdān. It comprises the following sections: Dhikr Mallī (f. 1a–b), on the Mali state from Tārīkh al-sūdān, chapter 4; Dhikr Janna (ff. 1b–2a), on the town of Jenne, from Tārīkh al-sūdān, chapter 5; Dhikr Timbuktu (ff. 2a–2b), on Timbuktu, from Tārīkh al-sūdān, chapter 7; Dhikr ta‘rīf al-Tawāriq and Dhikr khurūjihim min al-Yaman (f. 2b), on the Tuaregs, from Tārīkh al-sūdān, chapter 8; a long Dhikr mulūk Songhay (ff. 3a–8a) including the history of the Zā’, the Sonni and the Askiyà dynasties until the Moroccan conquest, from Tārīkh al-sūdān, chapters 2–3 and 13–24; Aṣl salāṭīn Māsina (f. 8a–8b), on the kings of Masina, from Tārīkh al-sūdān, chapter 26; and a final section Sīdī Yaḥyà b. ‘Abd al-Raḥīm b. ‘Abd al-Raḥmād al-Tha‘ālibī al-Tadallisī (f. 8b–9a), from Tārīkh al-sūdān, chapter 10." Additionally, West African manuscripts contain a history of the populations of the Timbuktu region, Tārīkh Iwellemedan, and the Risāla fī ẓuhūr al-khalīfa al-thānī ‘ashar, which was composed by Nūḥ b. al-Ṭāhir al-Fulānī (d. 1860) as a "propaganda pamphlet" on behalf of the leader of the Fulani Empire of Masina, Aḥmad b. Muḥammad Būbū al-Fulānī/Aḥmad Lobbo (d. 1845), one version for Saharan people and another version for sultans throughout the Islamic world. Further, West African manuscripts contain two copies of an apparently anonymous Fulfulde poem of ninety-nine verses, Mā shajara bayna al-shaykh al-ḥājj ‘Umar al-Fūtī wa-amīr Māsina al-shaykh Aḥmad b. Aḥmad ‘inda Hamdallāhi. Furthermore, West African manuscripts contain a well-known Fulani composition, Ta‘rīf al-‘ashā’ir wa-l-khillān bi-shu‘ūb wa-qabā’il al-Fullān, which was composed by Alfa Hāshim (d. 1931–1932).

==== Marginalia ====
West African manuscript marginalia were largely not found on Nigerian manuscripts, such as in Sokoto, Nigeria. Out of 100 sampled manuscripts from Timbuktu, Mali, 39 sampled manuscripts were found to have marginalia present. Timbuktu marginalia consisted of addenda, corrections, clarifications and commentaries, and highlighting of specific portions of text in the manuscripts. Additionally, there were some marginalia that bore no direct relevance to the areas of texts where they were found, and thus, were independent fragments; for example, "the main text is the story of Yusuf, and the marginalia, written in the right margin perpendicular to the main text, comments on a bird of paradise" and a "note located horizontally in the upper margin consists of a prayer for the protection of the manuscript." However, most of these independent fragments were often located at the beginning and end of West African manuscripts; for example, there were explications of the Islamic West abjad system, which is a "numeral system in which the twenty-eight letters of the Arabic alphabet are assigned numerical values. The system, consisting of eight mnemotechnical terms, varies substantially in the Islamic East and West." Other examples include a "note on the verso of the last folio next to the colophon, concerning the appropriate way for a man to behave with his wife so as not to become impotent" and marginalia "in the top right corner written horizontally is a prayer to be recited before reading the manuscript; the upper half of the page contains a commented poem – marginalia within a marginalia so to speak – of Ahmad Baba with an explanation of the solar months and their calculations; the 'poem of the ant', still recited in Timbuktu today to ask for rain, is located on the bottom right of the page and written perpendicularly; finally, on the bottom left of the page and also written perpendicularly is a commentary on fathers and sons." There were also marginalia composed of ownership statements and reading of text, such as: "I read this poem from my teacher who heard it from Ahmad Baba [d. 1627]."

Regarding West African manuscripts and 19th century CE Brazilian manuscripts, "'[e]arlier manuscripts often include both father and mother of the scribe ("son of X and Y") or even the name of his mother alone', while '[m]ore recent manuscripts, especially those written in colonial and post-colonial West Africa, tend to be patrifocal' and therefore contain only the name of the scribe's father." West African manuscripts contain a copy of "al-Risala by Ibn Abi Zayd al-Qayrawani (d. 996). It is a treatise on Maliki law, 'which has been used as a textbook for religious instructions throughout the Sahara and Western Sudan until today'. A few commentaries and glosses were added to the main text, but most prominent paratextual element in this manuscript is a colophon at the end of the manuscript, which is arranged in three columns"; furthermore, the "text of the first column consists of several forumulae which ask God for forgiveness for the scribe, his family and all Muslims. It also states that the writing was finished on Friday. The second column includes the name of the scribe and where he lived, and reads: The name of its scribe is Abdallah ibn Shaykh Malik from the place of Fugumba Seriyanke. The place name provided in the colophon apparently refers to Fugumba, one of the nine provinces of Futa Jallon in Guinea ruled by Seriyanke, the oligarchic lineage or Islamic clerical lineage descendant of Fode Seri." West African manuscripts also contain an "additional sheet, found inside the manuscript, [which] bears a note written by Octave by Houdas and reads "ecritures du XVIII et du commencement du XIX siècle. (Provient du Soudan)" ("writing of the eighteenth to early nineteenth century (of the Sudanic origin)"). The manuscript contains a religious poem on tawhid called Jawahir min al-kalam by Ibn Sulaym al-Awjili (d. 1801/2). The main text is arranged with wide interlinear and marginal spaces and is enriched by glosses in Arabic and Soninke, some of which are written in black ink and some in brownish ink. The text is concluded by two short colophons. Interestingly, these two colophons seem to be composed in vernacular language that differs from that of the glosses. On account of their linguistic features, I believe these colophons were written in a language close to Mandinka (both colophons also contain several Arabic words)"; one colophon states, "The small book by (ibn) Sulayma is completed. Property of Muhammad Bajaka, Madina Findifeto. Praise be to God", and the other colophon states, "It belongs to Majinka Samura. Arafan Burahima Jawara prepared it. He finished it on Thursday."; furthermore, from "these two colophons we learn that the copying of this manuscript was finished on a Thursday and the place of its production was probably Madina Findifeto. The linguistic features of the colophons suggest that the manuscript originates from somewhere in southern Senegal, the Gambia or Guinea-Bissau. In fact, the place name from the first colophon may correspond to two possible locations in the designated area. A locality called Findifeto is situated within the modern borders of the Gambia (Kantora, Upper River Region). However, there is also another place called Madina Findifeto in southern Senegal, as mentioned in the third part of the Pakao Book and in some oral traditions." West African manuscripts contain an anonymously authored composition on cosmogony written on six folios and includes a colophon that states: "Finished here on Sunday by the hand of its scribe, who is al-Mustafa Suware ibn Yirimaghan Suware, in the place of Suwarekunda"; regarding the location, there "are several references to Suwarekunda (or Souare Counda) and one of them is mentioned in the studies written by Lamine Sanneh and Taslimaka Sylla respectively. Both authors mention Suwarekunda as the name of one of the clerical wards that form the Jakha settlement located in the Bambukhu region of eastern Senegal"; another possible location is "an important scholarly centre in Badibu (also spelt 'Baddibu' or 'Badibbu'), the Gambia", which was "once predominantly populated by Mandinka people, the original settlers, as it is evidenced in the name of the city, were Jakhanke"; additionally, "Lamin Sanneh’s description of the life of al-Hajj Salim Gassama (Karamogo Ba), we find in the list of his students the name of Yirimaghan Suware, who lived in Badibu-Suwarekunda in the eighteenth century." West African manuscripts contain "a copy of the poem Dalil al-qa’id li-kashf asar sifat al-wahid by Ibn Sulaym al-Awjili. Given the fact that Ibn Sulaym al-Awjili died in 1801/2 and this manuscript was acquired in Segou in 1890, it should be safe to suggest that it was produced sometime in the nineteenth century before 1890"; additionally, the second text includes "the Ida'at al-dujunna fi 'aqa' ahl al-sunna composed by Algerian author Ahmad b. Muhammad al-Maqqari (d. 1632)" and the colophon: "The owner is Abubakar ibn 'Uthman Sayawiyun. The name of the place is Mamakono"; further, the third text is entitled "Tajrid fi ka-limat al-tawhid and is a commentary on the attributes of God by Ahmad b. Muhammad al-Ghazali (d. 1123)"; furthermore, the "texts probably all once belonged to the library of the West African scholar Abubakar Sayawiyun, because the same name appears in each of their colophons."

==== African diaspora ====
West African manuscripts among the African diaspora were literature developed by enslaved West Africans, who, prior to their enslavement, were already literate.

=== Significance ===
The written sources of West African manuscripts and oral sources of West African Islamic culture have historically interacted, converged, and diverged in discourse since the post-classical period of the Western Sudan, and thus, were not historically isolated from one another. The existence of West African manuscripts refute prevailing past racist notions that, Africa as a continent and Sub-Saharan Africa as its sub-region, were regions of the world that were without literature and that were limited to only ritual and orature. West African manuscripts have the potential to revise the history of the West African Sahel and the history of West Africa, at-large. as well as facilitate further decolonization of the history of Africa. However, although West African manuscripts are plentiful, esteemed in academia and the media, and have been subject to numerous institutional initiatives to be preserved and digitized, there has been a limited amount of philological research done on West African manuscripts, due to a collective academic "hypertrophy of theory," "devaluation of the strictly textual in favor of the oral and the visual," "growing indifference to and incapacity in foreign languages, especially historical languages," and "shallow presentism of scholarship and even antipathy to the past," which has resulted in the retention of a "griot paradigm" within Africanist scholarship.

=== Digitization ===
The West African Arabic Manuscript Database (WAAMD), formerly known as AMMS, is a bi‑lingual online catalog of Arabic manuscripts from West Africa. It was initially developed at the University of Illinois in the late 1980s to document manuscripts from southern Mauritania (Boutilimit). Since then, it has evolved into a union catalogue that integrates collections from West Africa, Europe, and the United States.

Beginning in 2018, inventories from the SAVAMA‑DCI project in Timbuktu were incorporated, and the database continues to expand with data from additional West African libraries. Hosted by the Library of the University of California, Berkeley, WAAMD comprises five interactive datasets covering manuscripts, their authors, authors’ nisbas, subjects, and repositories.

The database is publicly accessible, with a search engine that can identify manuscripts and authors even from fragmentary information in Arabic or Latin characters. Where available, it includes links to digital images of the manuscripts. A free cataloguing application, supporting both Arabic and English descriptors, allows users to contribute and customize data entry for local needs.

Funding for WAAMD began with support from the National Endowment for the Humanities in 1991 and has also been supported by the University of Illinois at Urbana‑Champaign, Johns Hopkins University, Duke University, al‑Furqan Islamic Heritage Foundation, and the University of California, Berkeley.
