= Al-Hajj Musa ibn Hissein =

Muslim scholar, author and linguist of Kanuri origin (c.1870–?)

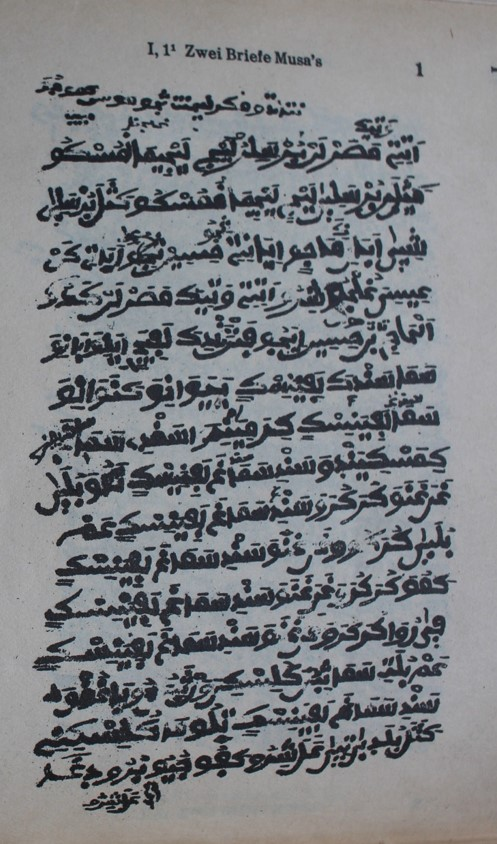
- Letter from al-Hajj Musa to his family, written in Kanuri Ajami script
- Born: c. 1870; Bursari, Yobe, Nigeria
- Died: unknown (still alive in 1925) probably Cairo, Egypt
- Occupations: Scholar, author, linguist
- Known for: Collaboration with Rudolf Prietze on Hausa and Kanuri texts

Al-Hajj Musa ibn Hissein (c. 1870 – ?) was a Muslim scholar, author and linguist of Kanuri origin. Born into a family of scholars in Bursari, present-day Nigeria, he became a teacher of the Quran before making the pilgrimage to Mecca. He subsequently studied at the Al-Aqsa Mosque and Al-Azhar University in Cairo, where he met the German philologist Rudolf Prietze. The two men collaborated for ten years, producing a significant collection of texts in both the Hausa and Kanuri languages documenting the popular culture of the central Sahel region.

Al-Hajj Musa is recognised by American linguist Paul Newman as the first person to identify the distinction between the two "r" sounds in the Hausa language.

== Biography ==
=== Childhood and training as a scholar in Bornu ===
Hissein was born around 1870 in the town of Bursari, situated in the Manga region of present-day Yobe, Nigeria, at that time located in the westerly regions of the sultanate of Bornu. Born into a family of Muslim scholars, he grew up in an intellectual environment: his father, Hissein, was a prominent figure in the local community and the director of a Qur'anic school. Since the role of scholar was hereditary in the learned societies of the 19th-century Sahara and Sahel, Hissein began his intellectual training from early childhood in his father's school.

Hissein's mother tongue was a dialect of Kanuri called Manga Kanuri. However, he grew up in a border region between the sultanate of Bornu and the sultanate of Sokoto, where Hausa was the lingua franca. During his training to become a Muslim scholar, he learned classical Arabic to read and recite the Qur'an, as well as Ajami — a writing system using Arabic script to transcribe certain African languages – and Old Kanembu, a liturgical language used by Muslim scholars in the central Sahel.

Around 1885, at approximately fifteen years of age, Hissein settled in Zinder, the capital of the Sultanate of Damagaram, to pursue further Qur'anic studies under Malam Mûmeni, a notable local scholar. After two years in Zinder, he became an Almajiri, adopting an itinerant way of life and travelling to various towns – including Daoura, Katsina, Maradi and Kano — to seek teaching from notable scholars and consult their libraries and manuscripts. He subsequently returned to Zinder, where he founded his own school and married a half-Kanuri, half-Hausa woman named Habiba.

In 1900 Hissein and his wife left the central Sahel to make the pilgrimage to Mecca. It is possible that the French colonial occupation of the sultanate of Damagaram in 1899 may have inspired this departure. At this time, many Muslim scholars from the central Sahel followed the practice of Hijra, seeking refuge in Islamic lands as they fled colonial occupation, such as the British defeat of the sultanate of Sokoto at the Battle of Burmi in 1903.

=== Pilgrimage and studies in Jerusalem and Cairo ===
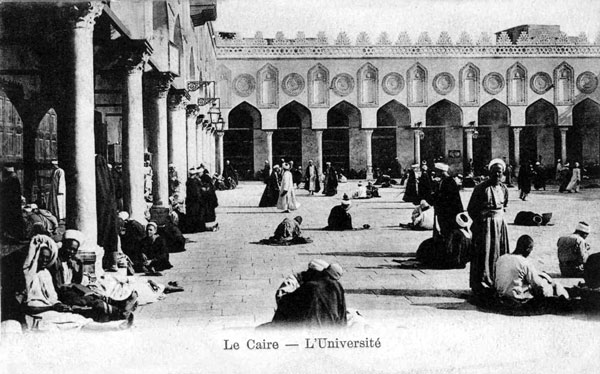
View of the courtyard of the Al-Azhar mosque and its university students, 1910.

The pilgrimage to Mecca, along with visits to other holy sites (ziyarat), was an essential step in the career of Sufi scholars of the Sahara and central Sahel. Hissein and his wife Habiba visited multiple significant Islamic holy sites: they spent a year in Mecca, six months in Medina and two and a half years in Jerusalem at the Al-Aqsa Mosque. During this journey, Hissein continued his training as a Muslim scholar, receiving teaching from prestigious teachers.

In 1904 the couple settled in Cairo, with Hissein enrolling as a student at Al-Azhar University. In a letter to his parents, written in Kanuri Ajami and later published by Prietze, Hissein stated that he was affiliated with the Bornu riwāq, a residential area reserved for students from the central Sahel, though he did not live there. Around this time, Hissein married for a second time, to a woman from the town of Kukawa, former capital of the sultanate of Bornu, whose name is unknown. To fund his studies, he worked as a trader during university holidays, becoming involved in trade between major Mediterranean cities — Jerusalem, Tunis, Tripoli — as well as the trade caravans heading across the Sahara toward the Sahel.

In 1904 he met the German philologist and linguist Rudolf Prietze, who had come to the al-Azhar mosque to find native Hausa and Kanuri speakers to interview. Hissein offered to help Prietze, marking the start of a ten-year collaboration between the two men.

=== Partnership with Rudolf Prietze ===
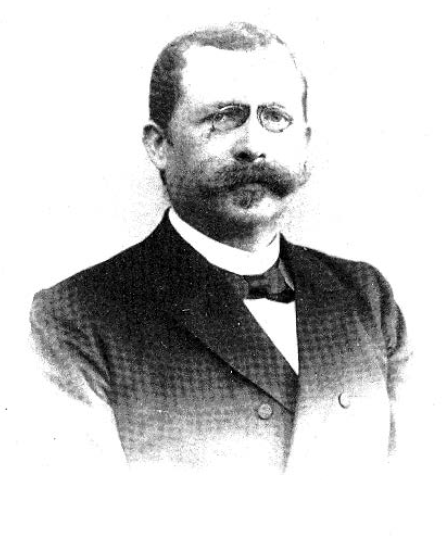
Rudolf Prietze, German philologist and linguist.

The intellectual partnership between Hissein and Rudolf Prietze, formed in Cairo in 1904, resulted in a significant co-production of knowledge, although historically Prietze alone received credit for this work. The nature of their collaboration is detailed in Prietze's introductions and footnotes, as well as in letters he sent to his parents and his personal notebooks, now conserved at the University of Hamburg library.

The two men worked together on a daily basis, conversing mainly in Hausa. During their ten-year collaboration, Hissein recounted songs, proverbs, fables and historical stories in both Hausa and Kanuri to Prietze, who published these within academic articles in the 1920s and 1930s. Hissein's second wife – whom the ethnologist Gisela Seidensticker-Brikay has suggested calling Hajjiya Musa — played a central role in the collection of proverbs, as these tend to be memorised and used by women rather than men in the central Sahel.

The partnership revolved around an equal intellectual dialogue: Hissein was a scholar just like Prietze, educated at the foremost universities of Islamic scholarship, with knowledge of Classical Arabic, Kanuri, Hausa and Old Kanembu. The footnotes added by Prietze to his handwritten notes of their exchanges reveal the choices of transcription, grammar and phonology made jointly by the two men.

=== Legacy ===
Hissein's work was that of a philologist trained in multilingual environments, who had mastered the various linguistic codes of Sahelian languages. However, his name was not mentioned as an author or contributor in Prietze's publications, as the German linguist remained heavily influenced by the colonial and racist prejudices of his time. This reflects a broader pattern: multiple publications about Africa produced in Europe during the colonial period relied on the knowledge of African intellectuals who never received credit for their academic contributions.

In 2025 the Nigerien linguist Ari Awagana and the French historian Camille Lefebvre undertook a project to edit, translate and publish the Kanuri corpus communicated to Prietze by Hissein, also using Prietze's personal and professional archives to uncover important information about Hissein and the two men's partnership. Through this research, Awagana and Lefebvre demonstrated that Musa communicated to Prietze his own interpretation of Ajami grammatical and transcription rules – including identifying the difference between the two "r" sounds in Hausa — and suggested certain lexical interpretations of the texts produced by the partnership.

No information about the end of Hissein's life has been discovered; Gordon Lethem recorded only that Hissein was still living in Cairo in 1925.

== List of works ==
=== Kanuri publications ===
- Prietze, Rudolf (1914). "Bornulieder". Mitteilungen des Seminars für Orientalische Sprachen an der Friedrich Wilhelms-Universität zu Berlin (in German and Kanuri). 17: 1–127.
- Prietze, Rudolf (1915). "Bornusprichwörter". Mitteilungen des Seminars für Orientalische Sprachen an der Friedrich Wilhelms-Universität zu Berlin (in German and Kanuri). 18: 1–88.
- Prietze, Rudolf (1930). "Bornu-Texte. Gesammelt und erklärt von Dr. Phil. Rudolf Prietze". Mitteilungen des Seminars für Orientalische Sprachen an der Friedrich Wilhelms-Universität zu Berlin (in German, Kanuri, and Hausa). 33: 82–159.

=== Hausa publications ===
- Prietze, Rudolf (1916). "Lieder fahrender Haussa-Schüler". Mitteilungen des Seminars für Orientalische Sprachen an der Friedrich Wilhelms-Universität zu Berlin (in German and Hausa). 19: 1–115.
- Prietze, Rudolf (1917). "Gesungene Predigten eines fahrenden Haussalehrers". Mitteilungen des Seminars für Orientalische Sprachen an der Friedrich Wilhelms-Universität zu Berlin (in German and Hausa). 20: 1–60.
- Prietze, Rudolf (1917). "Landwirtschaftliche Haussa-Lieder". Festschrift Eduard Hahn zum 60. Geburtstag (in German and Hausa). Stuttgart: Strecker & Schröder. pp. 167–189.
- Prietze, Rudolf (1918). "Haussa-Preislieder auf Parias. Gesammelt und erklärt von Rudolf Prietze". Mitteilungen des Seminars für Orientalische Sprachen an der Friedrich Wilhelms-Universität zu Berlin (in German and Hausa). 21: 1–53.
- Prietze, Rudolf (1927). "Lieder des Haussavolkes". Mitteilungen des Seminars für Orientalische Sprachen an der Friedrich-Wilhelms-Universität zu Berlin (in German and Hausa). 30: 5–172.

== Bibliography ==
- Awagana, Ari; Lefebvre, Camille (2025). L'œuvre en kanouri d'al-Hajj Musa ibn Hissein, un savant du Borno (Niger-Nigéria). Leiden/Boston: Brill. ISBN 978-90-04-72403-7.
- Brenner, Louis (2001). Controlling Knowledge: Religion, Power and Schooling in a West African Muslim Society. Bloomington/Indianapolis: Indiana University Press.
- Chanfi, Ahmed (2015). West African "Ulama" and Salafism in Mecca and Medina: Jawab al-Ifriqi, The Response of the African. Leiden/Boston: Brill.
- Laminu, Hamatsu Zanna (1993). Scholars and Scholarship in the History of Borno. Zaria: The Open Press.
- Lefebvre, Camille (2021). Des pays au crépuscule. Le moment de l'occupation coloniale (Sahara-Sahel). Paris: Fayard.
- Mudimbe, Valentin (1988). The Invention of Africa: Gnosis, Philosophy and the Order of Knowledge. Bloomington: Indiana University Press.
- Omer El-Nagar (1969). West Africa and the Muslim pilgrimage: An historical study with special reference to the nineteenth century. Doctorate Thesis, London: SOAS University.
- Prietze, Rudolf (1930). "Bornu-Texte. Gesammelt und erklärt von Dr. Phil. Rudolf Prietze". Mitteilungen des Seminars für Orientalische Sprachen an der Königlichen Friedrich-Wilhelms-Universität zu Berlin. 33: 82–159.
- Seidensticker-Brikay, Gisela (2013). "Prietze's Research Associates". In Umaru Ahmed, The Hausa World of Rudolf Prietze. Zaria: Ahmadu Bello University Press. pp. 813–824.
