= Kanembu =

Kanembu may refer to:

- Kanembu people
- Kanembu language
- Tumari Kanuri, another language known as Kanembu
