= Bilma Kanuri =

Variety of the Kanuri language

- Native to: Niger
- Region: Agadez
- Ethnicity: Kanuri
- Native speakers: 48,000 (2024)
- Language family: Nilo-Saharan?: Saharan; Western; Kanuri; Bilma Kanuri
- Dialects: Bilma; Fachi
- Writing system: Latin

Language codes
- ISO 639-3: bms
- Glottolog: bilm1238

Bilma Kanuri is a variety of the Kanuri language which is a Nilo-Saharan language belonging to the Saharan branch of the language family. It is spoken in Niger mainly in the Agadez Region by the Bilma Kanuri subgroup, and is named after the town of Bilma. The variety is one of the smaller varieties of Kanuri in terms of the number of speakers.

Like other varieties of Kanuri, Bilma Kanuri is agglutinative, where affixes are added to a root word to convey grammatical relationships and meanings. It typically follows a Subject-Object-Verb word order in basic sentence structures. Bilma Kanuri also exhibits vowel harmony, where vowels within a word harmonize or share certain phonetic features.
