= Soborom Hot Springs =

Geothermal feature in the Tibesti Mountains of Chad

Soborom
- Location within Chad

Highest point
- Elevation: 2,400 m (7,900 ft)
- Coordinates: 20°56′N 17°11′E

Naming
- Etymology: Name of a hot spring in the field
- Native name: Soborom (Tedaga)
- English translation: Boiling water

Soborom is a group of hot springs with accompanying fumaroles and mud volcanoes in the Tibesti Mountains of Chad. Three dispersed groups of vents are active there, some of which are used as spas by the local population.

== Name and use ==
The name Soborom means boiling water in Tedaga; it refers to the hottest spring and has been applied to the entire field. Kidissubi means dog fighting a mouflon. The springs are sometimes named Yerike, and other times Soborom is translated as healing waters. Reportedly, the local people use the springs as a spa, but the political situation makes access to the area difficult.

== Geography and springs ==
Soborom lies in the Tibesti Mountains of the Sahara. The Soborom is a depression carved by erosion 1 kilometre (0.62 mi) (or 5 kilometres (3.1 mi)) west of the Tarso Voon caldera and is surrounded by various mountains such as the 2,685-metre-high (8,809 ft) Ehi Duduri, the 2,615-metre-high (8,579 ft) Ehi Tadare, and the 2,600-metre-high (8,500 ft) Ehi Guma; the Ehi Duduri is already part of the Tarso Voon caldera rim. The Soborom depression and a similar structure at Souradom farther south are both volcano-tectonic domes which now form depressions; geothermal processes are only known from Soborom, however.

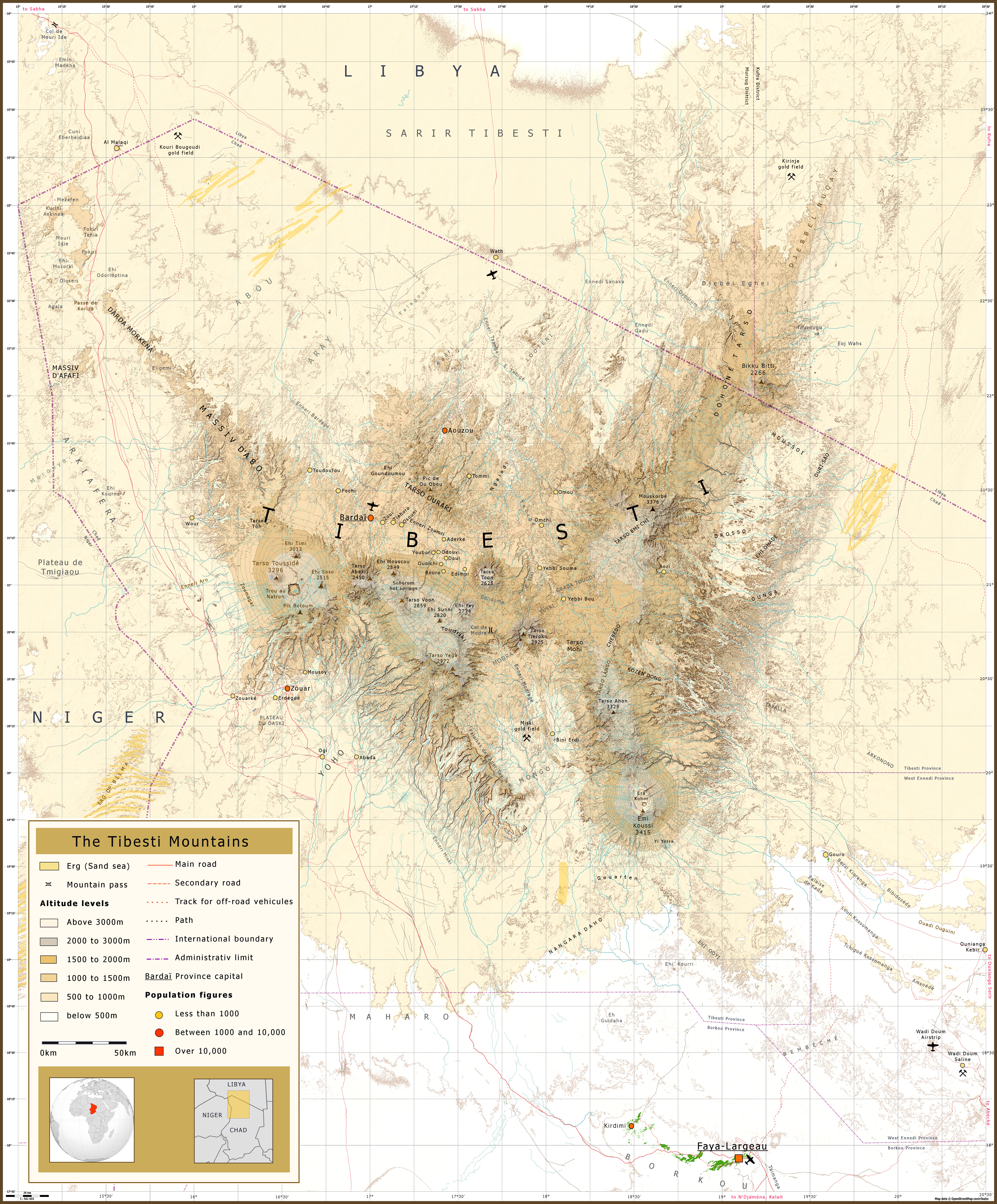
Topographic map of the Tibesti mountains with Soborom Hot Springs near Tarso Voon

Thermal activity is focused in three areas: an isolated northern one 600 metres (2,000 ft) north of the others, a central one, and a southern one. There, between 2,400–2,510 metres (7,870–8,230 ft) elevation, lie clusters of exhalations, fumaroles, hot springs, mud volcanoes, solfataras, and reportedly a geyser as well. In some places, the ground is hot enough that standing there is uncomfortable.

The temperatures of the vents range between 30–80 °C (86–176 °F), and hydrogen sulfide exhalations give them a rotten egg smell; their waters are acidic, probably due to the presence of sulfuric acid. The springs produce small quantities of water—averaged over the entire field only a few liters per minute—that is quite muddy due to the high content of particles. This water forms mud bubbles that, when bursting can throw fragments several tens of centimeters away; they form the 1–2-metre (3 ft 3 in – 6 ft 7 in) high mud volcanoes.

The central and southern areas are located on dry valleys. Within the depression, various drainages converge into the southwestward flowing Enneri Soborom-Souradom, which has incised the hot spring deposits and is itself the site of the western area. A waterfall lies in the area, and there are two noticeable river terraces as well which feature thermal activity.

The activity has eroded the country rocks and left deposits, including sulfur, geyserites, sulfates, and chlorides, which are generated by the deposition of the gasses and chemical reactions between the gasses and the air. The sulfur often forms flower-like structures at the gas vents. The exhalations are extremely corrosive, consuming tinplate within a few weeks and turning the rock into a porridge-like substance.

=== Individual vents ===
The individual areas feature the following structures:

- A mud volcano Soborom Kidissubi dominates the northern area and is 2–3 metres (6 ft 7 in – 9 ft 10 in) high and 6–7 metres (20–23 ft) wide. Sometimes very intense exhalations are found dispersed over this area and in a gully.
- The central area features seven bubbling hot springs as well as mud volcanoes and fumarolic exhalations. It contains the hottest spring, Soborom. "Dead" mud volcanoes can also be found here.
- The western area lies on the terraces of a dry valley and within the dry valley itself and is the least active. It features two hot springs and some fumaroles with little activity, plus remnants of a mud volcano. The Toubou people use the western area's "Toubou-bath" as a bath.

Now-inactive springs, fumaroles, and geysers have covered parts of the area with 10–20-metre (33–66 ft) thick geyserite deposits, which bear traces of the former vents. The inactive area is bordered by dry valleys on the north and the south, while the central and southern active areas are located directly north and west, respectively.

== Geology ==
The Tibesti Mountains formed through an interplay of tectonic phenomena and volcanism, with the central high sector of the mountains formed by Cenozoic volcanism, while the lower parts were formed during Precambrian to Cenozoic age. The volcanic activity covered an area of about 14,000 square kilometres (5,400 sq mi) and took various forms, including deep craters, large calderas, shield volcanoes, and stratovolcanoes. At Soborom, these volcanics crop out in various series known as the Middle Dark Series, Middle Bright Series, and Upper Dark Series.
