= Daza language =

Saharan language of eastern Niger and northern Chad

Daza
- Dazaga
- Native to: Chad and Niger
- Region: BET Region, Bahr el Gazel Region, Batha, Borkou, Hadjer-Lamis, Kanem, Lac, Wadi-Fira, Diffa, Zinder
- Ethnicity: Toubou
- Native speakers: 700,000 (2019–2021)
- Language family: Nilo-Saharan?: Saharan; Western; Tebu; Daza
- Writing system: Latin

Language codes
- ISO 639-3: dzg
- Glottolog: daza1242
- Linguasphere: 02-BAA-ab

Daza (also known as Dazaga) is a Nilo-Saharan language spoken by the Daza people (a sub-group of the Toubou people inhabiting northern Chad and eastern Niger). The Daza are also known as the Gouran (Gorane) in Chad. Dazaga is spoken by around 700,000 people, primarily in the Djurab Desert region and the Borkou region, locally called Haya or Faya-Largeau northern-central Chad, in Kanem there is a lot of Daza around 300,000, the capital of the Dazaga people. Dazaga is spoken in the Tibesti Mountains of Chad (606,000 speakers), in eastern Niger near N'guigmi and to the north (93,200 speakers). It is also spoken to a smaller extent in Libya and in Sudan, where there is a community of 3,000 speakers in the city of Omdurman. There is also a small diaspora community working in Jeddah, Saudi Arabia.

The two primary dialects of the Dazaga language are Daza and Kara, but there are several other mutually intelligible dialects, including Kaga, Kanobo, Taruge and Azza. It is closely related to the Tedaga language, spoken by the Teda, the other out of the two Toubou people groups, who reside primarily in the Tibesti Mountains of northern Chad and in southern Libya near the city of Sabha.

Dazaga is a Nilo-Saharan language and a member of the Western Saharan branch of the Saharan subgroup which also contains the Kanuri language, Kanembu language and Tebu languages. Tebu is further divided into Tedaga and Dazaga. The Eastern Saharan branch includes the Zaghawa language and Berti language.

== Vocabulary ==
The dialects spoken in Chad and Niger have some French influence whereas the dialects spoken in Libya and Sudan have more of an Arabic influence. The Dazaga language was not traditionally a written language but in recent years the SIL had developed an orthography. The majority of Dazaga speakers are bilingual or multilingual in their native tongue along with either Arabic, French, Zaghawa, Hausa, Zarma, Kanuri or Tuareg. There are thus many borrowings from other languages such as Arabic, Hausa or French. For example, the word for "thank you" is borrowed from Arabic shokran and incorporated into the language by usually being followed by the suffix -num marking the second person.

The following tables contain words from the Daza dialect spoken in Omdurman, Sudan. This romanisation is not standard.

=== Numbers ===
English	Dazaga	English	Dazaga
One	Tron	Eleven	Murdai sa Tron
Two	Jow	Twelve	Murdai sa Jow
Three	Aguzo	Thirteen	Murdai sa Aguzo
Four	Twzo	Fourteen	Murdai sa Twzo
Five	Foo	Fifteen	Murdai sa Foo
Six	Disi	Sixteen	Murdai sa Disi
Seven	Troso	Seventeen	Murdai sa Troso
Eight	Woso	Eighteen	Murdai sa Woso
Nine	Yisi	Nineteen	Murdai sa Yisi
Ten	Murdum	Twenty	Digiram
Thirty	Murtta Aguzo	Fifty	Murtta Foo
Forty	Murtta Twzo	Hundred	Kidri

=== Basic words and phrases ===
English	Dazaga	English	Dazaga
man	Ay	Good Morning	Wasa Nisira
person	Aou	Aoubo	Big person
woman	Ari	Good Night	Kalar Sizoo
family	Ama tanga	Thank you	alay barkantchân
brother	Dahigi	My name is...	Tan Sortanjo
sister	Duroo	What is your name?	Sornuma Jaa? or sornuma eni'
papa	Abaa	How are you?	neré wasi?
mama	Aya	I am well	Kala Layy or Tan Wasu or wasa a'
friend	sardou	Please	toussowna
world	Dina	Country	Ni
dead	Noso	Religion	Din
Kano	down or low	Better	Bouré
East	Mah	West	Je, Ji, Jeh or Jih
North	Yala	South	Anu, Enu or Aonu are all correct, depending on one's pronunciation.
from east	Mar	from west	Jer or Jir
from north	Yalar	from south	Anur, Enur or Aonur
land	Tu or To	big	bo, bu or bou are all correct
Green	Zer	Tozer	Green Land
Chief	Bougoudi	much / very	Bodo, Budu or Boudou
Darda	Sultan	Kadala	Sultan
people	amma / ama	Maïna	Noble

The Azza are a blacksmith class who speak their own dialect of the language, referred to as Azzanga, which is considered by Dagaza speakers to be lower in status then the standard dialect.

== Phonology ==
The phonology of Daza is as follows:

=== Consonants ===
	Labial	Alveolar	Palatal	Velar	Glottal
Plosive	b	t d	tʃ dʒ	k ɡ	
Fricative	f	s z	(ʃ)		h
Nasal	m	n	ɲ	ŋ	
Flap		ɾ			
Lateral		l			
Approximant	w		j		

=== Vowels ===
	Front	Central	Back
Close	i		u
Close	ɪ		ʊ
Mid	e		o
Mid	ɛ		ɔ
Open		a	

=== Tone ===
Dagaza showcases 4 distinct tones, high, low, rising, and falling, although the occurrence of rising and falling tones is limited to just a few specific contexts and no word exists which only contains low tones. For this reason, there is debate as to whether these truly represent 4 distinct tonemes or if instead Dagaza has a pitch accent system.

== Grammar ==
The Daza language exhibits a subject-object-verb word order, as can be seen in the following example:

à̰ʊ̰́ áɪ̀ dɪ́lɪ̀mɪ̀ [káá] [sʊ́nà] ɡɔ́ɾʊ̀
à̰ʊ̰́ áɪ̀ dɪ́lɪ̀m=ɪ̀ kɛ́ɛ́-a sʊ́n-à Ø-j-kɔ́ɾ
man this leprosy=ERG hand-PL 3S.POSS-PL 3.OBJ-3-cut
‘This man, leprosy cut his hands.’

There are no grammatical genders in Dagaza, and biological gender is indicated with separate lexical items for male and female.

Adding the adjectivalizer suffix -ɾ́ɛ at the end of a word forms adjectives from nouns, verbs, and occasionally even other adjectives.

Verbs are inflected for both subject and object arguments. This inflection is sensitive to grammatical person, but not number, gender, or other features of the subject and object.

To signify presentational possession (exemplified by the have verb in English, e.g. "I have a computer"), Dazaga utilizes a transitive "have-verb" strategy where the possessor is the subject and the possessum is the object, similar to how this construction is made in English. The following example shows presentational possession in Dazaga:

jɛ́ɡɛ̀ ɡòdúù déì
jɛ́ɡɛ̀ ɡòdú=ù Ø-j-téi
house clay=GEN.SG 3.OBJ-3-have
'He has a house of clay.’

Dazaga uses clitic case markers for four cases: ergative, accusative, genitive, and dative. The marking of case is sensitive to an Animacy Hierarchy: the accusative enclitic /=ɡà/ encodes the object of a transitive verb when it is a high animacy referent (personal pronouns). For all other object referents, this clitic is optional.

Interrogatives are indicated in two ways; yes/no questions are formed by attaching the clitic -ra to the end of the verb, information questions are indicated by the presence by equivalents to wh- question words in English at the end of the phrase.
