= Tarjumo language =

Classical and liturgical language of central Sahel

Old Kanembu
- Tarjumo
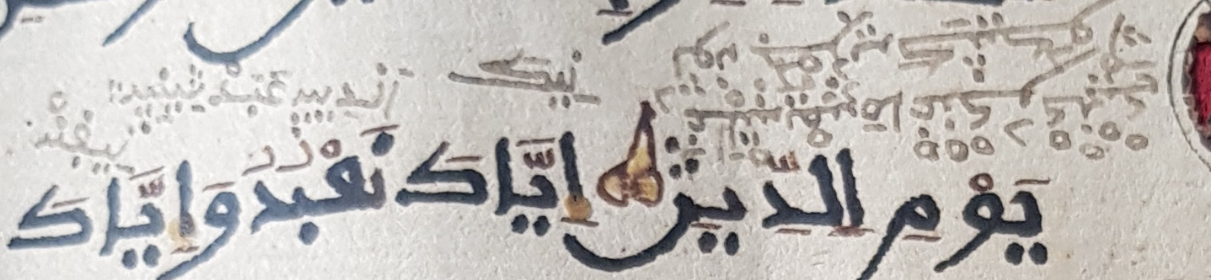
- = Interlinear inscriptions in Old Kanembu
- Native to: Nigeria, Niger
- Region: Northern Nigeria, Southeastern Niger
- Extinct: liturgical use only
- Language family: Nilo-Saharan: Saharan; Kanuri; Old Kanembu
- Writing system: Ajami script

Language codes
- ISO 639-3: txj
- Glottolog: tarj1235

Tarjumo, also known as Old Kanembu or Classical Kanembu, is a classical and sacred language created and used by Muslim scholars in the Kanem–Bornu Empire, located in the central Sahel. It likely emerged in the 15th century as a liturgical and scholarly language for Qur'anic exegesis and grammatical analysis of sacred texts in classical arabic. The name Tarjumo derives from the Arabic verb tarjama (ترجم), meaning "to translate."

It is classified within the Nilo-Saharan language family, although this classification is debated among linguists. Old Kanembu is an early form of the Kanuri language, which became fixed through its liturgical use before the dialectal split that led to the emergence of Kanembu, spoken in the northeast of Lake Chad in present-day Chad. As a result, it retains linguistic features shared with the Teda-Daza and Beria languages. The Tarjumo language uses the Arabic script, and represents a complementary practice to Ajami in vernacular languages. Scholars primarily used it for grammatical analysis and the Qur’anic exegesis of sacred texts in Classical Arabic. Today, Tarjumo is still used in glossing and Qur'anic exegesis (Tafsir) by a limited circle of Muslim scholars in Borno State, Nigeria, as well as in southeastern Niger, particularly in Zinder and Kribitoa, in the Diffa Region.

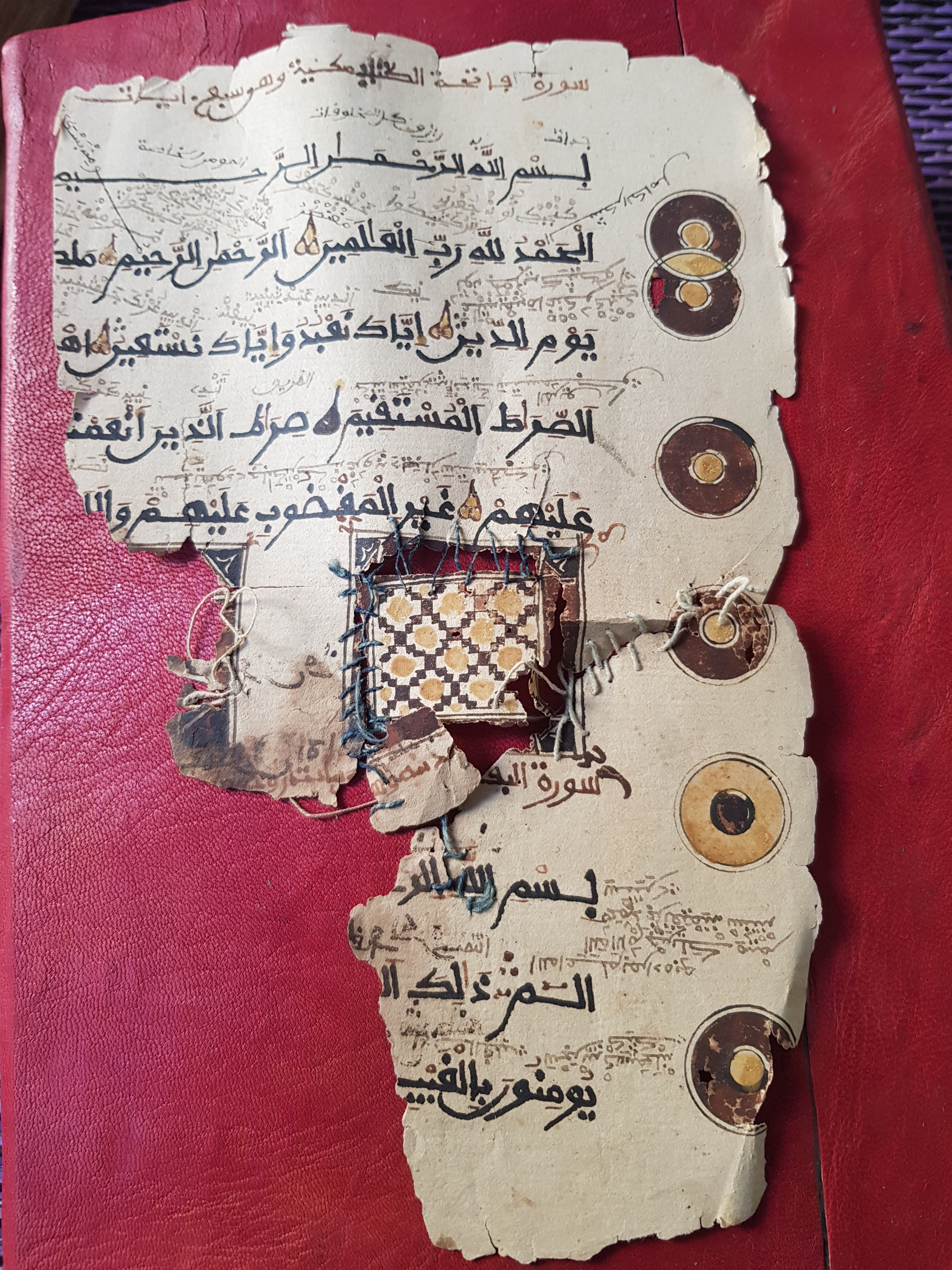
Manuscript fragment of a Qur'an with annotations in Old Kanembu, displaying interlinear and marginal commentary. The manuscript belongs to the Chétima family archives in Zinder. Photograph by Ari Awagana, ERC Langarchiv project.

== History ==
=== Emergence (12th–15th Centuries) ===
The Tarjumo language is a part of the African literacy associated with Islamic scholarship in the Sahara-Sahel region, referred to as the "African Library" by Ousmane Omar Kane. Kanem was one of the earliest regions in the Sahara and Sahel to embrace Islam, with evidence of Islamic scholarly culture dating back to the 12th century during the reign of the Sayfawa dynasty. In the 13th century, the writings of the Kanem poet and scholar al-Kanemi were noted by the Arab biographer Ibn Khallikan. Islamic scholars and experts in Quranic sciences received financial support from the Kanem court, along with numerous privileges granted through charters known as mahrams.

=== Written tradition in Old Kanembu ===
Map showing the extent of the Kanem–Bornu Empire's territories in the 18th century

It is within this favorable context for the production and transmission of Islamic scholarly knowledge that the practice of Quranic glossing in what is now referred to as Old Kanembu is believed to have emerged. The oldest known Old Kanembu manuscripts, such as the Geidam Quran, date back to the 17th century, they attest to an exegetical tradition that predates them.

In the 16th century, when the Sayfawa dynasty moved from Kanem to Bornu, southeast of Lake Chad, these scholarly practices spread to the new regions. In the 18th century, the Bornu Sultanate played a central role in trans-Saharan trade between Kano and Tripoli, utilizing the route through Bilma, the Kaouar oases, and Fezzan. Kanuri served as the lingua franca along this route, while written culture in Arabic, Kanuri Ajami, and Old Kanembu flourished.

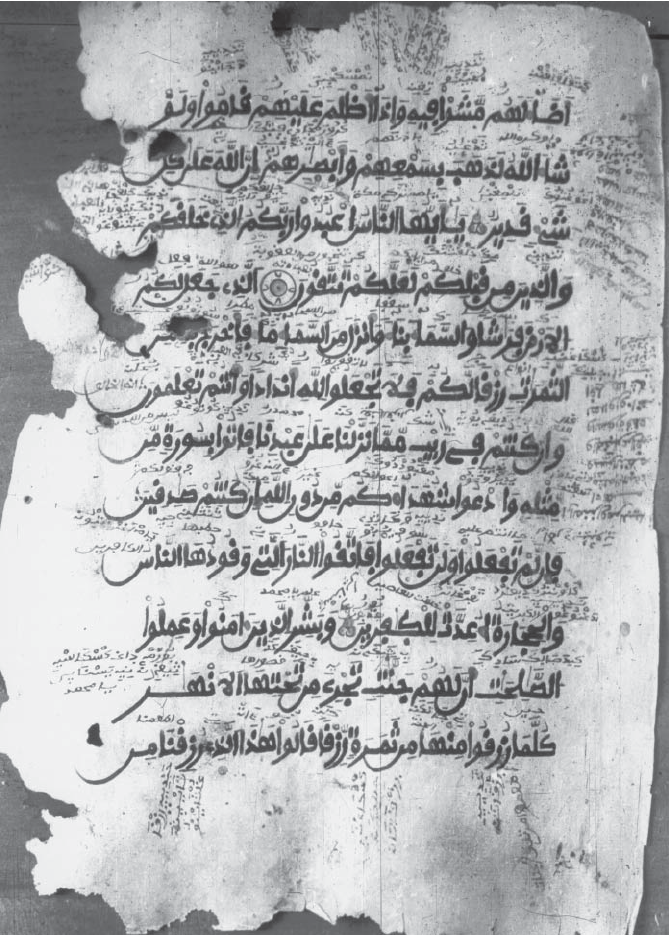
Photograph by A.D.H. Bivar (late 1950s) showing a page of the 'Geidam Quran' (manuscript 1YM). This fourth page contains verses 20 to 25 of Surah Al-Baqara, annotated with interlinear commentary in Old Kanembu.

=== Marginalization ===
At the turn of the 20th century, part of the intellectual elite of Bornu went into exile, including figures such as Al-Hajj Musa ibn Hissein, following the conquest of the Bornu Sultanate by the warlord Rabih, and subsequent colonial occupations by the French, British, and Germans in the region. Colonial rule led to the marginalization in Western scholarship of West African Arabic and Ajami literary cultures. However, Ajami manuscripts from the Central Sahara-Sahel were already known to certain Anglican missionaries of the Church Missionary Society by the late 19th century.

These scholarly and literary traditions from the Sahel and Central Sahara were rediscovered in the late 1950s and 1960s by British academics based in Nigeria, such as W.E.N. Kensdale and John Hunwick from the University of Ibadan, and A.D.H. Bivar from the Department of Antiquities in Jos. In 1959, Bivar, identified ancient Quran manuscripts—including one dated to 1st Jumādā 1080 AH (26 October 1669)—annotated in Arabic and a previously unknown second language. In the 2000s, Dimitry Bondarev analyzed and identified this language, naming it Old Kanembu.

== Old Kanembu as a scriptural language ==
=== Glossing ===
The scholarly communities of Bornu employ Old Kanembu as a specialized medium for the interpretation and transmission of Qur'anic knowledge. Annotations and commentaries in Old Kanembu adhered to a codified system. The stability of the practice is evidenced by manuscripts that were annotated successively by multiple scribes. The manuscripts are in loose-leaf format, with catchwords written on the verso to maintain the correct order of folios. The leaves are typically bundled using protective boards, a leather folder, or a custom-made satchel.

Depending on the manuscript, annotations appear directly alongside the main text, interlinearly for grammatical or semantic clarification, or in the margins, according to the type of analysis required. These glosses are frequently accompanied by quotations from Classical Arabic exegetical sources. By combining translation, commentary, and Qur'anic interpretation, the glosses in Old Kanembu illustrate how linguistic code-switching influences the understanding of sacred texts.

=== Practices blending oral and written traditions ===
One of the distinctive features of scholarly practices and education in the Saharo-Sahelian regions is the interplay between the written Arabic of the sacred text and the African vernacular languages. This blending of modes reflects a continuum between written and oral traditions characteristic of Sahelian cultures. Passages of the Qur'an are first recited aloud in Arabic and then orally translated by the scholar into vernacular languages. It is within this intellectual context that Old Kanembu exegetical practices take place, closely tied to oral interpretative performance.

During these performances, the Qur'an is recited from memory by scholars, typically beginning with the shorter final sūrahs. Each passage is divided into units of meaning and analyzed with reference to classical exegetical texts (tafsīr), such as the Tafsīr al-Jalālayn compiled by Jalāl ad-Dīn al-Suyūṭī in 1505. These commentaries, generally read from written sources, inform the translation and interpretation of each unit of meaning into Tarjumo. The scholar adapts the format of their recitation to the audience, either condensing or elaborating the commentary depending on the context. In more informal settings, where audience comprehension is essential, recitations are often interspersed with commentary in vernacular Kanuri.

=== Contemporary uses within Bornu Muslim communities ===
Old Kanembu continues to be used today in the Nigerian state of Borno, particularly in its capital, Maiduguri, as well as in neighbouring regions of southeastern Niger such as Damagaram, Manga, and Damergou. In these areas, a modernized form of the language is sometimes referred to as Tarjumo-Kanembu. It remains highly valued within the Kanuri-speaking community for its religious and cultural significance. Mastery of Old Kanembu is considered prestigious and constitutes a central component of advanced classical Islamic education (sangaya). It is publicly employed during Qur'anic exegesis performances (tarjumo) at significant events such as Arabic poetry competitions (qasīda), invocations, and recitations held throughout the month of Ramadan.

== Linguistic features ==
=== Phonology ===
The phonology of Old Kanembu is closely linked to the transcriptional possibilities offered by the Ajami alphabet. In particular, tonal distinctions are indicated through the contrast between short and long vowels.

The phonological characteristics of Old Kanembu evolved over the four centuries documented by existing manuscripts. These phonological shifts are reflected in orthographic variations within Ajami writing, reflecting developments in vernacular languages. For instance, the letter ش (shīn), previously reserved for borrowings from Classical Arabic, was later repurposed to represent palatalized consonants in modern Kanuri, as in /shîm/ ‘eyes’.

Moreover, several specific graphemes were employed to represent phonemes unique to spoken Kanuri.

=== Grammar ===
Old Kanembu possesses an especially rich verbal system, characterized by fifteen categories of inflection and four categories of derivation. A central feature of the language is its system of focus, which can be either rhematic (absolute), emphasizing new information, or thematic (relative), referencing contextually known information. This focusing mechanism likely originates from Chadic languages, notably Hausa, which possesses analogous focus structures.
