= Kanuri =

Kanuri may refer to:

- Kanuri people
- Kanuri language
