= Saharan =

Saharan may refer to:

- Someone or something from the Sahara desert
- Sahrawi people (also spelled Saharawi), the indigenous people of Western Sahara
- Saharan languages, a subgroup of the Nilo-Saharan languages
