= Tumari Kanuri =

Variety of the Kanuri language

- Native to: Niger
- Region: Diffa
- Ethnicity: Kanuri
- Native speakers: 115,000 (2024)
- Language family: Nilo-Saharan?: Saharan; Western; Kanuri; Tumari Kanuri
- Dialects: Kubari; Tumari; Suwurti
- Writing system: Latin

Language codes
- ISO 639-3: krt
- Glottolog: tuma1248

Tumari Kanuri, also known as Kanembu in Niger (though different from Kanembu of Chad), is a variety of the Kanuri language, a Nilo-Saharan language of the Saharan branch. It is spoken in Niger by approximately 115,000 speakers in the Diffa Region of southeast Niger, near the border with Chad and Nigeria. Tumari Kanuri is closely related to the Movar dialect of Yerwa Kanuri.

Tumari Kanuri exhibits subject-object-verb (SOV) word order, where the subject typically precedes the verb, followed by the object. Phonologically, Tumari Kanuri is characterized by a rich system of consonants and vowels, including a distinction between short and long vowels. The morphology of Tumari Kanuri involves a complex system of noun and verb inflections, with various prefixes and suffixes marking grammatical features such as case, gender, and number. Postpositions play a significant role in indicating spatial relationships, and adjectives typically follow the noun they modify. Pronouns in Tumari Kanuri show distinctions in person, gender, and number, reflecting the language's intricate system of nominal and verbal agreement. Verbs are a central element of Tumari Kanuri grammar, featuring a variety of conjugations and aspectual distinctions. The language belongs to the typological category of agglutinative languages, characterized by the formation of words through the addition of affixes to a root.
