= Central Kanuri =

Dialect of the Kanuri language

- Yerwá Kànùrí
- Native to: Nigeria, Niger, Chad, Cameroon
- Region: Lake Chad
- Ethnicity: Kanuri (Yerwa Kanuri)
- Speakers: L1: 9.27 million (2019–2024); L2: 500,000
- Language family: Nilo-Saharan?: Saharan; Western; Kanuri; Central Kanuri
- Dialects: Kagama; Lare; Kwayam; Njesko; Kuvuri; Ngazar; Guvja; Mao; Temageri; Fadawa; Yerwa; Maiduguri
- Writing system: Latin; Arabic (Ajami)

Language codes
- ISO 639-3: knc
- Glottolog: cent2050

Central Kanuri or Yerwa Kanuri, is a variety of the Kanuri language spoken mainly in adjacent parts of Nigeria, Niger, Cameroon, and Chad, as well as by a diaspora community residing in Sudan. It is spoken by the Yerwa Kanuri, who are the largest subgroup of Kanuri people in West and Central Africa. Yerwa Kanuri is the largest of the Kanuri varieties. It is also used for both oral and written communication in Cameroon and is classified within the Saharan branch of the Nilo-Saharan language family. The Yerwa Kanuri variety of the Kanuri language in Nigeria is written using the Ajami script of the Arabic alphabet.

== Geographic distribution ==
Yerwa Kanuri is a Language of Wider Communication (LWC) and de facto language of provincial identity in Borno, Yobe, and Gombe states of Nigeria. It is used in education and is widespread generally. The Kanuri language, serving as the de facto language of provincial identity in Borno, Yobe, and Gombe states, is used in education and widely spoken in those regions.

Originating from the central-south Sahara area, the Kanuri people expanded around Lake Chad in the late 7th century. They are the dominant ethnic group in Borno State, and their language became prevalent in the mid-19th century. It is used in trade, daily life, religion and literature in those states but also across Central Africa.

== Linguistics ==
=== Morphology ===
In terms of morphology, it exhibits a system of affixation, incorporating prefixes, suffixes and infixes to convey various grammatical and semantic nuances. Phonologically, Central Kanuri is characterized by a diverse set of consonants and vowels, including nasalized vowels. The language has tonal distinctions, which contribute to lexical and grammatical meaning.

=== Grammar ===
Grammatically, Central Kanuri follows a subject-object-verb (SOV) word order, with the subject typically preceding and the object following the verb. The language features a variety of grammatical features such as gender agreement; noun classes; and a complex system of verbal inflections to mark tense, aspect, and mood. Noun classes play a crucial role in Central Kanuri and influence concord with adjectives, pronouns, and verbs.

Postpositions in Central Kanuri are used to express relationships between entities and are essential for indicating spatial and temporal relationships. Verbs are highly inflected, reflecting various grammatical categories and providing a nuanced understanding of actions and events. The language incorporates a system of verbal derivation to create new words and convey shades of meaning.

=== Dialects ===
Yerwa Kanuri is named after the central dialect of Yerwa, which is spoken in mainly in Nigeria. The language has several dialects, only some of which are mutually intelligible to other speakers of Central Kanuri. The Kwayam dialect is not understood by speakers of other dialects, and the Maiduguri dialect, named after the town of Maiduguri, is mutually intelligible with other dialects of Yerwa Kanuri.
