= Tebu languages =

Saharan language family

Tebu
- Tubu
- Geographic distribution: Chad, Libya, Niger
- Ethnicity: Toubou people
- Linguistic classification: Nilo-Saharan?: Saharan; Western Saharan; Tebu
- Subdivisions: Teda; Daza

Language codes
- Glottolog: tebu1238

Tebu is a small family of two Saharan languages, consisting of Daza and Teda. It is spoken by the two groups of Toubou people, the Daza and Teda.

Tebu is predominantly spoken in Chad and in southern Libya by around 580,000 people. Daza and Teda have an estimated 537,000 and 42,500 speakers, respectively.
