= Manga Kanuri =

Variety of the Kanuri language

- Native to: Nigeria, Niger
- Region: Lake Chad
- Ethnicity: Kanuri
- Native speakers: 1.2 million (2024)
- Language family: Nilo-Saharan?: Saharan; Western; Kanuri; Manga Kanuri
- Dialects: Dagara; Manga
- Writing system: Latin; Arabic (Ajami)

Language codes
- ISO 639-3: kby
- Glottolog: mang1399

Manga Kanuri is a variety of the Kanuri language a Nilo-Saharan language of the Saharan branch. Manga Kanuri is spoken mainly in Niger in the regions of Zinder and Diffa along the Nigerian and Chadian borders. It also spoken by a significant number of speakers in Nigeria. Manga Kanuri is the second largest variety of the Kanuri language and is used as a trade language in Niger. It has two main dialects, Manga, and Dagara.

It exhibits a subject-object-verb (SOV) word order. Semantically, Manga Kanuri employs a system of noun class distinctions, influencing both nominal and verbal morphology. Phonologically, the language includes a diverse set of consonants and vowels, with tones playing a crucial role in distinguishing lexical meanings. Morphologically, it features agglutinative elements, where affixes are added to a root to convey various grammatical nuances. Word formation often involves the use of prefixes, suffixes, and infixes.

Manga Kanuri's morphology is notably complex, incorporating intricate verbal inflections that convey tense, aspect, mood, and subject concord. The language employs postpositions to indicate spatial and temporal relationships, offering a distinct set of locative markers. Adjectives in Manga Kanuri usually follow the noun they modify, contributing to the language's syntactic structure. Additionally, the use of classifiers is prevalent, enhancing precision in describing nouns within specific semantic categories.
