= Kanembu language =

Nilo-Saharan language of Chad

Kanembu
- Kanembou
- كَنٜݦُ
- Native to: Chad
- Region: Barh el Gazel, Hadjer-Lamis
- Ethnicity: Kanembu
- Native speakers: 880,000 (2019)
- Language family: Nilo-Saharan?: Saharan; Western; Kanuri; Kanembu
- Early form: Old Kanembu
- Dialects: Karkawu; Mando; Nguri
- Writing system: Latin; Ajami

Language codes
- ISO 639-2: kbl
- ISO 639-3: Either: kbl – Kanembu txj – Old Kanembu
- Glottolog: kane1243
- Linguasphere: 02-AAA-b

Kanembu is a Nilo-Saharan language spoken in Chad by the Kanembu people. It is also spoken by a smaller number of people in Niger. It is closely related to Kanuri.

== Phonology ==
=== Consonants ===
		Labial	Alveolar	Palatal	Velar	Glottal
Nasal		m	n	ɲ	ŋ	
Plosive	voiceless	p	t	c	k	ʔ
Plosive	voiced	b	d	ɟ	ɡ	
Plosive	prenasal	ᵐb	ⁿd	ᶮɟ	ᵑɡ	
Fricative		f	s	ʃ		h
Trill			r			
Approximant		w	l	j		

- /f, b/ can also have allophones of [ɸ, β].

=== Vowels ===
	Front	Central	Back
Close	i		u
Near-close	ɪ		ʊ
Close-mid	e	ə	o
Open-mid	ɛ	ɜ	ɔ
Open		a	

- Vowel length is also distributed.

== Writing system ==
Kanembu is written with the Latin script and Ajami alphabets.

In 2009, the Chadian government standardized both Latin and Ajami scripts for all indigenous languages of the country, including Kanembu, in what is known as Chadian National Alphabet.

Kanembu Latin alphabet
A a	B b	C c	D d	E e	Ə ə	F f	G g	H h	I i	J j	K k
[a]	[b]	[t͡ʃ]	[d]	[e]	[ə]	[f]	[g]	[h]	[i]	[d͡ʒ]	[k]
L l	M m	N n	O o	Pp	R r	S s	T t	U u	W w	Y y	
[l]	[m]	[n]	[o]	[p]	[r]	[s]	[t]	[u]	[w]	[j]	

The letters ⟨â, ê, î, ô, û⟩ are also used. The orthography also uses the digraphs ⟨ch, mb, nd, ng, nj⟩.

The Ajami script has been used for Kanembu, since the time of Dunama Dabbalemi, and still today in the Tarjumo language or in religious works.

Kanembu Arabic alphabet
Arabic (Latin) [IPA]	أ إ ‌( - ) [∅]/[ʔ]	ب (B b) [b]	ت (T t) [t]	ث (S s) [s]	ج (J j) [ɟ]	ڃ (Nj nj) [ᶮɟ]
Arabic (Latin) [IPA]	چ (C c) [t͡ʃ]	ح (H h) [h]	خ (Kh kh) [x]	د (D d) [d]	ڊ (Nd nd) [ⁿd]	ذ (S s) [s]
Arabic (Latin) [IPA]	ر (R r) [r]	ز (S s) [s]	س (S s) [s]	ش (Ch ch) [ʃ]	ص (S s) [s]	ض (D d) [d]
Arabic (Latin) [IPA]	ط (T t) [t]	ظ (Z z) [z]	ع ( - ) [ʔ]	غ (Kh kh) [x]	ڠ (Ng ng) [ᵑɡ]	ف (F f) [f]
Arabic (Latin) [IPA]	ق (G g) [g]	ك (K k) [k]	ل (L l) [l]	م (M m) [m]	ݦ (Mb mb) [ᵐb]	ن (N n) [n]
Arabic (Latin) [IPA]	ه (H h) [h]	و (W w) [w]	ؤ ‌( - ) [ʔ]	ي (Y y) [j]	ئ ‌( - ) [ʔ]	

Vowel at beginning of word
A	E	Ə	I	O	U
أَ	إٜ	أ٘	إِ	أٗ	أُ
Aa	Ee	Əə	Ii	Oo	Uu
آ	إٜيـ	-	إِيـ	أٗو	أُو

Vowel at middle and end of word
a	e	ə	i	o	u
◌َ	◌ٜ	٘◌	◌ِ	ٝ◌	◌ُ
aa	ee	əə	ii	oo	uu
◌َا / ـَا	◌ٜيـ / ـٜيـ ◌ٜي / ـٜي	٘◌ا / ـ٘ا	◌ِيـ / ـِيـ ◌ِي / ـِي	ٝ◌و / ـٝو	◌ُو / ـُو
