= Wolofal alphabet =

Form of the Arabic script used for writing Wolof

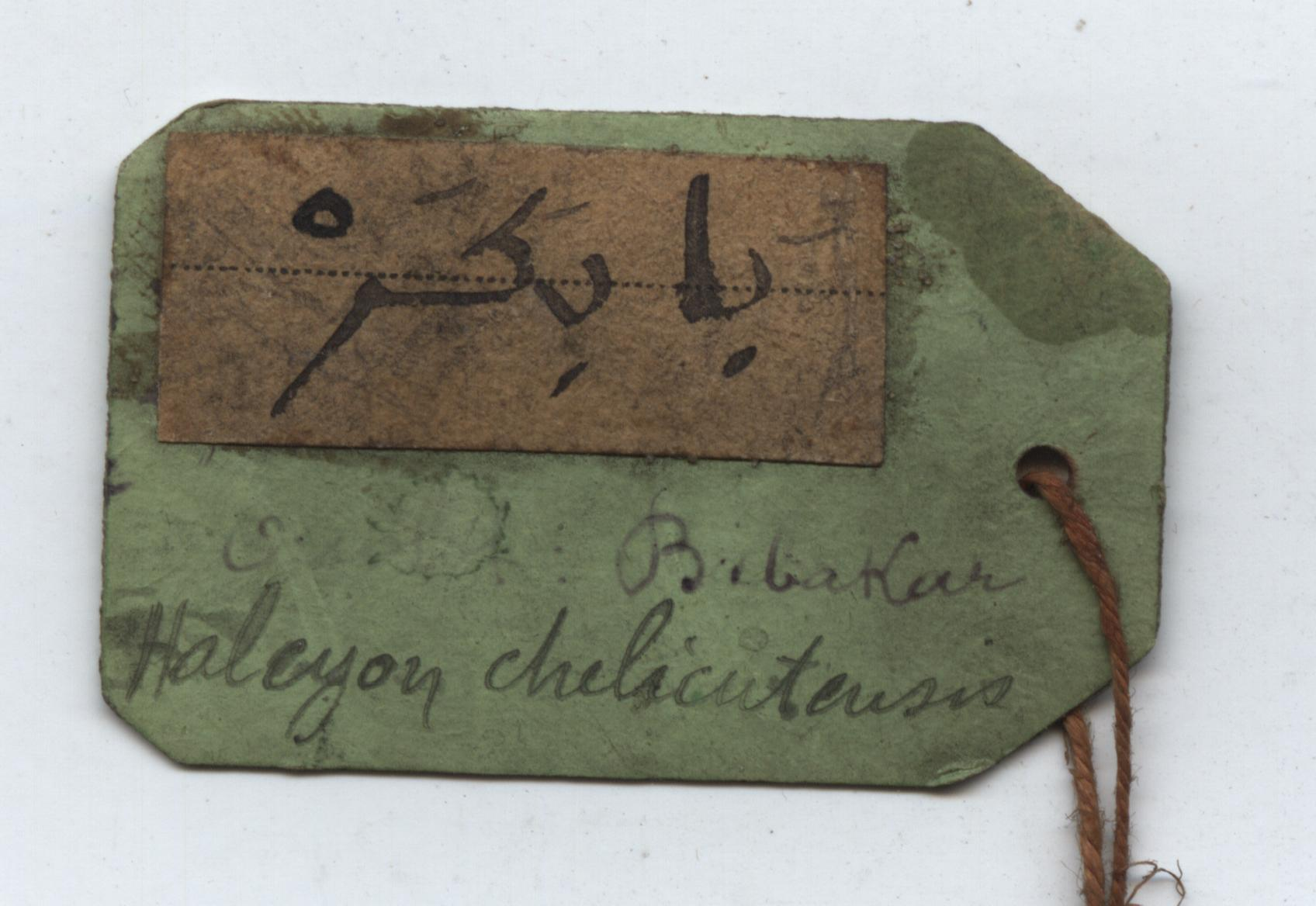
- Label of a specimen of striped kingfisher indicating the Wolof name of the bird in Latin alphabet and Wolofal.
- Script type: Abjad
- Period: c. 17th century — present
- Direction: Right-to-left
- Languages: Wolof

Related scripts
- Parent systems: Proto-Sinaitic: Phoenician; Aramaic; Nabataean; Arabic; Wolofal alphabet

Wolofal is a derivation of the Arabic script for writing the Wolof language. It is basically the name of a West African Ajami script as used for that language.

Wolofal was the first script for writing Wolof. Although the Latin alphabet is the primary official script of the language in today's Senegal, Wolofal is still used by many people as a symbol of Islamic Wolof culture. Furthermore, Wolofal orthography has been standardized in 1990 by Direction de la Promotion des Langues Nationales (DPLN) (now known as Direction de l'alphabétisation des langues nationales), an initiative of Senegal's Ministry of Education as part of a harmonized national "Arabic script". This "harmonized script is used for Wolof, Pulaar, Soninke, Mandinka, Seereer, Joola, and Balant.

The standardization of the Arabic script in Senegal was followed by an effort to teach the correct orthography to over 20,000 people, mostly Imams and their students, to write in the script. But despite the efforts of the Senegalese government in the matter, the alphabet has not been officially decreed by the government. The reason for this is that standardization of writing in Ajami script in West Africa is supposed to be a multi-national effort.

== Alphabet ==
Wolofal, like its parent system, the Arabic script, is an abjad. This means that only consonants are represented with letters. Vowels are shown with diacritics. As a matter of fact, writing of diacritics, including zero-vowel (sukun) diacritic as per the orthography are mandatory.

In order to represent sounds in Wolof that are not present in Arabic, letters as well as diacritics have been created. Historically, there were different conventions among different writers and schools, but one of the aims and achievements of the push for standardization by the Senegalese Ministry of Education has been to agree upon a unified set of letters.

=== Letters ===
There are 23 letters in Wolofal alphabet. The list does not include consonants that are used exclusively in Arabic loanwords and do not occur in Wolof words, nor does it include digraphs used for showing prenasalized consonants.

Wolofal Letters
| Name | Forms | | | | Sound represented | Latin equivalent | Example | | Notes |
| Name | Isolated | Final | Medial | Initial | Sound represented | Latin equivalent | Wolofal | Latin | Notes |
|---|---|---|---|---|---|---|---|---|---|
| alif اَلِف | ا | ـا | | ا | /a/ | / a | اِتَمْ گَالْ | itam gaal | The alif has two functions: first, to be the carrier of vowel diacritic as word initial, and second to indicate long vowel "-aa". |
| beh بࣹهْ | ب | ـب | ـبـ | بـ | [b] | b | بَاخْ | baax | |
| peh ݒࣹهْ | ݒ | ـݒ | ـݒـ | ݒـ | [p] | p | ݒࣹݒّ | pepp | Character not found in Arabic.; Obsolete Alternatives: پ, ݑ; Unicode U+0752 |
| teh تࣹهْ | ت | ـت | ـتـ | تـ | [t] | t | تَارْ | taar | |
| ceh ݖࣹهْ | ݖ | ـݖ | ـݖـ | ݖـ | [c] | c | ݖَابِ | caabi | Character not found in Arabic.; Obsolete Alternatives: چ, جۛ; Unicode U+0756 |
| seh ثࣹهْ | ث | ـث | ـثـ | ثـ | [s] | s | | | Character only used in writing of Arabic loanwords |
| jeem جࣹيمْ | ج | ـج | ـجـ | جـ | [ɟ] | j | جَايْ | jaay | |
| hah حَهْ | ح | ـح | ـحـ | حـ | [h] | h | | | Character only used in writing of Arabic loanwords |
| xah خَهْ | خ | ـخ | ـخـ | خـ | [x] | x | خَمْ | xam | |
| dal دَلْ | د | ـد | | د | [d] | d | دَانُ | daanu | |
| sal ذَلْ | ذ | ـذ | | ذ | [ɟ]~[z] | j | | | Character only used in writing of Arabic loanwords |
| reh رࣹهْ | ر | ـر | | ر | [r] | r | رَاس | raas | |
| seh زࣹهْ | ز | ـز | | ز | [ɟ]~[z] | j | | | Character only used in writing of foreign loanwords |
| seen سࣹينْ | س | ـس | ـسـ | سـ | [s] | s | سَنتْ | sant | |
| cheen شࣹينْ | ش | ـش | ـشـ | شـ | [s]~[ʃ] | s | | | Character only used in writing of foreign loanwords |
| saad صَادْ | ص | ـص | ـصـ | صـ | [s] | s | | | Character only used in writing of Arabic loanwords |
| daad ضَادْ | ض | ـض | ـضـ | ضـ | [d] | d | | | Character only used in writing of Arabic loanwords |
| taay طَايْ | ط | ـط | ـطـ | طـ | [t] | t | | | Character only used in writing of Arabic loanwords |
| saay ظَايْ | ظ | ـظ | ـظـ | ظـ | [ɟ]~[z] | j | | | Character only used in writing of Arabic loanwords |
| ayn عَيْنْ | ع | ـع | ـعـ | عـ | - | - | اِسْرَعࣹلْ دࣴعࣴلْ | Israel dëel | ‌: Used for writing vowel sequences, and mid-word syllables that start with vowels.; Used for marking long vowel "ëe", where it's written with diacritic ◌ࣴ. |
| gayn غَيْنْ | غ | ـغ | ـغـ | غـ | [ɡ] | g | | | Character only used in writing of Arabic loanwords |
| ŋoon ݝࣷونْ | ݝ | ـݝ | ـݝـ | ݝـ | [ŋ] | ŋ | ݝَامْ | ŋaam | Character not found in Arabic.; Obsolete Alternatives: ݤ,ڭ; Unicode U+075D |
| feh فࣹهْ | ف | ـف | ـفـ | فـ | [ɸ] | f | فَارْ | faar | |
| qaf قَفْ | ق | ـق | ـقـ | قـ | [q] | q | نَقَرْ | naqar | |
| kaf کَفْ | ک | ـک | ـکـ | کـ | [k] | k | کَانِ | kaani | |
| geh گࣹهْ | گ | ـگ | ـگـ | گـ | [ɡ] | g | گَالْ | gaal | Character not found in Arabic.; Obsolete Alternative: ڭ |
| lam لَمْ | ل | ـل | ـلـ | لـ | [l] | l | لَجّ | lajj | |
| meem مࣹيمْ | م | ـم | ـمـ | مـ | [m] | m | مَامْ مبَارْ | maam mbaar | Used either as an independent consonant, or as part of a digraph in prenasalized consonants. |
| noon نࣷونْ | ن | ـن | ـنـ | نـ | [n] | n | نَانْ نجࣷولْ | naan njool | Used either as an independent consonant, or as part of a digraph in prenasalized consonants. |
| ñoon ݧࣷونْ | ݧ | ـݧ | ـݧـ | ݧـ | [ɲ] | ñ | ݧَانْ | ñaan | Character not found in Arabic.; Obsolete Alternatives: چ, جۛ; Unicode U+0767 |
| waw وَوْ | و | ـو | | و | [w] | w | وَاوْ بُورْ | waaw buur | The waw has two functions: first, to be a consonant with the sound /w/, and second to indicate long vowels "-oo" "-óó", and "uu". |
| heh هࣹهْ | ه | ـه | ـهـ | هـ | [h] | h | اَهَکَايْ | ahakaay | |
| yeh يࣹهْ | ي | ـي | ـيـ | يـ | [j] | y | يَايْ نجِيتْ | yaay njiit | The yeh has two functions: first, to be a consonant with the sound /j/, and second to indicate long vowels "-ee" "-éé", and "ii". |

=== Vowels ===
Wolofal, like its parent system, the Arabic script, is an abjad. This means that only consonants are represented with letters. Vowels are shown with diacritics. As a matter of fact, writing of diacritics, including zero-vowel (sukun) diacritic as per the orthography are mandatory.

Arabic has 3 vowels, and thus 3 vowel diacritics. But in Wolof, there are 9 vowels, and as such all vowels are shown with diacritics in Wolofal. This means that on top of the 3 original diacritics, 6 additional ones have been created.

Wolofal short vowels
| Vowel | IPA | Latin eq. | Unicode | Example | | Notes |
| Vowel | IPA | Latin eq. | Unicode | Wolofal | Latin | Notes |
|---|---|---|---|---|---|---|
| ◌َ | [a] | a | U+064E | مَگْ | mag | |
| ◌ࣵ | [a] | à | U+08F5 | مࣵگّ | màgg | Diacritic not found in Arabic.; Only before a long (prenasalized or geminate) consonant.; Obsolete Alternative: ◌َ |
| ◌ࣴ | [ə] | ë | U+08F4 | بࣴتْ | bët | |
| ◌ࣹ | [ɛ] | e | U+08F9 | کࣹݒّ | kepp | Diacritic not found in Arabic.; Obsolete Alternative: ◌ٜ |
| ◌ࣺ | [e] | é | U+08FA | کࣺݒّ | képp | Diacritic not found in Arabic.; Obsolete Alternative: ◌ٜ |
| ◌ِ | [i] | i | U+0650 | اِتَمْ | itam | |
| ◌ࣷ | [ɔ] | o | U+08F7 | سࣷقْ | soq | Diacritic not found in Arabic.; Obsolete Alternative: ◌ٝ |
| ◌ࣸ | [o] | ó | U+08F8 | نࣸبْ | nób | Diacritic not found in Arabic.; Obsolete Alternative: ◌ُ |
| ◌ُ | [u] | u | U+064F | دُگُبْ | dugub | |

When vowels appear at the beginning of the word, an alif (ا) is used as the carrier of the vowel.

Vowel as first sound of word
| A | À | Ë | E | É | I | O | Ó | U |
|---|---|---|---|---|---|---|---|---|
| اَ | اࣵ | اࣴ | اࣹ | اࣺ | اِ | اࣷ | اࣸ | اُ |

Vowels in Wolof are also distinguished by length, short and long. Short vowels are only shown with a diacritic. Similar to Arabic, long vowels are indicated by writing alif (ا), waw (و), or yeh (ي). But unlike Arabic, this does not mean that the vowel diacritic can be dropped. It cannot, as there 8 vowels and not 3. Vowel "à" (◌ࣵ) does not have a long version.

- For vowel "a" (◌َ), the vowel is lengthened (aa) with an alif (ا)
- For vowels "e", "é", or "i", the vowel is lengthened (ee, ée, ii) with a yeh (ي).
- For vowels "o", "ó", or "u", the vowel is lengthened (oo, óo, uu) with a waw (و).
- The vowel "ë" is an exception, where it is lengthened (ëe) as if it's a vowel sequence (ë-ë), with an ayn and an "ë" diacritic (عࣴـ)

Wolofal long vowels
| Vowel | Latin equivalent | Example | |
| Vowel | Latin equivalent | Wolofal | Latin |
|---|---|---|---|
| ◌َا | aa | بَاتْ | baat |
| ◌ࣴعࣴـ / ◌ࣴعࣴ | ëe | دࣴعࣴلْ | dëel |
| ◌ࣹيـ / ◌ࣹي | ee | لࣹينْ | leen |
| ◌ࣺيـ / ◌ࣺي | ée | لࣺينْ | léen |
| ◌ِيـ / ◌ِي | ii | نجِيتْ | njiit |
| ◌ࣷو | oo | وࣷورْ | woor |
| ◌ࣸو | óo | وࣸورْ | wóor |
| ◌ُو | uu | بُورْ | buur |

The same principle is followed for when a long vowel is at the beginning of a word. An alif (ا) is used as the carrier of the vowel, followed by either waw (و) or yeh (ي) as appropriate. The exception is when a word starts with the long vowel "Aa". Instead of two alifs (اا) being used, an alif-maddah (آ) is used.

Vowel as first sound of word
| Aa | Ëe | Ee | Ée | Ii | Oo | Óo | Uu |
|---|---|---|---|---|---|---|---|
| آ | اࣴعࣴـ / اࣴعࣴ | اࣹيـ / اࣹي | اࣺيـ / اࣺي | اِيـ / اِي | اࣷو | اࣸو | اُو |

=== Consonant diacritics ===
There are two consonant diacritics in Wolofal alphabet. These are shadda (◌ّ) indicating gemination, and sukun (◌ْ) indicating zero-vowel.

These two diacritics cannot appear on the same consonant simultaneously. Geminated consonants only ever occur either at the end of the word, or before a suffix.

All consonants require either a vowel diacritic or one of these diacritics (or a vowel diacritic combined with shadda) except in two cases:

1. When a consonant is prenasalized, and is thus shown with a digraph including either the letter m "م" or n "ن". In these cases, the letters m "م" or n "ن" will remain with no diacritic.
2. When the letter in question is alif (ا), waw (و), or yeh (ي) and its function in the word is to indicate a long vowel, it will remain unmarked.

Unlike Arabic, it is possible for a consonant to take shadda (◌ّ) while not having consonants. This phenomenon mostly occurs at the end of words. Native Wolof speakers pronounce geminated nouns not as doubles but simply longer. But the distinction is essential, as the meaning of a word can change. Table below provides some examples:

| Wolofal | Latin | Meaning | Wolofal | Latin | Meaning |
|---|---|---|---|---|---|
| بࣴتْ | bët | eye | بࣴتّ | bëtt | to find |
| بࣷیْ | boy | to catch fire | بࣷیّ | boyy | to be glimmering |
| دَگْ | dag | a royal servant | دَگّ | dagg | to cut |
| دࣴجْ | dëj | funeral | دࣴجّ | dëjj | cunt |
| فࣹنْ | fen | to (tell a) lie | فࣹنّ | fenn | somewhere, nowhere |
| گَلْ | gal | white gold | گَلّ | gall | to regurgitate |
| ݝࣷنْ | goŋ | baboon | ݝࣷنّ | goŋŋ | a kind of bed |
| گࣴمْ | gëm | to believe | گࣴمّ | gëmm | to close one's eyes |
| جَوْ | Jaw | a family name | جَوّ | jaww | heaven |
| نࣴبْ | nëb | rotten | نࣴبّ | nëbb | to hide |
| وࣷݧْ | woñ | thread | وࣷݧّ | woññ | to count |

=== Prenasalized consonants ===
Prenasalized consonants are written as a digraph (combination of two consonants). While historically there were single letter alternatives, these letters are no longer used. Prenasalized consonants are constructed using meem (م) or noon (ن) in combination with other consonants. The letter meem (م) appears in pairs with beh (ب) or peh (ݒ), whereas the letter noon (ن) appears in pairs with teh (ت), ceh (ݖ), dal (د), jeem (ج), qaf (ق), kaf (ک), and geh (گ). Some digraphs cannot appear at the beginning of words, -mp (مݒ), -nc (نݖ), -nq (نق).

Prenasalized consonants cannot take the zero-vowel diacritic sukun (◌ْ). If they are at the end of the word and have no vowels, they will take the gemination diacritic shadda (◌ّ).

Some Wolof-speaking authors treat these digraphs as their own independent letters.

Wolofal prenasalized Consonant Digraphs
| Forms | | | | Sound represented | Latin equivalent | Example | | Notes |
| Isolated | Final | Medial | Initial | Sound represented | Latin equivalent | Wolofal | Latin | Notes |
|---|---|---|---|---|---|---|---|---|
| مب | ـمبّ | ـمبـ | مبـ | [ᵐb] | mb | مبَارْ | mbaar | Obsolete Alternative: ݑ |
| مݒ | ـمݒّ | ـمݒـ | - | [ᵐp] | mp | سَمݒّ | samp | Cannot exist at the beginning of a word |
| نݖ | ـنݖّ | ـنݖـ | - | [ⁿc] | nc | سَنݖّ | sanc | Cannot exist at the beginning of a word |
| ند | ـندّ | ـند | ند | [ⁿd] | nd | ندَوْ | ndaw | Obsolete Alternative: ڎ |
| نج | ـنجّ | ـنجـ | نجـ | [ᶮɟ] | nj | نجࣷولْ | njool | Obsolete Alternative: چ |
| نق | ـنقّ | ـنقـ | - | [ⁿq] | nq | جَنقّ | janq | Cannot exist at the beginning of a word |
| نک | ـنکّ | ـنکـ | نکـ | [ɴk] | nk | دࣺنکّ | dénk | |
| نگ | ـنگّ | ـنگـ | نگـ | [ᵑɡ] | ng | نگَ | nga | Obsolete Alternative: ݣ; Important to note that it is different from ݝ |

== Sample text ==
Article 1 of the Universal Declaration of Human Rights

| Translation | Latin Script | Wolofal (Arabic) Script |
|---|---|---|
| All human beings are born free and equal in dignity and rights. They are endowed with reason and conscience and should act towards one another in a spirit of brotherhood. | Doomi aadama yépp danuy juddu, yam ci tawfeex ci sag ak sañ-sañ. Nekk na it ku xam dëgg te ànd na ak xelam, te war naa jëflante ak nawleen, te teg ko ci wàllu mbokk. | دࣷومِ آدَمَ يࣺݒّ دَنُيْ جُدُّ، يَمْ ݖِ تَوفࣹيخْ ݖِ سَگْ اَکْ سَݧْ-سَݧْ. نࣹکّ نَ اِتْ کُ خَمْ دࣴگّ تࣹ اࣵندْ نَ خࣹلَمْ، تࣹ وَرْ نَا جࣴفْلَنْتࣹ اَکْ نَوْلࣹينْ، تࣹ تࣹگْ کࣷ ݖِ وࣵلُّ مبࣷکّ. |

== Bibliography ==
- Mamadou Cissé: « Graphical borrowing and African realities » in Revue du Musée National d'Ethnologie d'Osaka, Japan, June 2000.
- Mamadou Cissé: « Écrits et écritures en Afrique de l'Ouest » in Sud Langues June 2006.
- PanAfriL10n Wolof
