= Saharan languages =

Small language family in the East Sahara desert

Saharan
- Geographic distribution: Chad, Nigeria, Niger, Sudan, Cameroon
- Linguistic classification: Nilo-Saharan?: Saharan
- Subdivisions: Eastern Saharan; Western Saharan

Language codes
- Glottolog: saha1256
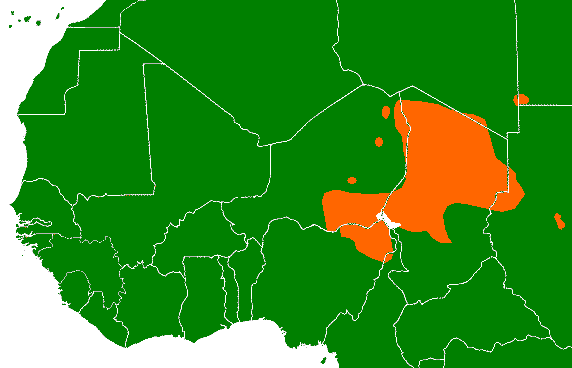
- Range of the Saharan languages (in orange)

The Saharan languages are a small family of languages across parts of the eastern Sahara, extending from northwestern Sudan to southern Libya, north and central Chad, eastern Niger and northeastern Nigeria. Noted Saharan languages include Kanuri (9.5 million speakers, around Lake Chad in Chad, Nigeria, Niger, and Cameroon), Daza (700,000 speakers, Chad), Teda (60,000 speakers, northern Chad), and Zaghawa (350,000 speakers, eastern Chad and Sudan). They have been classified as part of the hypothetical but controversial Nilo-Saharan family.

A comparative word list of the Saharan languages has been compiled by Václav Blažek (2007).

== Internal classification ==
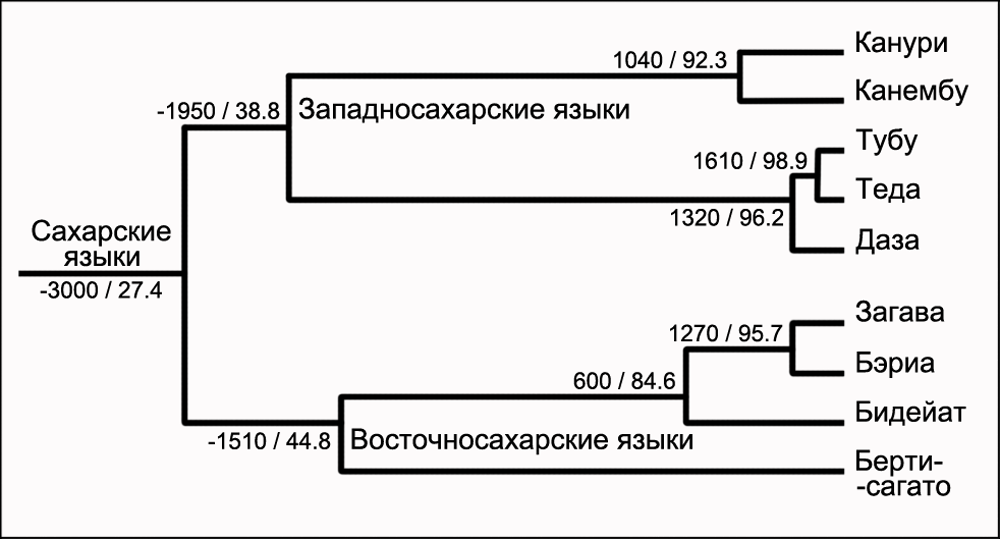
Václav Blažek's 2007 classification of the Saharan languages

- Saharan
  - Eastern
    - Berti † (a.k.a. Sagato; extinct)
    - Zaghawa (a.k.a. Beria)
  - Western
    - Kanuri
      - Kanuri (Bilma, Manga, Tumari, Central)
      - Kanembu (Tarjumo)
    - Tebu
      - Daza
      - Teda

== External classification ==
Roger Blench argues that the Saharan and Songhay languages form a Songhay-Saharan branch with each other within the wider Nilo-Saharan linguistic phylum.

== Reconstruction ==
Cyffer (2020:385) gives the following Proto-Saharan reconstructions:

Gloss	Proto-Saharan	Kanuri	Teda-Daza	Beria
mouth	*kai	cî	kai	āā
tongue	*tiram	tə́lam	tirmẽ́su	tàmsī
ear	*simo	sə́mo	šímo	
liver	*masin	kəmáttən	maasen	màī
knee	*kurum	ngurumngurum		kórú
person	*am	âm (pl.)	amo	ɔ̄ɔ̄
leaf	*kur	kálú	kólú	ɔ́gʊ́r
big	*kut	kúra	kɔra	ʊ́gʊ́rī
that	*tu	túdu	te̥ye	tɔ̄
to die	*nu	nú	nus	nʊ́í
to come	*it	ís	ri	tíí
to see	*tu	rú	ru	ír̥ì
to drink	*sa	yá, sá	ya	yá
to say	*n	n	n	n

== Comparative vocabulary ==
Sample basic vocabulary of Saharan languages from Blažek (2007):

Language	eye	ear	nose	tooth	tongue	mouth	blood	bone	tree	water	eat	name
Kanuri	shîm	sə́mò	kə́nzà	tímì; shélì	tə́làm	cî	bû	shíllà	kə̀ská	njî	bù	cû
Tubu	*samo > sómo > sao / sā /sa	súmo/šímo > sĩ/šiĩ /si/ši	kya / ca	tomai / tẽ̱ < *temi, pl. toa / tī́	tirmḗsu > tirišī́ / tərše > tərhi	kai > kī > ci	gẹrε	súru / súrki	akkέ, pl. akká / εkέ	iyī́ / yi	bo / bu	súro / súru
Daza	sama, sa, pl. saã	ši, pl. šiĩ	ca	tei, pl. teẽ / tiĩ	teleši / East terihi	ci, pl. ka	gəre	sọr(o)	ekke, pl. akka	yi / ii	bọr / owe / bọdər	sorọ, pl. sora
Teda	samo, saõ, pl. sama	šimi, šiĩ, pl. šima	ca	tome, pl. toma	termeso	koe, pl. ka	gɔrε, gəre	sọr(o), sọrce	ekke, pl. akka	yi	bọr / cọbo / bọdər	cεr / cero / curo
Zaghawa	í	kέbέ	síná	màrgi:	tàmsi:	áá	ógú	úrú	bɛ̀gìdi:	bí	sε:gì	tír
Beria	íī:	kέbέ	sɪ́na:	màrgi:	tàm(ì)si:	áá	ógu:	úrú	bɛ̀gìdi:	bíi:	sέ-	tɪ́r
Bideyat	’é	kèmé	šéna	margé	tamišé	a		uru	ʔèbè	bi	šé	
Berti / Sagato		ke(i)ng	sano / sāno		tam(ī)si	a / á / ā	àkú	shuru / shírung		mi / mī /mī́		tir(r)

=== Numerals ===
Comparison of numerals in individual languages:

Classification	Language	1	2	3	4	5	6	7	8	9	10
Eastern	Zaghawa	nɔ́kkɔ	súyi	wɛɛ	ístîː	hóíyi	dɛ́stɛ́	dístiː	ɔ́ttɛ́	dístî	sóɡódí
Western, Kanuri	Kanembu	tūló	yìndí	yàkú	dīyə̄u	úù	àràkú	túlùr	ùskú	lár	mìyò̬u
Western, Kanuri	Central Kanuri (1)	tiló, fál	indí	yakkə́	déɣə́	úwu	arakkə́	túlur	wuskú	ləɣár	mewú
Western, Kanuri	Central Kanuri (2)	tìlo / fal / lasku	ìndi	yàkkə	deɡə	uwù	àràkkə	tulùr	wùskú	lə̀ɡar / làar	mèwu
Western, Kanuri	Manga Kanuri	tìló, fál	yìndí	yàkkú	déwú	úwù	àràkkú	túlùr	wùskú	ləɡár	mèwú
Western, Kanuri	Tumari Kanuri	tìló	jìndí	jàkú	dʲíjó	úù	àɾàkú	túúlù	ùskú	lááɽú	mèʲó
Western, Tebu	Dazaga (Tubu)	tə̀ɾɔ̌n	tʃúú	àɡʊ̀zʊ́ʊ́	tʊ̀zɔ́ɔ́	fòú	dìsí	túɾùsù	wʊ́ssʊ̀	jìsìí	mʊ́rdə̀m
Western, Tebu	Tedaga (Tebu) (1)	tɾɔ̀ɔ́	cúː	òɡòzú	tʊ̀zɔ́ː	fɔ́ː	dɪ̀sɪ́ː	túɾùsù	jʊ́sʊ̀	jìsíː	mʊ́rdɔ̀m
Western, Tebu	Tedaga (Tebu) (2)	tʊrɔ	cu	oɡuzuu	tʊzɔɔ	hɔɔ	diʃee	tuduʃu	yʊsʊ	yisii	mʊrdɔm

== See Also ==
- Kanem-Bornu Empire
