= Teda language =

Nilo-Saharan language of the east-central Sahara

Teda
- Tedaga
- Native to: Chad, Libya, Niger
- Region: BET, Kanem, Tibesti, Murzuq, Agadez
- Ethnicity: Teda
- Native speakers: 130,000 (2020–2024)
- Language family: Nilo-Saharan?: Saharan; Western; Tebu; Teda
- Writing system: Latin

Language codes
- ISO 639-3: tuq
- Glottolog: teda1241
- ELP: Tedaga
- Linguasphere: 02-BAA-aa

The Teda language, also known as Tedaga, Todaga, Todga, or Tudaga is a Nilo-Saharan language spoken by the Teda, a northern subgroup of the Toubou people who inhabit southern Libya, northern Chad and eastern Niger. A small number also inhabit northeastern Nigeria.

Along with the more populous southern dialect of Daza, the northern Teda dialect constitutes one of the two varieties of Tebu. However, Teda is also sometimes used for Tebu in general.

== Phonology ==
=== Consonants ===
Consonants
		Labial	Alveolar	Post- alveolar	Palatal	Velar	Glottal
Plosive/ Affricate	voiceless	p	t	t͡ʃ		k	
Plosive/ Affricate	voiced	b	d	d͡ʒ		g	
Nasal		m	n		ɲ	ŋ	
Fricative	voiceless	f	s	ʃ	ç		h
Fricative	voiced	v	z			ɣ	
Approximant			l		j	w	

=== Vowels ===
Vowels
	Front	Central	Back
Close	i	ʉ	u
Near-close	ɪ		ʊ
Close-mid	e		o
Mid		ə	
Open-mid	ɛ		ɔ
Open		a	

== Alphabet ==
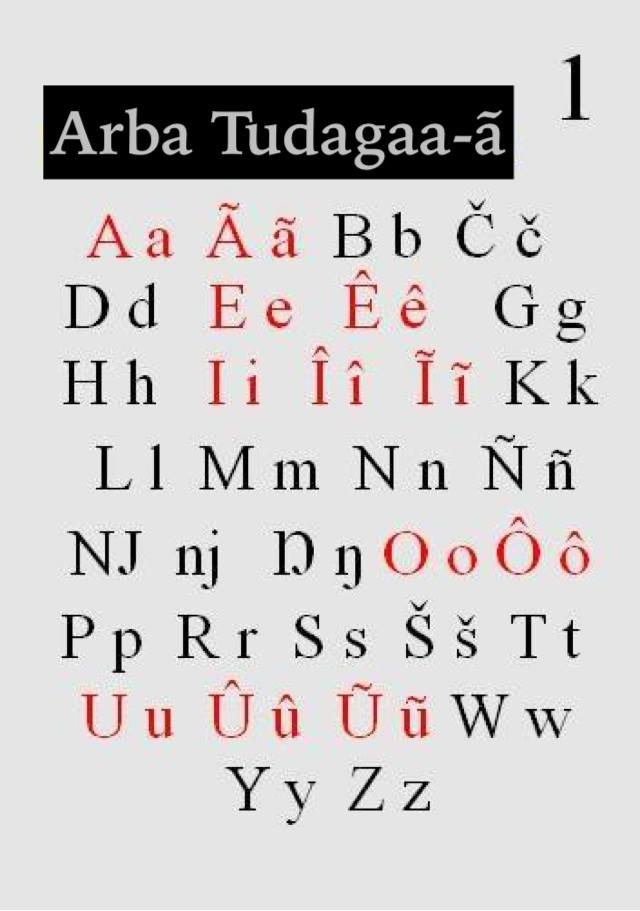
The Teda (Tedaga) Latin alphabet

Teda alphabet
A a	Ã ã	B b	Č č	D d	E e	Ê ê	G g	H h	I i	Î î	Ĩ ĩ	K k	L l	M m	N n	Ñ ñ
Ǌ ǌ	Ŋ ŋ	O o	Ô ô	P p	R r	S s	Š š	T t	U u	Û û	Ũ ũ	W w	Y y	Z z	Y y	Z z
