= Kanuri language =

Saharan dialect continuum of West Africa

Kanuri
- Kànùrí كَنُرِيِه
- Native to: Cameroon; Chad; Niger; Nigeria
- Region: Lake Chad
- Ethnicity: Kanuri; Kanembu
- Native speakers: 10.6 million (2019–2024)
- Language family: Nilo-Saharan?: Saharan; Western; Kanuri
- Writing system: Latin; Arabic (Ajami)

Language codes
- ISO 639-1: kr
- ISO 639-2: kau
- ISO 639-3: kau – inclusive code Individual codes: knc – Central Kanuri kby – Manga Kanuri krt – Tumari Kanuri bms – Bilma Kanuri kbl – Kanembu txj – Old Kanembu
- Glottolog: kanu1279
- Linguasphere: 02-AAA-a
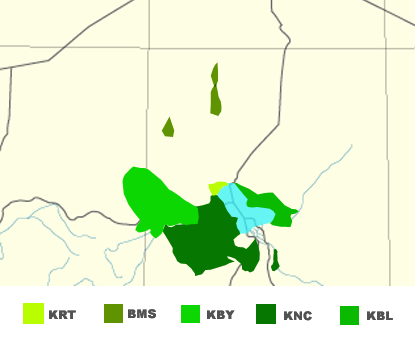
- Map of the majority usage of the five major languages of the Kanuri language group. KRT Kanuri, Tumari BMS Kanuri, Bilma KBY Kanuri, Manga KNC Kanuri, Central KBL Kanembu

Kanuri (/kəˈnʊəri/; endonym: Kànùrí (Latin script), كَنُرِيِه (Ajami)) is a Saharan dialect continuum of the Nilo–Saharan language family spoken by the Kanuri and Kanembu peoples in Nigeria, Niger, Chad and Cameroon, as well as by a diaspora community residing in Sudan.

== Background ==
At the turn of the 21st century, its two main dialects, Manga Kanuri and Yerwa Kanuri (also called Beriberi, which its speakers consider to be pejorative), were spoken by 9,700,000 people in Central Africa. It belongs to the Western Saharan subphylum of Nilo-Saharan. Kanuri is the language associated with the Kanem and Bornu empires that dominated the Lake Chad region for a thousand years.

The basic word order of Kanuri sentences is subject–object–verb. It is typologically unusual in simultaneously having postpositions and post-nominal modifiers – for example, 'Bintu's pot' would be expressed as nje Bintu-be, 'pot Bintu-of'.

Kanuri has three tones: high, low, and falling. It has an extensive system of consonantal lenition; for example, sa- 'they' + -buma 'have eaten' → za-wuna 'they have eaten'.

Traditionally a local lingua franca, its usage has declined in recent decades. Most first-language speakers speak Hausa or Arabic as a second language.

== Geographic distribution ==
Kanuri is spoken mainly in lowlands of the Chad Basin, with speakers in Cameroon, Chad, Niger, Nigeria, Sudan and Libya.

=== By country ===
==== Nigeria ====
The Kanuri region in Nigeria consists of Borno State and Yobe State. Some other states such as Jigawa, Gombe and Bauchi are also has small number of Kanuri people, but they are not included in this region. Cities and towns where Kanuri is spoken include Maiduguri, Damaturu, Hadejia, Kano, Kaduna, Gusau, Jos and Lafia.

The Kanuri in central Nigeria are also referred to as Bare-Bari or Beriberi.

Central Kanuri, also known as Yerwa Kanuri, is used in Nigeria as a de facto language of provincial identity in Borno, Yobe, and Gombe states.

Manga Kanuri, which is spoken by the Kanuri people in Yobe State, Jigawa State and Bauchi State, is also referred to as Manga, Mangari or Mangawa, and it is distinct from Central Kanuri.

The Kanembu language is also spoken in Borno State on the border with Chad.

==== Niger ====
In Niger, the Kanuri region is composed of Diffa Region and Zinder Region in the southeast. Parts of Agadez Region are also Kanuri. Cities where it is spoken include Zinder, Diffa, N'Guigmi and Bilma.

In Zinder region, the main dialect is Manga. In Diffa Region, the main dialect is Tumari or Kanembu; Kanembu is spoken by a minority. In Agadez Region, the main dialect is Bilma. Central Kanuri is a minority dialect, and is also referred to as Bare-Bari or Beriberi.

== Varieties ==
Ethnologue divides Kanuri into the following languages, while many linguists (e.g. Cyffer 1998) regard them as dialects of a single language. The first three are spoken by ethnic Kanuri and thought by them as dialects of their language.

- Central Kanuri
- Manga Kanuri
- Tumari Kanuri
- Bilma Kanuri (or Bilms)
- Kanembu

The variety attested in 17th-century Qur'anic glosses is known as Old Kanembu. In the context of religious recitation and commentaries, a heavily archaizing descendant of this is still used, called Tarjumo.

== Phonology ==
=== Consonants ===
	Bilabial	Labio- dental	Alveolar	Post- alveolar	Palatal	Velar	Glottal
Plosive	(p) b		t d			k ɡ	ʔ
Affricate				t͡ʃ d͡ʒ			
Fricative	(ɸ β)	f	s z	ʃ		(ɣ)	h
Nasal	m		n			(ŋ)	
Lateral			l	(ɭ)			
Trill			r				
Approximant	w				j		

- There may also exist prenasalized voiced stop consonant sounds /mb, nd, ŋɡ/, although it is not known whether they are considered phonemic.
- The sound /p/ occurs mainly as an allophone of /b/, when following another voiceless plosive. It also may be in free variation with /f/; however, it is still represented in the standard Kanuri orthography.
- A voiceless fricative [ɸ] occurs as an allophone of /f/ when preceding back vowels /o, u/. A voiced fricative [β] occurs as an allophone of /b/, when occurring in intervocalic positions. A voiced fricative [ɣ] occurs as an allophone of /ɡ/, when occurring intervocalically between central vowels.
- A retroflex lateral sound [ɭ] is heard when /l/ is followed by /i/.
- [ŋ] occurs as an allophone of /n/ when preceding velar stop consonants. Often, the stop sounds are deleted or misheard, so just the nasal sound [ŋ] is mainly heard.

=== Vowels ===
	Front	Central	Back
Close	i	(ɨ)	u
Close-mid	e	ə	o
Open-mid		ə	ʌ
Open		a	

- [ɨ] is heard as an allophone of /ə/.

== Written Kanuri ==
Kanuri has been written using the Ajami Arabic script, mainly in religious or court contexts, for at least four hundred years. More recently, it is also sometimes written in a modified Latin script. The Gospel of John published in 1965 was produced in Roman and Arabic script.

=== Alphabet ===
A standardized romanized orthography (known as the Standard Kanuri Orthography in Nigeria) was developed by the Kanuri Research Unit and the Kanuri Language Board. Its elaboration, based on the dialect of Maiduguri, was carried out by the Orthography Committee of the Kanuri Language Board, under the Chairmanship of Abba Sadiq, Waziri of Borno. It was officially approved by the Kanuri Language Board in Maiduguri, Nigeria, in 1975.

Letters used : a b c d e ǝ f g h i j k l m n ny o p r ɍ s sh t u w y z.

== Pronouns in Kanuri ==
	Singular	Plural
1st person	wú, ú	àndí
2nd person	ní	nàndí, nàyí
3rd person	tí	tàndí, tàyí

== Oral literature ==
In 1854, Sigismund Koelle published African Native Literature, or Proverbs, Tales, Fables, and Historical Fragments in the Kanuri or Bornu Language which contains texts in Kanuri and in English translation. There is a selection of proverbs, stories and fables, and historical fragments. In his English translation, Koelle misidentifies the trickster ground-squirrel, kə̀nyérì, as a weasel.

Richard Francis Burton in his Wit and Wisdom from West Africa included a selection of the proverbs reported by Koelle. Here are some of those proverbs:

- "Angalte silman gani karga, kalalan karga." "Wisdom is not in the eye, but in the head." (#5)
- "Tama sugo diniabe." "Hope is the pillar of the world." (#16)
- "Ago fugubete, komande genya, ngudo dabu kuruguamai tsurui bago." "As to what is future, even a bird with a long neck cannot see it, but the Lord only." (#32)
- "Bulturo dinia watsi tsabalan." "It became day whilst the hyena was on its way (i.e. the man's strength was broken before he attained his object)." (#41)
- "Ngurtu kamawunga da tsogo tilon kotsena, kamawun gurtuga sila tsogo tilon kotsena." "A hippopotamus exceeds an elephant by one basket of flesh, and an elephant exceeds a hippopotamus by one basket of bones." (#78)

== Sample text in Kanuri (Universal Declaration of Human Rights) ==
Hakkiwa-a nambe a suro Wowur abəden dəganadə ndu-a nduana-aso kartaa, gayirtə futubibema baaro, gayirta alama jiilibeso, kadigəbeso, alagəbeso, təlambeso, adinbeso, siyasabeso au rayiwu, lardə gade au kaduwu gade, kənganti, tambo au awowa laa gade anyiga samunzəna. Anyibe ngawoman nduma kəla siyasaben, kal kəntəwoben kal au daraja dunyalabe sawawuro kal kərye au lardə kamdə dəganabe sawawuro gayirtinba. Lardə shi gultənama adə kərmai kəlanzəben karga, amanaro musko lardə gadeben karga, kəlanzəlangənyi karga au sədiya kaidawa kəntəwobe laan karga yaye kal.

Translation

Everyone is entitled to all the rights and freedoms set forth in this Declaration, without distinction of any kind, such as race, colour, sex, language, religion, political or other opinion, national or social origin, property, birth or other status. Furthermore, no distinction shall be made on the basis of the political, jurisdictional or international status of the country or territory to which a person belongs, whether it be independent, trust, non-self-governing or under an other limitation of sovereignty.

(Article 2 of the Universal Declaration of Human Rights).

== See also ==
- Kanuri word list (Wiktionary)
