= Ajami script =

Arabic-derived script used to write non-Arabic languages

Ajami عجمي (Arabic)
- Period: c. 10 c. to the present
- Direction: Right-to-left
- Languages: Bambara, Dyula, Fula, Harari, Hausa, Kanuri, Koti, Makhuwa, Malagasy, Mandinka, Nupe, Old Kanembu, Serer, Shikomori, Somali, Songhay, Soninke, Susu, Swahili, Tamasheq, Wolof, Yoruba, etc.

Related scripts
- Parent systems: Proto-Sinaitic: Phoenician; Aramaic; Nabataean; Arabic; Ajami

Ajami (Arabic: عجمي, romanized: ʿajamī) or Ajamiyya (عجمية, ʿajamiyyah), is a variety of Arabic-derived scripts used for writing African languages such as Songhai, Mandé, Fula, Hausa and Swahili, although multiple other languages are also written using the script, including Mooré, Wolof, Kanuri, and Yoruba. They are adaptations of the Arabic script to write sounds not found in Standard Arabic. Rather than adding new letters, modifications usually consist of additional dots or lines added to pre-existing letters.

== Etymology ==
The word Ajami comes from an Arabic word meaning foreign or stranger, referring to non-Arabic speakers, hence the term Ajami was used for non-Arabic languages written in Arabic script.

== History ==
=== West Africa ===
African languages were first written in Ajami scripts between the 10th and the 12th centuries. It likely was originally created with the intent of promoting Islam in West Africa. The first languages written in the script were likely old Taseelhit or medieval Amazigh, Kanuri, or Songhay.

The oldest surviving usage of Ajami comes from 13th century tomb inscriptions in modern-day Niger, where Arabic inscriptions often contained individual Songhay words in titles or names, like in the example below where the Songhay word is highlighted.

Hāđā al-qabr al-wazīr Muħammad Ariyaw ẓammu Kawkaw bin Būbakar "This is the tomb of Muhammad Ariyaw praise-named Kawkaw son of Boubacar." Fatima Kayna bint... "Little Fatima, daughter of..."

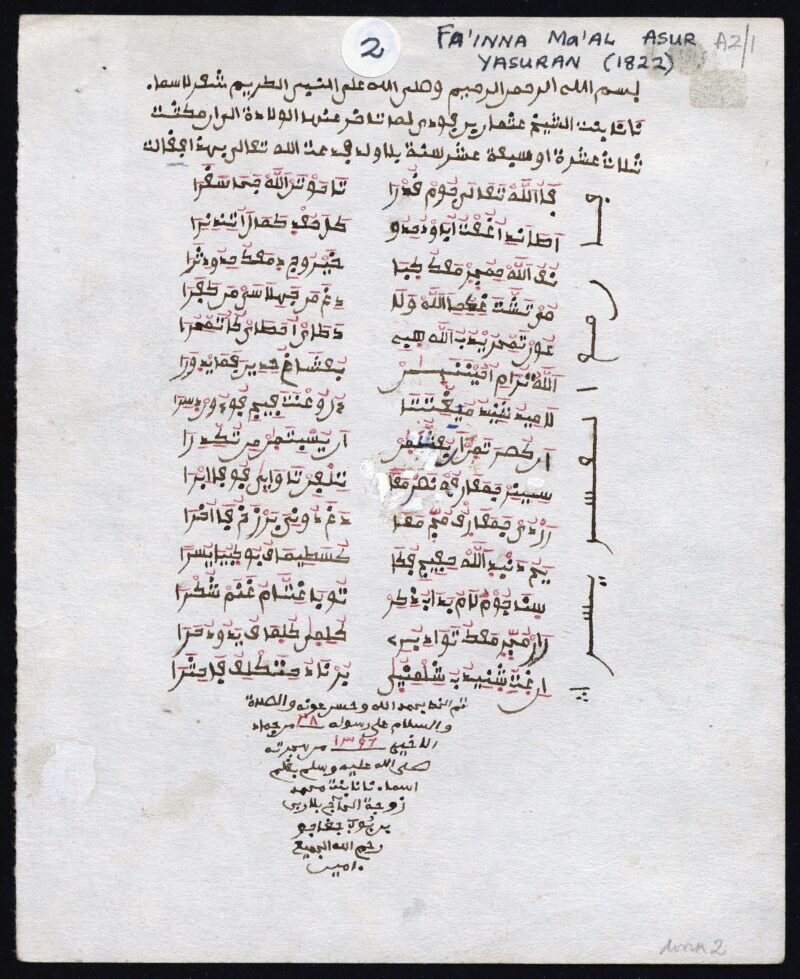
Fa'inna ma'al Asur yasuran, a poem written in Fulfulde Ajami by Nana Asma'u in 1822. Nana Asma'u was a female princess, poet and author from the Sokoto Caliphate (modern-day northern Nigeria).

The older examples of Ajami are all notes taken by scribes in the margins of books written primarily in Arabic. Later, Fulfulde, Hausa, Wolof and Mandinke would use the script, with full books and poetry written in Ajami, and vast literary traditions emerging. By the 17th century, the script was being used to publish religious texts and poetry. Fulani poetry from the Futa Jallon region in Guinea was written in Ajami from the middle of the 18th century.

During the pre-colonial period, Qur'anic schools taught Muslim children Arabic and, by extension, Ajami. After Western colonization, a Latin orthography for Hausa was adopted and the Ajami script declined in popularity. Some anti-colonial groups and movements continued to use Ajami. An Islamic revival in the 19th century led to a wave of Ajami written works.

Ajami remains in widespread use among Islamic circles but exists in digraphia among the broader populace. Ajami is used ceremonially and for specific purposes, such as for local herbal preparations in the Jula language. In some areas of Ghana, Ajami is still seen in newspapers, advertisements, and daily life.

=== East Africa ===
In the 8th or 9th centuries, around the same time as West Africa, the coasts of Kenya, Tanzania and Mozambique started to gain Muslim settlements, which brought Arabic writing into East Africa. While these city states had been Muslim for centuries, it was only in the early 17th century that Swahili Ajami was first written. Hamziya is the oldest book written entirely in Swahili. The Comoro islands also became Muslim at around the same time and had extensive contact with Swahili traders, hence Swahili Ajami and its orthography migrated to the Comorian Ajami. For centuries, Swahili was written with no modification from the original Arabic alphabet, and was indistinguishable from Arabic in appearance.

After contact and later colonisation, the Latin alphabet greatly diminished the use of Swahili Ajami and the other East African languages with adopted Swahili conventions. However in the 19th, 20th and 21st centuries there were movements for the "Swahilization" of the script, and standards were adopted. While the Swahili dialects in Lamu and Zanzibar were the basis of Swahili heritage for centuries, scholars in Mombasa and even in Barawa were the first to suggest reforms, such as Mwalimu Sikujua, resulting in many competing standards between cities.

The Ajami for the Comorian dialects however followed a completely different path from Swahili and the rest of Africa. In 1960 the standardisation of Comorian Ajami was undertaken by Said Kamar-Eddine, who had a different philosophy when it came to the writing system. He paid attention to the trends that were happening in Central Asia, specifically the Irani and Iraqi Kurdistan movement, where they ditched the abjad system and decided to represent vowels as characters, creating a full alphabet. Hence while Swahili added diacritics to represent a wider array of vowels, diacritics were ditched entirely in Comoros.

Today the most accepted form of Swahili Ajami is by Mu'allim Sheikh Yahya Ali Omar, based on Mombasa since it has historically been a crossgrounds for all dialects of Swahili.

== Orthography ==
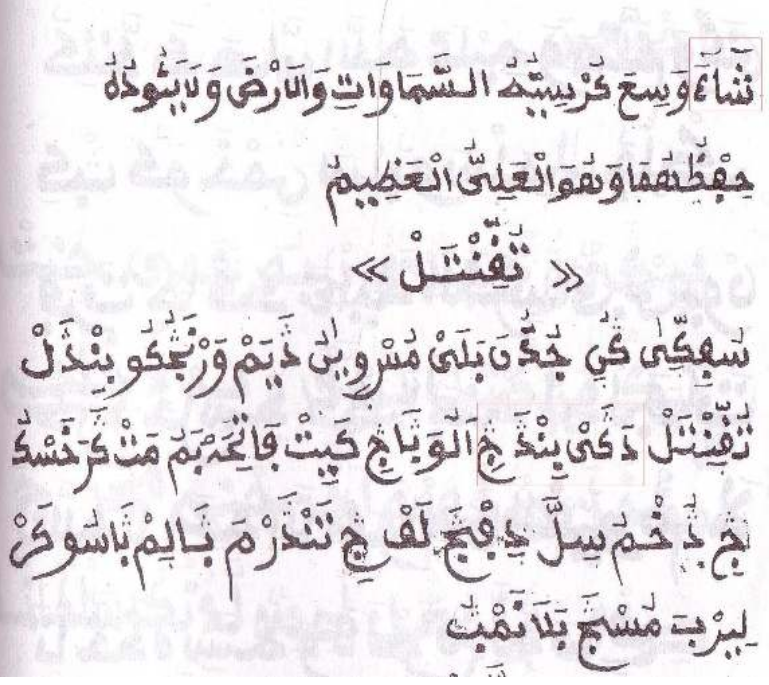
The second section showcases the Senegalese Orthography of an "Ajami diacritic", showing which characters should be read in their Wolof/Pulaar equivalent sound.

While Ajami refers to a widespread, diverse practice, there are many universal similarities in West Africa. This is not the case in Ajami written for Comorian and Swahili scripts. This is mainly because of Islam in West Africa coming from the North African Maliki school, which authored texts in the Maghrebi script. Some universal features of Ajami include the following:

- Qāf ق is written with only one dot instead of two (ڧ)
- Fā' ف is written with the dot placed below (ڢ)
- Nūn ن is often written without the dot word in its final form (ں)
- Shaddah ـّ (the gemination marker) is written as a v-sign instead of a w-sign ᵛ
- Tashkil, writing out the vowel diacritics, is done in all contexts

As for some common yet not universal similarities, some Ajami conventions, like the ones written for Kanuri, Soninke and Susu, adopted the Warsh orthography for Imala. Imala is the fronting of the /aː/ toward /iː/, which in many Qur'anic recitations tends to approximate an [e]. The Warsh orthography marks this for certain words using an alif with a filled dot below (approximately ا̩ ), which was appropriated to a subscript dot diacritic for the vowel in Kanuri and Susu.

It was also important in some contexts to distinguish characters that were used in an Arabic or Ajami context. In Wolof and Pulaar Ajami in the Senegalese/Guinean area for example, it was standard to write three dots in a noticeably smaller configuration to signify that the letter should be read in its non-Arabic equivalent.

== Table ==
A summary of the different alphabets of Ajami in some languages can be found below, however with several of the intricacies omitted. For example many characters are used only for loanwords in some Ajami scripts, which have been removed from the table.

IPA	Script									
IPA	Unicode	Arabic	Fula	Hausa	Kanuri	Mandinka	Soninke	Songhay	Susu	Wolof
[ʔ]	أ	أ	أ	أ	أ	أ	أ		أ	أ
[b]	ب	ب	ب	ب	ب	ب	ب	ب	ب	ب
[ɓ]	ݒ		ٻ	ݑ، ٻ						
[p]	پ		ڤ		پ	ٻ	پ	پ	پ	پ
[t]	ت	ت	ت	ت	ت	ت	ت	ت	ت	ت
[c]	ݖ		ش	ٽ		ذ	ش			ݖ
[s]	ٽ		ٽ	ٽ	ٽ	ٽ				
[θ]	ث	ث		ج						
[ɟ]	ج	ج	ج		ج	ج		ج		ج
[d͡ʒ]	ج									
[ɟ]	ڃ		ۑ		ڃ	ڃ			ڃ	
[h]	ح	ح	ح	ح						
[x]	خ	خ			خ		خ		خ	خ
[d]	د	د	ط	د	د	د	د	د	د	د
[d̠]	ذ	ذ								
[r]	ر	ر	ر	ر	ر	ر	ر	ر	ر	ر
[z]	ز	ز	ز	ز				ز		
[s]	س	س	س	س	س	س	س	س	س	س
[ʃ]	ش	ش		ش				ش	ش	
[s]	ص	ص								
[d]	ض	ض								
[t]	ط	ط		ط						
[ɗ]	ط		ط							
[z]	ظ	ظ								
[tʃ]	ڟ		ش	ڟ	ت			ݘ		
[ʕ]	ع	ع	ع	ع						
[ɡ]	غ	غ	غ	غ		غ			ف	
[ŋ]	ݝ		ݝ			ٌ ، ً	ݝ	ݝ	ݝ	ݝ
[ᵑɡ]	ن غ		نغ							
[ɡʷ]	ڠ			ڠ						
[ɸ]	ف	ف	ف	ف	ف	ف	ف	ف	ف	ف
[β]	ݡ									
[v]	ڤ									
[q]	ق	ق					ق			ق
[ƙʷ]	ڨ			ڨ						
[k]	ک	ك	ک	ک	ک	ک	ک		ک	ک
[ɡ]	گ		گ	گ			ڭ			گ
[ƙ]	ݤ			ق						
[kʷ]	ݣ			ݣ						
[l]	ل	ل	ل	ل	ل	ل	ل	ل	ل	ل
[m]	م	م	م	م	م	م	م	م	م	م
[n]	ن	ن	ن	ن	ن	ن	ن	ن	عُا	ن
[ɲ]	ݧ		ݧ			ۑ	ݧ		ي	ݧ
[h]	ه	ه	ه	ه	ه	ه	ه	ه	ه	
[w]	و	و	و	و	و	و	و	و	و	و
[j]	ي	ي	ي	ي	ي	ذ	ج	ي		ي
Vowels
[a]	َ	َ	َ	َ	َ	َ	َ		َ	َ
[à]	◌ࣵ									◌ࣵ
[ə]	◌ࣴ				ْ					◌ࣴ
[ɛ]	◌ࣹ								◌̣	◌ࣹ
[e]	◌ࣺ		،ىٰ	◌ٜ ،ىٰ	ی ا̩	ِ	◌̣		◌̣	◌ࣺ
[u]	ُ	ُ	ُ	ُ	ُ	ُ	ُ		َ	ُ
[i]	ِ	ِ	ِ	ِ	ِ	ِ	ِ ،ي		ِ	ِ
[o]	ٝ		ٝ	ُ	واْ ُ	ُ	◌ࣷ		ُ	◌ࣸ
[ɔ]									ُ	

IPA	Script			
IPA	Unicode	Arabic	Swahili	Comorian
[ʔ]	أ	أ	أ	ا
[b]	ب	ب	ب	ب
[ɓ]	ب			ب
[ᵐb]	نْ ب		نْب	
[p]	پ		پ	پ
[pʰ]	پْ ھ		پْھ	
[t]	ت	ت	ٹ	ت
[t̪]	ت		ت	تّ
[tʰ]	ٹ ھ		ٹھ	
[θ]	ث	ث	ث	ث
[ɟ]	ج	ج	ج	
[d͡ʒ]	ج			ج
[ⁿd̥ʒ̊]	نْ ج		نْج	
[tʃ]	چ		چ	شّ
[tʃʰ]	چ ھ		چھ	
[h]	ح	ح	ح	ح
[x]	خ	خ	خ	
[d]	د	د	نْڈ، ڈ، د	
[ⁿd̪]	نْ د		نْد	
[d̠]	ذ	ذ		ذ
[ð]	ذ		ذ، ض	ذ
[r]	ر	ر	ر	ر
[z]	ز	ز	ز	ز
[d͡z]	زّ			زّ
[ʒ]	ژ		ژ	
[s]	س	س	س	س
[t͡s]	سّ			سّ
[ʃ]	ش	ش	ش	ش
[s]	ص	ص		
[d]	ض	ض		
[t]	ط	ط		
[z]	ظ	ظ		
[ʕ]	ع	ع	ع	ئ
[ɡ]	غ	غ		غ
[ɣ]	غ		غ	غ
[ɡ]	ڠ		ڠ	
[ŋ]	ن ݝ		نݝ	
[ᵑɡ]	نْ ڠ		نْڠ	
[ɸ]	ف	ف		
[f]	ف		ف	ف
[β]	ڢ			ڢ
[v]	ڤ		ڤ	ڤ
[q]	ق	ق	ق	
[k]	ک	ك	ک	ک
[kʰ]	ك ھ		كھ	
[l]	ل	ل	ل	ل
[m]	م	م	م	م
[n]	ن	ن	ن	ن
[ɲ]	نّ			نّ
[h]	ه	ه	ه	
[w]	و	و	و	و
[j]	ي	ي	ي	ی
[ɲ]	نْ ي		نْي	
Vowels
[a]		َ	َ	ا
[e]			◌ٖ	‍ ‍ہ‍
[u]	ُ	ُ	ُ	و
[i]	ِ	ِ	ِ	ی
[o]			◌ٗ	ه

== Text Sample ==
Variants of Ajami alphabet with Article 1 of the Universal Declaration of Human Rights.

Language	Ajami	Latin	Notes
Swahili	وَاتُ وٗوتٖ وَمٖزَلِيوَ حُورُ، هَاذِ نَ حَقِ زَاءٗ نِ سَاوَ. وٗوتٖ وَمٖجَلِيوَ عَقِيلِ نَ ضَمِيرِ، هِيڤْيٗ يَپَاسَ وَتٖنْدٖئَانٖ كِنْدُوڠُ.	Watu wote wamezaliwa huru, hadhi na haki zao ni sawa. Wote wamejaliwa akili na dhamiri, hivyo yapasa watendeane kindugu.	
Hausa	سُو دَیْ ؿَنْ أَدَمْ ، أَنَ حَيْڢُوَرْسُ نٜىٰ دُکَ ؿَنْتَتُّ، کُمَ کُووَنٜىٰسُ نَا دَ مُتُنْثِ دَ حَکُوْکِی دَیْدَیْ دَ نَا کُوْوَا؞ سُنَ دَ هَنْکَلِی دَ تُنَانِ سَبُوْدَ حَکَا دُکْ أَبِنْ دَ زَا سُو أَیْکَتَ وَ جُونَ، یَا کَمَاتَ سُیِ شِ أَ ثِکِنْ ؿَنْ أُوَانْثِ؞	Su dai 'yan-adam, ana haifuwarsu ne duka 'yantattu, kuma kowannensu na da mutunci da hakkoki daidai da na kowa.	Hausa writing can be split between the Hafs convention, most popular across the Muslim world, and the Warsh convention which is common across Africa, this sample displays the latter. It has never been recognised or standardised officially in any state. Invented consonants are palatised/labilised phonemes and the implosive b.
Fula	عِنَمَ عَا د‌ٜيذِ ف‌‌ࣾف ݑ‌ࣾتِ، ندِمطِدِ ع‌ٜ ذِبِنَند‌ٜ ت‌ࣾ بَنىْ‌ٜ هَك‌ٜيذِ. ع‌ٜݑ‌ٜ ىْ‌ࣾودِ مِيذ‌ࣾ ع‌ٜ هَكِلَنتَاعَل ع‌ٜت‌ٜ ع‌ٜݑ‌ٜ ݑ‌‌ࣾتِ هُوف‌ࣾ ندِرد‌ٜ ع‌ٜ ند‌ٜر ݑ عِيىُْيُمَاغُ	Innama aadeeji fof poti, ndimɗidi e jibinannde to bannge hakkeeji. Eɓe ngoodi miijo e hakkilantaagal ete eɓe poti huufo ndirde e nder ɓ iynguyummaagu.	There are several different dialects and writing standards of Fulani, but the two most prolific Ajami cultures were the Sokoto Caliphate which also standardised Hausa Ajami, and the Imamate of Fouta Djallon. This sample represents the latter, which added a variety of new symbols.
Mandinka	اَدَمَد‌ِنِنُ ب‌ٜي سُند‌ࣾنَ كَكَن، هُرُيَ دُ، فَبَدٍنَ دُ اَنِ سَرِيَ تَ فَن دُ. هَنكِلِ نِ سُنُم‌ٜ يِ اَلُ ب‌ٜي مَ، اَ كَكَن وُ دُ اَلُ يِ بَكِلٍنَ سِلَ لَتَامَن اَلُ ۑُون ت‌ٜ	Adamadennu bɛɛ sɔdɔnɲa kakan, hɔrɔya dɔ, fabadenɲa dɔ ani sariya ta fan dɔ. Hankili ni sɔnɔmɛ ye alu bɛɛ ma, a kakan wo dɔ alu ye bakelenɲa sila lataaman alu ɲɔɔn tɛ.	
Kanuri	اَدَمغَنَ وُوسُو كَمبىٰ كَتَمبُو يىٰ دَرَيَعَ هَكِوَعَسُون كَلكَليىٰ. هَنكَلعَ نَزَرُعَسُورُو كْزْپكْ يىٰ سُرُو هَل نْمهَرَميبىٰن كَمَزَسُوغَ لىٰتَييِن يىٰ.	Adamgana woso kambe katambo ye daraja-a hakkiwa-ason kalkalye. Hankal-a nazaru-asoro kəzəpkə ye suro hal nəmharamiben kamazasoga letaiyin ye.	
Comorian	وه وانادامو پييا وه وزالوا نا وحورييا نا وساوا واكي وندرو نا وحاكي. وو وپواوا انكيلي نا ورامبوزي حاييزو ييلازيمو واروالييان‍ہ‍ حازيتر‍ہ‍ ندوا نا فيكيرا زاكي ونانيا.	Wo wanadamu piya wo uzalwa na uhuriya na usawa waki undru na uhaki. Wo upwawa ankili na urambuzi hayizo yilazimu warwaliyane hazitrendwa na fikira zaki unanya.	This sample uses the standardised Comorian Ajami with the Shingazija language, the only one translated into the UDHR. It is the only Ajami script to use no diacritics in standard usage, leaving no room for it.

== See also ==
- Wolofal script
- Wadaad's writing
- Fula alphabets#Arabic (Ajami) alphabet
- Swahili Ajami
- Mandinka language#Orthography
- Maore dialect#Maore Arabic Alphabet
- Susu language#Orthography
- Aljamiado
- Jawi script
- Perso-Arabic script
- Timbuktu Manuscripts
- Arwi
