= Quezeliantha =

Scientific classification
- Kingdom: Plantae
- Clade: Tracheophytes
- Clade: Angiosperms
- Clade: Eudicots
- Clade: Rosids
- Order: Brassicales
- Family: Brassicaceae
- Genus: Quezeliantha; H.Scholz
- Species: Q. tibestica

Binomial name
- Quezeliantha tibestica (H.Scholz) H.Scholz

Synonyms
- Quezelia H.Scholz; Quezelia tibestica H.Scholz

Species of flowering plant

Quezeliantha is a monotypic genus of flowering plants belonging to the family Brassicaceae. It only contains one known species, Quezeliantha tibestica, a biennial endemic to the northwestern Tibesti Mountains in the central Sahara of northern Chad.

The genus name of Quezeliantha is in honour of Pierre Ambrunaz Quézel (1926–2015), a French doctor, botanist and ecologist. The Latin specific epithet of tibestica refers to the Tibesti Mountains. Both the genus and the species were first described and published in Taxon Vol.31 on page 558 in 1982.
