= Tarso Yega =

Tibesti stratovolcano

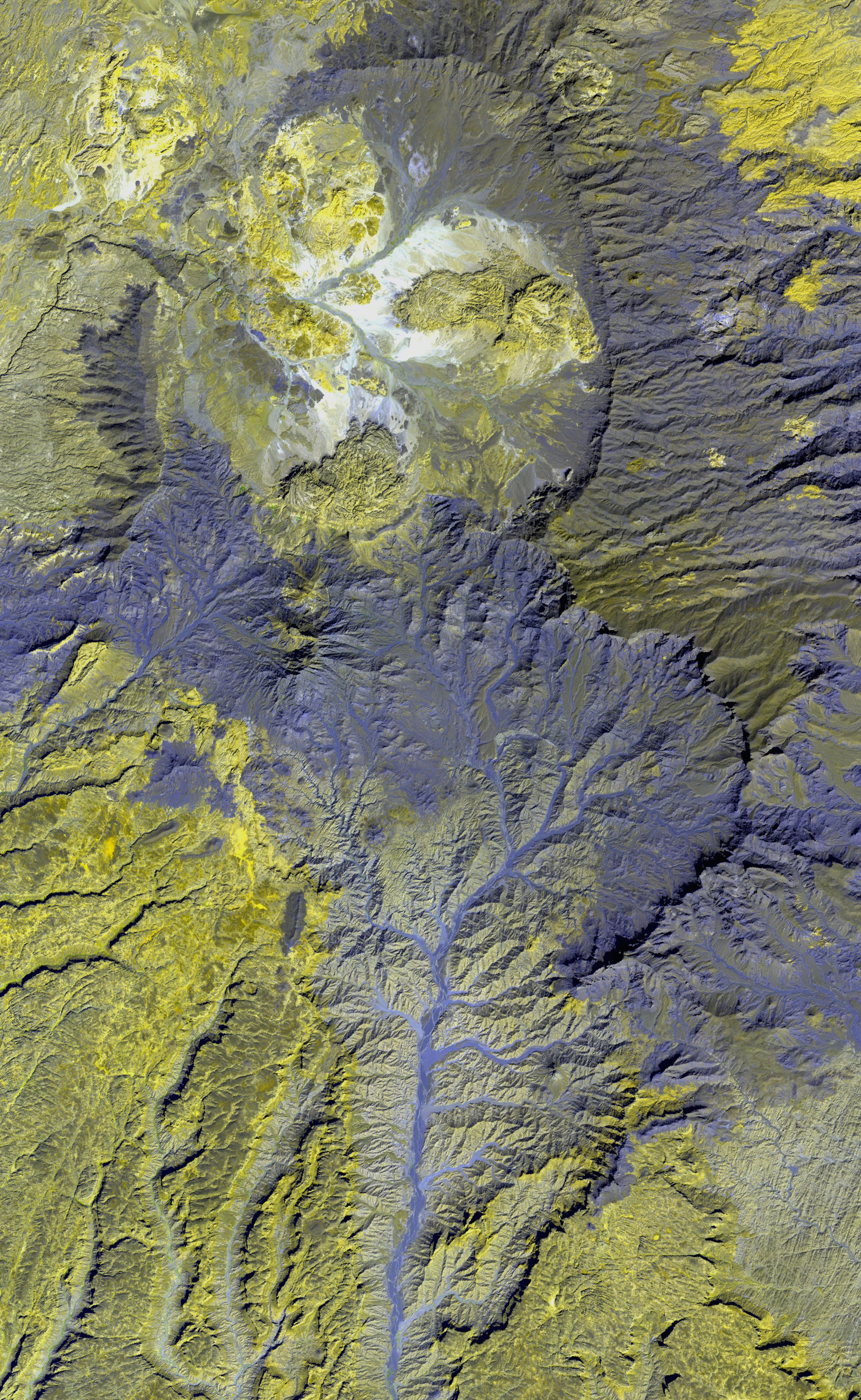
- ASTER image of Tarso Yega, at the top

Highest point
- Coordinates: 20.66°N 17.42°E

Geography
- Location within Chad

Tarso Yega ("well", tedaga) is a stratovolcano in Tibesti, with a summit caldera that is 19 by 20 kilometres (12 mi × 12 mi) wide and 300 metres (980 ft) deep. The summit of the volcano reaches a height of 2,972 metres (9,751 ft), and its caldera is the largest caldera of the Tibesti. Neighbouring volcanoes include Doudriki east, Ehi Dosoatou south and Ehi Fodoboro southwest of the caldera. The Enneri Yega river drains the caldera westward and then south, before joining the Enneri Debarsar; in the past (Holocene) the rivers reached Lake Chad and lakes formed in Tarso Yega.

The history of the volcano is characterized by the emission of tephras, with the downsagging of the caldera floor generating a depression. Basaltic vents and lava domes were emplaced within this caldera, and an intrusion named Ehi Yodéï developed 3 kilometres (1.9 mi) farther south.

The caldera is heavily eroded, with almost the entire southern side eroded away, and the younger Voon ignimbrite has been emplaced inside of it; it belongs to a different volcano, Tarso Voon. Humans have used the caldera for irrigated agriculture.
