= Tarso Ahon =

- Location within Chad

Highest point
- Elevation: 3,325 m (10,909 ft)
- Coordinates: 20.539°N 18.29°E

Tarso Ahon is a Pleistocene volcano in Tibesti, north of Emi Koussi from which it is separated by deep gorges. It covers a surface of about 50 by 60 kilometres (31 mi × 37 mi) and is a so-called volcanic plateau with three summits: Arken Ahon, Dondomé, Tarso Ahon and Tarso Mohi. However, contrary to its plateau-like appearance the basaltic surfaces of Tarso Ahon are difficult to access and steep. Tarso Ahon has erupted andesite, rhyolite and similar magmas, and more recently basalts which form lava flows.
