= Tibesti Mountains =

Mountain range in the Sahara

Tibesti
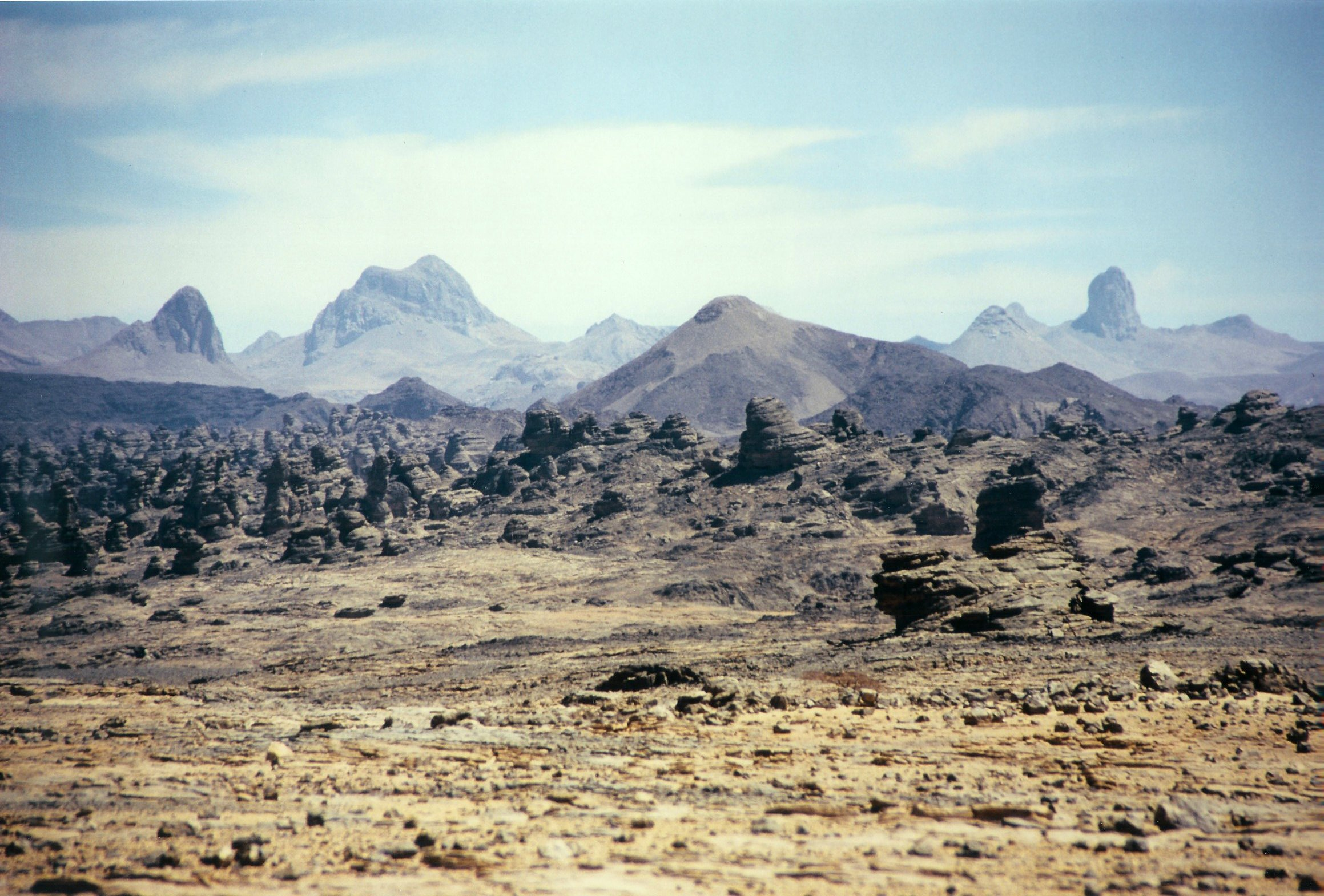
- The Tibesti east of Bardaï

Highest point
- Peak: Emi Koussi
- Elevation: 3,415 m (11,204 ft)
- Coordinates: 19°47′33″N 18°32′47″E

Dimensions
- Length: 480 km (300 mi)
- Width: 350 km (220 mi)
- Area: 100,000 km^{2} (39,000 mi^{2})

Geography
- Location within Chad
- Countries: Chad; Libya
- Range coordinates: 20°46′51″N 18°02′59″E

Geology
- Rock age: Oligocene
- Rock types: Andesite; Basalt; Basanite; Dacite; Ignimbrite; Pumice; Rhyolite; Trachyandesite; Trachyte

The Tibesti Mountains (Arabic: جبال تيبستي, romanised: Jibāl Tibistī) are a mountain range in the central Sahara, primarily located in the extreme north of Chad, with a small portion located in southern Libya. The highest peak in the range, Emi Koussi, lies to the south at a height of 3,415 meters (11,204 ft) and is the highest point in both Chad and the Sahara. Bikku Bitti, the highest peak in Libya, is located in the north of the range. The central third of the Tibesti is of volcanic origin and consists of five volcanoes topped by large depressions: Emi Koussi, Tarso Toon, Tarso Voon, Tarso Yega and Toussidé. Major lava flows have formed vast plateaus that overlie Paleozoic sandstone. The volcanic activity was the result of a continental hotspot that arose during the Oligocene and continued in some places until the Holocene, creating fumaroles, hot springs, mud pools and deposits of natron and sulfur. Erosion has shaped volcanic spires and carved an extensive network of canyons through which run rivers subject to highly irregular flows that are rapidly lost to the desert sands.

Tibesti, which means "place where the mountain people live", is the domain of the Toubou people. The Toubou live mainly along the wadis, on rare oases where palm trees and limited grains grow. They harness the water that collects in gueltas, the supply of which is highly variable from year-to-year and decade-to-decade. The plateaus are used to graze livestock in the winter and harvest grain in the summer. Temperatures are high, although the altitude ensures that the range is cooler than the surrounding desert. The Toubou, who were settled in the range by the 5th century BC, adapted to these conditions and turned the range into a large natural fortress. They arrived in several waves, taking refuge in times of conflict and dispersing in times of prosperity, although not without intense internal hostility at times.

The Toubou came into contact with the Carthaginians, Berbers, Tuaregs, Ottomans and the Arabs, as well as the French colonists who first entered the range in 1914 and took control of the area in 1929. The independent spirit of the Toubou and the geopolitics of the region has complicated the exploration of the range as well as the ascent of its peaks. Tensions continued after Chad and Libya gained independence in the mid-20th century, with hostage-taking and armed struggles occurring amid disputes over the allocation of natural resources. The geopolitical situation and the lack of infrastructure has hampered the development of tourism.

The Saharomontane flora and fauna, which include the rhim gazelle and Barbary sheep, have adapted to the mountains, yet the climate has not always been as harsh. Greater biodiversity existed in the past, as evidenced by scenes portrayed in rock and parietal art found throughout the range, which date back several millennia, even before the arrival of the Toubou. The isolation of the Tibesti has sparked the cultural imagination in both art and literature.

== Toponymy ==
The Tibesti Mountains are named for the Toubou people, also written Tibu or Tubu, that inhabit the area. In the Kanuri language, tu means "rocks" or "mountain" and bu means "a person" or "dweller," and thus Toubou roughly translates to "people of the mountains" (Note: An alternative theory holds that the name Toubou means "bird," because members of the Toubou communicate by whistling or because they run fast.) and Tibesti to the "place where the mountain people live".

Most of the mountain names are derived from Arabic as well as the Tedaga and Dazaga languages. The term ehi precedes the names of peaks and rocky hills, emi precedes those of larger mountains, and tarso precedes high plateaus and gently-sloping mountainsides. For example, the Ehi Mousgou is a 2,849-meter (9,347 ft) stratovolcano near Tarso Voon. The name Toussidé means "that which killed the Tou," as in the Toubou, reflecting the danger of the still active volcano. The name of Bardaï, the principal town in the range, means "cold" in Chadian Arabic. (Note: Temperatures in the Tibesti can drop to −10 °C (14 °F).) In the Tedaga language, the town is known as Goumodi, which means "red pass," signifying the color of the mountains at dusk.

== Geography ==
=== Location ===
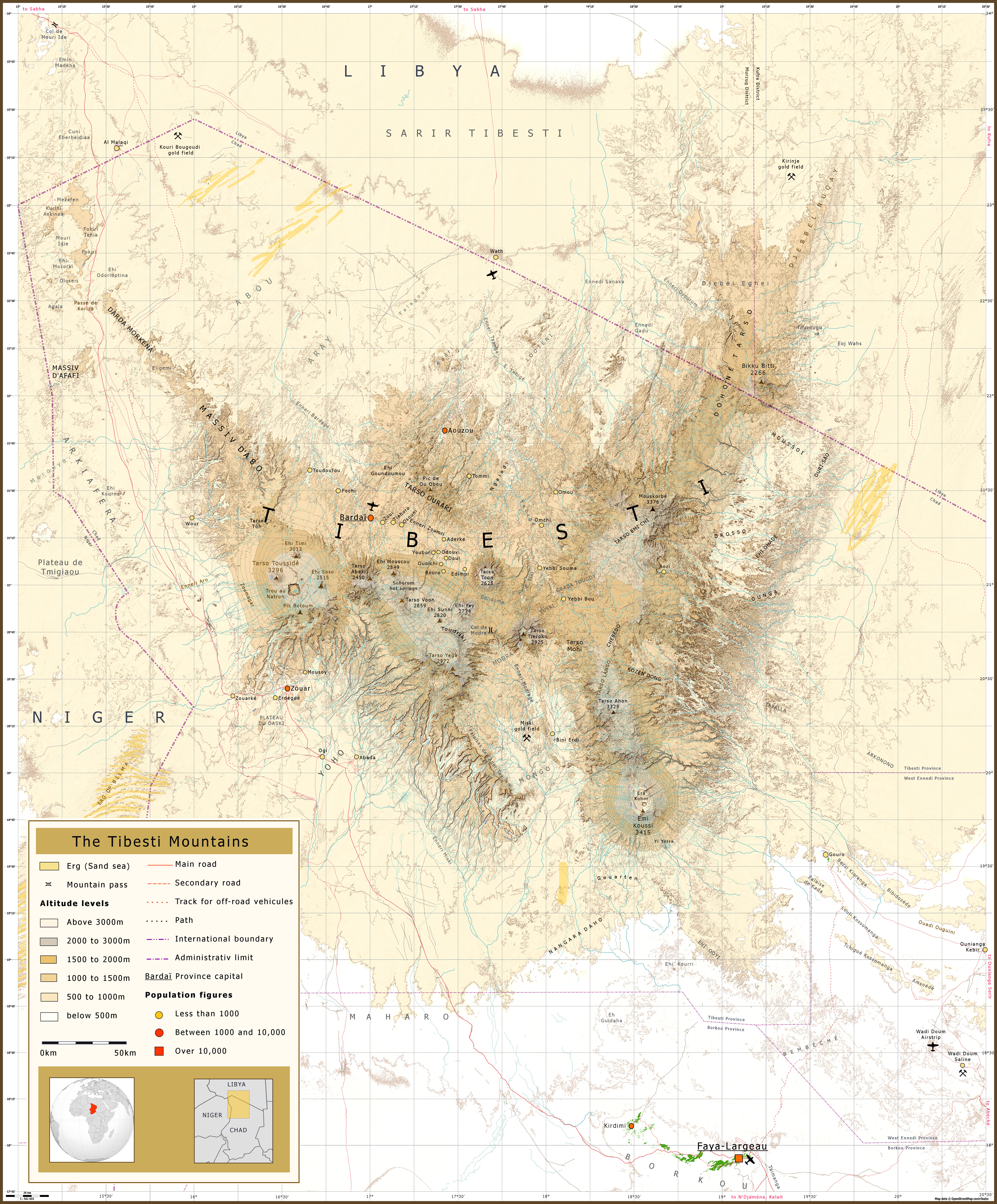
Topographic map of the Tibesti mountains

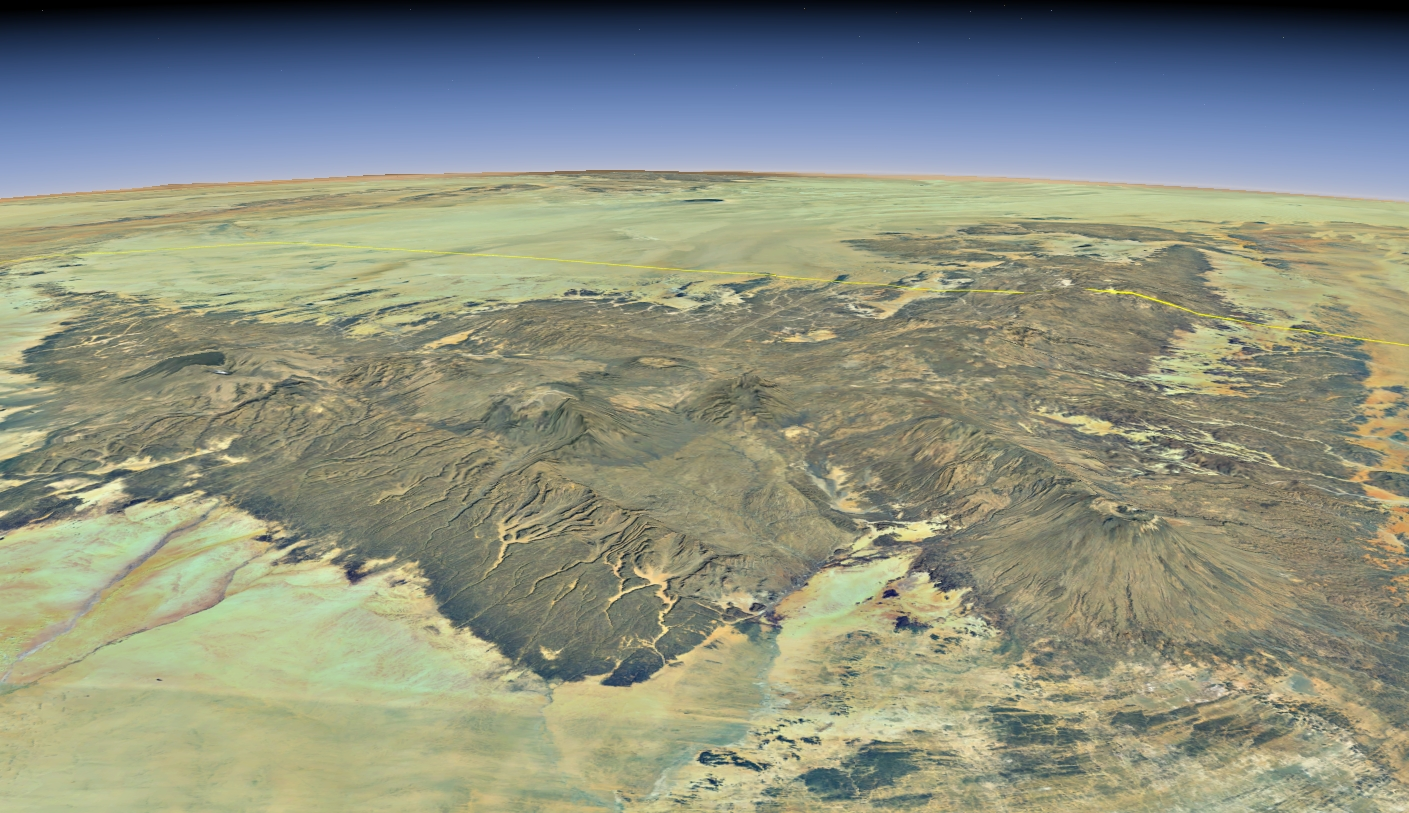
False-color, exaggerated-relief satellite image of the Tibesti Mountains viewed from the south

The mountains lie on the border between Chad and Libya, straddling the Chadian region of Tibesti and the Libyan districts of Murzuq and Kufra, around 1,000 kilometers (620 mi) north of N'djamena and 1,500 kilometers (930 mi) south-southeast of Tripoli. The range is adjacent to Niger and located approximately halfway between the Gulf of Sidra and Lake Chad, just south of the Tropic of Cancer. The East African Rift is 1,900 km (1,200 mi) to the east and the Cameroon line lies 1,800 km (1,100 mi) to the southwest.

The range is 480 km (300 mi) in length, 350 km (220 mi) in width, and spans 100,000 km^{2} (39,000 sq mi). It draws a large triangle with sides of 400 km (250 mi) and vertices facing south, northwest and northeast in the heart of the Sahara, making it the largest mountain range of the desert.

=== Topography ===
The highest peak in the Tibesti Mountains, as well as the highest point in Chad and the Sahara Desert, is the 3,415-meter (11,204 ft) Emi Koussi, located at the southern end of the range. Other prominent peaks include Pic Toussidé (Note: Pic Toussidé is the highest point on the high plateau Tarso Toussidé.) at 3,296 m (10,814 ft) and the 3,012-meter (9,882 ft) Timi on its western side, the 2,972-meter (9,751 ft) Tarso Yega, the 2,925-meter (9,596 ft) Tarso Tieroko, the 2,849-meter (9,347 ft) Ehi Mousgou, the 2,845-meter (9,334 ft) Tarso Voon, the 2,820-meter (9,250 ft) Ehi Sunni, and the 2,774-meter (9,101 ft) Ehi Yéy near the center of the range. The 3,325-meter (10,909 ft) high Tarso Ahon rises north of Emi Koussi. The 3,376-meter (11,076 ft) Mouskorbé is a peak notable for its height in the northeastern part of the mountain range. The 2,266-meter (7,434 ft) Bikku Bitti, the highest point in Libya, is nearby, on the other side of the border. The average elevation of the Tibesti Mountains is about 2,000 m (6,600 ft); sixty percent of its area exceeds 1,500 m (4,900 ft) in elevation.

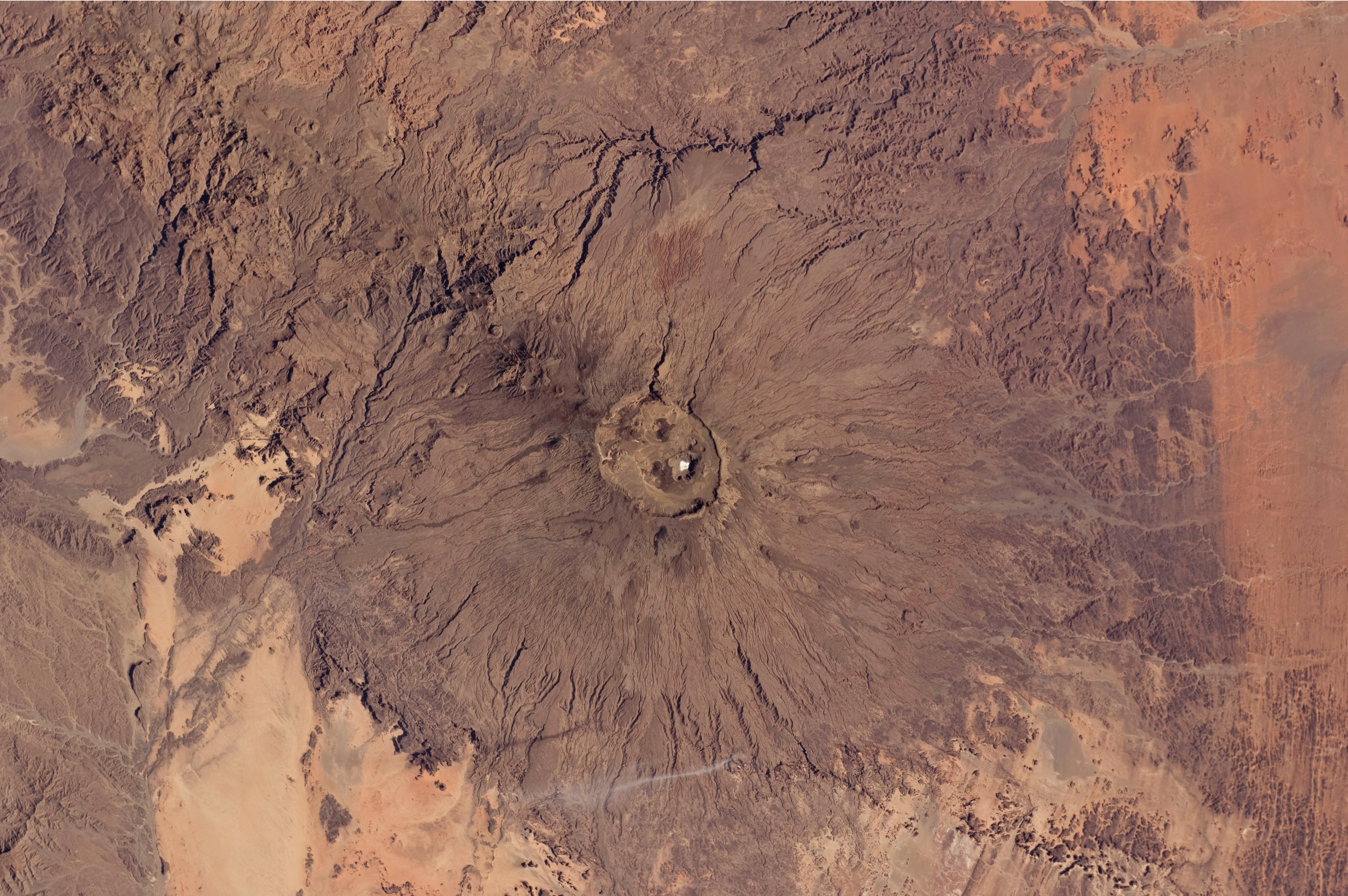
Satellite image of Emi Koussi

The range includes five shield volcanoes with broad bases whose diameter can reach 80 km (50 mi): Emi Koussi; Tarso Toon, which rises 2,575 m (8,448 ft) above sea level; Tarso Voon; Tarso Yega; and Tarso Toussidé, which culminates in the peak of the same name. Several of these peaks are topped with large calderas. Tarso Yega has the largest caldera, with a diameter of 19 to 20 km (12 to 12 mi) and a depth of approximately 300 m (980 ft), while Tarso Voon has the deepest caldera, with a depth of approximately 1,000 m (3,300 ft) and a diameter of 12 to 13 km (7.5 to 8.1 mi). They are complemented by four large lava dome complexes, 1,300 to 2,000 m (4,300 to 6,600 ft) high and several km wide, all located in the central part of the mountain range: Tarso Tieroko; Ehi Yéy; Ehi Mousgou; and Tarso Abeki, which rises to 2,691 m (8,829 ft) above sea level. These volcanic complexes are now considered inactive, but according to the Smithsonian Institution were active during the Holocene. Tarso Toussidé is an active volcano that has spewed lava over the past two millennia. Gases escaping from fumaroles on Toussidé are visible when evaporation is low. The volcano's crater, Trou au Natron, is 8 km (5.0 mi) in diameter and 768 m (2,520 ft) deep. On the northwest side of Tarso Voon is the Soborom geothermal field, which contains mud pools and fumaroles that vent sulfuric acid. The sulfur has stained the surrounding soil bright colors. Fumaroles are also present at the Yi Yerra hot springs on Emi Koussi. Tarso Tôh was an active volcano in the early Holocene. The volcanic area of the Tibesti Mountains is located entirely in Chad; it covers about a third of the total area of the Tibesti Mountains and is responsible for between 5,000 and 6,000 km^{3} (1,200 and 1,400 cu mi) of rock.

The other four shield volcanoes of the Tibesti Mountains

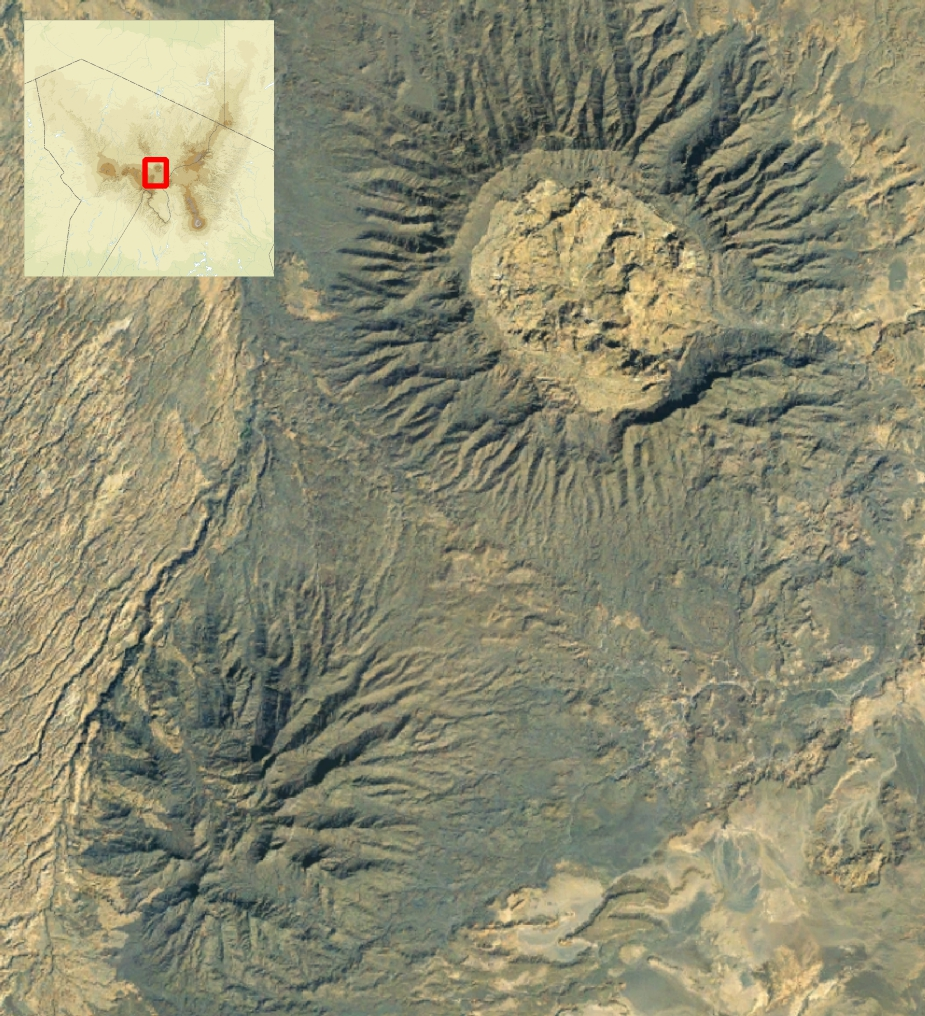
Satellite image of Tarso Toon (top right) and Ehi Yéy (bottom left)

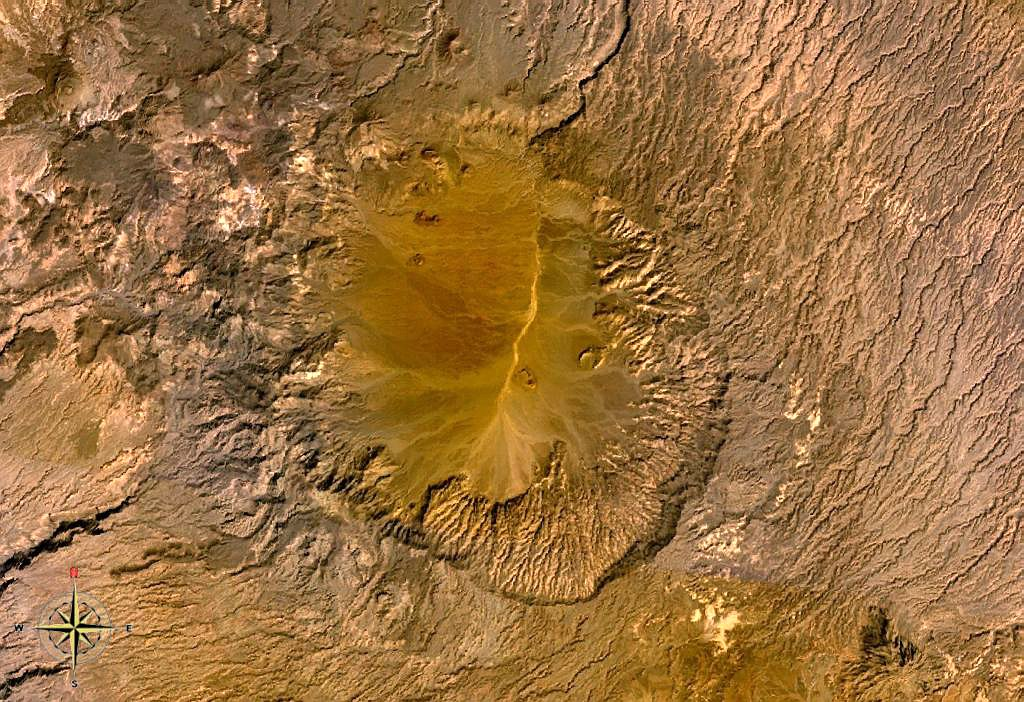
Satellite image of Tarso Voon

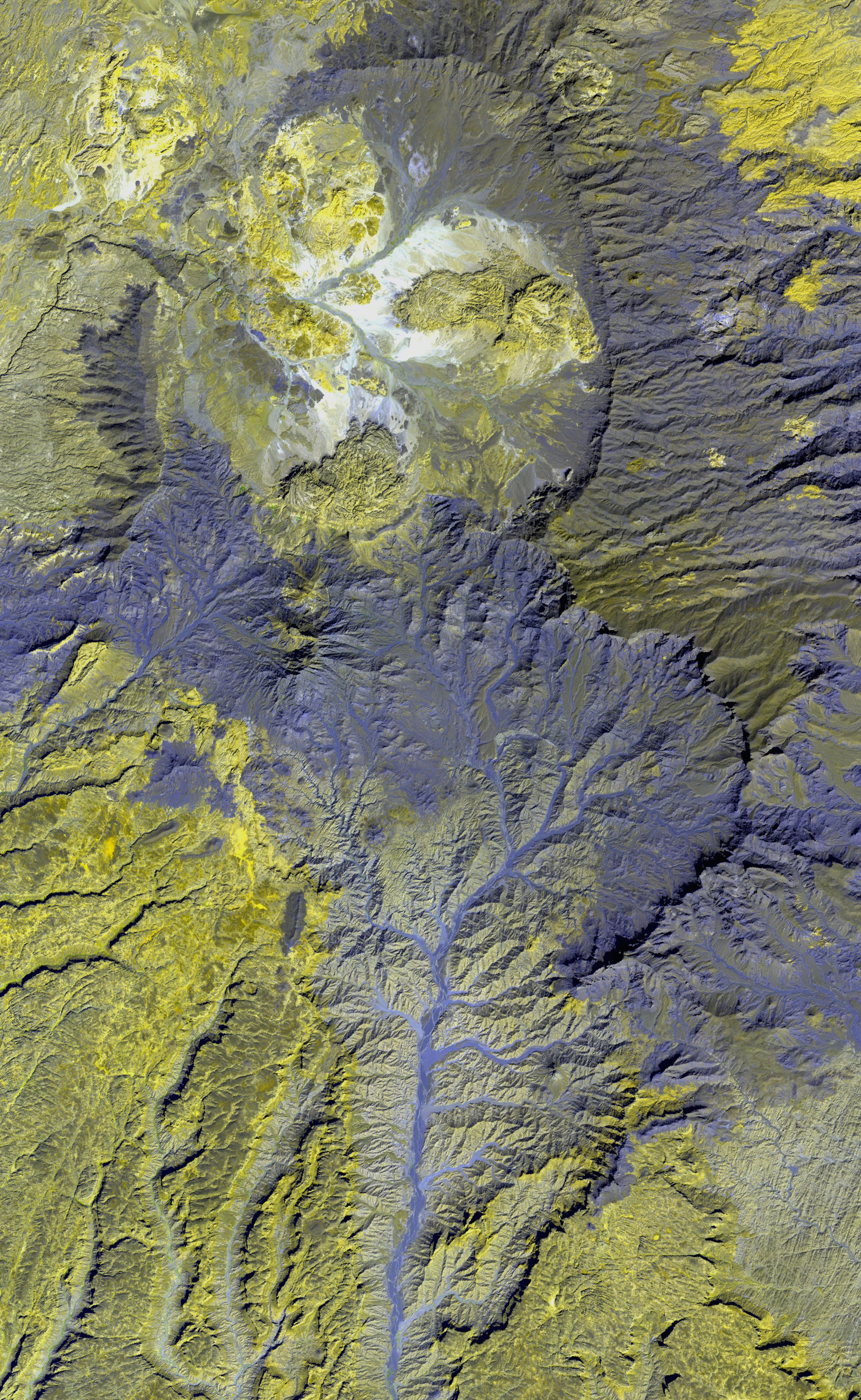
False-color satellite image of Tarso Yega (top)

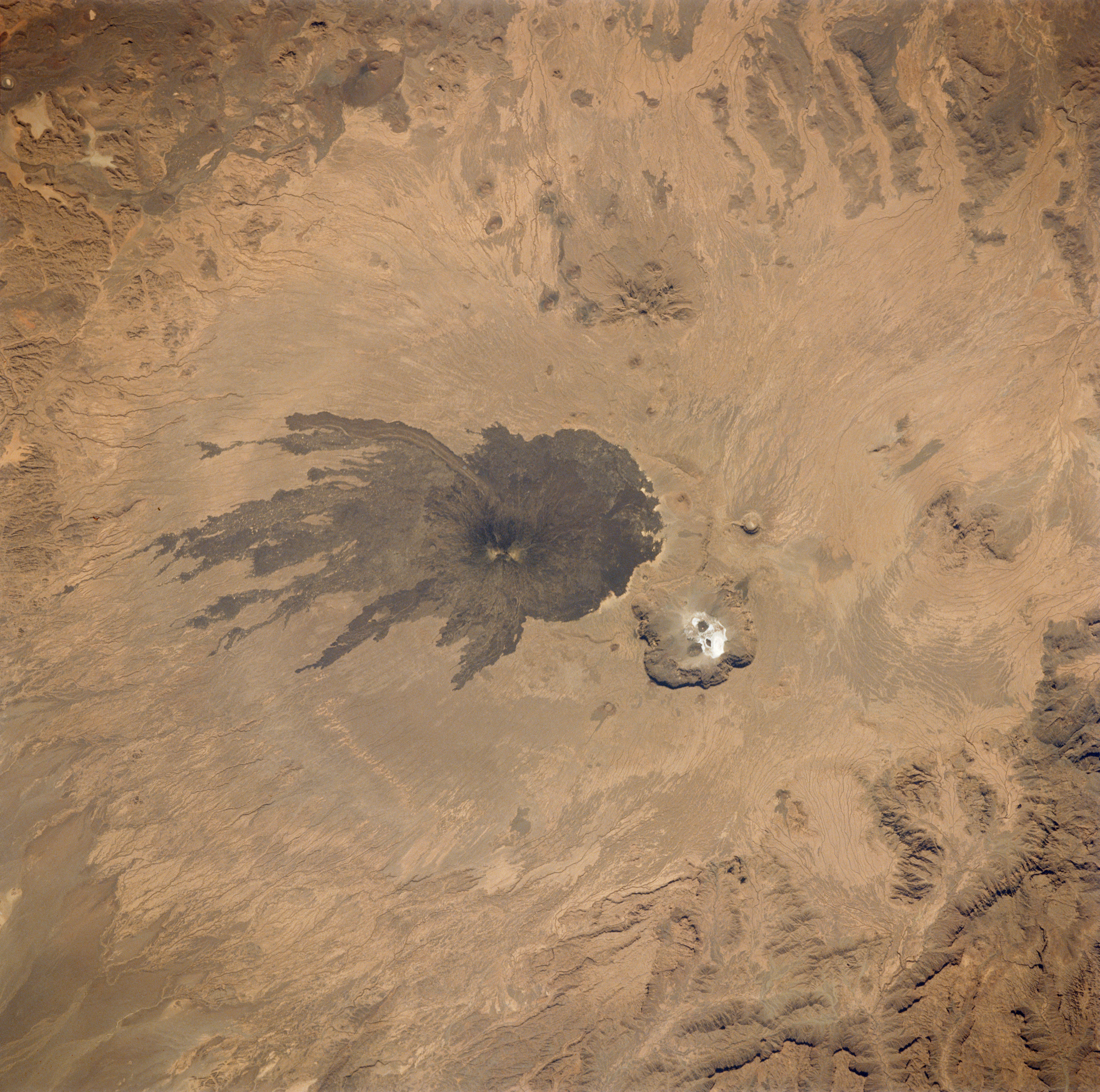
Satellite image of Tarso Toussidé showing Pic Toussidé (the center of the dark spot) and Trou au Natron crater (bottom right)

The rest of the Tibesti Mountains consists of volcanic plateaus (tarsos), located between 1,000 and 2,800 m (3,300 and 9,200 ft) elevation, as well as lava fields and ejecta deposits. The plateaus are larger and more numerous in the east: the 7,700 km^{2} (3,000 sq mi) Tarso Emi Chi, the 6,500 km^{2} (2,500 sq mi) Tarso Aozi, the 3,000 km^{2} (1,200 sq mi) Tarso Ahon to the north of Emi Koussi, and the 1,200 km^{2} (460 sq mi) Tarso Mohi. In the center is Tarso Ourari at about 700 km^{2} (270 sq mi). To the west, in the vicinity of Tarso Toussidé, is the aforementioned Tarso Tôh, a small plateau at just 490 km^{2} (190 sq mi), and the even smaller Tarso Tamertiou at 98 km^{2} (38 sq mi). The plateaus are strewn with volcanic spires and are separated by canyons that have been formed by the irregular flow of wadis. After often-violent rains, they see the formation of ephemeral streams and flora. The southern, southwestern and eastern slopes of the mountain range have a gentle rise, while the northern slope of the range is a cliff overlooking the vast Libyan desert pavement known as the Serir Tibesti.

=== Hydrology ===
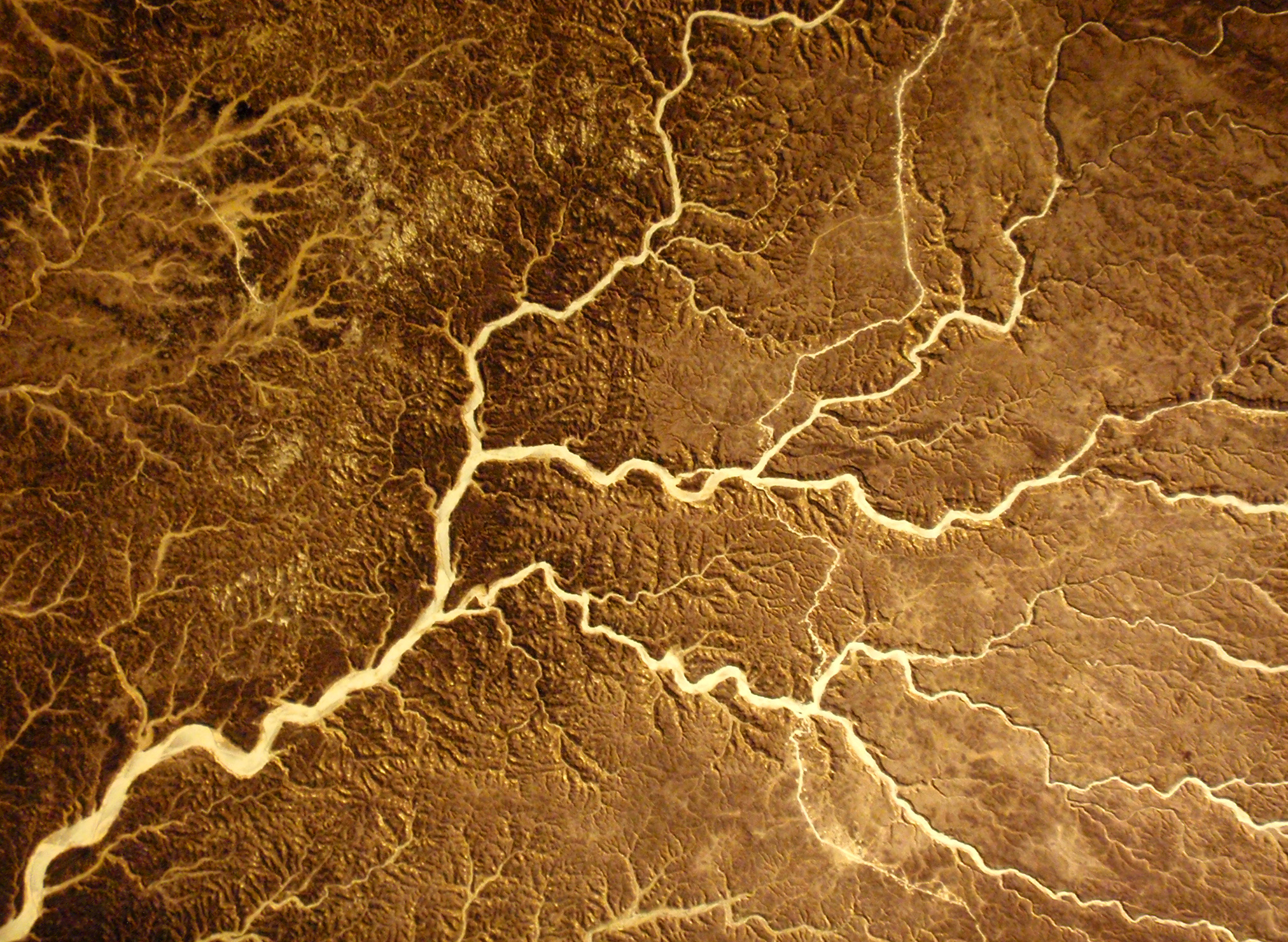
Satellite image of Tibesti wadis (enneris)

Five rivers in the northern half of the Tibesti Mountains flow to Libya, while the southern half belongs to the endorheic basin of Lake Chad. However, none of the rivers travel long distances, as the water evaporates in the desert heat or seeps into the ground, although the latter may flow great distances through subterranean aquifers.

The wadis in the Tibesti are called enneris. The water mainly originates from the storms that periodically rage over the mountains. Their flow is highly variable. For example, the largest wadi, named Bardagué (or Enneri Zoumeri on its upstream portion) and located in the northern part of the range, recorded a flow of 425 m^{3}/s (15,000 cu ft/s) in 1954, yet over the next nine years it experienced four years of total drought, four years of flow less than 5 m^{3}/s (180 cu ft/s) and one year where three different flow rates were measured: 4, 9 and 32 m^{3}/s (140, 320 and 1,130 cu ft/s).

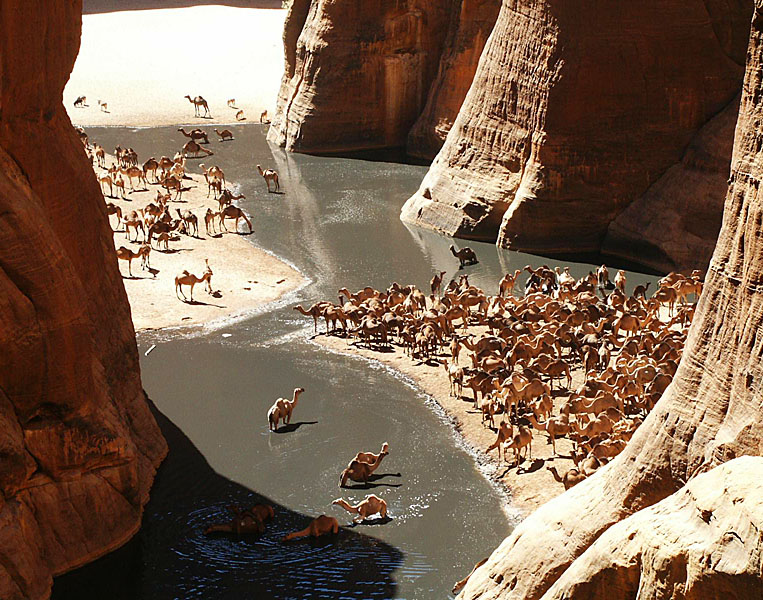
A guelta on the Ennedi Plateau, 500 km (300 mi) southeast of the Tibesti

Other major rivers cut into the mountains: the Enneri Yebige flows northward until its riverbed disappears on the Serir Tibesti, while Enneri Touaoul joins the south-flowing Enneri Ke to form Enneri Miski, which then disappears in the plains of Borkou. Their basins are separated by an 1,800-meter (5,900 ft) high watershed that runs from Tarso Tieroko in the west to Tarso Mohi in the east. The Enneri Tijitinga is the longest wadi in the range, flowing some 400 km (250 mi) southward. It forms in the west of the range and peters out in the Bodélé Depression, as does Enneri Miski a little further to the east, along with other wadis such as the Enneri Korom and Enneri Aouei. Several rivers flow radially on the southern slopes of the Emi Koussi before seeping into the sands of Borkou and then reemerging at escarpments up to 400 km (250 mi) south of the summit, near the Ennedi Plateau.

At the bottom of many canyons are gueltas, wetlands that accumulate water mainly during storms. Above 2,000 m (6,600 ft), enneri beds sometimes contain sequential pools of water that remain largely unexplored. The water is replenished several times a year during flooding, and salinity levels are low. The Mare de Zoui is a small permanent body of water 600 m (2,000 ft) above sea level, located in the northern part of the mountains in the wadi of the Enneri Bardagué, 10 km (6.2 mi) east of Bardaï. Supplied by sources upstream of the wadi, in heavy rains it overflows and spills into small wetlands.

The Yi Yerra hot springs is located on the southern flank of Emi Koussi at about 850 m (2,800 ft) elevation. Water emerges from the springs at 37 °C (99 °F). A dozen hot springs are also located at the Soborom geothermal field on the northwest side of Tarso Voon, where water emerges at temperatures ranging between 22 and 88 °C (72 and 190 °F).

=== Geology ===
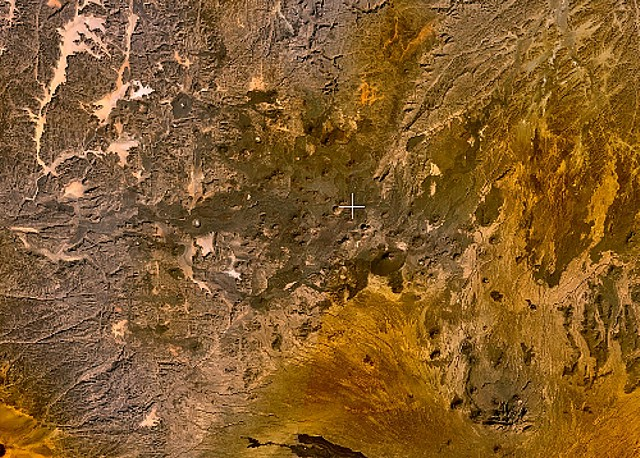
Satellite image of the volcanic field on Tarso Tôh, which includes 150 cinder cones, two maars and several basalt lava channels

The Tibesti Mountains are a large area of tectonic uplift that, according to contemporary theory, resulted from a mantle plume in the craton of the African Plate lithosphere, which is about 130 to 140 km (81 to 87 mi) thick. This tectonic uplift may have been accompanied by the opening, and subsequent closure via subduction, of a rift zone. A system of regional faults, although partially obscured by the volcanic product, has two distinct orientations: a NNE-SSW alignment that could be an extension of Cameroon line, and a NW-SE alignment that could extend to the Great Rift Valley; however, the relationship between these fault systems has not been conclusively demonstrated.

The basement of the Tibesti is composed of granite, diorite and schist, one of six exposures of Precambrian crystalline rock in North Africa. These are overlaid by sandstone of the Paleozoic era, while the peaks consist of volcanic rock. The continental hotspot activity began as early as the Oligocene, although most of the volcanic rock dates from the Lower Miocene to the Pleistocene and, in places, to the Holocene. Due to the comparatively slow movement of the African Plate—roughly between 0 and 20 mm (0 and 0.8 in) per year since the Lower Miocene—there is no relationship between the age of the volcanoes and their dimensions, geographic distribution or alignment, in contrast to hotspots such as the Hawaiian–Emperor and Cook-Austral seamount chains. This phenomenon is also seen in Martian volcanoes, particularly Elysium Mons. Early volcanic activity created trap basalt formations that extend tens of kilometers and stack up to 300 m (1,000 ft) thick. Basanite and andesite are also found in the volcanic layer. More recently in geologic time, volcanic activity has deposited dacite, rhyolite and ignimbrite, as well as trachyte and trachyandesite. This trend towards the production of more felsic, viscous lavas could be a sign of a waning mantle plume.

=== Geomorphology ===
Animation showing the phases of volcanic activity in the Tibesti Mountains

Volcanic activity in the Tibesti took place in several phases. In the first phase, uplift and extension of the Precambrian basement occurred in the central area. The first structure to be formed was probably Tarso Abeki, followed by Tarso Tamertiou, Tarso Tieroko, Tarso Yega, Tarso Toon and Ehi Yéy. The product of this early volcanic activity has been completely obscured by later eruptions. In the second phase, the volcanic activity moved north and east, forming Tarso Ourari and the ignimbrite bases of the vast tarsos, as well as Emi Koussi to the southeast. Thereafter, during the third phase, the outpouring of lava and ejecta deposits increased from Tarso Yega, Tarso Toon, Tarso Tieroko and Ehi Yéy; the collapse of these structures formed the first calderas. This phase also saw the formation of the Bounaï lava dome and Tarso Voon. To the east, the lava flows formed the large plateaus of Tarso Emi Chi, Tarso Ahon and Tarso Mohi. Emi Koussi increased in height. The fourth phase saw the formation of Tarso Toussidé and the lava flows of Tarso Tôh in the west, the collapse of the caldera on the summit of Tarso Voon and associated ejecta deposits in the center, and the decline in lava production in the east, with the exception of Emi Koussi, which continued to rise. In the fifth phase, volcanic activity became much more localized and lava production continued to wane. Calderas formed on top of Tarso Toussidé and Emi Koussi, and the lava domes Ehi Sosso and Ehi Mousgou appeared. Finally, in the sixth phase, Pic Toussidé formed on the western rim of several pre-Trou au Natron calderas, along with new lava flows, including Timi on the northern slope of Tarso Toussidé. With scarce time for erosion, these lava flows have a dark, youthful appearance.

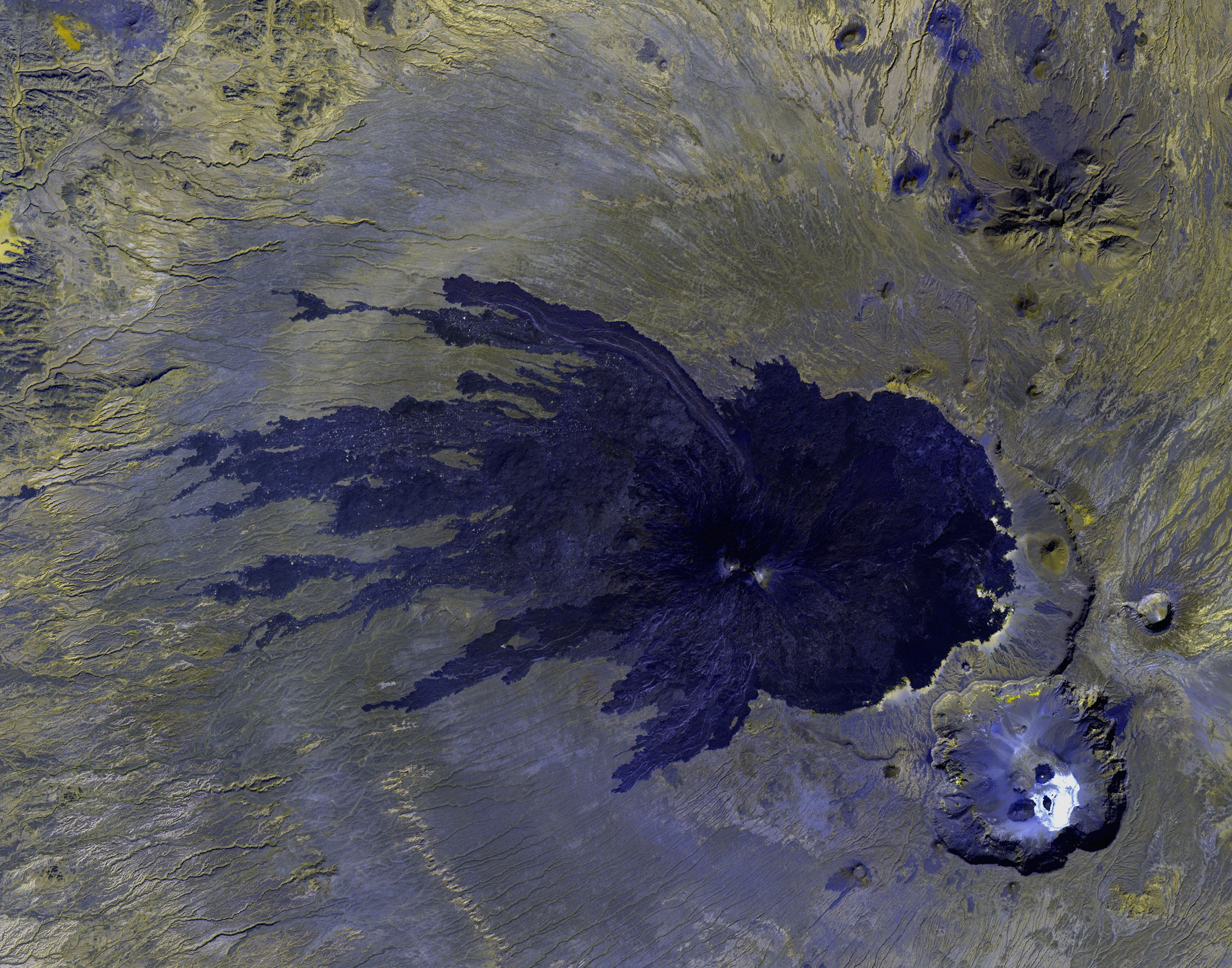
Satellite image of the more recent lava rock, in black, with Toussidé volcano (center) and the Trou au Natron crater (bottom right)

The Trou au Natron and Doon Kidimi craters have formed even more recently, with the former dissecting the earlier Toussidé calderas. Lava flows, minor pyroclastic deposits, and the appearance of small cinder cones, and the formation of the Era Kohor crater are the most recent volcanic activities on Emi Koussi. Presently, there are reports of volcanic activity in various parts of the massif, including hot springs at the Soborom geothermal field and fumaroles on Tarso Voon, Yi Yerra near Emi Koussi and Pic Toussidé. Carbonate deposits in the Trou au Natron and Era Kohor craters are also representative of more recent volcanic activity.

The study of fluvial terraces has revealed coarse sand and gravel alternating with terraces of silt, clay and fine sand. This alternation highlights repeated changes in the dominant fluvial or wind patterns in the valleys of Tibesti during the Quaternary Period. The phases of erosion and sendimentation are indicative of the climate alternating between dry and wet conditions, the latter of which fostered vegetation in the Tibesti that was likely significantly denser than that which exists today. (Note: It is unlikely that the earlier vegetation was significantly qualitatively different from that which exists today, although Mediterranean flora would have been somewhat more common.) Furthermore, the discovery of calcified charophyta (particularly of the family Characeae) and gastropod fossils in Trou au Natron indicates the presence of a lake at least 300 m (1,000 ft) deep during the Late Pleistocene. These phenomena are associated with various changes in climate, most notably during the last glacial maximum, which increased precipitation and reduced evaporation due to lower temperatures. In fact, the Tibesti supplied a considerable amount of water to the Paleolake Chad until the 5th millennium BC.

=== Climate ===
The Tibesti climate is substantially less dry than that of the surrounding Sahara Desert, but rainfall events are highly variable from year to year. In the south of the range, this variation is largely due to oscillations of the Intertropical Convergence Zone (ITCZ), which steadily moves northward toward northern Chad from November until August, accompanied by humid monsoonal air. Normally, the ITCZ repels the Harmattan, a dry trade wind that blows west or southwest from the Sahara Desert and brings rainfall to southern Tibesti. However, sometimes the front retires early, before reaching the Tibesti, leaving its southern portion dry. In the arid northern Tibesti, where the monsoon has little influence, storms are caused by episodic Sahara-Sudanese weather systems. For example, between 1957 and 1968, Bardaï, on the northern flank of the range, saw an average of 12 mm (0.47 in) of precipitation annually, yet some years were completely dry while others saw 60 mm (2.4 in) of rainfall. In general, the range receives less than 20 mm (0.79 in) of rainfall per year. However, precipitation increases with altitude; for example Trou au Natron 2,250 m (7,380 ft) receives 126 mm (5.0 in) annually. When the rainfall coincides with low temperatures, it can fall as snow. This occurs, on average, once every seven years.

The average monthly maximum temperature is 28 °C (83 °F) in the central Tibesti Mountains, while the average monthly minimum is 12 °C (53 °F). Lows of −10 °C (14 °F) are not uncommon. Bardaï, located 1,020 m (3,350 ft) above sea level, experiences average temperatures ranging between 4.6 and 23.7 °C (40.3 and 74.7 °F) in January, between 14.4 and 34 °C (57.9 and 93.2 °F) in April, and between 19.4 and 36.7 °C (66.9 and 98.1 °F) in August. The combination of high temperatures and low humidity results in potentially high evaporation rates, ranging from 129 mm (5 in) in January to 254 mm (10 in) in May, parching many enneris before they can exit the mountain range.

Climate data for the central Tibesti Mountains (21°15′N 17°45′E), approximately 1,200 m (3,900 ft) elevation, 1901–2009
Month	Jan	Feb	Mar	Apr	May	Jun	Jul	Aug	Sep	Oct	Nov	Dec	Year
Mean daily maximum °C (°F)	18.1 (64.5)	21 (70)	25 (77)	29.8 (85.7)	34.2 (93.5)	36.2 (97.2)	35.7 (96.3)	34 (94)	33.1 (91.5)	28.6 (83.5)	22.7 (72.9)	18.8 (65.8)	28.1 (82.7)
Daily mean °C (°F)	10.3 (50.5)	12.8 (55.1)	16.5 (61.7)	21 (70)	25.3 (77.6)	27.3 (81.2)	27 (81)	26.5 (79.7)	25.1 (77.1)	20.7 (69.3)	15.1 (59.1)	11.6 (52.8)	19.9 (67.9)
Mean daily minimum °C (°F)	2.6 (36.7)	4.6 (40.3)	8.1 (46.5)	12.4 (54.3)	16.5 (61.7)	18.4 (65.1)	18.8 (65.8)	18.6 (65.5)	17.1 (62.8)	12.9 (55.3)	7.4 (45.4)	4.3 (39.7)	11.8 (53.3)
Source 1: Global Species
Source 2: University of East Anglia Climatic Research Unit

== Flora and fauna ==
Much like an island surrounded by ocean, the ecology of the Tibesti Mountains is distinguishable from that of the surrounding desert. As such, the mountains lie within their own biome, the 82,000-square-kilometer (31,700 mi^{2}) Tibesti-Jebel Uweinat montane xeric woodlands ecoregion, along with the Jebel Uweinat, a disjunct mountain range that also rises from the Sahara 650 km (400 mi) to the east. Most of the ecoregion remains unexplored due to its remoteness and persistent political instability, yet it is known to contain a number of endemic and endangered species. Indeed, the isolation of the region is a benefit to its flora and fauna, serving as a sort of refuge, allowing plants to grow untrammeled and animals to roam unmolested. Nevertheless, hunting is unregulated in the region, and vegetation has suffered from overgrazing in the past.

=== Flora ===
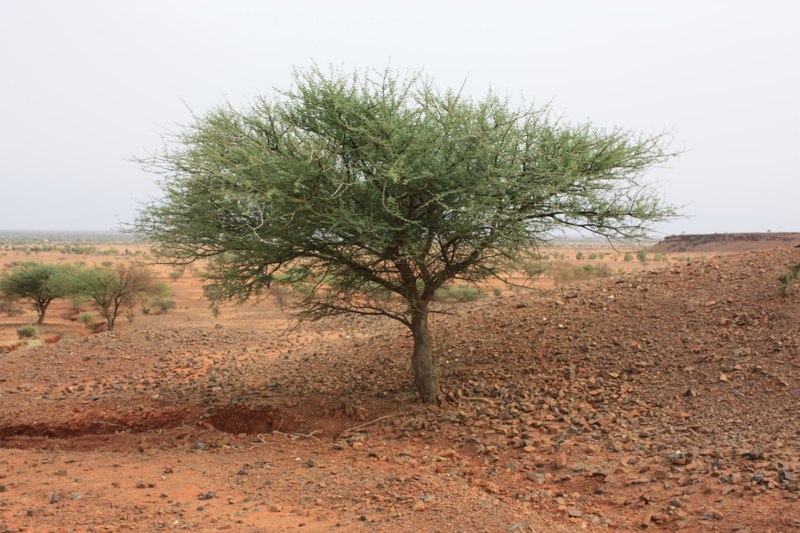
A gay acacia in Burkina Faso

The flora in the Tibesti is Saharomontane, mixing Mediterranean, Sahara, Sahel and Afromontane vegetation. Biodiversity and endemism levels are higher in the Tibesti than in the Aïr Mountains or the Ennedi Plateau, although the vegetation's coverage is highly dependent on rainfall. Oases lie along the courses of the enneris, such as Enneri Yebige, which is virtually unexplored. These oases, which are more numerous to the north and west of the range, are scattered with acacia, figs, palms and tamarisks. Most gueltas are lined with macrophytes—including smooth flatsedge and branched horsetail—and bryophytes—including Oxyrrhynchium speciosum and species of Bryum. Egyptian acacia grows near these water basins. Saharan myrtle and oleander grow between elevations of 1,500 and 2,300 m (4,900 and 7,500 ft) in the western part of the range, while Nile tamarisk grows at similar elevations in its northern part. Downstream, where the current of the enneris is slower and the riverbed is deeper, there are dense thickets of Athel tamarisk and arak.

Around the edge of the Tibesti, where the canyons exit the range, are doum palms. The banks of Mare de Zoui are home to dense stands of reeds (Phragmites australis and Typha capensis), along with sedges (Scirpoides holoschoenus), sea rush, toad rush and branched horsetail, while pondweed grows in the open water. Although the lake appears rich in phytoplankton, it has not been thoroughly studied. To the south and southwest of the range, between 1,600 and 2,300 m (5,200 and 7,500 ft) elevation, the wadis support woody species characteristic of the Sahel, such as Egyptian balsam, grey-leaved cordia, red-leaved fig, sycamore fig, wonderboom and gay acacia. Chrysopogon plumulosus is the most common grass in the area. Other plants have more Mediterranean characteristics, such as Globularia alypum and lavender or the more tropical sweet Indian mallow and least snout-bean. The liverwort Plagiochasma rupestre is found around the wadis at these elevations, as are mosses of the genera Fissidens, Gymnostomum and Timmiella.

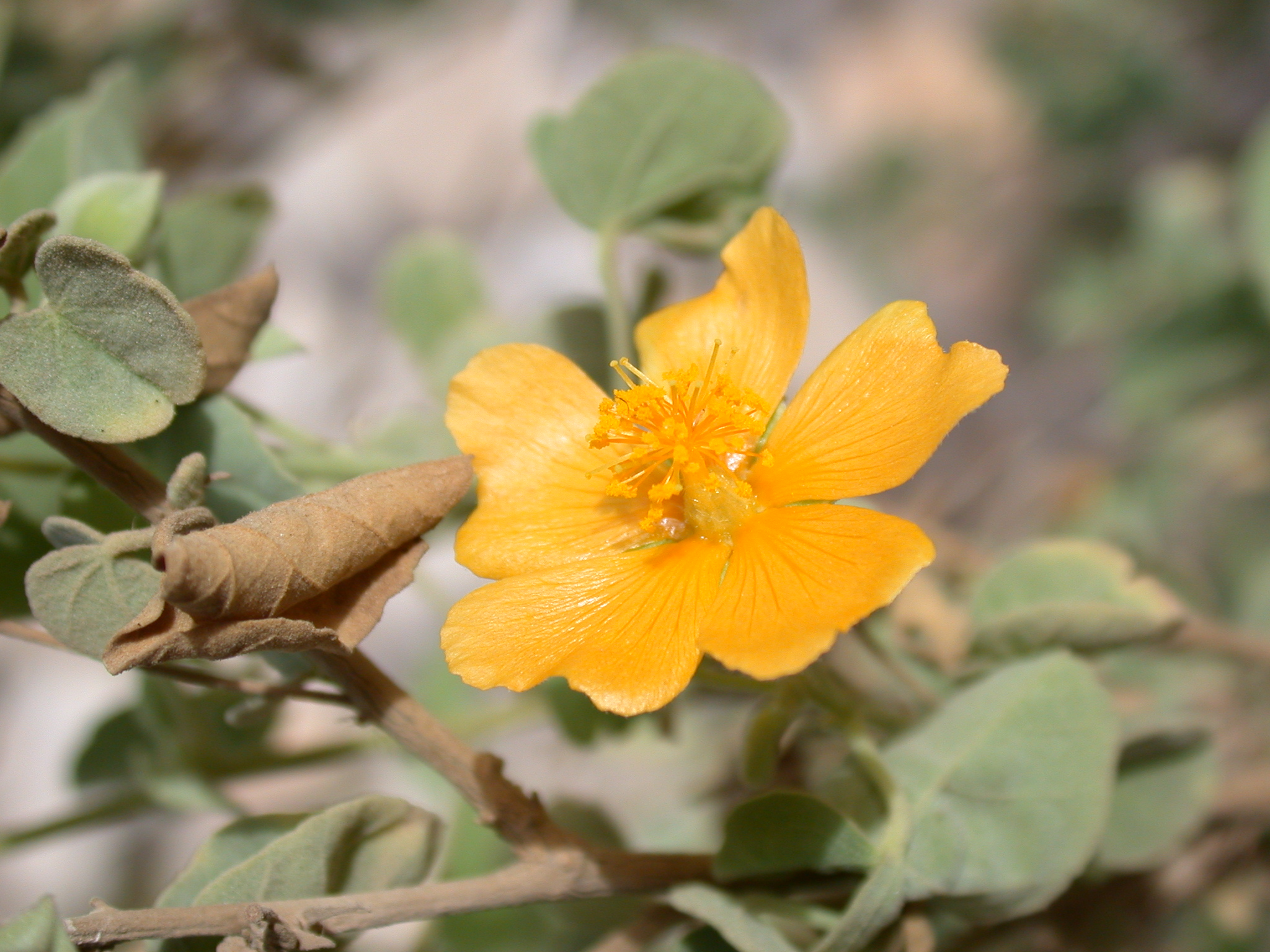
Sweet Indian mallow

Saharomontane grasslands are found on the slopes, plateaus and the upper portions of the wadis at elevations between 1,800 and 2,700 m (5,900 and 8,900 ft). They are dominated by Stipagrostis obtusa and Aristida caerulescens, as well some Eragrostis papposa locally. In addition, shrubs represented by jointed anabis, Fagonia flamandii and Zilla spinosa dot this environment. On the sheltered upper slopes of Emi Koussi is the endemic grass Eragrostis kohorica, named after the volcano's crater.

The vegetation above 2,600 meters (8,500 feet) consists of dwarf shrubs, which are generally limited to 20 to 60 cm (8 to 24 in) in height and do not exceed one meter (3 ft). The shrubbery consists of the species Pentzia monodiana, Artemisia tilhoana and Ephedra tilhoana. At the highest elevations of the Tibesti, tree heath grows from moist crevices formed by early lava flows, while 24 different species of moss provide substrate for the tree heath. Various genera of mosses also grow around fumaroles, including Fissidens, Campylopus, Gymnostomum and Trichostomum. Lichens, though rare in the dry climate of the Tibesti, also grow at these elevations, with green rock shield, scrambled-egg lichen, sunken disk lichen and Squamarina crassa found on the highest peaks.

=== Fauna ===
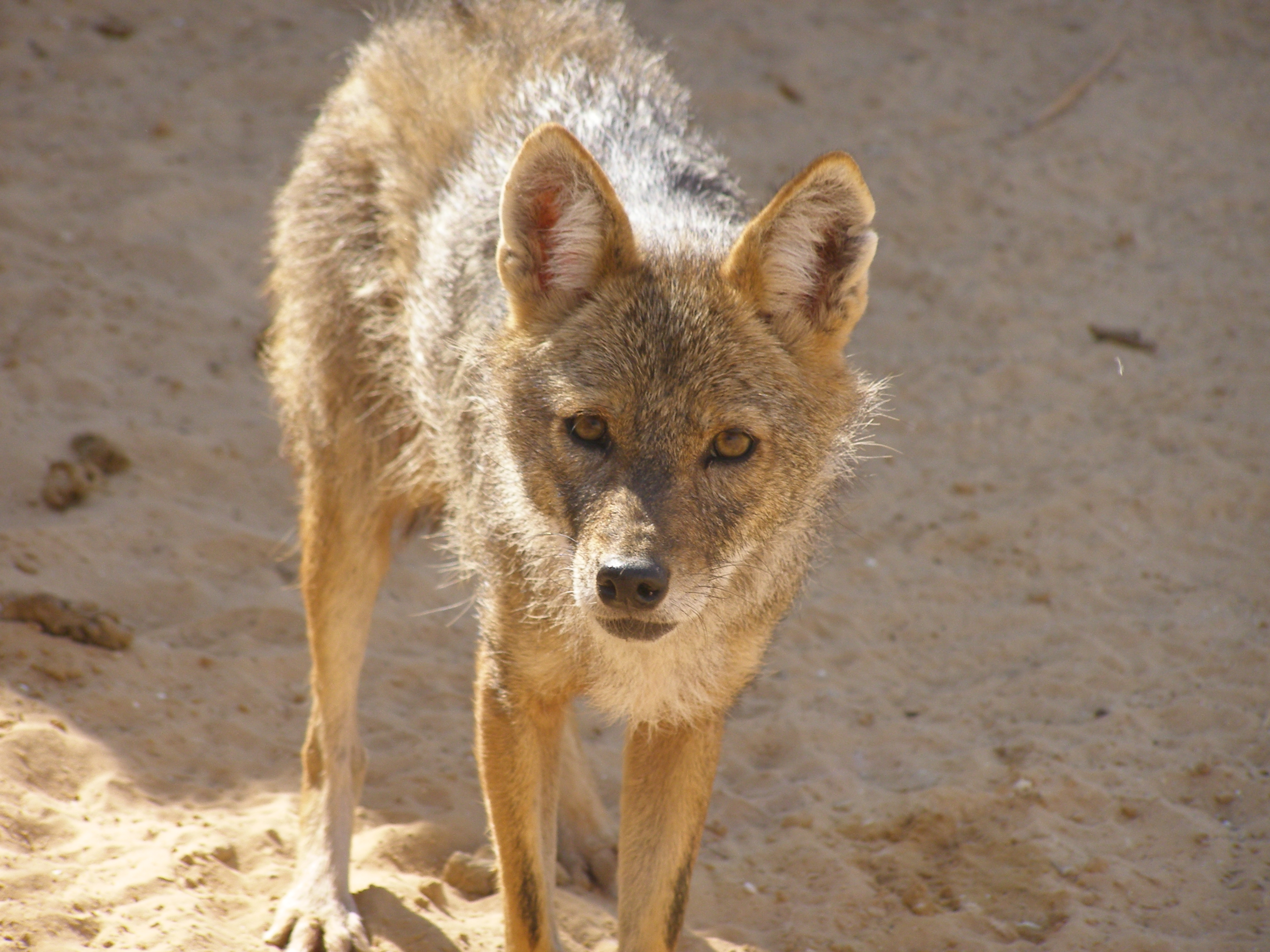
Golden jackals are present in the Tibesti

Mammals abound in the Tibesti. Bovids include the endangered addax along with the dorcas gazelle, rhim gazelle and a significant population of Barbary sheep. Rodents are the most represented order of mammals, and include the spiny mouse, bushy-tailed jird and the North African gerbil. Also present are cats such as the African wildcat and, more rarely, the cheetah, as well as several canine species, including the golden jackal, fennec fox and Rüppell's fox. The striped hyena may also occupy the range. African wild dogs formerly roamed the range, although these populations are now extirpated. Olive baboons, found as recently as 1960, are now likely extirpated as well. Bats are heavily represented in the Tibesti, including the Egyptian mouse-tailed bat, Egyptian slit-faced bat and the trident bat. The Cape hare and the rock hyrax also populate the area.

Reptiles and amphibians, on the other hand, are sparse. Snake species include the braid snake and the long-nosed worm snake. Among the lizards are Bibron's agama, (Note: Although usually ascribed to A. impalearis, the Tibesti agama may in fact be the Afrotropical species A. agama.) the ringed wall gecko and the Sudan mastigure. Mid-20th-century herpetological studies noted the presence of brown frogs and true toads.

Many resident birds can be found in the Tibesti. These include the crowned sandgrouse, bar-tailed lark, blackstart, desert lark, desert sparrow, fulvous babbler, greater hoopoe-lark, Lichtenstein's sandgrouse, pale crag martin, trumpeter finch and the white-crowned wheatear. The Tibesti massif has been designated an Important Bird Area (IBA) by BirdLife International.

The gueltas are flushed periodically each year by stormwater, maintaining low salinity and supporting several species of freshwater fish. These include the African sharptooth catfish, East African red-finned barb, Tibesti labeo (Labeo tibestii, an endemic species) and the redbelly tilapia.

== Population ==
Map of the Tibesti and surrounding area (in French)

The town of Bardaï, located on the northern flank of the mountains at an elevation of 1,020 m (3,350 ft), is the capital of the Tibesti region. It is connected to the town of Zouar, to the southwest, by a track that crosses Tarso Toussidé. The village of Omchi is accessible from Bardaï via Aderké, or from the town of Aouzou via Irbi. These rough tracks extend southward towards Yebbi Souma and Yebbi Bou, and then follow the course of Enneri Misky. The eastern half of the Tibesti is cut off from the western half, and the eastern village of Aozi is accessible from Libya via Ouri. Zouar has an airport, as does Bardaï at Zougra. Bardaï also has a hospital, although the medical supply is very much dependent upon the prevailing political situation.

Map of the Toubou population in Africa

The vast majority of the population is Teda, one of the two ethnicities of the Toubou people. However, some clans are Daza, the other Toubou ethnicity, who left their traditional homes in the lowlands to the south and moved north to the Tibesti. The Toubou live primarily in northern Chad, but also in southern Libya and eastern Niger. The Toubou language has two main dialects, Tedaga, spoken by the Teda, and Dazaga, spoken by the Daza. Despite their differences, the two Toubou groups generally identify as a single ethnic group. The Toubou elect a chief, the Derdé, from the Tomagra clan, although never from the same family consecutively. Historically, individual clans rarely had more than a thousand members and were quite dispersed throughout the Tibesti. In 2009, the population of the Tibesti was officially estimated at 21,000 inhabitants. As of 2017, that number has risen to 54,000 inhabitants. Yet the Toubou, in general, are semi-nomadic, moving between the mountains and other regions, and thus the Tibesti may have no more than 10,000 to 15,000 permanent residents.

Traditional Toubou life is punctuated by the seasons, divided between animal husbandry and agriculture. Twentieth century anthropological studies show Toubou, particularly around palm groves, living in primitive round huts built with stone walls bound by mortar or clay, or built from clay or salt blocks. In the highlands, the buildings were built of stone, forming circles 1.5 m (5 ft) in diameter and one meter (3 ft) high, which served as shelters for goats, or as granaries, or as human shelters and defense structures. In other cases, the Toubou lived in tents that could be easily moved between the fields and the palm groves.

== History ==
=== Human settlement ===
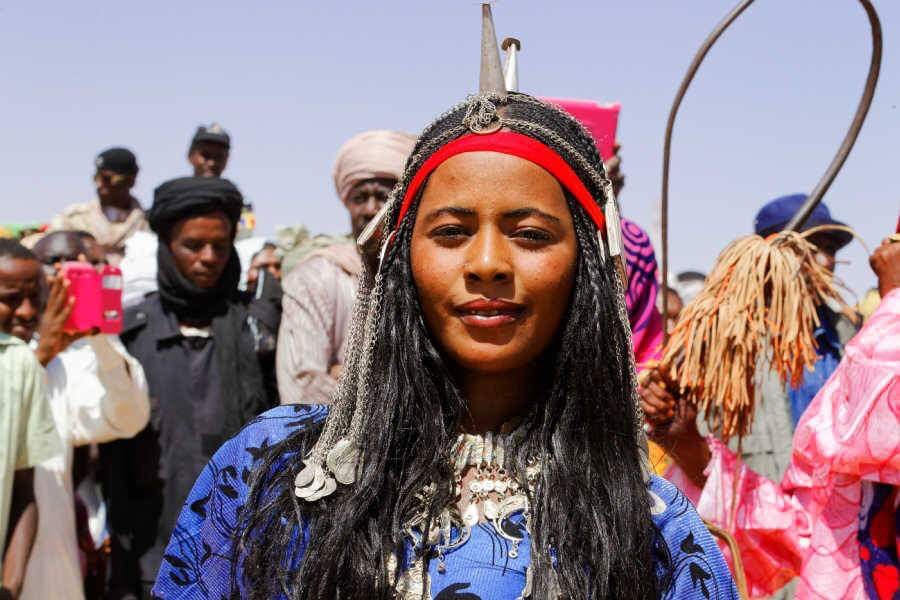
A Toubou woman in traditional attire

There is evidence of human occupation of the Tibesti dating back to the Stone Age, when denser paleovegetation facilitated human habitation. The Toubou were settled in the region by the 5th century BC and eventually established trade relations with the Carthaginian civilization. Around this time, Herodotus mentioned the Toubou, whom he labeled "Aethiopians", and described them as having a language akin to the "cry of bats". (Note: Herodotus described "Aethiopian troglodytes", located "ten days" from Awjila near a "mound of salt, water and palm trees", being pursued by four-horsed chariots of the civilization of Garamantes. Chapelle (1982, p. 36) reasons that these were the Toubou, as troglodytes are by definition cave dwellers, the only caves near the described location are those of the Tassili n'Ajjer and the Tibesti, and the ergs neighboring the Tassili n'Ajjer are unsuitable for chariots, while the flat regs surrounding the Tibesti would have allowed chariots to pursue those who came to plunder the palm groves.)

Herodotus further remarked on a conflict between the Toubou and the civilization of Garamantes based in present-day Libya. Between AD 83 and 92, a Roman traveler, likely a trader, named Julius Maternus, explored the territory of the Tibesti Mountains with, or under the charge of, the king of Garamantes. The Tibesti are suspected by modern historians to have been part of an unidentified country named Agisymba, and Maternus's expedition may have been part of a broader military campaign by Garamantes against the populace of Agisymba. (Note: According to Oliver (1975, p. 290), this populace was "in all probability" the Toubou.)

In the 12th century, the geographer Muhammad al-Idrisi spoke of a "country of Zaghawa negroes", or camel herders, that had converted to Islam. The historian Ibn Khaldun described the Toubou in the 14th century. In the 15th and 16th centuries, Al-Maqrizi and Leo Africanus referred to the "country of the Berdoa", meaning Bardaï, the former associating the Toubou with the Berbers and the latter describing them as Numidian relatives of the Tuareg.

Distribution of the clans of the Tibesti Mountains

The Toubou settled in the Tibesti in several waves. Generally, newcomers either killed or absorbed the previous clans after battles that were often both long-lasting and bloody. The Teda clans, considered indigenous to the area, were first established around Enneri Bardagué. Namely, these clans were the Cerdegua, Zouia, Kossseda (nicknamed yobat or "hunters of well water"), and possibly the Ederguia, although the Ederguia's origin may be Zaghawa and only go back to the 17th century. These clans controlled the palm groves, and made a peace pact with the Tomagra, a nearby clan of camel herders who practiced Ghazw. It was upon the agreement to this pact at the end of the 16th century that power was consolidated under the Derdé, the principal regulator of the clans, whose appointment is always made from the Tomagra clan.

There is evidence of early Daza settlements in the Tibesti; however, these early clans—the Goga, Kida, Terbouna and Obokina—were assimilated into later Daza clans, who arrived in the Tibesti between the 15th and 18th centuries, possibly having fled the Kanem-Bornu Empire in the southwest. These later Daza arrivals include the Arna Souinga in the south, Gouboda in the center-west, Tchioda and Dirsina in the west, Torama in the northwest and center-east, and the Derdekichia (literally, "descendants of the chief," the products of a union between an Arna Souinga and an Emmeouia) in the north. The Tibesti then played the role of an impregnable mountain stronghold for the newcomers. Meanwhile, constant migration between the north and southwest of Chad, along with significant mixing of the populations, forged a significant degree of cohesion among the Toubou ethnicities. Periods of territorial expansion in the 10th and 13th centuries and periods of recession in the 15th and 16th centuries likely coincided with more or less pronounced wet and dry periods.

Several clans with traditions similar to those of the Donzas of the Borkou region, south of the Tibesti, settled in the range in the 16th and 17th centuries. These include the Keressa and Odobaya in the west, Foctoa in the northwest and northeast, and Emmeouia in the north. Several other clans—the Mogode in the west, Terintere in the north, Tozoba in the center, and Tegua and Mada in the south—are originally clans of the Bideyat people who immigrated from the Ennedi Plateau, southeast of Tibesti, around the same time. The Mada, however, have since largely emigrated to Borkou, Kaouar and Kanem.

The early 17th century also saw the arrival of three clans from the region of Kufra to the northeast. The Taïzera settled in the plateau in the center and west of the mass, probably fleeing the Arab push into present-day Libya. According to oral tradition, their leader was initially rejected by the Daza clans and lived in isolation until winning the favor of a Dirsina woman. The Mahadena occupy the northeast quarter of the range and are likely from the Jalo Oasis of Cyrenaica and thus related to the Mogharba Arab tribes, although an alternative hypothesis is that they are of Bideyat origin. Following years of conflict, a branch of the Mahadena clan, the Fortena, withdrew to the western margin of the Tibesti. The Fortena Mado ("Red Fortena") settled there, while the Fortena Yasko ("Black Fortena") pushed further west to Kaouar.

The Tuareg people intermixed with the Toubou clans, especially with the early Goga clan, which produced the Gouboda, and with the later Arna clan, which produced the Mormorea. In both instances, the new clans were placed under the authority of suzerain clans of the traditionally feudal Tuareg, although they were eventually assimilated into the Toubou majority.

The settlement of the Tibesti

The indigenous Teda clans

The Daza clans migrate from Kanem

The Donza clans migrate from Borkou

The Bideyat clans migrate from Ennedi

Other clans migrate from Kufra, Cyrenaica and Jalu

=== Regional relations and colonization ===
In the mid-19th century the Ottoman Empire began a campaign of territorial conquest across northern Africa from its regional headquarters in Libya, yet was unable to subdue the Tibesti. In 1890, to the chagrin of the Turks, France and Great Britain signed a declaration recognizing a French zone of influence in northern Africa from the Mediterranean Sea down to Lake Chad. In response, the Toubou allied with the Senussi Arabs of Libya and agreed that the southern half of the Tibesti could serve as a fallback base for the Senussi in their struggle against the French Colonial Army. As the Sennussis' influence moved southward, so did their headquarters, which in 1899 was moved to the town of Gouro on the southeast flank of the range. The Senussi founded a Zawiya in Bardaï, which quickly promoted the total Islamization of the Tibesti. At the outbreak of the Italo-Turkish War, the Senussi allied with the Ottoman Empire and, at the request of the Derdé, the Turks established garrisons in Tibesti beginning in March 1911. These garrisons fell apart a few months later when the Toubou attacked the Turkish troops.

While the Italians occupied the Fezzan, a French column entered the Tibesti in early 1914 from Kaouar. The region was at the heart of a dispute between the colonial powers, with the Italian Empire to the north and French West Africa to the south. During World War I, a Senussi revolt forced the Italians to temporarily withdraw from the Fezzan and the northeastern part of the Tibesti. Likewise, fierce resistance from the Toubou forced the French troops to retreat southward from the Tibesti in 1916. After a period of internal disorder, the Tibesti was reconquered by the French colonial empire in 1929, and the region was placed under the administration of French Equatorial Africa. Libya gained its independence from Italy in 1947, and was released from British and French oversight in 1951.

=== Modern history ===
==== Chadian Civil War ====
Chad gained independence from France in 1960, and in 1965 the Chadian government led by François Tombalbaye imposed its administrative and judicial authority in the Tibesti. Mere days after the withdrawal of French troops from the region, rebellion erupted in Bardaï, followed by numerous small battles over subsequent months and a more significant battle in Bardaï in September. In response, the Tombalbaye government imposed travel and trade restrictions on the Toubou and voided the traditional power of the then Derdé, Oueddei Kichidemi. Kichidemi went into exile in Libya the following year and became a national symbol in Chad for opposition to the government. These events sparked the First Chadian Civil War, which lasted from 1965 to 1979.

In 1968, the French Army, at the request of Tombalbaye, intervened in an attempt to put an end to the rebellion. However, French General Edouard Cortadellas admitted their attempts to quell the Toubou were essentially hopeless, remarking, "I believe we should draw a line below [the Tibesti region] and leave them to their stones. We can never subdue them." The French therefore focused their intervention on the center and east of the country, leaving the Tibesti region largely alone.

In 1969, Goukouni Oueddei, a Teda leader, and Hissène Habré, a Daza leader, emerged from the Tibesti to form the Second Liberation Army. In April 1974, the Second Liberation Army captured Bardaï from the Chadian government and took hostage the French archeologist Françoise Claustre, German doctor Christophe Staewen and Marc Combe, an assistant to Claustre's husband, and held them in the mountains. Staewen's wife and two soldiers of the Chadian army were killed. The West German government quickly paid the ransom and Staewen was released. The French government sent the military officer Pierre Galopin to negotiate with the rebels, but he was captured by the rebels and executed in April 1975. Marc Combe was able to escape in May 1975. The remaining hostages were released in January 1977 in Tripoli after France acceded to the rebels' ransom demand. The hostage incident, known as "L'affaire Claustre", caused a rift between the French and Chadian governments.

Another rift formed between Goukouni and Habré, which by 1976 had spread to the Second Liberation Army, leaving one side commanded by Habré and the other commanded by Goukouni and supported by Libya. In June 1977, Goukouni's forces attacked the Chadian government stronghold in Bardaï. The rebels also attacked Zouar. These battles resulted in the death of 300 government troops. Bardaï surrendered to the rebels on July 4, while Zouar was evacuated. The Chadian government, led by Félix Malloum since Tombalbaye's overthrow in 1975, signed a peace agreement with Habré in 1978, although fighting with other rebel groups, many aligned with Libya, continued.

==== Tibesti War ====
Map showing the Aouzou Strip between Chad and Libya

In 1978, war broke out between Chad and Libya ostensibly over the Aouzou Strip, a 114,000-square-kilometer (44,000 mi^{2}) borderland between Chad and Libya that extends into the Tibesti Mountains and is rumored to contain uranium deposits. In 1980, Libya used the strip as a base from which stage an attack, led by Goukouni, on the Chadian capital, N'Djamena, located in southern Chad and controlled by Habré. N'Djamena was toppled in December; however, under considerable international pressure, Libya withdrew from southern Chad in late 1981, and Habré's Armed Forces of the North (FAN) took control of the entirety of Chad with the exception of the Tibesti, where Goukouni retreated with his Libyan-backed Government of National Unity (GUNT) forces. Goukouni then established a National Peace Government in Bardaï and proclaimed it the legitimate government of Chad. Habré attacked the GUNT in the Tibesti in both December 1982 and January 1983 but was repelled on both occasions. Although fighting intensified over the next several months, the mountains remained under the control of the GUNT and Libyan forces.

By 1986, following a series of military defeats, the GUNT had begun to disintegrate along with relations between Goukouni and Libya. In December, Goukouni was arrested by the Libyan authorities, which spurred his troops to attack Libyan positions in the Tibesti, forcing the Libyans to withdraw. Libya sought to retake Bardaï and Zouar, and sent a task-force of 2,000 troops with T-62 tanks and heavy support by the Libyan Air Force into the Tibesti. The offensive started successfully, expelling the GUNT from its key strongholds. The attack ultimately backfired, however, as it resulted in the prompt reaction of Habré, who sent 2,000 soldiers to support the GUNT forces. Although the Libyans were only partially repelled from the Tibesti, the broader campaign was a great strategic victory, as it transformed a civil war into a national war against a foreign invader, stimulating a sense of national unity never before seen in Chad. After a series of defeats in northeastern Chad, Libyan forces withdrew fully from the Tibesti in March 1987.

==== MDJT War ====
Following a decade of relative peace, in late 1997 the Tibesti saw the formation of the Movement for Democracy and Justice in Chad (MDJT), a rebel group opposed to Chadian president Idriss Déby. Numbering around 1,000 fighters at its peak between 2000 and 2001, and financed by Libyan Teda clans and the Libyan government, the MDJT was able to take control of several towns in the Tibesti. Battles with the Chadian National Army (ANT) were particularly violent between 1998 and 2002, resulting in the deaths of between 500 and 850 MDJT rebels and a comparable number of ANT soldiers at locales across northern Chad, including Bardaï. Although civilian casualties were relatively limited, many civilians were killed and injured by landmines, and the war resulted in the displacement of a large portion of the local population.

Between 1998 and 2010 the MDJT had established a weak government in the Tibesti region, functionally independent from that of Chad. In 2002, however, weakened by its isolation in the Tibesti and from a series of military defeats, the MDJT split into several factions following the death of its leader, Youssouf Togoïmi. In 2005, under pressure from Libya, the "most legitimate" MDJT faction signed a peace agreement with the Chadian government, yet the war continued, albeit at a lower intensity. From 2009 to 2010, the last of the MDJT rebels surrendered to the Chadian government. The legacy of decades of war continues to burden the Tibesti with a lack of government, a warrior culture, and a landscape strewn with thousands of landmines.

==== Gold rush ====
Gold was discovered in the Tibesti Mountains in 2012, attracting prospectors from across the Sahel. The arrival of migrants has led to violent conflicts with the Teda locals, a problem exacerbated by an influx of weaponry to the region due to the ongoing wars in Darfur and Libya. Violence has also arisen as a result of disputes between the miners themselves; for example, around 100 people were killed in May 2022 over a "banal dispute" between miners. The increased migration has also increased drug traffic, with the Tibesti lying along the trans-Saharan smuggling route for South American cocaine destined for Europe. Nevertheless, the gold discovery has benefited the impoverished region economically. Many Tibesti residents have been able to purchase goods such as cars, televisions and satellite telephones that they could not otherwise afford. "If by the grace of God, gold had not appeared we would not even have anything to eat", remarked one Tibesti prospector.

=== Scientific exploration and research ===
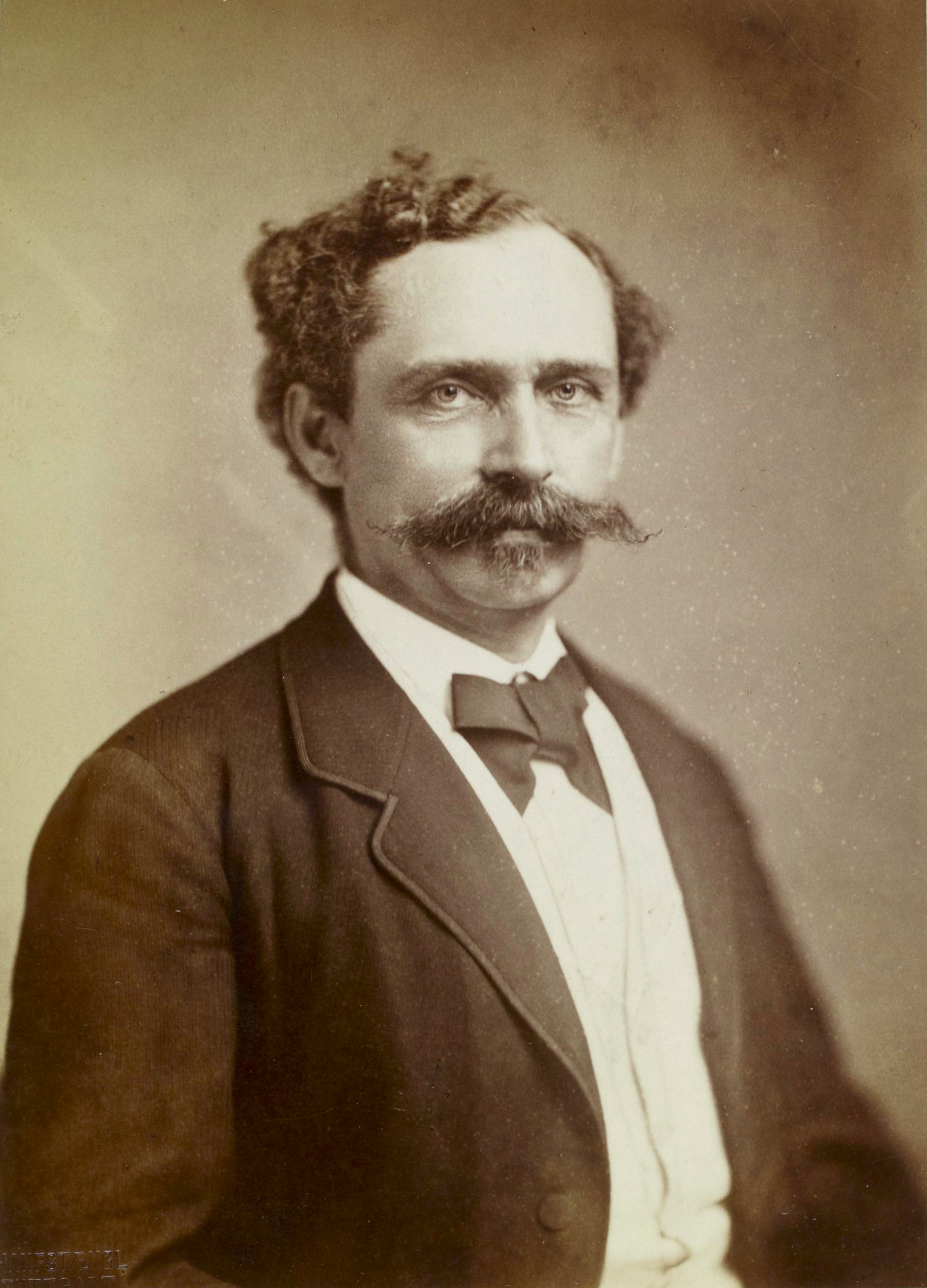
Gustav Nachtigal, the first European explorer of the Tibesti

Due to its isolation and geopolitical situation, the Tibesti Mountains were long unexplored by scientists. The German Gustav Nachtigal was the first European to explore, albeit with great difficulty, the Tibesti in 1869. While Nachtigal provided an accurate description of the population, his expedition was fiercely opposed by the Toubou, and his account discouraged any new adventure into the Tibesti for over 40 years. Later expeditions carried out between 1920 and 1970 yielded valuable information on the geology and petrology of the range. The French anthropologist Charles le Cœur and his wife Marguerite, a geographer, lived among the Teda of Tibesti between 1933 and 1935. Le Cœur was the first to closely study the Tibesti populace, but the outbreak of World War II prevented him from publishing his research. (Note: Le Cœur was killed in action in Italy in 1944.) French Colonel Jean Chapelle published a book on the Toubou and their lifestyle in 1957. In 1965, the Free University of Berlin opened a geomorphological research station in Bardaï; however, research was slowed due to the Chadian Civil War, and the station was ultimately closed in 1974.

Although the Tibesti is one of the world's most significant examples of intracontinental volcanism, ongoing political instability and the presence of landmines means that, today, geologic research often must be conducted on the basis of satellite images and comparison with research on Martian volcanoes. Little public geologic research had been conducted in the Tibesti Mountains until the work of Gourgaud and Vincent in 2004; however, an expedition in 2015 sought to assess the feasibility of establishing a new geoscience research station in Bardaï.

=== Climbing history ===
Although not an alpine climb, Gustav Nachtigal ascended to 2,400 m (7,873 ft) elevation as he traversed a pass abutting Pic Toussidé during his exploration of the Tibesti in 1869. The Englishman Wilfred Thesiger summited the highest mountain in the range, the 3,415-meter (11,204 ft) Emi Koussi, in 1938. In 1948, the Swiss Foundation for Alpine Research mounted an expedition under Edouard Wyss-Dunant, which scaled both the peak and needle of Botoum, at 2,400 m (7,900 ft) and 2,000 m (6,600 ft), respectively.

In 1957, Peter Steele led a University of Cambridge expedition that sought to conquer Tarso Tieroko, which Thesiger had described as "probably the most beautiful peak in Tibesti". After climbing two peaks situated on a ridge to the north, (Note: The two peaks are "The Imposter" and "Hadrian's Peak.") they attempted Tieroko, but just 60 m (200 ft) from the summit, they were faced with a vertical, crumbling rock wall and were forced to descend. Following this defeat, they took the opportunity to climb Emi Koussi, 19 years after its first ascent by Thesiger, and also Pic Woubou, a prominent spire located between Bardaï and Aouzou. Seven years later, in 1965, a team led by the Englishman Doug Scott succeeded in climbing Tieroko.

In 1963, an expedition under the Italian Guido Monzino ascended a peak in the massif of the Aiguilles of Sissé which, despite rising only 800 ft (240 m) above ground level, proved "very difficult". The Englishman Eamon "Ginge" Fullen scaled Bikku Bitti, the highest peak in Libya at 2,266 m (7,434 ft), in 2005, capping a successful Guinness World Records attempt. Due to the unstable political situation, mountaineering in the Tibesti remains a challenging endeavor today.

== Economy ==
=== Natural resources ===
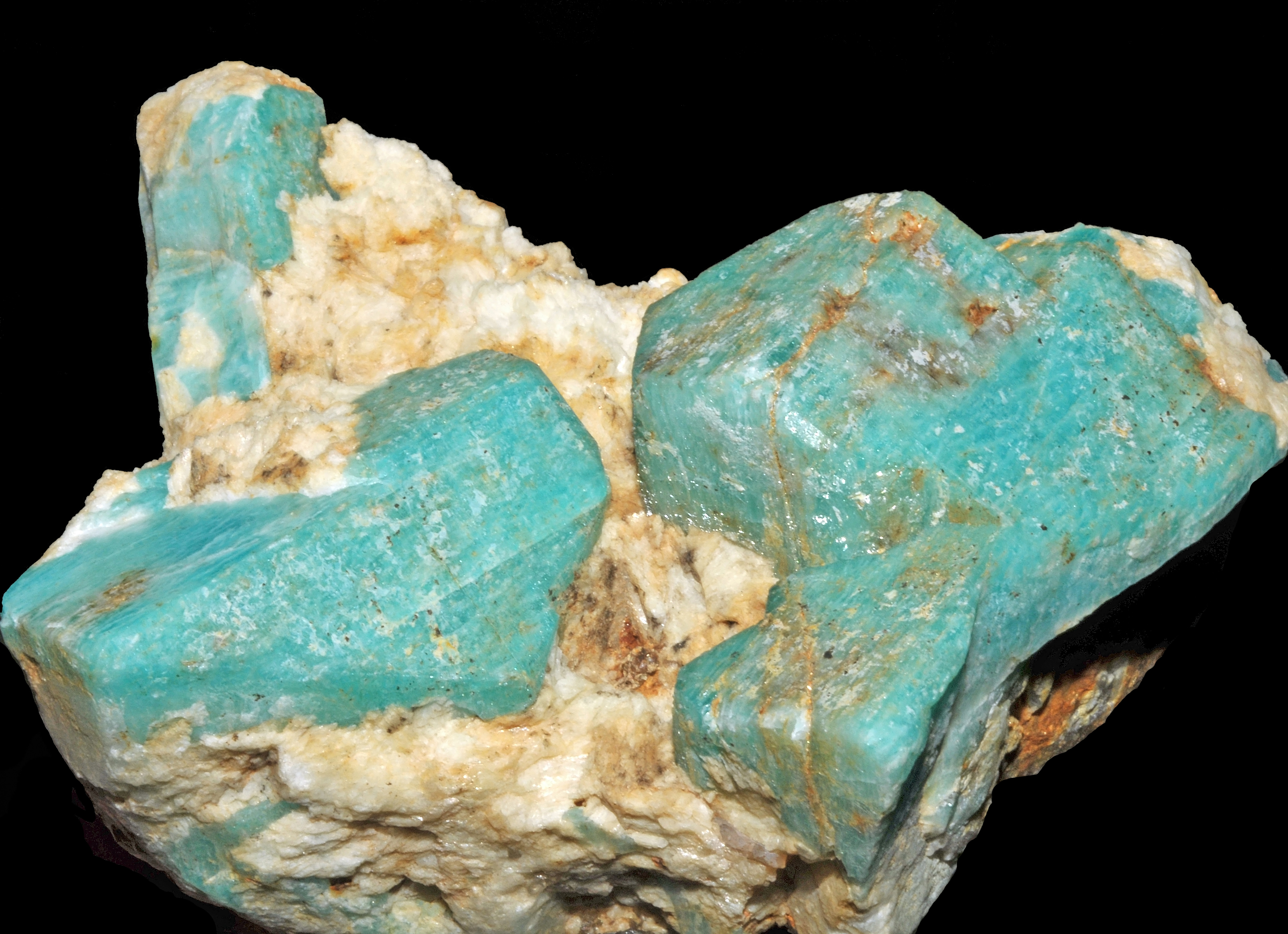
Amazonite from Ethiopia

Although gold was long known to exist in small quantities, substantial deposits were discovered in 2012. Diamonds have also been found. The mountains and their surroundings could contain significant quantities of uranium, tin, tungsten, niobium, tantalum, beryllium, lead, zinc and copper. Amazonite is present and was reportedly mined by the ancient Libyan civilization of Garamantes. Salt is mined today, and is an important source of income for the Toubou.

The Soborom geothermal field, the name of which means "healing water", (Note: At least one other source reports that the name instead means "boiling water".) is known to locals for its medicinal qualities; its pools are rumored to cure dermatitis and rheumatism after several days of soaking. As of the latest analysis, in 1992, Mare de Zoui and its surroundings were rarely visited, aside from a nearby oasis. However, there are numerous small oases on the plains of Borkou, near Emi Koussi, which are extensively exploited. This water is thought to be sourced from the Tibesti Mountains, from where it flows underground before surfacing at these springs.

=== Agriculture ===
There are accessible oases to the west and north of the range. Where mosquitoes do not abound, they support several villages, such as Zouar where, by the 1950s, indigenous plant species had been largely replaced by some 56,000 date palms (Phoenix dactylifera). The dates are harvested between late July and early August. In winter, when reserves are depleted, it is not uncommon for the cores of the dates and the fiber of the palms to be ground into a paste and consumed. Some native palm species remain, such as the doum palm (Hyphaene thebaica), from which the hard yet vaguely-sweet fruit rinds are collected, ground and consumed, despite their low nutritional value. The banks of the enneris grow desert gourd (Citrullus colocynthis), which are collected in October to extract the bitter seeds which, after being washed, are ground to make flour. Women are customarily responsible for gathering wild grains on the tarsos in August.

Horticulture is practiced on a small scale using traditional irrigation methods. The palm groves can also grow wheat, millet and maize, but the crops are spotty and sometimes swept away by flooding. In the 1950s, in total, including barley, the Tibesti produced 300 metric tons (330 short tons) of cereals each year. On the plains of Borkou, some fields are irrigated, where cattle, goats and dromedaries can drink. In the 1950s, it was reported that goats and, more rarely, sheep numbered 50,000 heads, while 8,000 dromedaries and 7,000 donkeys were being raised in the range. Since the droughts of the 1970s and 1980s, dromedaries have come to dominate at the expense of cattle. Most animals spend the winter on the plateaus or in the high valleys. They descend into the lower valleys in February, just after the sowing of wheat, and then return in June to allow harvest. Fishing is possible in the water holes. Traditionally, agricultural product was traded once a year in exchange for fabrics.

=== Tourism ===
As the Sahara's highest mountain range, with geothermal features, a distinctive culture, and numerous rock and parietal artworks, the Tibesti has tourism potential. However, tourist accommodations are limited at best. In the early 2010s, the French adventure travel company Point-Afrique financed the repair of the airport at Faya-Largeau, some 200 kilometers (120 mi) southeast of the Tibesti, and established direct charter flights between Faya and Marseille. Although the flights mainly brought tourists destined for the Ounianga Lakes UNESCO World Heritage Site, there was considerable hope that they would also open the gates for tourism in the Tibesti. For example, the Chadian government invested in a tourist camp along with walled pavilions in Bardaï. Yet, following the Libyan Crisis and France's intervention in Mali, the French government pressured tour operators to prevent French tourists from venturing into the Sahara, and the flights ended.

As of 2017, there are essentially only two tour operators in Chad, run by Chadians and Italians and both based in N'Djamena, which offer all the tours that exist in Chad, including trips to the Tibesti. Tours are typically multi-week affairs, with tourists accommodated in tents. They include exposure to Toubou cultural traditions and to the Tibesti's rock and parietal art. Continuing civil unrest and the presence of landmines pose a danger to tourists, and, despite the occasional tour group, the Tibesti remains one of the most isolated places on Earth.

=== Conservation ===
The resources available for conservation in the Tibesti are limited. In 2006, various non-governmental working groups proposed a protected area to preserve the area's rhim gazelle and Barbary sheep populations. The protected area would be modeled after the Ouadi Rimé-Ouadi Achim Faunal Reserve to the south. However, due to economic and political barriers, the project has not moved beyond the proposal stage. Nevertheless, the establishment of two World Heritage Sites (Note: Lakes of Ounianga and the Ennedi Plateau) in northern Chad in 2012 and 2016 has renewed hope that a similar feat might be achieved in the Tibesti.

== Art and literature ==
=== Rock and parietal art ===
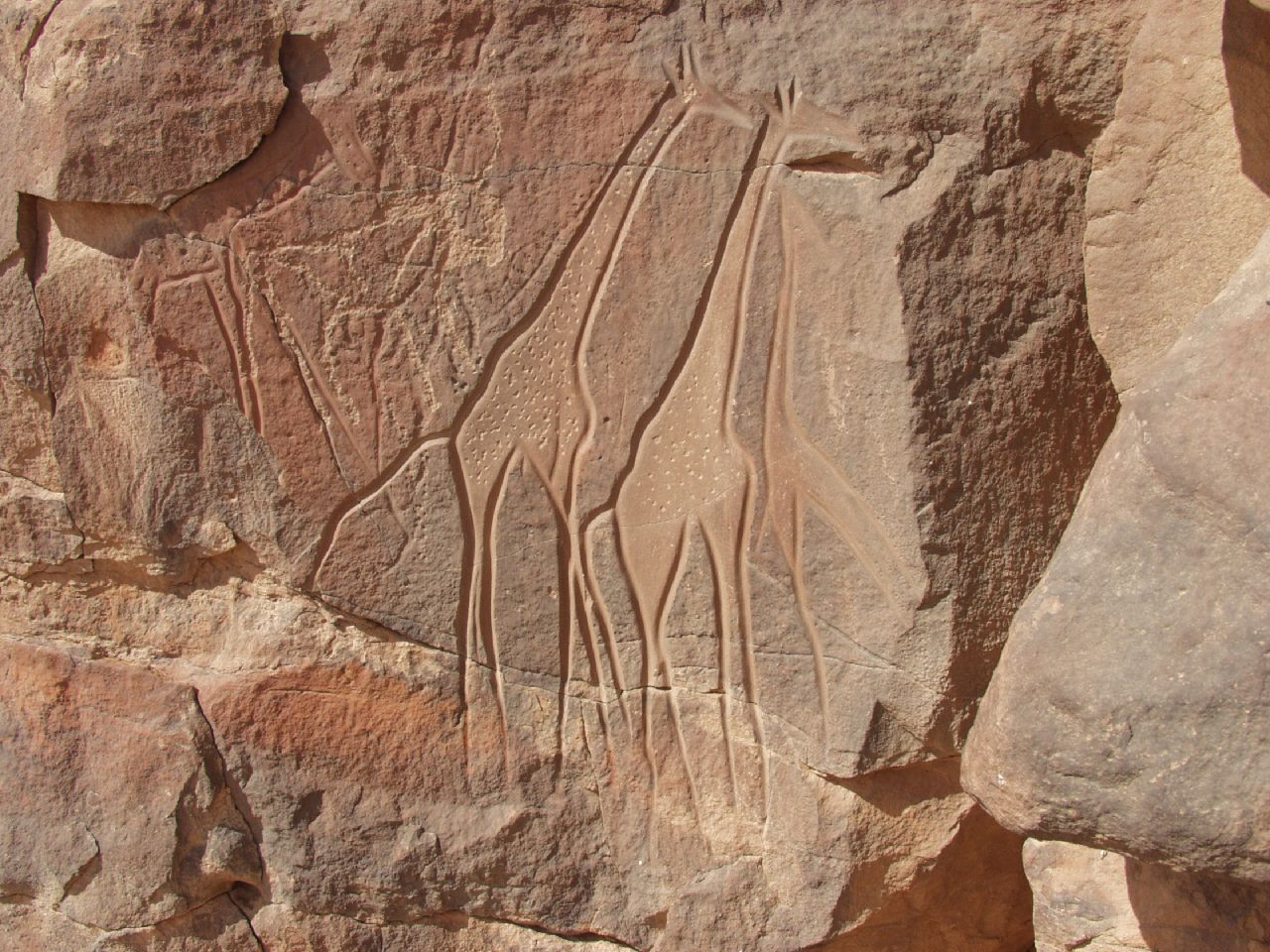
Rock art in the Fezzan

The Tibesti Mountains are renowned for their rock and parietal art. Around 200 engraving sites and 100 painting sites have been identified. Many date as early as the 6th millennium BC, long before the arrival of the Toubou. The art has suffered the effects of time, including weathering from sand blown by the wind. The earliest works often portray animals that have since died out in the region due to climate change, including elephants, rhinoceros, hippopotamus and giraffes. More recent art includes ostriches, antelopes, gazelles, baboons and sheep. Later works, dated less than 2000 years old, portray domesticated animals, such as oxen and camels.

Other engravings portray warriors dressed in feathers or spiked ornaments and armed with bows, shields, assegai, or traditional knives. Still others portray celebrations and scenes from everyday life. The walls of a canyon near Bardaï have engravings that measure over 2 meters (7 ft) in height, including that of the "man of Gonoa", Gonoa being the name of the enneri that runs through the valley. These primarily show hunting scenes. The Tibesti art is unique in the Sahara because of the absence of inscriptions, the relative lack of chariots, and the low representation of camels and horses until comparatively recently.

=== Other works ===
The Tibesti Mountains have inspired several contemporary works of art and literature. The volcanic spires of the Tibesti, along with a stylized sheep's head, were displayed on a 20 CFA franc postage stamp issued by Republic of Chad in 1962. In 1989, French painter and sculptor Jean Vérame used the natural surroundings of the Tibesti to create multidimensional land art works by painting rocks.

The Tibesti range was featured in the 1958 short story "Le Mura di Anagoor" ("The Walls of Anagoor") by the Italian novelist Dino Buzzati. (Note: Although the plot of "Le Mura di Anagoor" takes place in the Tibesti, at least one English translation has moved it to Tibet.) In the story, a local guide offers to show a traveler the walls of a great city that is absent from the maps. The city is exceedingly opulent, yet exists in total autarky and does not submit to higher authority. The traveler waits many years, in vain, to enter the Tibesti city.

== Notes and references ==
=== Bibliography ===
- Animals Committee (22nd) (July 7–13, 2006). Document 10.2: Annex 6c: Uromastyx dispar Heyden, 1827. CITES. Lima, Peru.
- Arnold, Guy (2009). The A to Z of Civil Wars in Africa. Scarecrow Press. ISBN 978-0-8108-7048-2.
- Arsenault, Claire (September 6, 2006). "'La captive du désert' est morte" [The "captive of the desert" is dead] (in French). Radio France Internationale. Archived from the original on January 30, 2011.
- Azevedo, Mario J.; Decalo, Samuel (2018). Historical Dictionary of Chad. Rowman & Littlefield. ISBN 978-1-5381-1437-7.
- Baldur, Gabriel (2018). "Exploration of the Tibesti Mountains – Re-appraisal after 50 years". In Runge, Jürgen (ed.). The African Neogene: Climate, Environments and People. International Yearbook of Landscape Evolution and Paleoenvironments. Paleoecology of Africa. Vol. 34: The African Neogene – Climate, Environments and People. CRC Press. ISBN 978-1-1380-6212-2.
- Baroin, Catherine (1985). Anarchie et cohésion sociale chez les Toubou: les Daza Kéšerda (Niger) [Anarchy and social cohesion among the Toubou: Daza Kešerda (Niger)] (in French). Cambridge University Press. ISBN 978-0-521-30476-4.
- Baroin, Catherine (2003). Du sable sec à la montagne humide, deux terrains à l'épreuve d'une même méthodologie [Dry sand to damp mountain, two sites tested with the same methodology] (PDF) (Thesis) (in French). Université de Paris X - Nanterre. Archived (PDF) from the original on July 2, 2013.
- Baseline Study C: Etude de l'état des instruments politiques, capacités institutionnelles et niveaux de sensibilisation en relation avec les changements climatiques et les aires protégées en Afrique de l'Ouest: Gambie, Mali, Sierra Leone, Tchad et Togo (PDF) (Report) (in French). United Nations Environment Programme. September 2009. Archived from the original (PDF) on May 21, 2013.
- Beauvilain, Alain (1996). Pages d'histoire naturelle de la terre tchadienne [The Natural History of the Chadian Land] (PDF) (in French). Centre national d'appui à la recherche. OCLC 54307645. Archived from the original (PDF) on July 8, 2018.
- Beck, Pierre; Huard, Paul (1969). Tibesti, carrefour de la préhistoire saharienne [Tibesti, crossroads of Saharan prehistory] (in French). Arthaud. OCLC 919879871.
- Benda, Peter; Spitzenberger, Friederike; Hanák, Vladimír; Andreas, Michal; Reiter, Anontín; Ševčík, Martin; Šmíd, Jiří; Uhrin, Marcel (2014). "Bats (Mammalia: Chiroptera) of the Eastern Mediterranean and Middle East. Part 11. On the bat fauna of Libya II". Acta Societatis Zoologicae Bohemicae. 78: 1–162.
- Berque, Augustin (1993). "Beyond the Modern Landscape". AA Files (25): 33–37. JSTOR 29543834.
- Beudels, Marie-Odile (January 30, 2008). "Chad". Royal Belgian Institute of Natural Sciences. Archived from the original on November 27, 2007.
- Bosworth, Clifford Edmund (2012). "Tibesti". In Bearman, Peri J.; Bianquis, Thierry; Bosworth, Clifford Edmund; van Donzel, Emeri Johannes; Heinrichs, Wolfhart P. (eds.). Encyclopaedia of Islam. Brill. doi:10.1163/1573-3912_islam_SIM_7534.
- Braquehais, Stéphanie (February 14, 2006). "Bardaï, village garnison au cœur du désert" [Bardaï, village garrison in the heart of the desert] (in French). Radio France Internationale. Archived from the original on February 18, 2011.
- Braun, Klaus; Passon, Jacqueline, eds. (2020). Across the Sahara: Tracks, Trade and Cross-Cultural Exchange in Libya. Springer. doi:10.1007/978-3-030-00145-2. ISBN 978-3-030-00145-2. S2CID 177517883.
- Buzzati, Dino (1958). "Les Murs d'Anagoor". Sessanta racconti [Sixty stories] (in Italian). Mondadori. OCLC 459008523.
- Buzzati, Dino (1984). Restless Nights: Selected Stories of Dino Buzzati. Translated by Venuti, Lawrence. Carcanet Press. ISBN 978-0-85635-488-5.
- Camps-fabrer, Henriette (1999). "Guépard" [Cheetah]. Encyclopédie berbère (in French). Vol. 21. Édisud. pp. 3231–3234. doi:10.4000/encyclopedieberbere.1810.
- Chapelle, Jean (1982) [1957]. Nomades noirs du Sahara: les Toubous [Black nomads of the Sahara: the Toubou] (in French). L'Harmattan. ISBN 978-2-296-28368-8.
- Collelo, Thomas, ed. (1990). "Chad: Toubou and Daza: Nomads of the Sahara". Chad: A Country Study. Library of Congress. LCCN 89600373. Archived from the original on February 28, 2013.
- Conklin, Alice L. (2013). In the Museum of Man: Race, Anthropology, and Empire in France, 1850–1950. Cornell University Press. ISBN 978-0-8014-6903-9.
- Correau, Laurent (August 18, 2008). "1974–1977 L'affaire Claustre et la rupture avec Habré" [1974–1977 The Claustre affair and break with Habré] (in French). Radio France Internationale. Archived from the original on March 16, 2012.
- Cox, A. D. M., ed. (1965). "Expeditions" (PDF). Alpine Journal. 70 (310–311): 120–132. Archived (PDF) from the original on July 15, 2020.
- Davis, Whitney (1984). "Representation and Knowledge in the Prehistoric Rock Art of Africa". African Archaeological Review. 2: 7–35. doi:10.1007/BF01117224. JSTOR 25130436. S2CID 144539970.
- Desanges, Jehan (1964). "Note sur la datation de l'expédition de Julius Maternus au pays d''Agisymba'" [Note on the dating of Julius Maternus' expedition to the land of "Agisymba"]. Latomus (in French). 23 (4): 713–725. JSTOR 41523030.
- El Makkrouf, Ali Ahmed (1988). "Tectonic interpretation of Jabal Eghei area and its regional application to Tibesti orogenic belt, south central Libya (S.P.L.A.J.)". Journal of African Earth Sciences. 7 (7–8): 945–967. Bibcode:1988JAfES...7..945E. doi:10.1016/0899-5362(88)90009-7.
- Fearon, James; Laitin, David; Kasara, Kimuli (July 7, 2006). "Chad" (PDF). Stanford University. Archived from the original (PDF) on October 22, 2016.
- Ferrari, Massimo; Tinazzi, Claudia; D'Erchia, Annalucia (2020). "New Foundation Cities". In Aste, Niccolò; Della Torre, Stefano; Talamo, Cinzia; Singh Adhikari, Rajendra; Rossi, Corinna (eds.). Innovative Models for Sustainable Development in Emerging African Countries (PDF). Springer. doi:10.1007/978-3-030-33323-2_2. ISBN 978-3-030-33323-2. S2CID 213102386. Archived (PDF) from the original on March 17, 2021.
- Fisher, Alan George Bernard; Fisher, Humphrey J. (1987). "Nachtigal's Companions". Paideuma. 33: 231–262. JSTOR 41409917.
- Geniez, Philippe; Padial, José M.; Crochet, Pierre-André (2011). "Systematics of north African Agama (Reptilia: Agamidae): a new species from the central Saharan mountains". Zootaxa. 3098 (1): 26–56. doi:10.11646/zootaxa.3098.1.3.
- Giazzi, Frank (1996). La Réserve Naturelle Nationale de l'Aïr et du Ténéré (Niger) [The National Nature Reserve of the Aïr and Ténéré (Niger)] (in French). International Union for Conservation of Nature. ISBN 978-2-8317-0249-0.
- Ginsberg, Joshua R.; Macdonald, David W. (1990). Foxes, Wolves, Jackals, and Dogs: An Action Plan for the Conservation of Canids (PDF). International Union for Conservation of Nature. Archived (PDF) from the original on March 5, 2016.
- Gourgaud, Alain; Vincent, Pierre M. (2004). "Petrology of two continental alkaline intraplate series at Emi Koussi volcano, Tibesti, Chad". Journal of Volcanology and Geothermal Research. 129 (4): 261–290. Bibcode:2004JVGR..129..261G. doi:10.1016/S0377-0273(03)00277-4.
- Grolle, Johann (May 25, 2013). "Miracle in the Sahara: Oasis Sediments Archive Dramatic History". ABC News. Archived from the original on March 13, 2018.
- Grove, Alfred Thomas (1960). "Geomorphology of the Tibesti Region with Special Reference to Western Tibesti". The Geographical Journal. 126 (1): 18–27. Bibcode:1960GeogJ.126...18G. doi:10.2307/1790425. JSTOR 1790425.
- Hagedorn, Horst (1997). "Tibesti". In Tillet, Thierry (ed.). Sahara: Paléomilieux et peuplement préhistorique au Pléistocène supérieur [Sahara: paleoenvironments and prehistoric populations in the Upper Pleistocene] (in French). L'Harmattan. ISBN 978-2-7384-6086-8. OCLC 39372160.
- Hellmich, Walter (1972). Hochgebirgsforschung: Tibesti-Zentrale Sahara arbeiten aus der Hochgebirgsregion [High mountain research: Tibesti-Central-Sahara work from the high mountain region] (in German). Universitätsverlag Wagner. OCLC 174113929.
- Henderson, David H. (April 2, 1984). War since 1945 Seminar: Conflict in Chad, 1975 to Present: A Central African Tragedy (Report). Marine Corps Command and Staff College. Archived from the original on August 28, 2020.
- Higgins, Rosalyn (July 2, 1993). "The Reactions of Chad to the Libyan Occupation" ( (PDF)). Public sitting held on Friday July 2, 1993, at 10 a.m., at the Peace Palace, President Sir Robert Jennings presiding in the case concerning Territorial Dispute (Libyan Arab Jamahiriya/Chad). The Hague: International Court of Justice. Archived from the original on July 27, 2001.
- Hughes, Ralph H.; Hughes, Jane S.; Bernacsek, Garry M. (1992). "Chad" ( (PDF)). A Directory of African Wetlands (PDF). International Union for Conservation of Nature. ISBN 978-2-88032-949-5. Archived from the original on September 24, 2012.
- Huß, Werner (2006). "Agisymba". In Cancik, Hubert; Schneider, Helmuth (eds.). Brill's New Pauly. Brill. doi:10.1163/1574-9347_bnp_e108180.
- Ingram, Stuart (2001). "Africa: Travel and Adventure" (PDF). Summit. British Mountaineering Council. pp. 37–39. Archived (PDF) from the original on November 11, 2020.
- Jacobs, Frank (November 7, 2011). "The World's Largest Sandbox". The New York Times. Archived from the original on October 6, 2019.
- Jäkel, Dieter (1977). "The Work of the Field Station at Bardai in the Tibesti Mountains". The Geographical Journal. 143 (1): 61–72. Bibcode:1977GeogJ.143...61J. doi:10.2307/1796675. ISSN 0016-7398. JSTOR 1796675.
- Kaiser, Karlheinz (1972). "Der känozoische Vulkanismus im Tibesti—Gebirge" [Cenozoic Volcanism in the Tibesti Mountains]. Berliner geographische Abhandlungen (in German). 16: 9–34. doi:10.23689/fidgeo-2849.
- Kappen, Josef (1973). "Chapter 10: Response to Extreme Environments". In Ahmadjian, Vernon; Hale, Mason E. (eds.). The Lichens. Elsevier. doi:10.1016/B978-0-12-044950-7.50015-5. ISBN 978-0-12-044950-7.
- Klitzsch, Eberhard H. (2004). "From Bardai to SFB 69: The Tibesti Research Station and Later Geoscientific Research in Northeast Africa" (PDF). Die Erde. 135 (3–4): 245–266. ISSN 0013-9998. Archived from the original (PDF) on May 26, 2013.
- Kröpelin, Stefan (July 4, 2017). "UNESCO Sites: An Opportunity for Chad" (Interview). Interviewed by Frederike Müller. Deutsche Welle. Archived from the original on July 31, 2020.
- L., A. (1876). "Voyages du Dr Nachtigall" [Voyages of Dr. Nachtigal]. Le Globe. Revue genevoise de géographie (in French). 15: 167–178. doi:10.3406/globe.1876.4503. Archived from the original on December 9, 2020.
- Leadbeater, Chris (August 11, 2019). "The most beautiful country in the world that you're not supposed to visit". The Telegraph. Archived from the original on November 11, 2020.
- Mahjoub, A. Monem (2015). Uncharted Ethnicities (PDF). Translated by Mathlouthi, Othman. Tanit. Archived (PDF) from the original on February 17, 2021.
- Maley, Jean (2000). "Last Glacial Maximum lacustrine and fluviatile Formations in the Tibesti and other Saharan mountains, and large-scale climatic teleconnections linked to the activity of the Subtropical Jet Stream". Global and Planetary Change. 26 (1–3): 121–136. Bibcode:2000GPC....26..121M. doi:10.1016/S0921-8181(00)00039-4.
- Maoundonodji, Gilbert (2009). Les enjeux géopolitiques et géostrategiques de l'exploitation du pétrole au Tchad [The geopolitical and geostrategic issues of the exploitation of oil in Chad] (in French). Presses universitaires de Louvain. ISBN 978-2-87463-171-9.
- Messerli, Bruno (1973). "Problems of vertical and horizontal arrangement in the high mountains of the extreme arid zone (central Sahara)". Arctic and Alpine Research. 5 (3): A139–A147. doi:10.1080/00040851.1973.12003727. ISSN 0004-0851. JSTOR 1550163.
- Metz, Helen Chapin (1989). Libya: A Country Study (PDF). Library of Congress. LCCN 88600480. Archived (PDF) from the original on February 21, 2021.
- Mies, Bruno; Lösch, Rainer (1995). "Relative habitat constancy of lichens on the atlantic islands". Cryptogamic Botany. 5: 192–198.
- Ministère des Affaires étrangères et du Développement international, direction des Archives (pôle géographique) (December 2016). Tchad [Chad] (Map) (in French). Ministry of Europe and Foreign Affairs. Archived from the original on April 21, 2021.
- Musch, Tilman (2021). "Exploring Environments through Water: An Ethno-Hydrography of the Tibesti Mountains (Central Sahara)". Ethnobiology Letters. 12 (1): 1–11. doi:10.14237/ebl.12.1.2021.1709. S2CID 231814001.
- "Nine extraordinary tours to Africa's unlikeliest destinations". Wanderlust. November 18, 2019. Archived from the original on May 6, 2020.
- Nolutshungu, Sam C. (1995). Limits of Anarchy: Intervention and State Formation in Chad. University of Virginia Press. ISBN 978-0-8139-1628-6.
- Oliver, Roland Anthony (1975). Fage, John D.; Clark, John Desmond; Oliver, Roland Anthony (eds.). The Cambridge History of Africa (PDF). Vol. 2. Cambridge University Press. Archived (PDF) from the original on August 26, 2020.
- Pegram, William J.; Register, Joseph K. Jr.; Fullagar, Paul D.; Ghuma, Mohamed A.; Rogers, John J. W. (1976). "Pan-African ages from a Tibesti Massif batholith, southern Libya". Earth and Planetary Science Letters. 30 (1): 123–128. Bibcode:1976E&PSL..30..123P. doi:10.1016/0012-821X(76)90014-5.
- Permenter, Jason L.; Oppenheimer, Clive (2007). "Volcanoes of the Tibesti massif (Chad, northern Africa)". Bulletin of Volcanology. 69 (6): 609–626. Bibcode:2007BVol...69..609P. doi:10.1007/s00445-006-0098-x. S2CID 53463999.
- Pollack, Kenneth M. (2004). Arabs at War: Military Effectiveness, 1948-1991. Bison Books. ASIN B003NHSEK0.
- Ricciardi, Matthew M. (1992). "Title to the Aouzou Strip: A Legal and Historical Analysis". The Yale Journal of International Law. 17 (2): 301–488. Archived from the original on March 2, 2021.
- Room, Adrian (2006). Placenames of the World (2nd ed.). McFarland. ISBN 978-0-7864-2248-7.
- Roos, Christian; Knauf, Sascha; Chuma, Idrissa S.; Maille, Audrey; Callou, Cécile; Sabin, Richard; Portela Miguez, Roberto; Zinner, Dietmar (2021). "New mitogenomic lineages in Papio baboons and their phylogeographic implications". American Journal of Physical Anthropology. 174 (3): 407–417. doi:10.1002/ajpa.24186. PMID 33244782. S2CID 227182800.
- Roure, Gil (April 1, 1939). "Le Tibesti, bastion de notre Afrique Noire" [The Tibesti, bastion of our Black Africa] (PDF). L'Illustration (in French). No. 5013. Archived from the original (PDF) on March 3, 2016.
- Sahelo-Saharan Antelopes Project. Rapport de mission: Prospections des zones prioritaires de conservation pour les Antilopes Sahélo-Sahariennes au Tchad, et identification de programmes de conservation/développement durable (PDF) (in French). Bonn Convention. Archived from the original (PDF) on May 21, 2013.
- Salam, Mustafa J.; Hammuda, Omar S.; Eliagoubi, Bahlul A. (1991). The Geology of Libya, Volume 5. Elsevier. ISBN 978-0-444-88844-0.
- Salvador, Alfredo (1996). "Amphibians of Northwest Africa". Smithsonian Herpetological Information Service. 109 (109): 1–43. doi:10.5479/si.23317515.109.1.
- Schultze-Motel, Wolfram (1969). "Eine Moossammlung Aus Dem Tibesti-Gebirge (Nordafrika)" [A Collection of Bryophytes from the Tibesti Mountains (North Africa)]. Willdenowia (in German). 5 (2): 217–220. JSTOR 3995401.
- Scott, Doug (2017). The Ogre: Biography of a Mountain and the Dramatic Story of the First Ascent. Vertebrate Publishing. ISBN 978-1-911342-80-9.
- Shoup, John A. (2011). Ethnic Groups of Africa and the Middle East: An Encyclopedia. ABC-CLIO. ISBN 978-1-59884-362-0.
- Sola, M.A.; Worsley, David, eds. (2000). Geological Exploration in Murzuq Basin. Elsevier. ISBN 978-0-08-053246-2.
- Soulié-Märsche, Ingeborg; Bieda, Stephen; Lafond, R.; Maley, Jean; M'Baitoudji, Mathieu; Vincent, Pierre M.; Faure, Hugues (2010). "Charophytes as bio-indicators for lake level high stand at 'Trou au Natron', Tibesti, Chad, during the Late Pleistocene". Global and Planetary Change. 72 (4): 334–340. Bibcode:2010GPC....72..334S. doi:10.1016/j.gloplacha.2010.05.004.
- Steele, Peter R. (1964). "A Note on Tieroko (Tibesti Mountains)" (PDF). Alpine Journal. 69 (308–309): 268–270. Archived (PDF) from the original on July 17, 2020.
- Suayah, Ismail B.; Miller, Jonathan S.; Miller, Brent V.; Bayer, Tovah M.; Rogers, John J.W. (2006). "Tectonic significance of Late Neoproterozoic granites from the Tibesti massif in southern Libya inferred from Sr and Nd isotopes and U–Pb zircon data". Journal of African Earth Sciences. 44 (4–5): 561–570. Bibcode:2006JAfES..44..561S. doi:10.1016/j.jafrearsci.2005.11.020.
- Thesiger, Wilfred (1939). "A Camel Journey to Tibesti". The Geographical Journal. 94 (6): 433–446. Bibcode:1939GeogJ..94..433T. doi:10.2307/1787293. JSTOR 1787293.
- Thompson, Greg (September 3, 2020). "Stations". National Center for Atmospheric Research. Archived from the original on January 28, 2021.
- Tilho, Jean (1920). Carte provisoire de la région Tibesti. Borkou, Erdi, Ennedi, (mission de l'Institut de France, 1912–1917) [Provisional map of the Tibesti region. Borkou, Erdi, Ennedi, (mission of the Institut de France, 1912–1917)] (Map) (in French). Institut de France. Archived from the original on June 9, 2014.
- Tourte, René (2005). Histoire de la recherche agricole en Afrique tropicale francophone [History of agricultural research in French tropical Africa] (PDF) (in French). Vol. I: Aux sources de l'agriculture africaine: de la Préhistoire au Moyen Âge. Food and Agriculture Organization. ISBN 978-92-5-205407-8. Archived (PDF) from the original on April 20, 2021.
- Tubiana, Jérôme (February 24, 2016). "After Libya, a Rush for Gold and Guns". Foreign Affairs.
- Tubiana, Jérôme; Gramizzi, Claudio (June 2017). Tubu Trouble: State and Statelessness in the Chad–Sudan–Libya Triangle (PDF) (Report). Small Arms Survey. Archived (PDF) from the original on October 23, 2020.
- University of Cologne (June 2, 2015). "Scientific Exploration of the Tibesti Mountains: Cologne Researcher Headed Mission to the Peaks of the Sahara Desert". Science Daily. Archived from the original on January 25, 2016.
- White, Frank (1998) [1986]. La Végétation de l'Afrique: Mémoire accompagnant la carte de végétation de l'Afrique [The Vegetation of Africa: Report accompanying a vegetation map of Africa] (PDF) (in French). Institut de recherche pour le développement. ISBN 978-2-7099-0832-0. Archived (PDF) from the original on August 4, 2019.
- "Zum Weinen" [Makes You Cry]. Der Spiegel (in German). September 15, 1975. Archived from the original on April 15, 2019.
