= Tarso Emi Chi =

Volcano in northern Chad

- Location within Chad

Highest point
- Elevation: 3,376 m (11,076 ft)
- Coordinates: 21.22°N 18.52°E

Tarso Emi Chi (tarso: "gentle mountain, high plateau"; emi: "large mountain"; named by the Toubou) is a volcano in Chad.

Tarso Emi Chi is part of the Tibesti Mountains, a group of volcanic mountains that cover a surface area of 100,000 square kilometres (39,000 sq mi) and reach an elevation of 3,394 metres (11,135 ft). The mountains consist of both a Precambrian crystalline rocks and volcanic rocks.

The volcano consists of a lava plateau that originated in a number of vents, which form a number of volcanic cones. It covers a surface of about 70 by 110 kilometres (43 mi × 68 mi) in the northeastern Tibesti mountains, with a steep drop towards the east and the north and gentler slopes in the south and west. Summits in the volcano include Boubou, Chebedo, Godoon, Kazena Lulli, Kégueur Tédi, Mouskorbé, Tarso Adar, Tarso Aozi, Tarso Chididemi, Tarso Goziydi, Tarso Kozen and Tarso Toudougou. Of these Mouskorbé reaches a height of 3,376 metres (11,076 ft).

Tarso Emi Chi has erupted a number of volcanic series such as the "black series" and the "white series", which consist of basaltic andesite, rhyolite and trachyte. Syenite intrusions have been found as well, the black series consist mainly of basalt. The "white series" is usually more heavily eroded than the "black series".

There is no evidence of historical eruptions at Tarso Emi Chi, but volcanic products overlie diatom beds of former lakes.

== Vegetation, ice and water ==
Block glaciers developed on Mouskorbe, the largest of which is 2 kilometres (1.2 mi) long on the south flank and ends at 2,100–2,300 metres (6,900–7,500 ft) elevation. There is widespread evidence of nivation landforms on Mouskorbe above 2,700 metres (8,900 ft) and especially above 3,000 metres (9,800 ft). Presently, precipitation at Mouskorbe is about 100–150 millimetres per year (3.9–5.9 in/year).

Former lakes in Tarso Emi Chi were inhabited by snails such as Euconulus fulvus, Limnea trunculata, Succinea pfeifferi and Zonitoides nitidus, as well as by diatoms, grasses and reeds. Further, Mouskorbe was part of the Kufrah paleoriver watershed; drainages to the east are very steep, north are steep and step-like and drainages to the west are gentler but have still developed deep canyons. Presently, acacias grow up to elevations of 2,200 metres (7,200 ft).
