= Tarso Voon =

Stratovolcano in the Republic of Chad

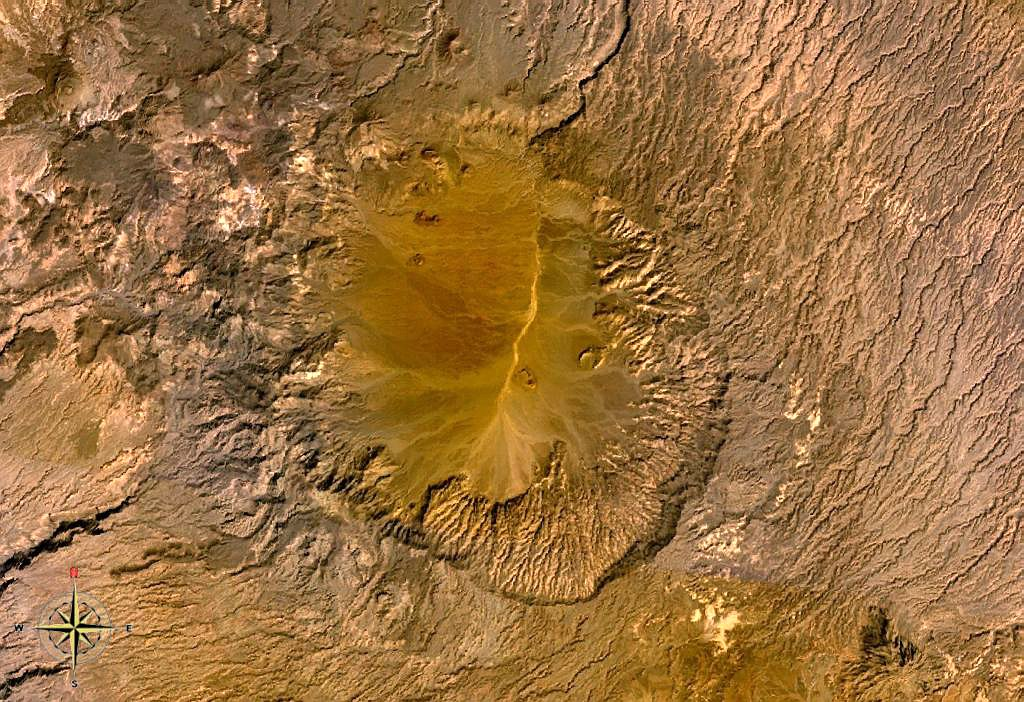
- Tarso Voon seen from space

Highest point
- Elevation: 3,100 m (10,200 ft)
- Coordinates: 20°55′N 17°17′E

Geography
- Location within Chad
- Location: Chad
- Parent range: Tibesti Mountains

Geology
- Mountain type: Stratovolcano
- Last eruption: Unknown

The Tarso Voon is a 3,100-metre (10,200 ft) high stratovolcano in the north of the Republic of Chad. It is located in the western center of the Tibesti Mountains.

The summit of the mountain is dominated by the 14-by-18-kilometre (8.7 mi × 11.2 mi) relatively flat caldera. Extensive basaltic flows lie on the northeastern side in a 180-degree arc and are a result of the high activity in the Quaternary. In the neighborhood in northwestern direction is the Ehi Mousgau, a stratovolcano with the same elevation, 3,100 metres (10,200 ft) above sea level. Deposits from pyroclastic clouds are found 15 to 35 kilometres (9.3 to 21.7 mi) around the caldera. The mountain was constructed over a basement of Precambrian schists.

The well known Soborom Solfataric field is the largest in the Tibesti Mountains, it is located about 5 kilometres (3.1 mi) west of the summit rim. The active fumaroles, mudpots and hot springs are visited by the people of the Tibesti for medical purposes.

== See also ==
- List of volcanoes in Chad
