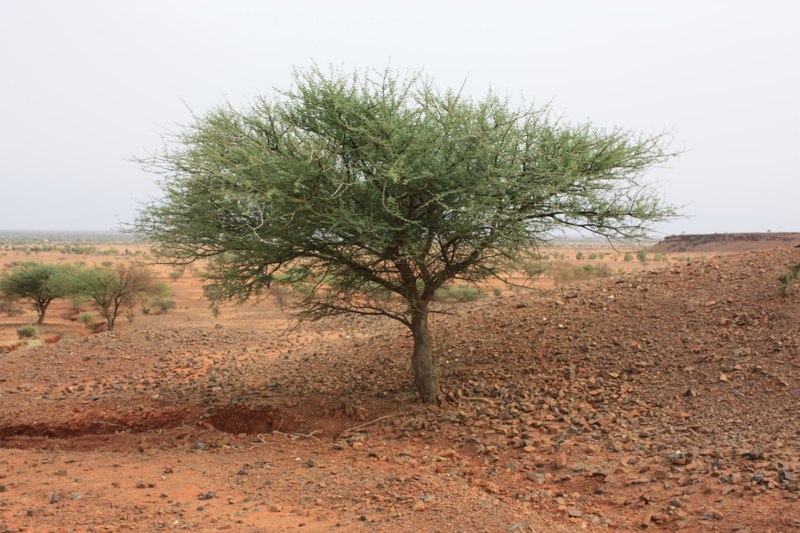
- Senegalia laeta on a hill near Djibo, Burkina Faso

Conservation status
- Least Concern (IUCN 3.1)

Scientific classification
- Kingdom: Plantae
- Clade: Embryophytes
- Clade: Tracheophytes
- Clade: Spermatophytes
- Clade: Angiosperms
- Clade: Eudicots
- Clade: Rosids
- Order: Fabales
- Family: Fabaceae
- Subfamily: Caesalpinioideae
- Clade: Mimosoid clade
- Genus: Senegalia
- Species: S. laeta

Binomial name
- Senegalia laeta (R. Br. ex Benth.) Seigler & Ebinger
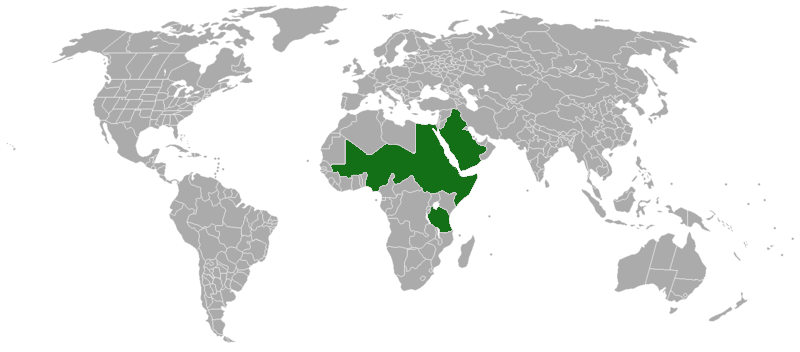
- Countries in which Senegalia laeta occurs

Synonyms
- Acacia laeta R. Br. ex Benth.; Acacia trintigniani A. Chev.

= Senegalia laeta =

Species of plant

Senegalia laeta, the gay acacia or daga, is a legume found in the family Fabaceae. It was formerly included in the genus Acacia.

== Description ==
Senegalia laeta is a perennial shrub or small tree growing to a height of 4–10 m with a greyish-green bark looking blackish from a distance, with a pink slash. The leaves are twice-pinnate, i.e. the pinnate leaves are further divided pinnately, the leaflets are 1–4 cm long, with 2-5 pairs of pinnae and 2-5 pairs of leaflets per pinna; leaflets are oblong and asymmetrical, measuring 6-1.2 x 0.3-0.5 cm, greyish green and almost hairless. These leaves distinguish Senegalia laeta from the related sympatric species such as Senegalia dudgeoni, Senegalia senegal, Senegalia gourmaensis and Senegalia mellifera by its leaves. The thorns are paired and consist of recurved axillary prickles, with an occasional a third prickle recurved forward, if the third thorn is absent it is normally replaced with a leaf. The flowers are creamy white and very fragrant, with three flowers set on a stalk with multiple stalks growing on a spike. The pale brown leathery pods are pointed, whereas those of Seneglia senegal are not and this character is an easy feature to distinguish these Senegalia laeta from that species.

== Distribution ==
Senegalia laeta is native to Africa, including the Sahara as far south as Tanzania, the Middle East, and Western Asia.

== Uses ==
Parts of the tree are used for dyestuff. The tree is used for fodder; the foliage and seed pods make good forage for livestock and the tree stands up well to this use.

It produces an edible gum which is used to make gum arabic but is not as good quality as the gum Arabic extracted from Senegalia senegal. It is harvested at the end of the rainy season when the gum is exuded from the bark and branches and collected by scraping, the bark is sometimes cut to increase production. Other uses to which Senegalia laeta is put are as fuel-wood and charcoal, browse for domestic animals, dead fencing for bomas, poles, fence-posts. The bark from the trunk is used for making ropes and repairing calabashes, and in medicine it is considered to have analgesic properties. It is also used to soften hides before tanning. It is drought tolerant and has been successfully planted in reafforestation programmes.

== Taxonomy ==
Formerly included in the genus Acacia it has now been reassigned with many African species of acacia to the genus Senegalia. The specific name laeta is the feminine of laetus and means "joyful, cheerful, happy" in Latin.
