= Bagana =

Volcanic cone in the country of Papua New Guinea

Mt Bagana
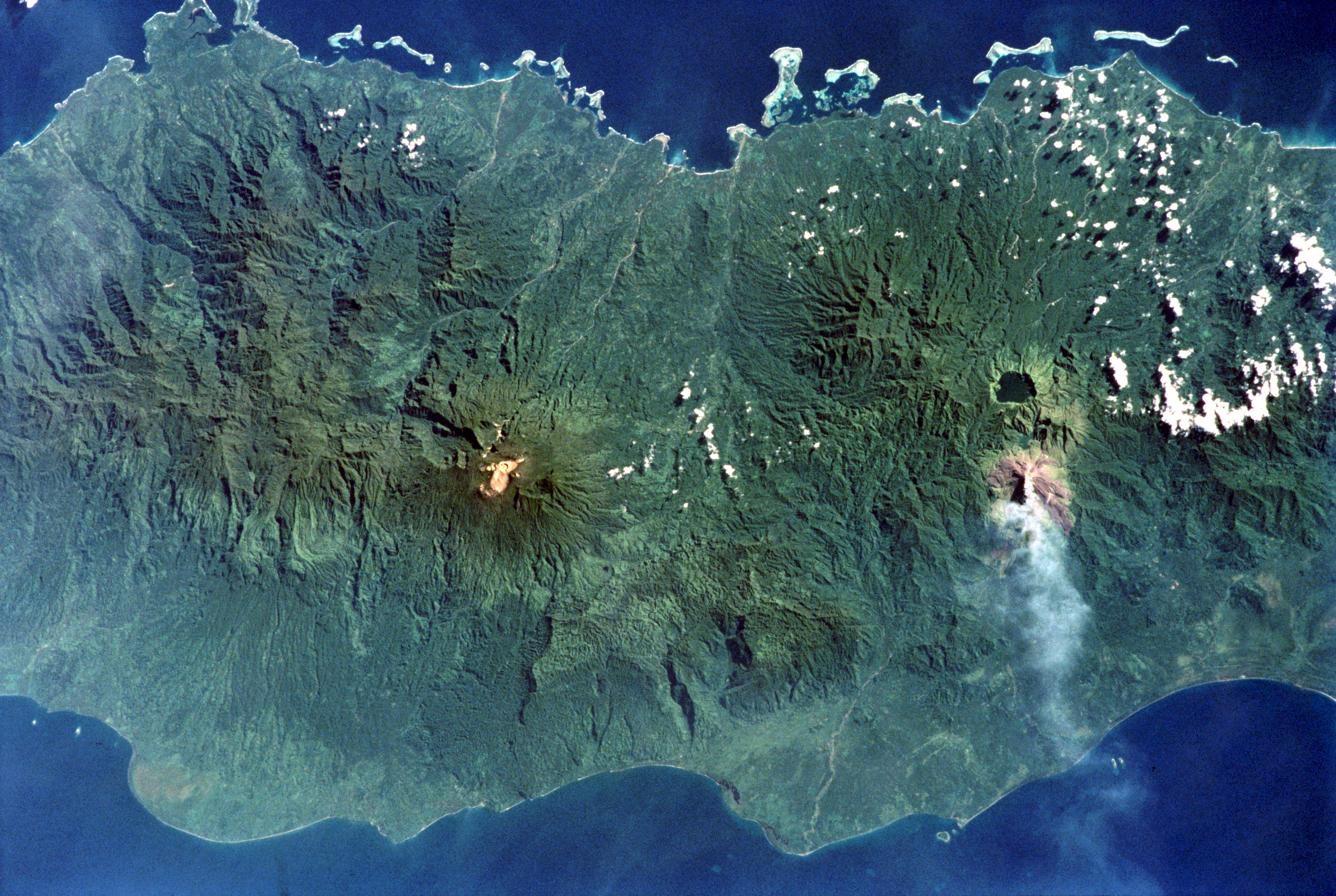
- An ash plume originating from Bagana at right, just below the dark-colored caldera lake of Billy Mitchell

Highest point
- Elevation: 1,893 m (6,211 ft)
- Prominence: 1,010 m (3,310 ft)
- Listing: Ribu
- Coordinates: 6.140°S 155.195°E

Geography
- Location within Papua New Guinea
- Location: Bougainville, Papua New Guinea
- Parent range: Emperor Range

Geology
- Mountain type: Lava cone
- Last eruption: 2000 to 2025 (ongoing)

Bagana is an active volcanic cone located in the centre of the island of Bougainville, Papua New Guinea, the largest island of the Solomon group. It is the most active volcano in the country, occupying a remote portion of central Bougainville Island. It is one of Melanesia's youngest and most active volcanoes.

Bagana is a massive symmetrical, roughly 1893m-high lava cone largely constructed by an accumulation of viscous andesitic lava flows. The entire lava cone could have been constructed in about 300 years at its present rate of lava production. Eruptive activity at Bagana is frequent and is characterized by non-explosive effusion of viscous lava that maintains a small lava dome in the summit crater, although explosive activity occasionally producing pyroclastic flows also occurs. Lava flows form dramatic, freshly preserved tongue-shaped lobes up to 50 m thick with prominent levees that descend the volcano's flanks on all sides.

Just north-east of Bagana is the volcano crater lake Billy Mitchell. Bagana is one of 17 post-Miocene stratovolcanoes on Bougainville. U.S. General Floyd L. Parks flew over the Solomon Islands on 27 October 1948 and witnessed the eruption of Bagana. His photographs of Bagana erupting were published in the magazine Life.

== See also ==
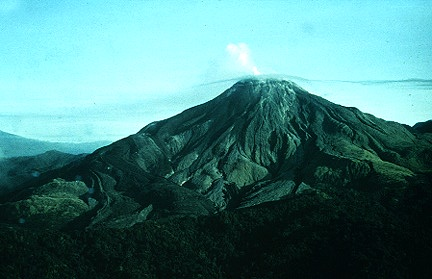
Bagana Volcano

- List of volcanoes in Papua New Guinea
