= Loloru =

Volcano in Papua New Guinea

- Location within Papua New Guinea

Highest point
- Elevation: 1,887 m (6,191 ft)
- Coordinates: 6°31′S 155°37′E

Geography
- Location: Bougainville, Papua New Guinea

Geology
- Mountain type(s): Pyroclastic shield, stratovolcano
- Last eruption: 1050 BCE (?)

Loloru is a pyroclastic shield volcano located in the southern region of Bougainville Island, within the Autonomous Region of Bougainville of northeastern Papua New Guinea.

The volcano's summit consists of two nested calderas, with an andesitic lava dome.

== Lake Loloru ==
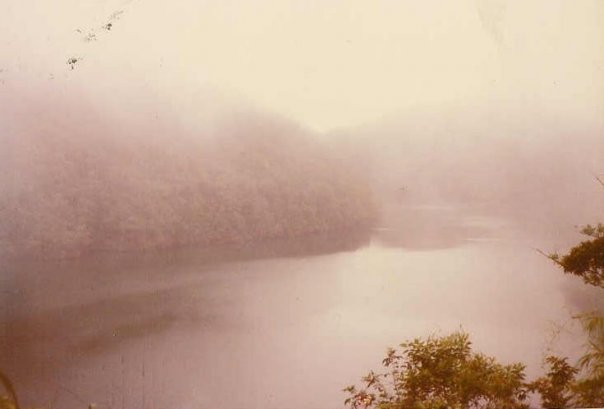
Traditionally sacred Lake Loloru, a volcanic crater lake.

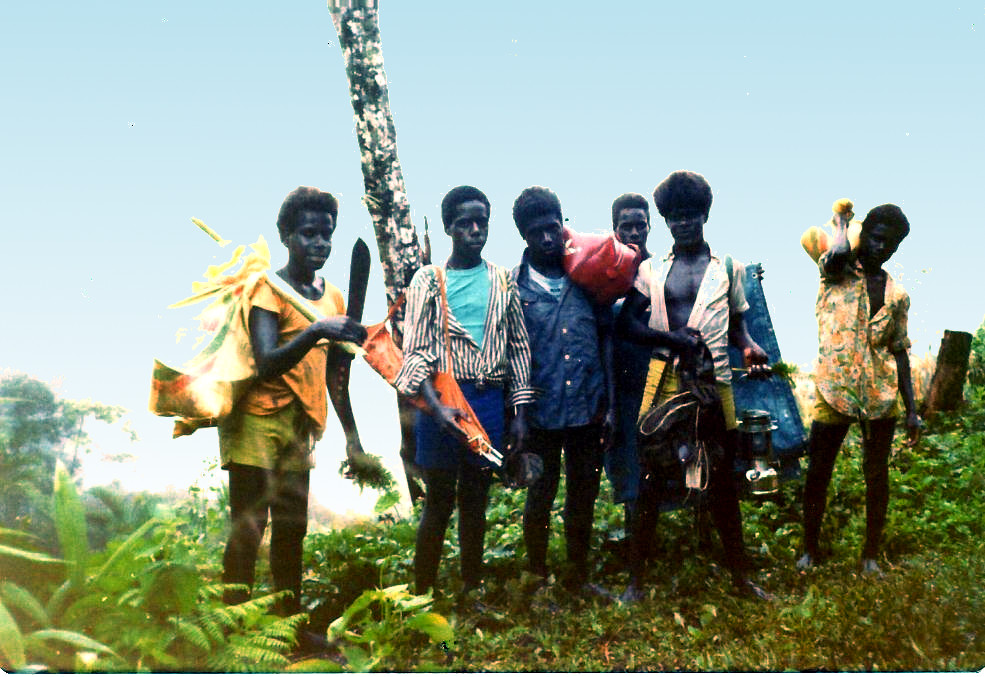
Boys from Buin and Siwai visiting Lake Loloru (1978).

Lake Loloru is a crescent-shaped volcanic crater lake covering 0.9 km^{2} (0.35 sq mi) within the volcano caldera. It is a sacred place of South Bougainvillians, who traditionally believe the souls of their dead go here upon death.

== See also ==
- Volcanoes of Bougainville Island
- List of volcanoes in Papua New Guinea
