= Pyroclastic shield =

Shield volcano formed mostly of pyroclastic and highly explosive eruptions

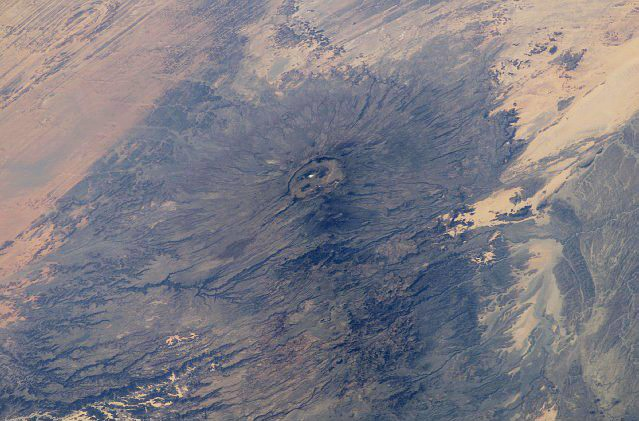
Emi Koussi seen from International Space Station

In volcanology, a pyroclastic shield or ignimbrite shield is an uncommon type of shield volcano. Unlike most shield volcanoes, pyroclastic shields are formed mostly of pyroclastic and highly explosive eruptions rather than relatively fluid basaltic lava issuing from vents or fissures on the surface of the volcano. They typically display low-angle flank slopes and often have a central caldera caused by large eruptions. Lava is commonly extruded after explosive activity has ended. The paucity of associated Plinian fall deposits indicates that pyroclastic shields are characterized by low Plinian columns.

Pyroclastic shields are commonly known to form in the Central Andes of South America, as well as in Melanesia (the island of Bougainville alone has two). There are also pyroclastic shields in Africa, such as Emi Koussi in Chad.

== Examples ==
- Ambrym, Vanuatu
- Apoyeque, Nicaragua
- Masaya, Nicaragua
- Billy Mitchell, Bougainville, Papua New Guinea
- Emi Koussi, Chad
- Laguna Colorada, Bolivia
- Loloru, Bougainville, Papua New Guinea
- Cerro Panizos, Bolivia
- Purico Complex, Chile
- Rabaul Volcano, New Britain, Papua New Guinea
- Sacabaya, Bolivia
- Mount Shiribetsu, Hokkaido, Japan
- Tata Sabaya, Bolivia
- Taal Volcano, Philippines
- Hofsjökull, Iceland - initially built from basaltic lava, but may have transitioned to highly viscous lava.

== See also ==
- Stratovolcano – Type of conical volcano composed of layers of lava and tephra
- Pyroclastic fall – Deposit of material ejected from a volcanic eruption

Categories:

- Pyroclastic cones
