= Emi Koussi =

High pyroclastic shield volcano in the Sahara

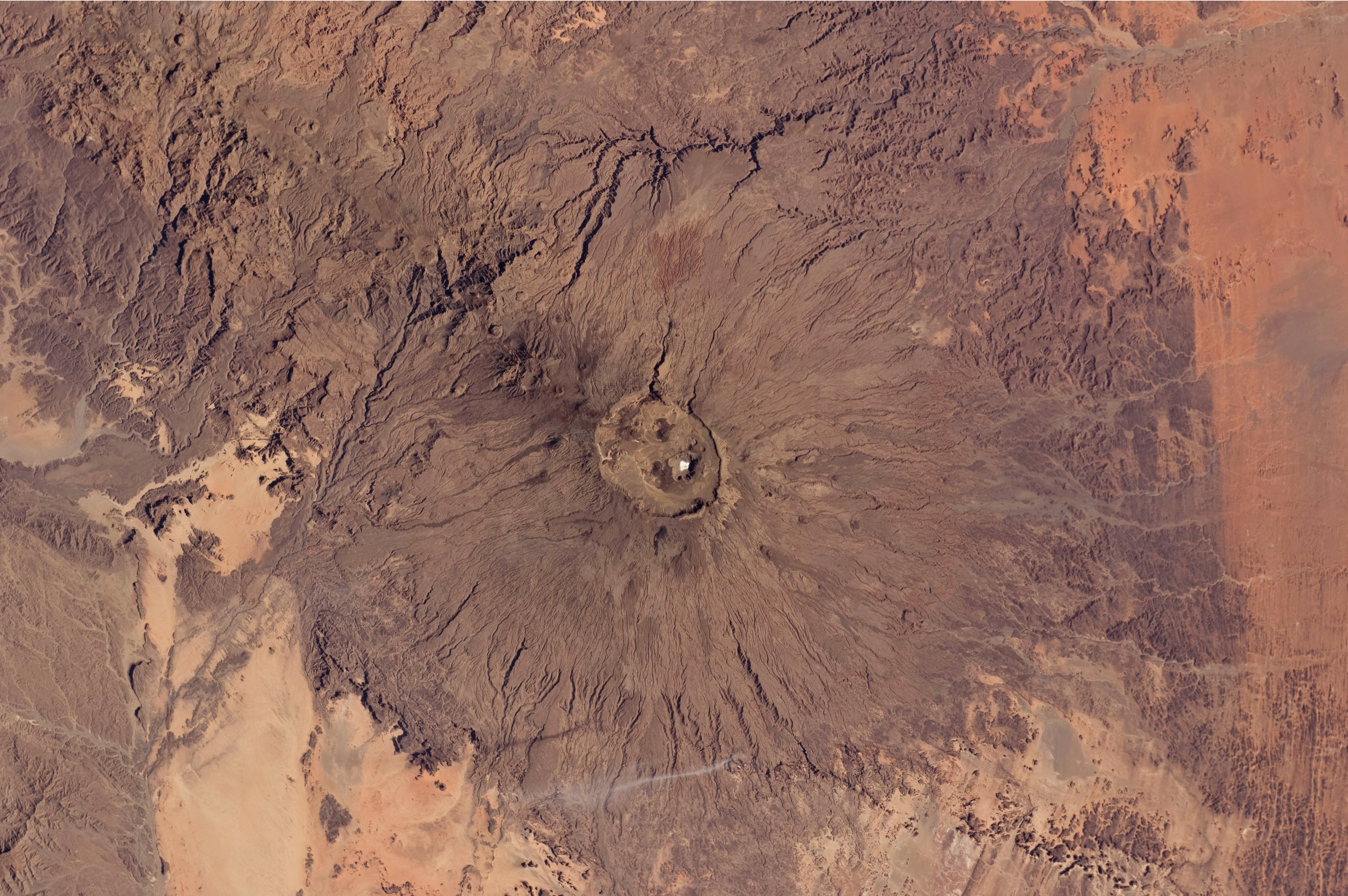
- Emi Koussi seen from space

Highest point
- Elevation: 3,447 m (11,309 ft)
- Prominence: 2,934 m (9,626 ft); Ranked 104th
- Listing: Country high point Ultra; Ribu
- Coordinates: 19°47′33″N 18°32′47″E

Geography
- Location within Chad
- Location: Chad
- Parent range: Tibesti Mountains

Geology
- Rock age: Holocene
- Mountain type: Pyroclastic shield
- Last eruption: unknown

Climbing
- Easiest route: Hike

Emi Koussi (Arabic: إيمي كوسي, romanised: Īmī Kūsī), also known as Emi Koussou, is a high pyroclastic shield volcano that lies at the southeast end of the Tibesti Mountains in the central Sahara, in the northern Borkou Region of northern Chad. The highest mountain of the Sahara, the volcano is one of several in the Tibesti range, and reaches an elevation of 3,447 metres (11,309 ft), rising 3 km (1.9 mi) above the surrounding sandstone plains. The volcano is 60–70 kilometres (37–43 mi) wide and has a volume of 2,500 cubic kilometres (600 cu mi).

Two nested calderas cap the volcano, the outer one being about 15 by 11 kilometres (9.3 mi × 6.8 mi) in size. Within it on the southeast side is a smaller caldera known as Era Kohor, about 2 kilometres (1.2 mi) wide and 350 metres (1,150 ft) deep. Numerous lava domes, cinder cones, maars, and lava flows are found within the calderas and along the outer flanks of the shield. Era Kohor contains trona deposits, and Emi Koussi has been studied as an analogue of the Martian volcano Elysium Mons. Emi Koussi was active more than one million years ago, but some eruptions may be more recent, and there is ongoing fumarolic and hot spring activity.

== Geography and geomorphology ==
Emi Koussi lies in Chad, Africa, and is part of the Tibesti Mountains as well as its highest peak and thus of the Sahara; many peaks of the Tibesti exceed 2,000 metres (6,600 ft) in height. These mountains are formed by a group of volcanoes that grew on top of a large dome of Earth's surface. Volcanism in this area is poorly studied; as the region is remote and access difficult for political reasons. Dirt roads cross the western and eastern margins of the summit caldera, and according to historical reports the Tibu people lived in its summit caldera and in artificial caves. In the Tedaga language, Emi means "mountains", "massif". The mountain has played an important role in the research and discovery history of the Tibesti.

Emi Koussi rises to a height of 3,415 metres (11,204 ft) on the southern side of the volcano, rising between <1 kilometre (0.62 mi) and 3 kilometres (1.9 mi) above the surrounding terrain and forming the highest summit of the Sahara. It is considered by some astronauts to be the most recognizable landmark on Earth, as seen from orbit. Supposedly the entire Tibesti can be seen from the northern summits.

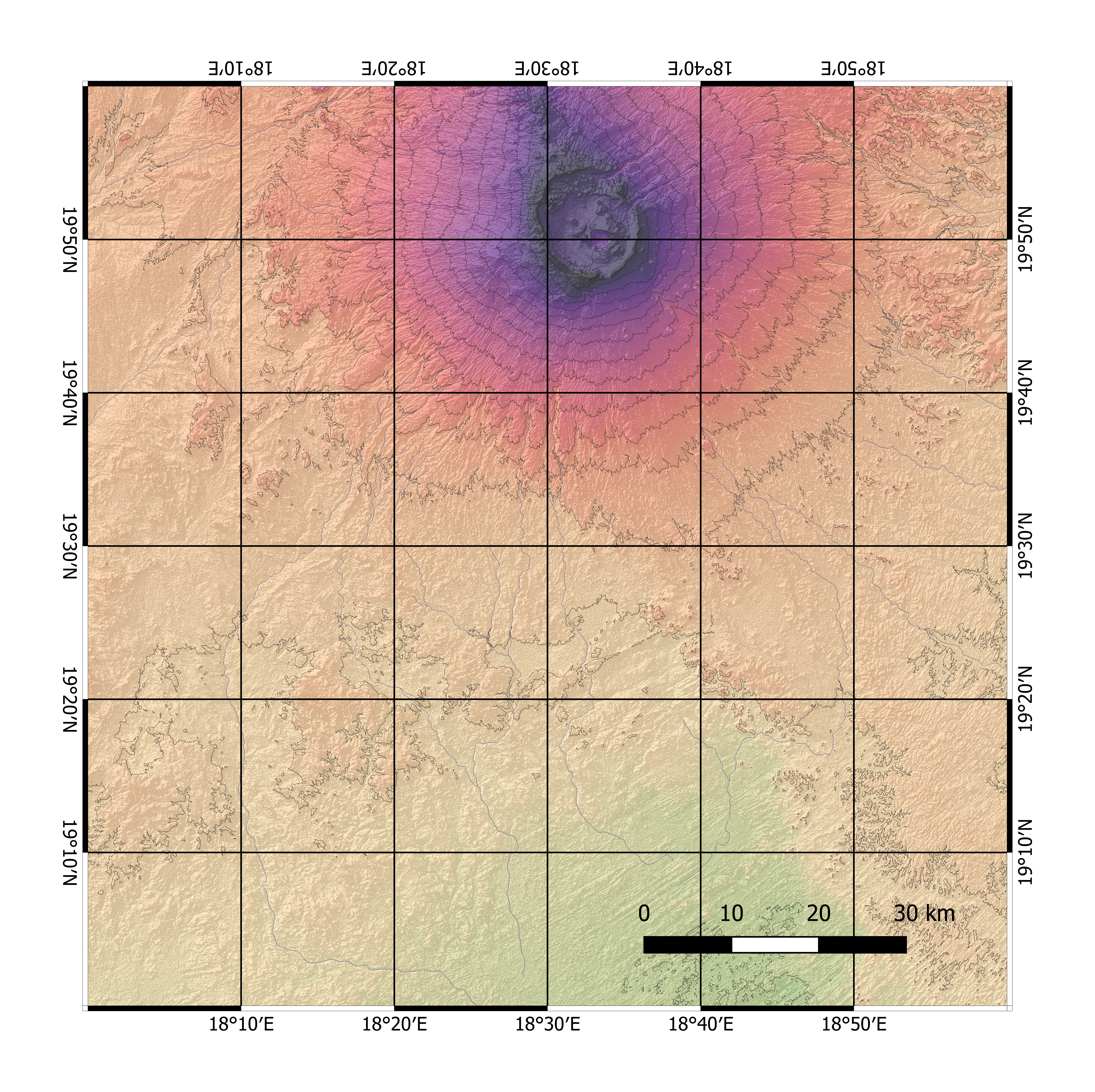
Topographic map of the Emi Koussi

It is a shield volcano with a diameter of 60–70 kilometres (37–43 mi) or 60–80 kilometres (37–50 mi) and an estimated volume of 150–2,500 km^{3} (36–600 mi^{3}). The summit of Emi Koussi is formed by two overlapping calderas, which together form a 15-by-11-kilometre (9.3 mi × 6.8 mi) wide elliptical caldera that extends from northwest to southeast. The northern caldera formed first, then the southern caldera which is about 50 metres (160 ft) deeper below the northern one. 400–300-metre (1,310–980 ft) high scarps form the inner margin of the southern caldera, with the floor at an elevation of 2,970 metres (9,740 ft). Before the formation of the calderas, the volcano may have reached a height of 4,000 metres (13,000 ft). Emi Koussi has been compared to a Martian volcano, Elysium Mons. The caldera rim is cut by one outlet, the Porte de Modiounga, from which gorges emanate into the caldera. The highest point of Emi Koussi lies on the southern rim of the caldera.

Nested within this combined caldera is the Era Kohor caldera, which is 300 metres (980 ft) deep and 2 kilometres (1.2 mi) wide, having the appearance of a giant hole. This caldera is also known as Natron Hole or Trou au Natron. Trachytic lava flows are exposed in its walls, and sodium carbonate has been deposited on its floor, which lies at an elevation of 2,670 metres (8,760 ft) and contains a salt lake. The floor of Era Kohor is thus deep white. Three maars and several scoria cones are also nested within the combined caldera, along with lava domes and lava flows. Debris from explosive eruptions fills the calderas.

The Kohor pumices and two sets of ignimbrites cover the flanks of Emi Koussi, which steepen as they approach the summit. Scoria cones on the slopes are accompanied by lava flows. On the upper sectors of the volcano, lavas are crisscrossed by cracks, which are known as "lappiaz". Sandstone crops out on the terrain surrounding the volcano. North of Emi Koussi lie other volcanoes, such as Tarso Ahon and Tarso Emi Chi, the former of which is connected to Emi Koussi by a narrow ridge.

== Geology ==
Tectonic activity appears to have occurred in the Tibesti already between the Carboniferous and the Cretaceous, that is between 358.9 ± 0.4 and 66 million years ago. During the earliest stage of volcanism on Tibesti, alkali basalts formed large plateaus. Later, the central volcanoes developed on top of these plateaus. Volcanism in Tibesti has been explained with a mantle plume, as has been proposed for other African volcanoes, although recently tectonic effects of the collision between Africa and Europe and their effects at a distance have also been advanced as an explanation.

The oldest rocks below the Tibesti are Precambrian diorites, granites and schists, which are probably of Neoproterozoic age and are differentiated into two units. The volcanic rocks rest on an uplifted basement formed by Cretaceous and Paleozoic sandstone. The latter crop out at the southwestern foot of Emi Koussi, while volcanic rocks dominate north of the volcano, and the Tibesti massif is prevalent east and southeast of Emi Koussi. Older volcanic rocks are exposed in valleys.

Emi Koussi has erupted phonolite, trachyandesite and trachyte, as well as mafic rocks like basanite and tephrite. The erupted rocks define two alkaline suites. Phenocryst chemistry and content varies between the various rocks; among the minerals are alkali feldspar, amphibole, biotite, clinopyroxene, olivine, oxides and plagioclase. Alkali feldspar, apatite, clinopyroxene, olivine, magnetite, mica, nepheline, oxides, plagioclase, quartz, sodalite, titanite and zircon also form the groundmass of microliths in erupted rocks. Magma genesis mainly involved fractional crystallization processes. Rocks from Emi Koussi were used as raw material by Neolithic societies of the region.

Until 5,400 years ago during the African humid period (Holocene), Era Kohor was filled with a 4.1 square kilometres (1.6 sq mi) lake whose water reached a depth of 130 metres (430 ft) and a volume of 0.45 cubic kilometres (0.11 cu mi). It was fed in part by water accumulating in the outer caldera and percolating to Era Kohor. Diatom beds have been found 125 metres (410 ft) above the floor of Era Kohor and in depressions without outlet elsewhere in the caldera, they reach thicknesses of 4–5 metres (13–16 ft). Farther down on the mountain, gullies start appearing at 2,800 metres (9,200 ft) elevation and become deep gorges by 2,000–2,500 metres (6,600–8,200 ft) elevation. Elleboe wadi originates on Emi Koussi, and several streams on the western flank join into the Enneri Miski which drains southwards and disappears south of the mountains. Small pools of water are found around Emi Koussi.

== Eruptive history ==
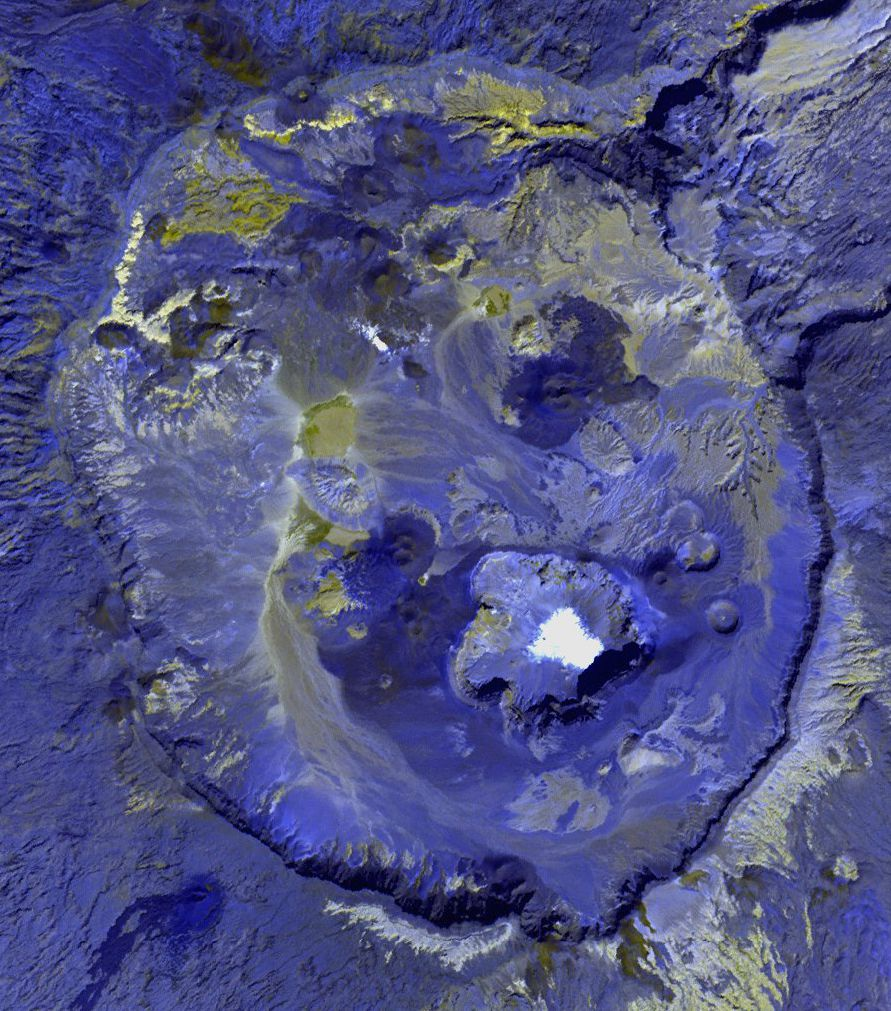
Emi Koussi caldera, ASTER

Emi Koussi erupted between 2.4 and 1.3 million years ago; it is considered to be of Pliocene-Quaternary age. The volcano was constructed mainly during the Miocene within about one million years. Radiometric dating has yielded ages of 2.42±0.03 to 2.33±0.09 million years ago for the oldest Emi Koussi stage. The third stage has yielded ages of 1.4±0.3 to 1.32±0.2 million years ago; formerly Era Kohor was considered to be a Holocene centre.

During the first stage, Emi Koussi erupted trachytes and trachyandesites in the form of ignimbrites and basaltic lapilli. This was followed in the second stage by trachytic, green or grey ignimbrites, trachytic and phonolitic lava domes and additional basaltic lava flows. The second stage ignimbrites can be found within the northern caldera and on the southern flank of the volcano. The third stage was dominantly phonolitic, with breccia, tuffs and ignimbrites including the Kohor ignimbrite. The various ignimbrites contain fiamme and often look like lava flows. Each stage was accompanied by the formation of a caldera, and basaltic volcanism continued through all three stages. Phreatic explosions associated with Era Kohor have deposited large blocks within the summit caldera, including beautifully coloured syenite blocks.

Quaternary volcanism gave rise to the cones on the slopes of Emi Koussi, and the three maars are the most recent vents in the combined caldera, while long lava flows have been interpreted to be the youngest volcanism at Emi Koussi. The most recent volcanic vents show little erosion. Early in the Pleistocene, erosion took place on the flanks of Emi Koussi, and carbonates were deposited in Era Kohor until recent times.

On the southern foot of the volcano, fumaroles are active such as at Yi Yerra at 850 metres (2,790 ft) elevation on the southern flanks. At Yi Yerra, hot springs produce water with temperatures of 37 °C (99 °F). Emi Koussi is considered to be a Holocene volcano. Lava flows have buried Holocene diatoms beds in its caldera; dates of 14790±400 to 12400±400 years before present have been obtained by radiocarbon dating on diatom beds which have been penetrated or buried by lava flows.

== Climate and vegetation ==
The Tibesti mountains feature a desert mountain climate. There are no weather stations close to Emi Koussi and the stations at lower elevations likely underestimate precipitation at higher elevations, but based on cloud cover data, a yearly precipitation of 80–120 millimetres (3.1–4.7 in) has been estimated for Emi Koussi. Precipitation was higher in the past, when the African monsoon expanded over the Sahara and drew moisture from the Mediterranean Sea to the Tibesti, The climate reflects both northerly and southerly influences and is distinct from that of the surrounding deserts. There is no evidence of nivation forms on Emi Koussi and the identification of periglacial landforms is questionable, although periglacial activity likely occurred in the Pleistocene and may continue to the present-day. Even during the Pleistocene, no part of the mountain had sub-freezing temperatures through the entire year.

A number of diatom species have been identified in sediments left by the Era Kohor lake, including Cocconeis placentula, Cyclotella cyclopuncta, Cyclotella ocellata, Cymbella cistula, Cymbella leptoceros, Cymbella muelleri, Epithemia adnata, Fragilaria construens, Fragilaria pinnata, Gomphonema affine, Gomphonema parvulum, Navicula oblonga and Rhopalodia gibba. The diatom fauna appears to be unusual in comparison to other Saharan paleolakes, probably owing to the high elevation of the Emi Koussi lake. Cattail and water milfoil grew around the lake.

Generally, in the Tibesti vegetation occurs in five different belts depending on elevation. On Emi Koussi, Erica arborea is found up to elevations of 2,900 metres (9,500 ft), in the past it was probably more widespread. The summit region features montane vegetation, including Artemisia-Ephedra steppes which cover large parts of the caldera floor. The lava flows high on the mountain have characteristic environmental traits which allow the development of a particular vegetation. This vegetation encompasses Dichrocephala, Eragrostis, Erodium, Helichrysum as well as ferns, liverworts and mosses. Oldenlandia and Selaginella species grow at fumaroles. The caldera floor was used as a pasture for camels and goats.

The wood rush Luzula tibestica is endemic on Emi Koussi. The fern Asplenium quezelii was discovered on Emi Koussi and at first thought to be endemic there before it was found to be identical to Asplenium daghestanicum, a species also previously considered to be endemic to Dagestan, more than 3,800 kilometres (2,400 mi) away from Emi Koussi.

== Gallery ==
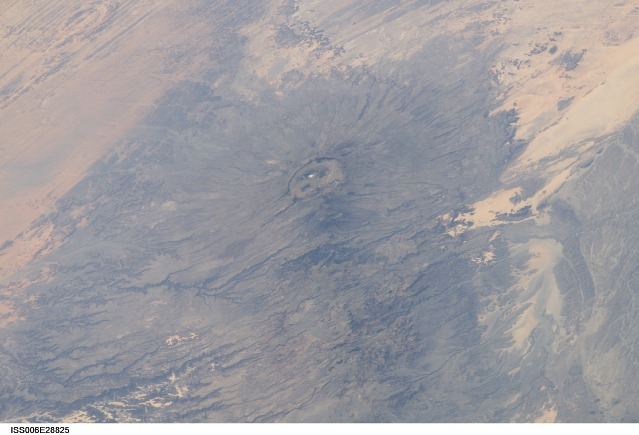
Another view of it from space

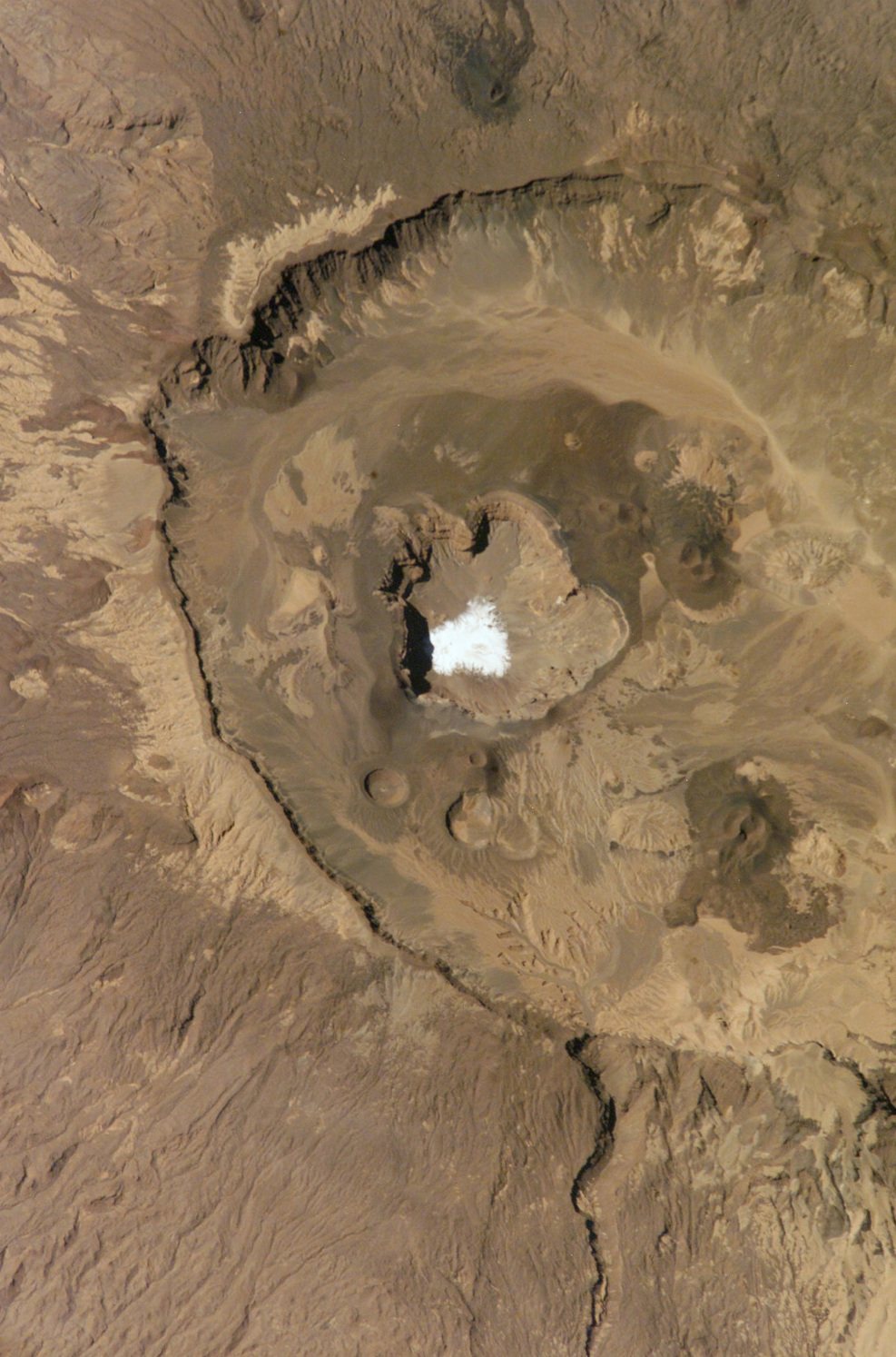
Calderas of Emi Koussi

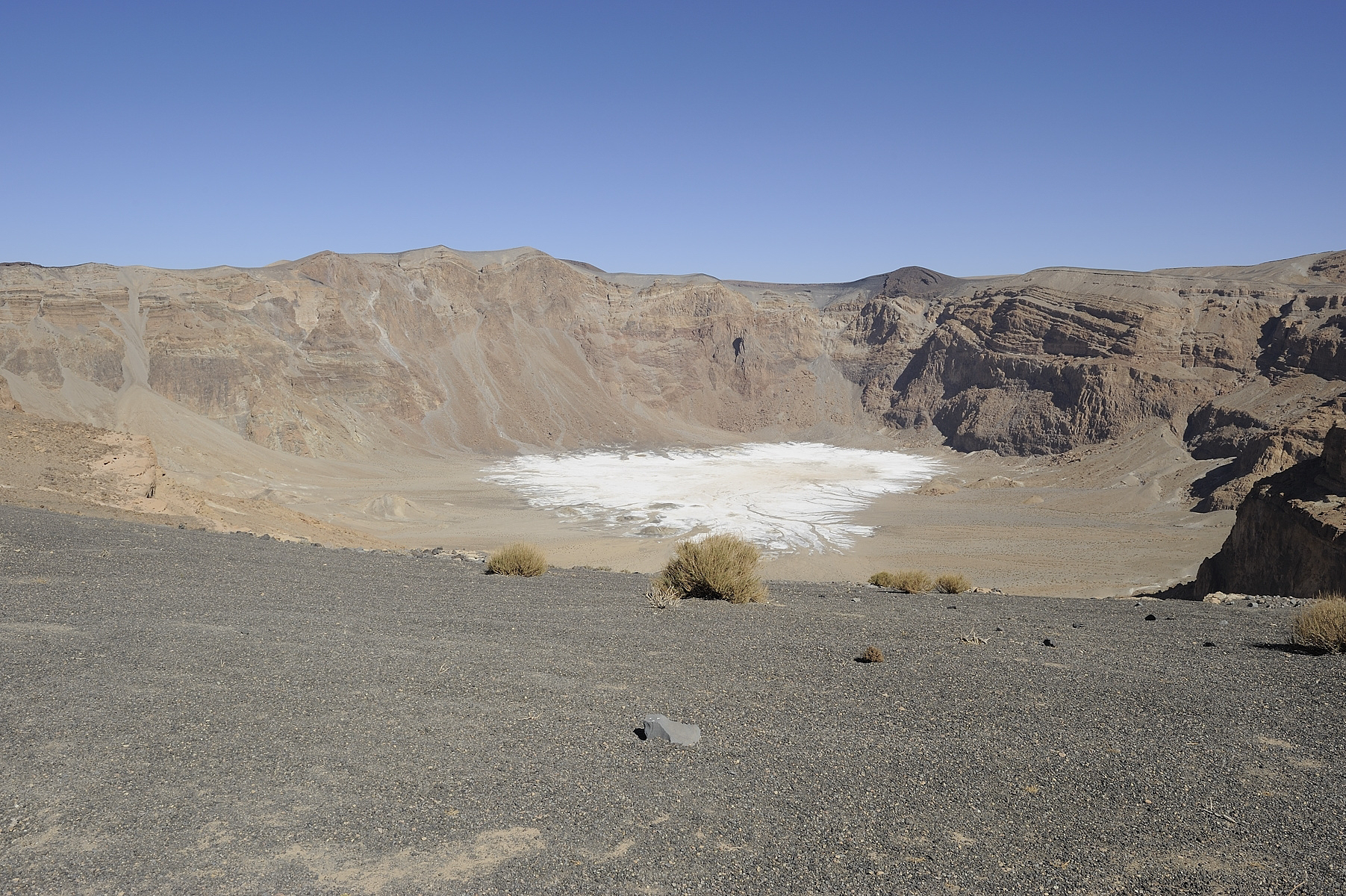
Emi Koussi inner crater

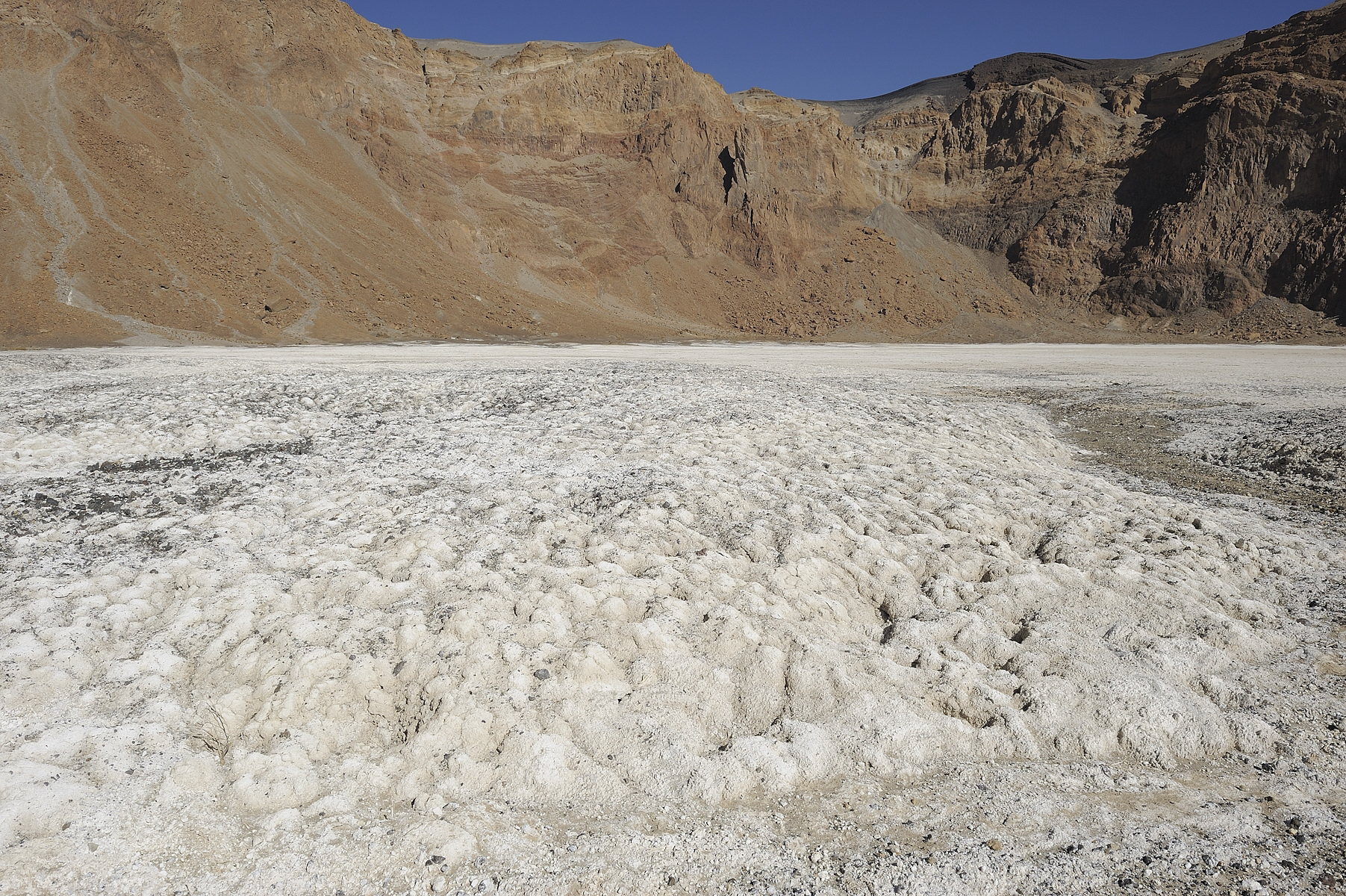
Natron in the inner caldera of Emi Koussi

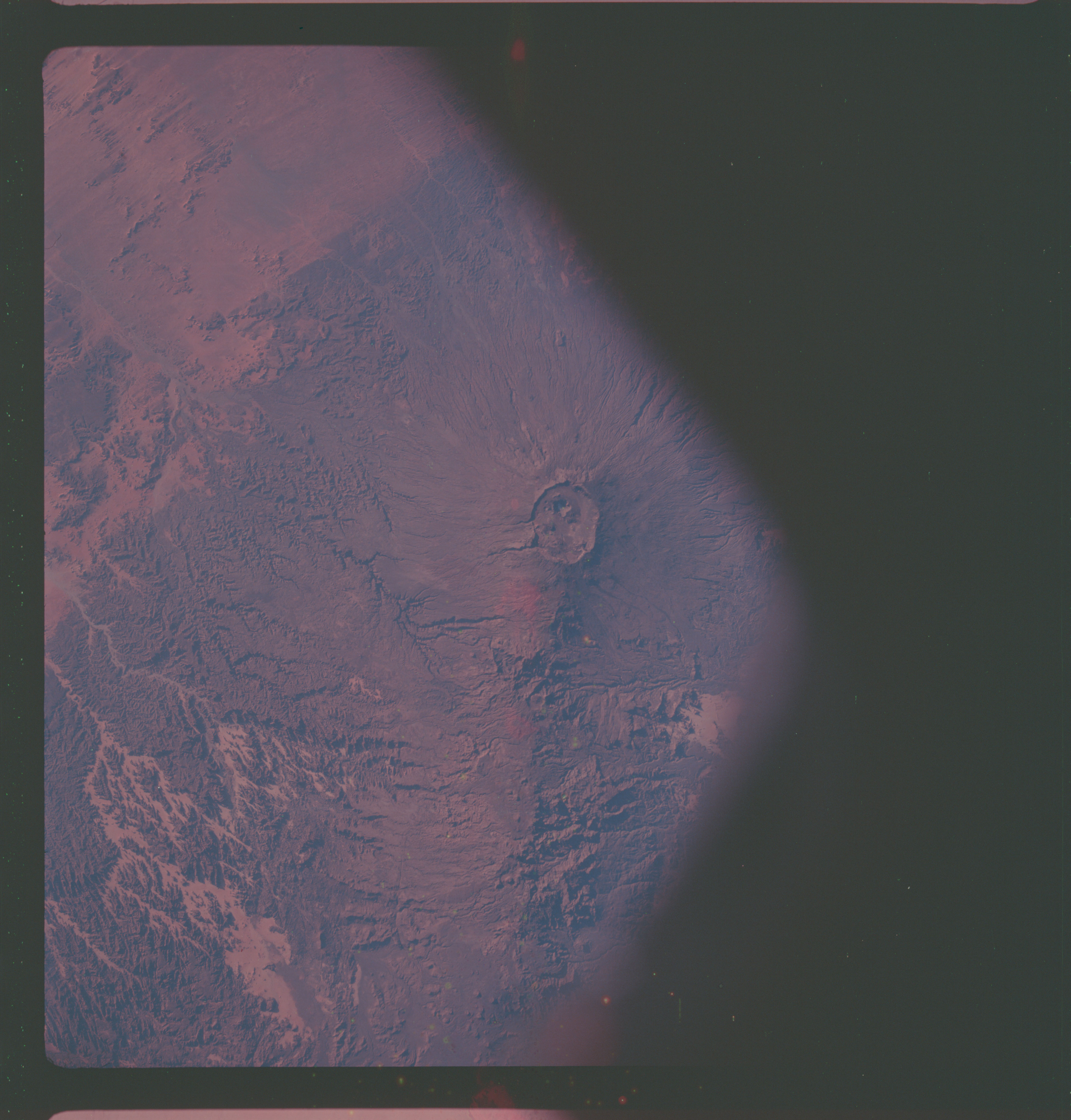
Emi Koussi seen from Apollo 7 in October 1968

== See also ==
- Geography of Chad
- List of volcanoes in Chad
- List of Ultras of Africa
