= Billy Mitchell (volcano) =

Volcano in Papua New Guinea

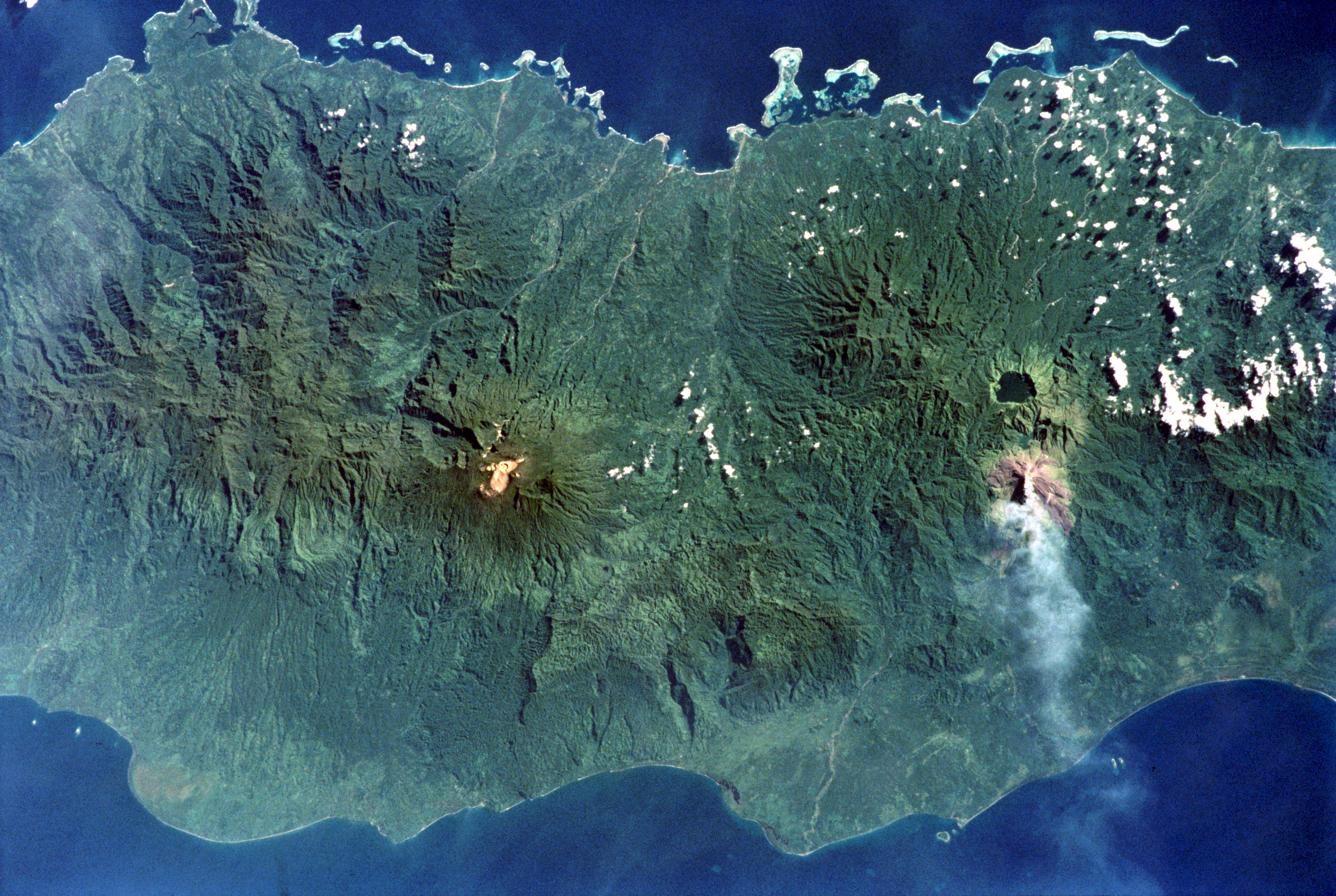
- The dark-colored caldera lake of Billy Mitchell is at right, above an ash plume originating from Bagana.

Highest point
- Elevation: 1,544 m (5,066 ft)
- Coordinates: 6°06′S 155°13′E

Geography
- Location within Papua New Guinea
- Location: Bougainville, Papua New Guinea
- Parent range: Emperor Range

Geology
- Mountain type: Pyroclastic shield
- Rock type(s): Andesite, Dacite
- Volcanic zone: Solomon Islands
- Last eruption: 1580 ± 20 years

Billy Mitchell is a dormant pyroclastic shield volcano in central Bougainville, just north-east of the Bagana Volcano in Papua New Guinea. It is a small pyroclastic shield truncated by a 2 km wide caldera filled by a crater lake. It is named after Billy Mitchell, a 20th-century United States Army general who is sometimes regarded as the father of the United States Air Force.

== Background ==
The last two major eruptions were in 1580 AD ± 20 years and about 1030 AD. They were among the largest Holocene eruptions in Papua New Guinea. Both were explosive eruptions with a Volcanic Explosivity Index of at least 5. The 1580 AD ± 20 years eruption produced pyroclastic flows and probably formed its caldera. The second of these eruptions likely had an effect on worldwide temperature, lowering it by 0.2-0.3 degrees celsius for a year or two after the event. The ignimbrite deposit from that eruption, which had a VEI of 6, extends 22 kilometres (14 mi) from the caldera to the coast, and its volume is around 10 cubic kilometres (2.4 mi^{3}).

The volcano is considered dormant as its last eruption was over 350 years ago.

Ice core data from the Law Dome ice core in Antarctica shows abundant volcanic glass from an extremely volumous erutption in the mid 1550's. There is some evidence that the Billy Mitchell volcano might be implicated in this eruption. However, there is a large discrepancy in calendrical age equivalent. The glass shards, while similar in composition to Billy Mitchell, have a wide range of Silica content (between 60-67%). More research is needed on the petrology of Billy Mitchell lava content to implicate this volcano to the mid 1550's eruption.

== Caldera lake ==
Billy Mitchell caldera lake is about 1,013 m above sea level, has a total surface area of 3 km^{2} (1.2 sq mi), and the maximum depth approximately 88.3 m. The only fish species in the lake is the eel Anguilla megastoma. Billy Mitchell lake drains into the Tekan River.

== Name ==
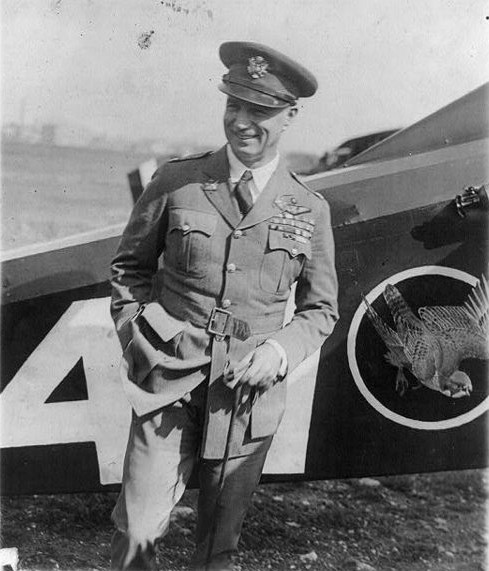
General William "Billy" Mitchell

The volcano was named after Billy Mitchell, a United States Army General who is also considered the father of the United States Air Force. By 1944, this crater lake became known as "Billy Mitchell Crater Lake" on Allied maps. Also known as simply "Mitchell Lake" or "B-25 Lake". It is unclear if this name was due to an aircraft crashed into or near this lake or if it was simply named for U.S. Army Air Force (USAAF) General William "Billy" Mitchell.

== See also ==
- List of volcanoes in Papua New Guinea
- Mount Billy Mitchell (Chugach Mountains)
- Timeline of volcanism on Earth
