= Mount Shiribetsu =

Volcano on the Japanese island of Hokkaido

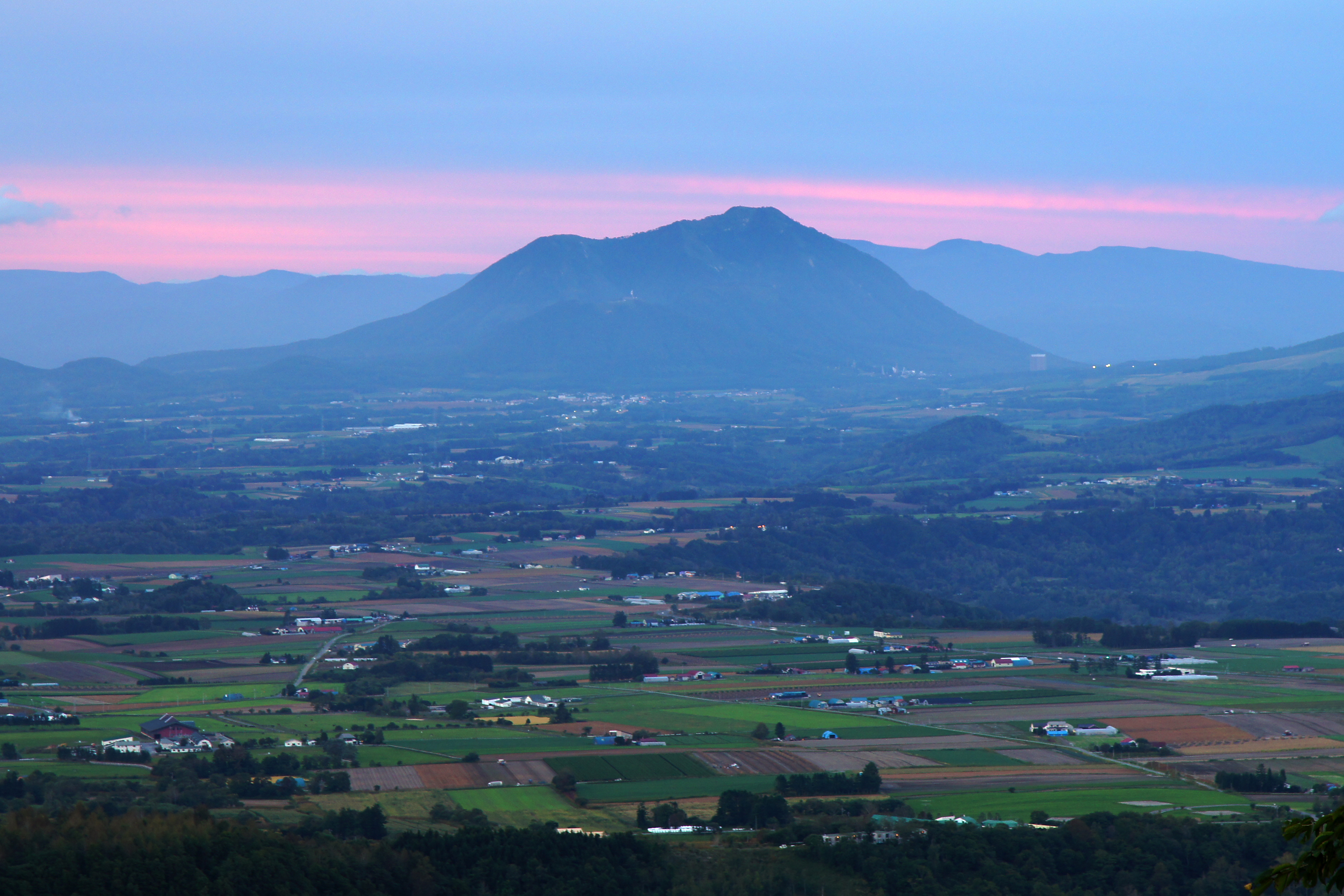
- WSW side

Highest point
- Elevation: 1,107 m (3,632 ft)
- Coordinates: 42°46′21″N 140°54′38″E

Geography
- Location within Hokkaido Location within Japan
- Location: Hokkaido, Japan

Geology
- Mountain type(s): Lava dome, Ignimbrite shield

Mount Shiribetsu (Japanese: 尻別岳) is an ignimbrite shield volcano on the Japanese island of Hokkaido. The volcano last erupted hundreds of thousands of years before present.

== See also ==
- List of mountains in Japan
- List of volcanoes in Japan
