= Stratovolcano =

Type of conical volcano composed of layers of lava and tephra

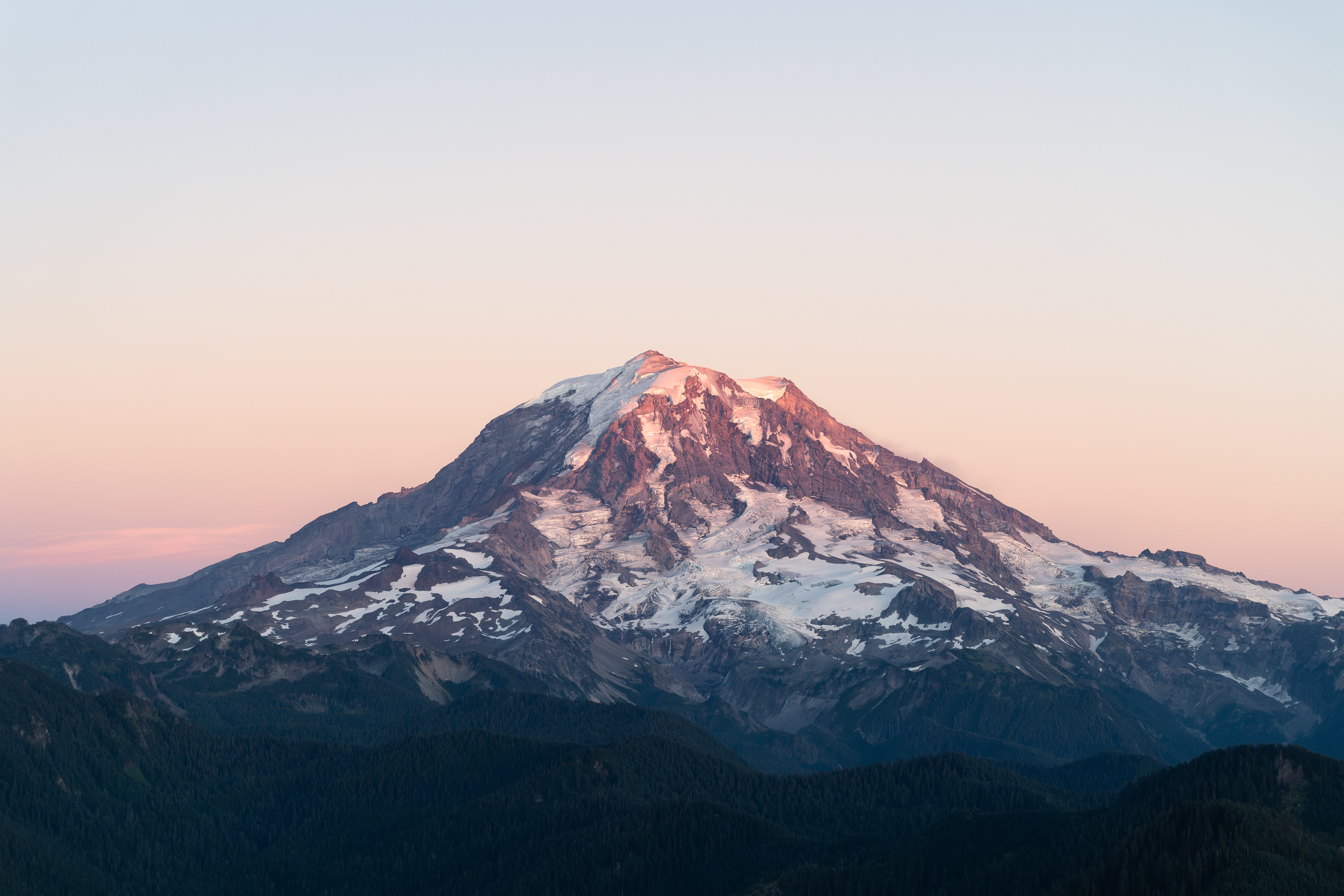
Mount Rainier, a 4,390-metre-tall (14,410 ft) stratovolcano, the highest mountain in the US state of Washington

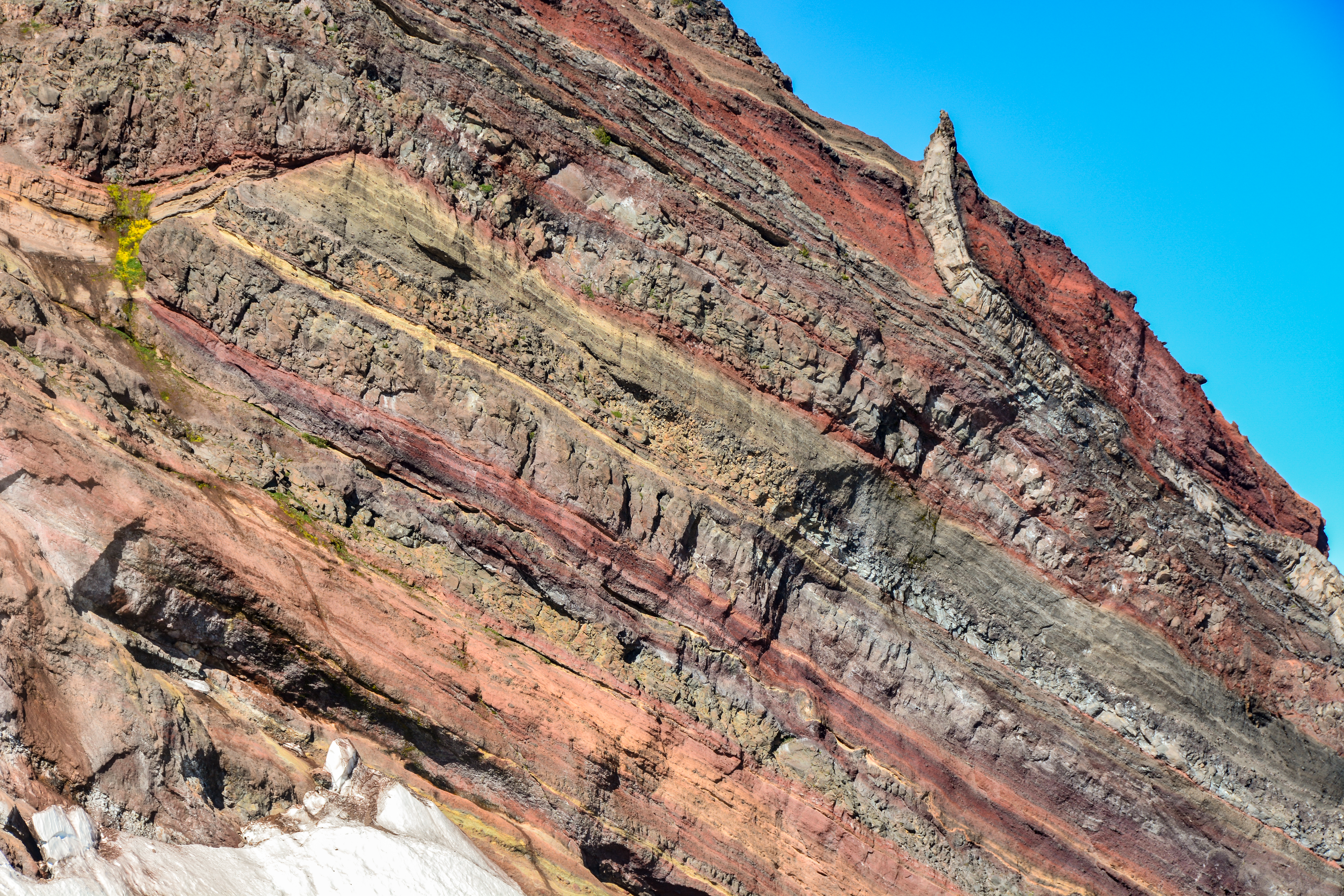
Exposed internal structure of alternating layers of lava and pyroclastic rock in the eroded Broken Top stratovolcano in Oregon

A stratovolcano, also known as a composite volcano, is a typically conical volcano built up by many alternating layers (strata) of hardened lava and tephra. Unlike shield volcanoes, stratovolcanoes are characterized by a steep profile with a summit crater and explosive eruptions. Some have collapsed summit craters called calderas. The lava flowing from stratovolcanoes typically cools and solidifies before spreading far, due to high viscosity. The magma forming this lava is often felsic, having high to intermediate levels of silica (as in rhyolite, dacite, or andesite), with lesser amounts of less viscous mafic magma. Extensive felsic lava flows are uncommon, but can travel as far as 8 kilometres (5 miles).

The term composite volcano is used because strata are usually mixed and uneven instead of neat layers. They are among the most common types of volcanoes; more than 700 stratovolcanoes have erupted lava during the Holocene Epoch (the last 11,700 years), and many older, now extinct, stratovolcanoes erupted lava as far back as Archean times. Stratovolcanoes are typically found in subduction zones but they also occur in other geological settings. Two examples of stratovolcanoes famous for catastrophic eruptions are Krakatoa in Indonesia (which erupted in 1883 claiming 36,000 lives) and Mount Vesuvius in Italy (which erupted in 79 A.D killing an estimated 2,000 people). In modern times, Mount St. Helens (1980) in Washington State, US, and Mount Pinatubo (1991) in the Philippines have erupted catastrophically, but with fewer deaths.

The existence of stratovolcanoes on other bodies of the Solar System has not been conclusively demonstrated. Zephyria Tholus is one of two mountains in the Aeolis region of Mars that have been proposed as possible stratovolcanoes.

== Distribution ==
Cross-section of subduction zone and associated stratovolcanoes

Stratovolcanoes are common at subduction zones, forming chains and clusters along plate tectonic boundaries where an oceanic crust plate is drawn under a continental crust plate (continental arc volcanism, e.g. Cascade Range, Andes, Campania) or another oceanic crust plate (island arc volcanism, e.g. Japan, Philippines, Aleutian Islands).

Stratovolcanoes also occur in some other geological settings, for example as a result of intraplate volcanism on oceanic islands far from plate boundaries. Examples are Teide in the Canary Islands, and Pico do Fogo in Cape Verde. Stratovolcanoes have formed in continental rifts. Examples in the East African Rift are Ol Doinyo Lengai in Tanzania, and Longonot in Kenya.

== Formation ==
Subduction zone volcanoes form when hydrous minerals are pulled down into the mantle on the slab. These hydrous minerals, such as chlorite and serpentine, release their water into the mantle which decreases its melting point by 60 to 100 °C (110 to 180 °F). The release of water from hydrated minerals is termed "dewatering", and occurs at specific pressures and temperatures for each mineral, as the plate descends to greater depths. This allows the mantle to partially melt and generate magma. This is called flux melting. The magma then rises through the crust, incorporating silica-rich crustal rock, leading to a final intermediate composition. When the magma nears the top surface, it pools in a magma chamber within the crust below the stratovolcano.

The processes that trigger the final eruption remain a question for further research. Possible mechanisms include:

- Magma differentiation, in which the lightest, most silica-rich magma and volatiles such as water, halogens, and sulfur dioxide accumulate in the uppermost part of the magma chamber. This can dramatically increase pressures.
- Fractional crystallization of the magma. When anhydrous minerals such as feldspar crystallize out of the magma, this concentrates volatiles in the remaining liquid, which can lead to a second boiling that causes a gas phase (carbon dioxide or water) to separate from the liquid magma and raise magma chamber pressures.
- Injection of fresh magma into the magma chamber, which mixes and heats the cooler magma already present. This could force volatiles out of solution and lower the density of the cooler magma, both of which increase pressure. There is considerable evidence for magma mixing just before many eruptions, including magnesium-rich olivine crystals in freshly erupted silicic lava that show no reaction rim. This is possible only if the lava erupted immediately after mixing since olivine rapidly reacts with silicic magma to form a rim of pyroxene.
- Progressive melting of the surrounding country rock.

These internal triggers may be modified by external triggers such as sector collapse, earthquakes, or interactions with groundwater. Some of these triggers operate only under limited conditions. For example, sector collapse (where part of the flank of a volcano collapses in a massive landslide) can only trigger the eruption of a very shallow magma chamber. Magma differentiation and thermal expansion also are ineffective as triggers for eruptions from deep magma chambers.

== Hazards ==
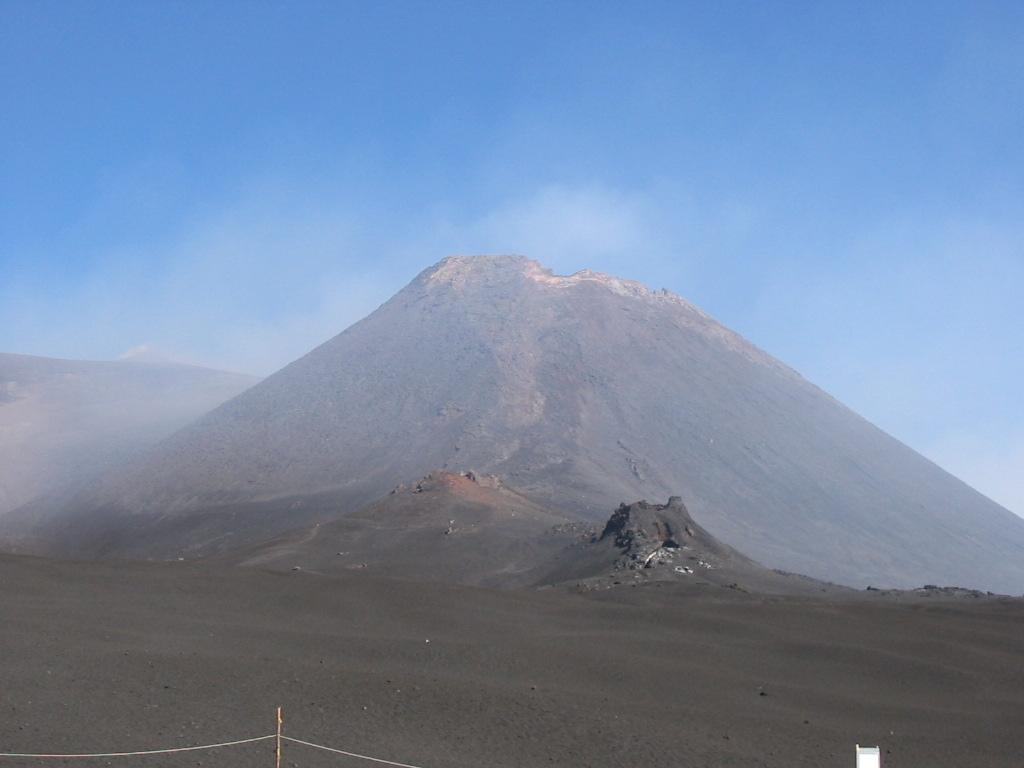
Mount Etna on the island of Sicily, in southern Italy

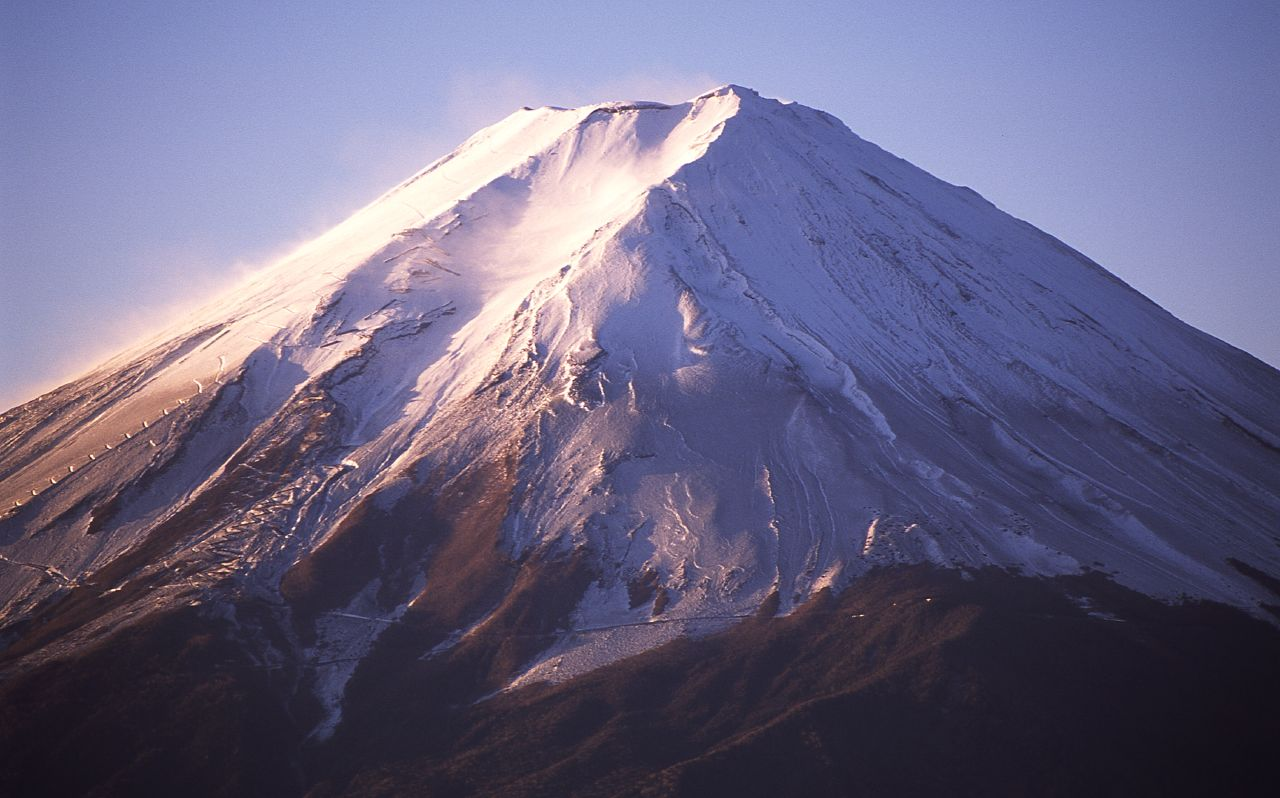
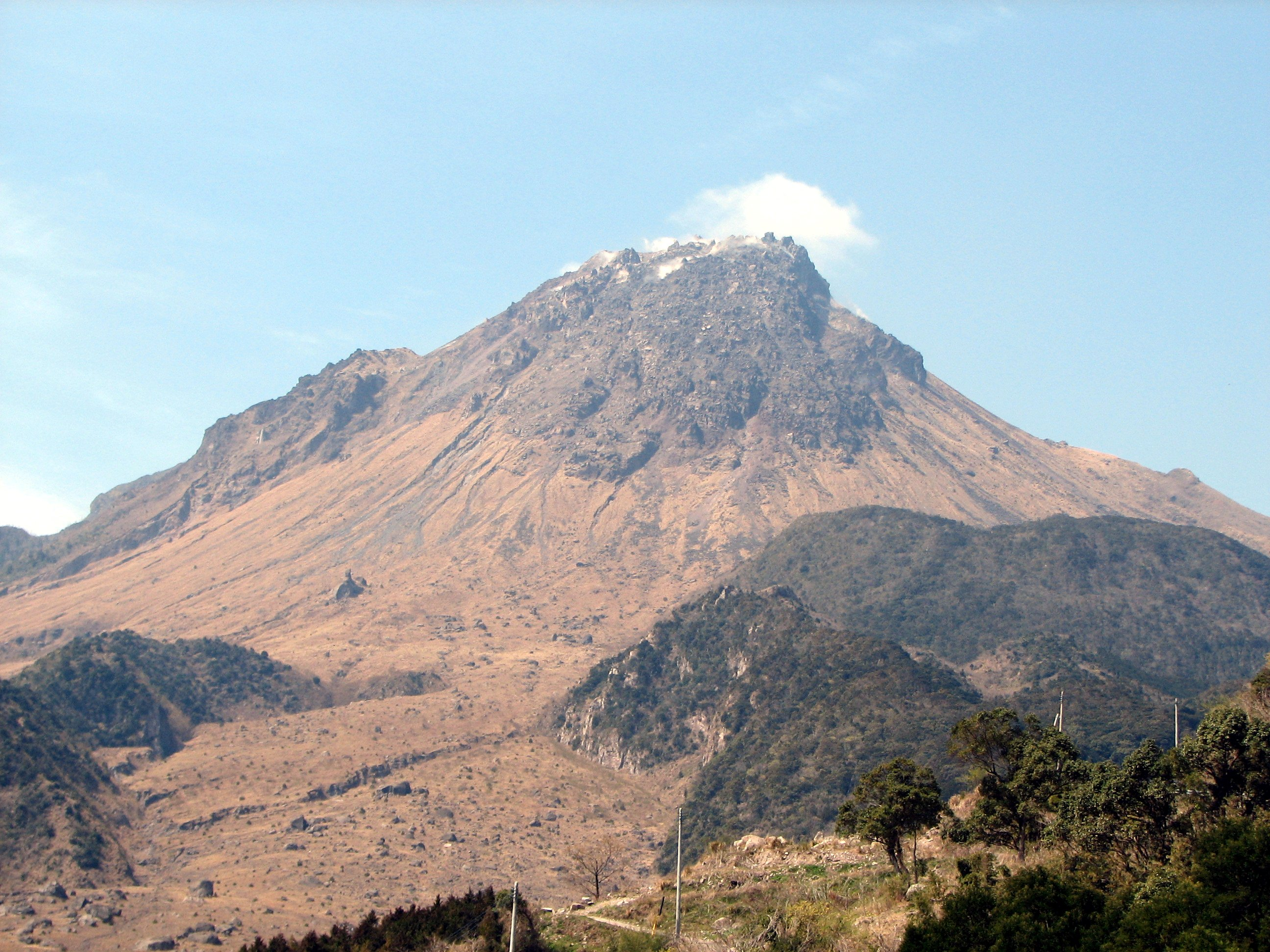
Mount Fuji on Honshu (top) and Mount Unzen on Kyushu (bottom), two of Japan's stratovolcanoes

In recorded history, explosive eruptions at subduction zone (convergent-boundary) volcanoes have posed the greatest hazard to civilizations. Subduction-zone stratovolcanoes, such as Mount St. Helens, Mount Etna and Mount Pinatubo, typically erupt with explosive force because the magma is too viscous to allow easy escape of volcanic gases. As a consequence, the tremendous internal pressures of the trapped volcanic gases remain and intermingle in the pasty magma. Following the breaching of the vent and the opening of the crater, the magma degasses explosively. The magma and gases blast out with high speed and full force.

Since 1600 CE, nearly 300,000 people have been killed by volcanic eruptions. Most deaths were caused by pyroclastic flows and lahars, deadly hazards that often accompany explosive eruptions of subduction-zone stratovolcanoes. Pyroclastic flows are swift, avalanche-like, ground-sweeping, incandescent mixtures of hot volcanic debris, fine ash, fragmented lava, and superheated gases that can travel at speeds over 150 km/h (90 mph). Around 30,000 people were killed by pyroclastic flows during the 1902 eruption of Mount Pelée on the island of Martinique in the Caribbean. During March and April 1982, El Chichón in the State of Chiapas in southeastern Mexico, erupted 3 times, causing the worst volcanic disaster in Mexico's history and killing more than 2,000 people in pyroclastic flows.

Two Decade Volcanoes that erupted in 1991 provide examples of stratovolcano hazards. On 15 June, Mount Pinatubo erupted and caused an ash cloud to shoot 40 km (25 mi) into the air. It produced large pyroclastic surges and lahar floods that caused a lot of damage to the surrounding area. Mount Pinatubo, located in Central Luzon 90 km (56 mi) west-northwest of Manila, had been dormant for six centuries before an eruption in 1991. This eruption was the second largest in the 20th century. It produced a large cloud of volcanic ash that affected global temperatures, lowering them as much as 0.5 °C. The cloud consisted of 22 million tons of sulfur dioxide which combined with water droplets to create sulfuric acid. In 1991 Japan's Mount Unzen also erupted, after 200 years of inactivity. It's located on the island of Kyushu about 40 km (25 mi) east of Nagasaki. Beginning in June, a newly formed lava dome repeatedly collapsed. This generated a pyroclastic flow that flowed down the mountain's slopes at speeds as high as 200 km/h (120 mph). The 1991 eruption of Mount Unzen caused 43 deaths. In 1792, Mount Unzen was responsible for one of the worst volcanic disasters in Japan's history, killing more than 15,000 people.

The eruption of Mount Vesuvius in 79 AD is the most famous example of a hazardous stratovolcano eruption. Pyroclastic surges completely smothered the nearby ancient cities of Pompeii and Herculaneum with thick deposits of ash and pumice ranging from 6–7 meters deep. Pompeii had 10,000–20,000 inhabitants at the time of eruption. Mount Vesuvius is recognized as one of the most dangerous of the world's volcanoes, due to its capacity for powerful explosive eruptions coupled with the high population density of the surrounding Metropolitan Naples area (totaling about 3.6 million inhabitants).

=== Ash ===
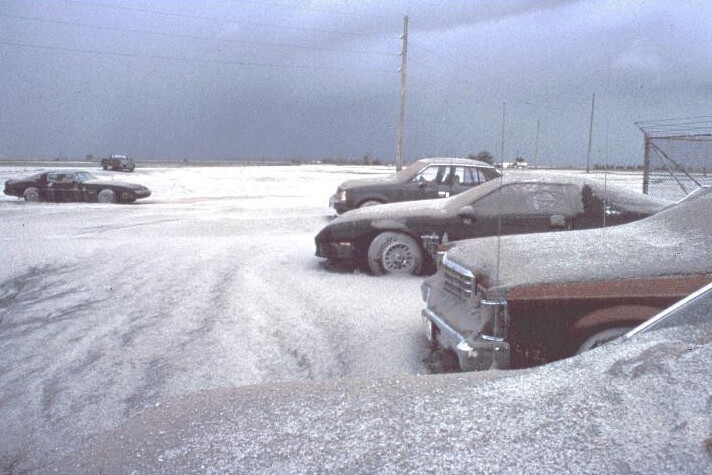
Snow-like blanket of Mount Pinatubo's ashfall deposits in a parking lot on Clark Air Base (15 June 1991)

In addition to potentially affecting the climate, volcanic ash clouds from explosive eruptions pose a serious hazard to aviation. Volcanic ash clouds consist of silt- or sand-sized pieces of rock, mineral, volcanic glass. Volcanic ash grains are jagged, abrasive, and insoluble in water. For example, during the 1982 eruption of Galunggung in Java, British Airways Flight 9 flew into the ash cloud, causing it to sustain temporary engine failure and structural damage. Although no crashes have happened due to ash, more than 60, mostly commercial aircraft, have been damaged. Some of these incidents resulted in emergency landings. Ashfalls are a threat to health when inhaled and are also a threat to property. A square yard (0.84 m²) of a 4-inch (10 cm) thick volcanic ash layer can weigh 120–200 pounds (54–91 kg) and can get twice as heavy when wet. Wet ash also poses a risk to electronics due to its conductive nature. Dense clouds of hot volcanic ash can be expelled due to the collapse of an eruptive column, or laterally due to the partial collapse of a volcanic edifice or lava dome during explosive eruptions. These clouds are known as pyroclastic surges and in addition to volcanic ash, they contain hot lava, pumice, rock, and volcanic gas. Pyroclastic surges flow at speeds over 50 mph (80 km/h) and are at temperatures between 200 °C – 700 °C. These surges can cause major damage to property and people in their path.

=== Lava ===
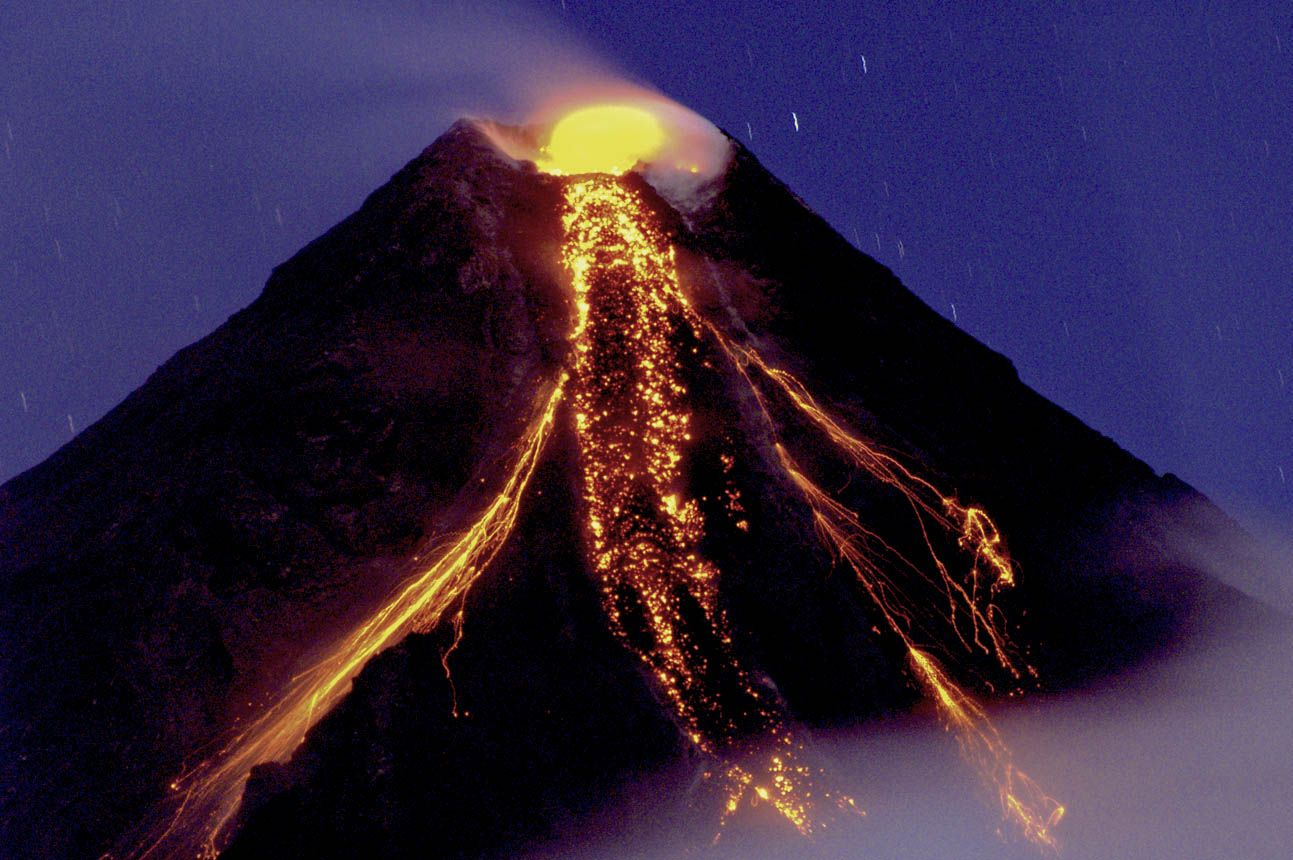
Mayon Volcano in Philippines extruding lava flows during its eruption on 29 December 2009

Lava flows from stratovolcanoes are generally not a significant threat to humans or animals because the highly viscous lava moves slowly enough for everyone to evacuate. Most deaths attributed to lava are due to related causes such as explosions and asphyxiation from toxic gas. Lava flows can bury homes and farms in thick volcanic rock which greatly reduces property value. However, not all stratovolcanoes erupt viscous and sticky lava. Nyiragongo, near Lake Kivu in central Africa, is very dangerous because its magma has an unusually low silica content, making it much less viscous than other stratovolcanoes. Low viscosity lava can generate massive lava fountains, while lava of thicker viscosity can solidify within the vent, creating a volcanic plug. Volcanic plugs can trap volcanic gas and create pressure in the magma chamber, resulting in violent eruptions. Lava is typically between 700 and 1,200 °C (1,300–2,200 °F).

=== Volcanic bombs ===
Volcanic bombs are masses of unconsolidated rock and lava that are ejected during an eruption. Volcanic bombs are classified as larger than 64 mm (2.5 in). Anything from 2 to 64 mm is classified as lapilli. When erupted, volcanic bombs are still molten and partially cool and solidify on their descent. They can form ribbon or oval shapes that can also flatten on impact with the ground. Volcanic bombs are associated with Strombolian and Vulcanian eruptions and basaltic lava. Ejection velocities ranging from 200 to 400 m/s have been recorded causing volcanic bombs to be destructive.

=== Lahar ===
Lahars (from a Javanese term for volcanic mudflows) are a mixture of volcanic debris and water. Lahars can result from heavy rainfall during or before the eruption or interaction with ice and snow. Meltwater mixes with volcanic debris causing a fast moving mudflow. Lahars are typically about 60% sediment and 40% water. Depending on the abundance of volcanic debris the lahar can be fluid or thick like concrete. Lahars have the strength and speed to flatten structures and cause great bodily harm, gaining speeds up to dozens of kilometers per hour. In the 1985 eruption of Nevado del Ruiz in Colombia, pyroclastic surges melted snow and ice atop the 5,321 m (17,457 ft) high Andean volcano. The ensuing lahar killed 25,000 people and flooded the city of Armero and nearby settlements.

=== Volcanic gas ===
As a volcano forms, several different gases mix with magma in the volcanic chamber. During an eruption the gases are then released into the atmosphere which can lead to toxic human exposure. The most abundant of these gases is H_{2}O (water) followed by CO_{2} (carbon dioxide), SO_{2} (sulfur dioxide), H_{2}S (hydrogen sulfide), HCl (Hydrogen Chloride) and HF (hydrogen fluoride). If at concentrations of more than 3% in the air, when breathed in CO_{2} can cause dizziness and difficulty breathing. At more than 15% concentration CO_{2} causes death. CO_{2} can settle into depressions in the land, leading to deadly, odorless pockets of gas. SO_{2} classified as a respiratory, skin, and eye irritant. It is known for its pungent egg smell and role in ozone depletion and has the potential to cause acid rain downwind of an eruption. H_{2}S has an even stronger odor than SO_{2} as well as being even more toxic. Exposure for less than an hour at concentrations of over 500 ppm causes death. HF and similar species can coat ash particles and once deposited can poison soil and water. Gases are also emitted during volcanic degassing, which is a passive release of gas during periods of dormancy.

== Eruptions that affected global climate ==
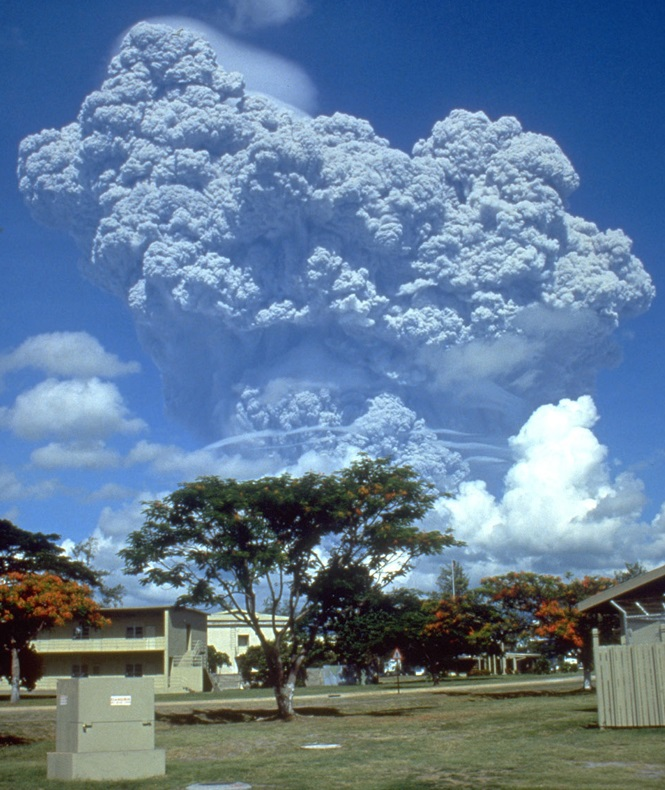
Mount Pinatubo's 1991 eruption ash cloud seen from Clark Airbase. 12 June 1991

While eruptions like Mount Unzen have caused deaths and local damage, the impact of the June 1991 eruption of Mount Pinatubo was seen globally. The eruptive columns reached heights of 40 km (25 mi) and dumped 17 megatons of SO_{2} into the lower stratosphere. The aerosols that formed from the sulfur dioxide (SO_{2}), carbon dioxide (CO_{2}), and other volcanic gases dispersed around the world. The SO_{2} in this cloud combined with water (both of volcanic and atmospheric origin) and formed sulfuric acid, blocking a portion of the sunlight from reaching the troposphere. This caused the global temperature to decrease by about 0.4 °C (0.72 °F) from 1992 to 1993. These aerosols caused the ozone layer to reach the lowest concentrations recorded at that time. An eruption the size of Mount Pinatubo affected the weather for a few years; with warmer winters and cooler summers observed.

A similar phenomenon occurred in the April 1815, the eruption of Mount Tambora on Sumbawa island in Indonesia. This eruption is recognized as the most powerful eruption in recorded history. Its eruption cloud lowered global temperatures as much as 0.4 to 0.7 °C (0.72 to 1.26 °F). In the year following the eruption, most of the Northern Hemisphere experienced cooler temperatures during the summer. In the northern hemisphere, 1816 was known as the "Year Without a Summer". The eruption caused crop failures, food shortages, and floods that killed over 100,000 people across Europe, Asia, and North America.

== See also ==
- Cinder cone – Steep hill of pyroclastic fragments around a volcanic vent
- Mountain formation – Geological processes that underlie the formation of mountains
- Orogeny – Formation of mountain ranges
- Pyroclastic shield – Shield volcano formed mostly of pyroclastic and highly explosive eruptions
