= Sacabaya =

Volcano in Bolivia

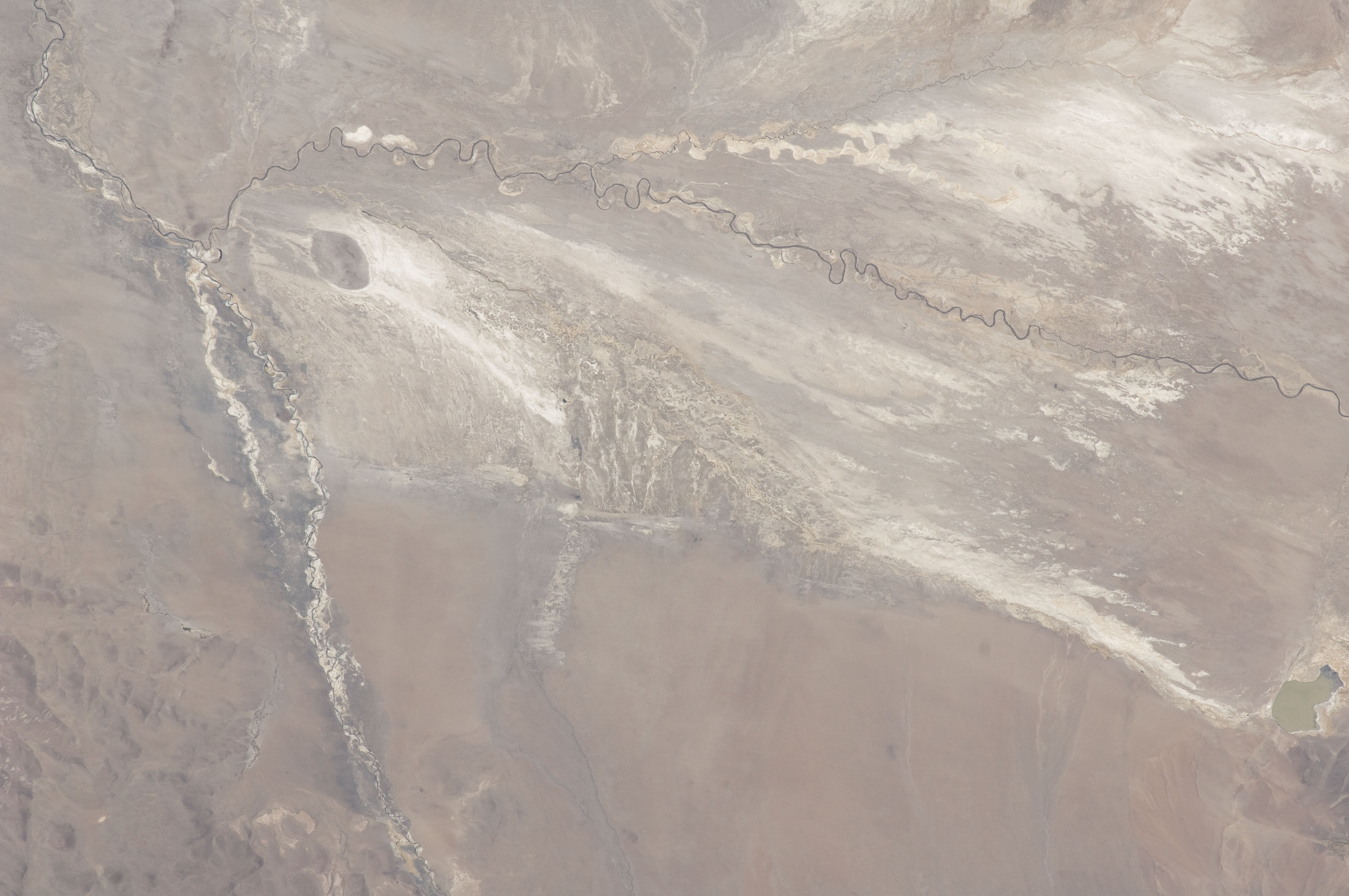
- View Of The Volcano From Space

Highest point
- Elevation: 4,215 m (13,829 ft)
- Coordinates: 18°37′0″S 68°45′0″W

Geography
- Location: Bolivia
- Parent range: Andes

Geology
- Mountain type: Pyroclastic shield
- Last eruption: Pleistocene

Sacabaya (also known as Tambo Quemado) is a pyroclastic shield in Bolivia. It is located on the Altiplano near to the Rio Lauca. The volcano is composed of ignimbrite, which has formed a shield. The shield is capped by an area of vents which has many overlapping craters, and is elongated in shape. At the southern end lies the youngest of the craters which has a lava dome within it.

Sacabaya has a diameter of 8 kilometres (5.0 mi) and rises 360 metres (1,180 ft) to the summit; the edifice is covered by material produced during explosive activity. The summit contains a north–south row of several pit craters, each with a diameter of about 1.5 kilometres (0.93 mi), and one of which contains a lava dome. Material from the volcano has been transported away by wind. The volcano may be of Holocene age and is presently fumarolically active (GVP).

== See also ==
- List of volcanoes in Bolivia

== Sources ==
- "Tambo Quemado". Global Volcanism Program. Smithsonian Institution.
