= Pyroclastic fall =

Deposit of material ejected from a volcanic eruption

A pyroclastic fall deposit is a uniform deposit of material which has been ejected from a volcanic eruption or plume such as an ash fall or tuff. Pyroclastic fallout deposits are a result of:

1. Ballistic transport of ejecta such as volcanic blocks, volcanic bombs and lapilli from volcanic explosions
2. Deposition of material from convective clouds associated with pyroclastic flows such as coignimbrite falls
3. Ejecta carried in gas streaming from a vent. The material under the action of gravity will settle out from an eruption plume or eruption column
4. Ejecta settling from an eruptive plume or eruption column that is displaced laterally by wind currents and is dispersed over great distances

== Structures ==
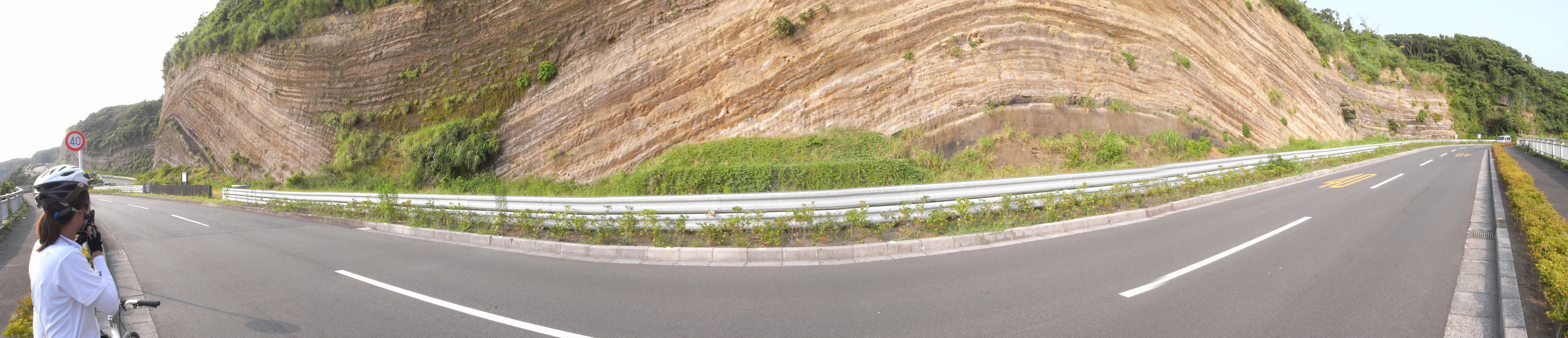
Pyroclastic fall layers of volcanic ash from Mount Mihara on Izu Oshima, Japan. The ash fell on an uneven ground surface, resulting in its curved appearance; ash layers have not been folded after deposition.

The deposits of pyroclastic falls follow a well sorted and well bedded trend. They exhibit mantle bedding—the deposits directly overlie pre-existing topography and maintain a uniform thickness over relatively short distances. Sorting by size is more pronounced than pyroclastic surge or pyroclastic flows. Early settling of crystals and lithic fragments near an eruptive vent and of glassy fragments further away is a common trend witnessed during many eruptions. The St Vincent eruption in 1902 ejected a large eruption column which when settled near the vent contained 73% crystals, and ash deposited in Jamaica 1,600 km away consisted entirely of glass dust.

== Dispersal ==
The distribution of pyroclastic ash depends largely on the direction of wind at intermediate and high altitudes between approximately 4.5 – 13 km. The general trend of pyroclastic dispersal is shown using isopachs (which are analogous to topographic map contours though they illustrate lines of equal thickness rather than elevation) and show the dispersal as elongated with wind direction.

The Krakatoa (Indonesia) eruption of 1883 produced an eruption column which rose to more than 50 km. An ash flow from this explosion was recognised 2,500 km west of the volcano. The total area of recognisable pyroclastic fall was greater than 800,000 km^{2}. The pyroclastic ash encircled the globe in 13.5 days and at altitudes of between 30 and 50 km the average velocity was 12 km/h. The ash remained in the upper atmosphere and produced brilliant sunsets for many years, lowered the global temperature by 0.5 °C for at least five years.

The 1912 eruption in the Valley of Ten Thousand Smokes (Alaska) covered an area greater than 100,000 km^{2} to a depth of six mm.

== Composition variations ==
Pyroclastic falls exhibit lateral and commonly vertical variations in the nature and size of fragments. This is commonly known as an inversion of the magma chamber.

The 79 AD eruption of Mount Vesuvius produced the Pompeii Pumice which is an example of lateral and vertical variations. The deposit is well sorted with density and size of pumice, and the content and size of the lithic fragments increasing upwards. The bottom layer of the pumice is white felsic rich pumice with a darker grey mafic pumice overlying it. These changes represent the increasing vigour of the eruption. The mafic upper part of the deposit reflects the increasing depth of the origin or compositionally zoned magma chamber (mafic lava is denser and settles to the bottom of the chamber as well as crystals which settle out, e.g., olivine). This unit represents an inversion of the magma chamber as progressively deeper materials from the chamber were tapped as the eruption progressed.

== See also ==
- Pyroclastic flow
- Pyroclastic rock
- Pyroclastic surge
- Pyroclastic shield volcano
