= Pyroclastic surge =

Mass of turbulent ash and gas that occurs in some volcanic eruptions

A pyroclastic surge is a fluidised mass of turbulent gas and rock fragments that is ejected during some volcanic eruptions. It is similar to a pyroclastic flow but has a lower density, having a much higher ratio of gas to rock, which makes it more turbulent and allows it to rise over ridges and hills rather than always travel downhill as pyroclastic flows do.

The speed of pyroclastic density currents has been measured directly via photography only in the case of Mount St. Helens, where they reached 320-470 km/h, or 90–130 m/s (200–290 mph). Estimates of other modern eruptions are around 360 km/h, or 100 m/s (225 mph). Pyroclastic flows may generate surges. For example, the city of Saint-Pierre in Martinique in 1902 was overcome by one. Pyroclastic surge include 3 types, which are base surge, ash-cloud surge, and ground surge.

== Base surge ==
Base surges were first recognized after the Taal Volcano eruption of 1965 in the Philippines, where a visiting volcanologist from USGS recognized the phenomenon as congruent to base surge in nuclear explosions. Very similar to the ground-hugging blasts associated with nuclear explosions, these surges are expanding rings of a turbulent mixture of fragments and gas that surge outward at the base of explosion columns. Base surges are more likely generated by the interaction of magma and water or phreatomagmatic eruptions. They develop from the interaction of magma (often basaltic) and water to form thin wedge-shaped deposits characteristic of maars.

== Ash-cloud surge ==
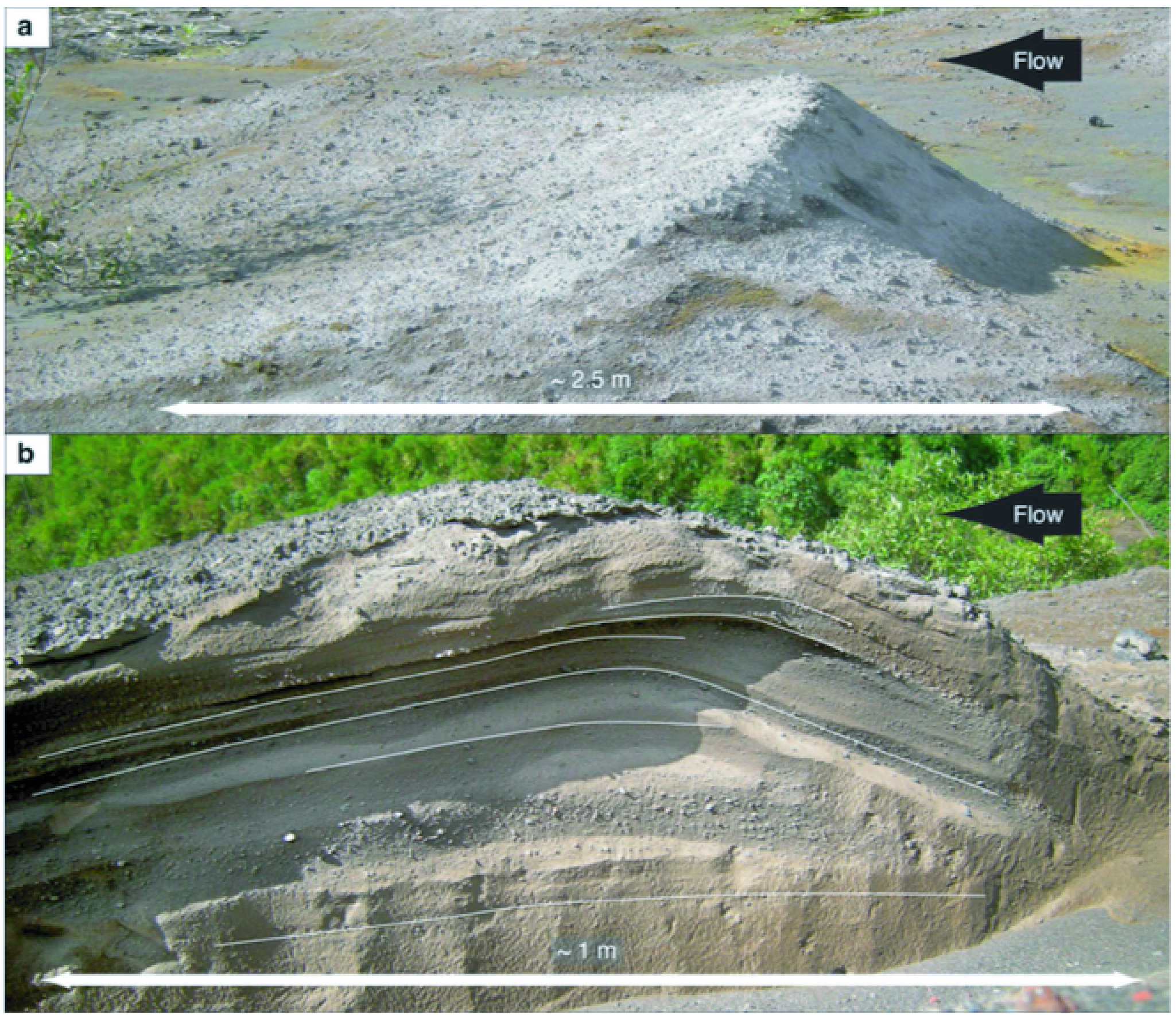
Dune bedform formed by the pyroclastic currents related to the 2006 eruption of Tungurahua (Ecuador). A. Outer shape of a lunate dune bedform and B. internal lamination. Preferential aggradation is visible on the upstream face (backset laminations).

These are the most devastating. They form thin deposits, but travel at great speed (10–100 m/s) carrying abundant debris such as trees, rocks, bricks, tiles, etc. They are so powerful that they often blast and erode material (like sandblasting). They are possibly produced when conditions in an eruption column are close to the boundary conditions separating convection from collapse. That is, switching rapidly from one condition to the other.

== Ground surge ==
These deposits are often found at the base of pyroclastic flows. They are thinly bedded, laminated and often cross-bedded. Typically they are about 1 m. thick and consist mostly of lithic and crystal fragments (fine ash elutriated away). They appear to form from the flow itself, but the mechanism is not clear. One possibility is that the head of the flow expands through entrainment of air (which is then heated). This then results in the flow front surging forward, which is then over-run by the rest of the flow.

== See also ==
- Pyroclastic fall
- Pyroclastic rock
