= Explosive eruption =

Type of volcanic eruption in which lava is violently expelled

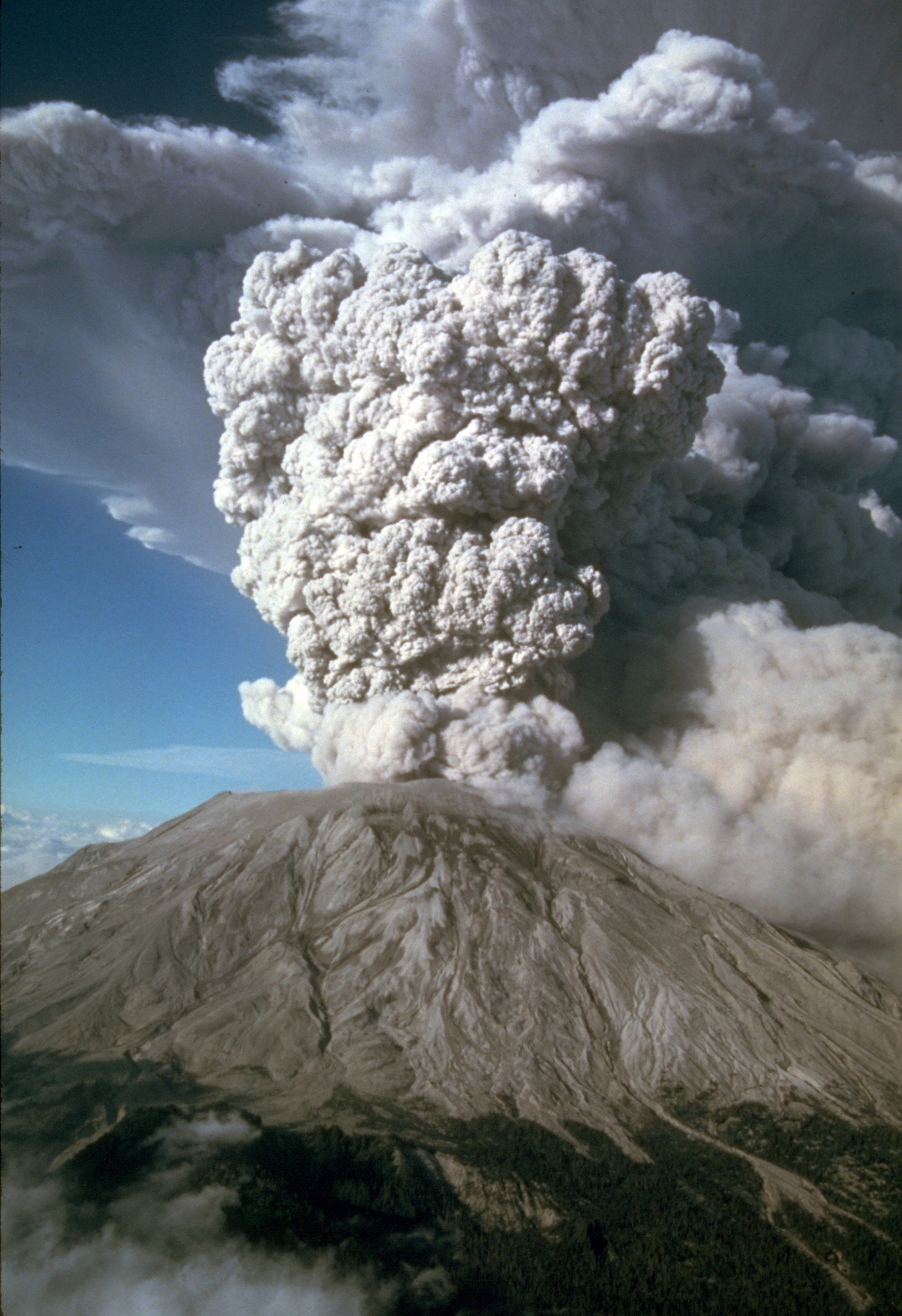
Mount St. Helens explosive eruption on July 22, 1980

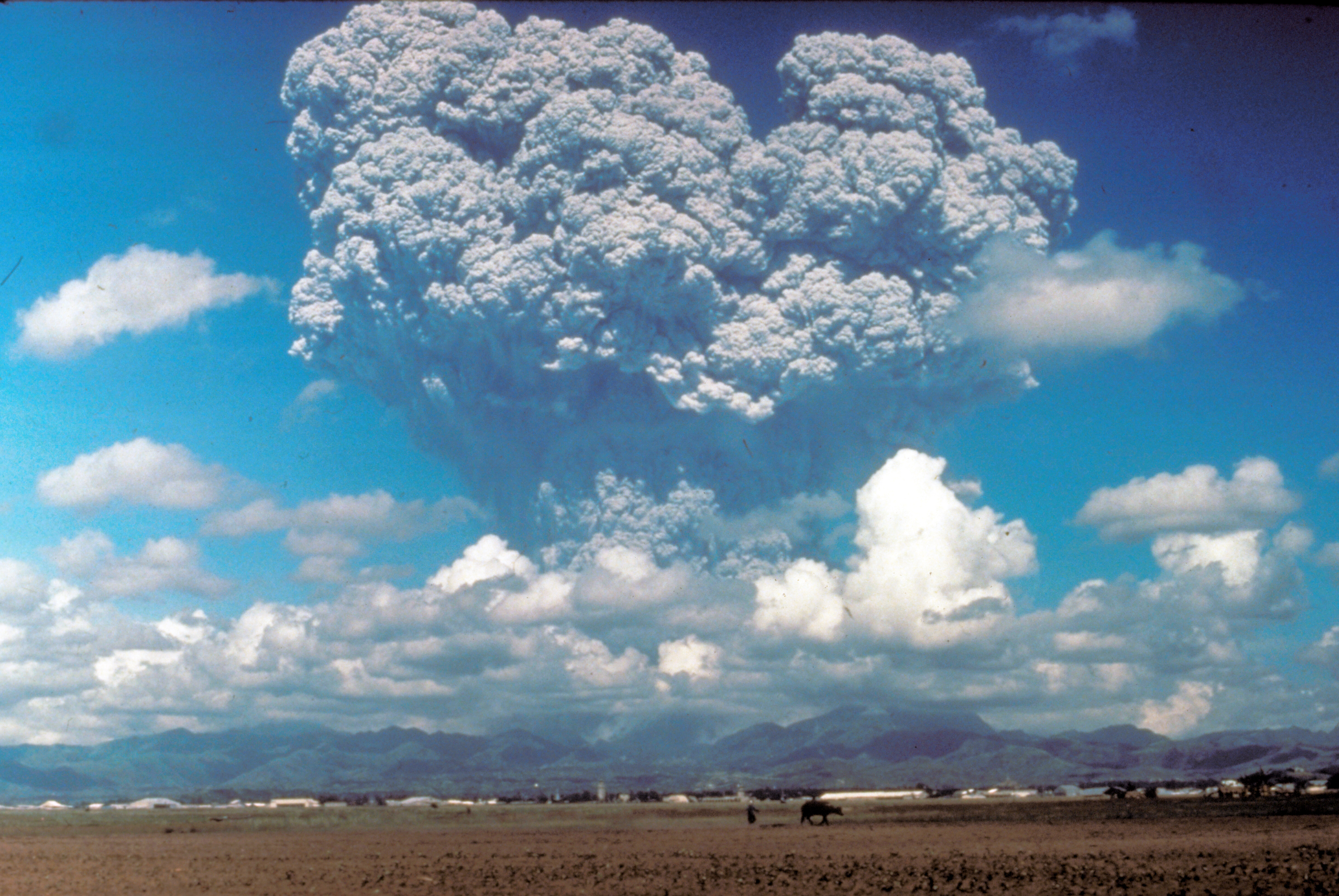
Eruption of Mount Pinatubo in the Philippines on June 12, 1991 (PST). Its ash would spread as far west as mainland South East Asia.

In volcanology, an explosive eruption is a volcanic eruption of the most violent type. A notable example is the 1980 eruption of Mount St. Helens. Such eruptions result when sufficient gas has dissolved under pressure within a viscous magma such that expelled lava violently froths into volcanic ash when pressure is suddenly lowered at the vent. Sometimes a lava plug will block the conduit to the summit, and when this occurs, eruptions are more violent. Explosive eruptions can expel as much as 1,000 kg (2,200 lb) per second of rocks, dust, gas and pyroclastic material, averaged over the duration of eruption, that travels at several hundred meters per second as high as 20 km (12 mi) into the atmosphere. This cloud may subsequently collapse, creating a fast-moving pyroclastic flow of hot volcanic matter.

== Physics ==
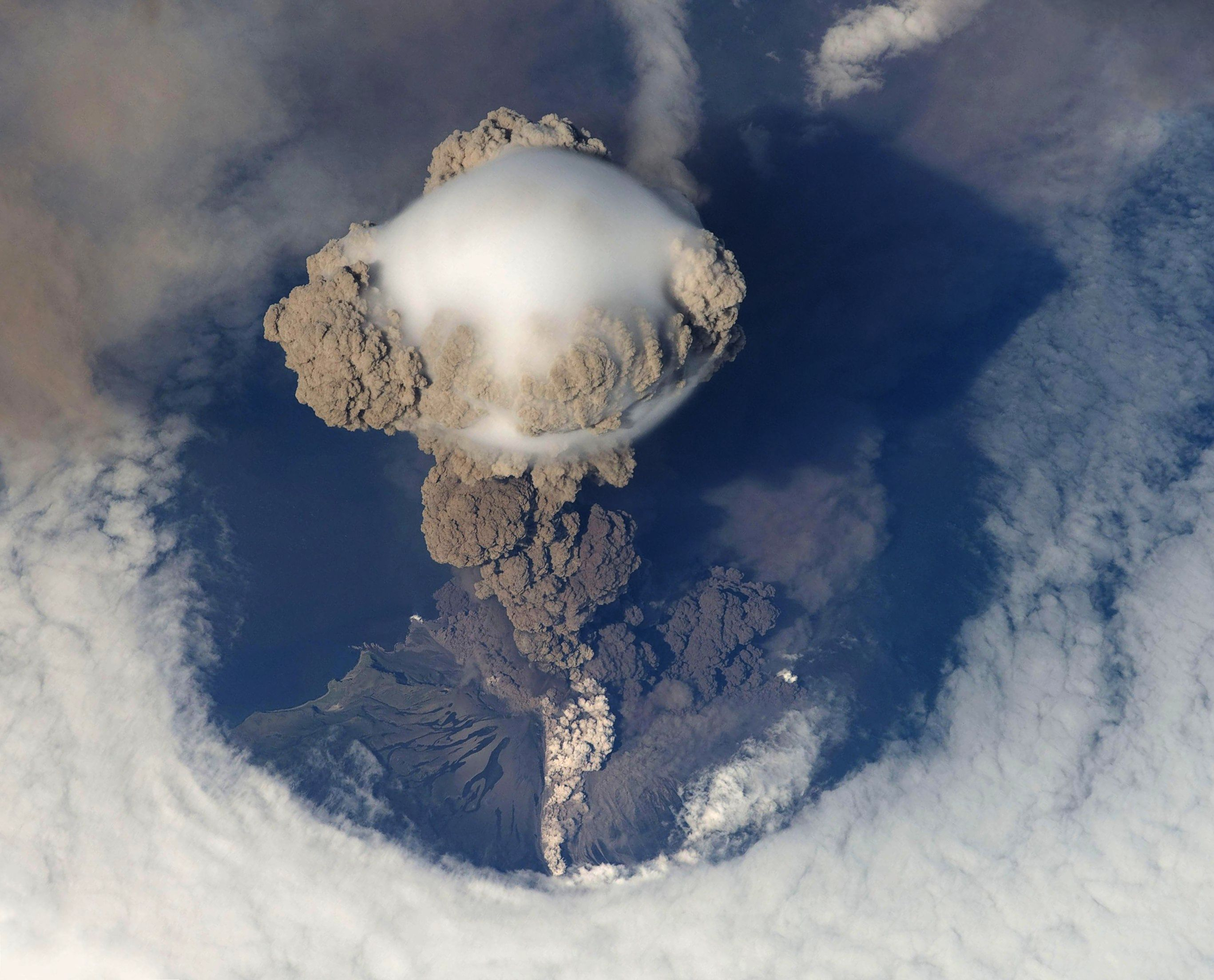
An early stage of the July 12, 2009, eruption of Sarychev volcano, seen from space

Viscous magmas cool beneath the surface before they erupt. As they do this, bubbles exsolve from the magma. Because the magma is viscous, the bubbles remain trapped in the magma. As the magma nears the surface, the bubbles and thus the magma increase in volume. The pressure of the magma builds until the blockage is blasted out in an explosive eruption through the weakest point in the cone, usually the crater. (However, in the case of the eruption of Mount St. Helens, the pressure was released on the side of the volcano, rather than the crater.). The release of pressure causes more gas to exsolve, doing so explosively. The gas may expand at hundreds of metres per second, expanding upward and outward. As the eruption progresses, a chain reaction causes the magma to be ejected at higher and higher speeds.

=== Volcanic ash formation ===
The violently expanding gas disperses and breaks up magma, forming an mixture of gas and magma called volcanic ash. The cooling of the gas in the ash as it expands chills the magma fragments, often forming tiny glass shards recognisable as portions of the walls of former liquid bubbles. In more fluid magmas the bubble walls may have time to reform into spherical liquid droplets. The final state of the emulsions depends strongly on the ratio of liquid to gas. Gas-poor magmas end up cooling into rocks with small cavities, becoming vesicular lava. Gas-rich magmas cool to form rocks with cavities that nearly touch, with an average density less than that of water, forming pumice. Meanwhile, other material can be accelerated with the gas, becoming volcanic bombs. These can travel with so much energy that large ones can create craters when they hit the ground.

=== Pyroclastic flows ===
Kanlaon erupted on December 9, 2024, releasing a plume of volcanic ash and pyroclastic flow that reached 4,000 metres (13,000 feet)

When an emulsion of volcanic gas and magma falls back to the ground, it can create a density current called a pyroclastic flow. The emulsion is somewhat fluidised by the gas, allowing it to spread. These can often climb over obstacles, and devastate human life. Earthly pyroclastic flows can travel at up to 80 km (50 mi) per hour and reach temperatures of 200 to 700 °C (392 to 1,292 °F). The high temperatures can burn flammable materials in the flow's path, including wood, vegetation, and buildings. Alternately, when an eruption has contact with snow, crater lakes, or wet soil in large amounts, water mixing into the flow can create lahars, which pose significant known risks worldwide.

=== Types ===
1. Vulcanian eruption
2. Peléan eruption
3. Plinian eruption
- Consequences:
  - Eruption column
  - Pyroclastic flow
  - Pyroclastic fall
  - Pyroclastic surge

=== Other mechanisms ===
An explosive eruption is usually triggered by exsolution of volatiles but there are other ways to create an explosive eruption.

==== Phreatic eruption ====
A phreatic eruption can occur when hot water under pressure is depressurised. Depressurisation reduces the boiling point of the water, so when depressurised the water suddenly boils. Or it may happen when groundwater is suddenly heated, flashing to steam suddenly. When the water turns into steam, it expands at supersonic speeds, up to 1,700 times its original volume. This can be enough to shatter solid rock, and hurl rock fragments hundreds of metres.

A phreatomagmatic eruption contains magmatic material, in contrast to a phreatic eruption which does not.

==== Clathrate hydrates ====
One mechanism for explosive cryovolcanism is cryomagma making contact with clathrate hydrates. Clathrate hydrates, if exposed to warm temperatures, readily decompose. A 1982 article pointed out the possibility that the production of pressurised gas upon destabilisation of clathrate hydrates making contact with warm rising magma could produce an explosion that breaks through the surface, resulting in explosive cryovolcanism.

==== Water vapor in a vacuum ====
If a fracture reaches the surface of an icy body and the column of rising water is exposed to the near-vacuum of the surface of most icy bodies, it will immediately start to boil, because its vapor pressure is much more than the ambient pressure. Not only that, but any volatiles in the water will exsolve. The combination of these processes will release droplets and vapor, which can rise up the fracture, creating a plume. This is thought to be partially responsible for Enceladus's ice plumes.

== See also ==
- Effusive eruption
- Volcanic explosivity index
