= Outline of Chad =

Landlocked country in Central Africa

The Flag of Chad

The Coat of arms of Chad

The location of Chad

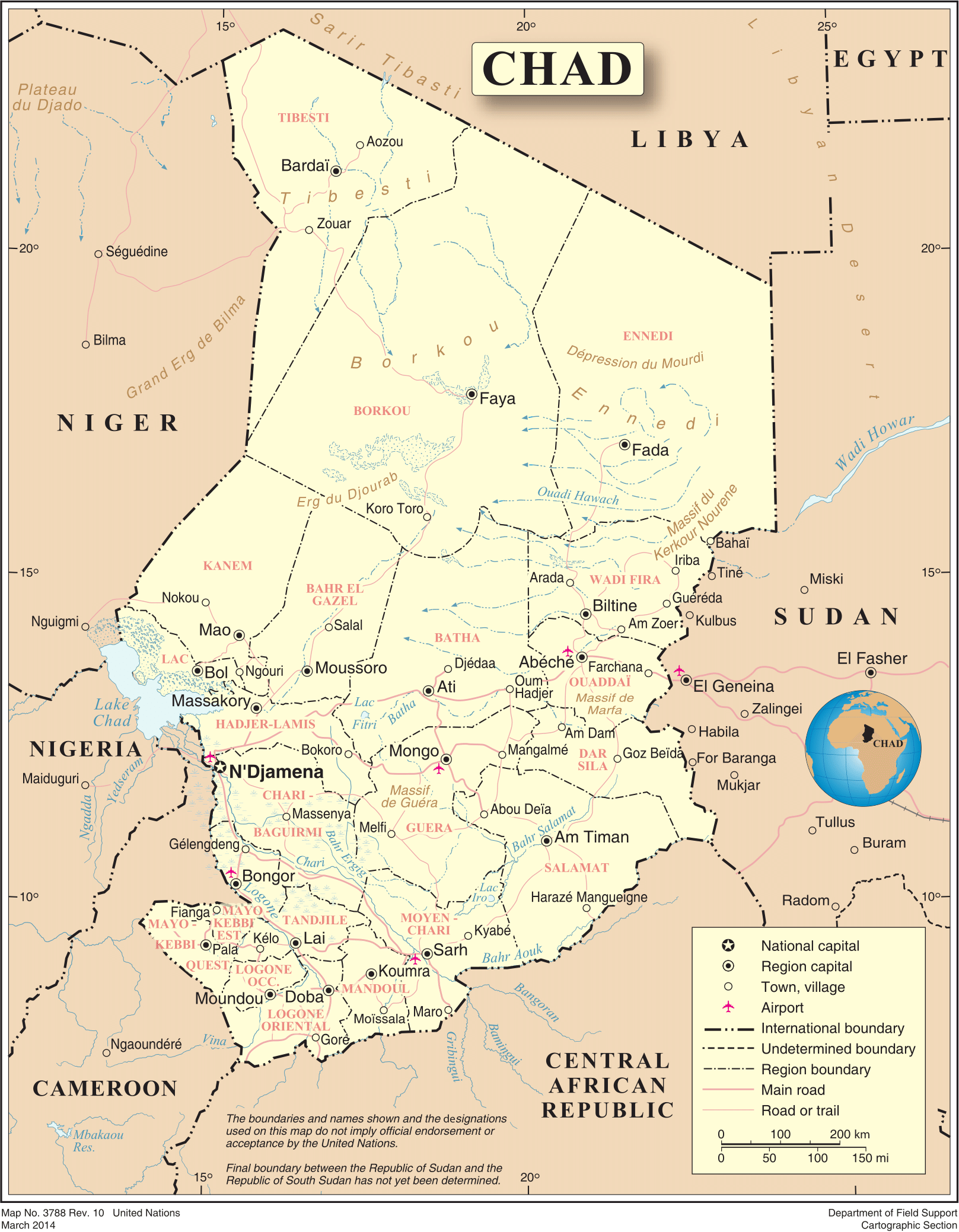
An enlargeable map of Chad

The following outline is provided as an overview of and topical guide to Chad:

Chad – landlocked country in Central Africa. It is bordered by Libya to the north, Sudan to the east, the Central African Republic to the south, Cameroon and Nigeria to the southwest, and Niger to the west. Due to its distance from the sea and its largely desert climate, the country is sometimes referred to as the "Dead Heart of Africa". Chad is divided into three major geographical regions: a desert zone in the north, an arid Sahelian belt in the centre and a more fertile Sudanese savanna zone in the south. Lake Chad, after which the country is named, is the largest wetland in Chad and the second largest in Africa. Chad's highest peak is the Emi Koussi in the Sahara, and N'Djamena, the capital, is the largest city. Chad is home to over 200 different ethnic and linguistic groups. Arabic and French are the official languages. Islam is the most widely practiced religion. While many political parties are active, power lies firmly in the hands of President Déby and his political party, the Patriotic Salvation Movement. Chad remains plagued by political violence and recurrent attempted coups d'état (see Battle of N'Djamena (2006) and Battle of N'Djamena (2008)). The country is one of the poorest and most corrupt countries in the world; most Chadians live in poverty as subsistence herders and farmers. Since 2003 crude oil has become the country's primary source of export earnings, superseding the traditional cotton industry.

== General reference ==
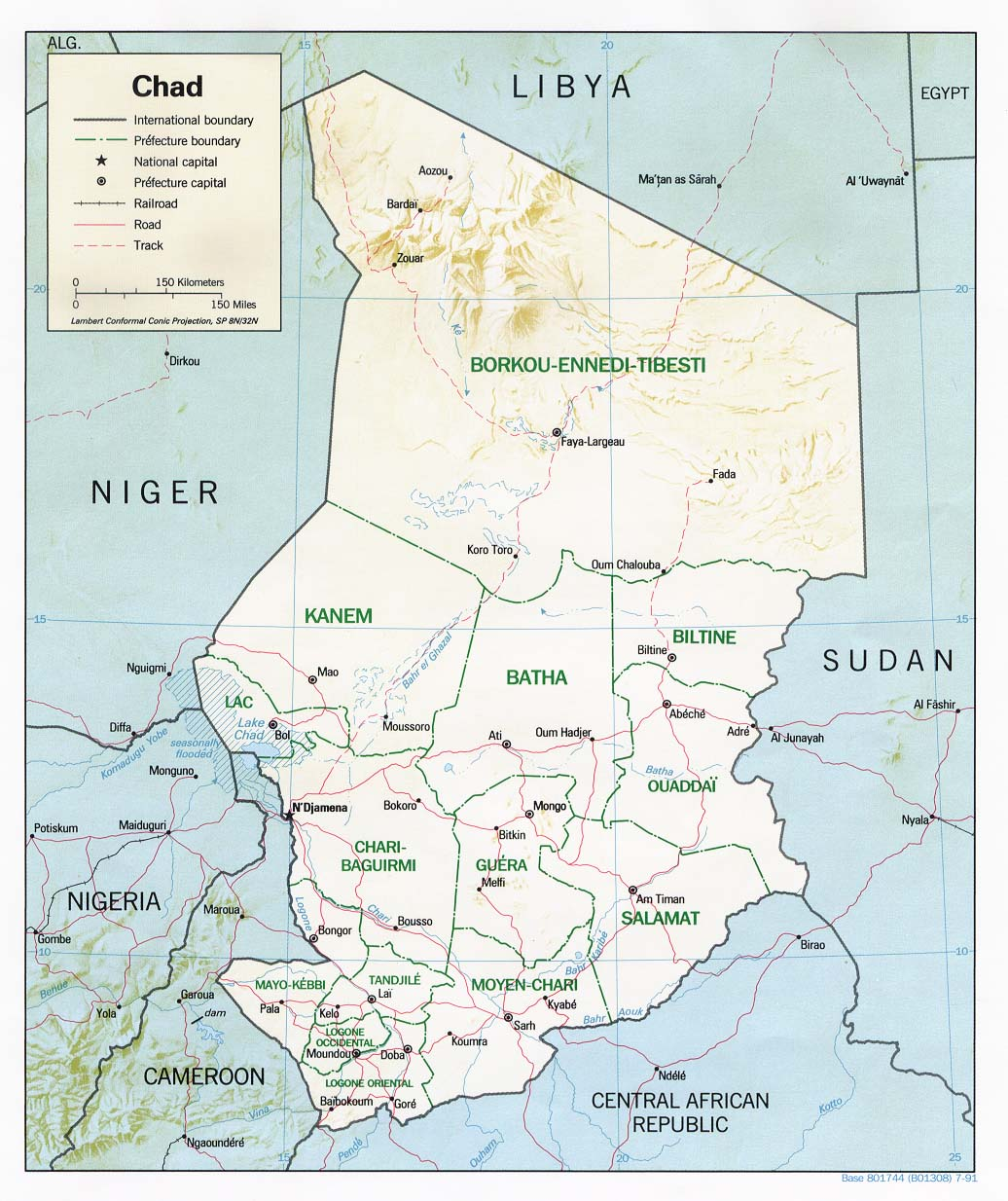
An enlargeable relief map of Chad

- Pronunciation: /tʃæd/
- Common English country name: Chad
- Official English country name: The Republic of Chad
- Common endonym(s): تشاد, Tchad
- Official endonym(s): جمهورية تشاد, République du Tchad
- Adjectival(s): Chadian
- Demonym(s): Chadian(s)
- ISO country codes: TD, TCD, 148
- ISO region codes: See ISO 3166-2:TD
- Internet country code top-level domain: .td

== Geography of Chad ==
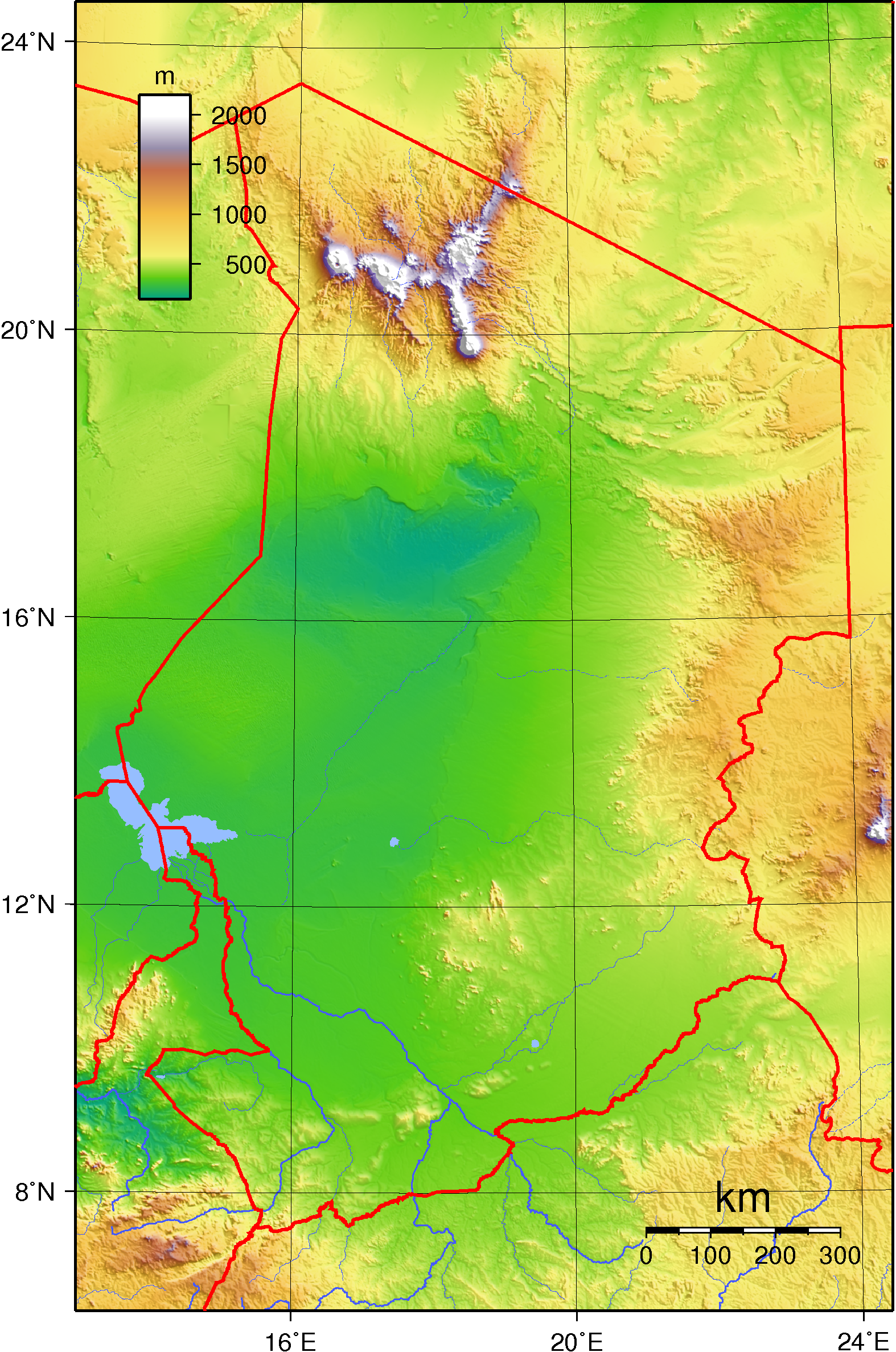
An enlargeable topographic map of Chad

Geography of Chad

- Chad is: a landlocked country
- Location:
  - Northern Hemisphere and Eastern Hemisphere
  - Africa
    - Central Africa
    - Middle Africa
    - North Africa
    - partially within the Sahara Desert
  - Time zone: West Africa Time (UTC+01)
  - Extreme points of Chad
    - High: Emi Koussi 3,445 m (11,302 ft)
    - Low: Bodélé Depression 160 m (525 ft)
  - Land boundaries: 5,968 km

Sudan 1,360 km
Central African Republic 1,197 km
Niger 1,175 km
Cameroon 1,094 km
Libya 1,055 km
Nigeria 87 km

  - Coastline: none
- Population of Chad: 10,780,600(2007) - 66th most populous country
- Area of Chad: 1,284,000 square kilometres (496,000 sq mi) - 21st largest country
- Atlas of Chad
- Top right corner of Chad has an angle of around 110 °

=== Environment of Chad ===
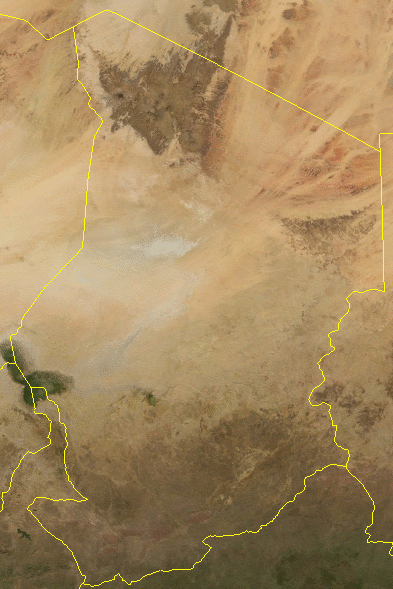
An enlargeable satellite image of Chad

- Climate of Chad
- Ecoregions in Chad
- Geology of Chad
- Protected areas of Chad
  - National parks of Chad
- Wildlife of Chad
  - Fauna of Chad
    - Birds of Chad
    - Mammals of Chad

==== Natural geographic features of Chad ====
- Glaciers in Chad: none
- Lakes of Chad
- Mountains of Chad
  - Volcanoes in Chad
- Rivers of Chad

=== Regions of Chad ===
==== Ecoregions of Chad ====
List of ecoregions in Chad

==== Administrative divisions of Chad ====
===== Provinces of Chad =====
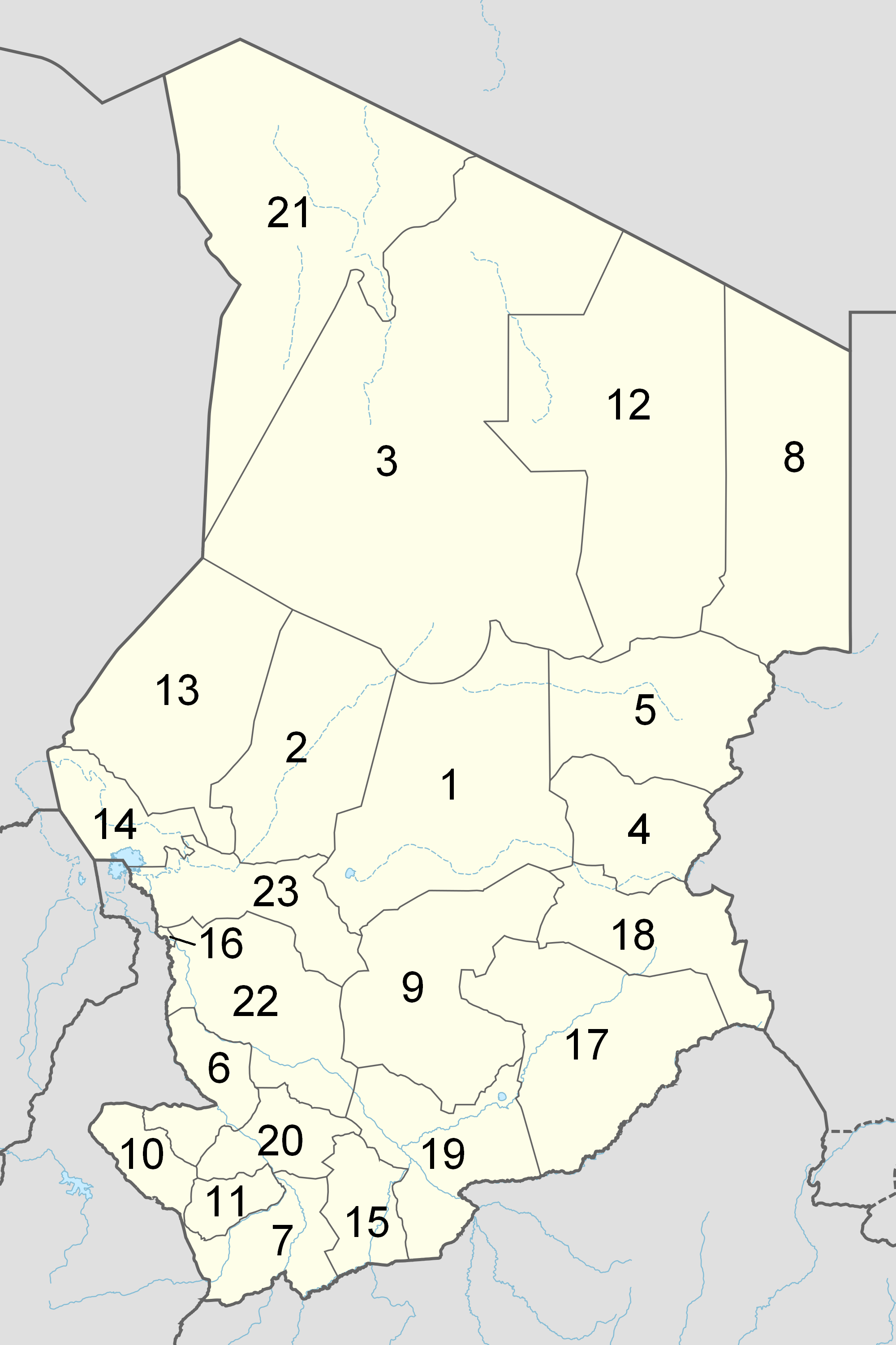

No.	Province
2	Bahr el-Gazel
1	Batha
3	Borkou
22	Chari-Baguirmi
8	Ennedi-Est
12	Ennedi-Ouest
9	Guéra
23	Hadjer-Lamis
13	Kanem
14	Lac
11	Logone Occidental
7	Logone Oriental
15	Mandoul
6	Mayo-Kebbi Est
10	Mayo-Kebbi Ouest
19	Moyen-Chari
4	Ouaddaï
17	Salamat
18	Sila
20	Tandjilé
21	Tibesti
5	Wadi Fira
16	N'Djamena (capital)

===== Departments of Chad =====
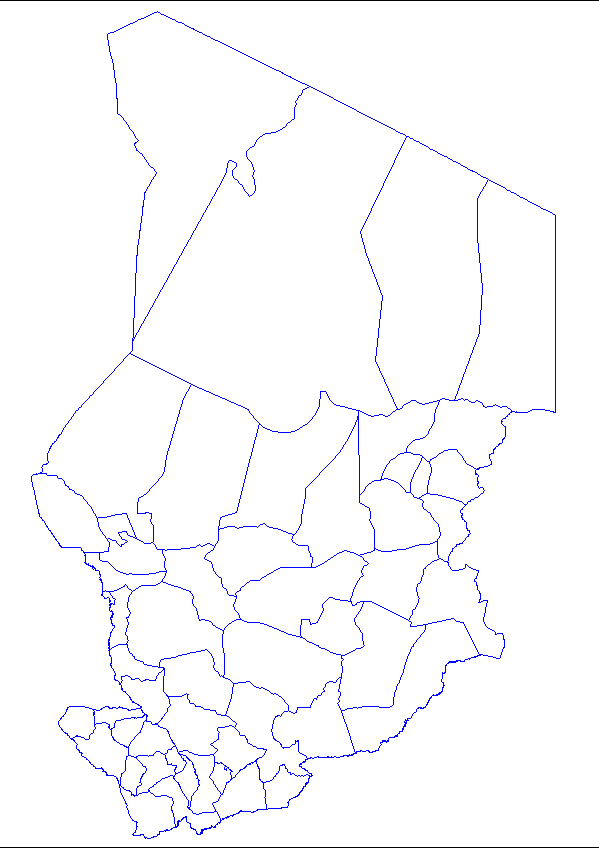
Departments of Chad

===== Sub-prefectures of Chad =====
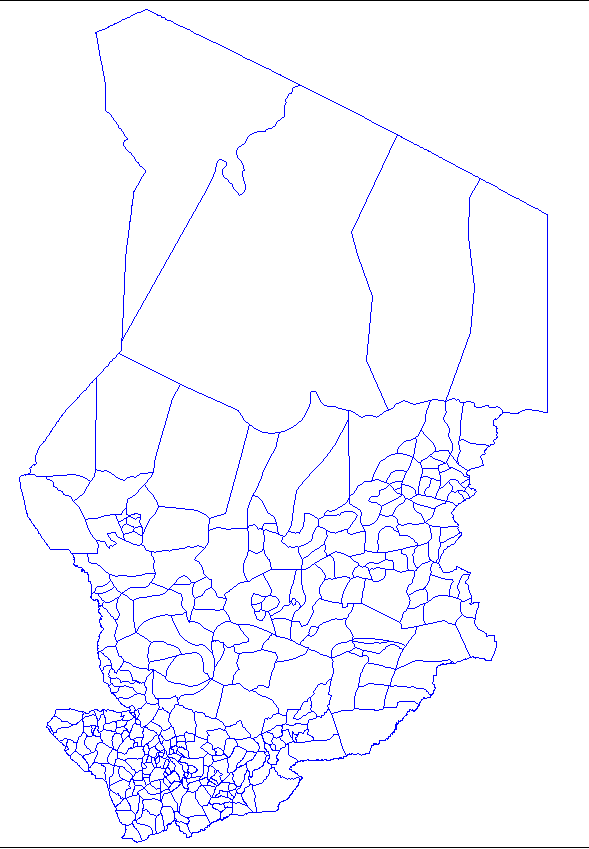

- Capital of Chad: N'Djamena
- Cities of Chad

== Government and politics of Chad ==
Politics of Chad

- Form of government: presidential republic
- Capital of Chad: N'Djamena
- Elections in Chad
- Political parties in Chad

=== Branches of government ===
Government of Chad

==== Executive branch of the government of Chad ====
- Head of state: President of Chad
- Head of government: Prime Minister of Chad

==== Legislative branch of the government of Chad ====
- National Assembly of Chad (unicameral)

==== Judicial branch of the government of Chad ====
Court system of Chad

- Supreme Court of Chad

=== Foreign relations of Chad ===
Foreign relations of Chad

- Diplomatic missions in Chad
- Diplomatic missions of Chad

==== International organization membership ====
The Republic of Chad is a member of:

- African, Caribbean, and Pacific Group of States (ACP)
- African Development Bank Group (AfDB)
- African Union (AU)
- Conference des Ministres des Finances des Pays de la Zone Franc (FZ)
- Development Bank of Central African States (BDEAC)
- Economic and Monetary Community of Central Africa (CEMAC)
- Food and Agriculture Organization (FAO)
- Group of 77 (G77)
- International Atomic Energy Agency (IAEA)
- International Bank for Reconstruction and Development (IBRD)
- International Civil Aviation Organization (ICAO)
- International Criminal Court (ICCt)
- International Criminal Police Organization (Interpol)
- International Development Association (IDA)
- International Federation of Red Cross and Red Crescent Societies (IFRCS)
- International Finance Corporation (IFC)
- International Fund for Agricultural Development (IFAD)
- International Labour Organization (ILO)
- International Monetary Fund (IMF)
- International Olympic Committee (IOC)
- International Red Cross and Red Crescent Movement (ICRM)
- International Telecommunication Union (ITU)
- International Telecommunications Satellite Organization (ITSO)
- International Trade Union Confederation (ITUC)
- Islamic Development Bank (IDB)
- Multilateral Investment Guarantee Agency (MIGA)
- Nonaligned Movement (NAM)
- Organisation internationale de la Francophonie (OIF)
- Organisation of Islamic Cooperation (OIC)
- Organisation for the Prohibition of Chemical Weapons (OPCW)
- United Nations (UN)
- United Nations Conference on Trade and Development (UNCTAD)
- United Nations Educational, Scientific, and Cultural Organization (UNESCO)
- United Nations Industrial Development Organization (UNIDO)
- United Nations Operation in Cote d'Ivoire (UNOCI)
- Universal Postal Union (UPU)
- World Confederation of Labour (WCL)
- World Customs Organization (WCO)
- World Federation of Trade Unions (WFTU)
- World Health Organization (WHO)
- World Intellectual Property Organization (WIPO)
- World Meteorological Organization (WMO)
- World Tourism Organization (UNWTO)
- World Trade Organization (WTO)

=== Law and order in Chad ===
- Constitution of Chad
- Human rights in Chad
  - LGBT rights in Chad
  - Human trafficking in Chad
  - Freedom of religion in Chad
- Law enforcement in Chad

=== Military of Chad ===
Military of Chad

- Command
  - Commander-in-chief:
- Forces
  - Army of Chad
  - Navy of Chad
  - Air Force of Chad
- Military history of Chad

=== Local government in Chad ===
Local government in Chad

== History of Chad ==
History of Chad

- Current events of Chad
- Military history of Chad

== Culture of Chad ==
Culture of Chad

- Chadian cuisine
- Languages of Chad
- National symbols of Chad
  - Coat of arms of Chad
  - Flag of Chad
  - National anthem of Chad
- People of Chad
- Public holidays in Chad
- Religion in Chad
  - Christianity in Chad
  - Hinduism in Chad
  - Islam in Chad

=== Art in Chad ===
- Literature of Chad
- Music of Chad

=== Sports in Chad ===
Sports in Chad

- Football in Chad
- Chad at the Olympics

== Economy and infrastructure of Chad ==
Economy of Chad

- Economic rank, by nominal GDP (2007): 128th (one hundred and twenty eighth)
- Agriculture in Chad
- Communications in Chad
  - Internet in Chad
- Companies of Chad
- Currency of Chad: Franc
  - ISO 4217: XAF
- Energy in Chad
- Health care in Chad
- Mining in Chad
- Petroleum industry in Chad
- Tourism in Chad
- Transport in Chad
  - Airports in Chad
  - Rail transport in Chad

== Education in Chad ==
Education in Chad

== Health in Chad ==
Health in Chad

== See also ==
Chad

- List of Chad-related topics
- List of international rankings
- Member state of the United Nations
- Outline of Africa
- Outline of geography
