= Telecommunications in Chad =

Telecommunications in Chad include radio, television, fixed and mobile telephones, and the Internet.

== Radio and television ==
Radio stations:

- state-owned radio network, Radiodiffusion Nationale Tchadienne (RNT), operates national and regional stations; about 10 private radio stations; some stations rebroadcast programs from international broadcasters (2007);
- 2 AM, 4 FM, and 5 shortwave stations (2001).

Radios: 1.7 million (1997).

Television stations:

- 1 state-owned TV station, Tele Tchad (2007);
- 1 station (2001).

Television sets: 10,000 (1997).

Radio is the most important medium of mass communication. State-run Radiodiffusion Nationale Tchadienne operates national and regional radio stations. Around a dozen private radio stations are on the air, despite high licensing fees, some run by religious or other non-profit groups. The BBC World Service (FM 90.6) and Radio France Internationale (RFI) broadcast in the capital, N'Djamena. The only television station, Tele Tchad, is state-owned.

State control of many broadcasting outlets allows few dissenting views. Journalists are harassed and attacked. On rare occasions journalists are warned in writing by the High Council for Communication to produce more "responsible" journalism or face fines. Some journalists and publishers practice self-censorship. On 10 October 2012, the High Council on Communications issued a formal warning to La Voix du Paysan, claiming that the station's live broadcast on 30 September incited the public to "insurrection against the government." The station had broadcast a sermon by a bishop who criticized the government for allegedly failing to use oil wealth to benefit the region.

== Telephones ==
Calling code: +235

International call prefix: 00

Main lines:

- 29,900 lines in use, 176th in the world (2012);
- 13,000 lines in use, 201st in the world (2004).

Mobile cellular:

- 4.2 million lines, 119th in the world (2012);
- 210,000 lines, 155th in the world (2005).

Telephone system: inadequate system of radiotelephone communication stations with high costs and low telephone density; fixed-line connections for less than 1 per 100 persons coupled with mobile-cellular subscribership base of only about 35 per 100 persons (2011).

Satellite earth stations: 1 Intelsat (Atlantic Ocean) (2011).

== Internet ==
Top-level domain: .td

Internet users:

- 230,489 users, 149th in the world; 2.1% of the population, 200th in the world (2012);
- 168,100 users, 145th in the world (2009);
- 35,000 users, 167th in the world (2005).

Fixed broadband: 18,000 subscriptions, 132nd in the world; 0.2% of the population, 161st in the world (2012).

Wireless broadband: Unknown (2012).

Internet hosts:

- 6 hosts, 229th in the world (2012);
- 9 hosts, 217th in the world (2006).

IPv4: 4,096 addresses allocated, less than 0.05% of the world total, 0.4 addresses per 1000 people (2012).

=== Internet censorship and surveillance ===
There are no government restrictions on access to the Internet or credible reports that the government monitors e-mail or Internet chat rooms. However, in September 2023 the government has banned Starlink on the country's territory. Illegal use, sale or purchase is punishable by imprisonment or penalty from 100 000 000 to 200 000 000 francs CFA (around 152 000 - €304 000 ).

The constitution provides for freedom of opinion, expression, and press, but the government does not always respect these rights. Private individuals are generally free to criticize the government without reprisal, but reporters and publishers risk harassment from authorities when publishing critical articles. The 2010 media law abolished prison sentences for defamation and insult, but prohibits "inciting racial, ethnic, or religious hatred," which is punishable by one to two years in prison and a fine of one to three million CFA francs ($2,000 to $6,000).

== See also ==
- Radiodiffusion Nationale Tchadienne, state-operated national radio broadcaster.
- Télé Tchad, state-operated national TV broadcaster.
- Societe des Telecommunications Internationales du Tchad (SotelTchad), telecommunications parastatal providing landline telephone and Internet services.
- List of terrestrial fibre optic cable projects in Africa
- Media of Chad
- Economy of Chad
- Chad
