= Fishing industry in Chad =

Lake Chad, with its two major rivers and many runoff zones, was ranked high among Africa's producers of inland freshwater fish in the 1970s. With the drought and diversion of the waters of some rivers, however, production declined in the 1980s. Traditionally, fish have been an important source of protein for those living along the rivers and lakes, and fishing was also a means of earning money. Because it was practiced in an entirely traditional manner and totally outside the control of government or modern commercial enterprises, there was no accurate statistical information on fishing.

In the 1960s, 1970s, and 1980s, total production of fish was estimated at between 60,000 and 120,000 tons per year. But because these figures represent production for the Logone River and Lake Chad, which are shared with Cameroon, Niger, and Nigeria, Chad's fish production amounted to an estimated 70 percent of the total. The largest part of the catch—perhaps two-thirds—was consumed locally. In areas adjacent to urban centers, some portion—usually the best of the catch, such as large Nile perch (called capitaine in Chad)—was marketed fresh. Along Lake Chad and the river borders with Cameroon, the surplus catch was dried, salted, or smoked before being sold. Between 1976 and 1985, production of dried, salted, or smoked fish was estimated at 20,000 tons annually, representing from 20 to 25 percent of Chad's total annual catch. A large share of the commerce in preserved fish was carried on with markets in Cameroon and Nigeria. Small dried or salted fish called salanga were most popular on the markets of Cameroon. Larger smoked fish called banda were generally exported to the major Nigerian market of Maiduguri.

Through the mid-1980s, Chad had taken few steps to control or modernize fishing or to promote fish conservation, although some plans had been made in the 1960s and 1970s. Perhaps the most significant innovation applied by Chadian fishermen has been their use of nylon netting, which began in the 1960s. During the periods of conflict, no government plans could be carried out to control fishing. Although considerable potential existed for the development of the Chadian fishing industry, because of insufficient government interest traditional production and marketing of freshwater fish was likely to remain unchanged for the near term.

== See also ==
- Agriculture in Chad
- Economy of Chad
