= List of companies of Chad =

Location of Chad

Chad is a landlocked country in Central Africa. Chad's currency is the CFA franc. In the 1960s, the Mining industry of Chad produced sodium carbonate, or natron. There have also been reports of gold-bearing quartz in the Biltine Prefecture. However, years of civil war have scared away foreign investors; those who left Chad between 1979 and 1982 have only recently begun to regain confidence in the country's future. In 2000 major direct foreign investment in the oil sector began, boosting the country's economic prospects.

== Notable firms ==
This list includes notable companies with primary headquarters located in the country. The industry and sector follow the Industry Classification Benchmark taxonomy. Organizations which have ceased operations are included and noted as defunct.

Notable companies Status: P=Private, S=State; A=Active, D=Defunct
Name	Industry	Sector	Headquarters	Founded	Notes	Status	
Commercial Bank Chad	Financials	Banks	N'Djamena	1998	Part of the Commercial Bank Group (Cameroon)	P	A
Cotontchad	Basic materials	Basic resources	N'Djamena	1971	Cotton exporter	S	A
Mid Express Tchad	Industrials	Delivery services	N'Djamena	2009	Cargo airline	P	A
Société tchadienne des postes et de l'épargne	Industrials	Delivery services	N'Djamena	1961	Postal services	P	A
SotelTchad (N'Djamena)	Telecommunications	Fixed line telecommunications	N'Djamena	2000	Telecom	P	A
Toumaï Air Tchad	Consumer services	Airlines	N'Djamena	2004	Airline, travel agency	P	A

== See also ==
- Economy of Chad
