= Télé Tchad =

National broadcaster of Chad

- Type: Broadcast
- Country: Chad
- Availability: National/ International
- Owner: Government of Chad
- Official website: onama.td//

Télé Tchad is the national broadcaster of the Central African state of Chad. It broadcasts in Arabic and French. It primarily broadcasts news, educational programming, cultural, religious, and local sport programming 20 hours a day.

The national broadcaster is seen as favoring the government. Reporters Without Borders frequently lists Chad near the bottom of its list of World Press Freedom rankings, due to "Violence, arbitrary arrest and cyber-censorship for journalists in Chad".

== History ==
Télé Tchad began broadcasting on December 10, 1987. Upon its debut, the channel only broadcast four days a week (Thursday through Sunday) and only broadcast in and around N'Djamena through a tower (100W, channel 7) in the Goudji neighborhood. Originally, the station used journalists and personalities from Chadian radio, including Malla Woulou Yakéma, Topono Celestin, and Aldom Nadji Tito. In its early years, the broadcaster received technical support and supplies from West Germany and from Télédiffusion de France.

When Idriss Déby took power in Chad in 1990, he put the broadcaster under the control of the Ministry of Information. In the 90s, the channel was broadcasting Tuesdays to Sundays, with no programming on Mondays.

In 2008 the broadcaster expanded, including stations in Mongo, Borkou, Doba, Biltine and Tibesti as well as a satellite service that was able to broadcast to the Chadian diaspora in Europe, North Africa and elsewhere.

In 2012, the broadcaster had a new headquarters built on Avenue Charles de Gaulle in N'Djamena at the cost of 19 billion CFA francs. The building, which houses both Tele Tchad and Radiodiffusion Nationale Tchadienne, is 70 meters tall and includes the broadcast tower.

In October 2019, the head of the channel was fired for what was believed to be political reasons. The same happened to the director of news programs in October 2021.

== See also ==
- Media of Chad
- Telecommunications in Chad
