= Forestry in Chad =

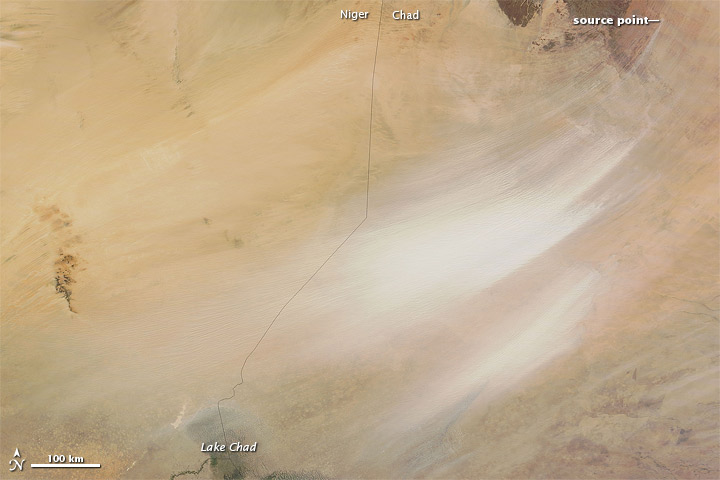
Dust storm over Chad. Desertification of this large African nation has contributed to the demise of a viable forestry industry.

Like most states of the African Sahel, Chad has suffered desertification—the encroachment of the desert. Traditional herding practices and the need for firewood and wood for construction have exacerbated the problem. In the early 1980s, the country possessed between 135,000 and 160,000 square kilometres of forest and woodlands, representing a decline of almost 14% from the early 1960s. To what extent this decline was caused by climatic changes and to what extent by herding and cutting practices is unknown. Regulation was difficult because some people traditionally made their living selling wood and charcoal for fuel and wood for construction to people in the urban center. Although the government attempted to limit wood brought into the capital, the attempts have not been well managed, and unrestricted cutting of woodlands remained a problem.

== Tree cover extent and loss ==
Global Forest Watch publishes annual estimates of tree cover loss and 2000 tree cover extent derived from time-series analysis of Landsat satellite imagery in the Global Forest Change dataset. In this framework, tree cover refers to vegetation taller than 5 m (including natural forests and tree plantations), and tree cover loss is defined as the complete removal of tree cover canopy for a given year, regardless of cause.

For Chad, country statistics report cumulative tree cover loss of 84,624 ha (846.24 km^{2}) from 2001 to 2024 (about 20.7% of its 2000 tree cover area). For tree cover density greater than 30%, country statistics report a 2000 tree cover extent of 409,750 ha (4,097.5 km^{2}). The charts and table below display this data. In simple terms, the annual loss number is the area where tree cover disappeared in that year, and the extent number shows what remains of the 2000 tree cover baseline after subtracting cumulative loss. Forest regrowth is not included in the dataset.

Annual tree cover loss in Chad, 2001–2024. View chart definition.
Tree cover extent in 2000 minus cumulative tree cover loss in Chad, 2001–2024 (loss-only residual; does not account for gain). View chart definition.

Annual tree cover extent and loss
| Year | Tree cover extent (km2) (Note: This residual measure does not include forest regrowth.) | Annual tree cover loss (km2) |
|---|---|---|
| 2001 | 4,088.67 | 8.83 |
| 2002 | 4,069.08 | 19.59 |
| 2003 | 4,067.15 | 1.93 |
| 2004 | 4,062.58 | 4.57 |
| 2005 | 4,057.85 | 4.73 |
| 2006 | 4,028.03 | 29.82 |
| 2007 | 4,018.02 | 10.01 |
| 2008 | 3,983.99 | 34.03 |
| 2009 | 3,973.34 | 10.65 |
| 2010 | 3,970.80 | 2.54 |
| 2011 | 3,961.60 | 9.20 |
| 2012 | 3,936.69 | 24.91 |
| 2013 | 3,907.74 | 28.95 |
| 2014 | 3,877.73 | 30.01 |
| 2015 | 3,851.82 | 25.91 |
| 2016 | 3,820.16 | 31.66 |
| 2017 | 3,752.51 | 67.65 |
| 2018 | 3,683.20 | 69.31 |
| 2019 | 3,632.61 | 50.59 |
| 2020 | 3,598.27 | 34.34 |
| 2021 | 3,547.31 | 50.96 |
| 2022 | 3,492.86 | 54.45 |
| 2023 | 3,382.19 | 110.67 |
| 2024 | 3,251.26 | 130.93 |

== See also ==
- Agriculture in Chad
- Economy of Chad
