= List of ecoregions in Chad =

The following is a list of ecoregions in Chad, according to the Worldwide Fund for Nature (WWF).

== Terrestrial ecoregions ==
By major habitat type:

=== Tropical and subtropical grasslands, savannas, and shrublands ===
- East Sudanian savanna
- Sahelian Acacia savanna

=== Flooded grasslands and savannas ===
- Lake Chad flooded savanna

=== Deserts and xeric shrublands ===
- East Saharan montane xeric woodlands
- Sahara Desert
- South Saharan steppe and woodlands
- Tibesti-Jebel Uweinat montane xeric woodlands

== Freshwater ecoregions ==
By bioregion:

=== Nilo-Sudan ===
- Dry Sahel
- Lake Chad catchment
