= Radiodiffusion Nationale Tchadienne =

Radio station in Chad

Coordinates: 12.0963°N 15.0595°E

Radiodiffusion Nationale Tchadienne (French pronunciation: [ʁadjodifyzjɔ̃ nɑsjɔnal tʃadjɛn]; "Chadian National Radio"; RNT) is the state-operated national radio broadcaster of Chad. RNT was able to reach the entire country through transmitters located at N'Djamena, Sarh, Moundou, and Abéché as of 1988.

RNT was created in December 1987. From N’Djamena, RNT broadcasts in seven African languages as well as in French and Arabic.

RNT operates the state TV-station Tele Tchad (ONRTV).

== See also ==
- Media of Chad
