= Agriculture in Chad =

In 2020, approximately 80% of Chad's labor force was employed in the agricultural sector. This sector of the economy accounts for 52.3% of the GDP, as of 2017. With the exception of cotton production, some small-scale sugar cane production, and a portion of the peanut crop, Chad's agriculture consists of subsistence food production.

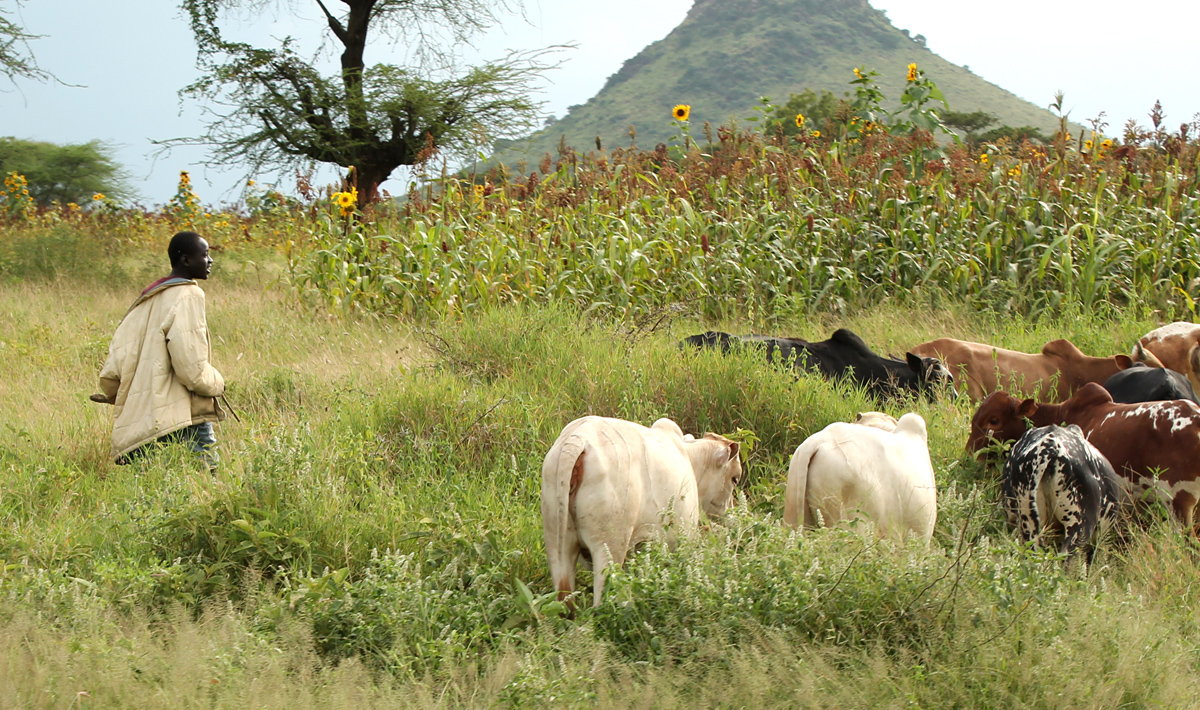
A farmer in a field.

The East Sudanian savanna, which accounts for about 10% of the total land area, contains the nation's most fertile croplands. Settled agricultural communities growing a wide variety of food crops are its main features. Fishing is important in the rivers, and families raise goats, chickens, and, in some cases, oxen for plowing. In 1983 about 72% of all land under cultivation in Chad was in the East Sudanian savanna.

== Production ==
Chad agricultural production in 2018:

- 987 thousand tons of sorghum;
- 893 thousand tons of peanut;
- 756 thousand tons of millet;
- 484 thousand tonnes of yam (8th largest producer in the world);
- 475 thousand tons of sugarcane;
- 437 thousand tons of maize;
- 284 thousand tons of cassava;
- 259 thousand tons of rice;
- 255 thousand tons of sweet potato;
- 172 thousand tons of sesame seed;
- 151 thousand tons of bean;
- 120 thousand tons of cotton;

In addition to smaller productions of other agricultural products.

=== Crop rotation ===
Crop rotation in the East Sudanian savanna traditionally begins with sorghum or millet in the first year. Mixed crops of sorghum and-or millet, with peanuts, legumes, or tubers, are then cultivated for approximately three years. Farmers then return the land to fallow for periods up to fifteen years, turning to different fields for the next cycle. Preparation of a field begins with cutting heavy bush and unwanted low trees or branches that are then laid on the ground. Collectively owned lands are parceled out during the dry season, and the fields are burned just before the onset of the first rains, usually around March. Farmers work most intensively during the rains between May and October, planting, weeding and protecting the crops from birds and animals. Harvesting begins in September and October with the early varieties of sorghum. The main harvest occurs in November and December. Farmers harvest crops of rice and berebere, the hardiest of Chad's varieties of millet, grown along receding water courses, as late as February.

=== Central zone ===
The central zone, or the Sahel, comprises the area with average annual rainfall of between 350 and 800 millimeters. The minimum rainfall needed for berebere, is 350 millimeters. The western area of the zone is dominated by the Chari and Logone rivers, which flow north from their sources in southern Chad and neighboring countries. The courses of these rivers, joining at N'Djamena to flow on to Lake Chad, create an ecological subregion. Fishing is important for the peoples along the rivers and along the shores of Lake Chad. Flood recession cropping is practiced along the edges of the riverbeds and lakeshore, areas that have held the most promise for irrigation in the zone. International donor attention focused on this potential beginning in the mid-1960s. Particular attention has been paid to the traditional construction of polders (see Glossary) along the shores of Lake Chad. Land reclaimed by the use of such methods is extremely fertile. Chad's only wheat crop is cultivated in these polders.

In the rest of the Sahel, the hardier varieties of millet, along with peanuts and dry beans, are grown. Crop yields are far lower than they are in the south or near rivers and lakes. Farmers take every advantage of seasonal flooding to grow recession crops before the waters dry away, a practice particularly popular around Lake Fitri. The Sahel is ideal for pasturage. Herding includes large cattle herds for commercial sale, and goats, sheep, donkeys, and some horses are common in all villages.

==== Crop rotation ====
The cropping cycle for most of the Sahel is similar to that in the East Sudanian savanna, although the variety of crops planted is more limited because of dryness. In the polders of Lake Chad, farmers grow a wide range of crops; two harvests per year for corn, sorghum, and legumes are possible from February or March to September. Rice ripens in February, and wheat ripens in May.

=== Saharan zone ===
The Saharan Zone encompasses roughly the northern half of Chad. Except for some dates and legumes grown in the scattered oases, the area is not productive. Annual rainfall averages less than 350 millimeters (14 in), and the land is sparsely populated by nomadic tribes. Many of Chad's camel herds are found in the region, but there are few cattle or horses.

=== Subsistence farming ===
Chad's subsistence farmers practice traditional slash-and-burn agriculture in tandem with crop rotation, which is typical throughout much of Africa. Sorghum is the most important food crop, followed by berebere. Less prevalent grains are corn, rice, and wheat. Other secondary crops include peanuts, sesame, legumes, and tubers, as well as a variety of garden vegetables.

=== Land tenure ===
As with most Third World countries, control of the land determines agricultural practices. There are three basic types of land tenure in Chad.

==== Collective ownership ====
The first is collective ownership by villages of croplands in their environs. In principle, such lands belong to a village collectively under the management of the village chief or the traditional chef des terres (chief of the lands). Individual farmers hold inalienable and transmittable use rights to village lands, so long as they, their heirs, or recognized representatives cultivate the land. Outsiders can farm village lands only with the authorization of the village chiefs or chef des terres. Renting village farmlands is possible in some local areas but is not traditional practice.

==== Private ownership ====
Private ownership is the second type of tenure, applied traditionally to the small plots cultivated in wadis or oases. Wells belong to individuals or groups with rights to the land. Ownership of fruit trees and date palms in the oases is often separate from ownership of the land; those farmers who plant and care for trees own them.

==== State ownership ====
State ownership is the third type, primarily for large enterprises such as irrigation projects. Under the management of parastatal or government employees, farmers enter into contractual arrangements, including paying fees, for the use of state lands and the benefits of improved farming methods.

=== Agricultural statistics ===
Detailed and reliable statistical information on Chad's agriculture was scarce in the late 1980s; most researchers viewed available statistics only as indicators of general trends. The one region for which figures were kept was the East Sudanian savanna through survey coverage by officials of the National Office of Rural Development (Chad) (Office National de Dévelopment Rural)(ONDR), who monitored cotton production. These officials also gathered information on food production, but this effort was not carried out systematically. Survey coverage of the Sahel was first hampered, then prevented, by civil conflict from the mid-1970s to the early 1980s.

Moreover, figures from international and regional organizations often conflicted or differed in formulation. For example, total area devoted to food production was difficult to estimate because sources combined the area of fields in production with those lying fallow to give a total for Arable lands. The Arable land figure has shown a gradual increase since 1961. Estimated then at 29,000 square kilometres (11,325 sq. mls), it rose to almost 32,000 square kilometres (12,500 sq. mls.) in 1984. In 1983 there were about 12,000 square kilometres (4,686 sq. mls.) in food production and in 1984 slightly more than 9,000 square kilometres (3,515 sq. mls). Therefore, perhaps a third of Chad's farmlands were in production in a given year, with the balance lying fallow.

== Cotton ==
Cotton is an indigenous crop to southern Chad. Most of the production occurs in the five Sudanian prefectures of Mayo-Kebbi, Tandjilé, Logone Occidental, Logone Oriental, and Moyen-Chari, plus the Bousso region of Chari-Baguirmi Prefecture. Few other areas have enough water and population to sustain its production. Commonly, the cotton cultivation has occurred next to food crops.

== Subsistence farming ==
Since the 1950s, Chad's food production has declined. Even so, despite pockets of malnutrition remaining in areas where rains failed or locusts damaged local crops, the overall picture for Chad's food production was good in the 1985-87 period. The rebound of food production in this period was the result of good rains, the return of political stability, and the absence of major conflict in the Sahelian and East Sudanian savannas. The downturn in cotton production and added restrictions on its cultivation also released lands and labor for farmers to put into food production. Production was so high in these years that, for the first time in a decade, it was estimated that Chad had returned to food sufficiency. This followed a cereal shortfall in the drought years of 1984 and 1985 of around 325,000 tons. Total cereal production rose thereafter to the 700,000-ton level, well above the estimated 615,000 tons of grains needed for food sufficiency.

Yet the overall food sufficiency registered by Chad in these years served to underscore the problem of regional imbalances in cereal production. The Sahel experienced a chronic shortfall in cereal production, whereas the East Sudanian savannas traditionally had a cereal surplus. The East Sudanian savannas was also the biggest producer of all subsistence food crops and of cash crops. It was estimated that the East Sudanian savannas produced between 53 and 77% of Chad's total cereal production from 1976 to 1985, with the average falling in the 60- to 70-% range. But because the populations of the two regions were approximately equal, the lack of a good transport system and marketing mechanisms to allow the rapid transfer of the southern surplus to the northern zones was a constant problem. This danger was especially threatening during times of drought affecting the Sahel.

=== Sorghum and millet ===
Chad's most important subsistence crops were sorghum, millet, and berebere. Areas under production for these grains showed a downward trend after the mid-1950s, dropping from an average of 15,000 square kilometres to around 10,000 square kilometres in the 1960s and 1970s and falling to levels averaging 7,500 square kilometres between 1981 and 1986. Taking an average for all lands devoted to grain production during the years from 1981 to 1985, according to the Food and Agriculture Organization (FAO), sorghum and millet cultivation accounted for 85% of the total area. Between 1980 and 1985, these coarse grains accounted for 80 to 95% of all grain production.

=== Wheat ===
In 1987 wheat was Chad's least important cereal grain. Farmers planted the crop in polders around the shores of Lake Chad, and some small planting also was done in the oases and wadis of northern Chad. Replacing an earlier state operation, the Organization for the Development of the Lake (Société pour le Développement du Lac—SODELAC) was founded in 1967 to organize cultivation and provide wheat for the state-owned flour mill at N'Djamena, the Grands Moulins du Tchad. The flour mill began operations in 1964 but closed in 1980; as of 1987, operations had not resumed. In the late 1970s, plans to plant some 200 square kilometres of wheat in polders failed because warfare around Lake Chad affected the infrastructure of SODELAC and the construction of new polders and because farmers resisted SODELAC-controlled production.

Wheat production generally followed trends similar to the production of other cereals, remaining low in the 1960s and 1970s but reaching a high in 1983. In 1984, however, production fell sharply. The bulk of wheat was traded through traditional channels to those herders in the northern regions of Chad who preferred wheat to millet or sorghum.

=== Rice and corn ===
At the time of the French conquest, rice was grown on a small scale. Before World War I, the Germans on the Cameroon side of the Logone River encouraged the spread of rice cultivation. By World War II, the French imposed cultivation in the areas of southern Chad near Laï and Kélo, along the Logone River. Although production was destined originally for colonial troops, the taste for rice spread in some localities. What was originally intended by the French as a commercial cash crop had become a local subsistence crop by the 1980s.

The Development Office for Sategui Deressia (Office de Mise en Valeur de Sategui-Deressia--OMVSD), founded in 1976, replaced Experimental Sectors for Agricultural Modernization (Secteurs Expérimentaux de Modernisation Agricole—SEMAA), originally responsible for the organization, improvement, transformation, and commercialization of rice. Efforts by these organizations to extend commercial rice cultivation had mixed results. The area under rice cultivation has increased since the 1950s. Yet even in the 1980s, the greater part of this area was cultivated by traditional means. Schemes for controlled paddies at Bongor and Laï put only 35 square kilometres and 18 square kilometres, respectively, into cultivation before political events of the late 1970s and early 1980s disrupted efforts and international donor funding ceased. The bulk of rice production from traditional floodwater paddies was traded to the towns and cities or was consumed locally.

Corn was a crop of minor importance, grown in and around village gardens for local consumption. Production from the late 1960s through the mid-1980s remained in the 20,000- to 30,000-ton range. By 1987 no efforts at commercialization had been made, nor had the government tried to improve and extend corn production.

=== Peanuts ===
Peanuts have become an important food crop in Chad. Peanuts were eaten roasted or dry, and their oil was used in cooking. Peanuts were cultivated in both the soudanian and the Sahels. Production of peanuts was more stable than that of any other major crop, staying in the 90,000- to 100,000-ton range from the 1950s through 1987, with dips in drought years. The area under peanut production also remained stable, although kilograms-per-hectare yields declined slightly. The droughtresistant nature of peanuts made their production particularly important for the peoples of the Sahel, where peanuts were planted alone or in combination with millet in the first year of rotation; in the soudanian region, peanuts were traditionally planted in the third year of crop rotation.

Although considerable efforts were made to commercialize peanut production, most efforts failed. Through the 1960s and 1970s, about 97% of the annual crop went to local consumption. What remained was sold to various edible oil manufacturing concerns, none of which succeeded. For example, a Chinese-built peanut oil mill at Abéché, finished in 1969, never operated. Local farmers sold surplus peanuts through traditional channels, rather than to the state monopoly set up in 1965, the National Trading Company of Chad (Société Nationale de Commercialisation du Tchad—SONACOT). This parastatal bought local produce for sale abroad or domestically to state-run commercial operations. Unlike Cotontchad, SONACOT was never given the means to compel farmers to sell their crops, and it did not have the resources to compete with prices offered by traditional traders. With the collapse of central authority in 1979, SONACOT disappeared. The only commercial sales of peanuts were then limited to Cotontchad purchases in the south, but by 1987 these had been halted to reduce costs.

=== Tubers ===
The importance of tubers has grown dramatically over the years. Cassava and yams were the most important crops in this category, with much smaller production of potatoes, sweet potatoes, and coco yams (taro). Grown only in the East Sudanian savannas, tubers were once neglected, although such cultivation is widespread in other parts of subtropical West Africa. Estimates in the 1950s put tuber production at 50,000 tons annually. Production rose and by 1961 it exceeded 200,000 tons. From 1961 to 1984, the proportion of roots and tubers in the national diet rose from 6 to 17%. The reason for this important shift in eating habits among people of the East Sudanian savannas was the hedge these crops provided against famine in years when drought reduced millet and sorghum production.

== Livestock ==
Livestock raising, and in particular cattle herding, is a major economic activity. Animal husbandry was the main source of livelihood for perhaps a third of Chad's people. The growing importance of cattle and meat exports underscored this point. In the 1960s and 1970s, these exports were estimated at between 25 and 30% of all merchandise exports. The proportion of these exports grew in the 1980s as the value of cotton exports declined. It was impossible, however, to know with certainty the actual values of cattle exports. For processed meat exports, less uncertainty existed because these exports were controlled from the slaughterhouse to the point of export; in 1985 processed meat exports represented less than 1% of all merchandise exports. The real value of Chad's cattle herds was in the export by traditional traders to markets in Cameroon and Nigeria. These "on the hoof" exports passed largely outside the control of customs services. Therefore, these exports were neither counted nor taxed. Perhaps one-fourth of cattle's estimated 30-percent share of total exports, was officially recorded.

The size of Chad's herds was also difficult to determine. Considered to have declined in the mid-1970s and again in the early 1980s because of drought and warfare across the Sahel, estimated to be growing at a rate of 4% annually. Food and Agriculture Organization of the United Nations estimates that in 2018 Chad possessed 107 million heads of livestock: 37 million goats, 31 million sheep, 29 million cattle, and 8 million camels.

Before the drought of the 1980s, the Sahel held the largest herds, with about 80% of the total cattle herd. Smaller numbers of cattle were found in the East Sudanian savannas, along with about 100,000 buffaloes used in plowing cotton fields. Camel herds were concentrated in the dry northern regions. Herders practiced transhumance—seasonal migrations along fairly well set patterns.

With the 1984-85 drought, transhumance patterns changed. Camels were brought farther south into the Sahel in search of water. Cattle were herded even farther south, sometimes through Salamat Prefecture into Central African Republic.

The government and international donor community had contemplated considerable improvements for Chad's livestock management, but these plans were undermined by the Chadian Civil War, political instability, and an inadequate infrastructure. The most successful programs have been animal vaccination campaigns, such as an emergency project carried out in 1983 to halt the spread of rinderpest. The campaign reached some 4.7 million head of cattle across the nation and demonstrated the capabilities of Chad's animal health service when given external support. The Livestock and Veterinary Medicine Institute of Chad (Institut d'Elevage et de Médecine Vétérinaire du Tchad--IEMVT), which was financed by foreign aid, was capable of producing vaccines for Chad as well as for neighboring countries. Despite plant capacity, by 1984 a lack of a trained staff limited production to vaccines for anthrax and pasteurellosis.

Two institutional efforts to manage cattle marketing were attempted in the 1970s and 1980s. The Chadian Animal Resources Improvement Company (Société Tchadienne d'Exploitation des Ressources Animales—SOTERA), a mixed enterprise formed as a livestock company with participation by some traditional livestock traders, began operations in 1978. Its aim was to control live animal exports through a license system and to have a monopoly on exports of chilled meat and hides. It was hoped at the time that the association of traders to SOTERA would increase the effective collection of export taxes on livestock by 50 to 75%. By 1984, however, SOTERA handled only a small portion of the domestic market and less than 30% of the export trade. A second institution, the Center for the Modernization of Animal Production (Centre de Modernisation des Productions Animales—CMPA), was engaged in marketing dairy products, supplying chicks to farmers, and overseeing the sale of eggs and the processing of feed. But, among other problems, the CMPA was unable to compete with local traders for milk needed to produce cheese for sale. Although highly subsidized, this venture also was unsuccessful and demonstrated the resilience of the traditional private network for marketing produce. Collelo, Thomas, ed. (1990). Chad: A Country Study (2nd ed.). Washington, D.C.: Federal Research Division, Library of Congress. pp. 92–106. ISBN 0-16-024770-5. Public Domain This article incorporates text from this source, which is in the public domain.

Despite these institutional difficulties, the international community continued to support efforts to expand animal health services to Chad's herders. Some estimates suggest that the nation's herds could be increased by 35% if the distribution of water were improved, extension services were made more available, and animal health services were expanded.

== See also ==
- Forestry in Chad
- Fishing in Chad
