= Sports in Chad =

The principal sports of Chad are football, basketball, athletics, boxing, martial arts and fishing, which is mostly known in Lake Chad. The national stadium is the Stade Nacional in the capital, N'Djamena.

== Football in Chad ==
Football in Chad
- Governing body: Chadian Football Federation
- National team: men's national team

Club competitions
- Chad Premier League

International competitions
- Champions League; CAF Confederation Cup; Super Cup; FIFA Club World Cup; FIFA World Cup (National Team); African Cup of Nations (National Team)

A football player playing for the Chad national football team.

Football is by far the most popular sport in Chad. Approximately 30% of the people in Chad are considered association football fans. Many of top Chadian footballers have played professionally in France. According to one source, Nambatingue Tokomon, known as "Toko", played for renowned French soccer clubs, including Paris St. Germain, in the 1970s and 1980s. Abdoulay Karateka also played for Paris St. Germain. Ndoram Japhet played for Nantes and Monaco in the 1990s. The national team represents football in Chad internationally, however, the squad has never qualified for the FIFA World Cup or the African Cup of Nations. They did not enter qualification tournaments for the World Cup until 2002.

== Judo in Chad ==
Judo is increasingly popular in Chad, and in 2017 the newly appointed president of the National Olympic Committee of Chad was the president of the Chadian Judo Federation, Abakar Djermah. At the 2012 Summer Olympics, one of Chad's only two competitors at the London Games was the judoka Carine Ngarlemdana. The Chadian Judo Federation organises an international judo tournament held in N'Djamena involving other African nations. In November 2020, N'Djamena held the African U-21 Championships.

== Basketball in Chad ==
Basketball is a major sport in Chad, especially in the cities. In the last decade, its national team has become increasingly competitive and qualified for the 2011 African Basketball Championship.

== Rugby union in Chad ==
The Chad national rugby union team represents the nation in rugby union. Rugby is a minor sport in the country but is becoming increasingly popular.

== Chad at the Olympics ==
Chad (CHA) sent athletes to every Summer Olympic Games held between 1964 and 1972 and from 1984 to 2016, although the country has never won an Olympic medal. No athletes from Chad have competed in any Winter Olympic Games.
