= Mass media in Chad =

Mass media in Chad consists of privately owned newspapers, radio, TV stations, and online media outlets heavily regulated and controlled by the Government of Chad. Chad also has a public broadcaster controlled by the government. Although the law in Chad ensures freedom of the press, Reporters Without Borders says that in practice, the relationship between government and independent press outlets is strained.

== Radio ==
Radio is the most common non-internet medium for mass communication in Chad. International broadcasters such as the BBC World Service, Voice of America, Radio France Internationale, and Sahel Alliance/Radio Ndarason International have radio stations in the county. Radiodiffusion Nationale Tchadienne is the public broadcaster for Chad. It is the only radio network with nationwide reach due to governmental restrictions on broadcasting strength. A 2011 poll by pollster Intermedia found that 88% of Chadians had access to a radio. The same survey found that radio was the most trusted source of information in the country, followed by word of mouth.

Radio is largely funded by aid groups buying airtime from local stations.

=== List of radio stations ===
- Radio ADMC, in Abéché, FM 95.006
- Radio Arc-en-Ciel, in N'Djamena (est. 2005), FM 87.6; Catholic
- Radio Brakoss (est. 2000), in Moïssala, FM 98.105
- Dja FM, in N'Djamena (est. 1999), FM 96.91
- Radio Duji Lokar (est. 2001)and Radio Étoile de Matin, in Moundou (est. 2000), FM 101.83; Catholic
- Radio Effata, in Laï (est. 2005), FM 98.0; Catholic
- Radio FM Liberté, in N'Djamena (est. 2000) FM 105.31
- Radio Lotiko, in Sarh (est. 2001), FM 97.65; Catholic
- Radiodiffusion nationale tchadienne – RNT, in N'Djamena (est. 1955), FM 94.051
- Radio Oxygène, in N'Djamena (est. 2017), FM 96.3
- Radio Terre Nouvelle, in Bongor (est. 2000), FM 99.44; Catholic
- La Voix du Paysan, in Doba (est. 1996), FM 96.22; Catholic
- RF 1 Afrique

== Television ==
Over the years in Chad more and more privately owned television stations have been created. Before 2014 the one and only television station ONRTV (Tele Tchad), now called ONAMA, was state owned. In 2014 the first privately owned station was Electron TV, company which sparked the creation of new companies.

All stations broadcast a mix of French and Arabic programs except for Al Nassour TV and Al Nassour 24 TV, which only broadcasts in Arabic. Lale TV is a station that broadcasts drama and cultural shows in French and Arabic, Elecron TV (with 3 news sessions) is focused more on young people and music, Tchad 24 is the newest station in Chad broadcasting a variety of programs including news, and, finally, the state-owned Télé Tchad broadcasts from the ONAMA news tower in N'Djamena. ONAMA owns provincial stations in many cities around Chad including Mondo, Doba, Borkou, Mongo, and many more. As television becomes more popular in the country, privately owned television stations pop up more frequently.

=== List of television stations ===
Government-owned

- Onama (Tele Tchad)
- Onama Provincial Stations

Privately-owned

- Electron TV
- Al Nassour TV
- Al Nassour 24 TV
- Tchad 24 TV
- Lale Tc Tchad

Viewable in Chad

- Afrique Media

== Newspapers ==
=== List of newspapers ===
- Abba Garde
- Alwihda [fr]
- Cloche, monthly
- Da'kouna, monthly
- Info-Tchad, weekly[2]
- La Marche
- Le Messager du Moyen-Chari
- Le Miroir, bi-monthly
- N’Djamena al-Djadida
- N'Djamena Bi-Hebdo [fr], bi-weekly
- N'Djamena Hebdo, est. 1989; weekly
- Notre Temps, est. 2000; weekly
- L'Observateur, est. 1997; weekly
- Le Progrès, est. 1993; daily, government-subsidized
- RAFIGUI Presse Jeunes
- Sarh Tribune
- Sud Echos, weekly
- Tchad et Culture, est. 1961; monthly
- Le Temps, est. 1995; weekly

== Press freedom ==
Although freedom of the press is enshrined into Chad's constitution, in practice editorial independence is limited. At least three journalists have died in Chad since 2019.

Private ownership of media did not become more prevalent until the 1990s. As late as 1988, the government still had complete ownership of Chad's media ecosystem. Several international aid and press freedom organizations have written and published reports on restrictions in Chad. As early as 2002, Reporters Without Borders was reporting on restrictions in the county, when the then-government shut down a private radio station for broadcasting "information likely to disrupt public order."

== List of telecommunication companies ==
- Sotel Tchad
- TchadNet
- Bharti Airtel (Airtel Chad)
- Millicom (Tigo Chad)
- Tchad Mobile (Orascom)
- Sitcom.
- Salam Mobile
- Maroc Telecom.
- Tigo Airtel

== Bibliography ==
- "Chad: Directory: the Press". Africa South of the Sahara 2004. Regional Surveys of the World. Europa Publications. 2004. p. 236+. ISBN 1857431839. (Includes broadcasting)
- Toyin Falola; Daniel Jean-Jacques, eds. (2015). "Chad: Media". Africa: an Encyclopedia of Culture and Society. ABC-CLIO. ISBN 978-1-59884-666-9.
- "Chad", Freedom of the Press, USA: Freedom House, 2015, OCLC 57509361, archived from the original on 2017-06-22
