= List of mammals of Chad =

This is a list of the mammal species recorded in Chad. There are 136 mammal species in Chad, of which five are critically endangered, five are endangered, nine are vulnerable, and four are near threatened. One of the species listed for Chad can possibly no longer be found in the wild.

The following tags are used to highlight each species' conservation status as assessed by the International Union for Conservation of Nature:

EX	Extinct	No reasonable doubt that the last individual has died.
EW	Extinct in the wild	Known only to survive in captivity or as a naturalized populations well outside its previous range.
CR	Critically endangered	The species is in imminent risk of extinction in the wild.
EN	Endangered	The species is facing an extremely high risk of extinction in the wild.
VU	Vulnerable	The species is facing a high risk of extinction in the wild.
NT	Near threatened	The species does not meet any of the criteria that would categorise it as risking extinction but it is likely to do so in the future.
LC	Least concern	There are no current identifiable risks to the species.
DD	Data deficient	There is inadequate information to make an assessment of the risks to this species.

Some species were assessed using an earlier set of criteria. Species assessed using this system have the following instead of near threatened and least concern categories:

LR/cd	Lower risk/conservation dependent	Species which were the focus of conservation programmes and may have moved into a higher risk category if that programme was discontinued.
LR/nt	Lower risk/near threatened	Species which are close to being classified as vulnerable but are not the subject of conservation programmes.
LR/lc	Lower risk/least concern	Species for which there are no identifiable risks.

== Order: Afrosoricida (tenrecs and golden moles) ==
The order Afrosoricida contains the golden moles of southern Africa and the tenrecs of Madagascar and Africa, two families of small mammals that were traditionally part of the order Insectivora.

- Family: Tenrecidae (tenrecs)
  - Subfamily: Potamogalinae
    - Genus: Potamogale
      - Giant otter shrew, Potamogale velox LC

== Order: Tubulidentata (aardvarks) ==
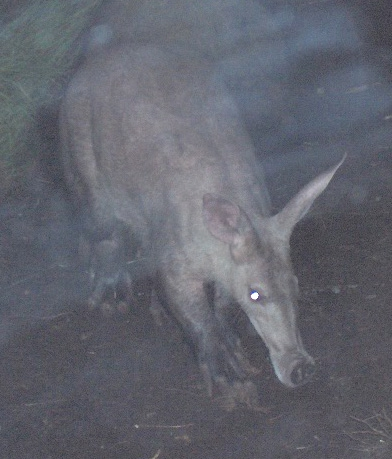
Aardvark

The order Tubulidentata consists of a single species, the aardvark. Tubulidentata are characterised by their teeth which lack a pulp cavity and form thin tubes which are continuously worn down and replaced.

- Family: Orycteropodidae
  - Genus: Orycteropus
    - Aardvark, O. afer LC

== Order: Hyracoidea (hyraxes) ==
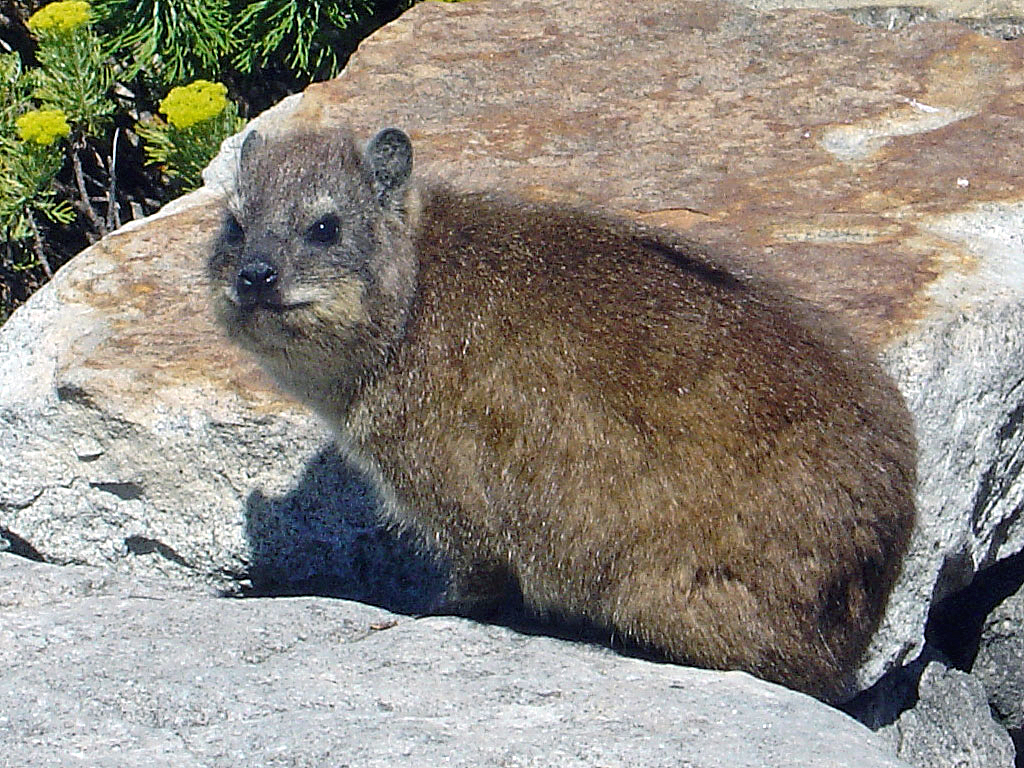
Cape hyrax

The hyraxes are any of four species of fairly small, thickset, herbivorous mammals in the order Hyracoidea. About the size of a domestic cat they are well-furred, with rounded bodies and a stumpy tail. They are native to Africa and the Middle East.

- Family: Procaviidae (hyraxes)
  - Genus: Procavia
    - Cape hyrax, Procavia capensis LC

== Order: Proboscidea (elephants) ==
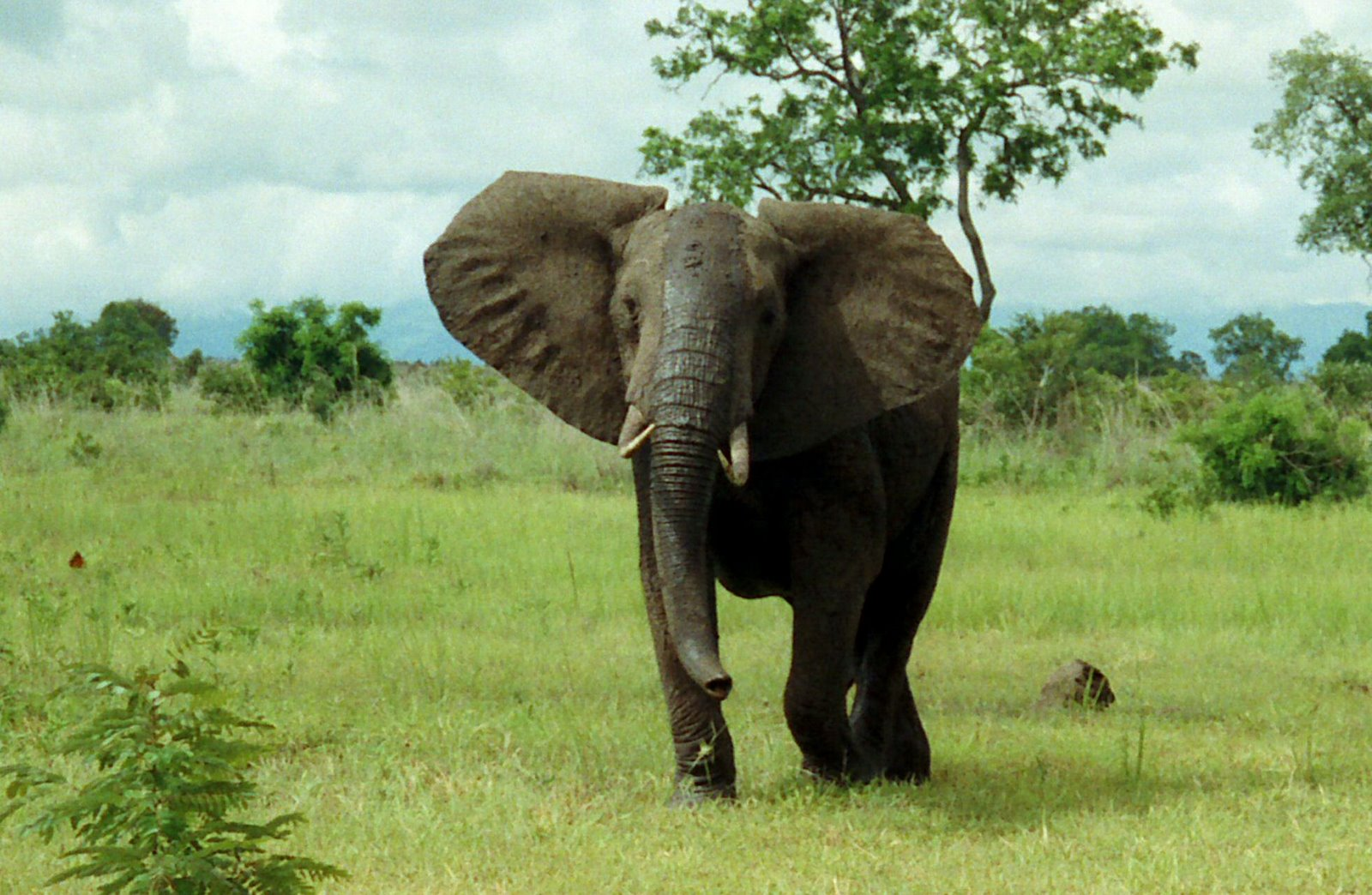
African bush elephant

The elephants comprise three living species and are the largest living land animals.

- Family: Elephantidae (elephants)
  - Genus: Loxodonta
    - African bush elephant, L. africana EN

== Order: Sirenia (manatees and dugongs) ==
Sirenia is an order of fully aquatic, herbivorous mammals that inhabit rivers, estuaries, coastal marine waters, swamps, and marine wetlands. All four species are endangered.

- Family: Trichechidae
  - Genus: Trichechus
    - African manatee, Trichechus senegalensis VU

== Order: Primates ==
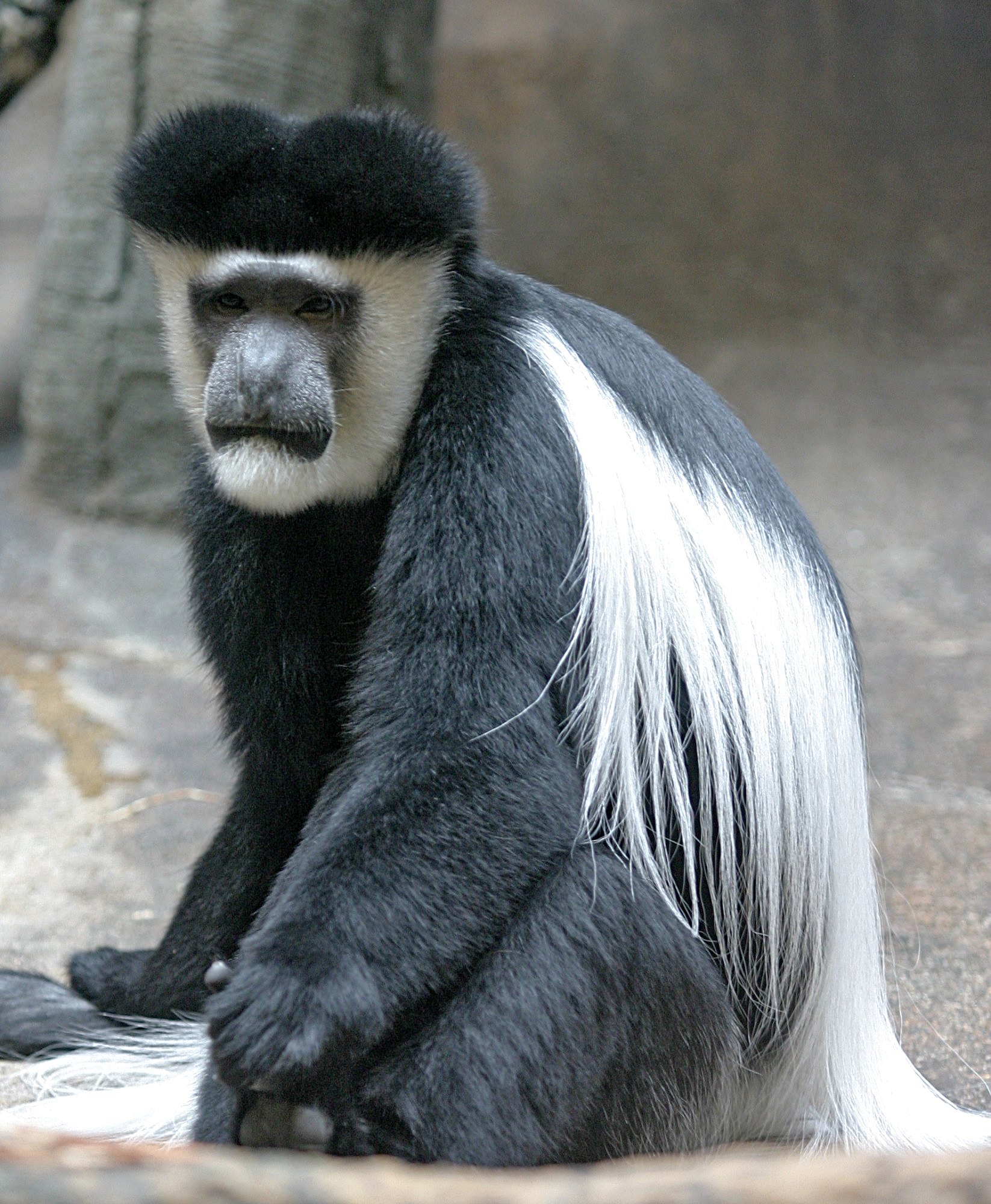
Mantled guereza

The order Primates contains humans and their closest relatives: lemurs, lorisoids, tarsiers, monkeys, and apes.

- Suborder: Strepsirrhini
  - Infraorder: Lemuriformes
    - Superfamily: Lorisoidea
      - Family: Galagidae
        - Genus: Galago
          - Senegal bushbaby, Galago senegalensis LR/lc
- Suborder: Haplorhini
  - Infraorder: Simiiformes
    - Parvorder: Catarrhini
      - Superfamily: Cercopithecoidea
        - Family: Cercopithecidae (Old World monkeys)
          - Genus: Erythrocebus
            - Patas monkey, Erythrocebus patas NT
          - Genus: Chlorocebus
            - Tantalus monkey, Chlorocebus tantalus LR/lc
          - Genus: Papio
            - Olive baboon, Papio anubis LR/lc
          - Subfamily: Colobinae
            - Genus: Colobus
              - Mantled guereza, Colobus guereza LR/lc

== Order: Rodentia (rodents) ==
Rodents make up the largest order of mammals, with over 40% of mammalian species. They have two incisors in the upper and lower jaw which grow continually and must be kept short by gnawing. Most rodents are small though the capybara can weigh up to 45 kg (99 lb).

- Suborder: Hystricognathi
  - Family: Hystricidae (Old World porcupines)
    - Genus: Hystrix
      - Crested porcupine, Hystrix cristata LC
  - Family: Thryonomyidae (cane rats)
    - Genus: Thryonomys
      - Lesser cane rat, Thryonomys gregorianus LC
- Suborder: Sciurognathi
  - Family: Sciuridae (squirrels)
    - Subfamily: Xerinae
      - Tribe: Xerini
        - Genus: Xerus
          - Striped ground squirrel, Xerus erythropus LC
      - Tribe: Protoxerini
        - Genus: Heliosciurus
          - Gambian sun squirrel, Heliosciurus gambianus LC
  - Family: Nesomyidae
    - Subfamily: Cricetomyinae
      - Genus: Cricetomys
        - Gambian pouched rat, Cricetomys gambianus LC
  - Family: Muridae (mice, rats, voles, gerbils, hamsters, etc.)
    - Subfamily: Deomyinae
      - Genus: Acomys
        - Western Saharan spiny mouse, Acomys airensis LC
        - Johan's spiny mouse, Acomys johannis LC
      - Genus: Uranomys
        - Rudd's mouse, Uranomys ruddi LC
    - Subfamily: Gerbillinae
      - Genus: Desmodilliscus
        - Pouched gerbil, Desmodilliscus braueri LC
      - Genus: Dipodillus
        - North African gerbil, Dipodillus campestris LC
      - Genus: Gerbillus
        - Agag gerbil, Gerbillus agag DD
        - Lesser Egyptian gerbil, Gerbillus gerbillus LC
        - Pygmy gerbil, Gerbillus henleyi LC
        - Sudan gerbil, Gerbillus nancillus DD
        - Balochistan gerbil, Gerbillus nanus LC
        - Nigerian gerbil, Gerbillus nigeriae LC
        - Greater Egyptian gerbil, Gerbillus pyramidum LC
        - Tarabul's gerbil, Gerbillus tarabuli LC
      - Genus: Tatera
        - Kemp's gerbil, Tatera kempi LC
        - Fringe-tailed gerbil, Tatera robusta LC
      - Genus: Taterillus
        - Congo gerbil, Taterillus congicus LC
        - Gracile tateril, Taterillus gracilis LC
    - Subfamily: Murinae
      - Genus: Arvicanthis
        - African grass rat, Arvicanthis niloticus LC
      - Genus: Lemniscomys
        - Typical striped grass mouse, Lemniscomys striatus LC
        - Heuglin's striped grass mouse, Lemniscomys zebra LC
      - Genus: Mastomys
        - Guinea multimammate mouse, Mastomys erythroleucus LC
        - Verheyen's multimammate mouse, Mastomys kollmannspergeri LC
        - Natal multimammate mouse, Mastomys natalensis LC
      - Genus: Praomys
        - Dalton's mouse, Praomys daltoni LC
  - Family: Ctenodactylidae
    - Genus: Massoutiera
      - Mzab gundi, Massoutiera mzabi LC

== Order: Lagomorpha (lagomorphs) ==
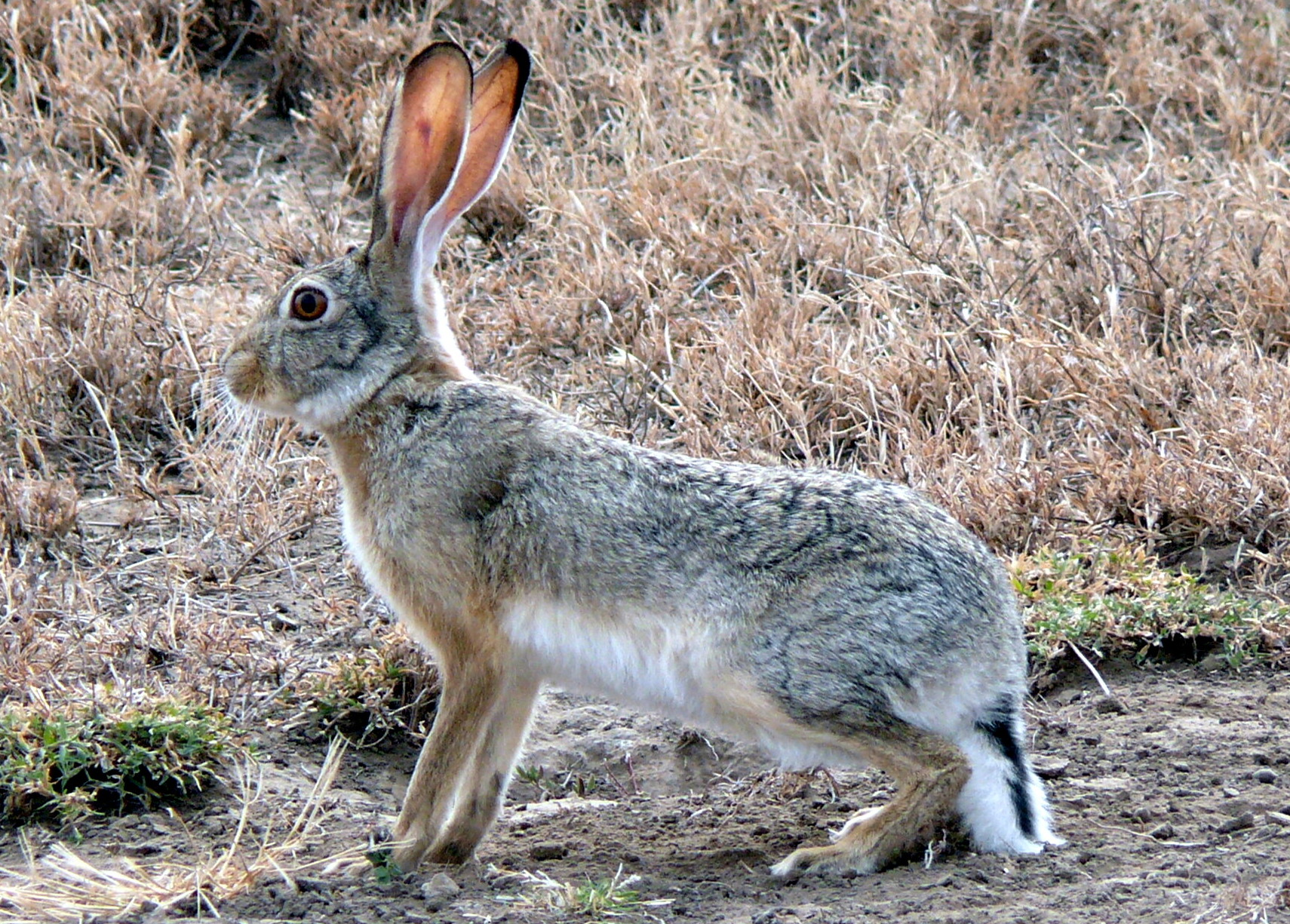
Cape hare

The lagomorphs comprise two families, Leporidae (hares and rabbits), and Ochotonidae (pikas). Though they can resemble rodents, and were classified as a superfamily in that order until the early 20th century, they have since been considered a separate order. They differ from rodents in a number of physical characteristics, such as having four incisors in the upper jaw rather than two.

- Family: Leporidae (rabbits, hares)
  - Genus: Poelagus
    - Bunyoro rabbit, Poelagus marjorita LC
  - Genus: Lepus
    - Cape hare, Lepus capensis LC
    - African savanna hare, Lepus microtis LC

== Order: Erinaceomorpha (hedgehogs and gymnures) ==
The order Erinaceomorpha contains a single family, Erinaceidae, which comprise the hedgehogs and gymnures. The hedgehogs are easily recognised by their spines while gymnures look more like large rats.

- Family: Erinaceidae (hedgehogs)
  - Subfamily: Erinaceinae
    - Genus: Atelerix
      - Four-toed hedgehog, Atelerix albiventris LC
    - Genus: Hemiechinus
      - Desert hedgehog, Hemiechinus aethiopicus LC

== Order: Soricomorpha (shrews, moles, and solenodons) ==
The "shrew-forms" are insectivorous mammals. The shrews and solenodons closely resemble mice while the moles are stout-bodied burrowers.

- Family: Soricidae (shrews)
  - Subfamily: Crocidurinae
    - Genus: Crocidura
      - Fox's shrew, Crocidura foxi LC
      - Savanna shrew, Crocidura fulvastra LC
      - Bicolored musk shrew, Crocidura fuscomurina LC
      - Small-footed shrew, Crocidura parvipes LC
      - Savanna path shrew, Crocidura viaria LC
      - Voi shrew, Crocidura voi LC
      - Yankari shrew, Crocidura yankariensis LC

== Order: Chiroptera (bats) ==
The bats' most distinguishing feature is that their forelimbs are developed as wings, making them the only mammals capable of flight. Bat species account for about 20% of all mammals.

- Family: Pteropodidae (flying foxes, Old World fruit bats)
  - Subfamily: Pteropodinae
    - Genus: Eidolon
      - Straw-coloured fruit bat, Eidolon helvum LC
    - Genus: Epomophorus
      - Gambian epauletted fruit bat, Epomophorus gambianus LC
      - Ethiopian epauletted fruit bat, Epomophorus labiatus LC
    - Genus: Micropteropus
      - Peters's dwarf epauletted fruit bat, Micropteropus pusillus LC
- Family: Vespertilionidae
  - Subfamily: Vespertilioninae
    - Genus: Glauconycteris
      - Butterfly bat, Glauconycteris variegata LC
    - Genus: Neoromicia
      - Tiny serotine, Neoromicia guineensis LC
      - Banana pipistrelle, Neoromicia nanus LC
      - Rendall's serotine, Neoromicia rendalli LC
      - Somali serotine, Neoromicia somalicus LC
    - Genus: Nycticeinops
      - Schlieffen's bat, Nycticeinops schlieffeni LC
    - Genus: Pipistrellus
      - Rüppell's pipistrelle, Pipistrellus rueppelli LC
      - Rusty pipistrelle, Pipistrellus rusticus LC
    - Genus: Scotoecus
      - Dark-winged lesser house bat, Scotoecus hirundo DD
    - Genus: Scotophilus
      - White-bellied yellow bat, Scotophilus leucogaster LC
      - Greenish yellow bat, Scotophilus viridis LC
- Family: Rhinopomatidae
  - Genus: Rhinopoma
    - Egyptian mouse-tailed bat, R. cystops LC
    - Lesser mouse-tailed bat, Rhinopoma hardwickei LC
    - Greater mouse-tailed bat, Rhinopoma microphyllum LC
- Family: Molossidae
  - Genus: Chaerephon
    - Gland-tailed free-tailed bat, Chaerephon bemmeleni LC
    - Nigerian free-tailed bat, Chaerephon nigeriae LC
    - Little free-tailed bat, Chaerephon pumila LC
  - Genus: Mops
    - Midas free-tailed bat, Mops midas LC
- Family: Emballonuridae
  - Genus: Taphozous
    - Hamilton's tomb bat, Taphozous hamiltoni DD
    - Mauritian tomb bat, Taphozous mauritianus LC
    - Naked-rumped tomb bat, Taphozous nudiventris LC
- Family: Nycteridae
  - Genus: Nycteris
    - Hairy slit-faced bat, Nycteris hispida LC
    - Large-eared slit-faced bat, Nycteris macrotis LC
    - Egyptian slit-faced bat, Nycteris thebaica LC
- Family: Megadermatidae
  - Genus: Lavia
    - Yellow-winged bat, Lavia frons LC
- Family: Rhinolophidae
  - Subfamily: Rhinolophinae
    - Genus: Rhinolophus
      - Rüppell's horseshoe bat, Rhinolophus fumigatus LC
  - Subfamily: Hipposiderinae
    - Genus: Asellia
      - Trident leaf-nosed bat, Asellia tridens LC
    - Genus: Hipposideros
      - Sundevall's roundleaf bat, Hipposideros caffer LC
      - Noack's roundleaf bat, Hipposideros ruber LC

== Order: Pholidota (pangolins) ==
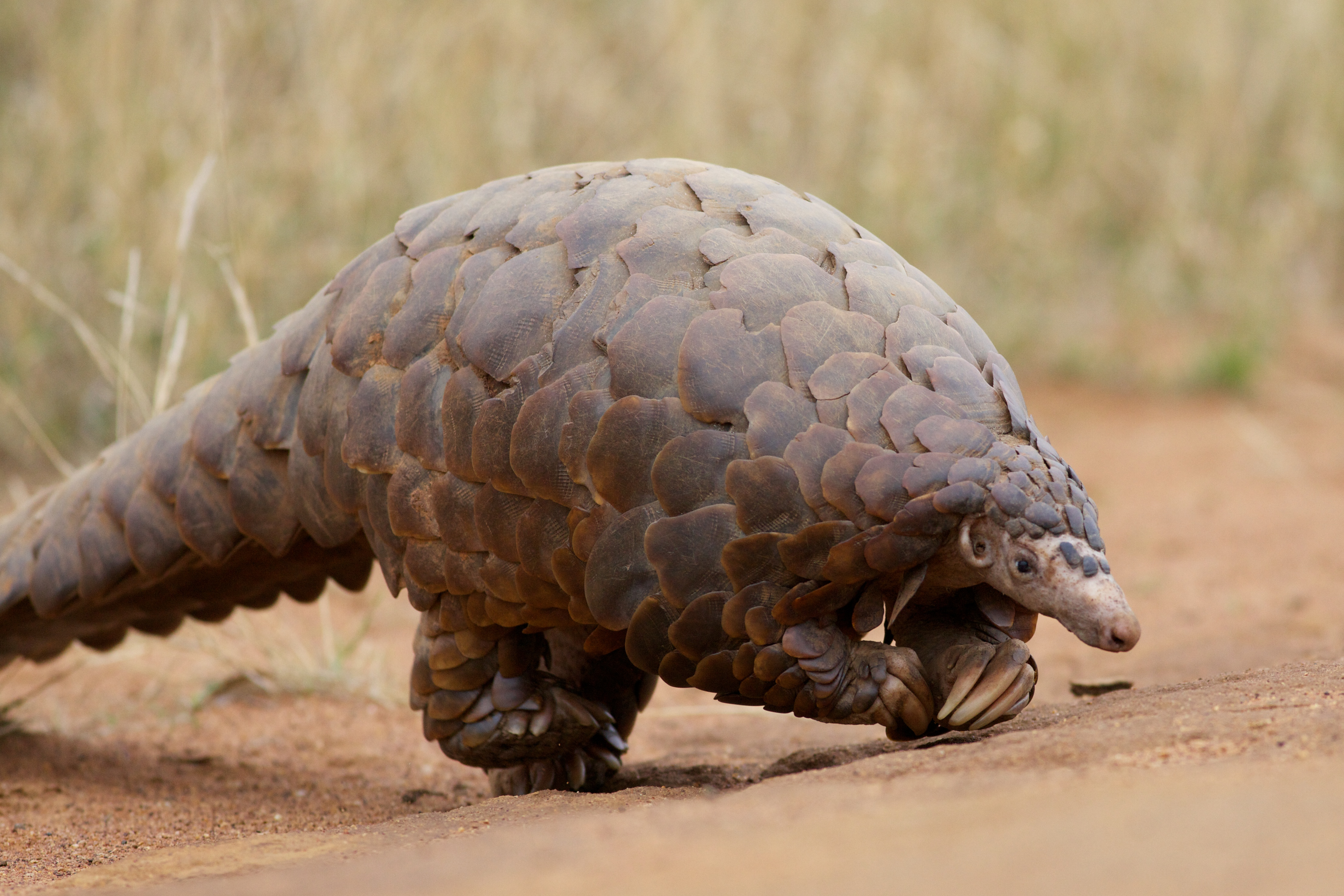
Ground pangolin

The order Pholidota comprises the eight species of pangolin. Pangolins are anteaters and have the powerful claws, elongated snout and long tongue seen in the other unrelated anteater species.

- Family: Manidae
  - Genus: Manis
    - Giant pangolin, Manis gigantea EN
    - Ground pangolin, Manis temminckii VU

== Order: Carnivora (carnivorans) ==
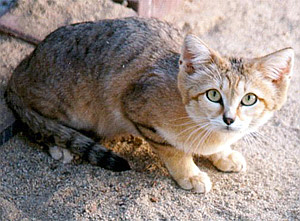
Sand cat

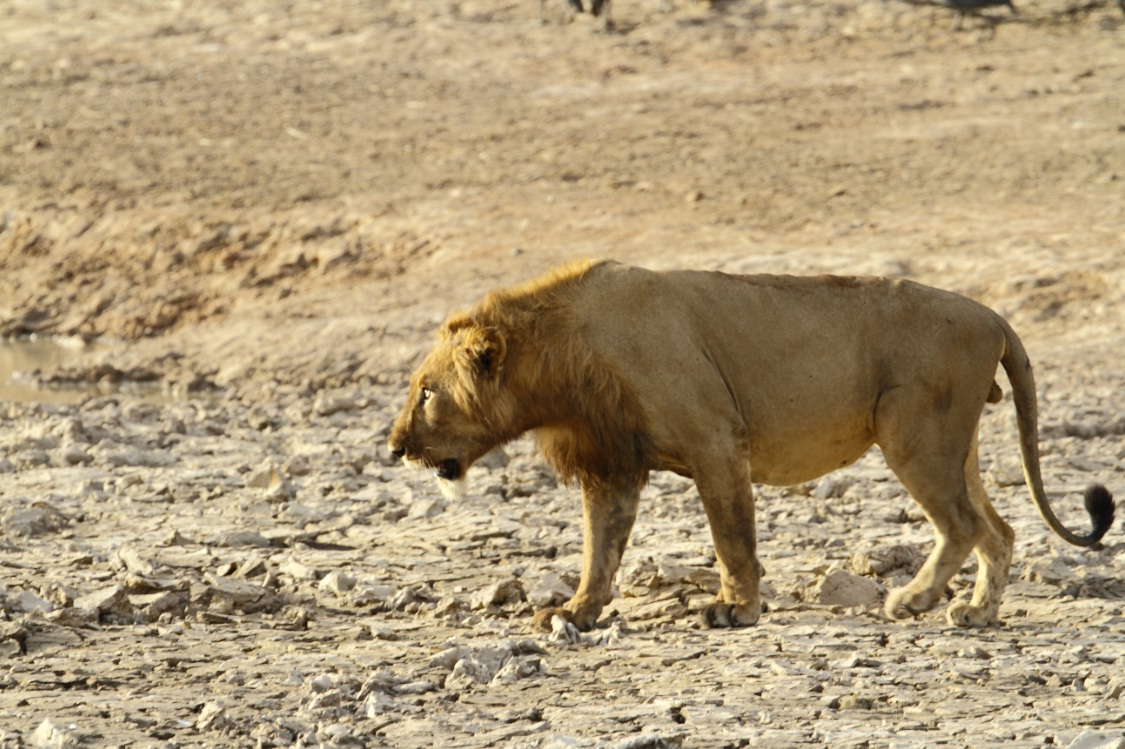
Lion

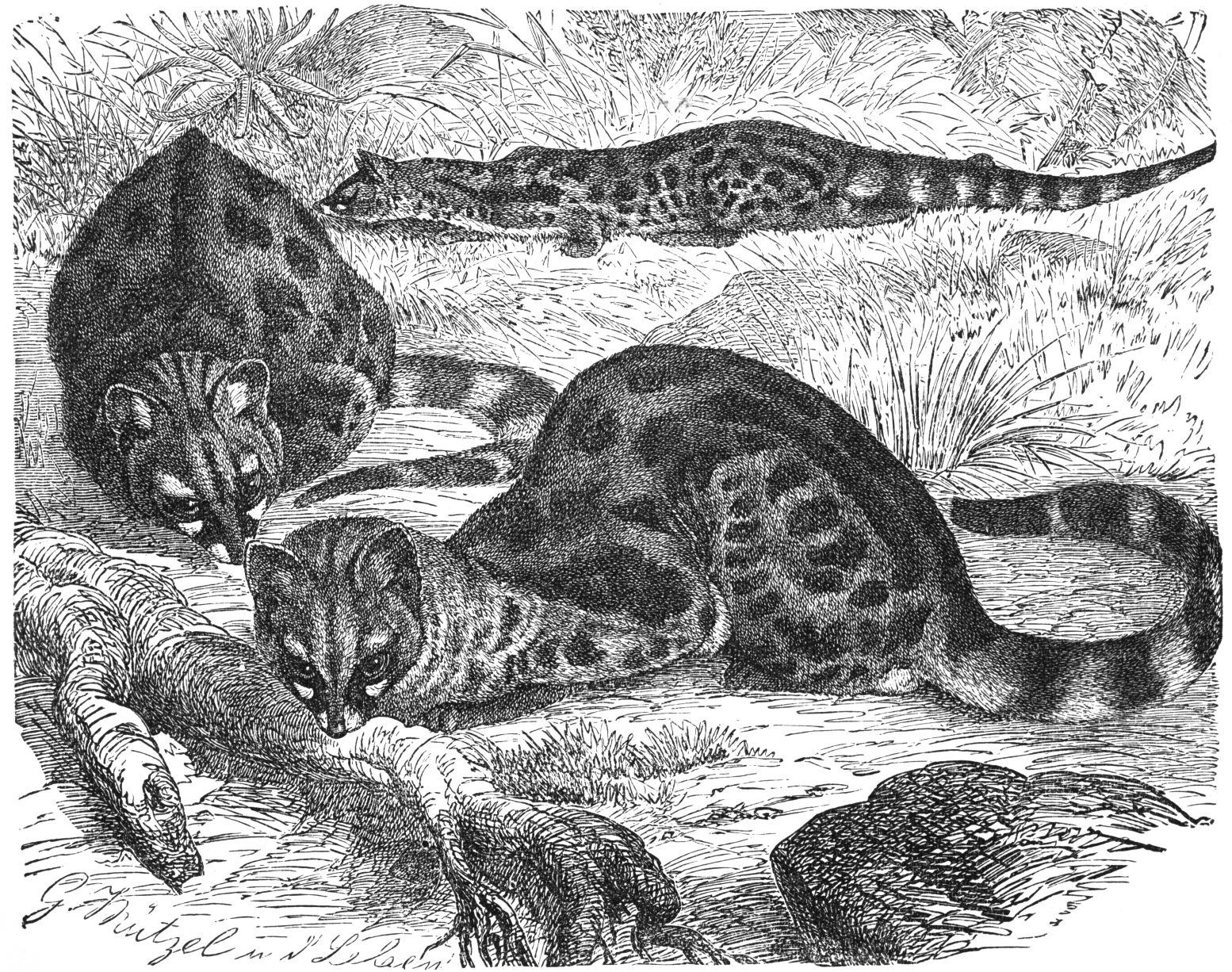
Common genet

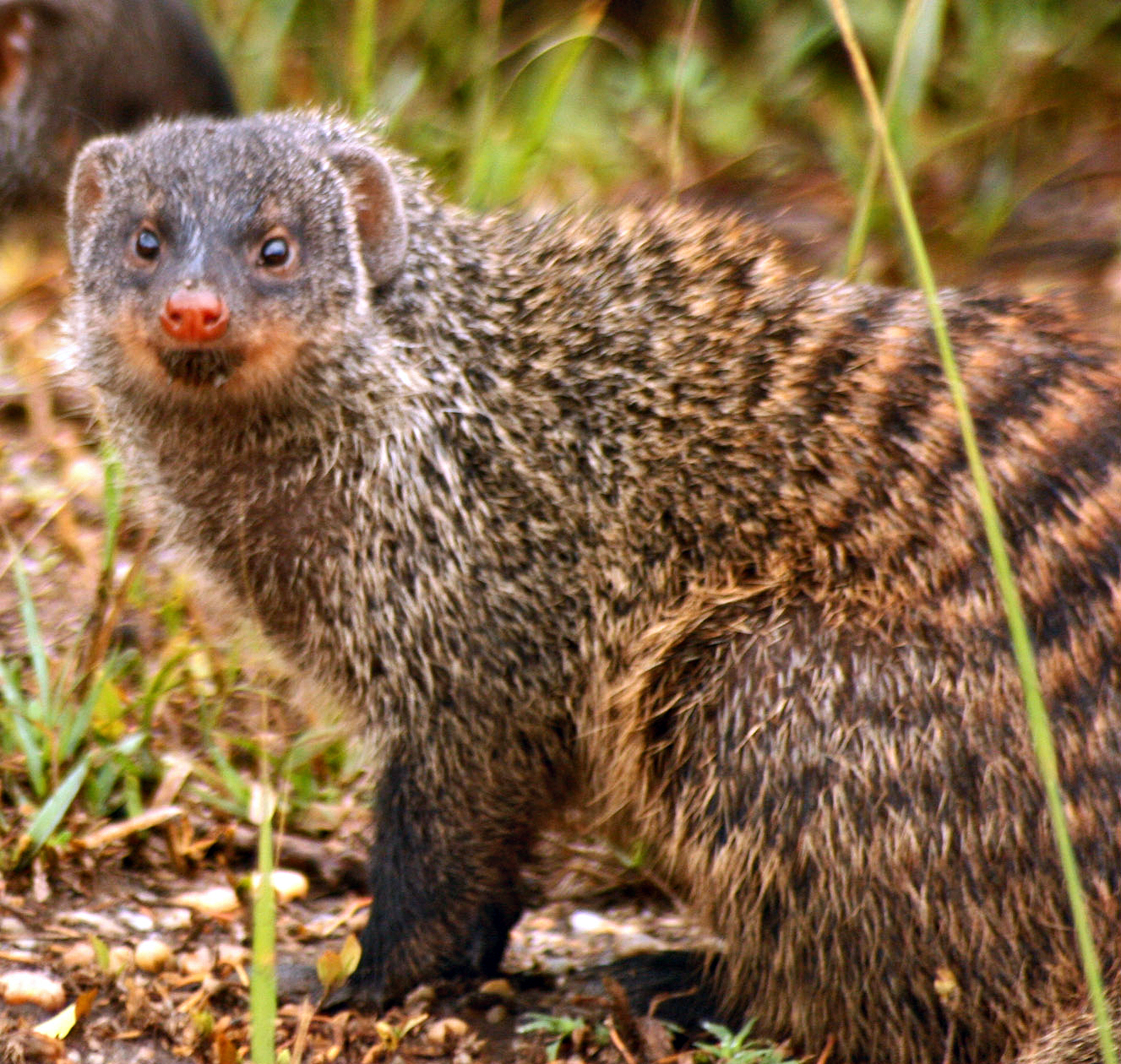
Banded mongoose

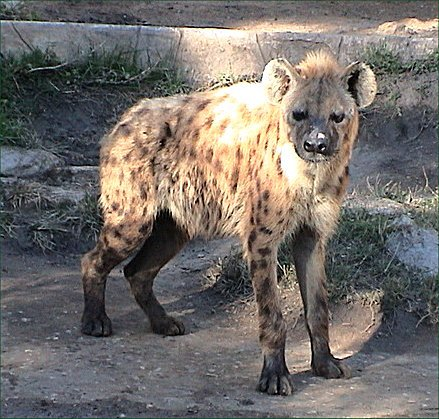
Spotted hyena

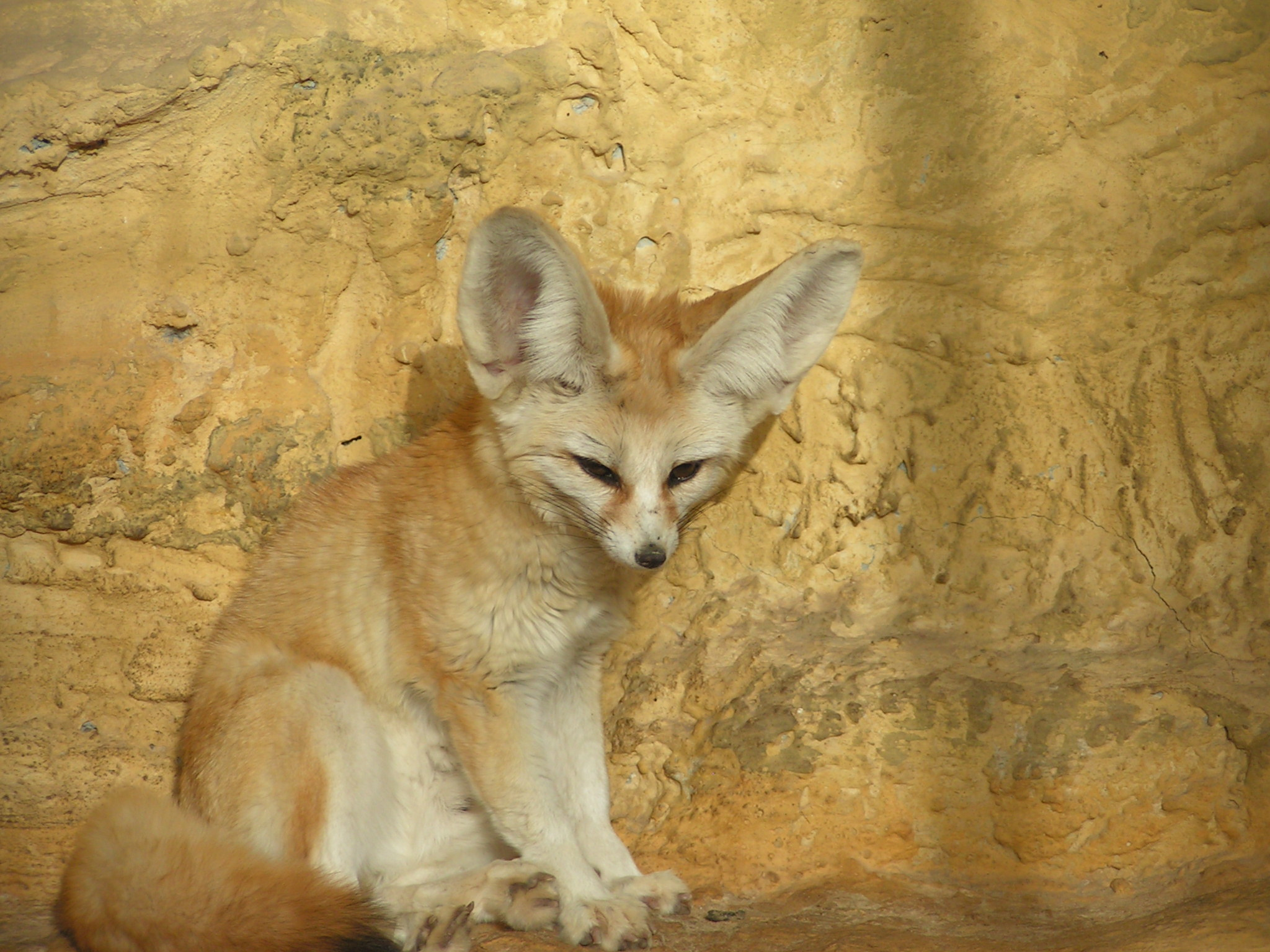
Fennec fox

There are over 260 species of carnivorans, the majority of which feed primarily on meat. They have a characteristic skull shape and dentition.

- Suborder: Feliformia
  - Family: Felidae (cats)
    - Subfamily: Felinae
      - Genus: Acinonyx
        - Cheetah, A. jubatus
          - Northwest African cheetah, A. j. hecki CR
      - Genus: Caracal
        - Caracal, C. caracal LC
      - Genus: Felis
        - African wildcat, F. lybica LC
        - Sand cat, F. margarita LC
      - Genus: Leptailurus
        - Serval, L. serval LC
    - Subfamily: Pantherinae
      - Genus: Panthera
        - Lion, P. leo VU
          - West African lion, P. l. leo CR
        - Leopard, P. pardus VU
  - Family: Viverridae
    - Subfamily: Viverrinae
      - Genus: Genetta
        - Common genet, G. genetta LC
        - Rusty-spotted genet, G. maculata LC
  - Family: Herpestidae (mongooses)
    - Genus: Herpestes
      - Egyptian mongoose, H. ichneumon LC
    - Genus: Mungos
      - Banded mongoose, M. mungo LC
  - Family: Hyaenidae (hyaenas)
    - Genus: Crocuta
      - Spotted hyena, C. crocuta LC
    - Genus: Hyaena
      - Striped hyena, H. hyaena LC
- Suborder: Caniformia
  - Family: Canidae (dogs, foxes)
    - Genus: Canis
      - African golden wolf, C. lupaster LC
    - Genus: Vulpes
      - Pale fox, V. pallida LC
      - Rüppell's fox, V. rueppellii LC
      - Fennec fox, V. zerda LC
    - Genus: Lupulella
      - Side-striped jackal, L. adusta LC
    - Genus: Lycaon
      - African wild dog, L. pictus EN
  - Family: Mustelidae (mustelids)
    - Genus: Ictonyx
      - Saharan striped polecat, Ictonyx libyca LC
      - Striped polecat, Ictonyx striatus LC
    - Genus: Mellivora
      - Honey badger, M. capensis LC
    - Genus: Hydrictis
      - Speckle-throated otter, H. maculicollis NT
    - Genus: Aonyx
      - African clawless otter, A. capensis NT

== Order: Artiodactyla (even-toed ungulates) ==
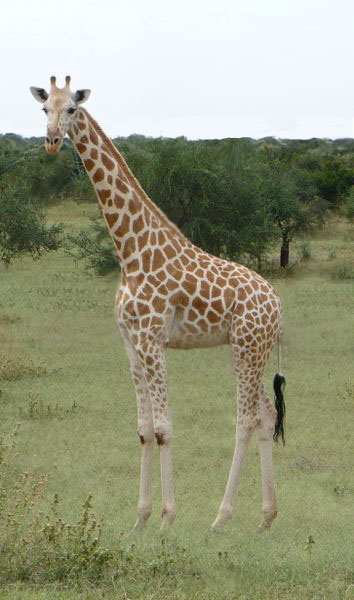
Northern giraffe

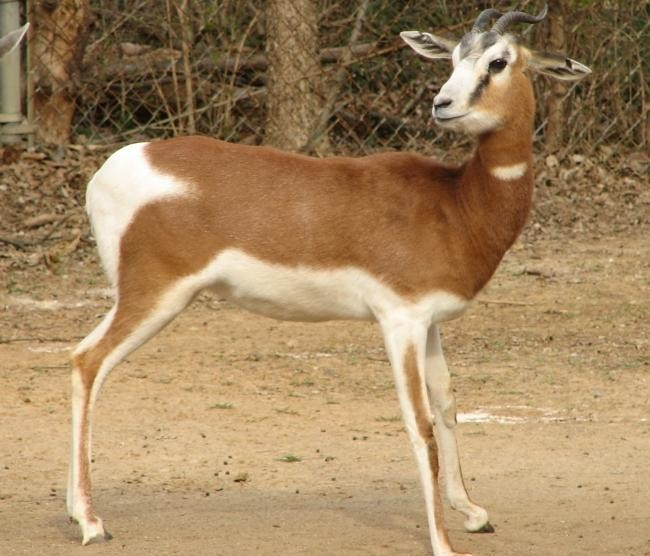
Dama gazelle

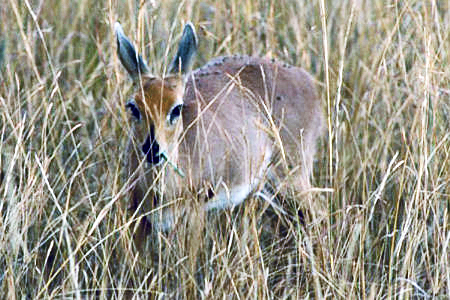
Oribi

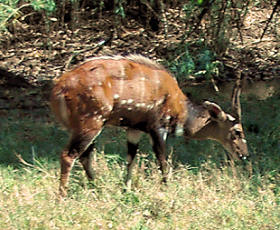
Bushbuck

The even-toed ungulates are ungulates whose weight is borne about equally by the third and fourth toes, rather than mostly or entirely by the third as in perissodactyls. There are about 220 artiodactyl species, including many that are of great economic importance to humans.

- Family: Suidae (pigs)
  - Subfamily: Phacochoerinae
    - Genus: Phacochoerus
      - Common warthog, Phacochoerus africanus LR/lc
  - Subfamily: Suinae
    - Genus: Potamochoerus
      - Red river hog, Potamochoerus porcus LR/lc
- Family: Hippopotamidae (hippopotamuses)
  - Genus: Hippopotamus
    - Hippopotamus, Hippopotamus amphibius VU
- Family: Giraffidae (giraffe, okapi)
  - Genus: Giraffa
    - Kordofan giraffe, Giraffa camelopardalis antiquorum CR
- Family: Bovidae (cattle, antelope, sheep, goats)
  - Subfamily: Alcelaphinae
    - Genus: Alcelaphus
      - Hartebeest, Alcelaphus buselaphus LR/cd
    - Genus: Damaliscus
      - Topi, Damaliscus lunatus LR/cd
  - Subfamily: Antilopinae
    - Genus: Gazella
      - Dorcas gazelle, Gazella dorcas VU
      - Rhim gazelle, Gazella leptoceros EN
      - Red-fronted gazelle, Gazella rufifrons VU
    - Genus: Nanger
      - Dama gazelle, Nanger dama CR
    - Genus: Ourebia
      - Oribi, Ourebia ourebi LR/cd
  - Subfamily: Bovinae
    - Genus: Syncerus
      - African buffalo, Syncerus caffer LR/cd
    - Genus: Tragelaphus
      - Giant eland, Tragelaphus derbianus VU
      - Bushbuck, Tragelaphus scriptus LC
      - Sitatunga, Tragelaphus spekii LC
      - Greater kudu, Tragelaphus strepsiceros LC
  - Subfamily: Caprinae
    - Genus: Ammotragus
      - Barbary sheep, Ammotragus lervia VU
  - Subfamily: Cephalophinae
    - Genus: Cephalophus
      - Red-flanked duiker, Cephalophus rufilatus LR/cd
      - Yellow-backed duiker, Cephalophus silvicultor NT
    - Genus: Sylvicapra
      - Common duiker, Sylvicapra grimmia LR/lc
  - Subfamily: Hippotraginae
    - Genus: Addax
      - Addax, Addax nasomaculatus CR
    - Genus: Hippotragus
      - Roan antelope, Hippotragus equinus LR/cd
    - Genus: Oryx
      - Scimitar oryx, Oryx dammah EN reintroduced
  - Subfamily: Reduncinae
    - Genus: Kobus
      - Waterbuck, Kobus ellipsiprymnus LC
      - Kob, Kobus kob LC
    - Genus: Redunca
      - Bohor reedbuck, Redunca redunca LC

== Globally and locally extinct ==
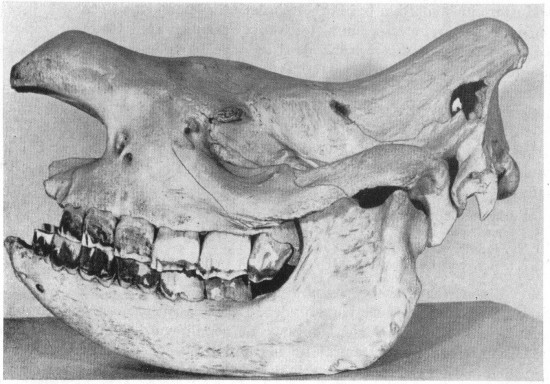
Skull of a western black rhinoceros

The following species are globally extinct:

- Western black rhinoceros, Diceros bicornis longipipes EX (2011)

The following species are locally extinct in Chad, but continue to live elsewhere or in captivity:

- Northern white rhinoceros, Ceratotherium simum cottoni EW ? CR

== See also ==
- List of chordate orders
- Lists of mammals by region
- List of prehistoric mammals
- Mammal classification
- List of mammals described in the 2000s
