= .td =

Internet country code top-level domain for Chad

- Introduced: 3 November 1997
- TLD type: Country code top-level domain
- Status: Active
- Registry: NIC.td (run by Agence de Développement des Technologies de l'Information et de la Communication)
- Sponsor: NIC.td and Agence de Développement des Technologies de l'Information et de la Communication
- Intended use: Entities connected with Chad
- Actual use: Some use in Chad; also gets some other use
- Registered domains: 876 (July 22, 2017)
- Registration restrictions: Generally none, local presence not required; other subdomains have varied restrictions
- Structure: Registrations are made directly at third level beneath second level domains
- Dispute policies: UDRP
- Registry website: Agence de Développement des Technologies de l'Information et de la Communication; Chadian Network Information Center - NIC.td

.td is the Internet country code top-level domain (ccTLD) for Chad (French: Tchad) made available for use in 1997.

It is administered by NIC.TD and Managed by Agence de Développement des Technologies de l'Information et de la Communication.

== Registrations ==
As of July 2017, there are 876 .td domains registered.

== Second-level domains ==
Registrations are made directly at the third-level beneath second-level domains:

- .presid.td (reserved for the Presidency)
- .gouv.td (reserved for government and state entities)
- .com.td (commercial companies including financial institutions, industrial, etc)
- .org.td (non-governmental organizations, nonprofit organizations, associations)
- .nat.td (public enterprises, national institutes, national offices, national agencies)
- .tourism.td (companies operating in the field of tourism, museums, national parks)
- .info.td (entities providing information and related content, such as the press, non-fiction television and radio)
- .net.td (telecommunications operators and networks)
- .sante.td (health establishments, such as hospitals, dispensaries, etc.)
- .edu.td (educational institutions)
- .agri.td (structure of the Ministry of Agriculture, research establishment)
- .ordr.td (professional orders)

== See also ==
- Internet in Chad
