= Tourism in Chad =

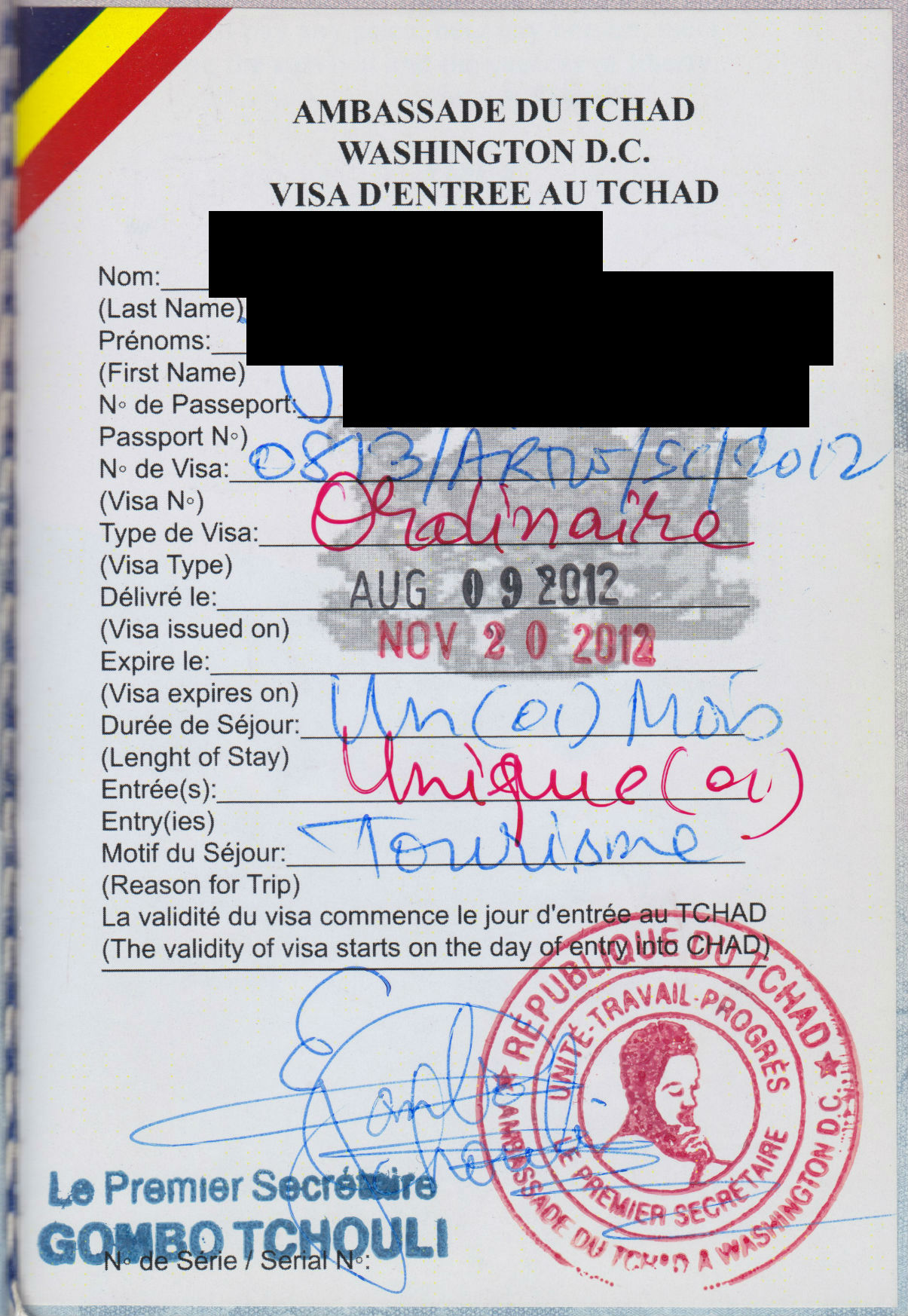
Chad tourism visa from 2012.

Tourism in Chad is a relatively minor industry. Most travellers are attracted by Chad's hunting capabilities and its Zakouma National Park.

Tourists must have valid passports and visas, as well as evidence of yellow fever immunization. As of 2000, there were roughly 43,000 tourist arrivals in the country. Chad had 677 hotel rooms with 1,250 beds in that year. The US Department of State estimated the average daily cost of staying in N'Djamena to be $239 in 2002, compared to less than $50 in other parts of the country.

== See also ==
- Visa policy of Chad
