= Military history of Chad =

The military history of Chad was closely tied to the French military during World War I and World War II, when many Chadians served in French forces.

Chad achieved independence in 1960 without national armed forces of its own. Following independence, Chad's armed forces were initially dominated by soldiers from southern ethnic groups, particularly the Sara, who had previously served in the French military. The army expanded during the 1960s and 1970s in response to insurgencies in northern and central Chad, although the military remained composed primarily of southern ethnic groups, particularly the Sara. During the civil conflicts of the 1970s and 1980s, the military was reorganized around northern-based forces under Hissène Habré, whose government fought rival and Libyan-backed factions.

Under Idriss Déby, the armed forces continued to be heavily influenced by northern ethnic groups while confronting rebellions and taking part in regional military operations. In the 21st century, Chad participated in regional campaigns against militant groups such as Boko Haram.

== Early years ==
During World War I, many Chadians, particularly members of the southern Sara ethnic group, had served in the French military. Chadian troops contributed significantly to the Free French Forces during World War II. Military service also brought economic benefits through wages, pensions, and Chad's role as a major Allied supply route to North Africa and Egypt.

Many Chadians remained in the French army after the war, often serving as noncommissioned officers and occasionally as commissioned officers. The wars in French Indochina and French Algeria further expanded the veteran population. Prior to independence, the French forces had been reorganized to redeploy some of the Chadian troops assigned to other African territories back into Chad. Veterans receiving military pensions often became part of the economic elite in southern Chad and generally did not participate in later insurgent movements in central and northern Chad.

Following independence, Chad's army was created by President François Tombalbaye on 27 May 1961 from southern troops that had served with the French army. Initially, the army was limited to 400 men, some Chadian officers and many French commissioned officers and NCOs. Other soldiers were transferred into a larger paramilitary security force, the National Gendarmerie. Equipped with light arms and other supplies, the army used facilities inherited from the French units that it had replaced.

Because the French army units in Chad provided security, a large indigenous force was unnecessary. Accordingly, the Chadian army was deliberately restricted in size. By 1966, however, the departure of the French administration from the sparsely populated Borkou-Ennedi-Tibesti Prefecture in the north encouraged dissident forces in the central prefectures to rebel. In response, the government expanded its armed strength to a 700-man infantry battalion with supporting light artillery and also activated an air unit.

The continued insurgency necessitated the further enlargement of the army, to a total of 3,800 men by 1971. The army formed a paratroop company from 350 Chadians trained by Israeli instructors at a base in Zaire. In addition to strengthening the regular army, the government increased mobile security companies of the National Gendarmerie, equipped as light infantry, to a strength of more than 1,600 men. A third force, the National Guard (later known as the National and Nomad Guard), which had at least 3,501 members, provided security for officials, government buildings, and regional government posts.

Except for the small number of nomad guards, the army and other security components continued to be composed primarily of members from southern ethnic groups, especially Sara. Little effort was made to enlist northerners, who, in spite of their reputation as fierce warriors, were not attracted to the professional army. Consequently, southern troops stationed in Borkou-Ennedi-Tibesti were looked upon as an army of occupation. They imposed humiliating restrictions in the northern settlements, and their abusive behavior was a source of bitterness.

== Military under Hissène Habré ==
The growing unpopularity of the country's first president, François Tombalbaye, impelled him to strengthen further the internal security forces and to employ a unit of Moroccan troops as his personal bodyguard. During the early 1970s, Tombalbaye doubled the size of the National and Nomad Guard and augmented the National Gendarmerie considerably. At the same time, he neglected and downgraded FAT, which the force interpreted as a lack of trust. These actions ultimately contributed to the decision by a small group of officers to carry out a coup in 1975 that resulted in Tombalbaye's death and a new government under Félix Malloum's presidency.

Malloum's military regime insisted on the departure of the French troops. FAT, however, found itself increasingly unable to cope with the insurgency in the north, and, as a consequence, Malloum was obliged to invite the French back in 1978. As part of an effort at conciliation with one of the rebel factions, Habré was brought into the government. Habré rejected, however, the plan to integrate his FAN troops into the army, and his force soon demonstrated its superior resolution and strength by expelling Malloum's army from N'Djamena.

By the late 1980s, Chad's national security establishment was a conglomeration of former rebel armies under the command of Habré, whose troops were mostly from the north. The evolution of the national security establishment from an army of mostly southerners was rapid. This change occurred between April 1975, when Malloum assumed power, and early 1979, when the combined northern forces of Habré and Goukouni drove the southern-dominated FAT from N'Djamena.

Internecine conflict in the late 1970s and early 1980s, however, prevented Chad from achieving political or military unity. Erstwhile comrades Habré and Goukouni became bitter adversaries, and, with Libyan backing, Goukouni evicted Habré from the capital in 1980. Although forced to flee, Habré had fought his way back to N'Djamena by mid-1982. His occupation of the city was followed by victories in the south against his divided opponents). With most regions of the country now under his authority, Habré assumed the presidency, promulgated a provisional constitution, the Fundamental Law of 1982, and introduced a cabinet and other institutions broadly representative of the existing political forces.

The Fundamental Law, which remained in effect as of 1988, declares that the president is the supreme commander of the army and is authorized to appoint high-ranking military officers, such appointments to be subject to implementing decrees approved by the Council of Ministers (presidential cabinet). Article 21 of the Fundamental Law states that "under the authority of the President of the Republic, the Chief of State, and the government, the national army has the task of defending the national independence and unity, sovereignty, territorial integrity, the security of the country, and its preservation from subversion and any aggression. The army participates in the work of national reconstruction.

Habré, who had personally commanded the major element of the northern forces during most of the Chadian Civil War, retained the title of supreme commander and a large measure of control over the military establishment. In addition to his positions as president and supreme commander, Habré had assumed the ministerial portfolio of national defense, veterans, and war victims. In a practical sense, however, in 1988 the Ministry of National Defense, Veterans, and War Victims was not a fully staffed government department independent of the military command structure.

At the head of the military chain of command in 1988 was Hassane Djamouss, the commander in chief of FANT and the battlefield commander during the succession of military victories over Libya. His senior deputy with responsibility for administration and logistics was Zamtato Ganebang. The second deputy, Adoum Yacoub, formerly commander of the People's Armed Forces (Forces Armées Populaires, FAP), a rebel army in the north, was responsible for tactics and operations. Another former rebel leader, Oki Dagache Yaya, was the senior representative of the FAP units that had been integrated into FANT.

The creation of a five-member military cabinet attached to the presidency, on which several of the ethnic groups composing FANT were represented, was one of the measures adopted by Habré to provide a governmental role for his former opponents. The extent to which Habré relied on its advice on matters of the military policy was not certain; some observers believe that Habré's former adversaries had been given symbolic positions having no real influence. The headquarters staff of FANT totaled about twenty officers and was composed of a number of bureaus patterned after those of the French military. Included were personnel (B-1), intelligence (B-2), operations (B-3), logistics (B-4), and communications (B-5). Other bureaus were tactics and recruitment. French advisers were detailed to all but the intelligence bureau.

The Presidential Guard (Sécurité Presidentielle, SP) was responsible for the personal security of the president and performed other internal security duties as well. Although the Presidential Guard participated in combat missions, it functioned as an independent wing of the armed forces. The Presidential Guard depended on FANT headquarters for administration and was officially part of FANT's structure, but it operated as a separate army, often in semisecrecy. Dominated by soldiers of Habré's ethnic group, the Daza, it enjoyed many privileges and was assigned the most modern transportation equipment and weaponry. In 1987 the 3,600-man force was commanded by Ahmed Gorou.

Except for the north, which had been organized into a separate military region, the country was divided into twelve military zones, each with headquarters in a major town. The senior officer, generally a major of the Presidential Guard, held command responsibility for any military units within his designated zone. Subzones were located in smaller communities, usually under a lieutenant.

== Military under Idriss Déby ==
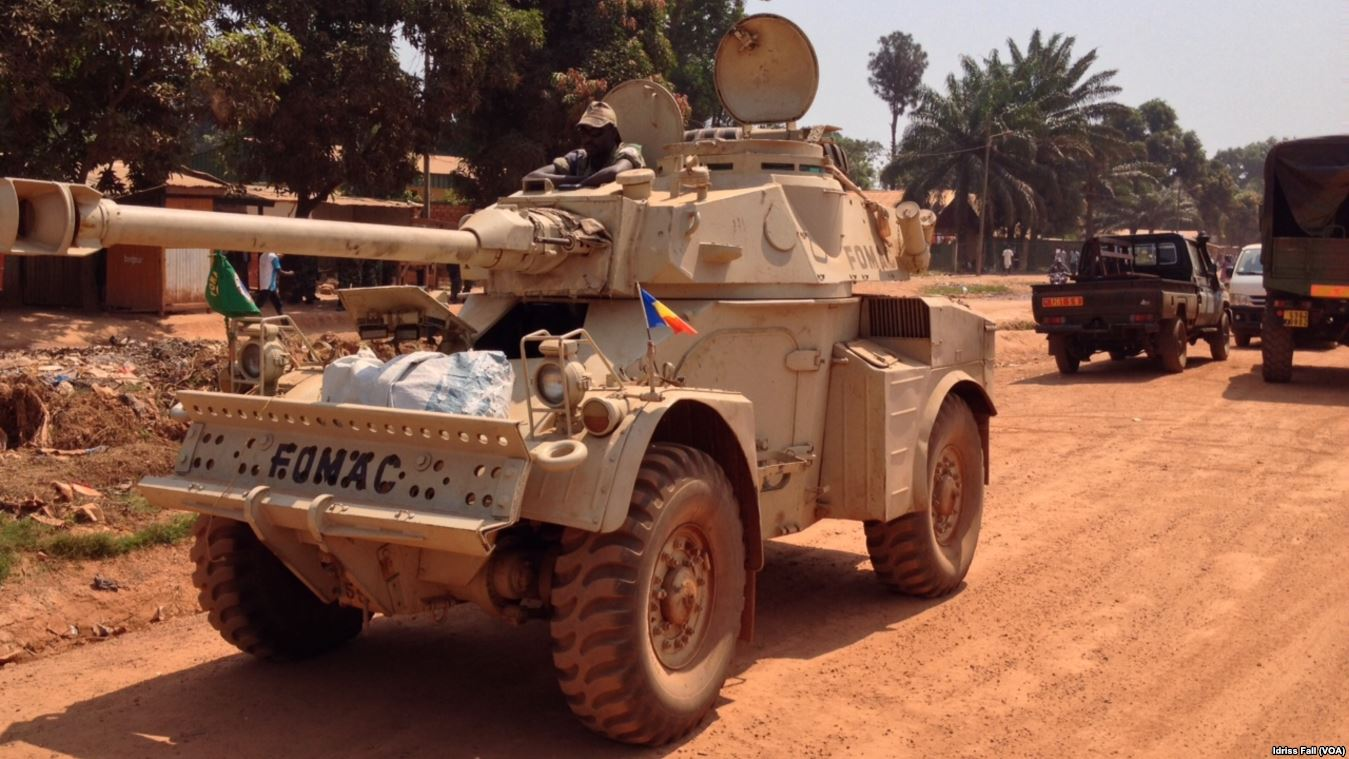
Eland 90 armoured car of the Chadian Army. President Déby purchased a number of these vehicles from a Belgian firm in 2008.

The Military of Chad was dominated by members of Toubou, Zaghawa, Kanembou, Hadjerai, and Massa ethnic groups during the presidency of Hissène Habré. Current Chadian president Idriss Déby, a member of the minority Zaghawa-related Bidyate clan and a top military commander, revolted and fled to Sudan, taking with him many Zaghawa and Hadjerai soldiers in 1989. The forces that Déby led into N'Djamena on December 1, 1990, to oust President Habré, was mainly Zaghawa, including a large number of Sudanese, many of whom were recruited while Déby was in the bush. Déby's coalition also included a small number of Hadjerais and southerners.

Chad's armed forces numbered about 36,000 at the end of the Habré regime, but swelled to an estimated 50,000 in the early days of Déby's rule. With French support, a reorganization of the armed forces was initiated early in 1991 with the goal of reducing the armed forces to 25,000. An essential element of this effort was to make the ethnic composition of the armed forces reflective of the country as a whole. Neither of these goals was achieved. The military still numbers at least 30,000 men and is dominated by the Zaghawa.

War and rebellion continue to plague Chad. Following Déby's rise to power, Habré loyalists continued to fight government troops and rob civilians around Lake Chad. There were numerous small rebellions in eastern Chad, even among the Zaghawa. In the mid- and late-1990s, a rebellion in the south by the FARF delayed the promised petrol development until it was crushed by government forces. Most recently, Youssouf Togoimi and his Movement for Democracy and Justice in Chad (MDJT) were the most serious threat to Déby's power. Since 1998, government and rebel forces have fought with little progress on either side. In January 2002, the government and the MDJT signed a formal peace accord.

In 2004, the government discovered that many of the soldiers it was paying did not exist and that some officers were taking these salaries for themselves; it furthermore determined that there were only about 19,000 soldiers in the army, as opposed to the 24,000 that had been previously believed. Government crackdowns against the practice are thought to have been a factor in a failed military mutiny in May 2004.

The Chad National Army dislodged Military Command Council for the Salvation of the Republic rebels from the town of Miski, near the border with Libya.

In 2003, Chad become an oil producer, and plans on how to spend oil revenues were created with the help of World Bank. According to this plan, 80% of revenues would go into development sectors such as education and healthcare, however money was diverted towards military spending from the beginning. Chad ripped the original plan after a civil war started, which allowed it to add "national security" in top priorities, most of this money went into the military. During the civil war Chad spent estimated 600 million dollars on buying new military equipment.

In 2013, Chad sent 2000 troops to join Operation Serval. Later in the same year Chad sent 850 soldiers to MISCA, those were withdrawn in April 2014 after alleged human rights abuses.

In January 2015, Chad started sending troops to its neighbors to help fight against Boko Haram.

On March 23, 2020, a Chadian army base was ambushed by fighters of the jihadist insurgent group Boko Haram. The army lost 92 servicemen in one day. In response, President Déby launched an operation dubbed "Wrath of Boma". According to Canadian counter terrorism St-Pierre, numerous external operations and rising insecurity in the neighboring countries had recently overstretched the capacities of the Chadian armed forces.

On 31 March 2020, Chad launched Operation Boma's Wrath against Boko Haram.

After the death of President Idriss Déby on 19 April 2021 in fighting with FACT rebels, his son General Mahamat Idriss Déby was named interim (and, later, permanent) president and head of the armed forces.
