= Geology of Chad =

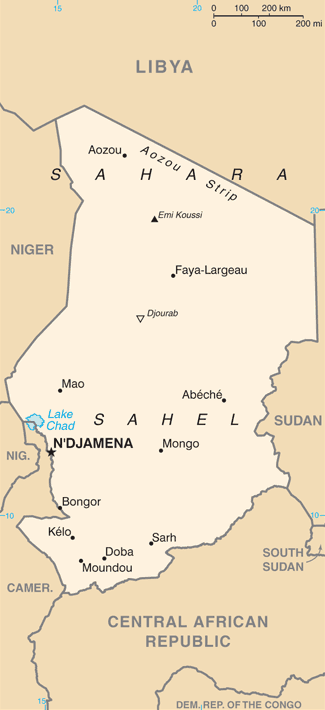
Map of Chad from the CIA World Factbook

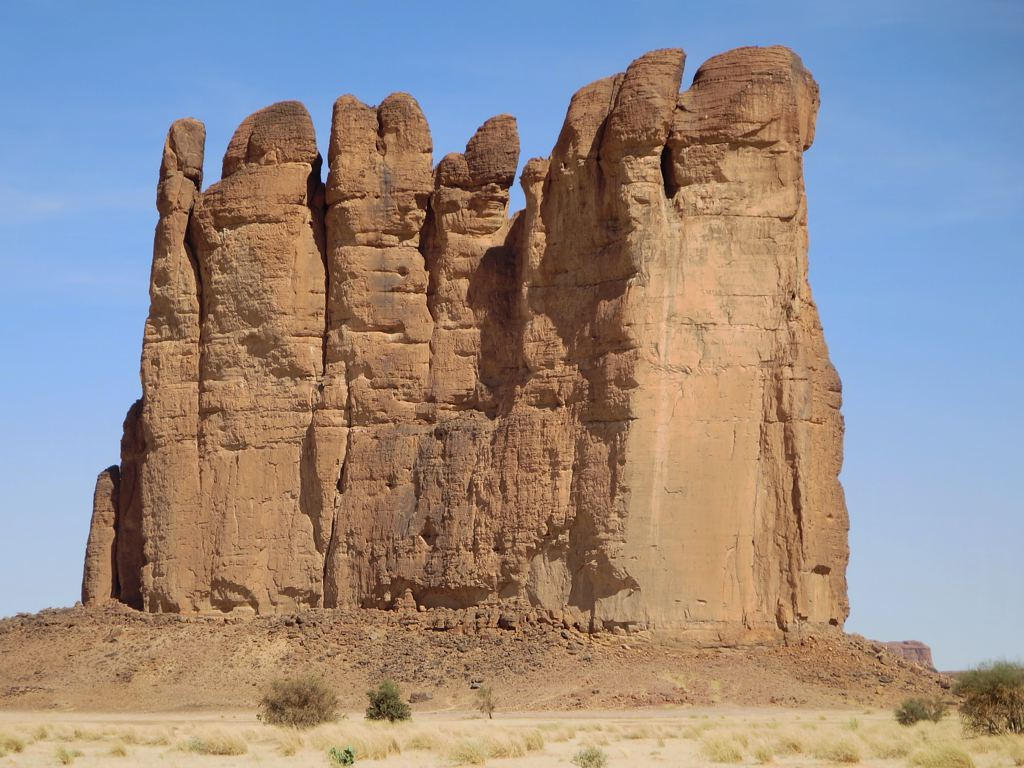
Sandstone pinnacles in northeastern Chad

The terrain of Chad in central Africa is dominated by the low-lying Chad Basin (elevation about 250m / 820ft), which rises gradually to mountains and plateaus on the north, east, and south.

In the east heights of more than 900 metres (3,000ft) are attained in the Ennedi and Ouaddaï plateaus. The greatest elevations are reached in the Tibesti Mountains in the north, with a maximum height of 3,415 metres (11,204ft) at Emi Koussi. The northern half of the republic lies in the Sahara. The Bodélé Depression is a low region in the southern Sahara that is surrounded by basalt mountain ridges. Winds flow through this region and lift dust. The dust from this region supplies over half of the dust to Amazon rainforests.

The only important rivers, the Logone and Chari, are located in the southwest and flow into Lake Chad. The lake doubles in size during the rainy season.

== Geology ==
The geology of Chad includes an area of metamorphic rocks of Precambrian age surrounding the Chad Basin which is floored with Tertiary and Quaternary sediments. There are Precambrian rocks in the Tibesti Mountains in the north and the east while in eastern Chad are basement rocks, some of which extend into Darfur in neighbouring Sudan.

Granitic gneiss and pelitic-graphitic schists are widespread. These are commonly cut by late orogenic granites and pegmatites. Within the Kufra Basin in the northeast are lower Palaeozoic sandstones which are overlain by Nubian Sandstones. There are also continental clastic rocks of lower Cretaceous age and rocks of marine origin from the Upper Cretaceous.

Within the Chad Basin, the Neogene Chad Formation is composed of lacustrine sediments.

== Economic geology ==
As of 2013, there is no significant mineral industry. Though gold, salt and soda ash have yet to be worked on any commercially significant basis, exploration for both crude oil and uranium has been undertaken by international companies.
