= Mining industry of Chad =

In the late 1980s, the only mineral exploited in Chad was sodium carbonate, or natron. Also called sal soda or washing soda, natron was used as a salt for medicinal purposes, as a preservative for hides, and as an ingredient in the traditional manufacture of soap; herders also fed it to their animals. Natron deposits were located around the shore of Lake Chad and the wadis of Kanem Prefecture, and near the oasis of Faya-Largeau.

Natron occurs naturally in two forms: white and black. More valuable commercially, hard blocks of black natron were exported to Nigeria. White natron was sold on local markets, principally in N'Djamena and farther to the south. Although efforts were made in the late 1960s to control the commercialization of natron through the creation of a parastatal, by 1970 those efforts had failed because of resistance by traditional chiefs and traders who controlled production through a system of perpetual indebtedness.

A number of other mineral deposits are known, but none had been commercially exploited by the mid-1980s. Bauxite is found in the Soudanian zone, and gold-bearing quartz is reported in Biltine Prefecture. Uranium is reported in the Aozou Strip, as are tin and tungsten in other parts of the Tibesti Mountains, but exploration reports in 1971 for these three minerals did not indicate large or rich deposits. As of 1987, conflicts in the region prevented further exploration.

By far the potentially most important resource is oil. In 1970, a consortium of Conoco, Shell, Chevron, and Exxon started exploration and in 1974 discovered minor oil deposits at Sédigi, near Rig Rig, to the north of Lake Chad. Total reserves at Sédigi were estimated at 60 million tons, or roughly 438 million barrels (69,600,000 m^{3}) of oil. Exploration in 1985 by the Exxon-led consortium discovered potentially large deposits near Doba in the southern region of Chad. Further efforts were suspended in 1986 when world oil prices continued to drop, although the consortium maintained a liaison office in N'Djamena in 1988.

Plans existed in the late 1970s to exploit the deposits at Sédigi and to construct a small refinery at N'Djamena. Those plans lapsed during the conflicts of the late 1970s and early 1980s but were revived in 1986 by the government with the support of the World Bank. The reasons for proceeding with plans to exploit these deposits and build a refinery were clear. The cost of importing petroleum products exceeded the cost of extracting and refining domestic crude, even when international oil prices were low. The plans, which anticipated operations to begin in the early 1990s, included well development in the Sédigi field, a pipeline to N'Djamena, a refinery with a 2,000- to 5,000 barrels per day (790 m^{3}/d) capacity, and the transformation or acquisition of power-generating equipment in the capital to burn the refinery's residual fuel oil. The refinery's output would satisfy 80 percent of Chad's annual fuel needs, including all gasoline, diesel, butane, and kerosene; lubricants and jet fuel, however, would still have to be imported.
