= List of airports in Chad =

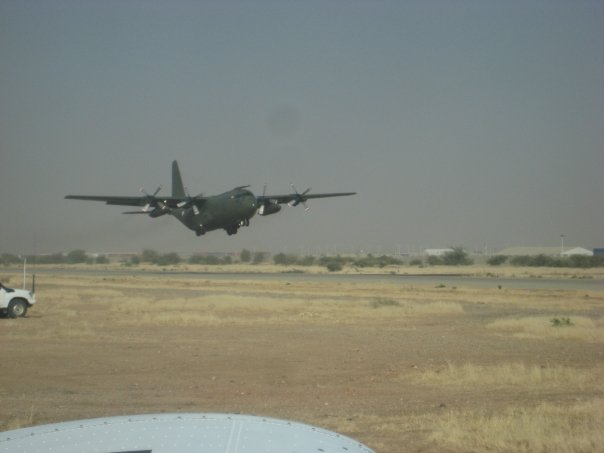
An airplane landing in Abéché

This is a list of airports in Chad, grouped by type and sorted by location.

Chad, officially known as the Republic of Chad (French: République du Tchad, Arabic: جمهورية تشاد or Jumhūriyyat Tshād), is a landlocked country in Central Africa. It is bordered by Libya to the north, Sudan to the east, the Central African Republic to the south, Cameroon and Nigeria to the southwest, and Niger to the west. The country is divided into 22 regions, which are further divided into departments and Sub-prefectures.

Chad's capital and largest city is N'Djamena, which is the location of the country's only airport with scheduled passenger service.

== Airports ==
Airport names shown in bold indicate the airport has scheduled service on commercial airlines.

City served	Region	ICAO	IATA	Airport name	Coordinates	El.(m)	RWY	Len.(m)	Surface
**Public airports** (some may be joint public/military use)
Abéché	Ouaddaï	FTTC	AEH	Abéché Airport	14°40′50″N 020°50′56″E	545	09/27	2,800	asphalt
Abou-Deïa	Salamat		AOD	Abou-Deïa Airport	11°28′N 019°17′E	480	11/29	1,400	clay
Adé	Sila			Adé Airport	12°40′N 021°55′E	631	09/27	1,050	clay / gravel
Adré	Ouaddaï			Adré Airport	13°28′51″N 022°10′43″E	787	07/25	1,300	clay / sand
Am-Dam	Sila			Am-Dam Airport	12°44′N 020°30′E	450	08/26	1,200	clay
Am-Timan	Salamat	FTTN	AMC	Am-Timan Airport	11°02′06″N 020°16′29″E	433	03/21	1,500	brick
Amdjarass	Ennedi-Est	FTAA		Amdjarass Airport	15°58′42″N 022°46′22″E	912	09/27	3,050	asphalt
Ati	Batha	FTTI	ATV	Ati Airport	13°14′22″N 018°18′47″E	332	09/27	1,300	brick / sand
Ba Ili	Chari-Baguirmi			Ba Ili Airport	10°30′56.1″N 016°27′31.8″E	295	03/21	951	grass
Baïbokoum	Logone Oriental			Baïbokoum Airport	07°45′55″N 015°42′13″E	466	15/33	600	laterite
Beguelkar	Logone Oriental			Beguelkar Airport	08°3′25.8″N 016°9′40.4″E	590	10/28	905	grass
Biltine	Wadi Fira	FTTE		Biltine Airport	14°31′24″N 20°54′37″E	512	09/27	1,250	clay
Bokoro	Hadjer-Lamis	FTTK	BKR	Bokoro Airport	12°23′07″N 017°04′15″E	300	09/27	1,145	laterite / brick
Bol	Lac	FTTL	OTC	Bol-Bérim Airport	13°26′36″N 014°44′21″E	291	05/23	800	macadam
Bongor	Mayo-Kebbi Est	FTTB	OGR	Bongor Airport	10°17′17″N 015°22′48″E	328	09/27	1,600	rolled
Bousso	Chari-Baguirmi	FTTS	OUT	Bousso Airport	10°29′29″N 016°43′13″E	335	03/21	1,200	brick
Daguessa	Sila			Daguessa Airport	12°02′N 022°25′E	555	13/31	1,240	dirt
Dildo	Logone Oriental			Dildo Airport	08°31′48.6″N 016°49′4.1″E	411	04/22	1,999	asphalt
Djédaa	Batha			Djédaa Airport	13°33′N 018°36′E	330	09/27; 14/32	1,150; 690	dirt dirt
Djiour	Tandjilé			Djiour Southwest Airport	09°58′43.7″N 016°39′55.4″E	330	08/26	933	grass
Doba	Logone Oriental			Doba Airport	08°42′02″N 016°50′03″E	387	03/21	1,200	laterite
Fada	Ennedi	FTTF		Fada Airport	17°11′18″N 021°30′42″E	563	12/30	1,800	laterite
Faya-Largeau	Borkou	FTTY	FYT	Faya-Largeau Airport	17°54′58″N 019°06′32″E	235	06/24	2,800	macadam
Fianga	Mayo-Kebbi Est			Fianga Airport	09°55′21″N 015°07′06″E	324	07/25	600	laterite / clay / sand
Gounou-Gaya	Mayo-Kebbi Est			Gounou-Gaya Airport	09°38′15″N 015°30′18″E	345	05/23	875	sand
Goz-Beïda	Sila	FTTG		Goz-Beïda Airport	12°12′42″N 021°27′30″E	538	17/35	1,400	clay
Guéréda	Wadi Fira			Guéréda Airport	14°30′N 022°05′E	988	08/26	1,050	clay / sand
Haraze	Salamat			Haraze Airport	09°56′N 020°54′E	414	01/19	1,360	clay
Iriba	Wadi Fira			Iriba Airport	15°08′02″N 022°13′16″E	946	09/27	1,340	clay
Kélo	Tandjilé			Kélo Airport	09°18′50″N 015°47′11″E	378	05/23	800	laterite
Koro-Toro	Borkou			Koro-Toro Airport	16°03′N 018°29′E	243	04/22	1,000	clay / sand
Koukou Angarana	Sila			Koukou Angarana Airport	12°00′27″N 021°40′24″E	512	04/22	1,350	gravel
Koumra	Mandoul			Koumra Airport	08°55′45″N 017°34′55″E	430	07/25	750	laterite / sand
Kyabé	Moyen-Chari			Kyabé Airport	09°26′50″N 018°55′40″E	410	09/27	600	laterite
Laï	Tandjilé	FTTH	LTC	Laï Airport	09°23′53″N 016°18′45″E	357	05/23	800	laterite
Léré	Mayo-Kebbi Ouest			Léré Airport	09°38′44″N 014°10′23″E	240	05/23	800	laterite
Mao	Kanem	FTTU	AMO	Mao Airport	14°08′46″N 015°18′51″E	327	07/25	1,100	brick
Massenya	Chari-Baguirmi			Massenya Airport	11°25′N 016°09′E	325	10/28	1,100	clay / sand
Melfi	Guéra		MEF	Melfi Airport	11°03′N 017°57′E	394	11/29	1,200	clay / sand
Moïssala	Mandoul			Moïssala Airport	08°20′N 017°46′E	382	02/20	600	laterite / sand
Mongo	Guéra	FTTM	MVO	Mongo Airport	12°10′12″N 018°40′31″E	431	06/24	1,800	clay / sand
Moundou	Logone Occidental	FTTD	MQQ	Moundou Airport	08°37′13″N 016°04′06″E	429	04/22	3,000	asphalt
Moussoro	Bahr el Gazel		MXR	Moussoro Airport	13°39′N 016°30′E	300	03/21	1,200	clay / sand
Moyto	Hadjer-Lamis			Moyto Airport	12°35′N 016°32′E	270	11/29	1,400	dirt
N'Djamena	N'Djamena	FTTJ	NDJ	**N'Djamena International Airport**	12°07′30″N 015°01′29″E	295	05/23; 05/23	2,800; 1,500	asphalt concrete clay
N'Gouri	Lac			N'Gouri Airport	13°38′N 015°21′E	280	07/25	650	natron
Naramay	Chari-Baguirmi			Naramay East Airport	10°11′54.9″N 016°52′5.6″E	324	04/22	1,036	grass
Oum-Hadjer	Batha		OUM	Oum-Hadjer Airport	13°16′N 019°43′E	391	03/21	1,100	clay
Ounianga	Ennedi			Kébir Airport	18°58′N 020°30′E	418	04/22	1,320	sand
Pala	Mayo-Kebbi Ouest	FTTP	PLF	Pala Airport	09°22′47″N 014°55′32″E	467	05/23	1,600	laterite
Salal	Bahr el Gazel			Salal Airport	14°51′N 017°13′E	300	04/22	600	clay
Sarh	Moyen-Chari	FTTA	SRH	Sarh Airport	09°09′04″N 018°22′46″E	365	09/27	1,800	laterite
Tari	Chari-Baguirmi			Tari West Airport	10°1′57.3″N 017°16′44.5″E	329	03/21	1,024	grass
Tchagen	Tandjilé			Tchagen Airport	10°2′21.9″N 016°18′57.4″E	334	16/34	823	grass
Zakouma	Salamat		AKM	Zakouma Airport	10°53′27″N 019°49′03″E	415	03/21	1,500	clay
Zouar	Tibesti	FTTR		Zouar Airport	20°26′55″N 016°34′16″E	809	13/31	1,450	gravel
**Military airports**
Bardaï	Tibesti	FTTZ		Bardaï-Zougra Airport (military)	21°26′57″N 017°03′21″E	1,074	07/25	1,800	sand / gravel

== See also ==
- Transport in Chad
- Chadian Air Force
- List of airports by ICAO code: F#FT - Chad
- Wikipedia: WikiProject Aviation/Airline destination lists: Africa#Chad
