= Bahr el Gazel Department =

Former department of Kanem Region, Chad

Coordinates: 13°38′N 16°29′E

Bahr el Gazel (Arabic: بحر الغزال, French: Barh El Gazel) was formerly a department in the Kanem Region of Chad.

In 2008 the former department was split from Kanem to become a new region of the same name.

The capital of the former department and new region is Moussoro.

== Sub-divisions ==
The department was divided into six sub-prefectures:

- Amsileb
- Chadra
- Mandjoura
- Michemire
- Moussoro
- Salal
- Toumia
- Islet
- Mandjoura

== See also ==
- Departments of Chad
