= Petroleum industry in Chad =

A 2019 treemap of Chad's exports indicating the bulk of the country's exports are oil-related

Chad maintains sizable reserves of crude oil which, alongside agriculture, makes up the largest share of the landlocked former French colony's export revenue. Producing around 100,000 barrels of oil a day, most of Chad's crude comes from its reserves in the Doba Basin in southern Chad where oil was discovered in the early 1970s by foreign drillers. There is an estimated one billion barrels of oil in Chad, most of it being exploited by hundreds of rigs operated by Western companies such as ExxonMobil and Shell. However, many challenges exist to Chad's petroleum industry including but not limited to corruption, internal conflict, and geography. Since Chad is landlocked, most of Chad's oil exports are transported out of the country by a pipeline that leads to the Cameroonian port city of Kribi. This pipeline, owned by a consortium, has come under fire due to allegations of exploitation by international corruption watchdogs, and Chadian politicians. In addition, environmentalists have voiced their concerns over the pipeline's impact on the natural environment, citing several spills.

== Background ==
=== Early exploitation ===
Oil exploration in Chad began in the 1950s while the country was still under French colonial administration. At least three oil rich areas were discovered in the country, however due to the high cost that would have been incurred in exploiting the finds, the French opted not to develop them. At the time the bulk of France's petroleum was being imported from Algeria and the Middle East. In 1960, Chad achieved its independence from France, and François Tombalbaye took over the country as its first president. Tombalbaye enlisted Conoco, an American oil and gas company to search for oil reserves. The company found oil in several areas in 1973-1975, notably the Doba Basin in the Central African Rift system, and the Sedigui area of Lake Chad. In 1975, Tombalbaye was killed by soldiers in a coup d'état and he was replaced with a military junta. This further intensified an already ongoing civil war between the government led by Goukouni Oueddei who became head of state of Chad in 1979, and Hissène Habré, the French and U.S.-backed former defense minister. During this period of especially heavy fighting, Conoco and other foreign oil companies suspended their oil exploitation efforts and left the country. Throughout the 1980s, very little was done to cultivate the petroleum industry owing to political instability, internal conflict, and the Chadian–Libyan conflict.

=== Déby era ===
In 1990, Idriss Déby came to power in a coup changing the dynamics of oil and power in the country. Despite relative increases in stability and a reduction in conflict, rebellion and violence was still rife. British oil company, Shell, and French oil company, Total (then known as Elf Aquitaine) withdrew from Chad in 1999. Elf's withdrawal drew criticism from the Déby government and the government organized demonstrations against the move which saw protesters burn the French flag. In 2000, a new oil consortium emerged, which included Exxon (operating in Chad as Esso), Chevron, and Petronas, and formed into the Tchad Oil Transportation Company. The consortium was American led with Exxon and Chevron combined holding 65% of the stake in the deal, and the consortium promised an investment of $3.7 billion to drill Chad's oil wells and construct a pipeline from the country to Cameroon to export the resources. As agreed upon with the government, some of this money would go to poverty-reduction projects and developing Chad's infrastructure. Chad would receive about 12.5% of the profit made on each barrel exported.

In 2006, President Déby ordered Chevron and Petronas to immediately leave Chad for supposedly refusing to pay $450 million in taxes, leaving Exxon as the sole oil company from the original consortium left in the country. However, many viewed the expulsion as a method to make way for increased Chadian government involvement in the country's oil production or even to make room for Chinese oil companies with Chad recently having restored relations with Beijing. Shortly after, Déby suspended three of his cabinet members including Mahmat Nasser Hassan, Chad's oil minister.

In 2016, a Chadian court levied a $74 billion fine on Exxon, an amount seven times the size of Chad's economy, for allegedly failing to pay royalties. The following year, Exxon settled the dispute and was able to keep its exploration permit.

In 2023, the Chadian government nationalized all the assets and rights including hydrocarbon permits and exploration and production authorisations that belonged to a subsidiary of Exxon Mobil.

=== Chinese activities ===
Chinese involvement in the Chadian economy began in 2006, shortly after N'Djamena restored diplomatic relations with Beijing, and in 2008, China National Petroleum Company entered a joint venture with the Chadian National Hydrocarbon Company to build an oil refinery north of N'djamena with plans to produce 20,000 barrels per day. In addition, the refinery also included a petroleum college and maintains a training program for Chadian locals. Chinese oilmen also began to explore new oil fields and conduct seismic studies and in 2009, exploitation of a new oil field began.

In 2014, Chad suspended China National Petroleum Corporation from exploration for environmental infractions and issued a fine of $1.2 billion. The same year the Chadian government announced its intention to substantially increase oil production in the country from around 100,000 bpd to 260,000 bpd by the end of 2016.

== Pipeline ==
Construction of a pipeline from Chad to Cameroon began in October 2000 with a ceremony in the village of Komé which included representatives from the Chadian and Cameroonian governments, the three oil companies in the consortium, and the World Bank. The pipeline was owned by the oil consortium of Exxon, Chevron, and Petronas, with the governments of Chad and Cameroon maintaining a combined stake of 3% in the project. The World Bank helped finance the pipeline by giving a loan to Chad and Cameroon, hoping the venture would boost development in the region. As a precondition for the loan the World Bank required the oil consortium to prepare a risk assessment and an evaluation of the pipeline's environmental impact. Numerous international observers and non-governmental organizations (NGO) opposed the loan, pointing to Chad's human rights record and rampant corruption.

The 660-mile (1,090 km) long pipeline was completed in 2003 and connected three oil fields in southern Chad with a floating production storage and offloading vessel located in the Atlantic, off the coast of Cameroon, near the town of Kribi. Completed a year ahead of schedule, it created 13,000 jobs in Chad and led to over $400 million in infrastructure improvements. However, in Cameroon, where the majority of the pipeline is located, NGOs have cited several oil spills as being harmful to local communities and have lambasted government officials for not doing more to prevent them.

In 2008, the World Bank ended its involvement in the pipeline after Chad finished repaying its loan, specifying the government's failure to redirect revenue from the project to the earlier agreed upon goals of reducing poverty and developing infrastructure. In a statement the Bank said, “Chad failed to comply with the key requirements of this agreement. The government did not allocate adequate resources critical for poverty reduction.”

== Impact on Chad ==
=== Chadian society ===
Only a small segment of the Chadian population benefits from the oil industry with most of the population still reliant on agriculture, livestock, and fishing for subsistence, with cotton being the primary cash crop. The onset of oil production in the country has, in many cases, actually had a negative impact on other sectors of the economy with many households losing long-held agricultural and grazing lands to foreign oil corporations in exchange for meager compensation. In the Lake Chad area, a region considered to be a regional heartland for agricultural and fishing, oil wells and the construction of a new refinery have limited everyday Chadians from using the area to their economic benefit. Chad continues to be among the poorest nations in the world with levels of poverty well below average, even for sub-Saharan Africa.

=== Misuse of oil revenue ===
Oil production in Chad has led a significant windfall of money for the country's government, much of which has disappeared due to corruption or been used to purchase military weapons and fund conflict. In 2006, after the World Bank froze Chad's oil revenue account over the country's failure to use the money for development, Déby told a French newspaper, "We are going to buy weapons. We're going to do it openly." The Justice and Equality Movement, a Sudanese opposition group active in the Darfur region has been financed using Chadian oil money. A great deal of Chadian petroleum revenue has also been siphoned off through corruption, notably to members of Déby's Zaghawa clan, and his supporters through bloated infrastructure projects and other development plans.

== Production areas ==
=== Doba Basin ===
The Doba Basin is a part of the Central African Rift system and contains the largest share of Chad's crude oil reserves. The basin is about 300 kilometers long and 150 kilometers wide and contains hundreds of oil wells operated principally by Exxon-Mobil. The oil in this region is heavy and sour.

=== Doseo Basin ===
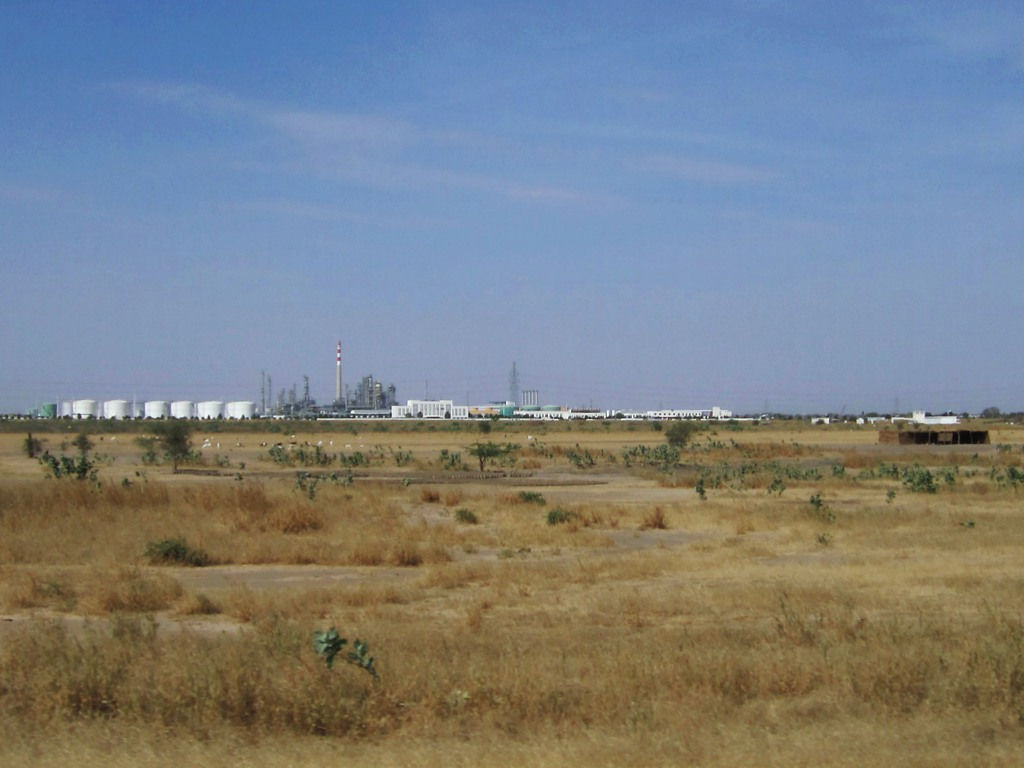
Djermaya oil refinery in Chad.

The Doseo Basin is located east of the Doba Basin and west of the Salamat Basin, and is also a part of the Central African Rift system. It is 480 kilometers long and 90 kilometers wide and has a smaller ratio of sulfur content than in the neighboring Doba Basin.

=== Salamat Basin ===
Located in the lowlands in eastern Chad and parts of the Central African Republic, the Salamat Basin is a less significant oil-producing area that is classified as a transtensional formation. Block H, a compilation of 79 fault blocks, being exploited by CNPC is located in the Salamat Basin.

=== Lake Chad ===
Oil was discovered in the Lake Chad Basin, an area bordering Nigeria, in the 1990s. By the end of 2008, exploitation in the area amounted to 7.5 million tonnes a year. However violence in the area is frequent due to fighting spilling over from nearby Nigeria.

== See also ==
- Economy of Chad
- Mining industry of Chad
- Petroleum industry in Niger
- Idriss Déby
- Chad–China relations
- Elf Aquitaine
- ExxonMobil
