= Doba =

Doba may refer to:

== Places ==
=== Africa ===
- Doba (historical region), historical region in Ethiopia
- Doba (woreda), a district in Ethiopia
  - Doba, Ethiopia, the major city in Doba ward
- Doba, Ghana a community in Ghana
- Doba, Chad, a city in Chad
  - Doba, a former sub-prefecture of Logone Oriental Region, Chad
  - Doba Airport, a public use airport located near Doba, Logone Oriental, Chad
  - Roman Catholic Diocese of Doba, a diocese in Doba in the Ecclesiastical province of N'Djamena, Chad
  - Doba Project, an oil development project in the Doba region
- Doba, Ivory Coast, a town and commune in the San-Pédro Department, Ivory Coast
- RAF El Daba, a village and World War II airfield in Egypt often referred to as Doba Airfield

=== Asia ===
- Doba, Tibet, a village in the Tibet Autonomous Region of China
- Doba, a populated place on Basilaki Island, in the Louisiade Archipelago, Milne Bay Province, Papua New Guinea

=== Europe ===
- Doba, Hungary, a village in Veszprém county, Hungary
- Doba, Satu Mare, a commune in Satu Mare County, Romania
- Doba, Warmian-Masurian Voivodeship, Poland
- DOBA Faculty of Applied Business and Social Studies Maribor, a university in Slovenia
- Doba, a village in Dobrin, Sălaj County, Romania
- Doba, a village in Pleșoiu Commune, Olt County, Romania

== People ==
- Bill Doba (born 1940), an American football coach
- Aleksander Doba (born 1946), a Polish kayaker

== Other uses ==
- Doba (instrument), an Indian musical instrument from Assam
- Doba (drum), a Romanian musical instrument
- Doba language, a Central Sudanic language spoken in Chad
