= Economy of Chad =

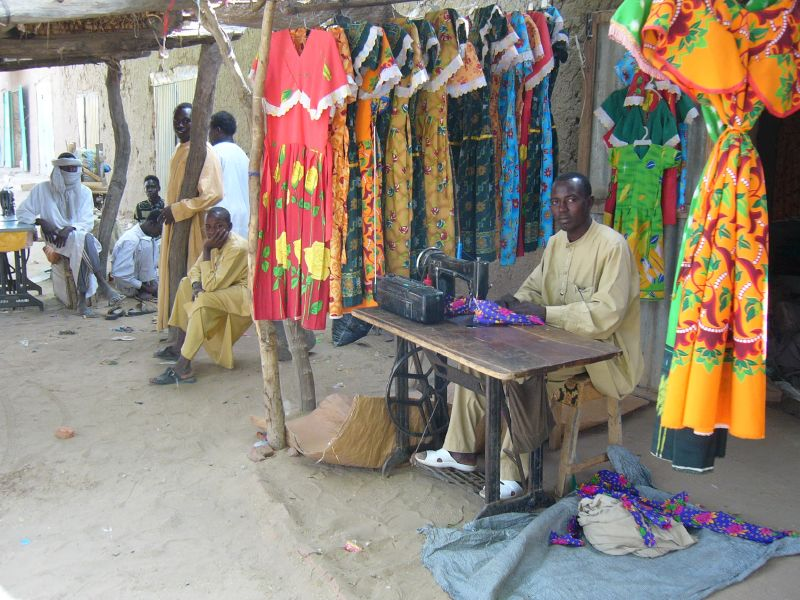
- A tailor in Chad
- Currency: Central African CFA franc (XAF)
- Fiscal year: Calendar year
- Trade organisations: AU, AfCFTA, WTO

Statistics
- GDP: ▼$18.79 billion (nominal; 2025); ▲$56.65 billion (PPP; 2025)
- GDP rank: 130th (nominal; 2025); 131st (PPP; 2025)
- GDP growth: 1.5% (2024); 1.7% (2025)
- GDP per capita: ▼$991 (nominal; 2025); ▲$2,990 (PPP; 2025)
- GDP per capita rank: 171st (nominal; 2025); 170th (PPP; 2025)
- GDP per capita growth: -0.8% (2024)
- GDP by sector: agriculture: 52.7%; industry: 6.7%; services: 40.6%; (2011 est.)
- Inflation (CPI): 4.037% (2018 est.)
- Population below national poverty line: 66.2% (2019 est.)
- Human Development Index: ▲0.394 low (2022) (189th); ▲0.251 low IHDI (2021)
- Labour force: 7.300 million (2018)
- Labour force by occupation: agriculture: 80% (subsistence farming, herding, and fishing); industry and services: 20% (2006 est.)
- Main industries: oil, cotton textiles, meatpacking, brewing, natron (sodium carbonate), soap, cigarettes, construction materials

External
- Exports: $3.48 billion (2024)
- Export goods: oil, cattle, cotton, gum arabic
- Main export partners: Germany 28.7%; China 21.7%; France 19.1%; Netherlands 14.0%; Turkey 5.2%; (2024)
- Imports: $1.16 billion (2024)
- Import goods: machinery and transportation equipment, industrial goods, foodstuffs, textiles
- Main import partners: China 32.2%; France 9.8%; Turkey 8.0%; Niger 7.8%; India 7.1%; (2024)
- FDI stock: $567 million (2019 est.)
- Gross external debt: $3.569 billion (2019 est.)

Public finance
- Foreign reserves: $147.7 million (2019 est.)
- Revenue: $2.501 billion (2011 est.)
- Spending: $3.482 billion (2011 est.)
- Economic aid: $238.3 million (recipient) note – $125 million committed by Taiwan (1997); $30 million committed by African Development Bank; ODA $150 million (2001)
- All values, unless otherwise stated, are in US dollars.

Chad has a developing economy. It suffers from the landlocked country's geographic remoteness, drought, lack of infrastructure, and political turmoil. About 80% of the population depends on subsistence agriculture, including livestock herding. Of Africa's Francophone countries, Chad benefited least from the 50% devaluation of their currencies in January 1994. Financial aid from the World Bank, the African Development Bank, and other sources is directed mainly at improving agriculture, especially livestock production. Because of a lack of financing, the development of oil fields near Doba, originally due to finish in 2000, was delayed until 2003. It was finally developed and then operated by ExxonMobil until 2023, when it was nationalized and put under control of the Chadian government. Regarding gross domestic product, Chad ranks 147th globally with $11.051 billion as of 2018. In August 2026, Afreximbank grants a €110 million loan to Chad for its economic development, specifically for the construction of transport infrastructure linking Chad to Egypt and Libya.

== Sectors ==
=== Agriculture ===
Chad produced in 2023:

- 878 thousand tons of sorghum;
- 782 thousand tons of groundnuts;
- 634 thousand tons of millet;
- 552 thousand tons of cereal;
- 469 thousand tonnes of yam (8th largest producer in the world);
- 454 thousand tons of sugarcane;
- 354 thousand tons of maize;
- 288 thousand tons of cassava;
- 224 thousand tons of rice;
- 218 thousand tons of sweet potato;
- 210 thousand tons of sesame seed;
- 150 thousand tons of beans;
- 165 thousand 480-lb bales of cotton;

In addition to smaller productions of other agricultural products.

=== Mining ===
In the late 1980s, the only mineral exploited in Chad was sodium carbonate, or natron. Also called sal soda or washing soda, natron was used as a salt for medicinal purposes, as a preservative for hides, and as an ingredient in the traditional manufacture of soap; herders also fed it to their animals. Natron deposits were located around the shore of Lake Chad and the wadis of Kanem Prefecture, and near the oasis of Faya-Largeau.

Natron occurs naturally in two forms: white and black. More valuable commercially, hard blocks of black natron were exported to Nigeria. White natron was sold on local markets, principally in N'Djamena and farther to the south. Although efforts were made in the late 1960s to control the commercialization of natron through the creation of a parastatal, by 1970 those efforts had failed because of resistance by traditional chiefs and traders who controlled production through a system of perpetual indebtedness.

A number of other mineral deposits are known, but none had been commercially exploited by the mid-1980s. Bauxite is found in the Soudanian zone, and gold-bearing quartz is reported in Biltine Prefecture. Uranium is reported in the Aozou Strip, as are tin and tungsten in other parts of the Tibesti Mountains, but exploration reports in 1971 for these three minerals did not indicate large or rich deposits. As of 1987, conflicts in the region prevented further exploration.

By far the potentially most important resource is oil. In 1970, a consortium of Conoco, Shell, Chevron, and Exxon started exploration and in 1974 discovered minor oil deposits at Sédigi, near Rig Rig, to the north of Lake Chad. Total reserves at Sédigi were estimated at 60 million tons, or roughly 438 million barrels (69,600,000 m^{3}) of oil. Exploration in 1985 by the Exxon-led consortium discovered potentially large deposits near Doba in the southern region of Chad. Further efforts were suspended in 1986 when world oil prices continued to drop, although the consortium maintained a liaison office in N'Djamena in 1988.

Plans existed in the late 1970s to exploit the deposits at Sédigi and to construct a small refinery at N'Djamena. Those plans lapsed during the conflicts of the late 1970s and early 1980s but were revived in 1986 by the government with the support of the World Bank. The reasons for proceeding with plans to exploit these deposits and build a refinery were clear. The cost of importing petroleum products exceeded the cost of extracting and refining domestic crude, even when international oil prices were low. The plans, which anticipated operations to begin in the early 1990s, included well development in the Sédigi field, a pipeline to N'Djamena, a refinery with a 2,000- to 5,000 barrels per day (790 m^{3}/d) capacity, and the transformation or acquisition of power-generating equipment in the capital to burn the refinery's residual fuel oil. The refinery's output would satisfy 80 percent of Chad's annual fuel needs, including all gasoline, diesel, butane, and kerosene; lubricants and jet fuel, however, would still have to be imported.

== Infrastructure ==
=== Energy ===
The total energy consumption in Chad is of 200.00 million kWh of electric energy per year. Per capita, this is an average of 13 kWh. Chad can provide for itself completely with self-produced energy. The total production of all electric energy producing facilities is 215 m kWh, also 108% of own requirements. The rest of the self-produced energy is either exported into other countries or unused. Along with pure consumptions the production, imports and exports play an important role. Other energy sources such as natural gas or crude oil are also used.

Chad’s ability to achieve increased energy access and poverty reduction is constrained by significant challenges in the power sector. It currently only has about 125 MW of installed generation capacity to serve a population of 14.5 million people. As a result, Chad’s government is working to expand its electricity supply and encourage investment in the energy sector to stimulate the economy. Chad is endowed with the tenth-largest oil reserves in Africa, as well as wind and solar resource potential.

=== Transport ===
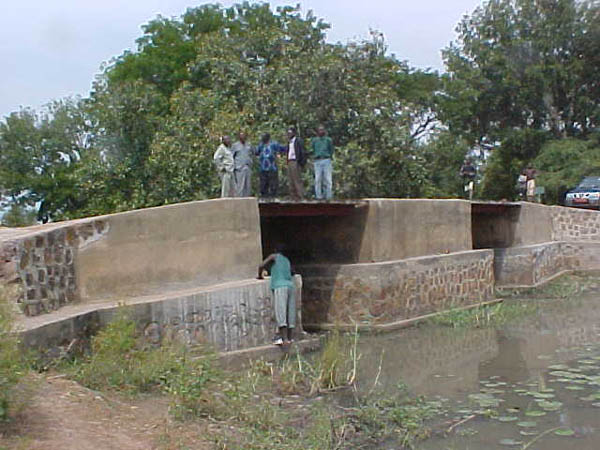
Rebuilt Bridge in south west of Chad over the Bragoto River

Transport infrastructure within Chad is generally poor, especially in the north and east of the country. River transport is limited to the south-west corner. As of 2012, Chad had no railways though two lines are planned - from the capital to the Sudanese and Cameroonian borders during the wet season, especially in the southern half of the country. In the north, roads are merely tracks across the desert and land mines continue to present a danger. Draft animals (horses, donkeys and camels) remain important in much of the country. Fuel supplies can be erratic, even in the south-west of the country, and are expensive. Elsewhere they are practically non-existent.

=== Telecommunications ===
Telecommunications in Chad include radio, television, fixed and mobile telephones, and the Internet.

== Macro-economic trend ==
The following table shows the leading economic indicators from 1980 to 2024. Inflation below 5% is in green.

Year	GDP (in bn. US$ PPP)	GDP per capita (in US$ PPP)	GDP (in bn. US$ nominal)	GDP Growth (real)	Inflation rate	Government debt (Percentage of GDP)
1980	2.3	502	1.0	▼ -6.0%	▲8.6%	n/a
1985	▲3.6	▲709	▲1.3	▲7.9%	▲5.1%	n/a
1990	▲5.2	▲879	▲2.4	▲3.2%	▲0.5%	n/a
1995	▲6.9	▲977	▼2.1	▼ -0.8%	▲5.4%	n/a
2000	▲8.5	▲1012	▼2.0	▼ -0.9%	▲3.8%	▲52.4%
2005	▲18.9	▲1875	▲8.7	▲7.5%	▲4.4%	▼22%
2006	▲19.4	▼1857	▲9.7	▼ -0.5%	▲9.6%	▼20.1%
2007	▲20.8	▲1924	▲10.9	▲4.4%	▲ -7.4%	▼17.6%
2008	▲21.9	▲1955	▲13.4	▲3.1%	▲8.3%	▼15.7%
2009	▼21.7	▼1878	▼12.3	▼ -1.3%	▲10.1%	▲23.9%
2010	▲25.0	▲2092	▲14.1	▲13.8%	▲ -2.1%	▼22.9%
2011	▲26.7	▲2159	▲16.7	▲4.6%	▲2%	▼22.3%
2012	▲29.6	▲2315	▲17.9	▲8.9%	▲7.5%	▼20%
2013	▲31.0	▲2344	17.9	▲2.9%	▲0.2%	▲22.3%
2014	▲32.3	▲2360	▲18.2	▲2.3%	▲ -5.5%	▲29.4%
2015	▲33.6	▲2380	▼14.6	▲3.2%	▲4.8%	▲31.3%
2016	▼32.7	▼2243	▼13.1	▼ -3.7%	▲ -1.6%	▲40.2%
2017	▼32.6	▼2168	▲13.3	▼ -2.1%	▲ -0.9%	▼39.1%
2018	▲35.6	▲2301	▲15.2	▲5.2%	▲4%	▼33.8%
2019	▲39.0	▲2446	▼14.8	▲5.9%	▲ -1%	▲38.4%
2020	▼37.3	▼2270	14.8	0.0%	▲ -2.7%	▲41.6%
2021	▲43.7	▲2581	▲17.0	▲2.0%	▲ -0.8%	▲41.7%
2022	▲48.9	▲2810	▲18.1	▲4.7%	▲5.8%	▼32.1%
2023	▲53.3	▲2973	▲18.6	▲5.0%	▲4.1%	▲32.2%
2024	▲57.3	▲3110	▲20.7	▲5.0%	▲5.7%	▼31.4%
2025	▲62.3	▲3284	▲22.1	▲5.6%	▲ -2.6%	▼30.4%
2026	▲67.4	▲3458	▲25.6	▲5.2%	▲0.5%	▼29.9%

== Other statistics ==
Exports of Chad by product category (2019) Chemical products Transportation Machines Mineral products Plastics and rubbers Metals Foodstuffs Precious metals Textiles Instruments Animal products Vegetable products Paper goods Footwear and headwear Miscellaneous Stone and glass Wood products Animal and vegetable bi-products Animal hides Arts and antiques Weapons

GDP: purchasing power parity – $28.62 billion (2017 est.)

GDP – real growth rate: -3.1% (2017 est.)

GDP – per capita: $2,300 (2017 est.)

Gross national saving: 15.5% of GDP (2017 est.)

GDP – composition by sector:
agriculture: 52.3% (2017 est.)
industry: 14.7% (2017 est.)
services: 33.1% (2017 est.)

Population below poverty line:: 46.7% (2011 est.)

Distribution of family income – Gini index: 43.3 (2011 est.)

Inflation rate (consumer prices): -0.9% (2017 est.)

Labor force: 5.654 million (2017 est.)

Labor force – by occupation: agriculture 80%, industry and services 20% (2006 est.)

Budget:
revenues: 1.337 billion (2017 est.)
expenditures: 1.481 billion (2017 est.)

Budget surplus (+) or deficit (-): -1.5% (of GDP) (2017 est.)

Public debt: 52.5% of GDP (2017 est.)

Industries: oil, cotton textiles, brewing, natron (sodium carbonate), soap, cigarettes, construction materials

Industrial production growth rate: -4% (2017 est.)

electrification: total population: 4% (2013)

electrification: urban areas: 14% (2013)

electrification: rural areas: 1% (2013)

Electricity – production: 224.3 million kWh (2016 est.)

Electricity – production by source:
fossil fuel: ~98%
hydro: 0%
nuclear: 0%
other renewable: ~3% (2017)

Electricity – consumption: 208.6 million kWh (2016 est.)

Electricity – exports: 0 kWh (2016 est.)

Electricity – imports: 0 kWh (2016 est.)

Agriculture – products: cotton, sorghum, millet, peanuts, sesame, corn, rice, potatoes, onions, cassava (manioc, tapioca), cattle, sheep, goats, camels

Exports: $2.464 billion (2017 est.)

Exports – commodities: oil, livestock, cotton, sesame, gum arabic, shea butter

Exports – partners: US 38.7%, China 16.6%, Netherlands 15.7%, UAE 12.2%, India 6.3% (2017)

Imports: $2.16 billion (2017 est.)

Imports – commodities: machinery and transportation equipment, industrial goods, foodstuffs, textiles

Imports – partners: China 19.9%, Cameroon 17.2%, France 17%, US 5.4%, India 4.9%, Senegal 4.5% (2017)

Debt – external: $1.724 billion (31 December 2017 est.)

Reserves of foreign exchange and gold: $22.9 million (31 December 2017 est.)

== See also ==
- Chad
- Economy of Africa
- Petroleum industry in Chad
- United Nations Economic Commission for Africa
