= Haraze Airport =

Airport in Salamat, Chad

Harazé Airport
- IATA: none; ICAO: none

Summary
- Airport type: Public
- Owner: Government
- Serves: Harazé
- Location: Chad
- Elevation AMSL: 1,358 ft / 414 m
- Coordinates: 09°55′54″N 020°54′7″E

Map
- Location of Harazé Airport in Chad

Runways
Direction	Length		Surface
Direction	ft	m	Surface
01/19	4,462	1,360	Clay
- Source: Landings.com

Harazé Airport (Arabic: مطار حراز) is a public use airport located near Harazé, Salamat, Chad.

== See also ==
- List of airports in Chad
