= Iriba Airport =

Airport in Wadi Fira, Chad

- IATA: none; ICAO: none

Summary
- Airport type: Public
- Owner: Government
- Serves: Iriba
- Location: Chad
- Elevation AMSL: 3,061 ft / 933 m
- Coordinates: 15°8′2.7″N 022°13′15.7″E

Map
- Location of Iriba Airport in Chad

Runways
| Direction | Length | | Surface |
| Direction | ft | m | Surface |
|---|---|---|---|
| 09/27 | 5,000 | 1,524 | Dirt |
- Source: Landings.com

Iriba Airport is a public use airport located near Iriba, Wadi Fira, Chad.

== See also ==
- List of airports in Chad
