= Achta Toné Gossingar =

Chadian midwife and health activist (1941–2011)

- Born: 1 July 1941; Abou-Déïa, Salamat, French Equatorial Africa
- Died: 23 November 2011 (aged 70); In flight to Tunis, Tunisia
- Occupations: Midwife, activist, politician
- Known for: First midwife to graduate in Chad; maternal health advocacy
- Political party: Patriotic Salvation Movement (MPS)

Achta Toné Gossingar (1 July 1941 – 23 November 2011) was a Chadian midwife, health activist, and politician. The first midwife to graduate in Chad, from the 1990s until her death in 2011, she led several public health initiatives on behalf of the government of Idriss Déby.

== Early life and education ==
Gossingar was born on 1 July 1941 in Abou-Déïa, Salamat, in what was then the Colony of Chad. In 1965, Gossingar became the first midwife to graduate; she went on to further her studies at Foch Hospital in Suresnes, France.

== Activism ==
=== Political career ===
On 4 December 1990, Gossingar was named as the Secretary State for Public Health with Responsibility for Social Affairs and the Promotion of Women, a role she occupied between 1991 and 1993. She was the first female minister to serve in the Patriotic Salvation Movement government of Idriss Déby, serving in the cabinet of Déby's then-prime minister, Jean Alingué Bawoyeu.

=== Health initiatives ===
Between 1991 and 1997, Gossingar served as the first president of the Chadian Association for Family Welfare. Part of the International Planned Parenthood Federation, Gossingar advocated for the widespread availability of reproductive health across Chad, often with limited financial support. During the 2000s, Gossingar was the director of ASAMOT, an AIDS prevention charity. Gossingar called for educational work to address prevalent misunderstandings among Chadian people about contraceptives, particularly condoms. She also challenged traditional norms around promoting fidelity and abstinence with regards to family planning and sexual health, which she felt did not work in contemporary Chadian society.

On 15 December 2009, the First Lady of Chad, Hinda Déby Itno, appointed Gossingar as a roving ambassador for the Campaign on Accelerated Reduction on Maternal Mortality in Africa (CARMMA), supported by the African Union, with the aim to address high maternal death rates in Chad. Gossingar recommended that the Chadian government focus on recruiting midwives, in addition to providing them with premises and equipment that would provide midwives with financial, material, and technical assistance to prevent maternal deaths. Gossingar felt that support needed to be spread all over Chad, particularly in rural areas which had a lack of medical facilities; she also believed outreach work was required to challenge traditional patriarchal systems that prevented women from making decisions concerning their pregnancies and childbirth. Despite the establishment of CARMMA, a World Health Organisation report in 2011 found that Chad had the second worst maternal death rates in the world, after Afghanistan. Gossingar attributed this to the lack of financial support provided by the government; a request for 275, 344, 600 francs "to save the lives of thousands of women" was declined by the Minister for Health, who instead built a hospital that was unable to run due to a lack of obstetric staff. Gossingar opted to focus on better training the midwives currently in Chad, as well as completing outreach work to educate Chadian women about their health; in September 2011, she launched an outreach programme in all ten districts of N'Djamena, with plans to expand the programme to all of Chad's regions.

== Death and legacy ==
On 24 November 2011, Gossingar died on a flight while she was travelling to a CARMMA conference in Tunis, Tunisia. She was 70 years old. Gossingar was succeeded in her role as CARMMA ambassador by Blondeau Georgina Fatimé, who had followed Gossingar as one of the first midwives in Chad.

A short film about Gossingar's life, entitled Respects, hommage à Mme Gossingar (lit. 'Respect, a tribute to Ms Gossingar'), premiered at the RESPECTS festival in N'Djamena in 2010.
