= Chadra =

Chadra may refer to:

- Chadra, Chad
- Chadra, Lebanon
