= University of Science and Technology of Ati =

University in Chad

Coordinates: 13.2307°N 18.3589°E

- Université des sciences et de technologie d'Ati
- Type: Public university
- Established: March 2008; 18 years ago
- Location: Ati, Batha, Chad
- Language: French

The University of Science and Technology of Ati (USTA) was founded in March 2008. It is located near Ati, Chad. in the Batha region, in central Chad.

== Faculties ==
USTA has three faculties:

- Faculty of Agro-Pastoral and Agro-Food Sciences
- Faculty of Technology
- Faculty of Earth, Life, and Environmental Sciences

== See also ==
- Higher education in Chad
