= Salal Airport =

- IATA: none; ICAO: none

Summary
- Airport type: Public
- Serves: Salal
- Location: Chad
- Elevation AMSL: 984 ft / 300 m
- Coordinates: 14°51′0″N 017°13′0″E

Map
- Location of Salal Airport in Chad

Runways
Direction	Length		Surface
Direction	ft	m	Surface
04/22	1,969	600	Clay
- Source: Landings.com

Salal Airport is a public use airport located near Salal, Bahr el Gazel, Chad.

== See also ==
- List of airports in Chad
