= MXR (disambiguation) =

MXR is a New-York-based manufacturer of effects pedals from Rochester.

MXR may also refer to:

- MXR (broadcaster), a former operator of DAB multiplexes in England and Wales
- MX Aircraft MXR, a single-seat aerobatic aircraft built by MX Aircraft Company
- Postal code for Munxar, Gozo, Malta
- Alias for Moussoro Airport
- ISO 639 code for the Murik Kayan language, an Austronesian language spoken in Sarawak, Malaysia
- IATA code for Myrhorod Air Base
