= Achta Ahmat Bremé =

Chadian politician

- Born: Am Timan, Salmat Region of Chad
- Citizenship: Chad
- Education: Baccalaureate, Lycée Technique Commercial, 1991 Technician diploma in insurance, Institut International des Assurances, Yaoundé, Cameroon, 1994 Bachelor of Business Administration, University of Quebec, Montréal, Canada, 2000 - 2008
- Occupations: Politician, Minister
- Years active: Economic Affairs Advisor, Ministry of Finance, 2007 - 2014 Deputy Director General for Foreign Trade, Ministry of Mines, Industrial and Commercial Development, and Promotion of the Private Sector, November 2014 - May 2018 Chief Negotiator (Chad) for the African Continental Free Trade Area negotiation, February 2016 - May 2018 Minister of Territorial Planning, Urban Development, and Housing of Chad, May 2018 - July 2020 Minister of Vocational Training and Trades 1 July 2020 - May 2021.

Achta Ahmat Bremé was born in Am Timan in the Salamat region of Chad. She is a Chadian politician. From 2018 to 2020, she served as the Minister of Territorial Planning, Urban Development, & Housing for the Republic of Chad. Bremé has also been the Minister of Vocational Training and Small Trades.

== Biography ==
Achta Ahmat Bremé began her primary and secondary education in her hometown of Am Timan. She then moved to the capital, N’Djaména, to continue her studies at the Lycée Technique Commercial, where she obtained her baccalaureate in 1991. In 1994, she earned a technician diploma in insurance from the Institut International des Assurances in Yaoundé, Cameroon. In 2000, she went to Montréal, Canada to study at the University of Quebec, graduating in 2008 with a Bachelor of Business Administration.

== Career ==
After completing her education, Achta Ahmat Bremé held several positions in the Chadian public administration. She was Economic Affairs Advisor at the Ministry of Finance from 2007 to 2014. She then became Deputy Director General for Foreign Trade at the Ministry of Mines, Industrial and Commercial Development, and Promotion of the Private Sector in 2014. From November 2014 to May 2018, she served as Chad’s focal point for the cotton sector initiative. At the same time, from February 2016 to May 2018, she was Chad’s chief negotiator for the African Continental Free Trade Area negotiations.

In May 2018, she was appointed Minister of Territorial Planning, Urban Development, and Housing of Chad. She held this office until July 2020. In July 2020, she was appointed Minister of Vocational Training and Trades 1 and served until May 2021.
