= FTTS =

FTTTS may refer to:

- Future Tactical Truck System, canceled U.S. Army truck program
- ICAO airport code for Bousso Airport
