= Dékati =

- Location in Chad
- Coordinates: 10°43′10″N 21°14′47″E
- Country: Chad
- Region: Salamat
- Department: Haraze Mangueigne
- Time zone: UTC+1 (WAT)

Dékati is a town in the Haraze Mangueigne Department in the Salamat Region of eastern Chad.
