= Koukou Angarana Airport =

- IATA: none; ICAO: none

Summary
- Airport type: Public
- Serves: Koukou Angarana
- Location: Chad
- Elevation AMSL: 1,680 ft / 512 m
- Coordinates: 12°0′26.3″N 021°40′23.1″E

Map
- Location of Koukou Angarana Airport in Chad

Runways
Direction	Length		Surface
Direction	ft	m	Surface
04/22	2,690	820	Gravel
- Source: Landings.com

Koukou Angarana Airport is a public use airport located near Koukou Angarana, Sila, Chad.

== See also ==
- List of airports in Chad
