= Am Timan Airport =

- IATA: AMC; ICAO: FTTN

Summary
- Airport type: Public
- Owner: Government
- Location: Am Timan, Chad
- Elevation AMSL: 1,421 ft (433 m)
- Coordinates: 11°2′7.7″N 020°16′29.8″E

Map
- Location of Am Timan Airport in Chad

Runways
Direction	Length		Surface
Direction	ft	m	Surface
04/22	6,880	1,892	Concrete
- Source: Landings.com

Am Timan Airport (IATA: AMC, ICAO: FTTN) (Arabic: مطار م تيمان) is an airport serving Am Timan in Chad.

== History ==
Am Timan Airport is located in the Salamat region of Chad. It provides domestic flights to the country's capital N'Djamena. Its only runway is a concrete surface measuring 1,892 meters. In March 2019, Tarco Airlines from Sudan started a weekly flight from the airport to Khartoum.

== See also ==
- List of airports in Chad
