= Bokoro Airport =

Airport in Hadjer-Lamis, Chad

- IATA: BKR; ICAO: FTTK

Summary
- Airport type: Public
- Serves: Bokoro
- Location: Chad
- Elevation AMSL: 988 ft / 301 m
- Coordinates: 12°23′7.8″N 017°4′15.4″E

Map
- Location of Bokoro Airport in Chad

Runways
Direction	Length		Surface
Direction	ft	m	Surface
05/23	4,170	1,271	Dirt
- Source: Landings.com

Bokoro Airport (IATA: BKR, ICAO: FTTK) is a public use airport located near Bokoro, Hadjer-Lamis, Chad.

== See also ==
- List of airports in Chad
