= Djiour Southwest Airport =

- IATA: none; ICAO: none

Summary
- Airport type: Public
- Serves: Djiour
- Location: Chad
- Elevation AMSL: 1,083 ft / 330 m
- Coordinates: 09°58′43.7″N 016°39′55.4″E

Map
- Location of Djiour Southwest Airport in Chad

Runways
Direction	Length		Surface
Direction	ft	m	Surface
08/26	3,060	933	Grass
- Source: Landings.com

Djiour Southwest Airport is a public use airport located near Djiour, Tandjilé, Chad.

== See also ==
- List of airports in Chad
