= Kélo Airport =

Kélo Airstrip
- IATA: none; ICAO: none

Summary
- Airport type: Public
- Serves: Kélo
- Location: Chad
- Elevation AMSL: 1,240 ft / 378 m
- Coordinates: 09°18′50.4″N 015°47′11.2″E

Map
- Location of Kélo Airstrip in Chad

Runways
Direction	Length		Surface
Direction	ft	m	Surface
05/23	3,040	927	Dirt
- Source: Landings.com

Kélo Airstrip is a public use airport located near Kélo, Tandjilé, Chad.

== See also ==
- List of airports in Chad
