= Tari West Airport =

- IATA: none; ICAO: none

Summary
- Airport type: Public
- Serves: Tari
- Location: Chad
- Elevation AMSL: 1,079 ft / 329 m
- Coordinates: 10°1′57.3″N 017°16′44.5″E

Map
- Location of Tari West Airport in Chad

Runways
Direction	Length		Surface
Direction	ft	m	Surface
03/21	3,360	1,024	Grass
- Source: Landings.com

Tari West Airport is a public use airport located near Tari, Chari-Baguirmi, Chad.

== See also ==
- List of airports in Chad
