= Adjodol =

Adjodol أجودول
- Village
- Location in Chad
- Coordinates: 12°41′20″N 15°34′0″E
- Country: Chad
- Region: Hadjer-Lamis
- Department: Haraze Al Biar
- Time zone: +1

Adjodol (Arabic: أجودول) is a village in the Haraze Al Biar Department of Chad. It lies along the road southwest of Massakory, 28 kilometres northeast of Massaguet.
