= Naramay East Airport =

- IATA: none; ICAO: none

Summary
- Airport type: Public
- Serves: Naramay
- Location: Chad
- Elevation AMSL: 1,063 ft / 324 m
- Coordinates: 10°11′54.9″N 016°52′5.6″E

Map
- Location of Naramay East Airport in Chad

Runways
Direction	Length		Surface
Direction	ft	m	Surface
04/22	3,400	1,036	Grass
- Source: Landings.com

Naramay East Airport is a single runway public use airport located near Naramay, Chari-Baguirmi, Chad. The runway, 3400 feet in length is an unimproved grass surface.

== See also ==
- List of airports in Chad
