= N'Gouri Airport =

- IATA: none; ICAO: none

Summary
- Airport type: Public
- Serves: N'Gouri
- Location: Chad
- Elevation AMSL: 919 ft / 280 m
- Coordinates: 13°38′0″N 015°21′0″E

Map
- Location of N'Gouri Airport in Chad

Runways
Direction	Length		Surface
Direction	ft	m	Surface
07/25	2,133	650	Gravel
- Source: Landings.com

N'Gouri Airport is a public use airport located near N'Gouri, Lac, Chad.

== See also ==
- List of airports in Chad
