= Moussoro Airport =

- IATA: none; ICAO: none

Summary
- Airport type: Public
- Serves: Moussoro
- Location: Chad
- Elevation AMSL: 984 ft / 300 m
- Coordinates: 13°38′45.7″N 016°30′6.3″E

Map
- Location of Moussoro Airport in Chad

Runways
Direction	Length		Surface
Direction	ft	m	Surface
03/21	3,930	1,198	Asphalt
- Source: Landings.com

Moussoro Airport (Arabic: مطار موسورو) is a public use airport located 1 kilometre (1 mi) east-northeast of Moussoro, Bahr el Gazel, Chad.

== See also ==
- List of airports in Chad
