= University of Doba =

University in Doba, Chad

Coordinates: 8.713°N 16.820°E

- Université de Doba
- Type: Public university
- Established: 2010; 16 years ago
- President: Djikoloum Benjamin Benan
- Students: 5050
- Location: Doba, Logone Oriental, Chad
- Language: French and Arabic

The University of Doba is a Chadian public institution of higher education located in the city of Doba.

== History ==
The bill for the creation of the University of Doba was examined and adopted by the Chadian Council of Ministers on 18 November 2010. As of March 2012, it was not yet functional.

== List of presidents ==
- 8 June 2011: Jérôme Mbainaibeye, Vice-president: Edith Kadjangaba
- July 13, 2023: Djikoloum Benjamin Benan

== See also ==
- Higher education in Chad
