= Koumra Airport =

- IATA: none; ICAO: none

Summary
- Airport type: Public
- Serves: Koumra
- Location: Chad
- Elevation AMSL: 1,401 ft / 427 m
- Coordinates: 08°55′40.6″N 017°34′41.2″E

Map
- Location of Koumra Airport in Chad

Runways
Direction	Length		Surface
Direction	ft	m	Surface
07/25	4,000	1,219	Grass
- Source: Landings.com

Koumra Airport is a public use airport located near Koumra, Mandoul, Chad.

== See also ==
- List of airports in Chad
