= Kobé =

Department of Wadi Fira, Chad

Coordinates: 15°07′41″N 22°14′59″E

Kobé (Arabic: كوبي) is one of three departments in Wadi Fira, a region of Chad. Its capital is Iriba.

== See also ==
- Departments of Chad
