= Mao Airport =

- IATA: AMO; ICAO: FTTU

Summary
- Airport type: Public
- Serves: Mao
- Location: Chad
- Elevation AMSL: 1,165 ft / 355 m
- Coordinates: 14°8′47.2″N 015°18′54.5″E

Map
- Location of Mao Airport in Chad

Runways
Direction	Length		Surface
Direction	ft	m	Surface
07/25	5,040	1,536	Brick?
- Source: Landings.com

Mao Airport (IATA: AMO, ICAO: FTTU) (Arabic: مطار ماو) is a public use airport located near Mao, Kanem, Chad.

== See also ==
- List of airports in Chad
