= Dourgoulanga =

- Sub-prefecture
- Location in Chad
- Coordinates: 14.387°N 16.881°E
- Country: Chad

Dourgoulanga is a sub-prefecture of Bahr el Gazel in Chad.
