= Michemiré =

Michemiré Mechimere
- Sub-prefecture
- Location in Chad
- Coordinates: 13.824°N 15.744°E
- Country: Chad

Michemiré is a sub-prefecture of Bahr el Gazel in Chad.
