= Daguessa Airport =

- IATA: none; ICAO: none

Summary
- Airport type: Public
- Owner: Government
- Location: Daguessa, Chad
- Elevation AMSL: 1,821 ft / 555 m
- Coordinates: 12°01′59″N 022°25′05″E

Map
- Location of Daguessa Airport in Chad

Runways
Direction	Length		Surface
Direction	ft	m	Surface
13/31	4,000	1,219	Unpaved
- Source: Landings.com

Daguessa Airport is a public use airport located near Daguessa, Sila, Chad.

== See also ==
- List of airports in Chad
