= Ati Airport =

Airport in Batha, Chad

- IATA: ATV; ICAO: FTTI

Summary
- Airport type: Public
- Serves: Ati
- Location: Chad
- Elevation AMSL: 1,096 ft (334 m)
- Coordinates: 13°14′23.0″N 018°18′48.9″E

Map
- Location of Ati Airport in Chad

Runways
Direction	Length		Surface
Direction	ft	m	Surface
09/27	4,250	1,295	Asphalt
- Source: Landings.com

Ati Airport (IATA: ATV, ICAO: FTTI) (Arabic: مطار أتي) is a public use airport located near Ati, in the Batha region of Chad.

== See also ==
- List of airports in Chad
