= Borkou Department =

Department of Borkou, Chad

Coordinates: 17.9167°N 19.1167°E

Borkou (Arabic: بوركو) is one of two departments of the Borkou Region in Chad . It was established by Ordinance No. 002/PR/08 of 19 February 2008. Its capital is Faya-Largeau.

Bourkou was formerly one of four departments in the Bourkou-Ennedi-Tibesti Region of Chad, in the northern Saharan territory of Borkou. In 2008 the Bourkou-Ennedi-Tibesti Region was split into three, and the former Bourkou department became a separate region under the same name.

== Sub-prefectures ==
The department of Borkou is divided into two sub-prefectures:

- Faya-Largeau
- Kouba Olanga

== See also ==
Departments of Chad
