= Beguelkar Airport =

Airport in Logone Oriental, Chad

- IATA: none; ICAO: none

Summary
- Airport type: Public
- Serves: Beguelkar
- Location: Chad
- Elevation AMSL: 1,936 ft / 590 m
- Coordinates: 08°3′25.8″N 016°9′40.4″E

Map
- Location of Beguelkar Airport in Chad

Runways
Direction	Length		Surface
Direction	ft	m	Surface
10/28	2,970	905	Grass
- Source: Landings.com

Beguelkar Airport is a public use airport located near Beguelkar, Logone Oriental, Chad.

== See also ==
- List of airports in Chad
