= Haraze Mangueigne Department =

Department of Chad

Coordinates: 9.9350°N 20.7722°E

Haraze Mangueigne is one of three departments in Salamat, a region of Chad. Its capital is Haraze.

== Towns ==
- Dékati

== See also ==
- Departments of Chad
