= Tchagen Airport =

- IATA: none; ICAO: none

Summary
- Airport type: Public
- Serves: Tchagen
- Location: Chad
- Elevation AMSL: 1,096 ft (334 m)
- Coordinates: 10°2′21.9″N 016°18′57.4″E

Map
- Location of Tchagen Airport in Chad

Runways
Direction	Length		Surface
Direction	ft	m	Surface
16/34	2,700	823	Grass
- Source: Landings.com

Tchagen Airport is a public use airport located near Tchagen, Tandjilé, Chad.

== See also ==
- List of airports in Chad
