= Pala Airport =

- IATA: PLF; ICAO: FTTP

Summary
- Airport type: Public
- Serves: Pala
- Location: Chad
- Elevation AMSL: 1,493 ft / 455 m
- Coordinates: 09°22′48.1″N 014°55′33.5″E

Map
- Location of Pala Airport in Chad

Runways
Direction	Length		Surface
Direction	ft	m	Surface
05/23	5,150	1,570	Dirt
- Source: Landings.com

Pala Airport (IATA: PLF, ICAO: FTTP) (Arabic: مطار بالا) is a public use airport located near Pala, Mayo-Kebbi Ouest, Chad.

== See also ==
- List of airports in Chad
