= Baïbokoum Airport =

Airport in Logone Oriental, Chad

- IATA: none; ICAO: none

Summary
- Airport type: Public
- Serves: Baïbokoum
- Location: Chad
- Elevation AMSL: 1,476 ft / 450 m
- Coordinates: 07°45′54.9″N 015°42′13.4″E

Map
- Location of Baïbokoum Airport in Chad

Runways
Direction	Length		Surface
Direction	ft	m	Surface
15/33	2,710	826	Gravel
- Source: Landings.com

Baïbokoum Airport is a public use airport located near Baïbokoum, Logone Oriental, Chad.

== See also ==
- List of airports in Chad
