= Aboudeïa Department =

- Location within Chad Location within Africa
- Coordinates: 11°27′11″N 19°16′47″E
- Country: Chad

Aboudeïa is one of three departments in Salamat, a region of Chad. Its capital is Aboudeïa.
