= Moïssala Airport =

- IATA: none; ICAO: none

Summary
- Airport type: Public
- Serves: Moïssala
- Location: Chad
- Elevation AMSL: 1,253 ft / 382 m
- Coordinates: 08°20′52.5″N 017°45′36.7″E

Map
- Location of Moïssala Airport in Chad

Runways
Direction	Length		Surface
Direction	ft	m	Surface
02/20	2,690	820	Grass
- Source: Landings.com

Moïssala Airport is a public use airport located near Moïssala, Mandoul, Chad.

== See also ==
- List of airports in Chad
