= Fianga Airport =

- IATA: none; ICAO: none

Summary
- Airport type: Public
- Serves: Fianga
- Location: Chad
- Elevation AMSL: 1,063 ft / 324 m
- Coordinates: 09°55′21.8″N 015°7′6.3″E

Map
- Location of Fianga Airport in Chad

Runways
Direction	Length		Surface
Direction	ft	m	Surface
07/25	1,940	591	Dirt
- Source: Landings.com

Fianga Airport is a public use airport located near Fianga, Mayo-Kebbi Est, Chad.

== See also ==
- List of airports in Chad
