= Gounou-Gaya Airport =

- IATA: none; ICAO: none

Summary
- Airport type: Public
- Serves: Gounou-Gaya
- Location: Chad
- Elevation AMSL: 1,132 ft / 345 m
- Coordinates: 09°38′15.4″N 015°30′18.6″E

Map
- Location of Gounou-Gaya Airport in Chad

Runways
Direction	Length		Surface
Direction	ft	m	Surface
05/23	2,840	866	Sand
- Source: Landings.com

Gounou-Gaya Airport is a public use airport located near Gounou-Gaya, Mayo-Kebbi Est, Chad.

== See also ==
- List of airports in Chad
