= Dildo Airport =

Kome Airport
- IATA: none; ICAO: FTTK

Summary
- Airport type: Private
- Serves: Kome
- Location: Chad
- Elevation AMSL: 1,299 ft (396 m)
- Coordinates: 08°31′32.3″N 016°48′37.67″E

Map
- Location of Kome Airport in Chad

Runways
Direction	Length		Surface
Direction	ft	m	Surface
04/22	6,561	2,000	Laterite
- Source: Landings.com

Kome Airport is a public use airport located near Dildo, Logone Oriental, Chad.

== See also ==
- List of airports in Chad
