= Matadjana =

- Sub-prefecture
- Location in Chad
- Country: Chad

Matadjana is a sub-prefecture of Wadi Fira Region in Chad.
