= Koro Toro Airport =

Airport in Chad

Koro-Toro Airport
- IATA: none; ICAO: none

Summary
- Airport type: Public
- Serves: Koro-Toro, Chad
- Elevation AMSL: 243 m (797 ft)
- Coordinates: 16°03′N 018°29′E

Map
- Location within Chad

Runways
Direction	Length		Surface
Direction	m	ft	Surface
04/22	1,000	3,281	Clay / sand
- Source: AIS ASECNA

Koro-Toro Airport is an airport serving Koro-Toro, located in the Borkou region in Chad.

== Facilities ==
The airport is at an elevation of 243 metres (797 ft) above mean sea level. It has one runway designated 04/22 with a clay and sand surface measuring 1,000 by 30 metres (3,281 ft × 98 ft).
