= Doba Airport =

Airport in Logone Oriental, Chad

- IATA: none; ICAO: none

Summary
- Airport type: Public
- Serves: Doba
- Location: Chad
- Elevation AMSL: 1,296 ft / 395 m
- Coordinates: 08°42′2.0″N 016°50′3.0″E

Map
- Location of Doba Airport in Chad

Runways
| Direction | Length | | Surface |
| Direction | ft | m | Surface |
|---|---|---|---|
| 03/21 | 4,980 | 1,518 | Dirt |
- Source: Landings.com

Doba Airport (Arabic: مطار دوبا) is a public use airport located near Doba, Logone Oriental, Chad.

== See also ==
- List of airports in Chad
