= Koro Toro =

Settlement in Borkou Region, Chad

Coordinates: 16°03′54″N 18°30′03″E

Koro Toro is a settlement in the southern Borkou Region of Chad. It hosts the Koro Toro Airport and a "notorious" maximum security desert prison used by the Chadian government to detain captured fighters of Boko Haram and Chadian rebel groups. According to the Chadian opposition, Koro Toro is factually a penal colony.

It is also known as anthropological and archaeological site, as the fossil hominin Australopithecus bahrelghazali was discovered at Koro Toro in January 1995.

== See also ==
- Yaho (archeological site)
