= Daguessa =

Daguessa داغسا
- Location in Chad
- Coordinates: 12°00′N 022°27′E
- Country: Chad
- Region: Sila
- Time zone: UTC+1 (WAT)

Daguessa (Arabic: داغسا) is a town in the Sila Region of eastern Chad, on the country's border with Sudan.

Prior to 2008 it was located in the former Sila Department of the Ouaddaï Region.

The town was involved in the Darfur conflict. On November 29, 2006, villages in the Daguessa area were attacked by armed men on horseback who stole the villagers' cattle.

== Transport ==
The town is served by Daguessa Airport.
