= Bousso Airport =

Airport in Chari-Baguirmi, Chad

- IATA: OUT; ICAO: FTTS

Summary
- Airport type: Public
- Owner: Government
- Serves: Bousso
- Location: Chad
- Elevation AMSL: 1,102 ft / 336 m
- Coordinates: 10°29′30.1″N 016°43′13.6″E

Map
- Location of Bousso Airport in Chad

Runways
Direction	Length		Surface
Direction	ft	m	Surface
03/21	3,480	1,061	Grass
- Source: Landings.com

Bousso Airport (IATA: OUT, ICAO: FTTS) is a public use airport located near Bousso, Chari-Baguirmi, Chad.

== See also ==
- List of airports in Chad
