= Mandjoura =

- Sub-prefecture
- Location in Chad
- Coordinates: 13.816°N 17.080°E
- Country: Chad

Mandjoura is a sub-prefecture of Bahr el Gazel in Chad.
