= Abou-Deïa =

Abou-Deïa أبو ديا Aboudeïa
- Location in Chad
- Coordinates: 11°27′05″N 019°16′48″E
- Country: Chad
- Region: Salamat
- Department: Abou-Deïa
- Time zone: UTC+1 (WAT)

Abou-Deïa or Aboudeïa (Arabic: أبو ديا) is a town in the Salamat Region of south-central Chad. It is the capital of Aboudeïa Department.

== Geographical location ==
The city is located in southeastern Chad, north of the wadi Korom, west of Wadi Avis, 508 meters above sea level. Abou-Deïa is located about 456 kilometers east-southeast from the capital N'Djamena.

== Climate ==
The climate of the city is described as semi-arid (BSh) in the Köppen climate classification. The average annual temperature is 27.9 °C. The average temperature of the coldest month (January) is 25.3 °C, and that of the warmest (April) is 31.9 °C. The estimated year-round precipitation is 772 mm. The amount of precipitation is unevenly distributed throughout the year, with the most precipitation occurring from May to October. The greatest amount of precipitation falls in August (250 mm).

== Airport ==
Abou-Deïa Airport
- IATA: AOD; ICAO: none

Summary
- Airport type: Public
- Operator: Government
- Serves: Abou-Deïa, Chad
- Elevation AMSL: 480 m (1,570 ft)
- Coordinates: 11°28′N 019°17′E

Map
- Location of airport in Chad

Runways
Direction	Length		Surface
Direction	m	ft	Surface
11/29	1,400	4,593	Clay
- Source: AIS ASECNA

Abou-Deïa Airport (IATA: AOD) (Arabic: مطار أبو ديا), or Aboudeïa, is an airstrip serving Abou-Deïa. The airport resides at an elevation of 480 metres (1,575 ft) above mean sea level. It has one runway designated 11/29 with a clay surface measuring 1,400 by 42 metres (4,593 ft × 138 ft).

== Notable citizens ==
- Achta Toné Gossingar (1941–2011): the first midwife in Chad
