= West and Central African Rift System =

Rift system in Africa composed of two Cretaceous-era sub-systems

The West and Central African Rift System, with the Central African Shear Zone labeled CASZ

The West and Central African Rift System (WCARS) is a rift system composed of two coeval Cretaceous rift sub-systems, the West African Rift sub-system (WAS) and the Central African Rift sub-system (CAS). These are genetically related, but are physically separated and show structural differences. The Logone Birni Basin constitutes a transitional area between the two sub-systems.

The WCARS is older than the East African Rift System.

== Formation ==
The West and Central Africa Rift System formed from the Early Cretaceous separation of Africa and South America. This rifting almost tore apart the African continent but instead formed a complex system of extensional, wrench and pull-apart basins. Such basins can be found from Nigeria and Cameroon on the Atlantic, east into Chad and the Central African Republic, through Sudan to Kenya on the Indian Ocean and north of Lake Chad extending into southern Algeria.

There were five major tectonic phases that formed the WCARS:

- The Pan African Crustal consolidation 750-550 Ma
- Paleozoic-Jurassic platform development 550-130 Ma
- Early Cretaceous rift 130-98 Ma; Late Cretaceous rift 98-75 Ma
- Maastrichtian-Paleogene rift and emergence 75-30 Ma
- Neogene-Recent emergence 30-0 Ma
