= Moyto Airstrip =

Airstrip in south-western Chad

Moyto Airport
- IATA: none; ICAO: none

Summary
- Airport type: Public
- Serves: Moyto, Chad
- Elevation AMSL: 270 m (890 ft)
- Coordinates: 12°35′N 016°32′E

Map
- Location within Chad

Runways
Direction	Length		Surface
Direction	m	ft	Surface
11/29	1,400	4,593	Dirt
- Source: AIS ASECNA

Moyto Airport is an airstrip serving Moyto (or Moïto), a town in the Hadjer-Lamis Region of Chad.

== Facilities ==
The airport is at an elevation of 270 metres (886 ft) above mean sea level. It has one runway designated 11/29 with a dirt surface measuring 1,400 by 35 metres (4,593 ft × 115 ft).
