= Bahr el Gazel Sud =

Department of Bahr el Gazel, Chad

Bahr el Gazel Sud is one of two departments of Chad in Bahr el Gazel, a region of Chad. Its capital is Moussoro.

== See also ==
- Departments of Chad
