= Chadra, Chad =

Chadra
- Location in Chad
- Coordinates: 13°26′34″N 16°03′03″E
- Country: Chad
- Region: Barh El Gazel
- Department: Barh El Gazel Sud
- Sub-Prefecture: Chadra

Population (2009)
  - Total: 54,072
- Time zone: +1

Chadra, Chedra, or Cheddra is a settlement in the Bahr el Gazel (region of Chad), situated 174 km (108 mi) northeast of N'Djamena. In 2009, the population of Chadra was 54,072, which included 27,656 males, and 26,416 females.

== Climate ==
Chadra is classified by Köppen-Geiger climate classification system as hot desert (BWh). In Chadra, the average annual temperature is 29.7 °C (85.5 °F). Rainfall averages 142 mm (5.6 in).
