= Borkou (region of Chad) =

Region of Chad

Coordinates: 17.9167°N 19.1167°E

Borkou بوركو Būrkū
- Province
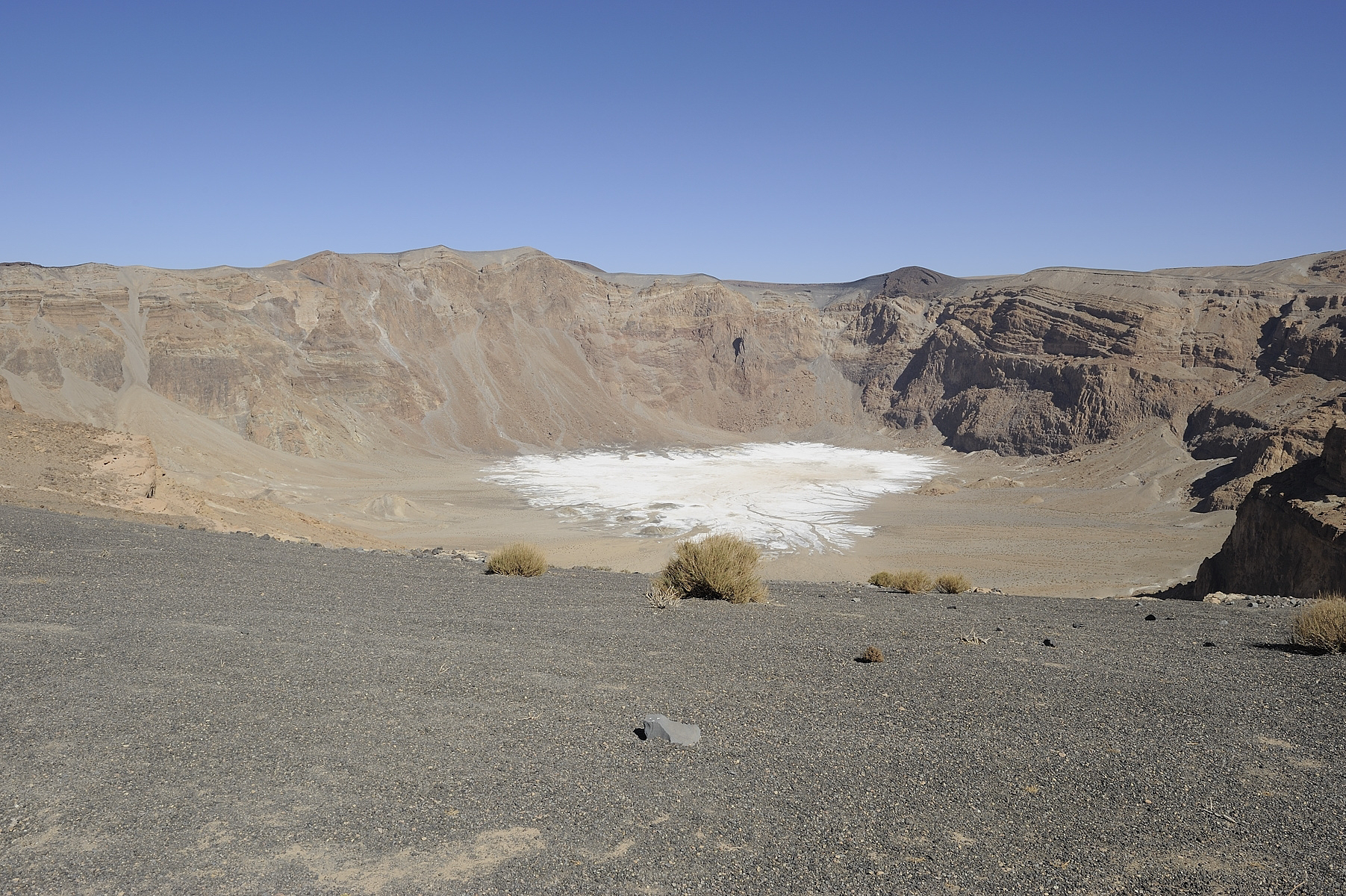
- Inner crater of Emi Koussi, highest mountain in Chad, located in Borkou

- Map of Chad showing the Borkou province
- Country: Chad
- Departments: 2
- Sub-prefectures: 4
- Province: 2012
- Capital: Faya-Largeau

Area
  - Total: 271,513 km^{2} (104,832 sq mi)

Population (2009)
  - Total: 97,251
  - Density: 0.35818/km^{2} (0.92769/sq mi)
- Time zone: UTC+01:00 (WAT)

The Borkou region (Arabic: بوركو, romanised: Būrkū) is a province of Chad which was created in 2008 from the Borkou department of the former Borkou-Ennedi-Tibesti region. Its capital is Faya-Largeau.

== Geography ==
Borkou is located in the Sahara Desert, and contains parts of the Tibesti Mountains in its north. The highest point in Chad, Emi Koussi, is located in Borkou. The Bodélé Depression lies in the south-central portion of the region.

The province borders Libya to the north, Ennedi-Ouest Region to the east, Wadi Fira Region, Batha Region, Bahr el Gazel Region and Kanem Region to the south, and Niger and Tibesti Region the west. The region's northern border lies within the Aouzou Strip, historically a point of dispute between Chad and Libya.

=== Settlements ===
Faya-Largeau is the provincial capital; other major settlements include Gouro, Kirdimi, Koro Toro and Yarda.

== Demographics ==
As per the census of 2009, the population of the region was 97,251, 46.6% female. The average size of household as of 2009 is 6.00: 6.00 in rural households and 5.80 in urban areas. The total number of households was 16,191: 10,584 in rural areas and 5,607 in urban areas. The number of nomads in the region was 8,221, 2.1% of the population. There were 96,459 people residing in private households. There were 47,285 above 18 years of ages: 24,775 male and 22,510 female. The sex ratio was 114.00 females for every hundred males. There were 89,030 sedentary staff, 0.80 of the total population. The Dazaga and Tedaga are the dominant ethnic groups in the region.

== Administration ==
As a part of decentralisation in February 2003, the country is administratively split into regions, departments, municipalities and rural communities. The prefectures which were originally 14 in number were re-designated in 17 regions. The regions are administered by Governors appointed by the President. Prefects, who originally held the responsibility of the 14 prefectures, still retained their titles and were responsible for the administration of smaller departments in each region. The members of local assemblies are elected every six years, while the executive organs are elected every three years. As of 2016, there are totally 23 regions in Chad, which are divided based on population and administrative convenience. The Borkou region is divided into two departments, namely, Borkou (capital Faya-Largeau) and Borkou Yala (capital Kirdimi, also called Kirdi). On 10 August 2018, a new ordinance (Note: Ordinance No. 038/PR/2018) divided Chad into 23 provinces, 107 departments, and 377 communes. The names of the former regions remained the same but were now called provinces.

== History ==
The historical region of Borku (French: Borkou) or Borgu (Borgou), mostly in Northern Chad, formed part of the transitional zone between the arid wastes of the Sahara and the fertile lands of central Sudan. It was bounded to the north by the Tibesti Mountains, and is in great measure occupied by its foothills. These hills to the south and east merge into the plains of Ouaddaï and Darfur. South-west, in the direction of Lake Chad, is the Bodele basin. The drainage of the country is to the lake. The northern valleys are inhabited by a settled population of Gourans, known as the Daza.

A caravan route from Barca and the Kufra oasis passed through Bourku to Lake Chad. The country long remained unknown to Europeans. Gustav Nachtigal spent some time in it in the year 1871, and gave a valuable account of the region and its inhabitants in his book, Sahara and the Sudan (1879–1889). In 1899 Bourku, by agreement with Great Britain, was assigned to the French sphere of influence. The country, which had formerly been periodically raided by the Walad Sliman Arabs, was then governed by the Senussi, who had placed garrisons in the chief centres of population. From it raids were made on French territory. In 1907 a French column from Kanem entered Bourku, but after capturing Am Galakka, the principal Senussi station, retired.
