= Bokoro =

Town in Hadjer-Lamis Region, Chad

Bokoro بوكورو
- Town
- Location in Chad
- Coordinates: 12°22′42″N 17°03′24″E
- Country: Chad
- Region: Hadjer-Lamis Region
- Department: Dababa
- Elevation: 985 ft (300 m)

Population (2008)
  - Total: 15,517
- Time zone: UTC+01:00 (WAT)

Bokoro (Arabic: بوكورو) is a town in Chad. It is served by Bokoro Airport.

== Demographics ==
Year	Population
1993	10,841
2008	15,517
