= Haraze =

Haraze حراز
- Location in Chad
- Coordinates: 9°57′1″N 20°54′18″E
- Country: Chad
- Region: Salamat Region
- Department: Haraze Mangueigne Department
- Time zone: UTC+1 (WAT)

Haraze (Arabic: حراز) often known as Am Harazé or Haraze Mangueigne is a town and capital of the Haraze Mangueigne Department in the Salamat Region of eastern Chad.

== Transport ==
The town is served by Haraze Airport.
