= Iriba =

Iriba إريبا 𖺦𖻂̄𖻍𖻂𖺼𖺻
- Location of Iriba, Chad
- Coordinates: 15°7′0″N 22°15′0″E
- Country: Chad
- Region: Wadi Fira
- Department: Kobé Department
- Sub-Prefecture: Iriba
- Elevation: 3,350 ft (1,020 m)

Population (2009)
  - Total: 33,572
- Time zone: +1
- Source:citypopulation.de

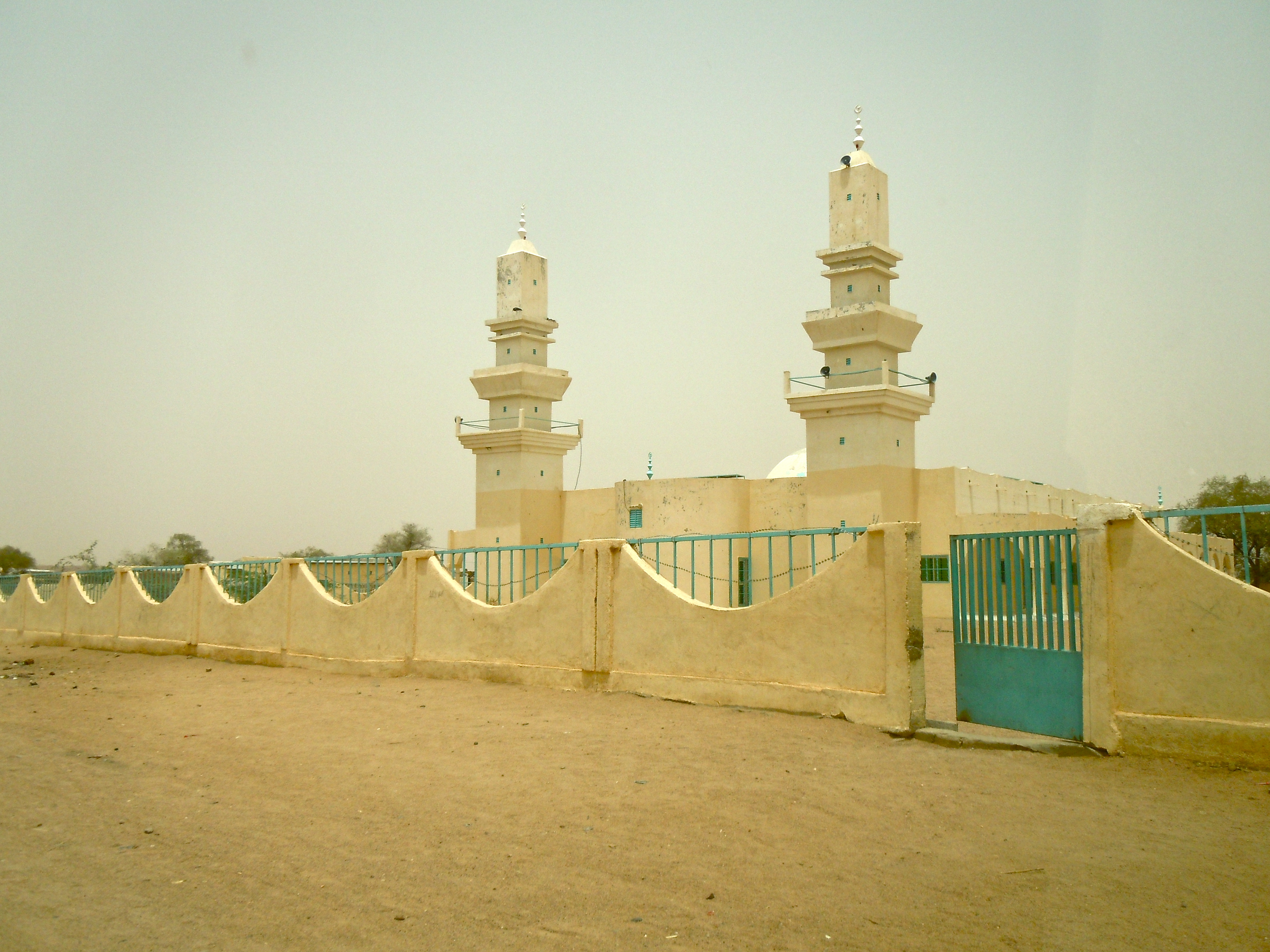
Iriba Mosque

Iriba (Arabic: هريبا; Beria: 𖺦𖻂̄𖻍𖻂𖺼𖺻) is a small town in the Wadi Fira Region of Chad. It is known as part of the Kobé Department as well as having its own prefecture and area court. It is currently being served by the Iriba Airport.

Iriba has a desert climate with two distinct periods, dry and rainy seasons. During the rainy season, considerable rainfall occurs in the area, which disappears rapidly in the seasonal rivers named "Wadi". The winters (from December to February) can be quite cold, and the summertime is extremely hot and dry, with water shortage being a chronic problem in the area.

The ethnicity of the Iriban people is referred to as "Zaghawa". The ethnic group lives on both sides of the border in Chad and Sudan, with the local language being Zaghawa, a Nilo-Saharan language. The formal languages of the area are Arabic and French. The Zaghawas have their traditional leadership, under the Sultan of Zaghawa.

A large number of the refugees fled from the Darfur area to the general vicinity of Iriba in the year 2004. The refugees are mainly from the same ethnicity and live in three large refugee camps in the area; namely Iridimi, Touloum, and Amnabak. The three camps accommodate over sixty thousand refugees. The refugee influx required extensive international presence for assistance and protection of the displaced population. UNHCR is the leading international agency in the area while WFP and many other NGOs help with the different aspects of life for the refugees.
