= Moussoro =

Moussoro موسورو Moussu
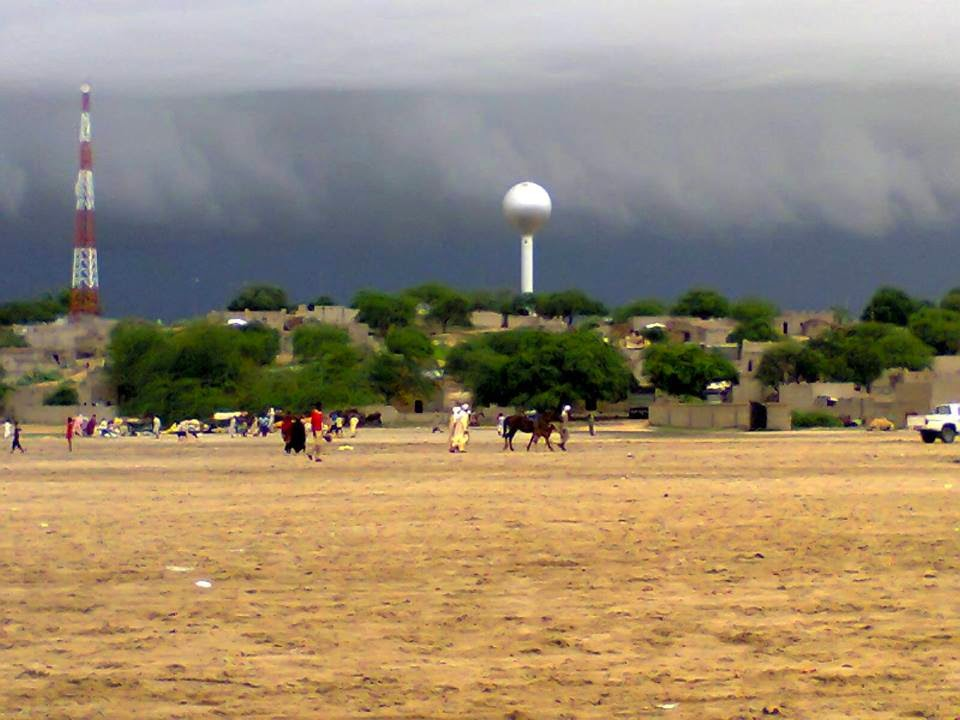

- Location in Chad
- Coordinates: 13°38′35″N 16°29′31″E
- Country: Chad
- Region: Barh El Gazel
- Department: Barh El Gazel Sud
- Sub-prefecture: Moussoro

Population (2012)
  - Total: 75,210
- Time zone: +1

Moussoro (Arabic: موسورو) is a town in Chad, lying 300 km (190 mi) northeast of N'Djamena on the road to Faya-Largeau. An important transportation centre, it lies in a dry river bed and as a result has more vegetation than is typical in the area.

Moussoro is the capital of the region of Barh El Gazel (Bahr el Gazel). The town is served by Moussoro Airport. Moussoro is inhabited by Gouran Kreda/Karra ethnic group of northern Chad. It serves as their commercial and administrative town. Moussoro market day is Thursday. The area is mostly known for its agricultural activity.

Moussoro have the second president's residence in Chad after the main Residence in N'Djamena (see image below). The town is also the main area for army training in Chad.

== Gallery ==
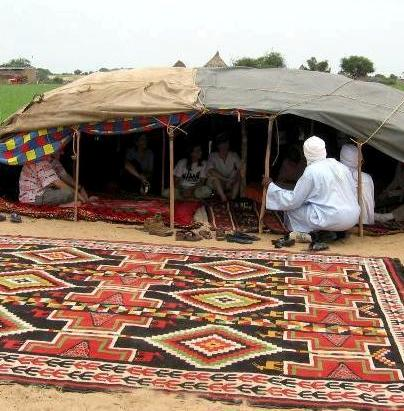
Nomadic tent near Moussoro (2012 photograph)

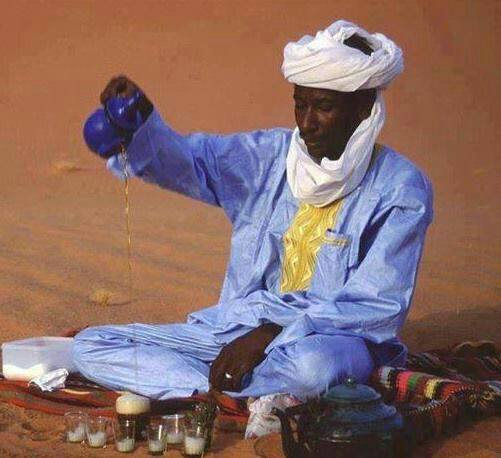
Man pouring tea (2015)

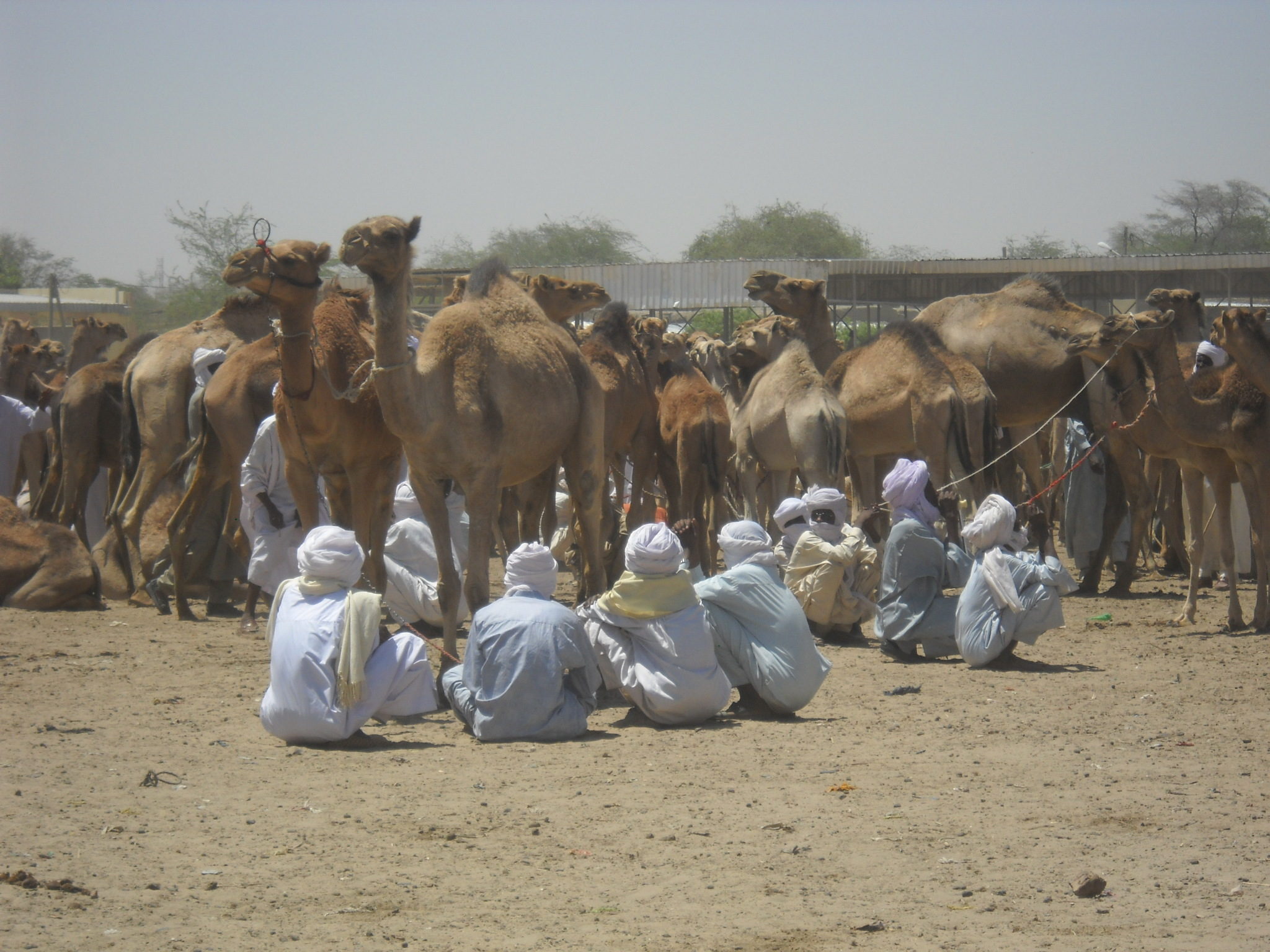
Weekly camel market (March 2011)
