= Koukou Angarana =

Koukou Angarana كوكو أنغرانا
- Location in Chad
- Coordinates: 12°01′N 21°41′E
- Country: Chad
- Region: Sila (Dar Sila)
- Department: Kimiti
- Time zone: UTC+1 (WAT)

Koukou Angarana (Arabic: كوكو أنغرانا) is a town in the Kimiti department of the Sila (or Dar Sila) region in southeastern Chad.

Prior to 2008, Koukou Angarana was part of the Ouaddaï Region.

== Transport ==
The town is served by Koukou Angarana Airstrip. Landcruisers are also available for hire. However, road transport is risky and requires local police escort. The roads are also rugged and untarmacked.
