= Ati, Chad =

Regional capital of Batha, Chad

- City
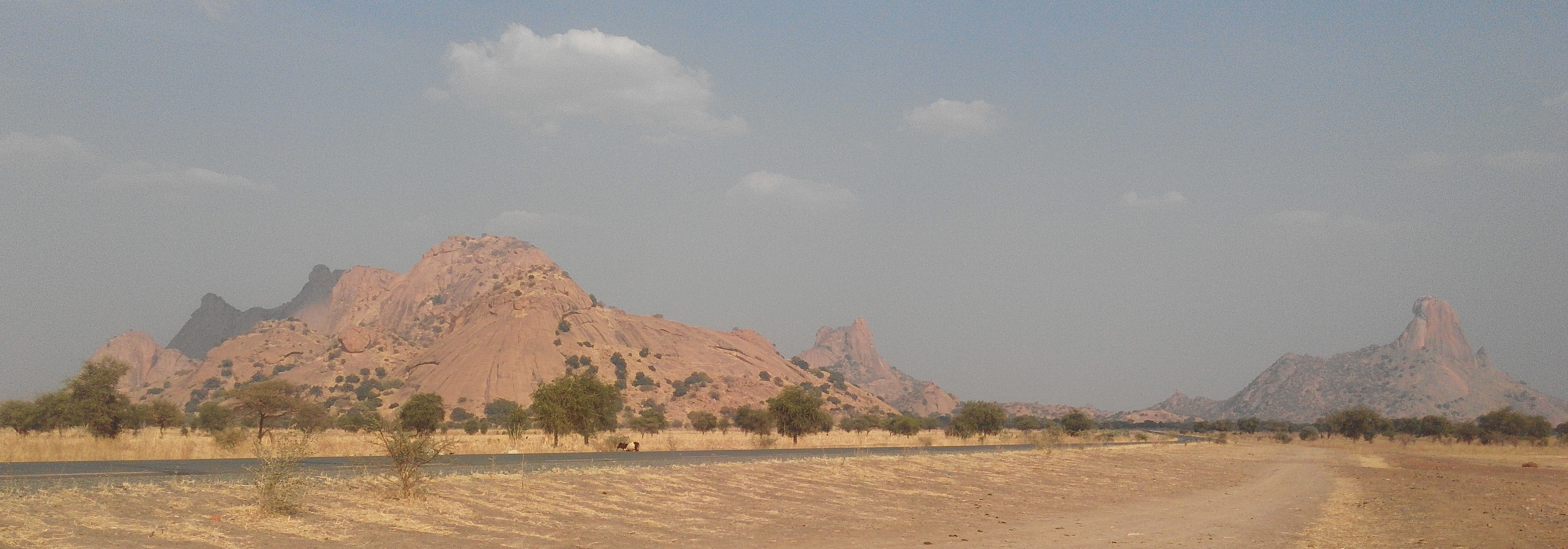

- Location in Chad
- Coordinates: 13°12′48″N 18°20′17″E
- Country: Chad
- Region: Batha
- Department: Batha Ouest
- Sub-Prefecture: Ati
- Elevation: 294 m (965 ft)

Population (2012)
  - Total: 35,311
- Time zone: UTC+01:00 (WAT)

Ati (Arabic: أتي) is a city in Chad, the capital of the region of Batha. It lies 278 miles (447 km) by road east of the capital N'Djamena. The town is served by Ati Airport.

== Demographics ==
Year	Population
1993	17,727
2007	25,166

== Notable people ==
- Fatimé Dordji - Chad's first female radio announcer
