= Wadi Fira (region) =

Region of Chad

Wadi Fira وادي فيرا Wādī Fīrā
- Province
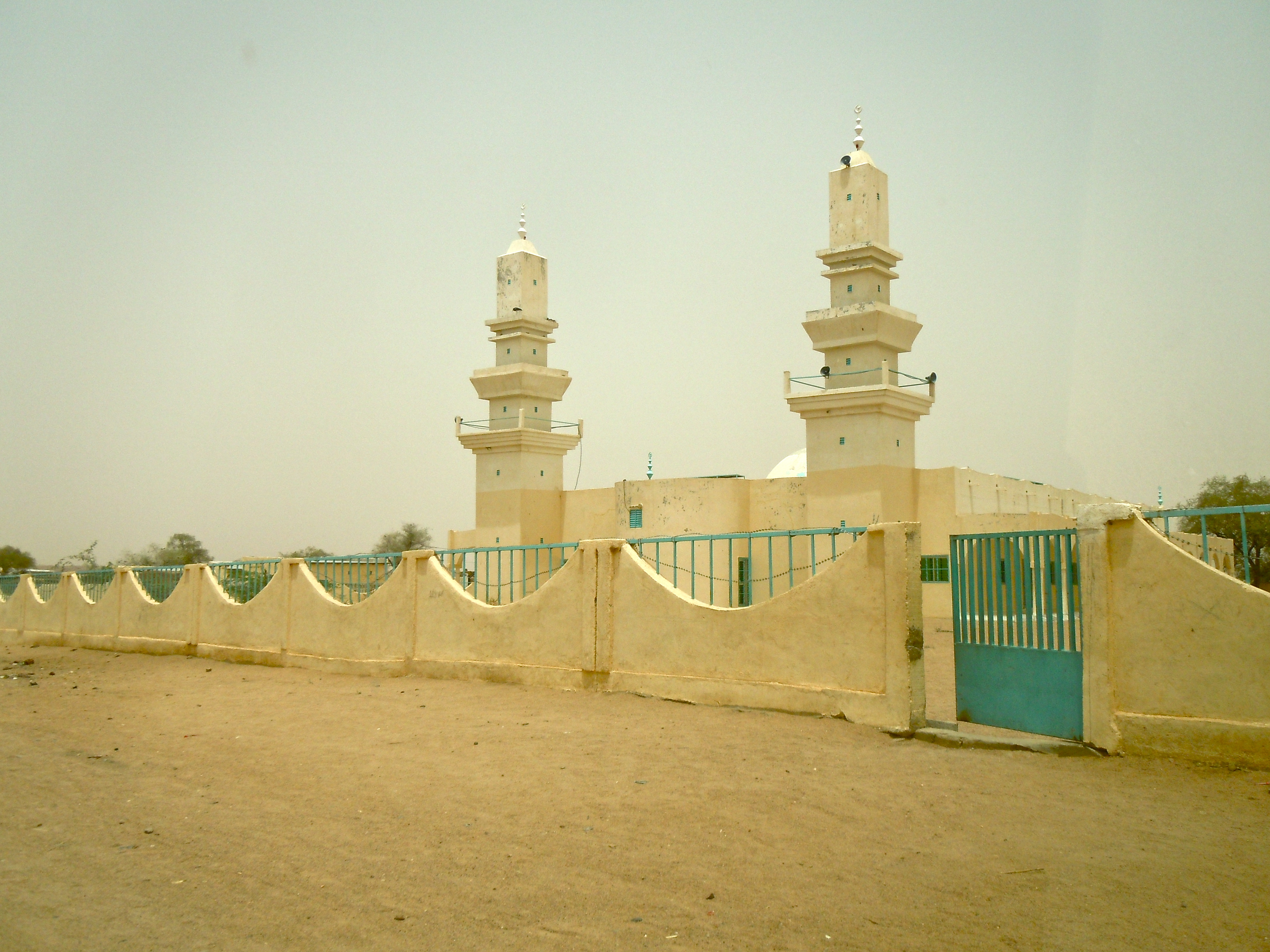
- Great Mosque of Iriba

- Map of Chad showing Wadi Fira.
- Coordinates: 14°31′39″N 20°55′36″E
- Country: Chad
- Departments: 3
- Sub-prefectures: 10
- Region as of: 2002
- Provincial capital: Biltine

Government
  - Gouverneur: Ahmadou Ahidjo N'Garo (2010)

Population (2009)
  - Total: 508,383
- Time zone: UTC+01:00 (WAT)
- ISO 3166 code: TD-WF

Wadi Fira (Arabic: وادي فيرا, romanised: Wādī Fīrā) is one of the 23 provinces of Chad. Its capital is the town of Biltine. The province corresponds with the former prefecture of Biltine.

== Geography ==
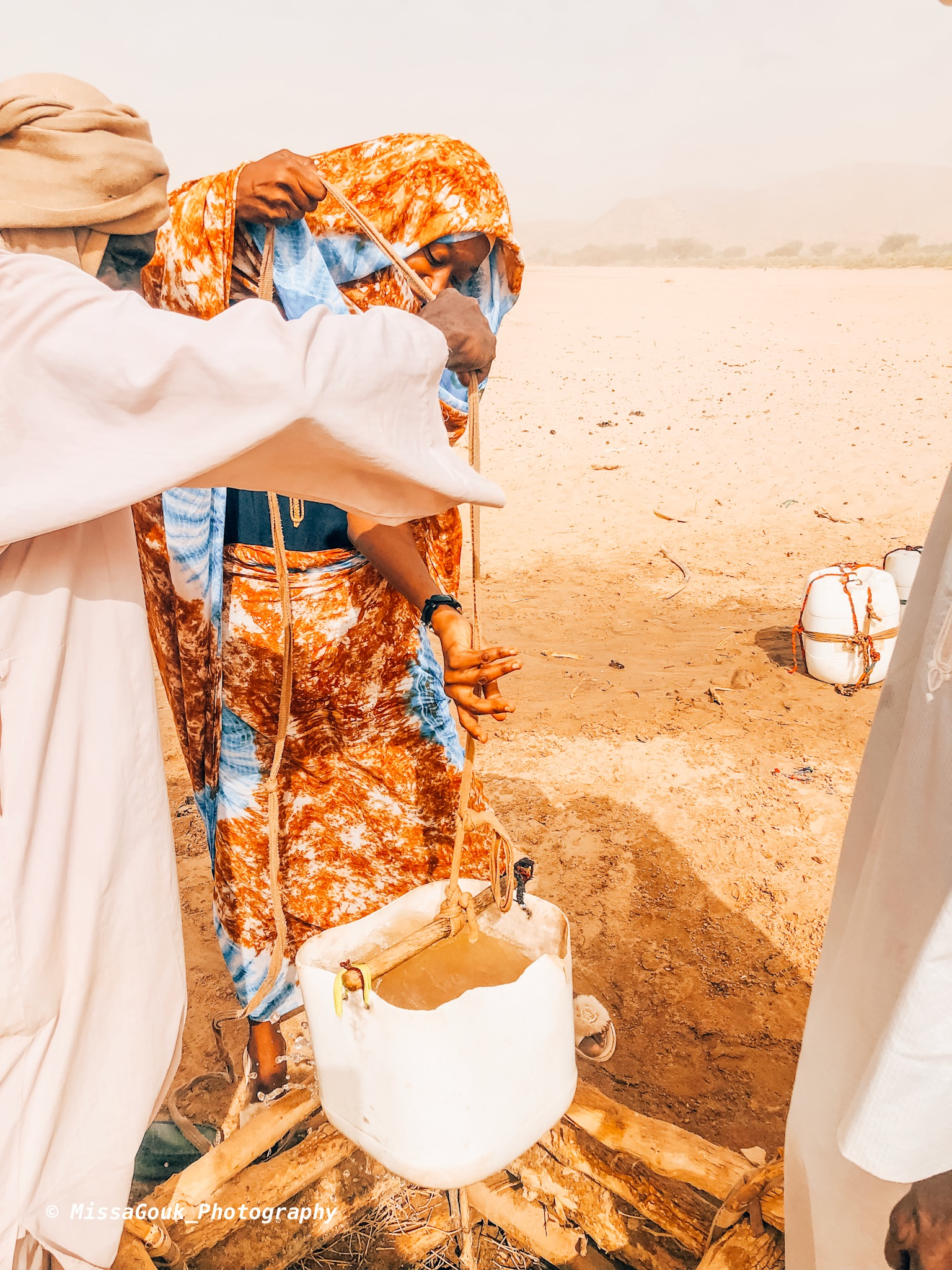
Water scarcity.

The province borders Borkou Region, Ennedi-Ouest Region and Ennedi-Est Region to the north, Sudan to the east, Ouaddaï Region to the south, and Batha Region to the west. The terrain is savanna, merging into the Sahara Desert in the north, and rising to the east.

=== Settlements ===
Biltine is the province's capital; other major settlements include Guéréda, Iriba and Matadjana.

== Demographics ==
As per the 2009 Chadian census, Wadi Fira's population is 508,383. The main ethnolinguistic groups are the Amdang, Baggara (generally speakers of Chadian Arabic), Maba, Mararit, Tama and Zaghawa.

== Subdivisions ==
The province of Wadi Fira is divided into three departments, each listed with the name of its capital or main town (chef-lieu in French) and a list of sub-prefectures (sous-préfectures).

Department	Capital (chef-lieu)	Sub-prefectures
Biltine	Biltine	Am Zoer, Arada, Biltine, Mata
Dar Tama	Guéréda	Guéréda, Kolonga, Sirim Birke
Kobé	Iriba	Iriba, Matadjana, Tiné Djagaraba
