= Bahr el Gazel (province of Chad) =

Province of Chad

بحر الغزال Barh El Gazel: منطقة بحر الغزال (Arabic); Province du Barh El Gazel (French); Barh El Gazal Bahr el Gazel
- Province
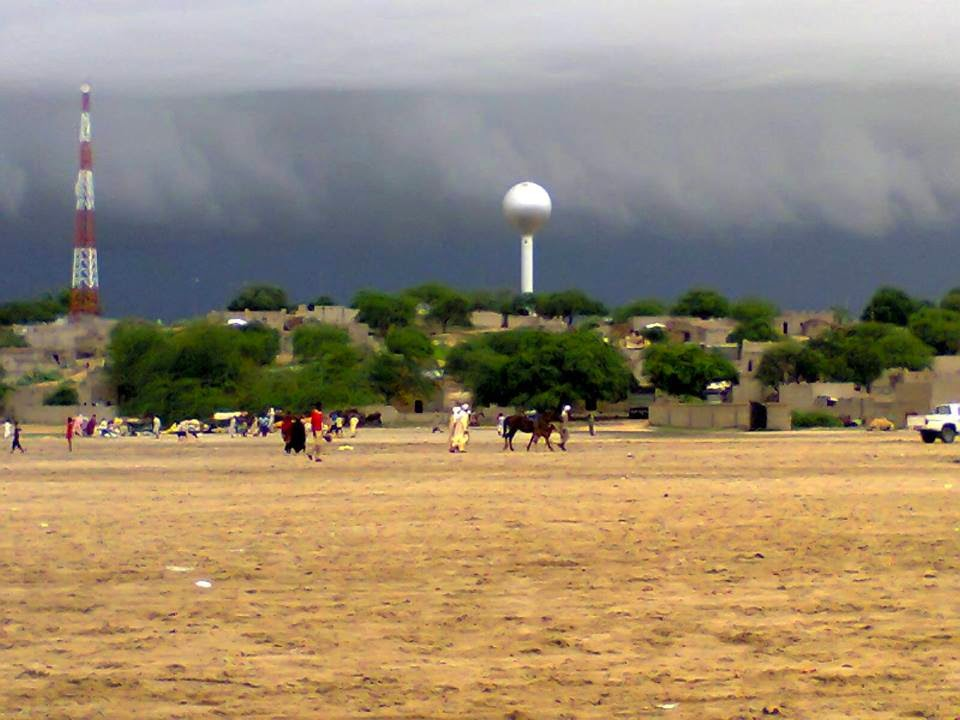
- Moussoro, the capital of Bahr el Gazel

- Map of Chad showing Barh El Gazel.
- Coordinates: 13°38′35″N 16°29′31″E
- Country: Chad
- Departments: 2
- Sub-prefectures: 7
- Region as of: 2008
- Provincial capital: Moussoro

Government
  - Gouverneur: Mahamat Nasser Hassan (2010)

Population (2009)
  - Total: 260,865
- Time zone: UTC+01:00 (WAT)
- ISO 3166 code: TD-BG

Barh El Gazel (Arabic: منطقة بحر الغزال, French: Province du Barh El Gazel) is one of the 23 provinces of Chad. The province's name may also be written as Barh El Gazal or Bahr el Gazel. Its capital is the town of Moussoro.

The province was created in 2008 from the former Barh El Gazel Department of the Kanem Region. On 10 August 2018, a new ordinance (Note: Ordinance No. 038/PR/2018) divided Chad into 23 provinces, 107 departments, and 377 communes. The names of the former regions remained the same but were now called provinces.

== Geography ==
The province borders Borkou Region to the north, Batha Region to the east, Hadjer-Lamis Region to the south, and Kanem Region to the west. The province is predominantly grassland, merging into the Sahara Desert in the north.

=== Settlements ===
Moussoro is the provincial capital; other major settlements include Chadra, Dourgoulanga, Michemiré, Toumia, Mandjoura, Islet, and Salal.

== Demographics ==
As per the census of 2009, the population of the province was 260,865, 46.3% female. The average size of household as of 2009 is 5.90: 5.90 in rural households and 5.80 in urban areas. The total number of households was 43,478: 38,160 in rural areas and 5,318 in urban areas. The number of nomads in the region was 126,855, 32.7% of the population. There were 257,804 people residing in private households. There were 111,278 above 18 years of age: 56,407 male and 54,871 female. The sex ratio was 116.00 females for every 100 males. There were 134,010 sedentary staff, 1.20 of the total population.

The main ethnolinguistic groups are the Dazaga Toubou and the Kanembu.

== Local administration ==
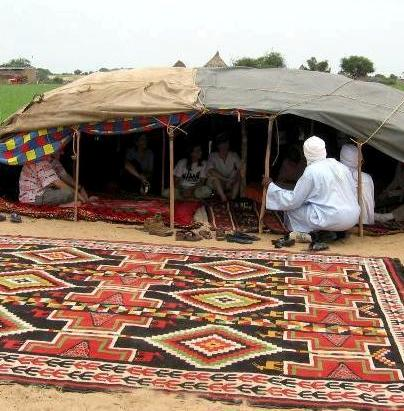
Nomads in the region

As a part of decentralization in February 2003, the country was administratively split into regions, departments, municipalities and rural communities. The prefectures which were originally 14 in number were re-designated in 17 regions. The regions were administered by Governors appointed by the President. The Prefects, who originally held the responsibility of the 14 prefectures, still retained their titles and were responsible for the administration of smaller departments in each region. The members of local assemblies are elected every six years, while the executive organs are elected every three years. As of 2016, there were 23 regions in Chad, which were divided based on population and administrative convenience. On 10 August 2018, a new ordinance (Note: Ordinance No. 038/PR/2018) divided Chad into 23 provinces, 107 departments, and 377 communes. The names of the former regions remained the same but were now called provinces.

Created in 2008 from the Kanem region's former Barh El Gazel department.

Department	Pop. 2009	Capital	Sub-prefectures
Bahr el Gazel Nord	64,822	Salal	Dourgoulanga, Mandjoura, Salal
Bahr El Gazel Sud	196,043	Moussoro	Amsilep, Chadra, Michemiré, Moussoro

== See also ==
- 2010 Sahel famine
- Sahel drought
