= Doba, Chad =

Doba دوبا
- City
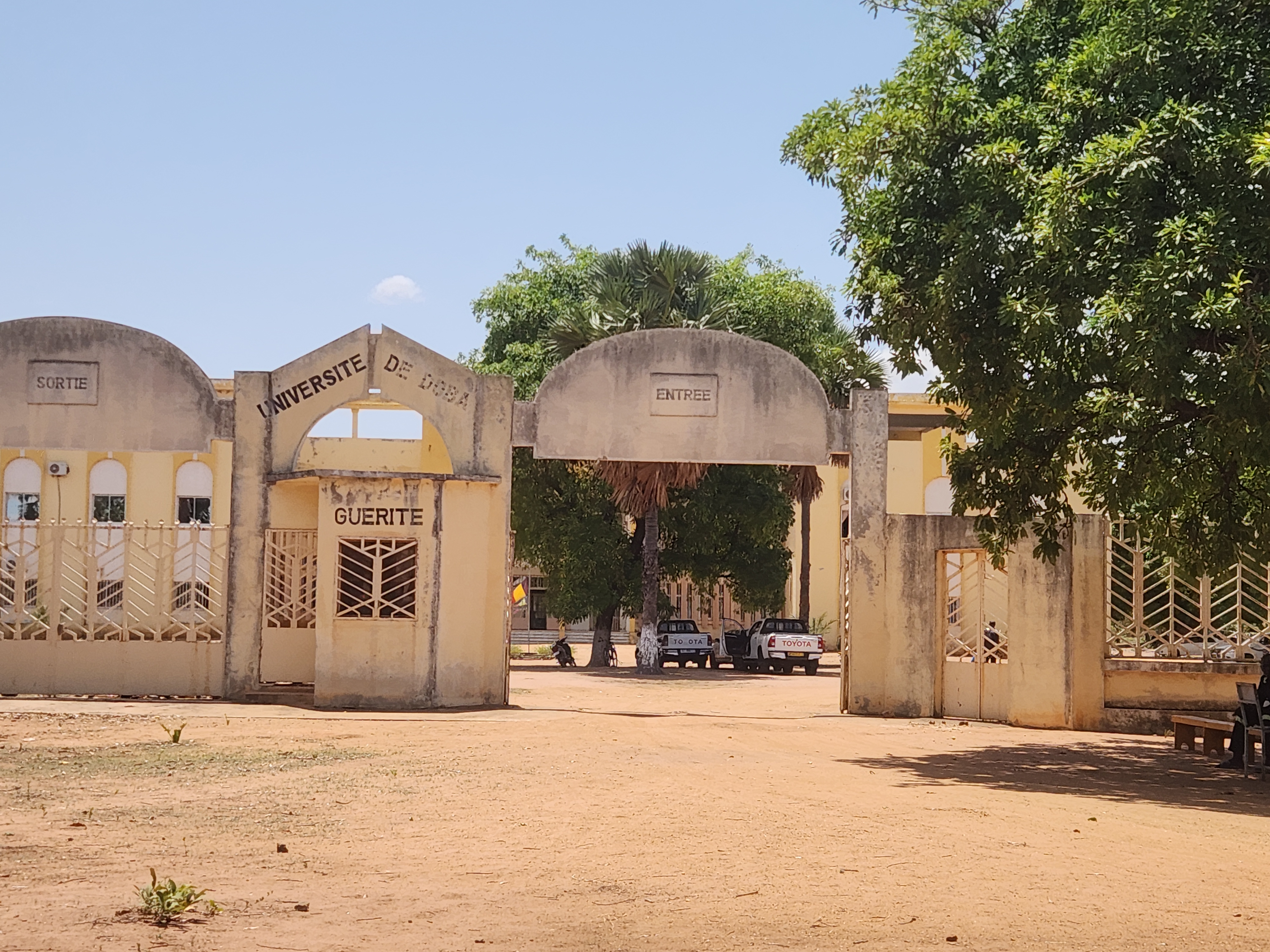
- University of Doba

- Location in Chad
- Coordinates: 8°39′36″N 16°51′0″E
- Country: Chad
- Region: Logone Oriental region
- Department: La Syria
- Sub-Prefecture: ali Doba
- Elevation: 1,279 ft (390 m)

Population (2008)
  - Total: 25,650
- Time zone: UTC+01:00 (WAT)

Doba (Arabic: دوبا) is a city in Chad, the capital of the region of Logone Oriental.

Exploitation of oil resources in the vicinity of Doba is expected to produce economic benefits.

The town is served by Doba Airport.

== Demographics ==
| Year | Population |
|---|---|
| 1993 | 17 920 |
| 2008 | 25 650 |

== Notable people ==
- Grace Kodindo (born 1960) - obstetrician
- Marius Mouandilmadji (born 1998) - footballer
