= Faya-Largeau =

Faya-Largeau فايا لارجو
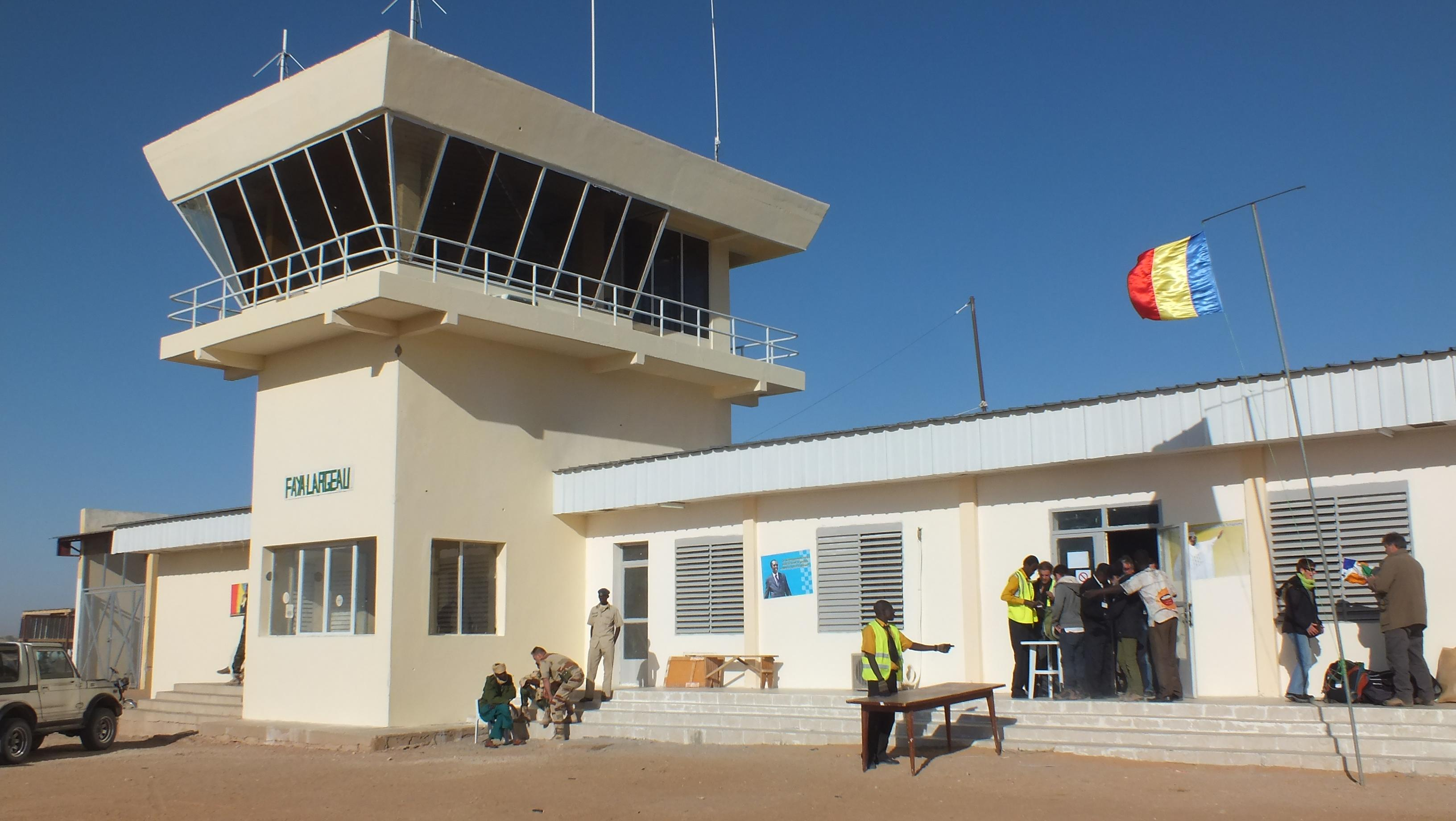
- Faya-Largeau Airport

- Location in Chad
- Coordinates: 17°55′01″N 19°7′0″E
- Country: Chad
- Region: Borkou (since 2008)
- Department: Borkou
- Sub-Prefecture: Faya-Largeau
- Elevation: 245 m (804 ft)

Population (2012)
  - Total: 48,090
- Time zone: +1

Faya-Largeau (also known as Faya, Arabic: فايا لارجو or فايا) is the largest city in northern Chad and was the capital of the region of Bourkou-Ennedi-Tibesti. It is now in the Borkou Region, which was formed in 2008 from the Borkou Department of the former Bourkou-Ennedi-Tibesti region.

== History ==
Originally called Faya, the town was renamed Largeau after French Colonel Victor Emmanuel Largeau; upon Chadian independence from France, it assumed the name Faya-Largeau. The town was captured by Libya when Libya annexed the Aouzou Strip in 1975, but was retaken by Hissène Habré's forces in 1980. Libya recaptured Faya-Largeau in 1983, but retreated in 1987 during the so-called Toyota War.

== Economy ==
Due to the considerable underground water supply in the town, the main economic activities are agriculture and natron mining. The town is serviced by Faya-Largeau Airport (IATA: FYT, ICAO: FTTY) with a paved runway, used almost exclusively by military airplanes.

== Demographics ==
Year	Population
1993	9,867
2008	14,123

== Climate ==
Faya-Largeau has a hot desert climate typical of the Borkou Region lying on the heart of the Sahara Desert. Average maximum temperatures in Faya-Largeau are consistently over 39 °C (102.2 °F) from April to September, reaching a maximum of 42.1 °C (107.8 °F) in June. The coolest months are December and January with an average maximum temperature of 26.4 °C (79.5 °F). Annual precipitation averages only 11.7 millimetres (0.46 in) and generally only occurs from June to September, although some years have no rainfall at all. The sunshine duration is one of the highest found in the world with some 3,800 hours of bright sunshine annually, and every month receives an average sunshine duration above 290 hours.

Climate data for Faya-Largeau (1961–1990)
Month	Jan	Feb	Mar	Apr	May	Jun	Jul	Aug	Sep	Oct	Nov	Dec	Year
Record high °C (°F)	39 (102)	43 (109)	44 (111)	49 (120)	49 (120)	49 (120)	47 (117)	46 (115)	46 (115)	47 (117)	39 (102)	36 (97)	49 (120)
Mean daily maximum °C (°F)	26.4 (79.5)	29.4 (84.9)	33.6 (92.5)	39.1 (102.4)	41.0 (105.8)	42.1 (107.8)	41.0 (105.8)	40.2 (104.4)	39.8 (103.6)	36.5 (97.7)	31.1 (88.0)	27.6 (81.7)	35.7 (96.3)
Daily mean °C (°F)	20.0 (68.0)	22.2 (72.0)	26.0 (78.8)	30.8 (87.4)	33.0 (91.4)	34.1 (93.4)	33.4 (92.1)	33.1 (91.6)	32.7 (90.9)	29.5 (85.1)	24.5 (76.1)	21.0 (69.8)	28.4 (83.1)
Mean daily minimum °C (°F)	13.6 (56.5)	15.0 (59.0)	18.4 (65.1)	22.4 (72.3)	25.0 (77.0)	26.1 (79.0)	25.8 (78.4)	26.0 (78.8)	25.9 (78.6)	22.5 (72.5)	17.9 (64.2)	14.4 (57.9)	21.1 (70.0)
Record low °C (°F)	4 (39)	7 (45)	11 (52)	14 (57)	17 (63)	17 (63)	16 (61)	16 (61)	17 (63)	12 (54)	9 (48)	3 (37)	3 (37)
Average rainfall mm (inches)	0.0 (0.0)	0.0 (0.0)	0.0 (0.0)	0.1 (0.00)	0.4 (0.02)	0.3 (0.01)	3.0 (0.12)	7.0 (0.28)	0.8 (0.03)	0.1 (0.00)	0.0 (0.0)	0.0 (0.0)	11.7 (0.46)
Average rainy days (≥ 0.1 mm)	0	0	0	1	1	1	2	3	1	1	0	0	10
Average relative humidity (%)	25	20	18	18	17	20	27	33	22	25	23	25	23
Mean monthly sunshine hours	306.9	291.2	306.9	309.0	344.1	333.0	334.8	319.3	312.0	319.3	309.0	306.9	3,792.4
Mean daily sunshine hours	9.9	10.4	9.9	10.3	11.1	11.1	10.8	10.3	10.4	10.3	10.3	9.9	10.4
Source 1: World Meteorological Organization (temperatures and precipitation days)
Source 2: NOAA (sun and humidity), Annales de Géographie

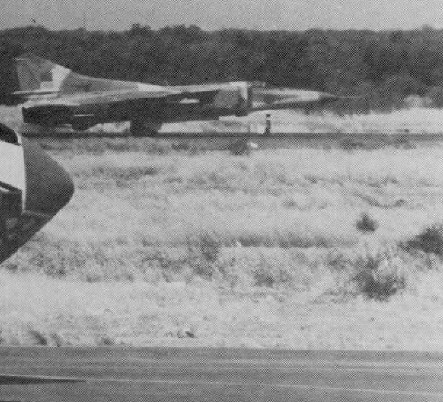
LARAF MiG-23MS with empty missile rails rolling along the runway at Faya Largeau AB, some time in the mid-1980s. Also note the radome of an Il-76MD in the foreground left. Faya Largeau was the main Libyan base in northern Chad until the building of Ouadi Doum.

== Notable people ==
- Idriss Ndélé Moussa, dentist, academic, and politician

== See also ==
- Chadian–Libyan conflict
