= Salamat (region) =

Province of Chad

Coordinates: 11°02′24″N 20°17′01″E

Salamat سلامات Salāmāt
- Province
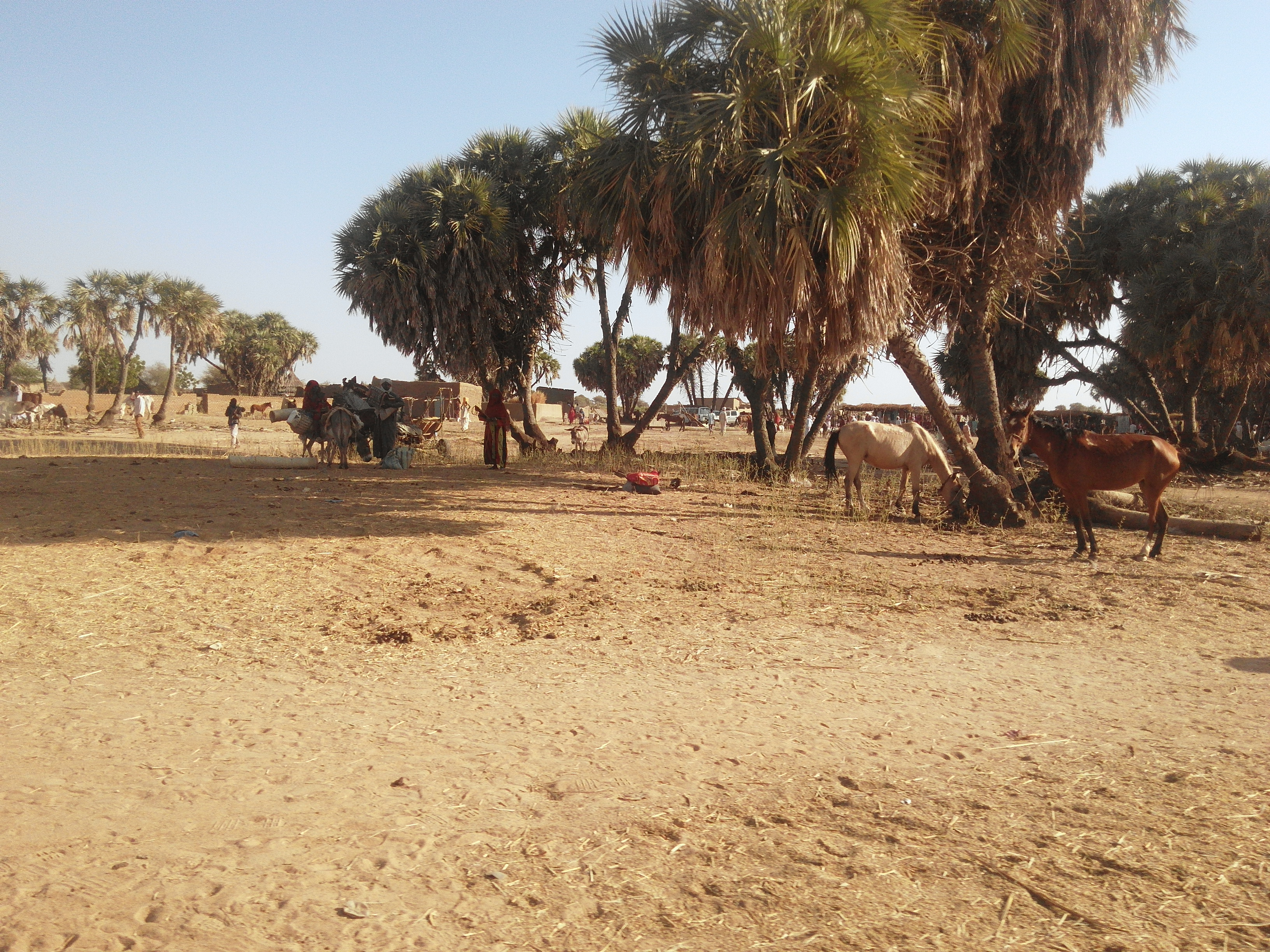
- Open-air market near Am Timan

- Map of Chad showing Salamat.
- Country: Chad
- Departments: 3
- Sub-prefectures: 9
- Provincial capital: Am Timan

Population (2009)
  - Total: 302,301
- Time zone: UTC+01:00 (WAT)

Salamat (Arabic: سلامات, romanised: Salāmāt) is one of the 23 provinces of Chad, located in the south-east of the country. The region's capital is Am Timan. It corresponds to the former prefecture of the same name.

== Geography ==
Salamat borders Sila Region to the north, the Central African Republic to the south-east, and Moyen-Chari Region and Guéra Region to the west and north-west. The terrain is generally flat savannah. Half of the Zakouma National Park lies in the province.

=== Settlements ===
Am Timan is the province's capital; other major settlements include Abgué, Abou-Deïa, Am Habilé, Djouna, Haraze, Mangueigne and Mouraye.

== Demographics ==
As per the 2009 Chadian census, the population of Salamat is 302,301. The main ethnolinguistic groups are Arab groups such as the Baggara (generally speakers of Chadian Arabic), Birgit, Gula groups such as the Gula Iro and Bon Gula, Jonkor Bourmataguil, Kibet, Runga and Toram.

== Economy ==
Salamat's economy is based on subsistence agriculture, fishery and cotton. Salamat has been described as the "poorest regions in the world" by the World Bank, International Monetary Fund, and other sources. There is a limited amount of tourism activity related to Zakouma National Park.

== Subdivisions ==
The province of Salamat is divided into three departments:

Department	Capital	Sub-prefectures
Aboudeïa	Aboudeïa	Aboudeïa, Abgué, Am Habilé
Barh Azoum	Am Timan	Am Timan, Djouna, Mouraye
Haraze-Mangueigne	Haraze	Haraze, Mangueigne, Daha
