= Sexual violence =

Sexual act or attempt to obtain a sexual act by violence or coercion

Sexual violence is any harmful or unwanted sexual act, an attempt to obtain a sexual act through violence or coercion, or an act directed against a person's sexuality without their consent, by any individual, regardless of their relationship to the victim. This includes forced engagement in sexual acts, attempted or completed, and may be physical, psychological, or verbal. It occurs in times of peace and armed conflict situations, is widespread, and is considered to be one of the most traumatic, pervasive, and most common human rights violations.

Sexual violence is a serious public health problem and has profound short- and long-term physical and mental health impacts such as increased risks of sexual and reproductive health problems, suicide, and HIV infection. Murder occurring either during a sexual assault or as a result of an honor killing in response to a sexual assault is also a factor of sexual violence. Though women and girls suffer disproportionately from these aspects, sexual violence can occur to anybody at any age; it is an act of violence that can be perpetrated by parents, caregivers, acquaintances and strangers, as well as intimate partners. It is rarely a crime of passion, and is rather an aggressive act that frequently aims to express power and dominance over the victim.

Sexual violence remains highly stigmatized in all settings, oftentimes dismissed as a women's issue, thus levels of disclosure of the assault vary between regions. In general, it is a widely underreported phenomenon, thus available data tend to underestimate the true scale of the problem. In addition, sexual violence is also a neglected area of research, thus deeper understanding of the issue is imperative in order to promote a coordinated movement against it. Domestic sexual violence is distinguished from conflict-related sexual violence. Often, people who coerce their spouses into sexual acts believe their actions are legitimate because they are married. In times of conflict, sexual violence tends to be an inevitable repercussion of warfare trapped in an ongoing cycle of impunity. Rape of women and of men is often used as a method of warfare (war rape), as a form of attack on the enemy, typifying the conquest and degradation of its women or men or captured male or female fighters. Even if strongly prohibited by international human rights law, customary law and international humanitarian law, enforcement mechanisms are still fragile or even non-existent in many corners of the world.

From a historical perspective, sexual violence was considered as only being perpetrated by men against women and as being commonplace and "normal" during both war and peace times from the Ancient Greeks to the 20th century. This led to the negligence of any indications of what the methods, aims and magnitude of such violence was. It took until the end of the 20th century for sexual violence to no longer be considered a minor issue and to gradually become criminalized. Sexual violence is still used in modern warfare as recently as in the Rwandan genocide and in the Gaza war, targeting both Israelis and Palestinians.

== Definitions ==
=== General ===
The World Health Organization (WHO) in its 2002 World Report on Violence and Health defined sexual violence as: "any sexual act, attempt to obtain a sexual act, unwanted sexual comments or advances, or acts to traffic, or otherwise directed, against a person's sexuality using coercion, by any person regardless of their relationship to the victim, in any setting, including but not limited to home and work". WHO's definition of sexual violence includes but is not limited to rape, which is defined as physically forced or otherwise coerced penetration of the vulva or anus, using a penis, other body parts or an object. Sexual violence consists in a purposeful action of which the intention is often to inflict severe humiliation on the victims and diminish human dignity. In the case where others are forced to watch acts of sexual violence, such acts aim at intimidating the larger community.

Other acts incorporated in sexual violence are various forms of sexual assaults, such as forced contact between mouth and penis, vulva or anus. Sexual violence can include coerced contact between the mouth and penis, vulva or anus, or acts that do not involve physical contact between the victim and the perpetrator—for example, sexual harassment, threats, and peeping.

Coercion, with regard to sexual violence, can cover a whole spectrum of degrees of force. Apart from physical force, it may involve psychological intimidation, blackmail or other threats – for instance, the threat of physical harm, of being dismissed from a job or of not obtaining a job that is sought. It may also occur when the person being attacked is unable to give consent – for instance, while drunk, drugged, asleep or mentally incapable of understanding the situation.

Such broader definitions of sexual violence are found within international law. The Rome Statute of the International Criminal Court (ICC) has established in article 7(1)(g) that "rape, sexual slavery, enforced prostitution, forced pregnancy, enforced sterilization, or any other form of sexual violence of comparable gravity" constitutes a crime against humanity. Sexual violence is further explained in the ICC's Elements of Crimes, which the Court uses in its interpretation and application of Article 7. The Elements of Crime establishes that sexual violence is:

An act of sexual nature against one or more persons or caused such person or persons to engage in an act of sexual nature by force, or by threat of force or coercion, such as that caused by fear of violence, duress, detention, psychological oppression or abuse of power, against such person or persons or another person, or by taking advantage of a coercive environment or such person's or persons' incapacity to give genuine consent.

The United Nations Special Rapporteur on systemic rape sexual slavery and slavery-like practices during armed conflict, in a report in 1998, stipulated that sexual violence is "any violence, physical or psychological, carried out through sexual means by targeting sexuality". This definition encompasses physical as well as psychological attacks aimed at "a person's sexual characteristics, such as forcing a person to strip naked in public, mutilating a person's genitals, or slicing off a woman's breasts". The Special Rapporteur's definition also refers to situations "in which two victims are forced to perform sexual acts on one another or to harm one another in a sexual manner".

The WHO lists a number of examples of circumstances that sexual violence can be committed:

- Systematic rape during armed conflict
- Rape within marriage or dating relationships
- Rape by strangers
- Unwanted sexual advances or sexual harassment, including demanding sex in return for favors
- Sexual abuse of mentally or physically disabled people
- Sexual abuse of children
- Forced marriage or cohabitation, including the marriage of children
- Denial of the right to use contraception or to adopt other measures to protect against sexually transmitted infections
- Forced abortion
- Violent acts against the sexual integrity of women, including female genital mutilation and obligatory inspection for virginity
- Forced prostitution and trafficking of people for the purpose of sexual exploitation

A thorough definition is necessary in monitoring the prevalence of sexual violence and studying trends over time. In addition, a consistent definition helps in determining the magnitude of sexual violence and aids in comparing the problem across demographics. Consistency allows researchers to measure risk and protective factors for victimization in a uniform manner. This ultimately informs prevention and intervention efforts.

=== Conflict-related and domestic sexual violence ===
A distinction is made between conflict-related sexual violence and domestic sexual violence:

- Conflict-related sexual violence is sexual violence perpetrated by combatants, including rebels, militants, militias, and government forces. The various forms of sexual violence can be used systematically in conflicts "to torture, injure, extract information, degrade, threaten, intimidate or punish". Sexual violence can in such cases amount to being a weapon of war.
- Domestic sexual violence is sexual violence perpetrated by intimate partners and by other family/household members, and is often termed intimate partner violence. This kind of sexual violence is widespread both during conflict and in peacetime. It is commonly believed that incidents of domestic sexual violence increase in wartime and in post-conflict environments.

== Victims ==
=== Spectrum ===
All people can fall victim to sexual violence. This includes women, men, and people who define themselves in other terms, e.g., transgender or non-binary individuals.

Most research, reports and studies focus on sexual violence perpetrated against women and in armed conflicts. The majority of victims are women, but men and children are also victims of sexual violence. The crime may be committed in peacetime or during conflict.

It is possible for individuals to be targeted based on sexual orientation or gender-exhibiting behaviour. Such attacks, which are often called "corrective rapes" have been performed to conform an individual to a heterosexual orientation or to more accepted notions of behaviour for the perceived gender of the victim; asexual individuals are also particularly targeted.

=== Domestic sexual violence ===
Domestic sexual violence includes all forms of unwanted sexual activity. It is considered abuse even if the victim may have previously engaged in consensual sexual activities with the perpetrator. Men and women can both fall victim to this type of abuse although women are more often the victims than men, and men perpetrate more often than women. Moreover, lesbian, bisexual, and trans women are more likely than cis and heterosexual women to experience intimate partner violence, which includes sexual violence.

A 2006 WHO study on physical and sexual domestic violence against women conducted across ten countries found that the prevalence of domestic sexual violence ranged, on average, between 10% and 40%. Domestic sexual violence is also considerably less common than other forms of domestic violence. The variations in the findings across and within countries suggest that this type of abuse is not inevitable and can be prevented.

=== Women ===
Sexual violence against women and girls can take many forms and is carried out in different situations and contexts. Women comprise the great majority of victims of sexual violence and live with the possibility of falling victim in common life situations. For instance, a 1987 study concluded that college women reported being the victims of unwanted sex that was the result of men using verbal coercion and physical force to manipulate them into it, and alcohol or drugs to intoxicate them into it.

Sexual violence is one of the most common and widespread violations that men subject women to during wartime. It also figures among the most traumatic experiences, both emotionally and psychologically, women suffer during conflict. Sexual violence, in particular rape, is often considered as a method of warfare: it is used not only to "torture, injure, extract information, degrade, displace, intimidate, punish or simply destroy", but also as a strategy to destabilize communities and demoralize other men. The use of sexual violence as a weapon of war was widespread conflicts such as Rwanda, Sudan, Sierra Leone, and Kosovo. The perpetrators of female-directed violence in times of conflict are often armed groups and local men.

Sexual violence can also be caused by the consequences of purity cultures, in which sexual activity is associated with impurity and sin.

=== Men ===
As with sexual violence against women, sexual violence against men can take different forms, and occur in any kind of context, including at home or in the workplace, in prisons and police custody, and during war and in the military. The practice of sexually assaulting males is not confined to any geographical area of the world or its place of commission, and occurs irrespective of the victim's age. The various forms of sexual violence directed against males include rape, enforced sterilization, enforced masturbation, and genital violence (including genital mutilation). In addition to the physical pain caused, sexual violence against men can also exploit local ideas of gender and sexuality to cause tremendous mental and psychological anguish for survivors that can last for years following the attack.

Male-directed sexual violence is more significant than is often thought. The scope of such crimes continues, however, to be unknown largely because of poor or a lack of documentation. The under- or non-reporting of sexual violence against males may often be due to fear, confusion, guilt, shame and stigma, or a combination thereof. Moreover, men may be reluctant to talk about being victim of crimes of sexual violence. In this regard, the way in which societies construct the notion of masculinity plays a role. Masculinity and victimization may be considered incompatible, in particular in societies where masculinity is equated with the ability to exert power, leading to non-reporting. The incompatibility between the conventional understanding of masculinity and victimization can arise both with regard to the attack itself and when coping with the consequences of such crimes. Because of under- and non-reporting on sexual violence against men, the little evidence that exists tends to be anecdotal.

In the case that sexual violence against males is recognized and reported, it is often categorized as "abuse" or "torture". This is considered a tendency to hide sexual assaults directed at men as something else, and it is believed to contribute to the poor- or lack of reporting of such crimes, and can arise from the belief that sexual violence is a women's issue and that men cannot be victims of sexual assaults.

=== Children ===
Sexual violence against children is a form of child abuse. It includes harassment and rape, as well as the use of children in prostitution or pornography.

Sexual violence is a serious infringement upon a child's rights, and one which can result in significant physical and psychological trauma to the victim. A 2002 WHO study approximated that 223 million children have been victims of sexual violence involving physical contact. A 2025 meta-analysis of 165 studies across 80 countries estimated global lifetime child sexual violence prevalence at 6.1% for forced intercourse (6.8% girls, 3.3% boys), 8.7% for contact abuse, and 11.4% for harassment, with underreporting especially among boys. Yet, due to the sensitivity of the issue and the tendency of the crime to stay hidden, the true figure is likely to be much higher.

Girls are more frequent targets for sexual abuse than boys. The WHO study found that 150 million girls were abused compared to 73 million boys. Other sources also conclude that girls face a greater risk of sexual violence, including prostitution.

=== Transgender and gender diverse people ===
Transgender and gender diverse (TGD) college students are less likely to report sexual violence to the support systems provided by their campus compared to their cisgender counterparts since they feel as though they will not be believed to such systems. Many TGD students at college who have experienced sexual violence faced difficulties in regards to receiving medical care following their experience as they may have gender-specific needs following an experience of sexual violence. There is also a link between whether TGD college students who have experienced sexual violence feel supported by their institution and their institution’s climate regarding TGD people.

== Causes and factors ==
=== Explanations ===
Explaining sexual violence is complicated by the multiple forms it takes and contexts in which it occurs. There is considerable overlap between forms of sexual violence and intimate partner violence. There are factors increasing the risk of someone being coerced into sex, factors increasing the risk of an individual person forcing sex on another person, and factors within the social environment including peers and family influencing the likelihood of rape and the reaction to it.

Research suggests that the various factors have an additive effect, so that the more factors present, the greater the likelihood of sexual violence. In addition, a particular factor may vary in importance according to the life stage.

Some 70% of people who experienced sexual violence were paralyzed before and during the assault. The prevailing view amongst scientists is that this form of tonic immobility occurs in humans when no other options to avoid the sexual violence are available anymore, and the brain paralyses the body in order to allow it to survive with minimal damage.

=== Risk factors ===
The following are individual risks factors:

- Alcohol and drug use
- Delinquency
- Empathic deficits
- General aggressiveness and acceptance of violence
- Early sexual initiation
- Coercive sexual fantasies
- Preference for impersonal sex and sexual-risk taking
- Exposure to sexually explicit media
- Hostility towards women
- Adherence to traditional gender role norms
- Hyper-masculinity
- Suicidal behavior
- Prior sexual victimization or perpetration

The following are relationship risk factors:

- Family environment characterized by physical violence and conflict
- Childhood history of physical, sexual, or emotional abuse
- Emotionally unsupportive family environment
- Poor parent-child relationships, particularly with fathers
- Association with sexually aggressive, hypermasculine, and delinquent peers
- Involvement in a violent or abusive intimate relationship

The following are community factors:

- Poverty
- Lack of employment opportunities
- Lack of institutional support from police and judicial system
- General tolerance of sexual violence within the community
- Weak community sanctions against sexual violence perpetrators

There is also post-catastrophe sexual opportunism. Sexual opportunism during and after catastrophic events is largely unreported. Massive spikes in human trafficking of girls and other humanitarian abuses has been reported in events such as after the devastating April 2015 Nepal earthquake.

=== Perpetrators ===
Perpetrators may come from various backgrounds, and they may be someone known by the victim like a friend, a family member, an intimate partner, an acquaintance, or they may be a complete stranger. While it is estimated that 93% to 97% perpetrators of sexual violence are men, sexual violence is often erroneously dismissed as a women's issue. The primary motivators behind sexually violent acts are believed to be power and control, and not, as it is widely perceived, sexual desire. Sexual violence is rather a violent, aggressive and hostile act aiming to degrade, dominate, humiliate, terrorize and control the victim. Some of the reasons for committing sexual violence are that it reassures the offender about his sexual adequacy, it discharges frustration, compensates for feelings of helplessness, and achieves sexual gratification.

Data on sexually violent men are somewhat limited and heavily biased towards apprehended rapists, except in the United States, where research has also been conducted on male college students. Despite the limited amount of information on sexually violent men, it appears that sexual violence is found in almost all countries (though with differences in prevalence), in all socioeconomic classes and in all age groups from childhood on. Data on sexually violent men also show that most direct their acts at women whom they already know. Among the factors increasing the risk of a man committing rape are those related to attitudes and beliefs, as well as behavior arising from situations and social conditions that provide opportunities and support for abuse.

== Consequences ==
"Sexual and gender-based violence destroys people, it destroys local communities and it is extremely difficult to mend the damage. That's why we have to do more to prevent it." — Norwegian Foreign Minister Ine Eriksen Soreide

Sexual violence is a serious public health problem and it has both short and long term negative physical and psychological effects on health and well-being. There is evidence that male and female victims of sexual violence may experience similar mental health, behavioral and social consequences Watts, Hossain, and Zimmerman (2013) reported that 72.4% of the survivors had at least one gynecological complaint. 52.2% had chronic lower abdominal pain, 27.4% had abnormal vaginal bleeding, 26.6% had infertility, 25.3% had genital sores, and 22.5% had swellings in the abdomen. 18.7% of the participants also had severe psychological and surgical morbidity including alcoholism. 69.4% showed significant psychological distress, 15.8% attempted suicide, 75.6% had at least one surgical complaint. 4.8% of the participants had a positive HIV status.

Women’s psychological health, physical health, and behavioral health are affected by acts of sexual violence, as well as the economic cost of acts of sexual violence. The immediate pathological conditions of women who experience an act of sexual violence are “posttraumatic stress disorder (PTSD), anxiety, depression, and suicide ideation and attempts” and women recover within a year from said pathological conditions, as stated by researchers. The rates of revictimization among women who have experienced sexual violence were measured in a survey that took place in Washington in which were asked questions regarding their mental health following multiple experiences of sexual violence. It was found that “women victimized by multiple perpetrators were struggling with significantly more current posttraumatic-stress-related symptoms, more depression symptoms, and poorer self-rated health” compared to women who did experience multiple sexual assaults. On another note, there aspects of the relationship between survivors and perpetrators that have been noted as important by experts. One of those aspects being that women who were sexually assaulted after the age of 12 often experience PTSD-related hyperarousal when assaulted by a perpetrator that they know very well such as a marital or dating partner.

Additionally, women develop and experience physical health problems as a result of being subjected to an act of sexual violence. The National Violence Survey found that of those who were raped, a third of rape survivors were injured, with the common injuries reported being scratches, bruises, and welts. Moreover, the gynecological health of women who experience sexual violence is also affected. A clinic-based study among 335 women who had been subjected to sexual violence found that “53 girls and women (26 percent) were noted by the examining physician to have signs of vaginitis or cervicitis, although some preexisting infections may have been subclinical or missed by the examiner”. There is also a prevalence of headaches, gastrointestinal problems, unhealthy sleeping patterns, and disabilities among women who been subjected to sexual violence.

The issue of sexual violence on college campuses is pervasive since there exists many women who have experienced sexual violence during their undergraduate years. This specific perpetration of sexual violence goes unreported for numerous reasons such as survivors knowing their perpetrator, survivors feeling shame and guilt surrounding their identity as a survivor of sexual violence, and or a person not wanting to label their experience as one of sexual violence. Among individuals who have experienced an act of sexual violence, they may face psychological problems such as PTSD and rumination.

One study made an effort to determine the awareness of the sexual violence reported by undergraduates. This study aimed to determine whether feelings of institutional betrayal can predict the development of PTSD in survivors who had experienced sexual assault, and to determine whether rumination is a moderator for “the relationship between institutional betrayal and PTSD symptoms”. The study pulls data from 332 undergrads, most of whom identified as women and white, on their exposure to the sexual and non-sexual traumatic events they had experienced. The study also measured how betrayed the undergraduates felt by their institution in the aftermath of the sexual violence they experienced, whether they were sexually abused as children, and whether they had patterns related to rumination. The study found that, of the participating undergrads, 41% had experienced an unwanted sexual experience since the age of 14. Moreover, of the 51 participants whose unwanted sexual experiences could be classified as rape, only 19 participants labeled said experiences as rape. The study showed that child sexual abuse can predict later institutional betrayal, institutional betrayal can predict PTSD, and that rumination does not moderate the relationship between institutional betrayal and symptoms of PTSD. The results also showed that the trauma of sexual violence is more harmful when it was inflicted at a trusted institution. The study demonstrates how important it is for those who have experienced sexual violence to be able to label their own experiences.

In child sexual abuse (CSA) cases, the child may develop mental health disorders that can extend into adult life especially if sexual abuse involved actual intercourse. Studies on abused boys have shown that around one in five continue in later life to molest children themselves. CSA may lead to negative behavioral patterns in later life, learning difficulties as well as regression of or slower development.

In some cases victims of sexual violence may be stigmatized and ostracized by their families and others. Societal perceptions that the victim provoked sexual violence lead to a lack of disclosure of sexual assault which is associated with even more severe psychological consequences, particularly in children. Thus, more interventions are needed in order to order to change societal attitudes towards sexual violence as well as efforts designed to educate those to whom the survivors may disclose the assault.

=== Possible fatal outcomes ===
Examples of possible fatal outcomes related to sexual violence include suicide, homicide, and HIV/AIDS-related death.

=== Possible non-fatal outcomes ===
==== Physical consequences ====
Examples of non-fatal physical consequences of sexual violence include unwanted pregnancy, infertility, sexual dysfunction, chronic pelvic pain, urinary tract infections, sexually transmitted infections (including HIV/AIDS), obesity, anorexia, gastrointestinal disorders, gynecological and pregnancy complications, migraine and other frequent headaches, fatigue, and nausea.

==== Psychological consequences ====
Examples of non-fatal psychological consequences of sexual violence include denial, shock, fear, confusion, anxiety, guilt, depression, alienation, eating disorders, social phobias, rape trauma syndrome, PTSD, and increased substance use or abuse.

== Treatment ==
In the emergency room, emergency contraceptive medications are offered to women raped by men because about 5% of such rapes result in pregnancy. Preventative medication against sexually transmitted infections are given to victims of all types of sexual assault (especially for the most common diseases like chlamydia, gonorrhea, trichomoniasis and bacterial vaginosis) and a blood serum is collected to test for STIs (such as HIV, hepatitis B and syphilis). Any survivor with abrasions are immunized for tetanus if five years have elapsed since the last immunization. Short-term treatment with a benzodiazepine may help with acute anxiety and antidepressants may be helpful for symptoms of PTSD, depression and panic attacks.

Sexual violence survivors who have lasting psychological symptoms as a result of their trauma may seek psychological counseling and therapy.

Informal treatment, or support, includes social support, which can provide avenues for social justice engagement. Themes of self-reflection, social support, and activism aimed at supporting other survivors and preventing sexual violence are associated with improved functioning and facilitating positive change post trauma. Involvement in anti-sexual violence activism can aid survivors in making sense of the social conditions that contributed to their violation, recover self-confidence, and facilitate peer support, however survivors have also identified burn out to be prevalent in activist work.

== Prevention ==
The number of initiatives addressing sexual violence is limited and few have been evaluated. The approaches vary with most interventions being developed and implemented in industrialized countries. How relevant they may be in other settings is not well known. Early interventions and the provision of psychological support may prevent or minimize many of the harmful and lasting psychological impacts of sexual assault.
The interventions that have been developed can be categorized as follows.

Initiatives to prevent sexual violence
Individual approaches	Health care responses	Community based efforts	Legal and policy responses
Psychological care and support	Medico-legal services	Prevention campaigns	Legal reform
Programmes for perpetrators	Training for health care professionals	Community activism by men	International treaties
Developmental approaches	Prophylaxis for HIV infection	School-based programmes	Enforcement mechanisms
	Centres providing comprehensive care to victims of sexual assault		

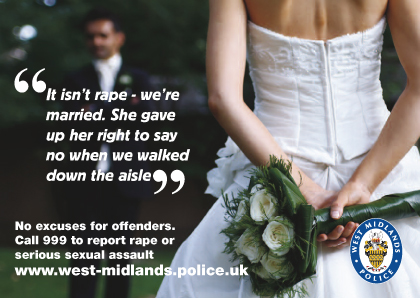
West Midlands Police campaign poster against sexual violence

There is also a public health approach to prevention. Because sexual violence is widespread and directly or indirectly affects a community as whole, a community-oriented approach encourages not just victims and advocates to spread awareness and prevent sexual violence, but allocates responsibility to wider community to do so as well. The CDC's report on Sexual Violence Prevention: Beginning the Dialogue suggests following its four step model.

1. Define the Problem: Collect data about the victims, perpetrators, where it's occurring, and how often it's happening.
2. Identify Risk and Protective Factors: Research the risk factors that may put people at risk for victimization of perpetration
3. Develop and Test Prevention Strategies: Work with community leaders, practitioners to test different sexual violence prevention strategies
4. Ensure Widespread Adoption: Implement and spread awareness about the successful prevention strategies

In a summit held at the University of Michigan Injury Prevention Center, experts reviewed the efforts currently being made on college campuses regarding sexual violence. Moreover, preventions need to take into account how people are more susceptible to sexual violence based on the vulnerable positions they are in. Vulnerable positions of students who are of a non-white, and the vulnerable positions of students who are not cisgender and or heterosexual all in regard to sexual violence. Alongside this, experts state that it is just as crucial to understand the factors that have an influence on whether or not someone will perpetrate sexual violence, such as the behaviors of men in relation to their consumption of alcohol, the interpersonal relationships are involved in on college campuses, and how the practices of communities and institutions currently address sexual violence on their campuses.

Experts at the summit stated that prevention programs that are focused on reducing men’s perpetration of sexual violence have proved to be effective in what they wish to accomplish such as RealConsent, an online program “designed for college-age men to increase prosocial intervening behaviors, change attitudes and normative beliefs about sex, rape, and masculine gender roles, and increasing knowledge of consent”. Moreover, experts state that there are a few prevention programs focused on educating women on potential threats and how to defend themselves during possible perpetration and thus demonstrate prolonged difference in behavior among students on college campuses. The prevention program such as Enhanced Assess, Acknowledge, Act (EAAA) Sexual Assault Resistance program was an exception. EAAA being a program that increases women’s reaction time to possible dangerous situations, reduces possible emotional obstacles women have to face while in a possibly dangerous situation, and teaches possibly beneficial verbal and physical tactics to use in potential dangerous situations. Moreover, the program reduces “the relative risk of attempted and completed rape (non-consensual oral, vaginal, or anal penetration) by 50% in the year following participation, as well as non-penetrative sexual violence”. Also, the article mentions that bystander training, as a form of prevention at the relationship-level. The programs focusing on changing the societal norms that men and women have regarding sexual violence on college campuses through decreasing the appetence of sexual violence among those men and women as well as through building skill in those men and women to better reduce sexual violence. Men and women that were part of with this training felt that they were better able equipped to prevent the perpetration of sexual violence since they acquired skills that allowed for them to prevent the perpetration of sexual violence within a community. On another note, experts noted in the summit that there have been no prevention methods at the community-level which have had their effectiveness tested in a sufficient manner.

On another note, a qualitative study that made efforts into understanding how sexual violence can be prevented within male-dominated fields, which highlights how institutions as whole should structure themselves in a way that reduces sexual violence. Researchers asked professionals knowledgeable on sexual violence prevention and miners that are a part of the mining industry on how sexual violence is prevented. Through the analysis of the qualitative interviews, it was noticed that many of the participants of the study stated that there should exist a form of prevention of sexual violence within the male-dominated field of the mining industry whether that be through training done through work or support for survivors at work. Among the participants, 16 were professionals and 18 miners with the participants who were professionals being regarded as specialists and educators. Alongside this, participants mentioned that zero-tolerance approaches are not effective methods of prevention of sexual violence as these approaches are only effective as a reaction to sexual violence that has already occurred. As stated by one participant of the professionals, “It’s not necessarily a multidisciplinary approach”. A notable finding of the study was that participants had mixed opinions on the processes of reporting sexual violence at these mining sites. Some stating that survivors have accessible means to report sexual violence that they have experienced, while others stated that those same processes do not allow for survivors to feel safe in reporting. In addition to the opinions on reporting, participants stated that they wanted to see change in the mining industry regarding sexual violence, whether it be through changing the workplace culture of said industry or for there to be reliable help for those who have experienced sexual violence.

Child sexual abuse prevention programmes were developed in the United States of America during the 1970s and originally delivered to children. Programmes delivered to parents were developed in the 1980s and took the form of one-off meetings, two to three hours long. In the last 15 years, web-based programmes have been developed.

== Statistics ==
The below table shows the annual rate of sexual violence reports according to the United Nations Office on Drugs and Crime.

Country	Reported annual sexual violence per 100,000	Year
Albania	4.8	2023
Algeria	5.2	2023
Andorra	49.7	2019
Antigua and Barbuda	115.7	2023
Argentina	84.6	2023
Armenia	6.0	2023
Australia	137.3	2023
Austria	59.7	2023
Azerbaijan	0.8	2021
Bahamas	51.3	2022
Bahrain	15.6	2008
Barbados	44.3	2022
Belarus	9.5	2019
Belgium	99.2	2023
Belize	36.7	2022
Bermuda	144.7	2017
Bhutan	10.2	2017
Bolivia	80.2	2023
Bosnia and Herzegovina	6.2	2023
Botswana	126.6	2014
Brazil	28.3	2013
Bulgaria	9.2	2023
Burundi	11.7	2014
Cabo Verde	31.0	2018
Cameroon	3.2	2014
Canada	106.1	2023
Chile	94.1	2023
Colombia	60.5	2022
Costa Rica	181.8	2023
Croatia	21.5	2023
Cyprus	8.3	2023
Czech Republic	17.2	2023
Denmark	113.7	2023
Dominica	134.7	2022
Dominican Republic	47.9	2023
East Timor	10.6	2017
Ecuador	86.6	2023
Egypt	0.1	2011
El Salvador	107.3	2022
England and Wales	324.8	2022
Estonia	31.2	2023
Finland	109.0	2023
France	134.9	2023
Georgia	11.1	2019
Germany	62.3	2023
Ghana	5.7	2021
Greece	10.2	2023
Grenada	232.3	2023
Guatemala	54.4	2023
Guinea	0.3	2007
Guyana	36.4	2023
Honduras	28.9	2023
Hong Kong	24.5	2013
Hungary	5.5	2023
Iceland	130.0	2023
India	9.0	2013
Indonesia	1.6	2022
Ireland	56.6	2023
Israel	81.3	2023
Italy	11.3	2023
Ivory Coast	3.3	2008
Jamaica	62.2	2023
Japan	7.1	2023
Jordan	8.1	2023
Kazakhstan	11.4	2017
Kenya	13.2	2022
Kosovo	8.7	2019
Kuwait	18.2	2009
Latvia	29.3	2023
Lebanon	0.0	2023
Liechtenstein	50.5	2023
Lithuania	6.3	2023
Luxembourg	45.9	2023
Macau	21.2	2022
Madagascar	4.4	2015
Malaysia	10.4	2023
Maldives	92.7	2017
Malta	29.5	2023
Mauritius	47.5	2021
Mexico	68.9	2023
Moldova	18.0	2023
Monaco	13.4	2016
Mongolia	21.2	2023
Montenegro	6.3	2023
Morocco	16.5	2023
Mozambique	2.7	2009
Myanmar	0.0	2020
Namibia	43.9	2021
Netherlands	27.5	2023
New Zealand	117.2	2023
Nicaragua	32.4	2019
Nigeria	1.0	2013
North Macedonia	7.1	2023
Northern Ireland	219.9	2023
Norway	95.3	2023
Oman	3.2	2023
Pakistan	2.4	2023
Palestine	5.8	2018
Panama	169.2	2022
Paraguay	89.5	2023
Peru	70.2	2022
Philippines	1.8	2012
Poland	9.1	2023
Portugal	30.9	2023
Puerto Rico	35.4	2017
Romania	16.8	2023
Russia	12.8	2020
Rwanda	15.6	2013
Saint Kitts and Nevis	117.7	2022
Saint Lucia	102.1	2023
Saudi Arabia	2.2	2019
Scotland	247.5	2023
Senegal	0.9	2016
Serbia	7.9	2023
Sierra Leone	10.6	2008
Singapore	33.9	2023
Slovakia	10.7	2023
Slovenia	16.2	2023
Solomon Islands	24.0	2008
South Africa	86.9	2017
South Korea	43.3	2023
Spain	39.9	2023
Sri Lanka	11.3	2019
St. Vincent and Grenadines	125.4	2022
Suriname	113.7	2023
Sweden	191.5	2023
Switzerland	33.7	2023
Syria	0.3	2018
São Tomé and Príncipe	0.0	2011
Tajikistan	2.6	2011
Tanzania	0.1	2015
Thailand	7.5	2023
Trinidad and Tobago	45.9	2020
Turkey	53.4	2014
Uganda	50.4	2016
Ukraine	1.6	2020
United Arab Emirates	4.9	2016
Uruguay	20.3	2023
Vatican City	403.6	2023
Yemen	0.3	2009
Zimbabwe	94.5	2023

=== Estimate of prevalence ===
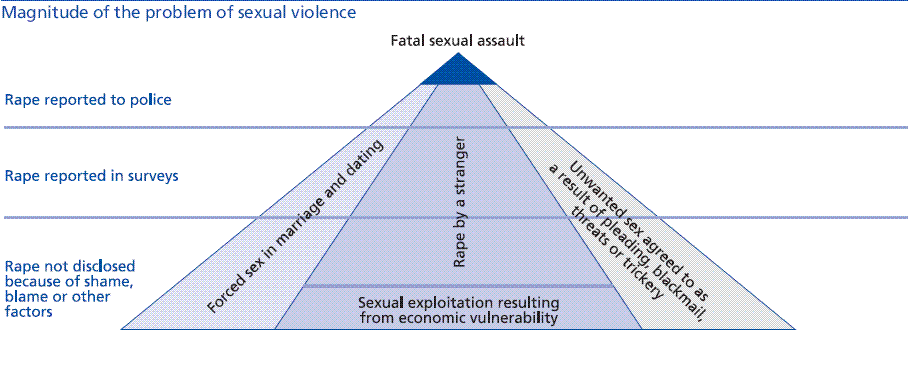
How rape statistics are formulated and how they correspond to the extent of the problem.

Sexual violence is a generally underreported phenomenon, therefore available statistics are unlikely to inform about the true scale of the problem. The available data are scanty and fragmented. Police data, for instance, are often incomplete and limited. Data from medico-legal clinics, on the other hand, may be biased towards the more violent incidents of sexual abuse. In addition, the proportion of people who seek medical services for immediate problems related to sexual violence is also relatively small.

Reasons for non-reporting include shame and embarrassment, fear of not being believed, fear of the perpetrator of the crime, fear of the legal process, or disbelief that the police would be able to do anything to help them. Men are even more reluctant to report sexual violence due to extreme embarrassment and concerns about opinions of other people, their masculinity and the fact that they were unable to prevent the assault. Thus information about the extent of sexual violence against males is especially limited. Child sexual abuse is also largely underreported. Most of the data comes from asking adults about their past experiences.

One of the reasons for non-reporting is that children lack independent access to resources. They normally require the cooperation of one of their parents who may refuse to believe their child, or may, in fact, be the perpetrator.

Data on sexual violence typically come from police, clinical settings, nongovernmental organizations and survey research. The relationship between these sources and the global magnitude of the problem of sexual violence may be viewed as corresponding to an iceberg floating in water (see diagram). The small visible tip represents cases reported to police. A larger section may be elucidated through survey research and the work of nongovernmental organizations.

The percentage of population which was according to statistical surveys victim to sexual violence in the previous 12 months is shown below.

Country	Female	Male	Total	Year
Argentina	2.7	0.4	1.7	2016
Australia	0.7	0.3	0.5	2023
Austria	1.1	-	-	2021
Belgium	1.6	0.4	1.0	2021
Brazil	1.0	0.4	0.8	2019
Cameroon	5.2	2.7	4.0	2018
Canada	3.7	0.5	2.2	2014
England and Wales	4.5	1.2	2.9	2018
Finland	3.0	0.5	1.7	2022
France	0.9	0.2	0.5	2022
Germany	3.6	0.3	2.1	2020
Guatemala	3.9	0.3	-	2019
Guyana	1.4	-	-	2017
Israel	0.6	-	0.4	2023
Latvia	9.0	0.5	5.0	2021
Luxembourg	3.8	0.9	2.3	2020
Mexico	2.3	0.3	1.4	2023
Peru	2.2	-	-	2022
Philippines	2.0	-	-	2017
Portugal	0.4	-	0.3	2022
Serbia	0.4	-	-	2021
Slovenia	0.7	0.2	0.4	2020
South Korea	-	-	0.5	2022
St. Vincent and Grenadines	5.0	24.0	-	2021
Switzerland	0.5	0.1	0.3	2021
Thailand	-	-	0.0	2016
Uganda	12.7	4.0	-	2016
United States of America	-	-	0.1	2023

== Culture ==
Sexual violence occurs in all cultures with varying definitions of what constitutes it. It is possible that in cultures where man and his manly role are prized better, additional perceived or real power may encourage them to think of their "rights". If a woman resists sexual intercourse, it may be perceived as a direct threat by men to their masculinity, triggering a crisis of male identity and contributing to sexual control and violence as it is seen as a way of resolving this crisis. It has been reported that victims who attempt resistance or escape from the situation are more likely to be brutalized by the offender,32 thereby giving an inflated sense of power to the abuser as was seen in the New Delhi gang rape case of Nirbhaya in December 2012. It is likely that in patriarchal cultures, any resistance from the woman victim is perceived by the offender as an insult to his "manhood" further provoking him to resort to more violent means to control the victim.

There is a theory that explains sexual violence as socioculturally constructed which disproves the biological framework that suggests sexual violence is a result of a man's sexual urges. This theory looks to prove that sexual violence is a natural behavior that originates from the "biological propensity to reproduce have a net positive effect on the person's (resorting to sexual violence) reproductive success. The sociocultural theory takes into account gender power equations, moral values, male dominance, and attitudes toward violence."

== Feminism ==
Feminist scholars and activists have made unique contributions to the discourse on sexual violence against women and men. They have proposed that the root causes of sexual violence lie in the social structure characterized by severe inequality, in which the male is dominant and the female exploited. Feminists also hold that the weak institutional arrangements in place to address consequences of sexual violence, as well as unfair treatment of the victims (or survivors, an alternatively proposed terminology) are direct reflections of the ways in which society regards men, women and the sexual relations between them. Furthermore, feminist critique has led to a closer convergence between feminism and psychology in the study of sexual violence.

Conveying a connection between gender-based sexual violence and concepts of power-seeking and subordination was pioneered in the 1970s and has proven to be very influential. Within this context, rape has been assessed as a foremost tool of intimidation used by men against women. Similarly, domestic violence can be viewed as a particularly severe form of patriarchal domination and oppression.

Some feminist views on pornography also suggest a link between rape and pornography, by which pornography that degrades, humiliates and exercises violence upon the female body feeds a culture which validates this kind of behavior. There are also feminists positing that certain feminist forms of pornography could actually stimulate emancipation.

An intersection of Marxist and feminist theories has been utilized to offer additional insight into the topic of sexual violence. According to this argument, labor and sex are analogous in the roles they play in their respective overarching exploitative systems: both are produced by the exploited person and both are forcefully taken away from them.

Some feminist scholars have illuminated the idea that all women cannot have uniformly similar experiences of sexual violence or its aftermath. For instance, race and ethnicity are significant determinants of these experiences, which serves to show that approaches that are exclusively feminist or exclusively anti-racist in nature are misguided. Instead, a proposition has been made for use of intersectionality when studying these cases.

Feminist ideas have served as catalysts for transnational movements to combat violence against women, including sexual violence. This agenda has also been adopted by feminist organizations, as illustrated by the current initiative titled the Rape Task Force of the National Organization for Women (NOW).

Among other countries, feminists and women's rights activists in Egypt faced extreme challenges in combatting the grave issues of sexual violence. In 2020, the country witnessed an escalated #MeToo movement. However, it took a few months for the spark to fade. In 2021, the authorities in Egypt arrested six witnesses of a gang rape case that took place in 2014 at the country's Cairo hotel. It highlighted the difficulties that the rights defenders were facing.

== History ==
=== Antiquity ===
The oldest textual references to sexual violence can be traced back to, amongst other cultures, the ancient Greeks and Romans, where women were seen as property without any rights over their bodies or sexual integrity. Rape of women during peace times was therefore considered as property crime only affecting their owners: the husbands, sons or brothers. A linguistic clue can still be found in verb to rape, which derives from Latin rapere, which originally meant 'to steal, seize, rob, carry away'; any infringement or damage to a woman or girl was primarily considered to be an offence against her husband if she was married, or against her father if she was not, and a crime against the community and public morality instead of a crime against the individual woman or girl herself. Generally speaking, the victim was blamed for having put the family to shame, especially if she was not married yet and lost her virginity during the rape; many cultures tried to resolve this by allowing the rapist to marry the victim in order to restore the 'family honour' of the latter. During armed conflict sexual violence, particularly rape, was perceived as a normal byproduct of war, as "a socially acceptable behavior well within the rules of warfare". In Ancient Greece, women were sometimes the reason for the attack of a city, conquering women as new wives or concubines, legitimate booty, as slaves or as trophies. The fact that sexual violence to women was commonplace during both war and peace times led to the negligence of any indications of what the methods, aims and magnitude of such violence was; it was face- and nameless.

=== Middle Ages and early modern period ===
The European Middle Ages strongly reflected a patriarchal view of sexual violence. During times of peace, female spouses had no right to refuse sex with their husbands. Even though laws punishing rapes existed, sexual violence was usually considered as justified or inconsequential. Usually, depending on the elite's views, which perceived sexual violence as a minor issue, sexual violence was not prosecuted. This view was also transferred to the colonies. In Alta California, for example, the Catholic clergy relied heavily on corporal punishment such as flogging, placing in the stocks or shackling of Amerindian women within their programs of Christianization. Within this context of trying to restore a certain social order, women were often the victims of sexual violence if politically active and posing a threat to the existing order. With regard to times of war, jurists, writers and scholars argued that as soon as war is just, no boundaries would be set towards methods used in order to achieve victory. However, with Alberico Gentili (1552–1608) discussions started that suffering of women should be reduced and rape prohibited during peace and war times. However, this view was not accepted for a long time, as women and children not participating in the fighting were still considered as being the enemy and the patriarchal view on women prevailed during peace and war times.

=== Codification of laws of war on gender-related crimes (c. 1800–1945) ===
Gradually, over the centuries laws and customs of war changed in direction of a wider understanding of sexual violence and the need to protect potential victims. During the American Civil War (1861–1865), the US started to codify the customary rules regulating land-based wars. On 24 April 1863, President Abraham Lincoln tried to inter alia regulate the sexual conduct of Union soldiers towards civilians in hostile territory with the Lieber Code, which contained one of the first explicit prohibitions on rape. Paragraphs 44 and 47 of the Lieber Code contained provisions prohibiting several crimes including "all rape" by an American soldier in a hostile country against its inhabitants "under the penalty of death, or such other severe punishment as may seem adequate for the gravity of the offense". Thus, the only enforcement mechanisms were the military commanders themselves, having the right to execute the soldiers immediately.

Scholars usually interpret Article 46 of the Annex to the Convention (IV) respecting the Laws and Customs of War on Land of the Second Hague Convention (18 October 1907), which stipulated that "Family honour and rights ... must be respected", to be an implicit prohibition of sexual assault or rape. However, because sexual assault was once again conceptualised as a crime of honour against the family instead of a violent crime against the individual person, Clack (2018) regarded this provision as "a step backwards from the Lieber Code".

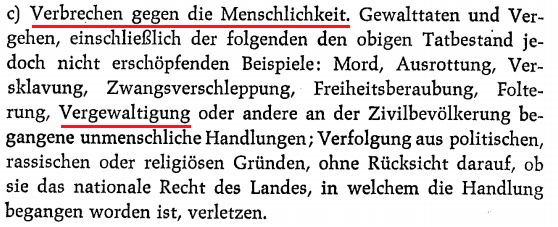
Control Council Law No. 10 (1945) listed 'rape' as a 'crime against humanity'.

After World War I, a War Crimes Commission was established in order to bring war criminals before justice. Forced prostitution and rape was seen as grave violation of the customs and laws of war. After World War II (1939–1945), under the International Military Tribunal at Nuremberg (IMT) and the International Military Tribunal for the Far East at Tokyo (IMTFE), the spectrum of sexual violence as war crime was widened even though rape was not explicitly mentioned in the final verdicts. The transcripts of the trials did contain evidence of rape, sexual slavery, sexual sadism, sexual torture, sexual mutilation, forced sterilization, forced abortion, forced nudity, forced pornography and forced prostitution. But only after the Tokyo Tribunal, when Japanese commanders were prosecuted – for the first time based on the chain of command – for not having prevented rape and sexual slavery of comfort women during the Second World War, was sexual violence gradually considered as a grave war crime in itself. This view was expressed for the first time after Nuremberg and Tokyo in the second series of trials for the prosecution of "lesser" war criminals in Allied-occupied Germany, where the Allied Control Council Law No. 10 (Article II §1.c), enacted on 20 December 1945, explicitly listed rape as constituting a "crime against humanity".

=== International legal framework (after 1945) ===
After 1945, an extensive amount of both hard and soft law instruments have set rules, standards and norms for the protection of victims of sexual offences. These include the Convention on the Elimination of All Forms of Discrimination against Women (CEDAW, United Nations 1979); the Vienna Declaration and Programme of Action (United Nations June 1993); Declaration on the Elimination of Violence Against Women (United Nations December 1993); the Inter-American Convention on the Prevention, Punishment and Eradication of Violence Against Women (Belém do Pará Convention) (Organization of American States 1994); the Protocol to the African Charter on Human and Peoples' Rights on the Rights of Women in Africa (Maputo Protocol) (African Union 2003), and the Convention on preventing and combating violence against women and domestic violence (Istanbul Convention) (Council of Europe 2011).

The resulting, ever growing body of international humanitarian law (IHL) strongly prohibits sexual violence in all armed conflicts, and international human rights law (IHRL) and international customary law strongly prohibit it at all times. IHL ensures women are protected through a two-tiered approach, being covered by general (equal protection as men) and specific protections. IHL mandates special protections to women, according to their additional needs when they are more vulnerable, such as widows, the sick and wounded, migrants, the internally displaced, or those held in detention. Meanwhile, second-wave feminists launched the anti-rape movement in the 1960s and 1970s, leading to national legal prohibitions on marital rape by most countries around the world by the 2010s, while marry-your-rapist laws were increasingly abolished in the same decades.

Groundbreaking case law both by the ad hoc Tribunals of International Criminal Tribunal for Rwanda (ICTR) and International Criminal Tribunal for former Yugoslavia (ICTY) established acts of rape and sexual violence as crimes of genocide and crimes against humanity. ICTR's conviction of Jean-Paul Akayesu for genocide and crimes against humanity on 2 September 1998 is the first case in which sexual violence is perceived as an integral part of genocide as defined in the Convention on the Prevention and Punishment of the Crime of Genocide. The first trial solely focused on the perpetration of systematic sexual violence (rape camps) and on crimes against humanity committed against women and girls was the Foča case, a ruling before the ICTY. The Statute of the International Criminal Court (ICC) also explicitly incorporates rape and other forms of sexual violence in the list of war crimes and therefore recognizes sexual violence as a grave breach of IHL and of the Geneva Conventions.

The UN Security Council, ECOSOC and the UN Commission on Human Rights do not take into account the nature of the conflict with respect to the protection of women in war time. Three reports from the UN Secretary-General and five UN Security Council resolutions specifically address sexual violence. United Nations Security Council Resolution 1888 (2009), in particular, created the Office of the Special Representative of the Secretary General for Sexual Violence in Conflict (SRSG-SVC). The Office highlighted six priorities and identified eight priority countries: Bosnia and Herzegovina, Central African Republic (CAR), Colombia, Côte d'Ivoire, Democratic Republic of Congo (DRC), Liberia, South Sudan, and Sudan. SRSG-SVC is also engaged in the Middle East (Syria) and in Asia and the Pacific (Cambodia). Despite strong prohibitions of international law, enforcement mechanisms against sexual violence are fragile or do not exist in many parts of the world.

== Today ==
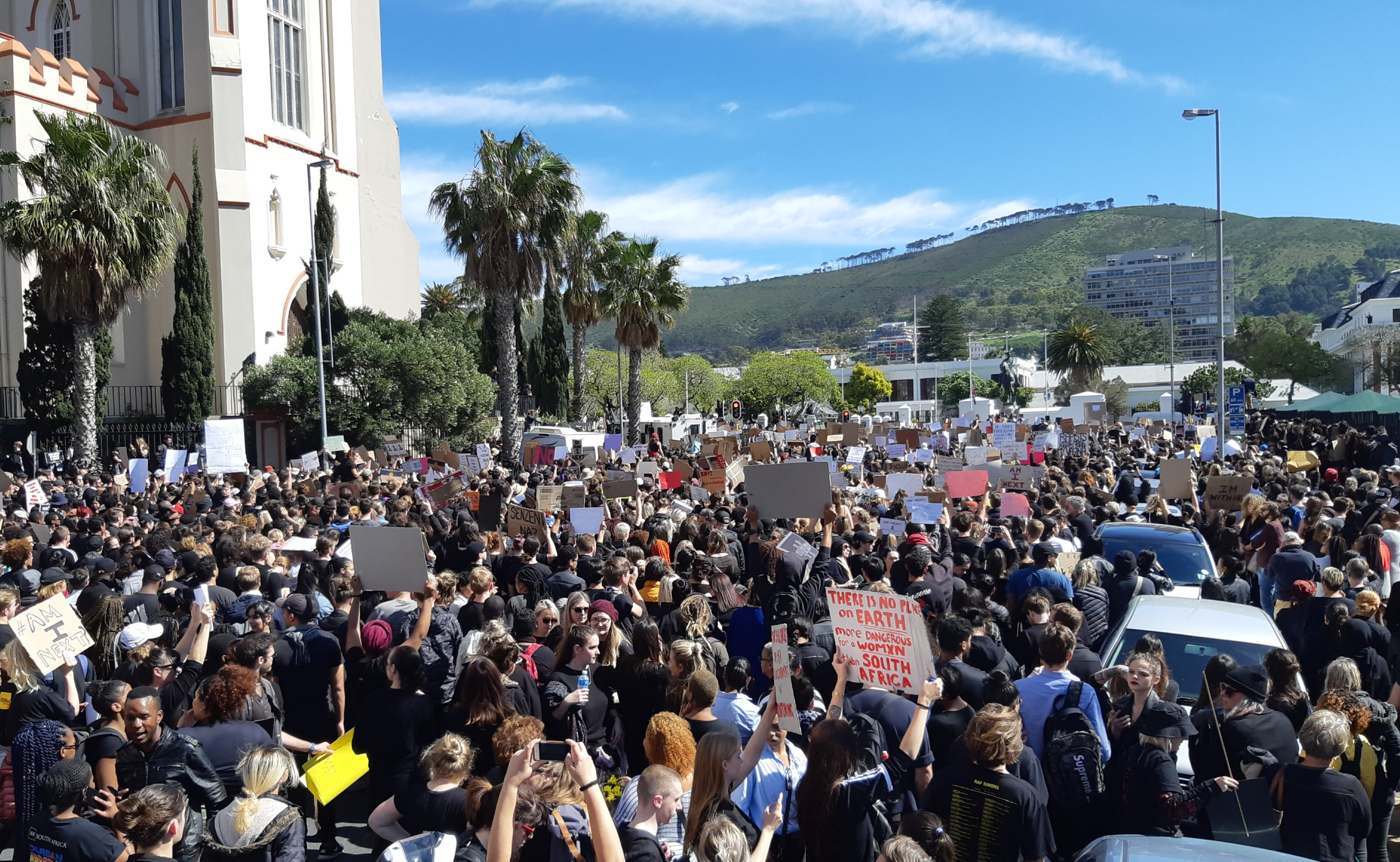
Demonstration against sexual violence in South Africa following the murder of Uyinene Mrwetyana, 2019

Sexual violence against women in modern warfare constitutes a grave violation of human rights, with devastating consequences that persist long after conflicts cease. In conflicts such as the Bosnian War in the 1990s, women endured widespread sexual violence, including systematic rape camps, as a tool of ethnic cleansing. The Rwandan Genocide in 1994 also saw the use of sexual violence as a weapon, with an estimated 250,000 to 500,000 women experiencing sexual assault.

The conflict in Syria has witnessed a disturbing pattern of sexual violence, including rape, forced marriage, and human trafficking. The Yazidi women in Iraq faced horrific atrocities at the hands of ISIS, experiencing sexual slavery and systemic violence.

During Hamas' surprise attack on Israel, acts of sexual violence against Israelis have been reported, including rape, mutilation and torture. Similar atrocities have been reported against Palestinians, including rape, sexualized torture and mutilation.

== See also ==
- Carla Del Ponte
- Centres Against Sexual Assault Victoria, Australia
- Gender-related violence
- Louise Arbour
- Post-assault treatment of sexual assault victims
- Ritual servitude
- Rwandan genocide
- Sexual violence in Finland
- Sexual violence in Papua New Guinea
- Sexual violence in South Africa
- Sexual violence in the Democratic Republic of the Congo
- Special Rapporteur on Violence Against Women
