= Women's rights in 2014 =

Time period in Women's right movement

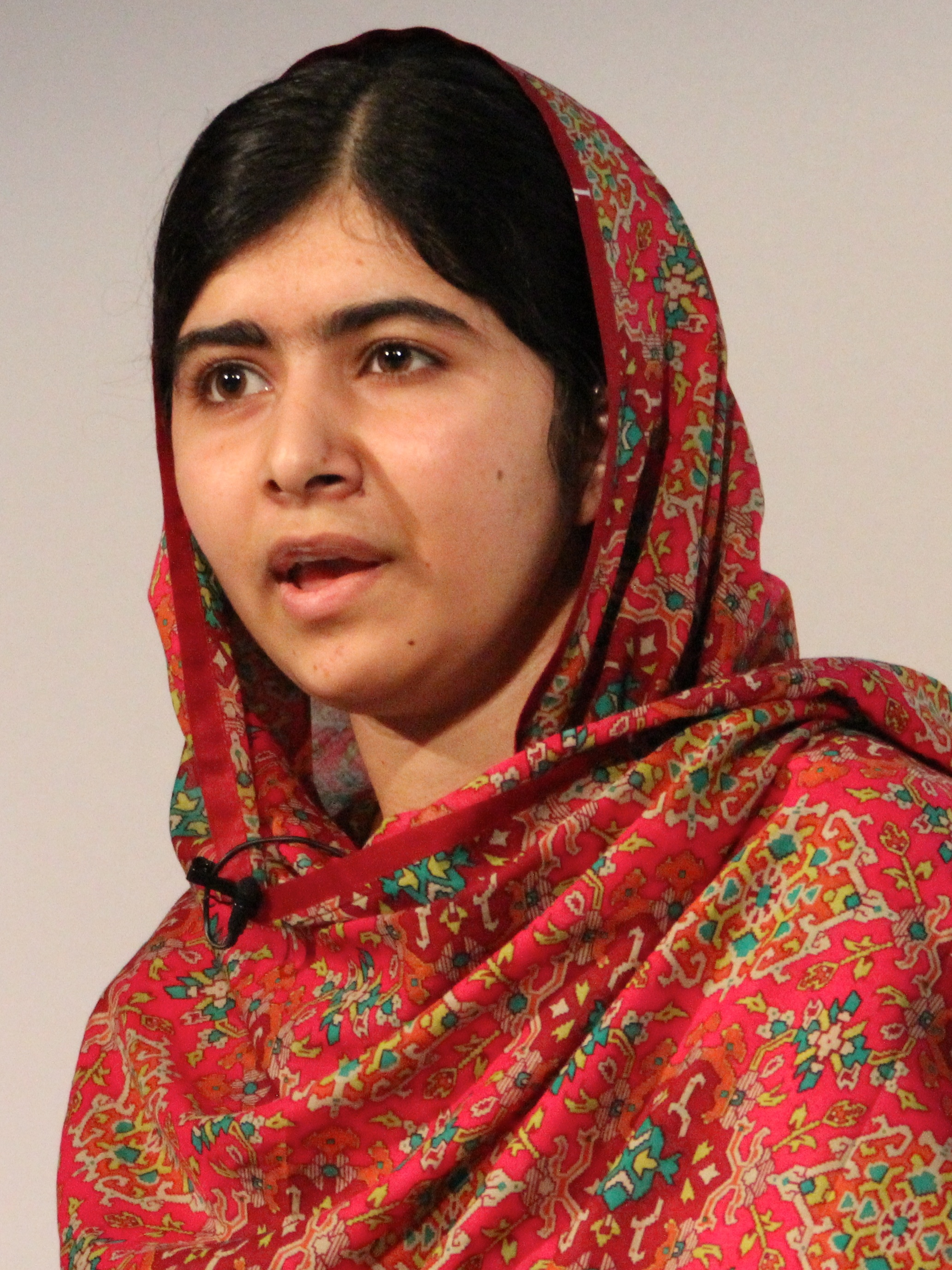
Pakistani activist Malala Yousafzai shared the Nobel Peace Prize in December 2014. She was shot in October 2012 by the Taliban for her efforts to secure education for girls.

2014 was described as a watershed year for women's rights, by newspapers such as The Guardian. It was described as a year in which women's voices acquired greater legitimacy and authority. Time magazine said 2014 "may have been the best year for women since the dawn of time". However, The Huffington Post called it "a bad year for women, but a good year for feminism". San Francisco writer Rebecca Solnit argued that it was "a year of feminist insurrection against male violence" and a "lurch forward" in the history of feminism, and The Guardian said the "globalisation of protest" at violence against women was "groundbreaking", and that social media had enabled a "new version of feminist solidarity".

Denise Balkissoon, writing in The Globe and Mail, disagreed with and criticized the view that 2014 marked a "watershed" moment and that "some collective 'we' has finally had enough", citing her ongoing concerns regarding a "broken system" with respect to violence against women. United Nations' Special Rapporteur on Violence Against Women, Rashida Manjoo, said that violence against women "is acknowledged as a pervasive and widespread human rights violation" and that as of 2014, "no single country can claim that there is progressive elimination occurring".

== Issues ==
=== Street harassment, assault ===
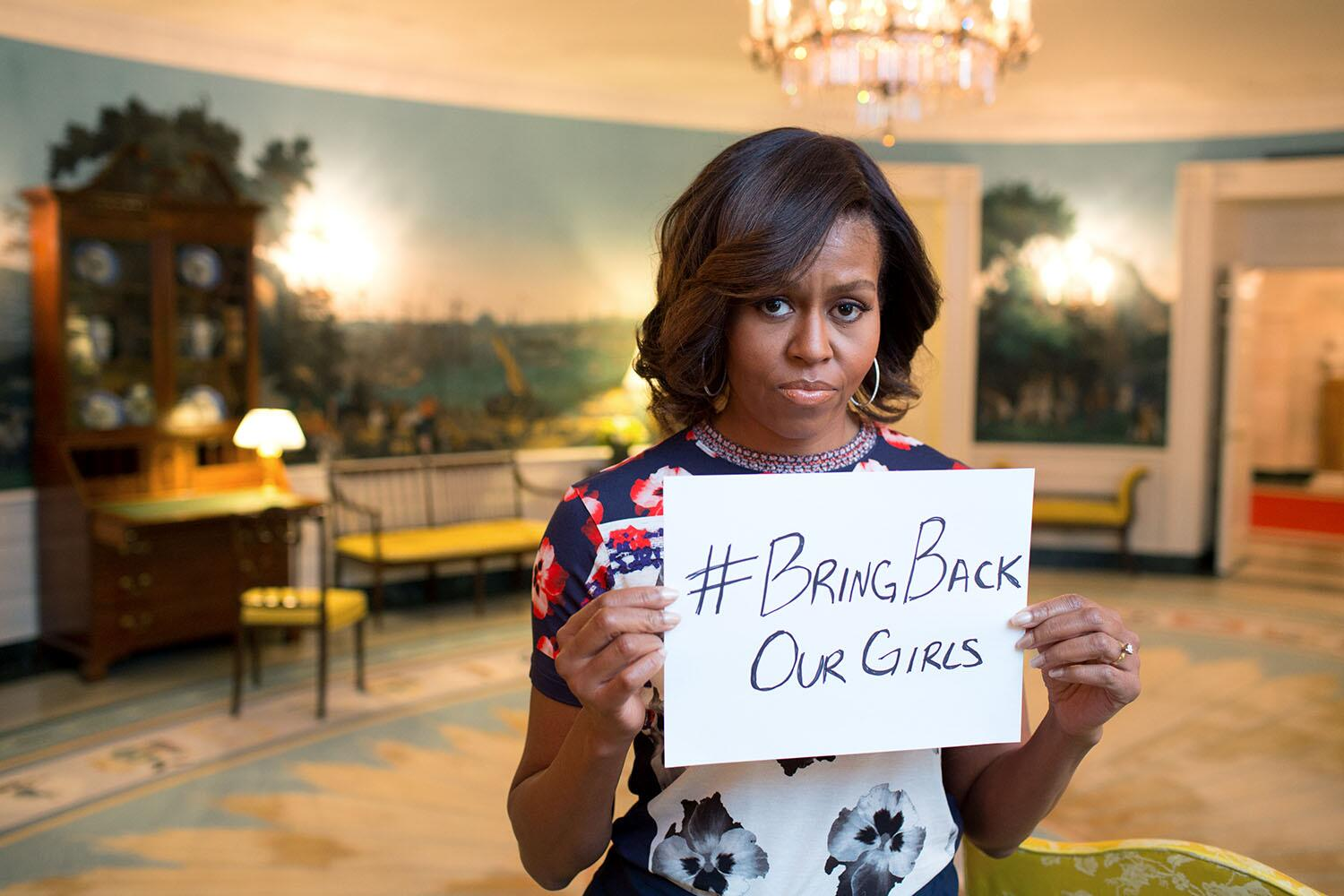
First Lady Michelle Obama supported protests against the Chibok schoolgirls kidnapping, which took place in Borno State, Nigeria, April 2014.

Marlene Leung of CTV News described 2014 as "the year women joined forces online and the Internet listened". The Twitter campaign #YesAllWomen, offering examples of sexism and harassment, attracted over one million tweets within four days in May. The hashtag was created after the Isla Vista killings in California, a killing spree in which the killer's misogyny was cited as a factor.

The street harassment of women was highlighted when actor Shoshana Roberts was hired by Hollaback! to walk through the streets of New York City. Their two-minute video, 10 Hours of Walking in NYC as a Woman, filmed over a period of ten hours, showed 108 instances described as harassment, including comments from men regarding Roberts' appearance. She received online threats after the video aired. In June, the Egyptian government criminalized sexual harassment, though campaigners questioned whether the law would be enforced.

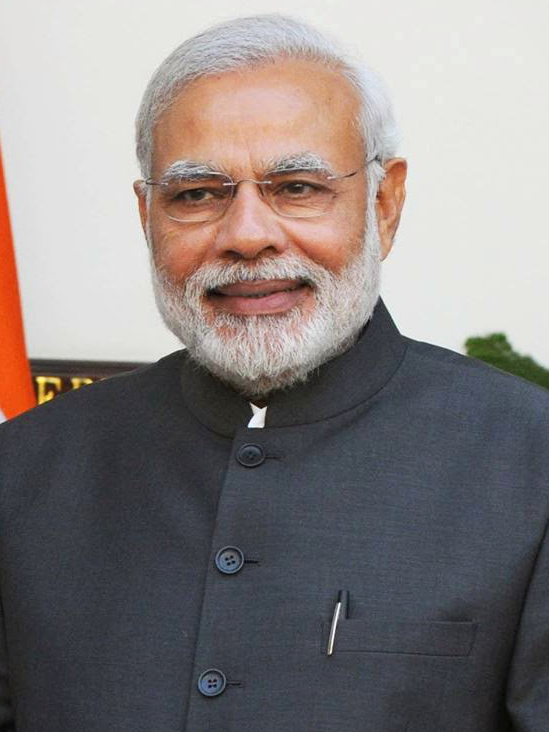
India's Prime Minister, Narendra Modi, spoke about imposing "as many restrictions on the sons as have been imposed on our daughters".

Responding to the heightened awareness of rape in India after the 2012 Delhi gang rape and the 2014 Badaun gang rape allegations, Prime Minister Narendra Modi advised parents, during his Independence Day speech in August, not only to ask where their daughters are going, but to check on their sons, because "a rapist is also somebody's son". Another Indian politician, Mulayam Singh Yadav, opposing the introduction of the death penalty for rape, said in April "boys will be boys ... they commit mistakes", gaining considerable notoriety, while in June politician and former actor Tapas Paul said he would send his "boys" to rape women from an opposing party.

Krishna Majumdar of the National Federation of Indian Women wrote in July that the Delhi and Badaun attacks were "nothing less than landmarks for women in India – landmarks in their consciousness of what men do, and can do, to them", and that "the machismo of the male, sexual assault or the fear of it, will not let women be truly free". The comic book Priya's Shakti (December 2014) featured a female Indian rape survivor as its hero; Priya is banished when her family learns about the rape, but with the help of the Hindu goddess Parvati, she rides back on a tiger and is victorious.

First Lady Michelle Obama delivered the weekly presidential address in May to highlight the Chibok schoolgirls kidnapping in Nigeria, in which around 270 schoolgirls were kidnapped by an Islamist group. She argued that it was not an isolated incident: "It's a story we see every day as girls around the world risk their lives to pursue their ambitions."

Women's allegations of assault or harassment at the hands of prominent men – including Bill Cosby in the United States and Jian Ghomeshi in Canada – added to the debate about the abuse of women by men in power, and the difficulty of reporting it and being believed. Scotland Yard's Operation Yewtree in the UK, an investigation triggered by the Jimmy Savile sexual abuse scandal, led to convictions for the sexual assault of women or girls against Max Clifford, Rolf Harris and Dave Lee Travis, all well-known men in the media and entertainment industry.

American football player Ray Rice was suspended by the NFL (later reversed) after video surfaced of him punching his female partner, and there were protests in the UK against soccer player Ched Evans being hired by another club after serving a jail sentence for rape. Australia, the UK and Singapore barred US-based dating coach Julien Blanc, after complaints that his aggressive techniques amounted to abuse of women.

=== Campus rape ===
In college campuses in the US, the idea of affirmative consent to sex was promoted, referred to as "yes means yes". In January, President Barack Obama launched the White House Task Force to Protect Students from Sexual Assault, and in September, California Governor Jerry Brown signed SB 967, legislation requiring colleges to adopt affirmative-consent policies. The new law defined consent to sex as an "affirmative, conscious, and voluntary agreement to engage in sexual activity"; lack of protest and silence would not constitute consent. Affirmative consent was criticized by Cathy Young who said government involvement in sexual activity was a "terrible idea" and that she did not believe this would protect against sexual assault.

In September at Columbia University in New York, art student Emma Sulkowicz began carrying a mattress with her on campus, in what she called Mattress Performance: Carry That Weight, in protest to the university's alleged mishandling of a rape complaint she had filed, where the student she accused was found "not responsible". The following month students at several universities in the US and Europe joined her protest against campus sexual assault, carrying mattresses on their campuses.

=== Online threats ===
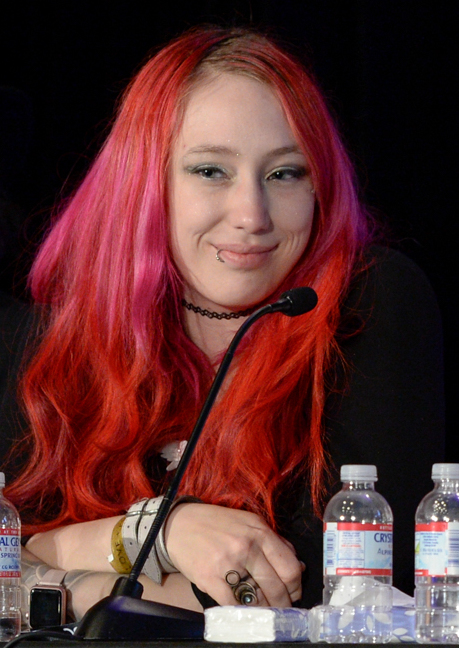
Video game developer Zoë Quinn received threats during the Gamergate controversy.

Online threats of violence against women were highlighted during Gamergate, a controversy about the treatment of women in video gaming. American video-game developers Zoë Quinn and Brianna Wu were forced to leave their homes after threats, as was media critic Anita Sarkeesian, who researches sexism in video games; Sarkeesian cancelled a lecture at Utah State University because, for legal reasons, it could not screen attendees for concealed weapons despite the threat of a school shooting if she spoke there.

=== Iran and Saudi Arabia ===
On Facebook, women in Iran posted images of themselves without veils in a movement known as My Stealthy Freedom. In Saudi Arabia in December, two women involved in the #womentodrive movement were arrested.

== Laws ==
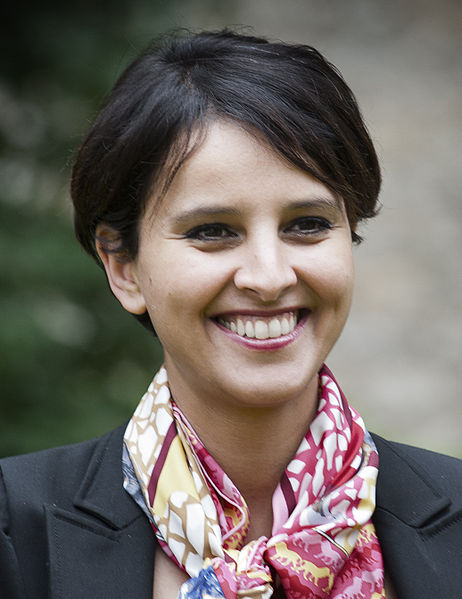
Then French Minister of Women's rights Najat Vallaud-Belkacem proposed the French gender equality law

In August, France passed what a New York Times editorial described as the most comprehensive law on gender equality in that country to date, Loi pour l'égalité réelle entre les femmes et les hommes. The law allows for abortion on demand in the first 12 weeks of pregnancy. Women previously had to be "in distress" to obtain an abortion. Provisions were changed to encourage more men to take paternal leave and requiring workplaces to improve gender equality or face fines. There are also several provisions to strengthen the fight against domestic abuse. Beauty pageants were forbidden for girls under 13 years of age, and the media was forbidden from portraying women in a sexist or demeaning way. The law also mandated gender quotas for the boards of sports organizations and public companies.

In September, Spain's Prime Minister, Mariano Rajoy, announced that the government would abandon a proposed law to strengthen the abortion law in Spain which would have banned abortions except in cases of rape or to protect the health of the mother. The proposal, which was introduced by the People Party's cabinet in December 2013, had been met with large protests through 2014.

In December 2014, Canada changed their prostitution laws to follow the Swedish model, which focuses prosecution on those who purchase sexual services. The purchasing and advertisement of sexual services became illegal (except for the advertisement by individual sex workers), while selling sex remained legal. The move was supported by a coalition of women's rights groups, the Women's Coalition for the Abolition of Prostitution, but was criticized by Human Rights Watch and the Feminist Coalition, who argued that it would force sex workers into isolated environments. A similar proposal was approved by the French National Assembly in 2013, but the Senate in 2014 did not pass the bill. Rosen Hitcher, a former prostitute and abolition advocate, walked 800 km (500 m) from Saintes, in southwestern France, to Paris to protest the Senate's decision. She was supported by Pascale Boistard, minister for women's rights, and the mayors of several cities, including Anne Hidalgo, the mayor of Paris.

== World Economic Forum, United Nations ==
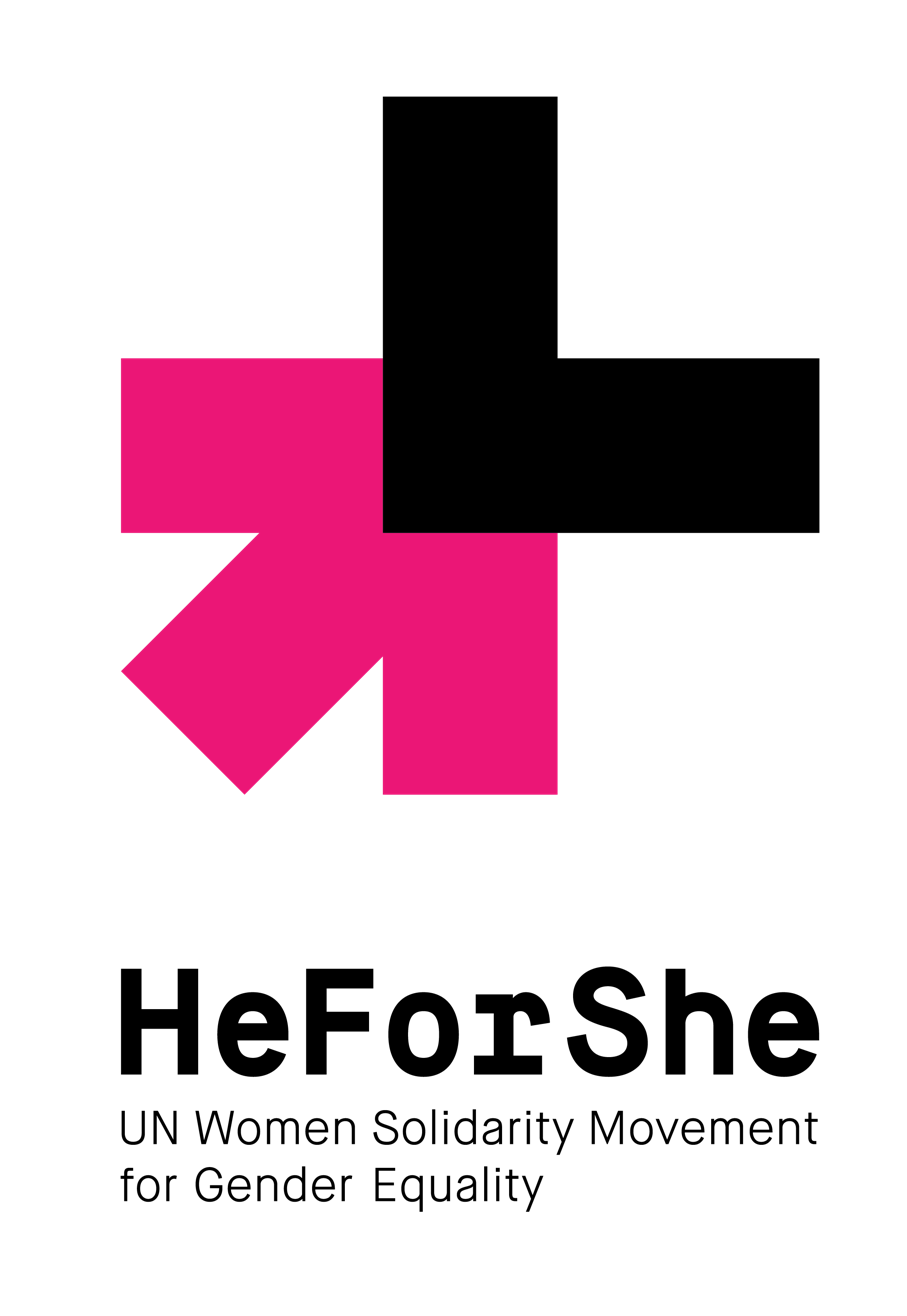
Emma Watson launched the UN's HeForShe campaign.

The World Economic Forum's 2014 Global Gender Gap Report, measuring the allocation of resources between women and men in health, education, economy and politics, ranked Iceland, Finland, Norway, Sweden and Denmark highest on their Global Gender Gap Index, while Yemen, Pakistan, Chad, Syria and Mali were among those ranked the lowest. Globally, the health and survival gap was 96% and the educational attainment gap was 94%, with some countries closing the gap entirely. However, the gap related to improvement for women in the workplace was found to be 60%, having closed by only 4% since 2006. Although it showed the most improvement, the political empowerment gap remained at just 21%.

During a visit to the UK in April, the United Nations' Special Rapporteur on Violence Against Women, Rashida Manjoo, criticized the country's "boys' club sexist culture". She argued that sexism in the UK was more "pervasive" and "in your face" than other countries she had visited, which included Algeria, Italy, Bosnia and Herzegovina, Azerbaijan, India and Croatia. She cited issues such the sexist portrayal of women in public, including the female nudity on Page Three of the Sun newspaper, bullying of girls in schools, and harassment in public spaces. Laura Bates, the founder of the Everyday Sexism Project, commented on Manjoo's criticisms calling them "a wake-up call to recognise the depth and severity of the problem. We still have gender inequality in the UK [yet] we are so quick to point the finger at other countries and suggest women [here] are equal."

In a July meeting with activists and journalists at the end of an investigatory visit, Manjoo heard complaints and criticized the Mexican government's record on gender inequality in public agencies, describing verbal harassment and sexual harassment as forms of violence against women. She said that violence against women "is acknowledged as a pervasive and widespread human rights violation" and that "no single country can claim that there is progressive elimination occurring". She said that two UN reports on the US in 2014 highlighted a disproportionate level of violence experienced by women from ethnic and racial minorities, mirroring findings in her own report of 2011 and similarly urging that the government do more to address the issue.

In June, UN special envoy Angelina Jolie and William Hague chaired the Global Summit to End Sexual Violence in Conflict in London, and the following month UNICEF and the UK government hosted the first Girl Summit, aimed at ending female genital mutilation and child marriage. UN Women Goodwill Ambassador Emma Watson launched the HeForShe campaign in September at the United Nations in New York, inviting men to sign up as advocates for women's rights.

The BBC reported that the role of women within the UN was increasing. As of November 2014, there were 31 female permanent representatives, and six seats (Argentina, Jordan, Lithuania, Luxembourg, Nigeria and the United States) out of fifteen on the Security Council were held by women. Most of the senior positions remained with men, including the current and all previous secretaries-general.

== Promotions and awards ==
Several women moved into prominent positions traditionally held by men. In January Mary Barra became the first female CEO of General Motors, in February Janet Yellen the first woman to chair the US Federal Reserve Board of Governors, in July Adm. Michelle J. Howard of the United States Navy the first female four-star admiral, and in December Libby Lane was the first woman chosen as a Church of England bishop.

In August, Iranian mathematician Maryam Mirzakhani won the Fields Medal for mathematics, the first woman to do so. Maj. Mariam al-Mansouri, the first female fighter pilot in the United Arab Emirates, led a mission in October against ISIS targets in Syria, though she became the target of sexist remarks in some American media. Malala Yousafzai, a 17-year-old Pakistani woman who was shot by the Taliban for her efforts to secure education for girls, shared the Nobel Peace Prize in December. Yousafzai is the youngest person ever to receive the award.

== See also ==
- Girl power
- Project Guardian
- Women's rights
- Women's empowerment
