= Opportunism =

Taking advantage of circumstances

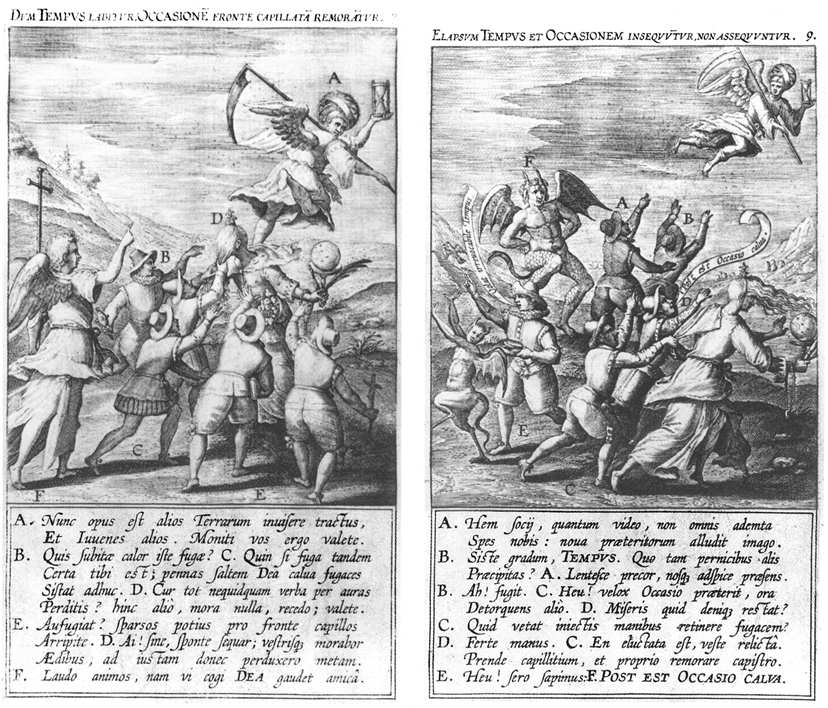
Opportunity Seized, Opportunity Missed, engraving by Theodoor Galle, 1605

Opportunism is the practice of taking advantage of circumstances — with little regard for principles or with what the consequences are for others. Opportunist actions are expedient actions guided primarily by self-interested motives. The term can be applied to individual humans and living organisms, groups, organizations, styles, behaviors and trends.

Opportunism or "opportunistic behaviour" is an important concept in such fields of study as biology, transaction cost economics, game theory, ethics, psychology, sociology and politics.

== Etymology ==
In the early 19th century, the term "opportunist" as a noun or adjective was already known and used in several European languages, but initially, it rarely referred to political processes or to a political tendency. The English term "opportunism" is possibly borrowed originally from the Italian expression opportunismo. In 19th-century Italian politics, it meant "exploiting the prevailing circumstances or opportunities to gain an immediate advantage for oneself or one's own group". However, it is more likely that the English expression was directly borrowed from the French term, when it began to refer specifically to the opportunist Republicans, since the term first entered the English language in the early 1870s. In this sense the meaning "opportunism" has mutated: from those who claimed to advocate a principle (in the original French case, an amnesty for the Communards) but said that the time was not yet "opportune", to what may be thought of as the opposite – those who act without principle.

== Marxism ==
From a Marxist-Leninist perspective, opportunism is a deviation from proletarian revolutionary politics that adapts Marxism to non-proletarian pressures. It can appear in two main forms: Right-opportunism, which liquidates revolutionary politics in favor of reformism, class collaboration, and accommodation to bourgeois legality; and “Left”-opportunism, which dresses itself in militant language but substitutes adventurism, sectarian purity, or refusal of necessary tactics for concrete revolutionary work among the masses. Lenin treats both as deviations from Marxism, but he repeatedly identifies Right-opportunism, revisionism, and social-chauvinism as the principal danger inside the workers’ movement under imperialism.

Right-opportunism is the tendency to revise Marxism in the direction of liberalism, parliamentarism, economism, gradualism, or class compromise. In Lenin’s polemics, this means stripping Marxism of its revolutionary content while preserving its terminology. In The State and Revolution, Lenin argues that bourgeois ideologists and opportunists “doctor” Marxism by obscuring its revolutionary side, especially Marx’s teaching on the state, revolution, and the dictatorship of the proletariat. Stalin’s Foundations of Leninism gives the same Marxist-Leninist reading of the Second International: its opportunists adapted themselves to the bourgeoisie, while even many “orthodox” Marxists adapted themselves to the opportunists for the sake of unity, allowing opportunism to dominate. In practice, Right-opportunism may support reforms, elections, unions, or legal struggle, but it treats these as substitutes for revolutionary struggle rather than subordinate forms of it.

“Left”-opportunism, by contrast, mistakes radical phraseology for revolutionary strategy. Lenin’s “Left-Wing” Communism: An Infantile Disorder criticizes communists who refused participation in reactionary trade unions, rejected parliamentary work in all circumstances, or treated compromise as inherently treasonous. His point is not that communists should become moderate, but that revolutionary politics requires disciplined tactical flexibility and connection to the actual working masses. From the Marxist-Leninist standpoint, “Left” opportunists often leap over concrete conditions: they confuse subjective militancy with objective revolutionary possibility, isolate themselves from the proletariat, and replace patient organization with gestures of purity. Lenin therefore treats “Left” communism as a real error, though usually as a secondary danger compared with Menshevism, opportunism, and social-chauvinism.

The Marxist-Leninist distinction is therefore not “moderate versus radical.” Both Right- and “Left”-opportunism are anti-Leninist because both break the unity of revolutionary theory and concrete practice. Right-opportunism tails existing bourgeois institutions and backward consciousness; “Left”-opportunism runs ahead of the masses and abandons the work needed to win them. Mao’s later Marxist-Leninist writings make a similar point by associating opportunism and adventurism with errors in the relation between knowledge and practice; in his framing, both dogmatism and empiricism can detach politics from concrete reality. A Marxist-Leninist account therefore condemns Right-opportunism for surrendering the revolutionary goal, and “Left”-opportunism for sabotaging the revolutionary path through impatience, sectarianism, and abstract militancy.

== Human behaviour ==
In human behavior, opportunism concerns the relationship between people's actions and their basic principles when faced with opportunities and challenges. The opportunist (or "chancer") seeks to gain a personal advantage when an opportunity presents itself, putting self-interest ahead of some other interest, in a way contrary either to a previously established principle or to another principle seen as having higher priority. Hence societies usually regard opportunist behavior at least as questionable or dubious, and at most as unjustifiable or completely illegitimate. Opportunism is generally regarded as unhealthy, as a disorder or as a character deficiency, if selfishly pursuing an opportunity is blatantly anti-social (involves disregard for the needs, wishes and interests of others). However, scholars can label behavior as "opportunist" without making or implying any particular moral evaluation — simply identifying a type of self-interested behavior.

== Use of the term in specific areas ==
- Intellectual opportunism
- Sexual opportunism – Selfish pursuit of sexual opportunities for one's own sake
- Political opportunism – Practice of taking advantage of every situation to maintain political influence
- Economic opportunism
- Legal opportunism
- Spiritual opportunism – Exploitation of spiritual ideas

== See also ==
- Business opportunity – Sale or lease enabling the start of a business
- Corruption – Dishonest or fraudulent conduct by those in power
- Enlightened self-interest – Ethical philosophy
- Individualism – Concept regarding the moral worth of the individual
- Jeitinho brasileiro – Brazilian cultural convention
- Meritocracy – Political system in which capital is assigned on the basis of competence
- Opportunity cost – Benefit lost by a choice between options
- Positive accounting – Branch of accounting research
