= Manjoo =

Manjoo is a surname. Notable people with the surname include:

- Farhad Manjoo (born 1978), South Africa-born American journalist and writer
- Rashida Manjoo, South African United Nations official
