= Women in Chad =

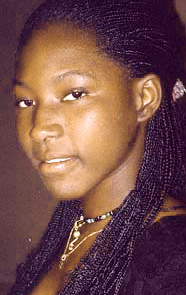
- A Sara girl from Chad

General statistics
- Maternal mortality (per 100,000): 1,140 (2017)
- Women in parliament: 12.8% (2012)
- Women over 25 with secondary education: NA
- Women in labour force: 64.4% (2011)

Gender Inequality Index
- Value: 0.652 (2021)
- Rank: 165th out of 191

Global Gender Gap Index
- Value: 0.579 (2022)
- Rank: 142nd out of 146

Women in Chad, a landlocked country in Central Africa, are the mainstay of its predominantly rural-based economy and they outnumber the men. Chad is a country with diverse and rich cultural practices, such as male beauty pageants (judged by women) and long-kept-secret hair products. Despite their numbers in the general population, there are very few women in governmental positions and gender equality is far from being a reality in Chad. Chad is rated by the World Bank as the third least gender equal country in Africa. Additionally, there are few women who attain higher education, and many who receive a college degree do so outside of the country.

Women face discrimination and violence. Female genital mutilation, while technically illegal, is still widely practiced. Child marriage and adolescent pregnancy are commonly practiced, although some policies have been implemented to combat them. Extrajudicial killings, beatings, torture, and rape were committed by security forces and other abuses with "near total" impunity. Amnesty International has reported that "the widespread insecurity in eastern Chad had particularly severe consequences for women, who suffered grave human rights abuses, including rape, during attacks on villages" by Janjawid militia from Sudan.

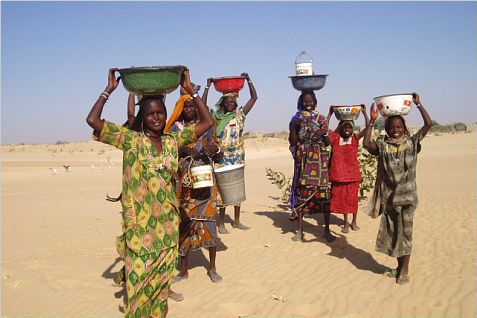
Mao Women

== Education ==
Despite government's efforts, overall educational levels remained low at the end of the first decade of independence. In 1971, about 99 percent of women over the age of fifteen could not read, write, or speak French, which at the time was the only official national language; literacy in Arabic stood at 7.8 percent. In 1982, the overall literacy rate stood at about 15 percent.

Major problems have hindered the development of Chadian education since independence. Financing for education has been very limited. Limited facilities and personnel also have made it difficult for the education system to provide adequate instruction. Overcrowding is a major problem, with some classes having up to 100 students, many of whom are repeaters. In the years just after independence, many primary school teachers had only marginal qualifications. On the secondary level, the situation was even worse.

In 2004, 39.6 percent of children aged 5 to 14 were attending school. Educational opportunities for girls are limited, mainly due to cultural traditions. Fewer girls enroll in secondary school than boys, primarily due to early marriage. In 1999, 54.0 percent of children who started primary school reached grade 5.

== Cultural Practices ==
There is a wide range of cultural traditions among the many ethnic groups within Chad.

=== Chebe ===
Chebe powder is a hair-care product used by rural women of the Basara Arab ethnic group in Chad. It is made from ground up natural herbs and ingredients, some of which are derived from plants unique to the region. These Bassara Arab women use Chebe as a protective styling agent, and credit the product as the secret to their famously long and healthy hair. The ground-up powder is roasted then mixed with hair oil or animal fat. It is applied liberally to hair several times per month, to hydrate it. The hair is then braided for further protection. The frequent Chebe application and hair-braiding is also a community bonding event for the women in these rural Basara groups. Some western beauty companies have used Chebe powder as a selling point in their hair-care products, but it is unclear whether or not these products contain genuine Chebe.

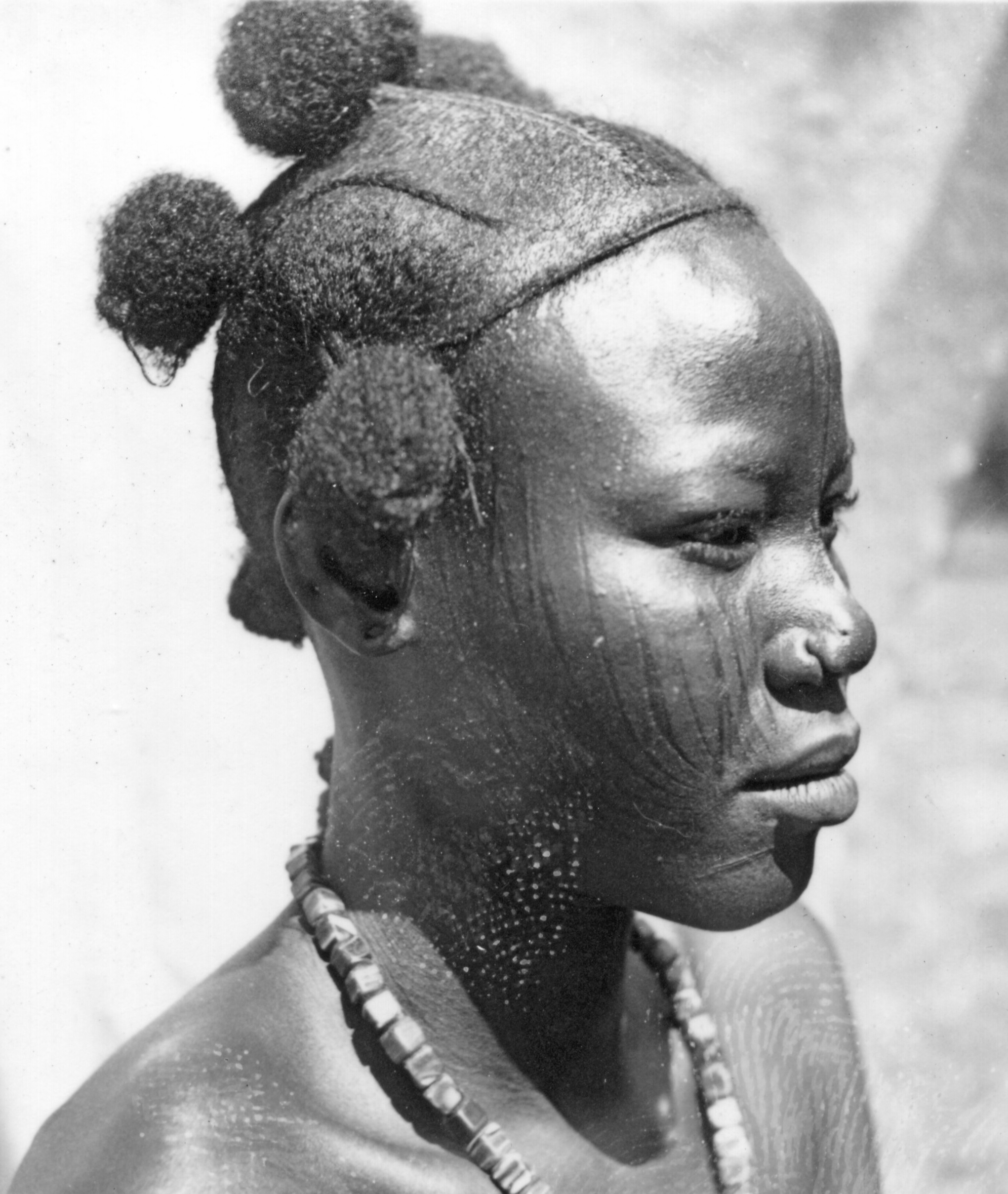
African scarification circa 1943

=== Facial Scarring and Adornment ===
Facial scarring has been a common practice in Chad and the surrounding region for many decades. The nature of the scarring is extremely varied throughout the region, so there is no single style followed. Some are opposed to facial scarring especially on children, as children are often scarred as infants. Much of the pushback has also stemmed from the AIDS epidemic, as some religious leaders have refused to use a fresh blade with each new client.

A now relatively out-dated practice in the Sara tribe was to wear decorative facial jewelry that stretched the lips and skin.

=== Clothing ===
Traditional women's clothing styles in Chad can be separated into two general cultural categories: that of Muslim women and that of non-Muslim women. Muslim women in Chad typically dress similarly to Muslim women around the globe. This consists of wearing robes that cover the body and a hijab and/or niqāb. A traditional style for Non-Muslim women is to wear a short-sleeved shirt, along with a pagne (or body wrap) which covers the upper and lower parts of the body, and decorative scarf called a lafai. Sandals are a common footwear worn by Chadian women.

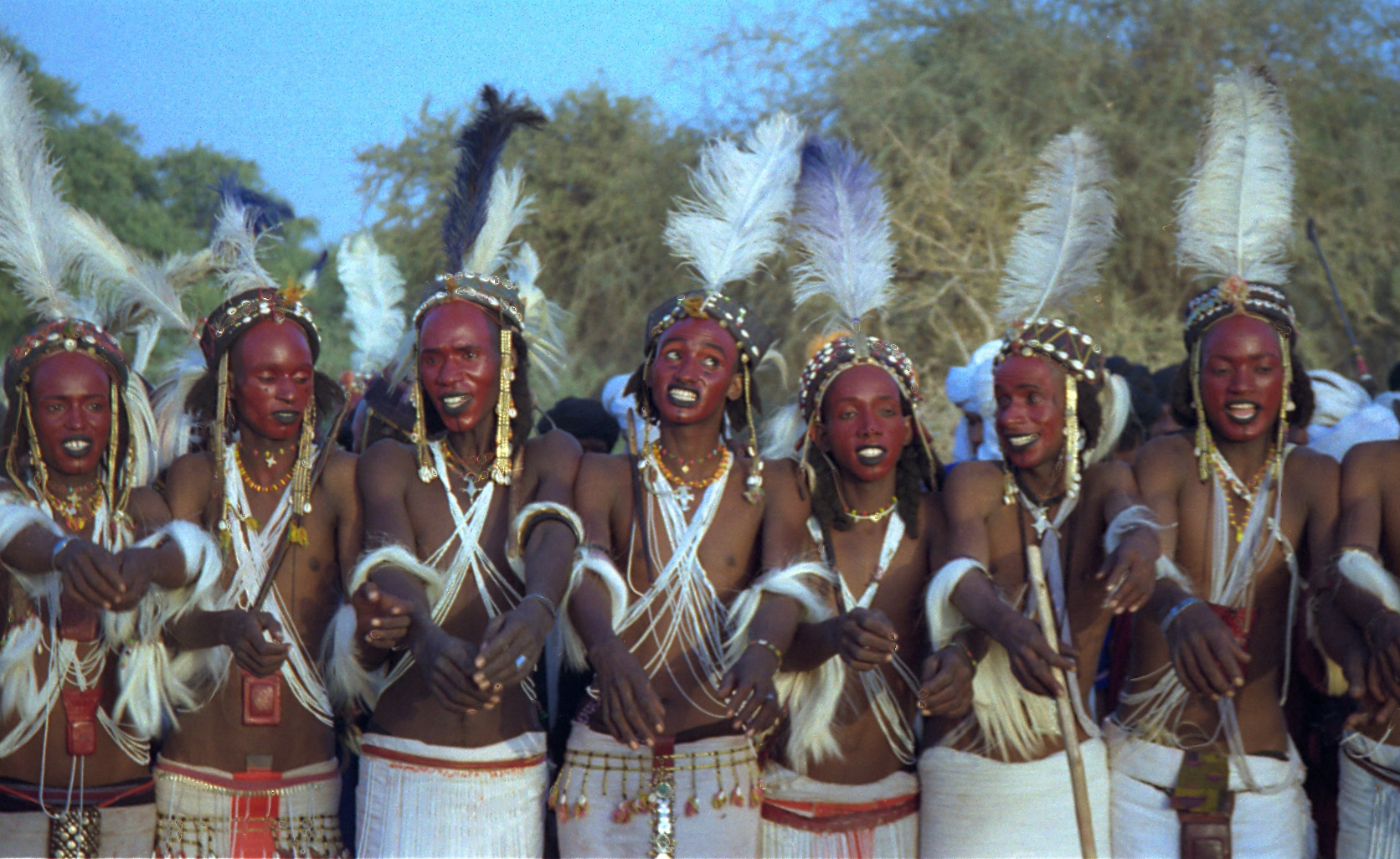
By Dan Lundberg - 1997 #274-24 Gerewol, CC BY-SA 2.0

=== Pageants ===
Gerewol (var. Guerewol, Guérewol) is an annual cultural festival of the semi-nomadic Wodaabe people across Niger and Chad. It takes place each year at the end of the rainy season in September. The festival is centered around a courtship ritual beauty pageant, but unlike traditional western pageants the competitors are male. The men adorn themselves in dramatic makeup and flashy garments to attract the attentions of female suitors, and the women are responsible for judging their beauty.

== Family Structure ==
=== Early Marriage ===
In Chad, the mean age of women at their first marriage is 16, but experts believe the median age is likely even lower. Traditionally, girls in Chad are seen as women once they reach reproductive age, and immediately become candidates for marriage to bachelors in their respective communities. According to the World Fertility Report in 2013, the average (mean) age of women in Chad at their first pregnancy was 18.2, but the median age for this figure is also expected to be somewhat lower. The structure of promoting marriage is perpetuated by religious organizations, as over 73% of the population is Catholic or Muslim.

=== Polygamy ===
Polygamy is legal in Chad, and it is estimated that over a third of women live in polygamous marriages. Men in Chad often take multiple wives in order to maximize the number of offspring they can produce, because having large families is seen as virtuous, in traditional culture. Ordinance No. 03/INT/SUR of 1961 states that polygamy is legal as long as "spouses do not renounce it when signing the marriage contract". Knowledge about and access to contraceptives is scarce, which also contributes to high levels of poverty and child mortality, resulting from families' inability to provide for their children. Polygamy is, however, not limited to rural areas or remote communities; former President Idriss Déby publicly had multiple wives. During his presidency, he married Hinda Déby Itno who eventually was designated as the First Lady out of his eight known wives.

=== Adolescent Pregnancy ===
Because girls are often married once they reach reproductive age in Chad, adolescent pregnancy is much more common than in other places. In Chad, the rate of childbirth for girls under the age of 15 is 47.8 out of 1,000, and nearly 14% of women in Chad have a child by this age. In addition to the potential financial problems faced by young mothers in poor countries with high fertility rates, medical experts warn against the increased physical risks associated with adolescent pregnancy—especially in regions with limited access to healthcare such as rural Chad.

Chad has a large number of nomadic and isolated communities which makes it much more difficult to ensure consistent healthcare access for all members of the population. This problem is exacerbated by nation-wide financial troubles that forced the government to cut the per-capita healthcare spending by nearly 20% from 2014 to 2015. Of the working healthcare facilities in Chad, only 18% are able to provide emergency neonatal and obstetric care (EmONC).

In Nigeria—one of Chad's neighboring countries—the maternal mortality rate among adolescents (ages 15–19) is more than double the maternal mortality rate of adult mothers (ages 20–34). Although it has decreased in recent years, Chad still has the second highest maternal mortality rate of any African country, topped on.ly by South Sudan. According to the data collected by the World Bank in 2015, 54.7% of pregnant Chadian women were receiving prenatal care from a skilled health professional. This is a significant increase from 38.9% in 2004, but Chad is still far underperforming in this area as compared to neighboring countries of Niger, Sudan, and Libya which reported rates closer to 80 or 90 percent.

It is difficult for women in Chad's rural communities to access healthcare and education regarding safe sex practices, as well as information on what proper prenatal care is needed during pregnancy. A weak education system is partially responsible for the lack of knowledge around contraceptives and women's healthcare practices in Chad, as very few women between the ages of 15 and 24 are literate. This age range is crucial to the discussion of contraception because traditionally, females in Chad are seen as women once they reach childbearing age (typically around 13–16 years old).

== Women's rights ==
=== Human trafficking ===
Chad is a source and destination country for children subjected to trafficking in persons, specifically conditions of forced labor and forced prostitution. The country's trafficking problem is primarily internal and frequently involves parents entrusting children to relatives or intermediaries in return for promises of education, apprenticeship, goods, or money; selling or bartering children into involuntary domestic servitude or herding, as a means of survival by families seeking to reduce the number of mouths to feed.

Underage Chadian girls travel to larger towns in search of work, where some are subsequently subjected to prostitution. Some girls are compelled to marry against their will, only to be forced by their husbands into involuntary domestic servitude or agricultural labor. In past reporting periods, traffickers transported children from Cameroon and the CAR to Chad's oil producing regions for commercial sexual exploitation; it is unknown whether this practice persisted in 2009.

=== Female genital mutilation ===
60 percent of Chadian women had been subjected to female genital mutilation in 1995. The procedure is a traditional rite of passage as a girl moves into adulthood and it is followed regardless of religious orientation. It is equally common amongst Muslims, Christians and animists. Those who attain adulthood without being mutilated generally avoid it for life. Over 80 percent of the girls in Chad who suffered genital mutilation were cut between the age of 5 and 14.

=== Gender Gap Report ===
In 2012, the World Economic Forum ranked Chad as the third worst country on the continent for gender inequality in their Global Gender Gap Report, with an index score of 0.58 (1 is complete equality and 0 is complete inequality).

== Women in Politics ==
After President Idriss Déby was killed on April 20, 2021, there was a coup which led to the dismissal of the National Assembly. The ruling military junta is now responsible for the functions previously handled by the National Assembly. Prior to its dissolution, the National Assembly consisted of 188 members, 28 of whom were women.

When the military junta took power, they named 93 people who would act as the interim parliament—called the Conseil Militaire de Transition (CMT)—until the next election cycle. The members were chosen according to a list of quotas which required that at least 30% of members must come from the preceding National Assembly, 30% must be women, and 30% must be youths. The list of all CMT members can be found at this link.

The presence of quotas for women in government is a relatively new practice, and is part of a greater women's rights and gender equality movement that has grown in popularity over the last decade. The goal of complete gender equality is still far from realized in Chad, and it is still rare to find women in highly influential positions in government. There is a deep cultural history around the woman's role as a mother, which has made the project of gender equality much more difficult to implement.

=== Historical Political Figures ===
See linked pages for more information.

Fatimé Kimto (died May 21, 2015) was a Chadian politician. She was the first woman to serve in a cabinet position in the country's history. She was first named to the cabinet in 1982, becoming the Minister of Social Affairs and Women; she remained in the post until 1984. Her last post was as the Minister of Civil Service, Labor, and Employment.

Achta Toné Gossingar (1 July 1941 – 23 November 2011) was the first female minister in the government of Idriss Déby; she went on to become a public health advocate, working in preventing death rates from AIDS and maternal death before her death in a plane crash in 2011.

Elise Loum (born 1956, Chad) was a vice-president of the African Union's Pan-African Parliament from 2004 to 2009.

Bourkou Louise Kabo (5 July 1934 – 13 June 2019) was a Chadian politician. She was the first woman to be elected to the National Assembly of Chad.

Kalthouma Nguembang was a Chadian politician, who was an early member of the Chadian Progressive Party (PPT). She was elected to the National Assembly of Chad in 1968, but was later imprisoned by François Tombalbaye who accused her of plotting against him.

=== Current/Recent Political Figures ===
See linked pages for more information.

Lydie Beaassemda (born c. 1967) is a Chadian politician. Since 2 May 2021, she has been Minister of Higher Education and Research under Chad's Transitional Military Council. She is also a leading member of the Party for Democracy and Full Independence (PDI), founded by her father, and she has headed the party since his death in 2018.

Amina Priscille Longoh (born 1991) is a Chadian humanitarian organizer and politician. She has served in the government of Chad as Minister of Women and the Protection of early childhood since July 2020. She is one of the main women's rights activists in Chad.

Hinda Déby Itno (born 5 April 1980) is a former Chadian First Lady who served from 2005 until the death of her husband, President Idriss Déby, in April 2021. She has been an advocate for ending the AIDS epidemic in Chad, and was named a UNAIDS "Special Ambassador" for the Prevention of HIV and the Protection and Health of Adolescents.

Aziza Baroud (born August 4, 1965) is a Chadian politician who has served in various senior government positions such as Minister for Public Health & National Solidarity, and Minister for the Economy. Baroud has been the Permanent Representative to the United Nations since 2019, and is on the Religions for Peace Secretary General's Advisory Council. In 1989, she received a master's degree in applied economics from the Université Paris Dauphine.

== Laws, Policy, and Advocacy ==
Chad has signed and ratified the Convention on the Elimination of All Forms of Discrimination against Women, the Convention against Torture and Other Cruel, Inhuman or Degrading Treatment or Punishment, the Convention on the Rights of the Child and the Optional Protocol to the Convention on the Rights of the Child on the Sale of Children, Child Prostitution and Child Pornography.

External Aid

Several external organizations, including the UN, have offered their assistance to Chad in the spirit of improving equality and human rights. One example of this is the African Development Bank Group's project for Girls Education and Women's Literacy (PEFAF).

Recent Policy

On March 14, 2015, the President of Chad launched a campaign to end child marriage by outlawing the forceful marriage of minors under the age of 18, making such a marriage punishable by 5–10 years in prison, along with major fines. This decree has not completely ended child marriage, but it is a positive indication of the country's commitment to reduce harm against women and girls.

=== SENAFET ===
SENAFET stands for the Semaine Nationale des Femmes Tchadienne or in English, National Chadian Women's week. The theme of the 2022 SENAFET is “l’autonomisation de la femme tchadienne passe par son implication dans la vie politique, économique et sociale du pays,” which translates to “Giving the Chadian woman autonomy through her involvement in political, economic, and societal life in Chad."

Goals of SENAFET:

- Il faut inciter les jeunes filles à fréquenter l’école et à poursuivre leurs études supérieures --> education for children
- Il faut rester mobiliser face aux défis de notre société pour apporter votre pierre de construction --> creating a strong cultural foundation
- Il faut porter des réflexions qui anticipent le changement --> think ahead of and plan for change
- Il faut être positif dans vos choix pour préserver la paix et la quiétude nationale --> Be confident in your choices to preserve national peace

== See also ==
- Women in Africa
