= Fatimé Dordji =

Chadian businesswoman and journalist (1949–2016)

Fatimé Dordji, also known as Fatimé N'Dordji (14 July 1949 – 30 November 2016) was a Chadian businesswoman and journalist. She was the first woman from the country to be employed as a radio announcer.

== Biography ==
Dordji was born on 14 July 1949 in Ati, Chad. She was brought up in the town of Sarh by her mother, who was an Arab, and her step-father, who worked as a soldier. At the age of fourteen she moved to the capital N’Djamena, where she was employed as a radio announcer, due to her knowledge of both French and Arabic. She was the first woman to be employed in such a role. By 1965, she was a well-known radio personality on Radiodiffusion Tchadienne. The same year she married a policeman, and future politician, named Senoussi Khater, with whom she went on to have seven children.

In 1973, Dordji came to be considered an enemy of the state, as she had named one of her daughters after the politician Kalthouma Nguembang, who President François Tombalbaye had accused of trying to use witchcraft against him. She was imprisoned and then subsequently detained by police for over twenty-one months, although she was never formally charged with criminal activities.

In 1975, Félix Malloum overthrew Tombalbaye, and Dordji's husband was appointed Ambassador to Libya in the new government. From 1978 to 1981, the family lived in Belgium. However during this period she and her husband divorced: he returned to Chad as Minister of Education in the new government, she moved to Libya.

In the 1990s, under the new government of Idriss Déby, Dordji returned to Chad - working first as a radio presenter, and subsequently as a businesswoman. She died on 30 November 2016.
