= Dubravka Šimonović =

Croatian jurist and human rights scholar

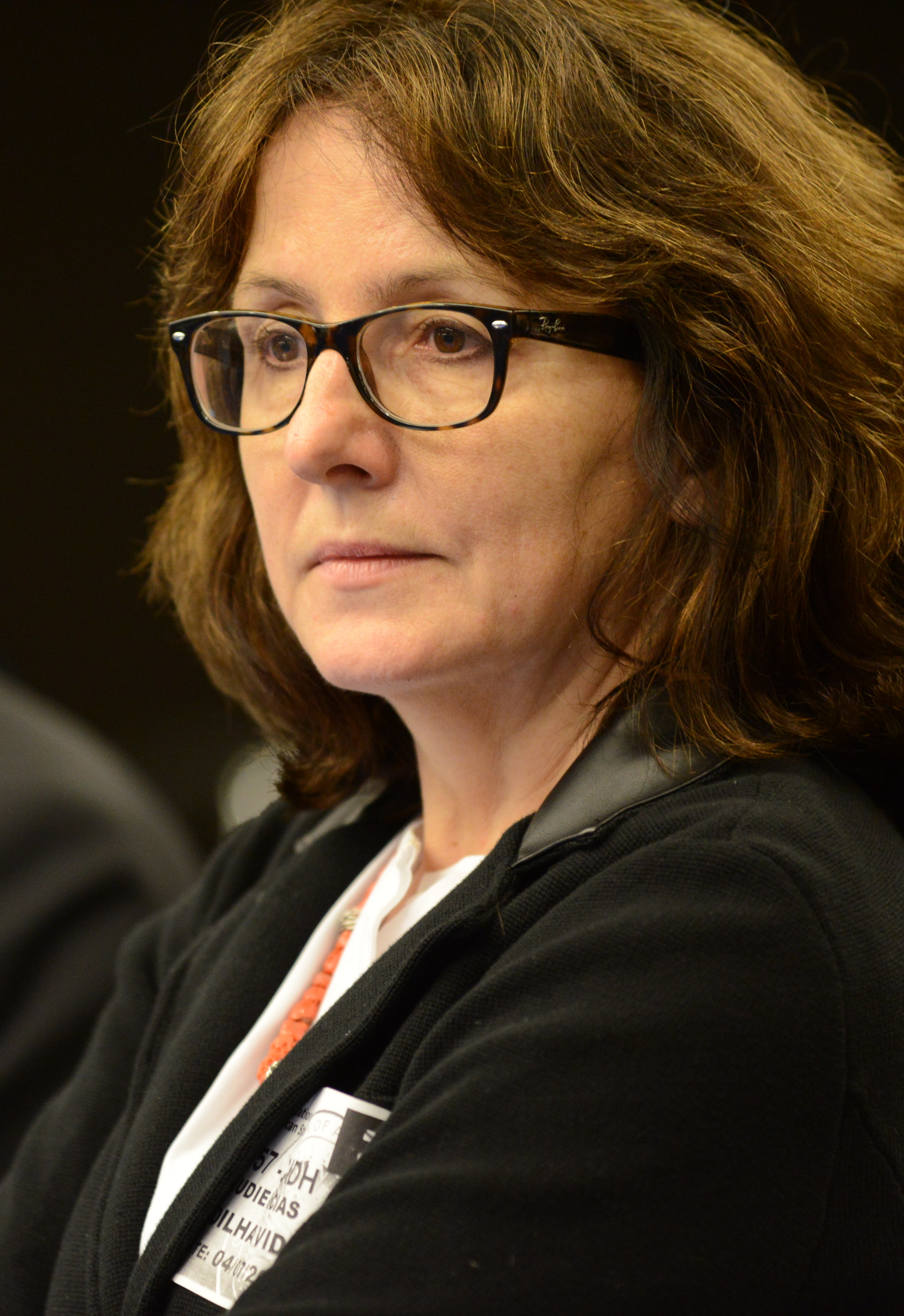
Dubravka Šimonović in 2016

Dubravka Šimonović (born 1958) is a Croatian jurist and specialist in human rights. She was appointed on 1 August 2015 as the United Nations Special Rapporteur on Violence Against Women, and is visiting professor in practice in the Centre for Women, Peace and Security at the London School of Economics.

Šimonović was born in Zagreb. She has a master's degree and a doctorate in family law, both from the University of Zagreb.

Šimonović was questioned as to why she chose to visit Australia and the Bahamas, nations with low rates of violence against women or low population respectively, to investigate violence against women as part of her work as a UN Special Rapporteur on Violence Against Women rather than nations with high levels of violence or large population.
