= Bourkou Louise Kabo =

Chadian politician (1934–2019)

- Born: Kabo; 5 July 1934 (age 91)
- Citizenship: Chad
- Occupation: Politician
- Parents: Zara Lawassi (father); Koutou Kilagui (mother)

Bourkou Louise Kabo (5 July 1934 – 13 June 2019) was a Chadian politician. She was

the first woman to be elected to the National Assembly of Chad.

== Early life ==
Kabo was born on 5 July 1934 in the Southern Chadian town of Sarh. She was a member of the Sara people and was raised as a Muslim. Her father, Zara Lawassi, was a postal and telecommunications worker who died 40 days after her birth. Her mother, Koutou Kilagui, worked as a trader and took Kabo to N'Djamena so she could be educated. Kilagui was criticized by some of her Muslim friends for enrolling her daughter in a French school, but she insisted that she wanted one of her children to receive a good education, since her other four children died. She died in 1942, and Kabo's extended family paid her school tuition to honor her mother.

Her aunt was a maid for a colonial officer. Once she was accused of stealing a watch, beaten by guards and stripped her of her clothes, all in front of the young Kabo. Her uncle was killed by the government after being beaten up. These brutal acts affected the young Kabo deeply, and she joined her aunt's Protestant church despite her Muslim background. After primary school, she attended a teacher's school in Moundou. There, she became acquainted with the Frenchwoman Jeanne Vial, who offered to pay for her to study in France. However, colonial governor Marie-Jacques Rogue did not allow Kabo to leave Chad since her parents did not support his party. Nonetheless, Kabo became the first Chadian woman to teach in schools where the main language of instruction was French. In 1951, she married Julien Djasgaral and had seven children. They soon divorced due to his alcoholism and disapproval of Kabo's political ambitions.

== Political career ==
Kabo joined the Parti Progressiste Tchadien, where her Sara background aided her entry into politics. They chose her to run for parliament in 1962. She became the first woman elected to the parliament of Chad that year. She later recalled that her opinions were respected in the assembly despite being the only woman there. She supported François Tombalbaye despite his authoritarian governance. After Tombalbeye dismissed the parliament in 1964, Kabo and PPT colleague Kalthouma Nguembang visited the United States, Israel, and Madagascar. In the U.S., she received some support to establish a mothers' school. Kabo also recruited female teachers in travels through rural Chad. Her second husband, Alphone Ndoyengar Nodjimbang, was named secretary of education by Tombalbeye.

She refused to support Tombalbaye during his cultural revolution in the early 1970s, modeled after that of Mobutu Sese Seko. She was not fond of his decision to mandate all men to be circumcised, or his reliance on Haitian advisors. However, she later said he was the best leader of Chad that there was and his later behavior was a deviation from his earlier rule. After he was killed in 1975, she worked in the Ministry of Education until 1977.

== Exile and later career ==
In 1979 during the civil war in Chad, she ran away to Doba, losing all of her possessions in her flight. In 1982 she left for the Central African Republic when Hissène Habré came to power, and worked as a food trader and teacher in Bangui. In 1987 she went to France as a political refugee and became interested in the education of the handicapped. She returned to Chad in 1991 after Hissène Habré was overthrown by Idriss Deby. There she served as a deputy in the parliament from 1991 to 1995, as well as being a delegate to the constitutional convention. She was a critic of female circumcision and child marriage, calling for a minimum age of 18 to be married. She also founded a chapter of the Special Olympics, acting as its president after 2000.
