= Kalthouma Nguembang =

Chadian politician

- Citizenship: Chad
- Occupation: Politician
- Known for: Member of National Assembly (Chad)
- Political party: Chadian Progressive Party

Kalthouma Nguembang was a Chadian politician, who was an early member of the Chadian Progressive Party (PPT). She was elected to the National Assembly of Chad in 1968, but was later imprisoned by François Tombalbaye who accused her of plotting against him.

== Biography ==
Nguembang was born in Chad some time in the early twentieth century, her date of birth is unknown and little is known about her early life. However it is known that one of her cousins was Félix Malloum, who became President of Chad from 1975 to 1978.

According to reports from the colonial French government, Nguembang joined the Chadian Progressive Party early on. The leader of the CPP, Gabriel Lisette, acknowledged her as an important figure in the early years of the party. In 1949 François Tombalbaye also praised Nguembang's effort in a speech in N’Djamena. She encouraged members of Chad's Sara people, to which she belonged, to vote for the CPP and spoke out for their rights.

Nguembang was also an activist for women's rights in Chad and became the leader of the Women's Section of the Chadian Progressive Party - first for the southern region and then in the 1960s for the party as a whole. Interested in agricultural policy, Nguembang was critical of the government policy of mandatory cotton cultivation, which many farmers were opposed to.

In 1963, Nguembang was elected to the National Assembly. In 1964, she visited the United States, with Bourkou Louise Kabo, as part of a delegation of Chadian parliamentarians. However by 1968 she was the only woman in the National Assembly.

In 1959, Tombalbaye succeeded Lisette as leader of the CPP and initially he and Nguembang were allies, unlike his relations with other women members of the party, like Hadjé Halimé, who he had imprisoned and tortured. However, Nguembang was imprisoned from 1968 to 1969. On her release from prison she made leader of the Women's Section of their party, a post she held until 1973. That year, Tombalbaye accused her of plotting against him and she was arrested. The plot was said to have involved the hiring of diviners, who would unleash supernatural powers against Tombalbaye. She was dismissed from all government positions and put on trial, alongside thirty others. Tombalbaye purportedly took this action as he opposed Nguembang's support of students. After her arrest, any connection with Nguembang made those associated her enemies of the state. For radio presenter, Fatimé Dordji, who had named her daughter after Nguembang, this meant arrest and prison. On 9 April 1973, Nguembang was sentenced to seven years imprisoned with hard labour. During her imprisonment she was tortured.

After Toumbalbaye was murdered in the 1975 Chadian coup, Nguembang was released from prison. After her release, she took no further part in politics and emigrated to Nigeria, where she died.

== Personal life ==
Nguembang married Tahir Abdeldjelil, who was a member of the Chadian Progressive Party and related to the sultanate of Wadai.

== Historiography ==
The important role of women in Chad's early political development has been severely neglected and sometimes erased - Nguembang's role in its early politics is an example of this erasure.
