= Sexual opportunism =

Selfish pursuit of sexual opportunities for one's own sake

Sexual opportunism is the selfish pursuit of sexual opportunities for one's own sake when they arise, often with the negative moral connotation that it, in some way it "takes advantage" of others, or "makes use" of, or "exploits", other persons for sexual purposes. Sexual opportunism is sometimes also defined as the use of sexual favours for selfish purposes unrelated to the sexual activity, in which case taking a sexual opportunity is merely the means to achieve a quite different purpose, for example, to advance one's career or obtain status or money.

A study of women's fertile-phase sexuality found out that compared to the luteal phase, fertile women may show more interest in sexual opportunism, specifically meaning that they may be willing to engage in and have interest in sex with attractive men, even if they do not know each other well.

== See also ==
- Casual sex – Certain types of human sexual activity as alternative to a romantic relationship
- Opportunism – Taking advantage of circumstances
- Sexual harassment – Unwanted sexual attention or advances
- Sex tourism – Travel to engage in sexual activity
