= Intellectual opportunism =

Intellectual opportunism is the pursuit of intellectual opportunities with a selfish, ulterior motive not consistent with relevant principles. The term refers to certain self-serving tendencies of the human intellect, often involving professional producers and disseminators of ideas, who work with idea-formation all the time.

Intellectual opportunism sometimes also refers to a specific school or trend of thought, or to a characteristic of a particular intellectual development. Thus, a certain set of people who share ideas are then said to display a tendency for "intellectual opportunism", often with the connotation that they deliberately act intellectually in a certain way, to gain special favor with an authority, group or organization; to justify a state of affairs that benefits themselves; or because they have the motive of financial or personal gain.

== Background ==
At issue is the motive and intention involved in pursuing, creating, or expressing particular ideas (why certain ideas are being taken up), and the relevant contrast is between:

- the intellectual's stated principles, versus ideas he publicly or outwardly supports, endorses or concerns himself with.
- the original intention of ideas such as it is normally understood, versus the uses they are put to.

"Theoretical opportunism" in science refers to the attempt to save a theory from refutation, or protect it from criticism, with the use of ad hoc methods that in some way lack deeper scientific consistency or credibility. Theorists may believe so strongly in the value of their own theory, that they try to explain away inconsistencies or contrary evidence – borrowing any idea that plausibly fits with the theory, rather than developing the theory in such a way, that it can truly account for the relevant evidence.

The phenomenon of intellectual opportunism is frequently associated by its critics with careerism and dubious, unprincipled self-promotion, where ideas become "just another commodity" or a "bargaining tool". When human knowledge becomes a tradeable good in a market of ideas, all sorts of opportunities arise for huckstering, swindling, haggling and hustling with information in ways which are regarded as unprincipled, dubious or involve deceit of some sort.

== Morality ==
The intellectual opportunist adapts his intellectual concerns, pursuits and utterances to "fit with the trend/fashion" or "fit the situation" or "with what sells" – with the (ulterior) motive of gaining personal popularity/support, protecting intellectual coherence, obtaining personal credit, acquiring privilege or status, persuading others, ingratiating himself, taking advantage or making money. Normally this assumes some degree of intellectual flexibility, agility or persuasiveness. The intellectual opportunist:

- "Holds his mouth where the money or the support is" or where the opportunities for self-advancement or self-promotion are.
- "Hires out" his own ideas for purposes that conflict with his real nature or the organization he works for, only for the purpose of gaining personal advantage.
- Latches onto any readily available ideas or "picks the brains of others" to advance or defend his own position.
- Compromises what he really believes in, for the sake of some ulterior motive or purpose.

Often intellectual opportunism is therefore understood as a sign of lack of integrity or intellectual shallowness, to the extent that the opportunist is not concerned with the worth of the ideas in themselves, but only with how he can benefit from them himself by pursuing them. As a corollary, the intellectual opportunist is often apt to change his opinions, and "change his line" rapidly or arbitrarily, according to where he can gain personal advantage, in a manner not consistent or principled.

The implication is usually that ideas are no longer being pursued because of their intrinsic merit or worth, or out of a genuine concern with what is at stake in an argument or idea, but only because of the instrumental value of ideas, i.e., the selfish advantage that can be gained from pursuing some ideas in preference to other ones. Observably ventilating or "advertising" suitably formulated ideas is then merely a means or a "tool" for self-advancement or the promotion of a group or organization, giving rise to accusations that the real intention of particular ideas is being twisted around to serve an alien or improper purpose. The general outcome may be that the ideas involved, though plausible at a superficial level, lack any deeper coherence, the coherence being ruled out by lack of regard for relevant principles. Intellectual "dilettantes" (people who do not truly know what they are talking about, i.e. dabblers) are often regarded as opportunists, insofar as they like to side with whatever viewpoint seems to be popular or credible at the time.

== Perception ==
Intellectual opportunism may appear obvious or crass, if the selfish motives for engaging in it are clear. It may also be very difficult to detect if:

- the intellectual opportunist is clever and intelligent, while his audience is not, or his audience lacks sufficient relevant information to "judge the intellectual act". A clever intellectual opportunist may be able to reconcile his changing stories and his ulterior selfish motives in such a way, that his intellectual concerns seem perfectly principled and consistent.
- it is very difficult to distinguish between legitimately seizing an intellectual opportunity with sincere motives, and using an intellectual opportunity for some selfish, ulterior motive.
- the intellectual opportunist is himself not aware of his own opportunism, i.e. what it means, or what its broader significance is, regarding his own pursuit of intellectual opportunities as perfectly legitimate. In this case, the true motives or the effects of a course of action may be unclear or in dispute.
- the relevant and appropriate moral norms are themselves in dispute, so that the validity of the assessment of "opportunism" in intellectual behaviour depends on "point of view".

To prove intellectual opportunism by an individual or a group may therefore require very comprehensive knowledge pertaining to the case. An additional complicating factor is the influence of cultural differences on human intentions. Behavior regarded as opportunist in one culture may not be so regarded in another because of differences in norms of moral propriety. For example, in American culture there is a much greater preoccupation with self-marketing, advertising and self-promotion, which in European countries might be regarded as crass opportunism, because the culturally appropriate ways to assert self-interest or self-concern are different. There may however be just as much opportunism in Europe as anywhere else, but with a different cultural style. People may say, "all's fair in love and war", but that also means that if one can represent something as a war or a matter of love, one can justify any action, since love and war permit actions that would ordinarily be regarded as unprincipled or illegitimate.
