= Rashida Manjoo =

South African professor of public law and social activist

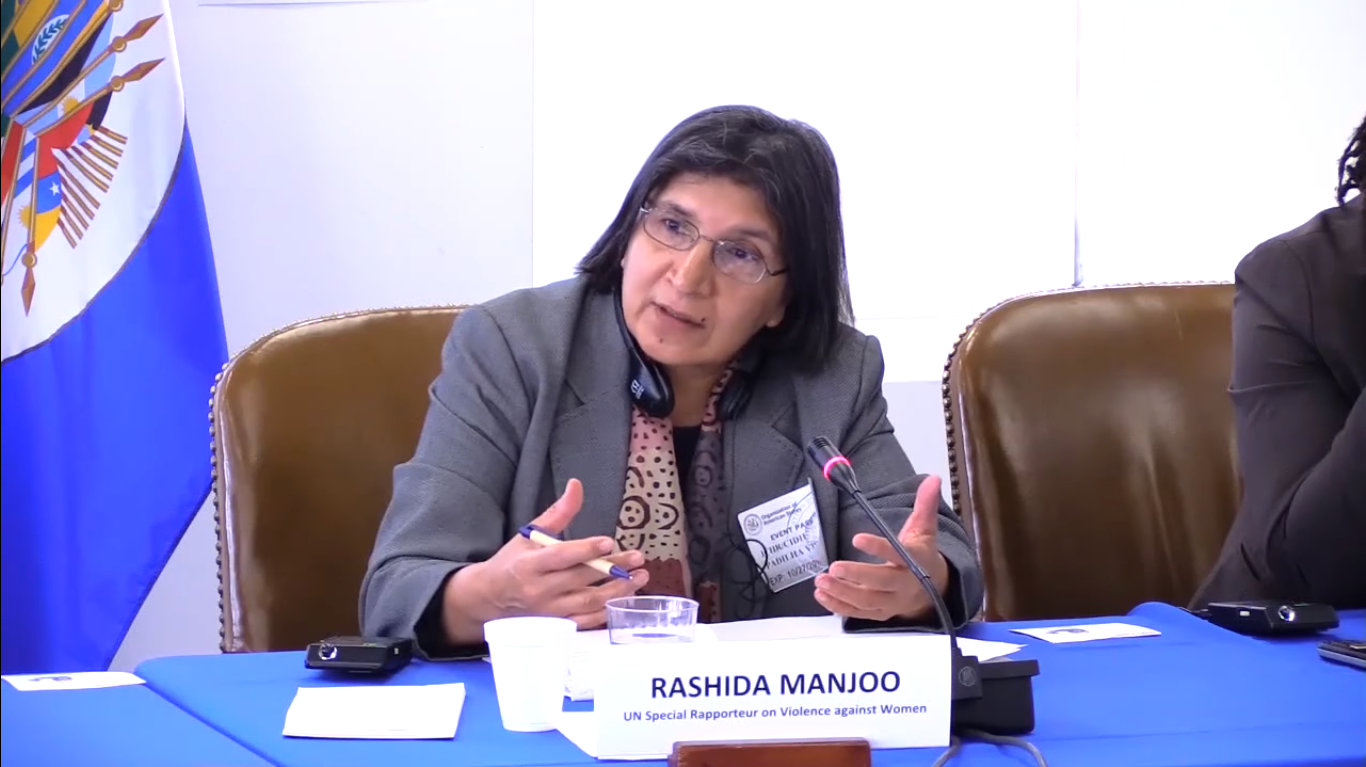
Rashida Manjoo in 2014

Rashida Manjoo is an Emeritus Professor at the University of Cape Town in Cape Town and a social activist involved in the eradication of violence against women and gender-based violence. Manjoo was the United Nations' Special Rapporteur on Violence Against Women from June 2009 to July 2015.

== Early life ==
Manjoo grew up in Durban, South Africa. She learned of injustices towards women from a young age, raised by her grandmother and mother in times of poverty in Apartheid South Africa. Living in apartheid South Africa allowed Manjoo to view the violence against women and lack of accountability from a young age. Manjoo’s parent's importance on education was expressed upon Manjoo and her five sister, This guided her into civil society positions, advocating for improved human rights standards. Manjoo grew of age in South Africa in a system that did not consider women equal, but inferior. She started working as a women’s liberation campaigner in anti-apartheid groups across South Africa.

== Career ==
Manjoo is a professor in the Department of Public Law at the University of Cape Town. She previously served as the Parliamentary Commissioner on South Africa's Commission on Gender Equality, and the Des Lee Distinguished Visiting Professor at Webster University. At Webster University, she has taught courses on human rights, with a particular focus on women's human rights and transitional justice. Manjoo also was a clinical instructor for the Human Rights Program at Harvard Law School in 2005 and 2006 and the Eleanor Roosevelt Fellow at Harvard Law School in 2006-07. Manjoo also taught at the University of Natal, Durban. Manjoo also established and taught social context training for judges and lawyers.

== Social work ==
Throughout the late 1980s and early 1990s, Manjoo and many other feminist activists added focus to the intersectional perspective, by including race and gender in the discussion of inequality and discrimination. Manjoo and other intersectional feminists began forming coalitions or networks for women in South Africa, such as the Women’s Charter which Manjoo created in her province in South Africa.

The different coalitions for women would reflect the desires and demands of the women in South Africa, especially in reaction to the treatment of women during the apartheid. During the time of apartheid and the following transition period towards democracy, there was rampant state-sponsored violence against women and other minority groups such as student protesters. The Women’s Charter and other groups focused their efforts on increasing awareness of the violence towards women and generating support for those women.

Manjoo’s work for human rights for women led to her involvement in regional and international discussions on justice for women, including work on the Protocol on Women in Africa (Maputo Protocol), the African Court on Human Rights, and the Rome Treaty (International Criminal Court). Manjoo worked internationally with these groups to recognize how violence against women is manifested and translated those manifestations into categories of crime under international criminal law.

Through the Women’s Caucus for Gender Justice and the Coalition on Sexual Violence in Conflict, Manjoo worked to link women’s local knowledge and presence in global initiatives to support women, and to illuminate the existence of gendered violence and strengthen international criminal law to prevent and prosecute. Manjoo worked to expose the negative effects of violence against women, and the interplay between different individual, family, community, and social factors on violence and the perpetuation of violence against women.

Manjoo worked as a human rights lawyer throughout her career, including for the Committee on the Elimination of Discrimination against Women (CEDAW) to create shadow reports— which are disclosed reports that can be submitted by Non-governmental Organizations (NGOs) to articulate and advocate for certain needs of citizens which are currently being unsupported or mismanaged by national governments. Manjoo spent time with CEDAW and other activists, drafting a submission on violence against women in both local and global communities, in theory, and practice. Manjoo subsequently served for five years as Parliamentary Commissioner in the Commission on Gender Equality to hold governments accountable to national constitutions; again, using various independent organizations (including NGOs) to regulate the accountability of national governments. This position gave Manjoo the ability to work within a state structure while emphasizing the national need for support of women in the discussion of human rights. Manjoo also used her position on the Commission on Gender Equality to reject the theory of solely analyzing civil and political rights independently, but rather urging for a holistic approach to human rights including intersectional experiences.

During Manjoo’s career advocating for activism against oppression and discrimination, Manjoo dedicated efforts to educate students across the globe.

=== United Nations Special Rapporteur for Violence Against Women (UNSPVAW) ===
Manjoo’s dedication to action on issues of social justice within her many capacities, compounded with her strife for personal and community education and equal opportunities, made widely known within the international women’s movement. Manjoo was nominated and appointed to UN Special Rapporteur on Violence against Women, its causes and consequences, in 2009, by the UN Secretary-General, Kofi Annan with the support of the UN Human Rights Council (UNHRC) Manjoo’s local and national work for gender and race equality logically culminated in her appointment to the UNHRC. As the United Nations Special Rapporteur for Violence Against Women (UNSPVAW), Manjoo continually worked to display the gap between government promises and the action taken to support women afflicted by violence. Manjoo has done so by prioritizing many issues of violence against women as thematic mandates submitted to the UNHRC.

Manjoo provided thematic reports to the UN Human Rights Council and the UN General Assembly. These thematic mandates report on the research collected by the UN Special Rapporteur and their recommended procedures. Manjoo has continually provided thematic mandates on a variety of issues regarding violence against women.

These thematic mandates include:

- violence against women and girls with disabilities
- gender-motivated killings of women and their role in the continuum of violence
- pathways to incarceration and their resulting consequences
- reparations for women who have been victims of violence
- the multiple and intersecting forms of discrimination in violence
- the state’s responsibility to due diligence and the elimination of violence against women.

The thematic mandates exposed the gap in international criminal law between human rights standards and the treatment and violence against women. She has attempted to influence more accountability on the part of national governments globally, stating states are not being held responsible for their role in violence against women; calling for responsibility “necessary” to for countries to be intolerant to violence against women properly. This call for accountability is clear in Manjoo’s final two thematic reports which claimed, under international law, there are no provisions that impose legally binding obligations on member states to eliminate violence against women. Manjoo is also notable for exposing governments or organizations that are or complacent in the harm of women, which occasionally has led to criticism.

Most notably, Manjoo gained national media coverage when, after a 16-day investigation of the UK, Manjoo expressed that the UK had a more visible presence of sexism and sexist portrayals of women, claiming that the British media was to blame for its responsibility in the “negative and over-sexualized portrayals of women” and the “marketization of their bodies.” Many people were upset by this characterization of the UK and criticized Manjoo for her opinions, deeming them an unfair interpretation and representation of the UK In 2014, Manjoo submitted a report on violence and sex crimes in India believing the violence to be widespread and systematic. Referencing her many discussions with women and experts in India as evidence of deep-rooted physical, sexual, and psychological abuse of women occurring in the private sphere and accepted by the State. Officials from India denied that violence against women is systematic, and criticized Manjoo’s statements for being simplistic and an over generalization. Manjoo called for a global treaty to end violence against women in 2014, citing the "absence of a legally binding agreement at the international level represents one of the obstacles to the promotion and protection of women’s rights and gender equality."

She was succeeded by Dr. Dubravka Šimonović in July 2015.

== Awards and honors ==
- William McKinley Award for Good Governance - Albany Law School (2013)
- International Human Rights Award - American Bar Association (2014)
- Honorary degree of Doctor - University of Glasgow (2015)

== Written work ==
- Report of the Special Rapporteur on Violence against Women, its Causes and Consequences (2017)
- "The challenges of formalisation, regulation, and reform of traditional courts in South Africa". Malawi Law Journal. 3 (2): 157–181. 1 January 2009. hdl:10520/EJC76226.
- Manjoo, Rashida; Nadj, Daniela (1 November 2015). "'Bridging the Divide': An Interview with Professor Rashida Manjoo, UN Special Rapporteur on Violence Against Women". Feminist Legal Studies. 23 (3): 329–347. doi:10.1007/s10691-015-9303-7. S2CID 146125851.
- Manjoo, Rashida (2012). "The Continuum of Violence against Women and the Challenges of Effective Redress". International Human Rights Law Review. 1 (1): 1–29. doi:10.1163/22131035-00101008.
- Report of the Special Rapporteur on violence against women, its causes and consequences, Addendum : Mission to India: comments by the State on the report of the Special Rapporteur (2014)
- Trafficking of Women: Norms, Realities, and Challenges (2014)
- The South African Truth and Reconciliation Commission- A Model for Gender Justice (2012)
- Padayachee, Anshu; Manjoo, Rashida (1 January 1996). "Domestic violence support services will fail without agency networking". Agenda. 12 (30): 73–78. doi:10.1080/10130950.1996.9675548.
- Gender-based Violence and Justice in Conflict and Post-Conflict Areas (2011)
- Czapanskiy, Karen; Manjoo, Rashida (1 October 2008). "The Right of Public Participation in the Law-Making Process and the Role of the Legislature in the Promotion of this Right". Duke Journal of Comparative & International Law. 19 (1): 1–40.
- "Gender Injustice and the South African Truth and Reconciliation Commission". Gendered Peace. 2012. pp. 147–164. doi:10.4324/9780203939130-9. ISBN 9780203939130.
- The Recognition of Muslim Personal Laws in South Africa: Implications of Women’s Human Rights (2007)
- What’s in a Name? The Identity and Reform of Customary Law in South Africa’s Constitutional Dispensation (2006)
- Manjoo, Rashida (1 January 2005). "South Africa's National Gender Machinery". Acta Juridica. 2005 (1): 243–272. hdl:10520/EJC52657.
- Gender Rights Within the Framework of Traditional or Group Cultural Norms and Rights (2005)
- Manjoo, Rashida (2004). "Legislative Recognition of Muslim Marriages in South Africa". International Journal of Legal Information. 32 (2): 271–282. doi:10.1017/S0731126500004133. S2CID 152769203.

== See also ==
- Women's rights in 2014
