= United Nations Special Rapporteur on Violence Against Women =

United Nations Special Rapporteur

- Incumbent; Reem Alsalem since August 2021
- Inaugural holder: Radhika Coomaraswamy
- Website: www.ohchr.org/en/issues/women/srwomen/pages/srwomenindex.aspx

On 4 March 1994 the Human Rights Council passed Resolution 1994/45 on the question of integrating the rights of women into the human rights mechanisms of the United Nations and the elimination of violence against women. This Resolution established the mandate of the "Special Rapporteur on Violence Against Women its causes and consequences". The initial appointment was for a three-year period. As of November 2021 the special rapporteur is Reem Alsalem, who is controversial for her gender critical views and who according to legal scholar Jens Theilen is "using women’s rights as a tool to undermine trans rights."

== Mandate ==
The special rapporteur is mandated to seek and receive information on violence against women, recommend ways to eliminate violence against women at national, regional and intersectionality levels, and work collaboratively with the other United Nations human rights mechanisms.

== Country visits ==
The special rapporteur is mandated to carry out country visits, often in conjunction with other special rapporteurs, independent experts or working groups.

== Reports to the Human Rights Council ==
Each year the Special Rapporteur provides a written report to the Human Rights Council outlining the activities undertaken and themes analyzed.

== Communications ==
The Special Rapporteur can send communications or letters to governments and other actors regarding human rights violations and concerns relating to bills, legislation, policies or practices that do not comply with international human rights law and standards. In such communications, the Special Rapporteur has, amongst others, violence by corporations and intersectionality.

== Post-holders ==
- Radhika Coomaraswamy (1994–2003)
- Yakin Ertürk (2003–2009)
- Rashida Manjoo (2009–2015)
- Dubravka Šimonović (2015–2021)
- Reem Alsalem (2021–present)
