= Toumaï Air Tchad =

Flag carrier of Chad

Toumaï Air Tchad الخطوط الجوية التشادية توماي
IATA	ICAO	Call sign
9D	THE	TOUMAI AIR
- Founded: 2004
- Ceased operations: 2014
- Hubs: N'Djamena International Airport
- Fleet size: 1
- Destinations: 16
- Headquarters: N'Djamena, Chad
- Key people: Mahamat Baba Abatcha (General Manager)

Toumaï Air Chad (Arabic: الخطوط الجوية التشادية توماي) was the national flag carrier airline of Chad. It operated domestic services within Chad as well as scheduled international services to other African nations from its main base at N'Djamena International Airport. International flights appeared to have been operated by primarily South African crews, but there is no recent confirmation of this, and flights were grounded in July 2012 because of safety concerns. Scheduled flights appear to be suspended, but recent reports (September 2013) indicate that Toumaï Air Tchad had resumed limited operations on Hajj charter flights.

== History ==
Founded in 2004 as Toumaï Air Service and soon after rebranded Toumaï Air Tchad was a member of the International Air Transport Association.

Effective January 20, 2009, the U.S. Embassy in N'Djamena prohibited its employees from using Toumaï Air for official travel due to safety and maintenance concerns.

Effective July 6, 2012, Chadian authorities suspended international flights operated by Toumaï Air after an investigation by the international aviation body IATA revealed serious safety problems. Toumaï Air had just one aircraft left, a Fokker 28, after losing its leased Boeing 737-200 to creditors.

In September 2013 it was reported that the airline had resumed limited operations with an ex-Georgian Star International Boeing 737-300 being deployed on Hajj charter flights from N'Djamena to Madinah, Saudi Arabia, and was also using a leased B747-200 for the duration of the pilgrimage.

== Destinations ==
The current destinations Toumaï Air Tchad serves are:

- Saudi Arabia
  - Jeddah (King Abdulaziz International Airport) (Seasonal as hajj service)

=== Suspended destinations ===
Destinations as of July 2008, before suspension of flights:

=== Africa ===
- Benin
  - Cotonou (Cadjehoun Airport)
- Cameroon
  - Douala (Douala International Airport)
  - Yaoundé (Yaoundé Nsimalen International Airport)
- Central African Republic
  - Bangui (Bangui M'Poko International Airport)
- Chad
  - Abéché (Abéché Airport)
  - Am Timan (Am-Timan Airport)
  - Faya-Largeau (Faya-Largeau Airport)
  - Moundou (Moundou Airport)
  - N'Djamena (N'Djamena International Airport) Hub
  - Sarh (Sarh Airport)
- Côte d'Ivoire
  - Abidjan (Port Bouet Airport)
- Gabon
  - Libreville (Libreville International Airport)
- Republic of the Congo
  - Brazzaville (Maya-Maya Airport)
- Togo
  - Lomé (Lomé-Tokoin Airport)

=== Asia ===
- Saudi Arabia
  - Jeddah (King Abdulaziz International Airport) (Seasonal)
- United Arab Emirates
  - Dubai (Dubai International Airport)

== Fleet ==
As of August 2025, Toumaï Air Tchad operates the following aircraft:

Aircraft	In service	Notes
Boeing 737-300	1	
