= Tchadia Airlines =

Airline of Chad

IATA	ICAO	Call sign
OT	CDO	TCHADIA
- Founded: 2018
- Commenced operations: 1 October 2018
- Ceased operations: August 2022
- Hubs: N'Djamena International Airport
- Fleet size: 2
- Destinations: 10
- Parent company: Government of Chad (51%); Ethiopian Airlines (49%)
- Headquarters: N'Djamena, Chad
- Key people: Fikre Degife, CEO
- Website: tchadianairlines.com

Tchadia Airlines was an airline based at N'Djamena International Airport in N’Djamena, Chad. The airline was the national carrier of Chad.

== History ==
In August 2018, it was announced that the Government of Chad had signed an agreement with Ethiopian Airlines to launch Chad's new national carrier on 1 October 2018. It was also announced the airline would be named Tchadia Airlines and would start operations using a fleet of 2 Bombardier Dash 8 Q400 transferred from Ethiopia, and would initially serve the four main cities in Chad and neighbouring countries.

After three consecutive years of financial losses, the airline was placed into liquidation.

== Destinations ==
As of September 2018, Tchadia Airlines operated to the following destinations:

City	Country	Airport	Notes	Refs
Douala	Cameroon	Douala International Airport		
Bangui	Central African Republic	Bangui M'Poko International Airport		
Abéché	Chad	Abéché Airport		
Faya-Largeau	Chad	Faya-Largeau Airport		
Moundou	Chad	Moundou Airport		
N’Djamena	Chad	N'Djamena International Airport	Hub	
Sarh	Chad	Sarh Airport		
Niamey	Niger	Diori Hamani International Airport		
Kano	Nigeria	Mallam Aminu Kano International Airport		
Khartoum	Sudan	Khartoum International Airport		

== Fleet ==
As of August 2019, Tchadia Airlines operated the following aircraft:

Tchadia Airlines fleet
Aircraft	In Service	Orders	Passengers			Notes
Aircraft	In Service	Orders	C	Y	Total	Notes
Bombardier Dash 8 Q400	2	—	7	60	67	
Total	2	—				
