= Transport in Chad =

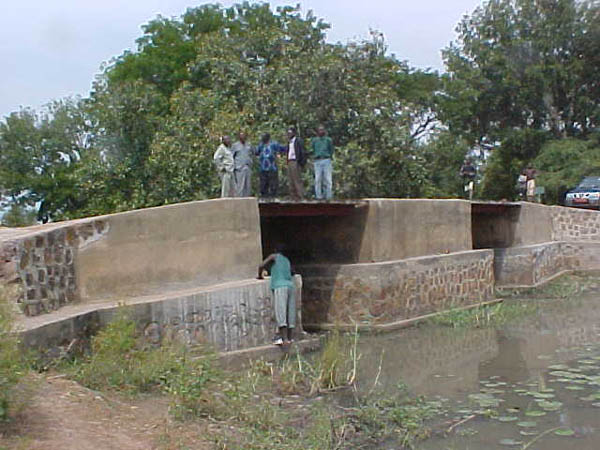
Rebuilt Bridge in south west of Chad over the Bragoto River

Transport infrastructure within Chad is generally poor, especially in the north and east of the country. River transport is limited to the south-west corner. As of 2012, Chad had no railways though two lines are planned - from the capital to the Sudanese and Cameroonian borders during the wet season, especially in the southern half of the country. In the north, roads are merely tracks across the desert and land mines continue to present a danger. Draft animals (horses, donkeys and camels) remain important in much of the country. Fuel supplies can be erratic, even in the south-west of the country, and are expensive. Elsewhere they are practically non-existent.

== Road transport ==
Three trans-African automobile routes pass through Chad:

- the Tripoli-Cape Town Highway (3)
- the Dakar-Ndjamena Highway (5)
- the Ndjamena-Djibouti Highway (6)

As at 2018 Chad had a total of 44,000 km of roads of which approximately 260 km are paved. Some but not all of the roads in the capital N'Djamena are paved. Outside of N'Djamena there is one paved road which runs from Massakory in the north, through N'Djamena and then south, through the cities of Guélengdeng, Bongor, Kélo and Moundou, with a short spur leading in the direction of Kousseri, Cameroon, near N'Djamena. Expansion of the road towards Cameroon through Pala and Léré is reportedly in the preparatory stages.

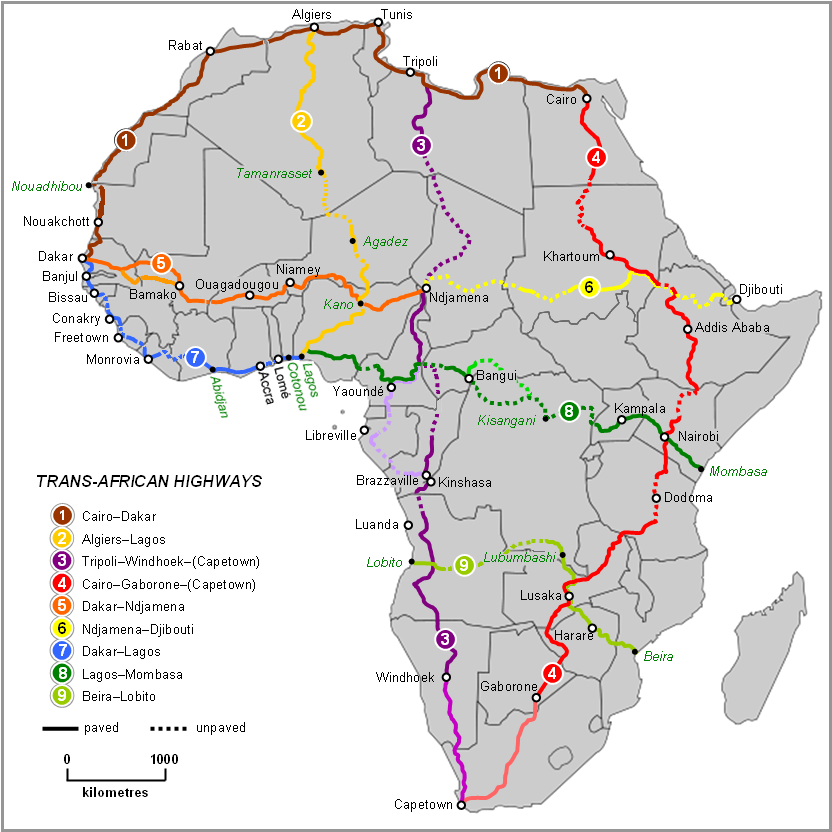
Map of the Trans-African Highways.

Road transport during wet season.

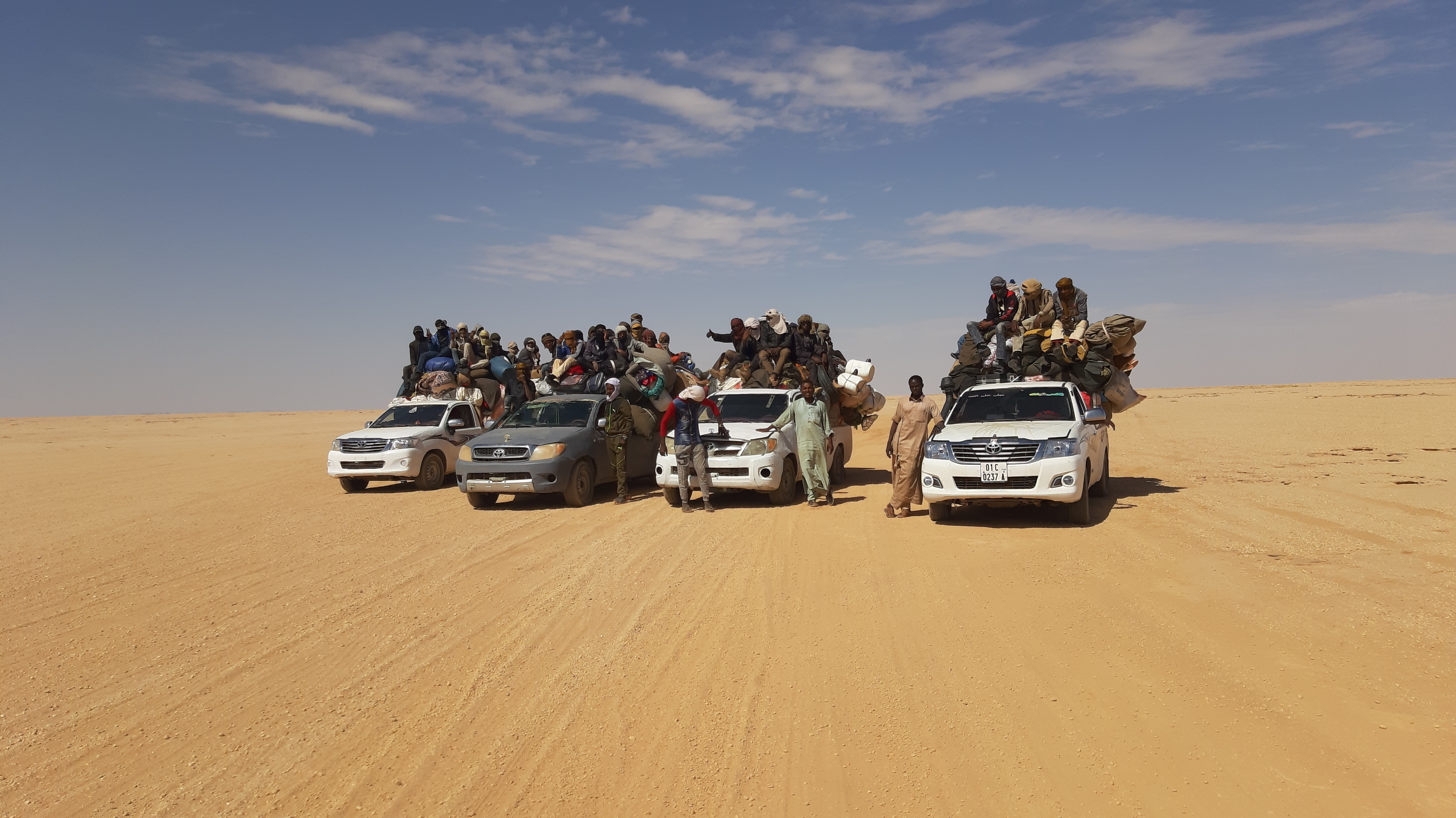
Through the desert near the Chad-Libya border.

== Airports ==
As of 2012 Chad had an estimated 58 airports, only 9 of which had paved runways. In 2015, scheduled airlines in Chad carried approximately 28,333 passengers.

=== Airports with paved runways ===
Statistics on airports with paved runways as of 2017:

Runway length	Airports
over 3,047 metres (10,000 ft)	2
2,438 to 3,047 metres (8,000 to 10,000 ft)	4
1,524 to 2,437 metres (5,000 to 8,000 ft)	2
914 to 1,524 metres (3,000 to 5,000 ft)	0
under 914 metres (3,000 ft)	1
TOTAL	9

List of airports with paved runways:

- Abeche Airport
- Bol Airport
- Faya-Largeau Airport
- Moundou Airport
- N'Djamena International Airport
- Sarh Airport

=== Airports - with unpaved runways ===
Statistics on airports with unpaved runways as of 2013:

Runway length	Airports
over 3,047 metres (10,000 ft)	1
2,438 to 3,047 metres (8,000 to 10,000 ft)	2
1,524 to 2,437 metres (5,000 to 8,000 ft)	14
914 to 1,524 metres (3,000 to 5,000 ft)	22
under 914 metres (3,000 ft)	11
TOTAL	50

== Railways ==
As of 2011 Chad had no railways. Two lines were planned to Sudan and Cameroon from the capital, with construction expected to start in 2012. No operative lines were listed as of 2019.

In 2021, an ADB study was funded for that rail link from Cameroon to Chad.

== Seaports and harbors ==
None (landlocked).

Chad's main routes to the sea are:

- From N'Djamena and the south west of Chad:
  - By road to Ngaoundéré, in Cameroon, and then by rail to Douala
  - By road to Maiduguri, in Nigeria, and then by rail to Port Harcourt
- From the north and east of Chad:
  - By road across the Sahara desert to Libya

In colonial times, the main access was by road to Bangui, in the Central African Republic, then by river boat to Brazzaville, and onwards by rail from Brazzaville to Pointe Noire, on Congo's Atlantic coast. This route is now little used.

There is also a route across Sudan, to the Red Sea, but very little trade goes this way.

Links with Niger, north of Lake Chad, are practically nonexistent; it is easier to reach Niger via Cameroon and Nigeria.

== Waterways ==
As at 2012, Chari and Logone Rivers were navigable only in wet season (2002). Both flow northwards, from the south of Chad, into Lake Chad.

== Pipelines ==
Since 2003, a 1,070 km pipeline has been used to export crude oil from the oil fields around Doba to offshore oil-loading facilities on Cameroon's Atlantic coast at Kribi. The CIA World Factbook however cites only 582 km of pipeline in Chad itself as at 2013.

== Ministry of Transport ==
The Ministry is represented at the regional level by the Regional Delegations, which have jurisdiction over a part of the National Territory as defined by Decree No. 003 / PCE / CTPT / 91. Their organization and responsibilities are defined by Order No. 006 / MTPT / SE / DG / 92.

The Regional Delegations are:

- The Regional Delegation of the Center covering the regions of Batha, Guéra and Salamat with headquarters in Mongo;
- The Regional Delegation of the Center-Ouest covering the regions of Chari Baguirmi and Hatier Lamis with headquarters Massakory;
- The North-West Regional Delegation covering the Kanem and Lake regions with headquarters in Mao;
- The Western Regional Delegation covering the areas of Mayo-East Kebbi, Mayo-West Kebbi and Tandjile with headquarters in Bongor;
- The Eastern Regional Delegation covering the regions of Wadi Fira and Ouaddai with headquarters in Abéché;
- The South-East Regional Delegation covering the Mandoul and Moyen Chari regions with headquarters in Sarh;
- The Southwest Regional Delegation covering the regions of Logone Occidental and Logone Orientai with headquarters in Moundou;
- The Northern Regional Delegation covering the BET region with headquarters in Faya.

Each Regional Delegation is organized into regional services, namely: the Regional Roads Service, the Regional Transport Service, the Civilian Buildings Regional Service and, as needed, other regional services may be established in one or more Delegations .

== See also ==
- Chad
- Economy of Chad
