= List of defunct airlines of Chad =

== Defunct airlines ==
This is a list of now defunct airlines from Chad.

Airline	Image	IATA	ICAO	Callsign	Commenced operations	Ceased operations	Notes
Afrijet Tchad					2014	2016	Renamed to flyART Aviation
Air Horizon Afrique			TPK	TCHAD-HORIZON	1999	2010	
Air Tchad		HT	HTT	HOTEL TANGO	1966	2002	
AMW Tchad			TWK		2007	2007	Renamed to Mid Express Tchad. Operated Lockheed Tristar
AirInter1			HRV	SAHARA-SERVICE	2014	2017	Operated Boeing 737-300
CHC Tchad					2009	2012	Renamed to Avmax Chad. Operated DHC Dash 8
Escadrille Tchadienne					1968	1968	Operated Alouette II
Intair Tchad					1991	1992	
LAT Lignes Aeriennes du Tchad			LKD	LATCHAD	2003	2003	Operated Ilyushin Il-18
Mid Express Tchad					2008	2008	Established as AMW Tchad. Operated Boeing 707
Minair					2000	2004	
Sahara Aero Service			HRV	SAHARA-SERVICE	2009	2014	Renamed to AirInter1. Operated Boeing 737-300
Tchadia Airlines		OT	CDO	TCHADIA	2018	2022	
Toumaï Air Service		9D	THE	TOUMAI AIR	2004	2004	Renamed to Toumaï Air Tchad. Operated Boeing 737-300
Toumaï Air Tchad		9D	THE	TOUMAI AIR	2004	2014	

== See also ==
- Transport in Chad
- List of airports in Chad
