= List of Douglas DC-4 operators =

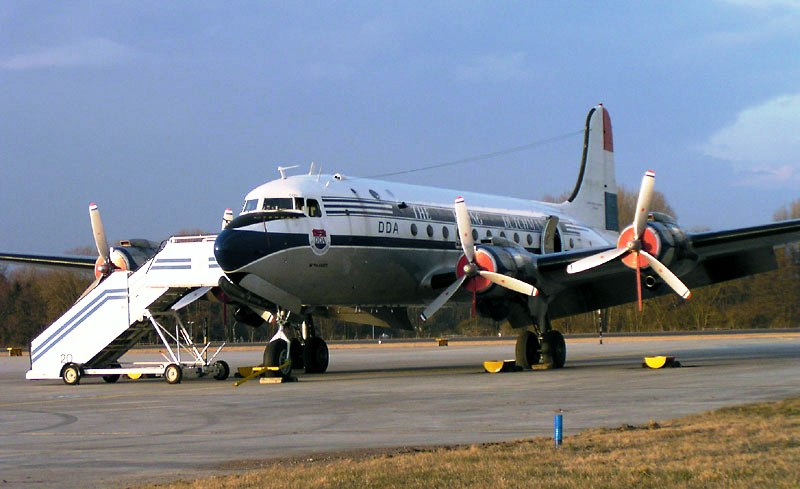
DC-4 operated by the Dutch Dakota Association in the "Flying Dutchman" colours of KLM

This is a list of operators of the Douglas DC-4, Douglas C-54, Canadair North Star and Douglas R5D.

== Civil operators ==
Aden

- Aden Airways^{Note 1}

Algeria

- Air Algerie

Antigua and Barbuda

- Seagreen Air Transport

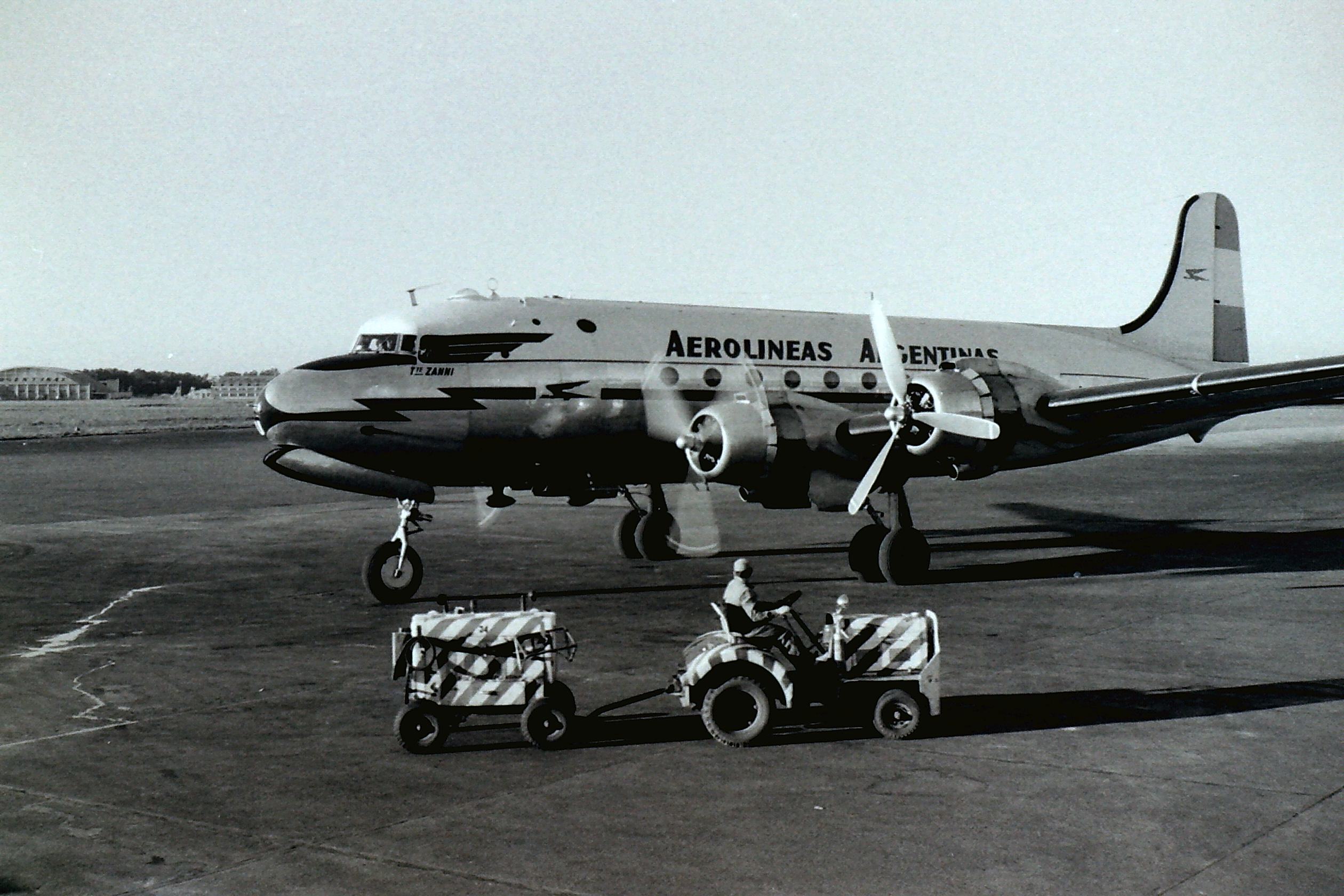
Aerolineas Argentinas DC-4 at Ministro Pistarini Airport, Argentina, 1958.

Argentina

- Aerolíneas Argentinas
- Aerotransportes Entre Rios
- Aerovias Halcon
- Flota Aérea Mercante Argentina (FAMA)

Australia

- Air Express
- Ansett-ANA^{Note 2}
- Australian National Airways
- British Commonwealth Pacific Airlines
- Pacific Air Freighters
- Qantas
- Trans Australia Airlines

Barbados

- Carib West Airways

Belgium

- SABENA
- Avions Fairey
- Belgian International Air Services

Bolivia

- Frigorifico Reyes

Burundi

- King of Burundi^{Note 1}

Cameroon

- Air Cameroun (Société anonyme des avions Meyer et compagnie)
- Cameroon Airlines

Canada

- Air North
- Buffalo Airways
- Eldorado Aviation
- Canadian Pacific Airlines^{Note 1}
- Trans-Canada Airlines^{Note 1}
- World Wide Airways^{Note 1}
- Curtiss Reid Flying Services Canada
- Kenting Aviation
- Maritime Central Airways
- Millardair
- Nordair
- Pacific Western
- Soundair
- Transair

Chad

- Air Tchad

Republic of China

- China Airlines
- Civil Air Transport

Colombia

- Avianca
- SATENA

Democratic Republic of the Congo

- Air Congo

Denmark

- Det Danske Luftfartselskab (DDL)
- Flying Enterprise - Canadair North Star

Ecuador

- Aerovias Ecuatorianas

El Salvador

- TACA International Airlines

France

- Air France
- Compagnie Air Transport

Gabon

- Transgabon

Germany

- Aerotour
- All-Air
- Continentale Deutsche Luftreederei
- LTU International
- Luftreederei Karl Herfurtner
- Transavia Flug
- Transportflug

Greece

- Olympic Airways

Guatemala

- Aviateca

Hong Kong

- Cathay Pacific Airways

India

- Indian Airlines

Iceland

- Icelandair
- Loftleidir

Ireland

- Aer Turas
- Shannon Air

Israel

- El Al

Italy

- Alitalia

Côte d'Ivoire

- Air Afrique

Japan

- Japan Air Lines

Kenya, Uganda, Tanganyika and Zanzibar

- East African Airways^{Note 1}

Lebanon

- Middle East Airlines
- Trans Mediterranean Airways

Luxembourg

- Luxair

Madagascar

- Air Madagascar

Mauritania

- Air Mauritanie

Mexico

- Aerovias Guest
- Líneas Aéreas Unidas Mexicanas^{Note 1}

The Netherlands

- KLM
- Martin's Air Charter

Nicaragua

- LANICA (Lineas Aereas de Nicaragua S.A.)

Niger

- Air Niger

Norway

- Braathens SAFE
- Det Norske Luftfartsselskap (DNL)

Panama

- Aerovias Internacional Balboa
- Copa Airlines^{Note 1}

Paraguay

- Paraguayan Airways Service
- Lloyd Aéreo Paraguayo S.A.

Peru

- Faucett Perú

Philippines

- Philippine Air Lines

South Africa

- SkyClass Aviation
- Africair
- Safair
- South African Airways
- Trek Airways

South Korea

- Korean Air Lines

South Vietnam

- Air Vietnam

Spain

- Aviaco
- Iberia
- Spantax
- Trans Europa

Sweden

- Scandinavian Airlines
- Svensk Interkontinental Lufttrafik

Switzerland

- Balair

Syria

- Syrian Airways

Thailand

- Air Siam
- Pacific Overseas Airlines (Siam)
- Thai Airways

United Kingdom

- ACE Freighters
- Air Charter Limited
- Channel Airways
- Dan-Air
- Eagle Airways
- Invicta Airways
- Lloyd International
- Skyways
- Starways
- Air Links^{Note 1}
- BOAC^{Note 1}
- British Midland^{Note 1}
- Derby Airways^{Note 1}
- Keegan Aviation^{Note 1}
- Overseas Aviation^{Note 1}
- Transglobe Airways^{Note 1}

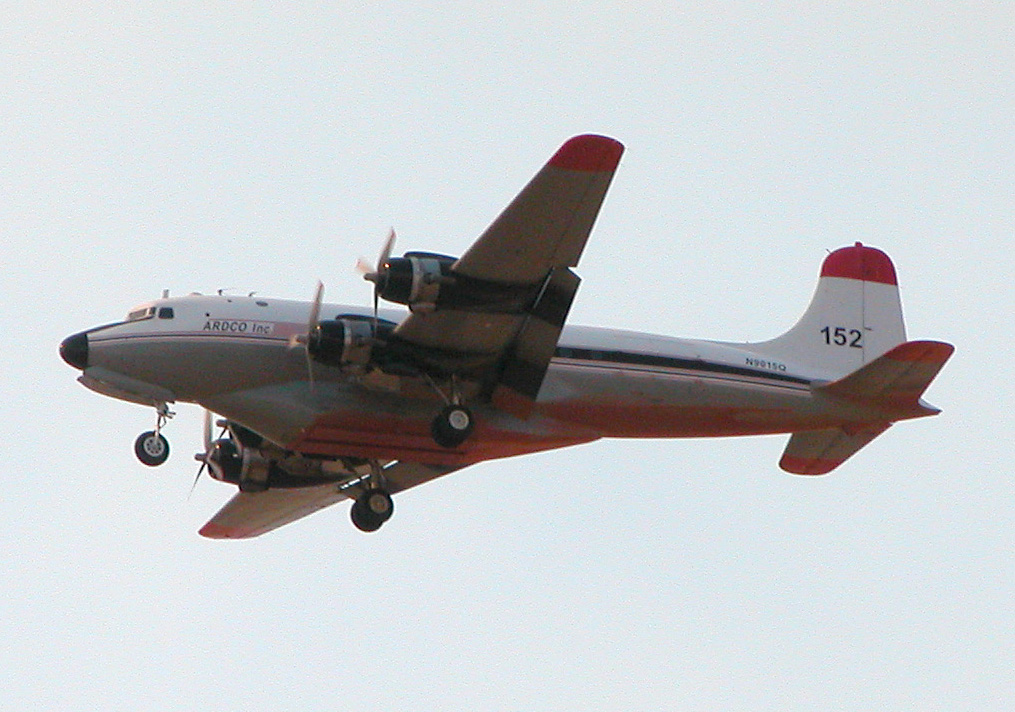
Ardco C-54D (DC-4) 43-17228 air tanker landing at Fox Field, Lancaster, California, 2003. Now with Berlin Airlift Historical Foundation as "Spirit of Freedom"

United States

- Aerovias Sud Americana (aka ASA International Airlines)
- Aero Union
- Air America
- Alaska Airlines
- American Airlines
- American Export Airlines/American Overseas Airlines
- ARAMCO
- Biegert Aviation
- Berlin Airlift Historical Foundation (http://www.spiritoffreedom.org)
- Capital Airlines
- Chicago and Southern Airlines
- Delta Air Lines
- Eastern Airlines
- Flying Tiger Line
- Mackey Airlines
- Matson Lines
- National Airlines
- Near East Air Transport
- Northwest Airlines
- Overseas National Airways
- Pan American World Airways
- Pacific Overseas Airlines
- Pacific Southwest Airlines
- Riddle Airlines
- Santa Fe Skyways (owned by Santa Fe Railroad)
- Trans Caribbean Airways
- Transocean Air Lines
- Trans World Airlines
- Trust Territory Air Service
- United Air Lines
- United States Overseas Airlines
- Westair Transport
- Waterman Airlines
- Western Airlines
- Zantop Air Transport

Venezuela

- Linea Expressa Bolivar^{Note 1}

=== Notes ===
- ^1 Canadair North Star operator
- ^2 Ansett-ANA was also an original operator of the Aviation Traders ATL-98 Carvair conversion of the DC-4/C-54

== Military operators ==
(Douglas C-54 unless specified)

Argentina

- Argentine Air Force
- Argentine Naval Aviation

Belgium

- Belgian Air Force - One former R5D1 from 1950 to 1971, also operated one DC-4.

Bolivia

- TAM – Transporte Aéreo Militar - one former USAF VC-54D and one C-54G both bought in 1973.

Brazil

- Força Aérea Brasileira - Twelve C-54Gs serialled FAB 2400 to FAB 2411, flown by the "1º/2º Grupo de Transporte" between 1960 and 1968

Cambodia

- Royal Khmer Aviation (AVRK) - One C-54B used as a VIP transport, flown by the "Transport and Liaison Group" (French: Groupe d'Liaison et Transport – GLT) between 1960 and 1970.

Canada

- Royal Canadian Air Force - Canadair North Star

Chad

- Chadian Air Force - received from France in 1976

Colombia

- Colombian Air Force

Cuba

- Fuerza Aérea del Ejército de Cuba - Photographic evidence of one registered 614. There are reports of a second one registered 615. Unknown origin.

Denmark

- Royal Danish Air Force - Six C-54D/Gs, 1959–1977

Dominican Republic

- Fuerza Aérea Dominicana - Photographic evidence of two aircraft registered 3105 –named 'San Isidro'– and 3106. Unknown origin.

El Salvador

- Salvadoran Air Force - Canadair North Star

Ethiopia

- Ethiopian Air Force - One former USAF C-54D from 1966 and one former US DoT C-54G in 1969.

France

- French Air Force - One C-54E donated in 1945 and transferred to the Navy in 1960. One C-54A 1961–1975.
- French Naval Aviation - One C-54E transferred from the Air Force in 1960, destroyed in 1982. One C-54B 1962–1969.

Guatemala

- Fuerza Aérea Guatemalteca - One received late 1964 and registered 800. Sold to Honduras as FAH-799 in 1973.

Honduras

- Honduras Air Force

Iceland

- Icelandic Coast Guard

Israel

- Israeli Air Force

Mexico

- Mexican Air Force - 7 C-54B

Netherlands East Indies

- Royal Netherlands East Indies Army Air Force - four C-54As operated in 1946.

Niger

- Niger Air Force - One C-54B 1968–1974.

Peru

- Peruvian Air Force - Nine delivered in late 1966.

Portugal

- Portuguese Air Force - Four C-54Ds operated from 1952 supplemented in 1961 by four former C-54As that had been modified to DC-4 standard. In 1965 ten former USAF HC-54Ds were obtained with an additional four as spares.

Rhodesia

- Royal Rhodesian Air Force - Canadair North Star

Republic of China

- Chinese Nationalist Air Force - former USAF aircraft 2 × C-54D (one bought in 1965 and one in 1966), and 1 × C-54G (bought in 1968)

Saudi Arabia

- Royal Saudi Air Force - one former Saudia C-54A from 1960 and now preserved.

South Korea

- Republic of Korea Air Force

South Africa

- South African Air Force

Spain

- Spanish Air Force - Four former C-54Ds given to Spain by the USAF in 1959 were later supplemented by another 13 second-hand aircraft which included C-54, C-54A, C-54B, C-54E, C-54G and 5D-3s.

Thailand

- Royal Thai Air Force

Turkey

- Turkish Air Force - three C-54Ds from 1966 to 1976.

United Kingdom

- Royal Air Force - 10 C-54Ds transferred from USAF under lend-lease in 1945 and returned in 1946. One special fitted C-54B for the use by Winston Churchill transferred in 1944 and returned in 1945.
  - No. 232 Squadron RAF
  - No. 246 Squadron RAF
  - Metropolitan Communications Squadron

United States

- United States Army Air Forces
- US Air Force - Douglas C-54
- United States Navy - Douglas R5D
- US Marine Corps - R5D
- US Coast Guard - R5D

Venezuela

- Venezuelan Air Force - One C-54A 1949–1955.

Zimbabwe

== See also ==
- Aviation Traders Carvair
