= Lake Wey =

Lake in southern Chad

- Lac Wey (French)
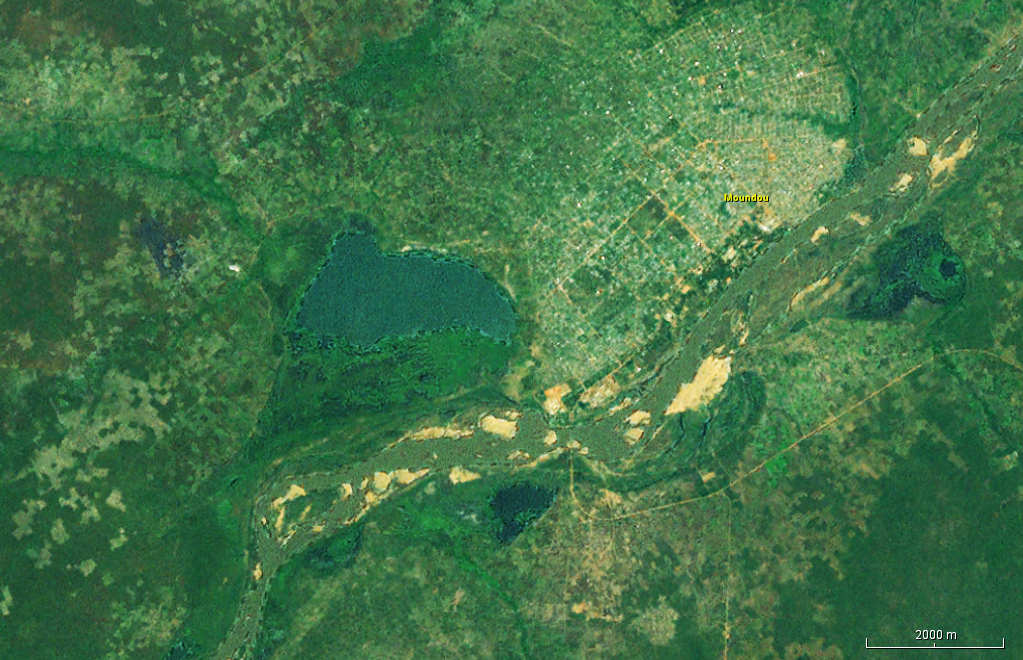

- Location: Moundou, Logone Occidental, Chad
- Coordinates: 8°33′15″N 16°02′15″E

Lake Wey, also spelt Lake Ouei, Lake Oueye or Lake We, is a lake in southern Chad. It lies adjacent to Moundou, the second-largest city in Chad, to its southwest and lies just north of the Mbéré River (a tributary of the Western Logone).

The lake is located in the Lac Wey department of the Logone Occidental region of Chad.
