= AEH =

AEH may refer to:

- Abéché Airport in Ouaddaï Region, Chad (IATA airport code AEH)
- Aegon N.V. 6.375% Perpetual Capital Securities (New York Stock Exchange code AEH)
- Augustus Edward Hough Love, or A.E.H. Love, a mathematician from the UK
- University of Economics and Human Sciences in Warsaw (Akademia Ekonomiczno-Humanistyczna w Warszawie), now VIZJA University, a private university based in Warsaw, Poland
