= List of airlines of Chad =

This is a list of airlines currently operating in Chad:

| Airline | IATA | ICAO | Callsign | Image | Commenced operations |
|---|---|---|---|---|---|
| flytchad | | | | | 2018 |
| Avmax Chad | | | | | 2012 |
| RJM Aviation | | | | | 1999 |

== See also ==
- List of airlines
- List of defunct airlines of Chad
- List of airports in Chad
