= Fyt =

Fyt or FYT may refer to:

- Faya-Largeau Airport, in Chad
- Jan Fyt (1611–1661), Flemish painter
