= Air Tchad =

Airline of Chad

IATA	ICAO	Call sign
HT	HTT	HOTEL TANGO
- Founded: 24 June 1966
- Commenced operations: 4 August 1966
- Ceased operations: 2002

Air Tchad, or Air Chad, was a Chadian airline that operated domestic and regional services, as well as charter flights to neighbouring countries in Central and West Africa and charter cargo services to France, Italy and Saudi Arabia.

== History ==
The company was formed on 24 June 1966, with the government of Chad initially having two thirds of the shares and UTA holding the balance. UTA provided the airline with technical and operational assistance. Operations started on 4 August the same year, replacing services formerly provided by Air Afrique. At the end of 1966 the airline had carried 7,000 passengers and 240 tonnes (240 long tons; 260 short tons) of freight.

Flown with one Baron, one Cherokee Six, two DC-3s and one DC-4, at March 1975 Air Tchad operated a domestic route network that included Abecher, Abou Deia, Am Timan, Ati, Bokoro, Bol, Bongor, Faya Largeau, Fort Archambault, Mongo, Moundou, Ndjamena, Oum Hadjer and Pala, along with an international flight to Geneina in Sudan. Ten years later, the domestic route network had reduced to include Abecher, Mongo, Moundou, Ndjamena, and Sarh, with flights to Bangui in the Central African Republic and Geneina also undertaken; a single Fokker F27-500 served the entire network. Flights to Bangui were terminated in January 1986.

In the 1990s, the Chadian government boosted its shareholding in the airline to 98%, with UTA's participation being reduced to the remainder.

== See also ==
- List of defunct airlines of Chad
- Transport in Chad

== Notes and references ==
=== Bibliography ===
- Guttery, Ben R. (1998). Encyclopedia of African Airlines. Jefferson, North Carolina: McFarland & Company, Inc. ISBN 0-7864-0495-7.
