= Cotton Price Stabilization Board =

The Cotton Price Stabilization Board (French: Caisse de Stabilisation des Prix du Coton, CSPC) was a Chadian governmental board created in 1965. Its task was to stabilize prices paid to peasant producers by funding operating losses incurred by Cotontchad, the parastatal giant that bought, ginned and sold all the cotton produced in Chad. The CSPC also played an important role in the program to improve yields; it is estimated that between 1971 and 1983, 57% of all payments by the CSPC were made in conjunction with the program to improve cotton production. As for the funding of the CSPC, between 1971 and 1983, virtually all income to the CSPC derived from rebates paid by Cotontchad into the system. After 1984, the sharply reduced income of Cotontchad made the system for paying the producers heavily dependent on external sources of funds (such as Stabex), while the government completely exempted Cotontchad from the rebates to the CSPC. The difficulties of the CSPC, whose staff had already been considerably reduced in the late 1980s, came to a head with the great recession that hit the cotton market between 1991 and 1993, leading to the abolition of the board in 1993. It was decided to let the prices paid to the producers fluctuate freely, following the international price of cotton.
