= Zoé's Ark =

French charitable organization

Zoé's Ark (French: L'Arche de Zoé) is a French charity organization with the aim of increasing awareness of the crisis in Darfur and providing aid for children affected by the conflict. The organization was brought into the public's awareness in 2007 with the arrest of six members and 11 others in Abéché, Chad accused of abducting 103 African children.

== History ==
Zoé's Ark was formed "by motoring enthusiasts from the French four-wheel-drive community to aid victims of the December 2004 Asian tsunami". More specifically, Zoé's Ark was founded in 2005 by volunteer fireman Éric Breteau, former president of the French 4x4 Federation, who named it after a girl orphaned by the December 2004 Asian tsunami. The group, registered as a non-governmental organization with the French authorities, sought to aid children affected by the tsunami, and brought one boy to France for an operation.

== 2007 controversy ==
On Tuesday, 30 October 2007, six members of the charity organization Zoé's Ark were formally charged by the government of Chad for child abduction. Three journalists, seven Spanish flight crew members, and four Chadian and Sudanese nationals, including two Chadian officials, were also charged for complicity. Despite the group's claim that the children were orphans from Darfur who were being taken to be fostered in France, most of the children have been found to be Chadian, and to have at least one living parent or guardian. French president Nicolas Sarkozy successfully negotiated the dropping of charges and release of the journalists and flight crew members prior to trial. Six members of the group were convicted on 26 December 2007 and sentenced to eight years of forced labor, although under an accord between Chad and France they will serve their sentences in France, which has no forced labor in its penal system. Each of the six was also ordered to pay each of the 103 victims restitution equal to approximately $87,000, which amounts to $8.9M total. The founder, Eric Breteau, is among the six. A Chadian national and a Sudanese national were each also sentenced to four years. The two Chadian officials were acquitted. In March 2008 the president of Chad pardoned the convicted aid-workers. They were then released from the prisons in France.
