= Djérabé Ndigngar =

Chadian rapper and film director (born 1992)

- Born: 1992 (age 33–34); Moundou, Chad
- Other names: D 8 Alfariss
- Occupations: Film director, film producer, rapper
- Years active: 2008–present

Djérabé Ndigngar (born 1992) is a Chadian rapper and film director.

== Biography ==
Ndigngar was born in Moundou, Chad, and grew up aspiring to be a computer hacker. At the age of 16, he began his rap career under the moniker D 8 Alfariss. The first video he made and edited was "Mara ban wa", a song about orphans. Ndigngar began making music videos for artists from Moundou and then artists from N'Djamena, sparking his gola to become the greatest Chadian director. He obtained his baccalaureate in 2013 and moved to the Ivory Coast to study audiovisual communication.

In 2014, he created SaTchaProd, the first platform dedicated to the production and promotion of Chadian music. It aims to help Chadian musicians make a living from their art, and also promotes Chadian cinema. After receiving his BTS, Ndigngar found a job at the French distribution company Côte Ouest Audiovisuel and worked in this position for two years.

He launched Satchaprodmusic.com in September 2019, with a legal download service through Airtel money. In December 2019, he moved the production office of SaTchaProd from Abidjan, where it was originally located, to N'Djamena. He set up a database so that people could listen to music from previous years. Ndigngar requested help from the Ministry of Culture for its most difficult task, digitizing over 500 cassettes. He also created a promotion for Chadian artists to make professional-quality video clips for their songs.
