= Chadian Air Force =

Air warfare branch of Chad's military

- القوات الجوية التشادية
- Chadian Air Force roundel
- Founded: 1961; 65 years ago
- Country: Chad
- Type: Air force
- Role: Aerial warfare
- Size: 350 personnel
- Part of: Chad National Army
- Engagements: Chadian Civil War (1965–1979); Chadian–Libyan conflict Chadian Civil War (2005–2010); Boko Haram insurgency

Insignia
- Roundel

- Fin flash

Aircraft flown
- Attack: Su-25
- Fighter: MiG-29
- Helicopter: Mil Mi-24, Mil Mi-17, Eurocopter Fennec
- Reconnaissance: Cessna 208
- Trainer: Pilatus PC-9, Pilatus PC-7, SF.260
- Transport: Antonov An-26, C-130 Hercules, C-27J Spartan, Cessna 208

The Chadian Air Force (Arabic: القوات الجوية التشادية; French: l'armée de l'air Tchadienne) is the aviation branch of the Chad National Army. It was formed in 1961 as the Chadian National Flight/Squadron (Escadrille Nationale Tchadienne or ENT).

== History ==
=== Beginnings ===
As of 1969, the Escadrille Nationale Tchadienne was equipped with five Douglas C-47 cargo aircraft and three Max Holste MH.1521 Broussard liaison aircraft. Most of them were operated by French crews, because there were very few native pilots. In the mid-1970s, it was reinforced by six AD-4N Skyraiders, as well as some additional C-47 and Douglas C-54 transports, the total number of which reached 13 by that time. All of these were donated by France, and most were still crewed by the French. Three Reims-Cessna FTB337s were also delivered in 1977.

=== First combat operations ===
The ENT participated in its first major combat operations in June–July 1977, against Libyan-supported FROLINAT rebels. Following an attack on Zouar, reconnaissance missions were launched from the Faya-Largeau Airport. The first attack sorties were flown by Skyraiders on 1 July. Bombs, rockets and cannons were used against the rebel positions, but nearly every aircraft involved was damaged by ground fire. The next day, tactics were changed, with the pilots deciding to attack from altitudes as low as 60 m, releasing all of their weapons in a single pass. Even though the exposure to return fire was reduced, several aircraft were damaged by the explosions of bombs and rockets. On 3 July, a Skyraider received a hit in its engine, and its pilot was forced to land on an abandoned airstrip near Zouar. He was quickly recovered by his wingman. A team of technicians later arrived on board a C-47, and repaired the aircraft, which was flown out the next day. Despite the ENT's efforts, Zouar was overrun by the FROLINAT on 6 July.

Following several months of preparations, the FROLINAT's next major attack came in January 1978. All of the ANT's garrisons in the Tibesti were overrun. The FROLINAT and the Libyan Army's advance was monitored by the ENT. During one of such missions, on 29 January, a C-47 was hit by a 9K32 Strela-2 (SA-7) MANPADS while flying at a very low altitude, and it crashed; its whole crew was killed. The next day, a rescue operation was organised, with a C-54 being deployed to Faya-Largeau to support one Skyraider and one French Army Light Aviation SA 330 Puma helicopter. However, a few minutes after taking off from Faya-Largeau, the C-54 was hit by two SA-7s, and its pilot performed an emergency landing while two of the aircraft's engines were on fire. All five crew members survived, and were picked up by the Puma helicopter. The SA-7 threat effectively put an end to the ENT's operations in the Faya area. Unsupported, the town's garrison collapsed on 18 February.

In the face of the Libyan-supported rebel onslaught, the Chadian president, General Félix Malloum, requested a French military intervention. The French government agreed, and thus Opération Tacaud was launched in early April. The ENT went back into action on 16 April during the FROLINAT's offensive on Salal, together with French Air Force aircraft. One of its Skyraiders was shot down by an SA-7, and its pilot was killed. Even though the ANT garrison in Salal was eventually overrun by the insurgents, the French intervention was successful in stopping the rebels' advance towards the capital, N'Djamena. It also exacerbated the dissensions between the different rebel factions. The situation culminated in late summer 1978, when Hissène Habré's faction, the Armed Forces of the North (Forces Armées du Nord or FAN), defected and joined the government's forces. In turn, Habré was appointed as Chad's prime minister by Malloum. This alliance did not last for long however, and in February 1979, Habré deployed his forces around N'Djamena. These launched their attack on 11 February. The ENT and the French forces deployed there attempted to help Malloum's embattled government. In reaction, Habré declared that he would not be able to guarantee the security of the expatriates living in the city, should the bombardments continue. This caused the French forces to stop the bombardment. The foreigners were then evacuated by French transport aircraft, followed by the French troops present there. This caused the ENT to completely cease its operations: without access to the French personnel that was operating its aircraft, it was de facto disbanded.

=== Reconstitution ===
The Chadian air arm was reconstituted in 1984 as the Armée de l'Air Tchadienne. The first aircraft of the reestablished air force were four Lockheed C-130As donated by the United States. As of 1986, it was also operating three C-47s, one C-54, one CASA C-212 and two Pilatus PC-7s. At that time, its commander was Captain Mornadji Mbaissanabe, and it numbered around 200 personnel. It depended on the French for maintenance tasks, and most of its pilots were French or Zairian, with only a few Chadians. The AAT's C-130 fleet was extensively used to support FANT troops deployed in the North of the country during the Toyota War. In late 1987, one of these aircraft was abandoned after it caught fire at an airstrip near Yebbibou.

=== Expansion ===
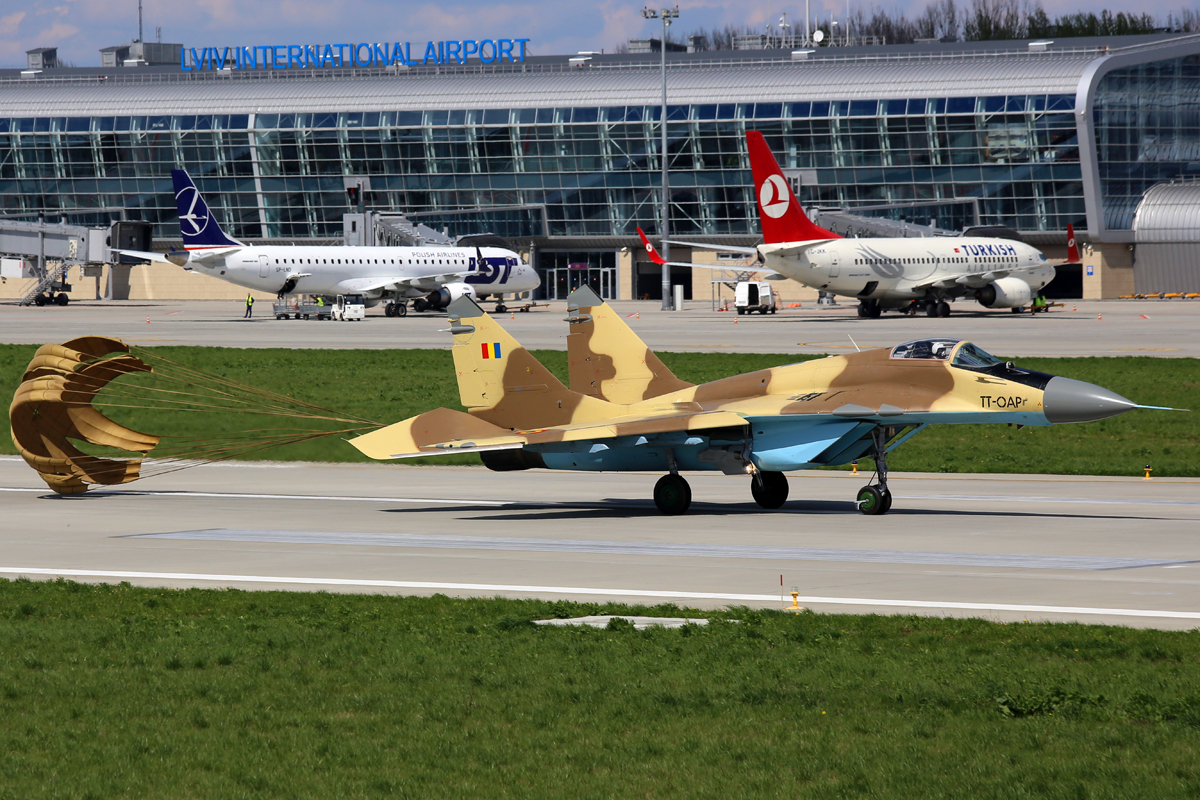
A Chadian MiG-29 landing at Lviv International Airport with drogue parachute deployed

Following the end of the Chadian-Libyan conflict, relations with Libya were normalised in 1994. Starting in the mid-1990s, the AAT started to grow slowly but steadily. In 1995, two second-hand Aérospatiale Alouette IIIs were bought from the Netherlands. Two Mil Mi-24Ds and one Mil Mi-17 were also purchased in the late 1990s. Libya donated two Antonov An-26s in the same period, and two SIAI-Marchetti SF.260s in 2006. Two Mi-24Vs were delivered from Ukraine in 2000, as well as four Mi-17s in 2001 and 2006. Four more Mi-24Vs were delivered from the same source in 2007–2008. The expansion of the AAT in this period was fuelled by royalties from oil exports that started in the mid-2000s. In 2005, one of the two PC-7s donated by France in the 1980s was overhauled by the company Griffon Aerospace, which also bought another on the civilian market in the United States. The same company then purchased a single Pilatus PC-9 directly from Swiss manufacturer Pilatus Aircraft, and contracted around 50 French, Algerian and Mexican personnel to serve in the AAT. Griffon Aerospace then proceeded to modify one Mi-17V-5, three Mi-24Vs and the PC-9 with hardpoints allowing them to carry Mark 81 and Mark 82 bombs, sourced from Pakistan. The three Mi-24Vs were also made compatible with night-vision goggles. The weaponisation of the PC-9 caused a scandal in Switzerland, as the Chadian government had promised it would not be used in a combat role. This affair marked the end of Griffon Aerospace's work in Chad, and all of its employees left the country by March 2008.

However, these had meanwhile been involved in combat operations. Contracted instructors flew with less experienced Chadian pilots, especially during nocturnal sorties. They also flew Mi-17s and Mi-24s during the 2008 Battle of N'Djamena, attacking insurgent technicals. The single PC-9 also flew attacks in Darfur in January 2008, despite the Chadian government's pledge. The AAT was also heavily involved in beating back a rebel invasion from neighboring Sudan in 2009. Sudanese officials also claimed that Chad aircraft made several cross-border raids into Sudan during the conflict. The high-profile acquisition of this period was a batch of six Sukhoi Su-25s (four single-seat and two twin-seat aircraft), delivered from Ukraine between 2008 and 2010. This country also provided for a large portion of the mercenaries serving in the air force, even though Chadian personnel started undergoing training in France and Ethiopia, and has started to gradually replace foreigners in more recent years. Six Eurocopter Fennecs were also obtained from the Republic of Singapore Air Force in 2008–2010. It was at that time that different squadrons were created, including one each of fighter, liaison, transport and helicopter squadrons.

Four additional Su-25s bought in Ukraine were delivered in 2013, and the first of three Mikoyan MiG-29s arrived the next year. Two Alenia C-27J Spartans were also taken on strength in 2013–2014. In 2015, Chadian Air Force Su-25s participated in the fighting against Boko Haram, in neighbouring Cameroon and Nigeria. Several aircraft and helicopters were damaged in a storm on 1 July 2017 that struck the air force's main base at N'Djamena International Airport. The severity of the storm was amplified by the use of fabric hangar coverings. Losses or damaged equipment included three helicopters, a PC-12, a MiG-29 fighter, and two Su-25 attack planes.

The force shared a base with French forces at N'Djamena International Airport until January 2025 when the French withdrew.

== Aircraft ==
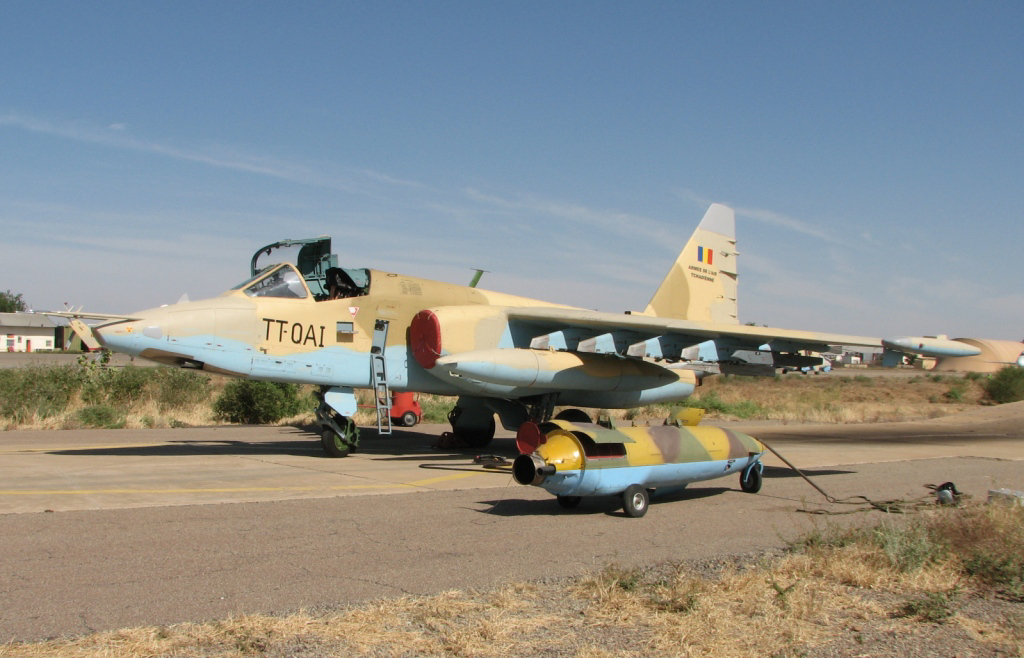
A Sukhoi Su-25 at N'Djamena International Airport

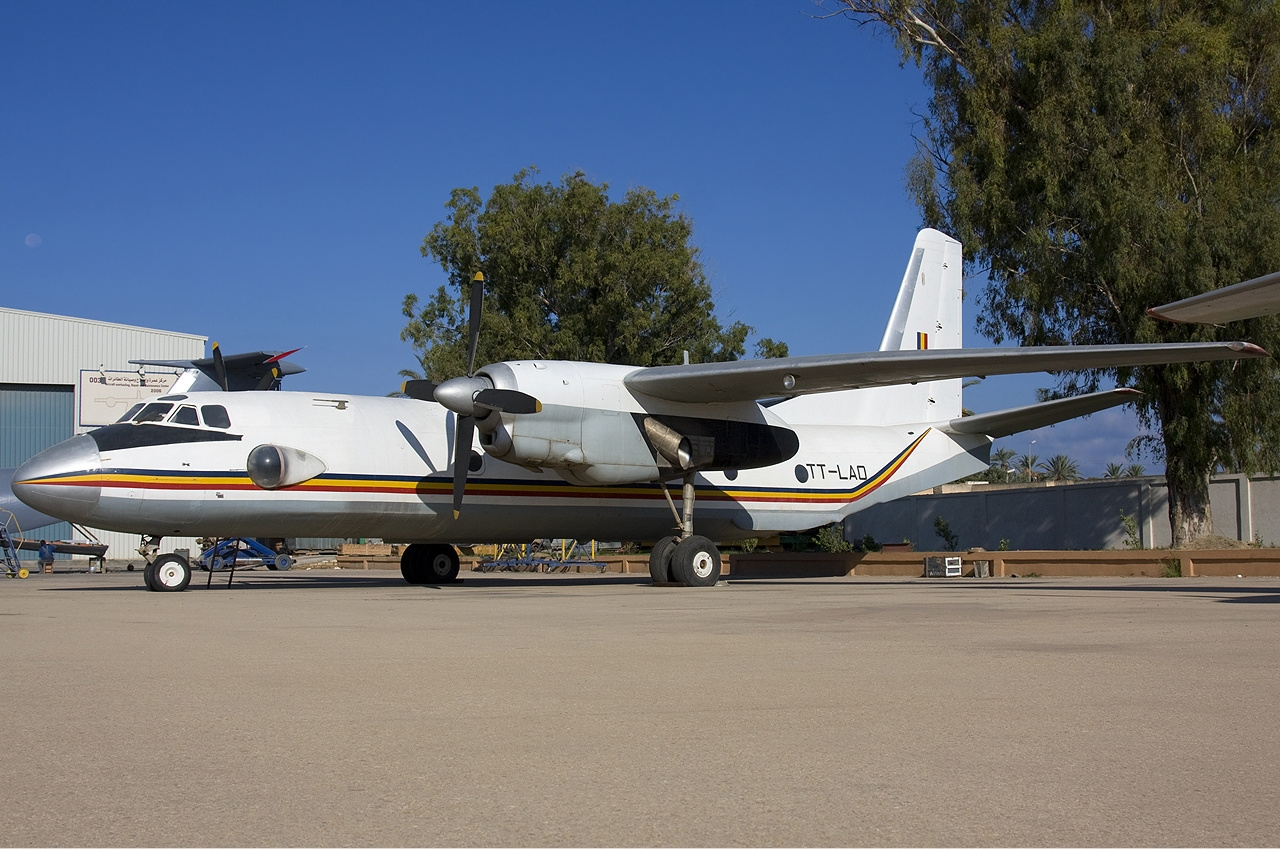
An Antonov An-26

=== Current inventory ===
Aircraft	Origin	Type	Variant	In service	Notes
Combat aircraft
Sukhoi Su-25	Soviet Union	Attack aircraft		7	
Transport
Cessna 208	United States	Transport / ISR		4	
C-27J Spartan	Italy	Transport		1	
Antonov An-26	Soviet Union	Transport		3	
C-130 Hercules	United States	Transport	C-130H	1	
Helicopters
Mil Mi-17	Russia	Utility	Mi-8/17/171	6	
Mil Mi-24	Soviet Union	Attack	Mi-35	3	
Alouette III	France	Light utility		1	
Eurocopter AS550	France	Light utility		6	
Trainer aircraft
Pilatus PC-9	Switzerland	Basic / Advanced trainer		1	
Sukhoi Su-25	Soviet Union	Jet trainer	Su-25UB	2	
Pilatus PC-7	Switzerland	Trainer		2	
TAI Hürkuş	Turkey	Advanced trainer/light attack	C	3	
UAV
TAI Anka	Turkey	UCAV	Anka S	2	
TAI Aksungur	Turkey	UCAV		2	

=== Aircraft ===
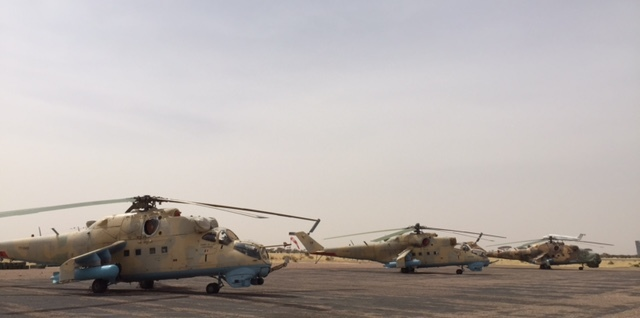
Mil Mi-24s at Diffa Airport, Niger

Operational aircraft of the force may be far less than official figures represent. According to a report in Le Figaro in April 2006, the Chadian Air Force consisted only of two Lockheed C-130 Hercules transports, one working Mil Mi-17 helicopter, and two non-working Mil Mi-24 helicopters. Later C-130 TT-PAF was lost in a landing accident at Abéché, on 11 June 2006.

== Incidents ==
The Aviation Safety Network listed four incidents between 1976 and 1987, one involving a Douglas DC-3, a Douglas DC-4 that was shot down by a Surface-to-air missile and the remaining two with the C-130 Hercules transports, one crashing during a routine takeoff, the other during a landing.

In 2004, while transporting journalists and UN officials to a tarmac meeting with Kofi Annan, one of the Chadian helicopters malfunctioned and made a rough landing in the desert.

== Sources ==
- Cooper, Tom; Grandolini, Albert; Delalande, Arnaud (2015). Libyan Air Wars, Part 1: 1973-1985. Helion & Company Publishing. ISBN 978-1-909982-39-0.
- Cooper, Tom; Grandolini, Albert; Delalande, Arnaud (2016). Libyan Air Wars, Part 3: 1986-1989. Helion & Company Publishing. ISBN 978-1-910294-54-3.
- Cooper, Tom & Weinert, Peter (2010). African MiGs: Volume I: Angola to Ivory Coast. Harpia Publishing LLC. ISBN 978-0-9825539-5-4.
