= Mid Express Tchad =

Airline of Chad

IATA	ICAO	Call sign
-	-	-
- Founded: 2008
- Ceased operations: 2008
- Hubs: N'Djamena International Airport
- Fleet size: 1
- Headquarters: N'Djamena, Chad

Mid Express Tchad was a cargo airline based in N'Djamena, Chad. It was established as AMW Tchad in 2007 and rebranded Mid-Express Tchad the following year.

== Fleet ==
The Mid-Express Tchad fleet included the following aircraft (as of 4 July 2009):

- 1 Boeing 707-300 (stored)
