= Lac Wey Department =

Department of Logone Occidental, Chad

Coordinates: 8°34′N 16°05′E

Lac Wey is one of four departments in Logone Occidental, a region of Chad. Its capital is Moundou. It was created by decree N° 415/PR/MAT/02 and 419/PR/MAT/02.

== See also ==
- Departments of Chad
