= Mahamat Djarma Khatir =

Chadian politician

Mahamat Djarma Khatir, Chad politician born in 1943, was mayor of Fort-Lamy (1972–1975) and former member of National Liberation Front of Chad (FROLINAT). Involved in politics during the democratic process, he founded later a Sufi-based religious movement called Faydah al Djariyya. He currently lives in exile after joining rebels fighting against Idriss Déby Itno.
