= Cotontchad =

The Société cotonnière du Tchad, also called Cotontchad, is a parastatal Chadian company operating in a monopoly regime that buys and exports all the cotton produced in Chad. Cotton represents 40% of the country's exports and in past years has been even more dominant.

It was created in 1971 from the nationalisation of the Franco-Belgian society Cotonfran and had the task to collect, buy, gin, transport and export the cotton crop.

At present the state owns 75% of the company, the French Textile Development Company (Compagnie Française pour le Développement des Textiles or CFDT) 16%, a consortium of Chadian banks 6% and the French Development Agency 2%.

The CFDT's main role is to market Chad's cotton on the world market, while private banks provide the credits necessary to Cotontchad and to the peasants to finance the opening of each planting season and especially to provide capital for the import and distribution of fertilisers and insecticides. Originally the producers were protected from market fluctuations by the Cotton Price Stabilization Board (Caisse de Stabilisation des Prix du Coton or CSPC), created in 1968, whose task was to stabilise prices paid to peasant producers by funding operating losses incurred by Cotontchad. Assuring a constant price to the producer not only helped maintain a certain level of production for Cotontchad but also limited costs to the company by holding down producer prices. But the recession that hit the cotton market between 1991 and 1993 drastically reduced the activities of the company and led to the abolition of the CSPC in 1993 and the decision to let the prices of the cotton bought by the producers fluctuate freely, following the market. Notwithstanding, economic difficulties have continued to hamper the company to the point that its privatisation is often discussed.
