= N'Djamena International Airport =

Main airport in Chad

N'Djamena International Airport مطار انجمينا الدولي Aéroport international de N'Djaména
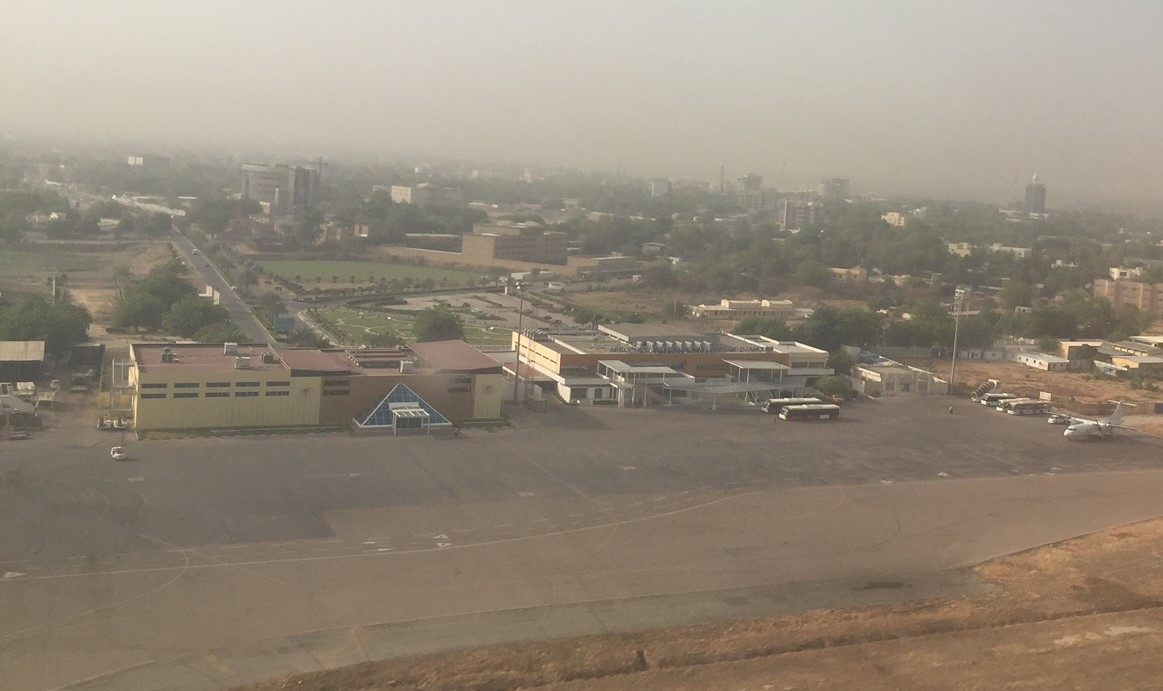
- IATA: NDJ; ICAO: FTTJ

Summary
- Airport type: Public / military
- Owner: Government
- Serves: Chad
- Elevation AMSL: 968 ft (295 m)
- Coordinates: 12°08′01″N 15°02′02″E
- Website: aeroport-ndjamena.com

Map
- Location of airport in Chad FTTJ (Africa)

Runways
Direction	Length		Surface
Direction	m	ft	Surface
05/23	2,800	9,186	Asphalt

N'Djamena International Airport (IATA: NDJ, ICAO: FTTJ) (Arabic: مطار انجمينا الدولي; French: Aéroport international de N'Djaména) serves N'Djamena, the capital city of Chad. It is the country's only international airport. The airport is dual use, with civilian and military installations on opposite sides of the single runway.

== Facilities ==
The airport resides at an elevation of 968 feet (295 m) above mean sea level. It has one runway designated 05/23 with an asphalt surface measuring 2,800 by 45 metres (9,186 ft × 148 ft).

== French military base ==
What would become Fort-Lamy Base Aerienne 172 was occupied by a permanent detachment of French Air Force aircraft from 1939 until its abandonment in 1975.

There has been a French base here since independence, the only lapses being in 1975 and again for a couple of years beginning in 1978. After Operation Epervier started, it has been extensively used by the French Air Force and Army during various operations. In 2016, Epervier was composed of about 1500 men, a dozen Mirage 2000 fighters, Puma and Caiman helicopters, and transport and tankers aircraft (C-160 Transall, Boeing KC-135, C-130 Hercules) Operations are undertaken over neighbouring Mali and Niger for Operation Barkhane, combating militant groups throughout the southern Sahara. The entire area is under the authority of COMELEF (commandement des élément français), typically a French Air Force colonel. The importance of the operation does mean that the runway is always open, and that excellent primary radar coverage is provided, as well as other facilities (military hospital, rescue and fire services, and assistance with ATC).

On September 7, 1987, a Tupolev Tu-22 of the Libyan Arab Air Force was shot down as it was bombing the French base. French Army Hawk missiles downed this aircraft, and three crew members were killed. The bombs missed their targets, falling in sandy areas.

The French base is also shared by the Chadian Air Force with Su-25 Frogfoot, Mi-24 Hind helicopters, and C-130 Hercules stationed there.

The air base will be returned from January 31, 2025, after the denunciation of the military cooperation and security defense agreements by Chadian President Mahamat Deby.

== Airlines and destinations ==
=== Passenger ===
Airlines	Destinations
Air Côte d'Ivoire	Douala
Air France	Abuja, Paris–Charles de Gaulle
ASKY Airlines	Abuja, Douala, Lomé, Yaoundé
Camair-Co	Douala, Yaoundé
Egyptair	Cairo
Ethiopian Airlines	Addis Ababa
Royal Air Maroc	Casablanca
Turkish Airlines	Istanbul, Niamey

=== Cargo ===
Airlines	Destinations
Cargolux	Luxembourg
EgyptAir Cargo	Cairo
Saudia Cargo	Dubai-Al Maktoum, Jeddah, Sharjah

== Accidents and incidents ==
- On 7 November 1951, a Douglas C-47A-80-DL (F-BEIV) of Société de Transports Aériens Camerounais (STAC) crashed during takeoff. There were no fatalities; the plane was written off.
- On 11 November 1952, a Douglas C-54B-1-DC (F-BFVO) of UAT crashed en route to Beirut shortly after takeoff, killing 5 of the 6 occupants.
- On 3 June 1955, a Douglas C-54A-5-DC (F-BFVT) of UAT overturned on landing on a cargo flight from Douala, killing all three occupants.
- On 15 February 1963, a Nord 2501 Noratlas (45) of L'Armee de L'Air was destroyed by fire while fueling.
- On 28 January 1978, Douglas C-47 TT-EAB of Air Tchad was reportedly "possibly shot down by rebels" near Tibesti. The damaged aircraft apparently landed at N'Djamena International Airport.
- On 10 March 1984, a McDonnell Douglas DC-8-63PF (F-BOLL) of UTA was parked during a 1-hour intermediate stopover in N'Djamena on a flight from Brazzaville to Paris. Shortly after arriving, however, a small bomb detonated in the baggage compartment; all 23 occupants were immediately evacuated; another explosion went off 20 minutes later, destroying the aircraft.
- On 19 September 1989, UTA Flight 772, a McDonnell Douglas DC-10-30 (registration N54629) operating the Brazzaville-N'Djamena-Paris CDG sector, was bombed 46 minutes after take-off from N'Djamena, causing the aircraft to crash while flying over Niger with 156 passengers and 14 crew members on board. There were no survivors.
- On 17 August 1995, a Boeing 707-321C (YR-ABN) of Air Afrique arriving on a cargo flight from Paris veered to the left on landing due to the no. 4 engine not reversing, and went off the runway going 10 knots (11.5 mph), with the left main landing gear striking a concrete block and collapsing. The plane was written off; all six occupants survived.
- On 24 July 2001, Vickers Viscount 3D-OHM of Transtel was damaged beyond economic repair in a take-off accident. Although written off by the insurers, the aircraft was repaired. Repairs were almost complete when a soldier accidentally discharged his gun, puncturing a fuel tank.
- On 18 September 2001, a Cessna 208 Caravan I (F-OHRM) owned by an A. Trichot was substantially damaged after being blown over by a gust of wind while standing and subsequently written off.
- On 24 January 2007, Air West Flight 612, a Boeing 737-200, landed at N'Djamena after being hijacked.
- In 2008 (date unknown), an Antonov An-12B (UP-AN208) of East Wing was damaged beyond repair in a non-fatal landing incident during a cargo flight. The right main undercarriage is reported to have collapsed.

== See also ==
- Transport in Chad
