= Moundou =

Moundou موندو
- City
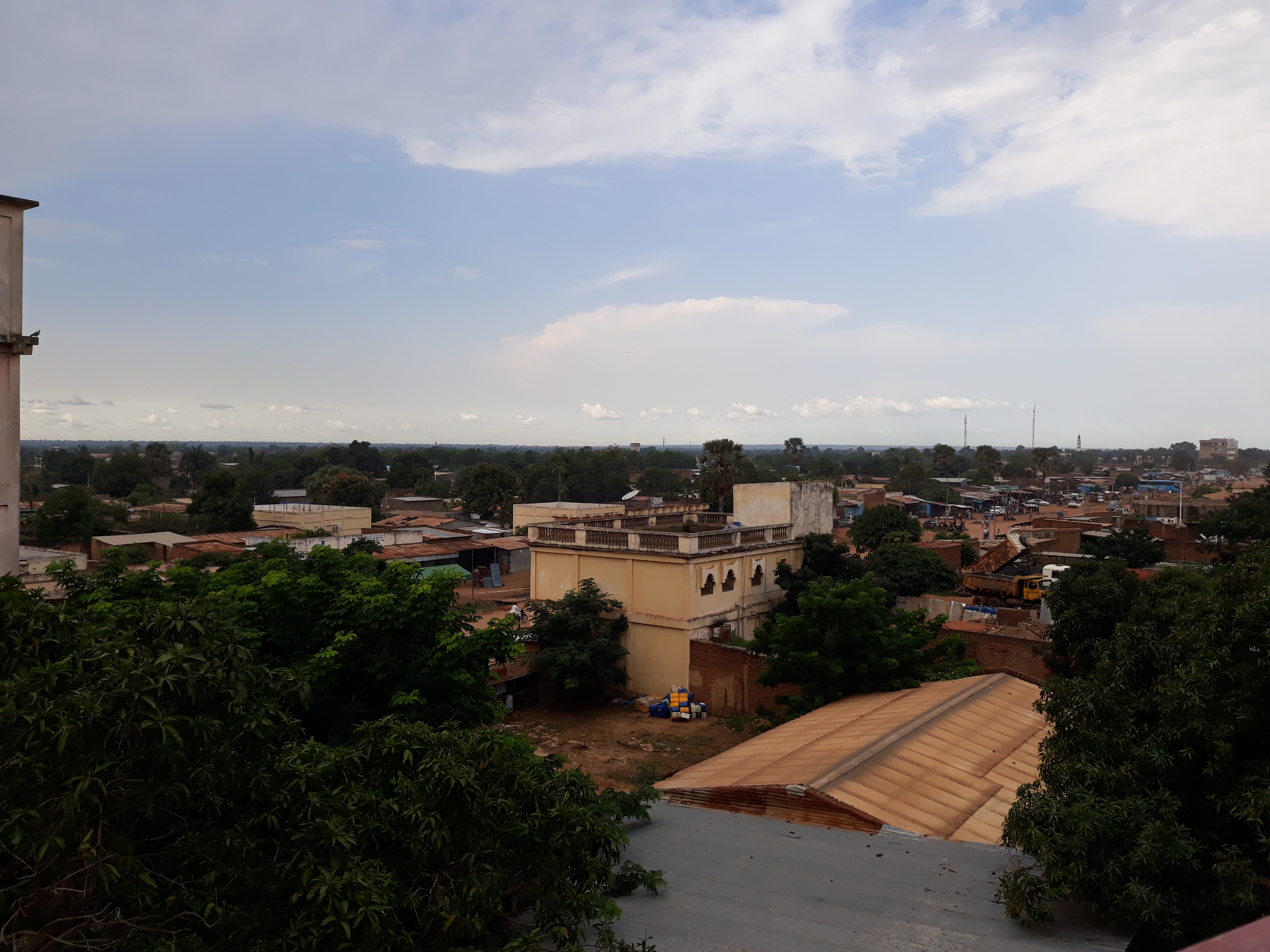
- Moundou

- Location in Chad
- Coordinates: 08°35′29″N 16°04′32″E
- Country: Chad
- Region: Logone Occidental Region
- Department: Lac Wey
- Sub-Prefecture: Moundou
- Elevation: 413 m (1,355 ft)

Population (2012)
  - Total: 137,929
- Time zone: UTC+01:00 (WAT)

Moundou (Arabic: موندو) is the second-largest city in Chad and is the capital of the region of Logone Occidental.

The city lies on the Mbéré River (a tributary of the Western Logone) some 475 kilometres south of the capital N'Djamena. It is the main city of the Ngambai people. Moundou has grown as an industrial centre, home to the Gala Brewery, which produces Chad's most popular beer and the cotton and oil industries.

== History ==
The city was created on 8 November 1923 by the French sergeant and administrator Joseph-François Reste, Lieutenant-General of Chad from 1923 to 1926 and future Governor General of French Equatorial Africa, who, from the whaleboat upon which he navigated the Logone, found the site pretty. By 1916, the military conquest of Chad was completed, however movements of resistance to the colonial regime took place. It was especially in the southwest of the country that dissensions continued until about 1930. He decided to found the post of Moundou in the centre of the rebellious zone. The rebellious situation did not change much with the arrival of Lieutenant Robert Reverdy. Chief of the district of the Middle Logone in 1925, Reverdy, who became a director in 1927, completed an uninterrupted stay for five years and eight months. He moved the chief town of the district to Moundou in 1927. Riding the country, on horseback and by litter, he subjected the organisation of strong chieftains, first of village then of township.

On 20 April 1930, Governor Georges Prouteaux of Oubangi-Chari (the district was attached to Oubangui-Chari in 1926) signed a decision reorganising the "indigenous of the Middle Logone" by creating 40 cantons, divided into five subdivisions. Reverdy had his right-hand man, local chief Hassan Moundou or Hassan Baguirmi, of Baguirmian or rather Baguirmianised Dekakire Arab origin, installed as chief of the township of Moundou. Not all chiefs were of traditional origin. In the animist country, custom only recognised clan chiefs or war or initiation leaders, who were strictly specialised and temporary. However, the system was accepted by the population, and some chiefs remained in office for more than a quarter of a century. Their descendants are still in place today.

Reverdy (called Baoguel, the "Left-Handed", in the Ngambay language) urbanised the post of Moundou that he established. He planted the flowers (from February to May) that line the roads of Moundou, which became the origin of the nickname of the city during the colonial period, "Moundou-la-Rouge".

In 1926 the Cotton Company of the Congo installed a ginning factory in Moundou. The cotton company later became Cotonfran in 1928 and then CotonTchad in 1972.

The first cadastral map of the town of Moundou was manufactured on 2 February 1926. Since there were not, at the time, the materials for substantial topographical surveys, the drainage pipeline of the town was facing the river in the belief that the natural inclination would head toward the river, when in reality the river level is higher than the level of the city. In 2012, the mayor of Moundou, Laoukein Kourayo Médard, said that "every time there was a flood, all the waters of the Logone discharged to Lake Wey (in the West), which in turn sprays its water into the city, flooding Moundou entirely."

== Geography ==
=== Climate ===
Like other parts of southern Chad and the East Sudanian savanna, Moundou has a typical tropical savanna climate (Köppen Aw), with a wet season and a dry season and the temperature being hot year-round. The average annual high temperature is 34.0 °C (93.2 °F), while the average annual low temperature is 20.1 °C (68.2 °F). The hottest time of year is from March to May, just before the wet season starts. March has the highest average high at 38.6 °C (101.5 °F), while the highest average low is 24.2 °C (75.6 °F) in April. August has the lowest average high at 29.8 °C (85.6 °F) (the only average high below 30.0 °C (86.0 °F)), while December has the lowest average low at 14.6 °C (58.3 °F).

Moundou receives 1,082.8 millimetres (42.63 in) of rain over 85 precipitation days, with a distinct wet and dry season like most tropical savanna climates. December and January receive no precipitation at all, with almost no rain falling from November to March. August, the wettest month, receives 284.8 millimetres (11.21 in) of rainfall on average. August also has 19 precipitation days, which is the most of any month. Humidity is much higher in the wet season than the dry season, with February having a humidity at just 28% and August having a humidity at 81%. Moundou receives 2810.4 hours of sunshine annually on average, with the sunshine being distributed fairly evenly across the year, although it is lower during the wet season. December receives the most sunshine, while August receives the least.

Climate data for Moundou (1961-1990)
Month	Jan	Feb	Mar	Apr	May	Jun	Jul	Aug	Sep	Oct	Nov	Dec	Year
Mean daily maximum °C (°F)	34.1 (93.4)	36.7 (98.1)	38.6 (101.5)	38.0 (100.4)	35.7 (96.3)	32.3 (90.1)	30.2 (86.4)	29.8 (85.6)	30.7 (87.3)	33.1 (91.6)	35.1 (95.2)	34.2 (93.6)	34.0 (93.2)
Mean daily minimum °C (°F)	15.1 (59.2)	18.3 (64.9)	22.5 (72.5)	24.2 (75.6)	23.5 (74.3)	22.1 (71.8)	21.2 (70.2)	21.0 (69.8)	20.8 (69.4)	21.0 (69.8)	17.4 (63.3)	14.6 (58.3)	20.1 (68.2)
Average rainfall mm (inches)	0.0 (0.0)	0.2 (0.01)	4.6 (0.18)	39.2 (1.54)	89.8 (3.54)	147.7 (5.81)	257.8 (10.15)	284.8 (11.21)	200.1 (7.88)	57.1 (2.25)	1.5 (0.06)	0.0 (0.0)	1,082.8 (42.63)
Average rainy days (≥ 0.1 mm)	0	1	2	5	9	12	15	19	13	7	2	0	85
Average relative humidity (%)	36	28	31	50	63	73	80	81	78	73	56	45	58
Mean monthly sunshine hours	279.0	249.2	248.0	234.0	241.8	210.0	182.9	170.5	186.0	235.6	282.0	291.4	2,810.4
Mean daily sunshine hours	9.0	8.9	8.0	7.8	7.8	7.0	5.9	5.5	6.2	7.6	9.4	9.4	7.7
Source 1: World Meteorological Organization
Source 2: NOAA (sun and humidity)

=== Municipal districts ===
There are four quarters or municipal districts of Moundou, further subdivided into 20 neighbourhoods:

  - First district:
    1. DOMBAO neighbourhood
    2. DOYON neighbourhood
    3. TAYE neighbourhood (also spelt Tayeh)
    4. BEBANDJI neighbourhood
    5. KOUDJIRIKO neighbourhood
    6. NGARA neighbourhood
  - Second district:
    1. NGUELBE neighbourhood
    2. BAGUIRMI neighbourhood
    3. BOURNOU neighbourhood
    4. HAUSA neighbourhood
  - Third district:
    1. GUELKOURA neighbourhood
    2. QUINZE ANS (fifteen years) neighbourhood
    3. DOUMBEUR I neighbourhood (also spelt Dombeur)
    4. DOHERI neighbourhood
    5. MBAGUE neighbourhood
  - Fourth district:
    1. MBOMBAYA neighbourhood
    2. GUELDJEM neighbourhood
    3. DOMBEUR II neighbourhood (also spelt Doumbeur)
    4. KOUTOU GUELMBAGUE neighbourhood
    5. MADANA neighbourhood

=== Demographics ===
Year	Population
1993	99,530
2008	142,462

== Economy ==
The city has an industry of ginning and processing of cotton (oil and soap) under CotonTchad. The export of cotton was done before the discovery of oil, the current main source of income for Chad. Cotton cultivation has been funded by French corporations (through the CCCE, now the AFD, and the public company Dagris, now Geocoton) and the European Development Fund of the European Union.

The city has also a historical beer industry through the Brasseries du Logone and the Gala brand, synonymous with luxury beer in Chad and in Cameroon.

Cigarettes are made in the city by the Manufacture des Cigarettes du Tchad (MCT) company.

== Transports ==
Moundou is situated on one of the main roads in southern Chad. The road runs from Léré on the border with Cameroon, through Pala, Kélo, Moundou, Doba, Koumra and Sarh.

The town is served by Moundou Airport (IATA: MQQ, ICAO: FTTD), with a paved runway.

== Education ==
Moundou is home to several schools and, since 2002, a higher education institution, the University of Moundou (fr), which was created by ordinance No. 013 / PR / 2008 of 5 March 2008. The current university used to be the Moundou University Institute of Business Techniques or IUTEM (Institut universitaire des techniques d'entreprise de Moundou) which was created by Law No. 10 / PR / 02 of 2 September 2002.

=== Primary schools ===
- Ecole Taye
- Ecole Doumbeur II
- CEG Communautaire de Doumbeur 2
- Centre Scolaire de Ku-Jéricho
- Ecole Officielle de Belle Vue de Moundou (Ecole Belle Vue)
- Ecole du Centre
- Ecole d'application de Moundou
- Ecole Quinze Ans
- Ecole Dombao

=== Secondary schools ===
- Lycée Adoum d'Allah (public)
- Notre Dame College of Chad (closed)
- Lycée Technique Commercial de Moundou
- Lycée-Collège de l'Amitié (LYCAM)
- Lycée Djarabé
- Lycée Palais Du Savoir de Moundou
- Lycée Guelkol
- CEG No. 2
- College du Lac Taba
- Ecole Enfants Unis
- Lycée Le Héros
- Lycée Communal
- Collège Evangelique Gary

=== Other schools ===
- Ecole des Sourds de Moundou

== Places of worship ==
Among the places of worship, they are predominantly Muslim mosques. There are also Christian churches and temples : Roman Catholic Diocese of Moundou (Catholic Church), Evangelical Church of Chad, Christian Assemblies in Chad (Plymouth Brethren).

== Twin towns/sister cities ==
Moundou is twinned with:

- Poitiers, France since 1990

== Notable people ==
- Djérabé Ndigngar (born 1992) - rapper

== See also ==
- Sacred Heart Cathedral, Moundou
