= Mbéré River =

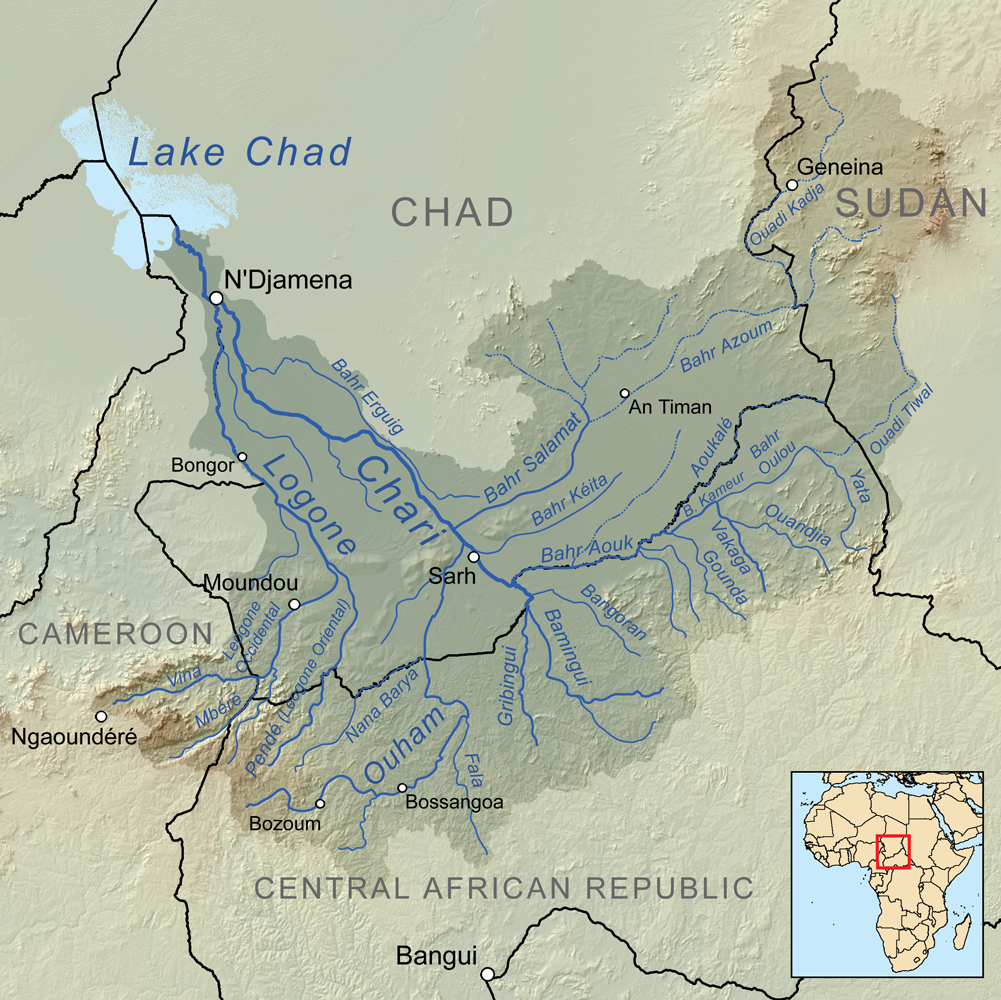
- Map showing the Mbéré River within the Chari River drainage basin

Location
- Countries: Chad; Cameroon; Central African Republic

The Mbéré River is a river in Cameroon and Chad. It forms part of the two countries' border with Central African Republic. It is a tributary of the Logone River.
