= Abéché =

Abéché أبشه
- City
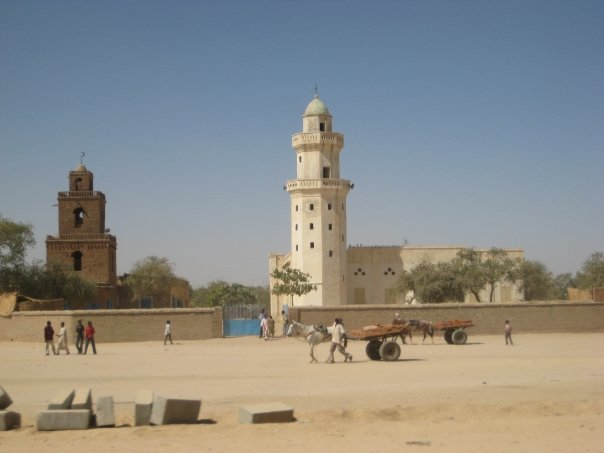
- The Grand Mosque of Abéché on the central square (the Place de l'Indépendance)

- Location in Chad
- Coordinates: 13°49′59″N 20°50′05″E
- Country: Chad
- Province: Ouaddaï Region
- Department: Ouara Department
- Sub-Prefecture: Abéché
- Elevation: 542 m (1,778 ft)

Population (2012)
  - Total: 76,492
- Time zone: UTC+01:00 (WAT)

Abéché (Arabic: أبشه, Absha) is a city in central-eastern Chad and the capital of the Ouaddaï Region. By road it is 749 kilometres (465 mi) northeast of the national capital of N'Djamena and 164 kilometres (102 mi) northwest of Adre, on the border with Sudan. Surrounded by savanna, it is one of the largest cities in the country. It has a rich Islamic heritage, situated along the trans-Saharan trade route and is an important cattle raising centre, with the principal market in the country for camel exports and rugs. As of 2012 it had a population of 76,492 people.

The city contains the remnants of the ancient capital, including palaces, mosques, and the tombs of former sultans. The Grand Mosque on the central square (the Place de l'Indépendance), is one of the oldest and most significant mosques in the country, built in the 19th century. The city is served by Abéché Airport and contains the Lycee Franco-Arabe school.

== History ==
From the early 19th century, Abéché was at the centre of the Islamic slave trade in Chad and an important city in the developing of the religion in the region. Situated along the trans-Saharan trade route, many Islamic scholars and merchants travelled through the city.

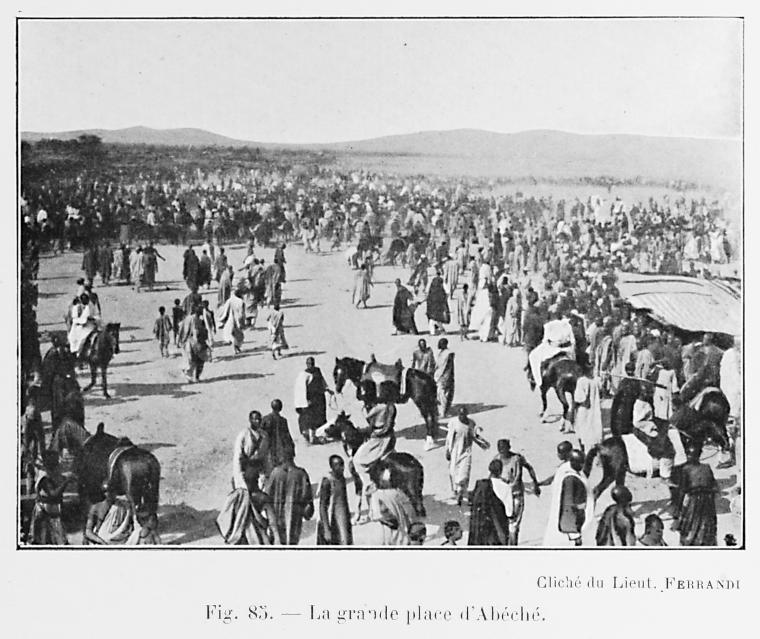
Abéché Market (1918)

The city of Abéché was made capital of the Wadai Sultanate in the 1890s, after the wells at Ouara, the former capital, had dried out. In 1909, French troops invaded the Kingdom and established a garrison in Abéché, forcing the sultan to renounce his throne. At that time, Abéché was the largest city in Chad with 28,000 people, but major epidemics reduced the population to 6,000 in 1919.

In 1935, the sultanate was restored by orders of the French government, and Muhammed Ouarada, heir to the throne after his father became king.

On 25 November 2006, the city was taken by the Union of Forces for Democracy, a rebel group that sought to depose president Idriss Déby. Extensive looting took place during the night. On the same day, nearby Biltine was captured by the Rally of Democratic Forces, another rebel group. A day later, both cities were retaken by the Chadian army.

On 30 October 2007, the city came to international attention when 17 French volunteers working for the charity Zoé's Ark were arrested there for alleged child abduction.

== Geography and climate ==
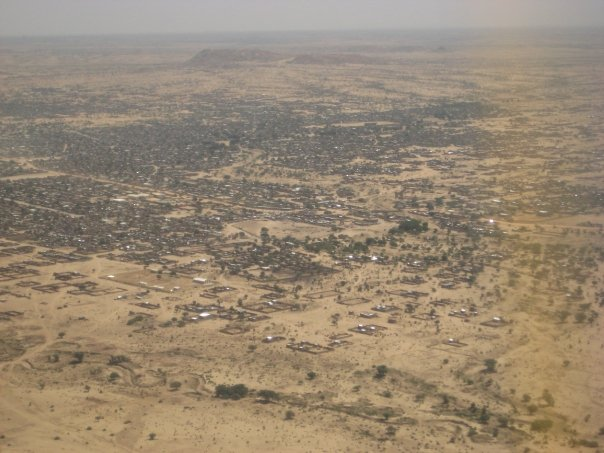
Aerial view of the city and surrounding savanna

Abéché is situated in central-eastern Chad, and by road it is 749 kilometres (465 mi) northeast of the national capital of N'Djamena, 164 kilometres (102 mi) northwest of Adre, on the border with Sudan, and roughly 90 kilometres (56 mi) southeast of Biltine.

Abéché is the hottest major city in Chad. It gets 336 afternoons a year above 32 °C (89.6 °F). Its rainy season is in mid-year, from June to September. The hottest months are from March to June. Köppen-Geiger climate classification system classifies its climate as a hot arid climate (BWh) bordering on a hot semi-arid climate (Köppen: BSh), due to its extreme potential evapotranspiration. It is one of the hottest cities on earth with average year-round daily high of over 36 °C or 97 °F, and an average daily mean of around 29 °C or 84 °F.

Climate data for Abéché (1961-1990 normals, extremes 1950–present)
Month	Jan	Feb	Mar	Apr	May	Jun	Jul	Aug	Sep	Oct	Nov	Dec	Year
Record high °C (°F)	45.0 (113.0)	46.0 (114.8)	47.5 (117.5)	49.0 (120.2)	47.5 (117.5)	46.5 (115.7)	44.0 (111.2)	40.0 (104.0)	42.0 (107.6)	44.6 (112.3)	43.0 (109.4)	43.0 (109.4)	49.0 (120.2)
Mean daily maximum °C (°F)	33.6 (92.5)	35.6 (96.1)	38.2 (100.8)	40.4 (104.7)	40.0 (104.0)	38.5 (101.3)	34.5 (94.1)	32.1 (89.8)	35.1 (95.2)	37.4 (99.3)	35.7 (96.3)	34.0 (93.2)	36.3 (97.3)
Daily mean °C (°F)	24.9 (76.8)	26.9 (80.4)	30.1 (86.2)	32.8 (91.0)	32.8 (91.0)	31.7 (89.1)	28.8 (83.8)	27.0 (80.6)	28.6 (83.5)	29.7 (85.5)	27.7 (81.9)	25.5 (77.9)	28.9 (84.0)
Mean daily minimum °C (°F)	16.1 (61.0)	18.2 (64.8)	22.0 (71.6)	25.1 (77.2)	25.6 (78.1)	24.9 (76.8)	23.1 (73.6)	21.8 (71.2)	22.0 (71.6)	22.0 (71.6)	19.7 (67.5)	16.9 (62.4)	21.4 (70.5)
Record low °C (°F)	7.1 (44.8)	9.5 (49.1)	11.0 (51.8)	11.0 (51.8)	17.0 (62.6)	16.5 (61.7)	15.0 (59.0)	15.5 (59.9)	15.5 (59.9)	12.5 (54.5)	11.5 (52.7)	8.6 (47.5)	7.1 (44.8)
Average precipitation mm (inches)	0.0 (0.0)	0.0 (0.0)	0.1 (0.00)	3.2 (0.13)	12.1 (0.48)	34.6 (1.36)	98.1 (3.86)	166.2 (6.54)	53.4 (2.10)	5.1 (0.20)	0.1 (0.00)	0.0 (0.0)	372.8 (14.68)
Average precipitation days (≥ 0.1 mm)	0	0	1	2	4	6	12	14	7	2	1	0	49
Average relative humidity (%)	20	17	16	18	27	41	60	71	61	35	23	23	34
Average dew point °C (°F)	0.4 (32.7)	−0.2 (31.6)	1.5 (34.7)	5.3 (41.5)	11.3 (52.3)	16.8 (62.2)	20.2 (68.4)	21.3 (70.3)	20.3 (68.5)	12.6 (54.7)	4.7 (40.5)	2.8 (37.0)	9.7 (49.5)
Mean monthly sunshine hours	316.2	291.2	300.7	300.0	313.1	300.0	254.2	226.3	261.0	306.9	312.0	319.3	3,500.9
Percentage possible sunshine	90	90	81	81	80	78	64	59	72	85	92	92	80
Source 1: NOAA
Source 2: WMO (precipitation days)

== Demographics ==
Demographic evolution:

Year	Population
1988	40,000
1993	54,628
2008	78,191
2012	76,492

== Economy ==
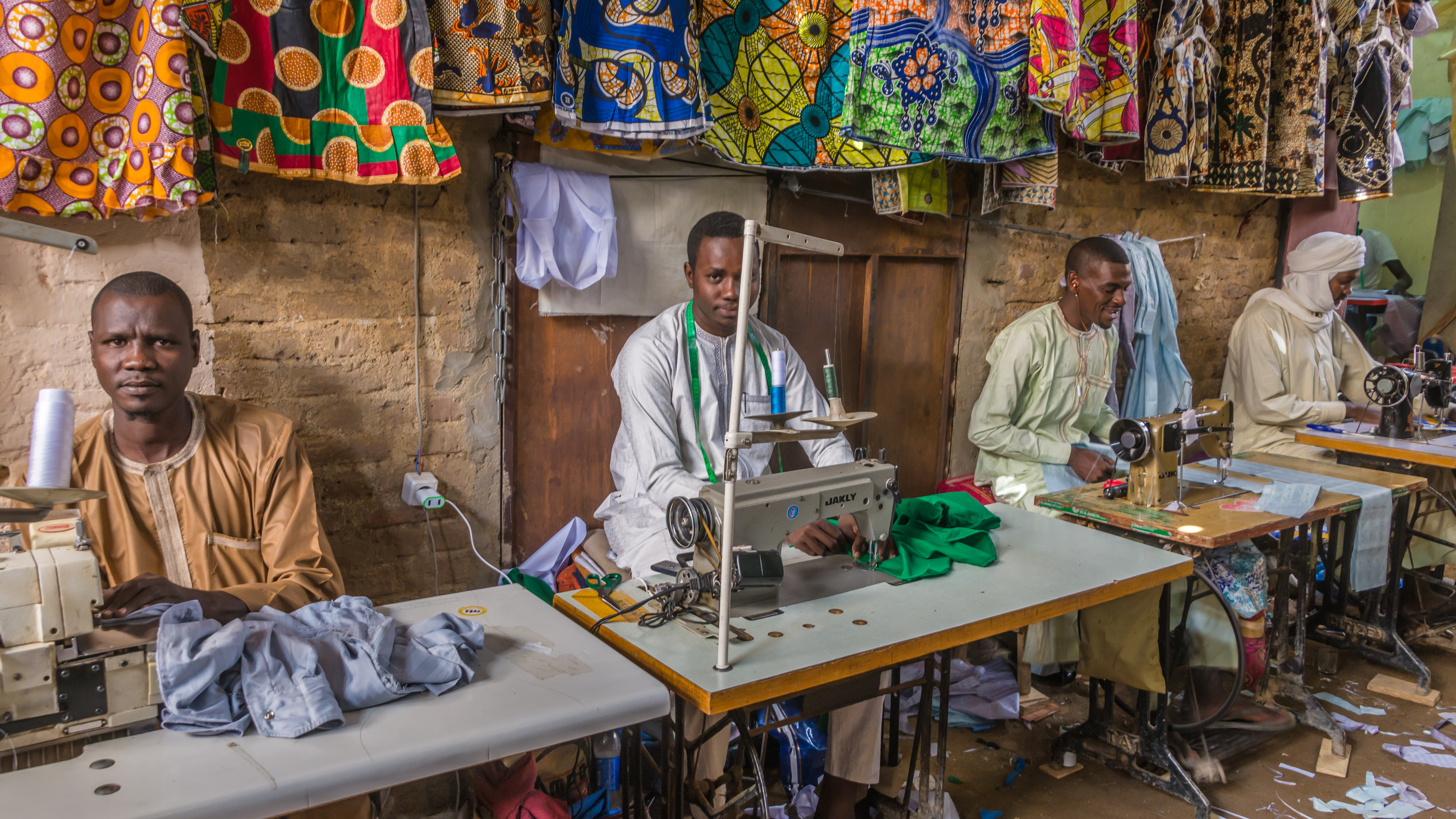
Abéché Market

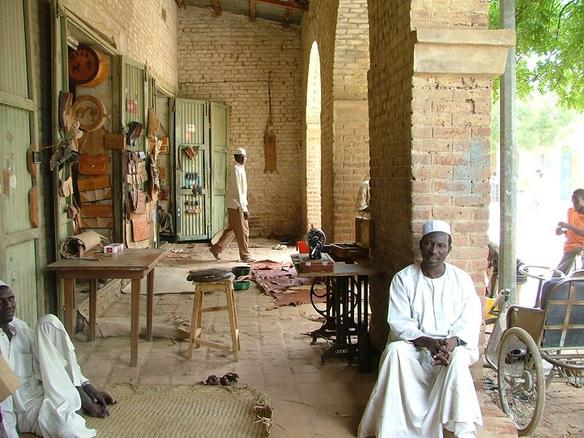
A leather shop in Abéché

The city is an important cattle raising centre. The principal camel market in the country for exports, the manufacture of camel-hair blankets is one of the industries of the area. Abéché market is a thriving regional market, also known for its vegetables and fruit stalls, with onions and lettuce sold in abundance, and spices, textiles, handmade crafts, pottery and jewelry.

== Landmarks ==
Once one of the strongholds of the Arabic slave trade route, the city is known today for its markets, mosques, church, central square (the Place de l'Indépendance), and for its sultan's palace. There are several notable Islamic structures in Abéché including the Grand Mosque on the central square, which is one of the oldest and most noteworthy mosques in the country, built in the 19th century, and the Wadi Fira Mosque, known for its minaret.

== Transportation ==
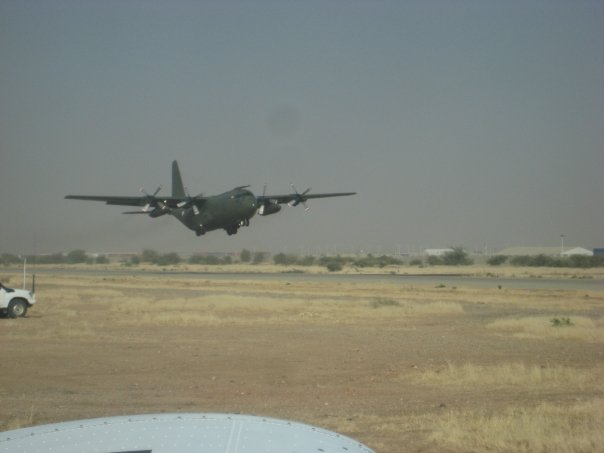
Abéché Airport

It has major roads connecting it to the capital N'Djamena, as well as Sarh, and also to neighbouring Sudan. The city is served by Abéché Airport which connects to city to N'Djamena and Faya-Largeau.

== Education ==
The Lycee Franco-Arabe school is located here.

== Notable people ==
- Youssouf Saleh Abbas (born 1953), Chadian political figure who was Prime Minister of Chad 2008 to 2010
- Mahamat Ahmat Alhabo (born 1953), politician
- Khayar Oumar Defallah (born 1944), politician, writer and actor
- Pape Diouf (1951-2020), football manager in Senegal
- Arabi El Goni (1920-1973), politician
- Mahamat Saleh Haroun (born 1961), director
- Mahamat Djarma Khatir (born 1943), politician
- Abderrahman Izzo Miskine (1952-2010), politician
- Tallafe (born 1981), artist
- Abdelkerim Souleyman Terio (born 1978), historian and writer
