= Moundou Airport =

- IATA: MQQ; ICAO: FTTD

Summary
- Airport type: Public
- Operator: Government
- Serves: Moundou, Chad
- Elevation AMSL: 1,407 ft (429 m)
- Coordinates: 08°37′27″N 016°04′17″E

Map
- Location of airport in Chad

Runways
Direction	Length		Surface
Direction	m	ft	Surface
04/22	1,800	5,906	Asphalt

Moundou Airport (IATA: MQQ, ICAO: FTTD) (Arabic: مطار ماوندو) is an airport serving Moundou, the second largest city in Chad and the capital of the region of Logone Occidental.

== Facilities ==
The airport is at an elevation of 1,407 feet (429 m) above mean sea level. It has one runway designated 04/22 with an asphalt surface measuring 1,800 by 35 metres (5,906 ft × 115 ft).
