= Sarh Airport =

- IATA: SRH; ICAO: FTTA

Summary
- Airport type: Public
- Owner: Government
- Location: Sarh, Chad
- Elevation AMSL: 1,198 ft (365 m)
- Coordinates: 9°08′46″N 18°22′33″E

Map
- Location of airport in Chad

Runways
Direction	Length		Surface
Direction	ft	m	Surface
04/22	5,806	1,800	Laterite

Sarh Airport (IATA: SRH, ICAO: FTTA) (Arabic: مطار ساره) is an airport serving Sarh, Chad. Originally entitled Fort-Archambault Airport during French colonial rule. Sarh Airport serves the city of Sarh, located in the Moyen-Chari Region of southern Chad. Situated approximately 2 kilometers northwest of the city center, it provides vital air connectivity for the region.

== History ==
Originally named Fort-Archambault Airport during French colonial rule, the airport's current designation reflects its service to Sarh, a city founded by the French in the early 20th century. Sarh was established as a settlement for returnees from labor camps associated with the construction of the Congo-Ocean Railway

== Location and Coordinates ==
- City: Sarh
- Region: Moyen-Chari
- Country: Chad
- Coordinates: Latitude 9.14479° N, Longitude 18.37472° E
- Elevation: 1,198 feet (365 meters) above sea level (metar-taf.com, mapcarta.com)

== Runway Information ==
- Runway Orientation: 04/22
- Length: 1,800 meters (5,906 feet)
- Surface: Laterite/asphalt
- Width: Approximately 40 meters (metar-taf.com, metar-taf.com, acukwik.com)

== Operations ==
Sarh Airport is open to public use and operates during daylight hours. It is not designated as an international airport, and customs and immigration services are not available on-site. The airport does not offer fueling services. Aircraft operations are subject to prior permission, and a Notice to Airmen (NOTAM) may be required. (acukwik.com)

== Nearby Airports ==
Other airports in the vicinity of Sarh include:(planemapper.com)

- Kyabé Airport (TD-0008) – approximately 69 km to the northeast
- Koumra Airport (TD-0006) – approximately 84 km to the southwest
- Goundi Airport (TD-0007) – approximately 112 km to the northwest
- Doba Airport – approximately 176 km to the south (metar-taf.com, airportprofile.com)

== Additional Information ==
- Timezone: Africa/Ndjamena (UTC+1)
- Airport Type: Public
- Airport Code: IATA: SRH, ICAO: FTTA
- Fire Category: Category 4
- Customs: Available; U.S. Customs pre-clearance is not offered (metar-taf.com, airportmap.de, acukwik.com)
