= Abéché Airport =

Abéché Airport مطار أبشي
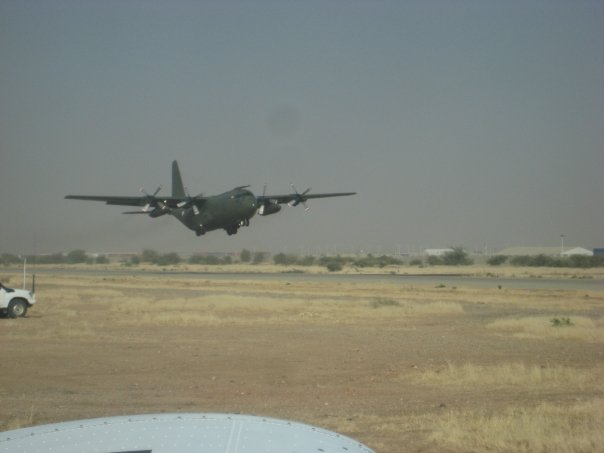
- IATA: AEH; ICAO: FTTC

Summary
- Airport type: Public
- Operator: Government
- Serves: Abéché, Chad
- Elevation AMSL: 1,788 ft / 545 m
- Coordinates: 13°50′49″N 020°50′39″E

Map
- Location of airport in Chad

Runways
Direction	Length		Surface
Direction	m	ft	Surface
09/27	2,800	9,186	Asphalt

Abéché Airport (Arabic: مطار أبشي; French: Aéroport d'Abéché; (IATA: AEH, ICAO: FTTC)) is an airport serving Abéché, the fourth largest city in Chad and the capital city of Chad's Ouaddaï Region.

== Facilities ==
The airport resides at an elevation of 1,788 feet (545 m) above mean sea level. It has one runway designated 09/27 with an asphalt surface measuring 2,800 by 30 metres (9,186 ft × 98 ft).
