= Faya-Largeau Airport =

Airport in Chad

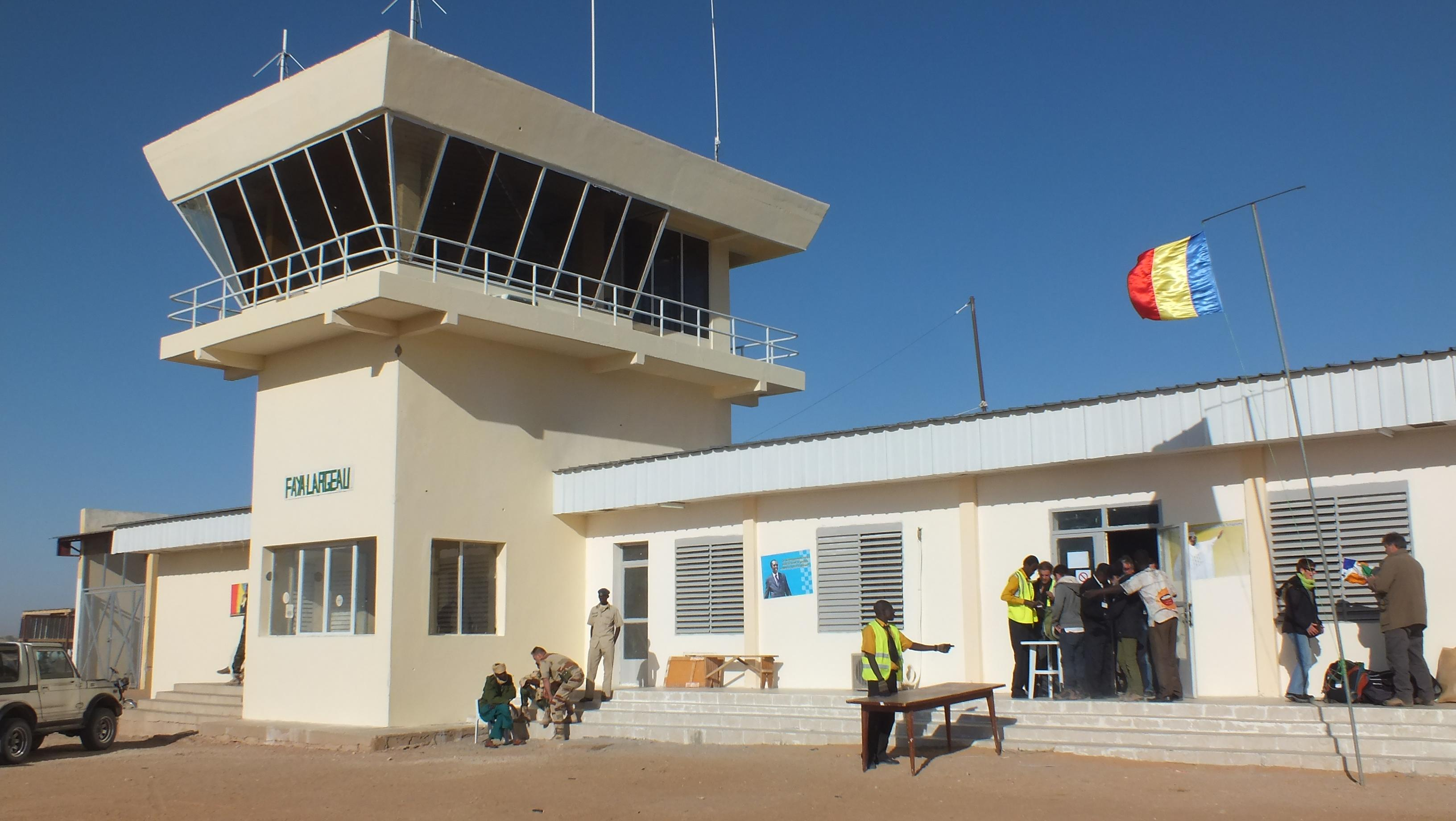
- Faya-Largeau Airport in 2013
- IATA: FYT; ICAO: FTTY

Summary
- Airport type: Public / Military
- Operator: Government
- Serves: Faya-Largeau, Chad
- Elevation AMSL: 771 ft (235 m)
- Coordinates: 17°55′01″N 019°06′39″E

Map
- Location of airport in Chad

Runways
| Direction | Length | | Surface |
| Direction | m | ft | Surface |
|---|---|---|---|
| 06/24 | 2,800 | 9,186 | Asphalt |

Faya-Largeau Airport (IATA: FYT, ICAO: FTTY) (Arabic: مطار فايا لارجو) is an airport serving Faya-Largeau, the largest city in northern Chad. It is located in Chad's Borkou Region.

Since 2013, three French Rafales are parked in Faya-Largeau to protect the Chadian airspace.

== Facilities ==
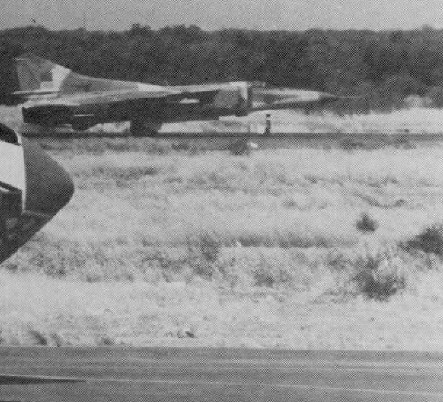
LARAF MiG-23MS with empty missile rails rolling along the runway at Faya-Largeau AB, some time in the mid-1980s. Also note the radome of an Il-76MD in the foreground left. Faya-Largeau was the main Libyan base in northern Chad until the building of Ouadi Doum.

The airport resides at an elevation of 771 feet (235 m) above mean sea level. It has one runway designated 06/24 with an asphalt surface measuring 2,800 by 45 metres (9,186 ft × 148 ft).

== Incidents ==
On 16 February 1976, a Douglas C-47A TT-LAG of the Force Aérienne Tchadienne was damaged beyond economic repair in an accident at Faya-Largeau Airport. There were no casualties.
