= Sub-prefectures of Chad =

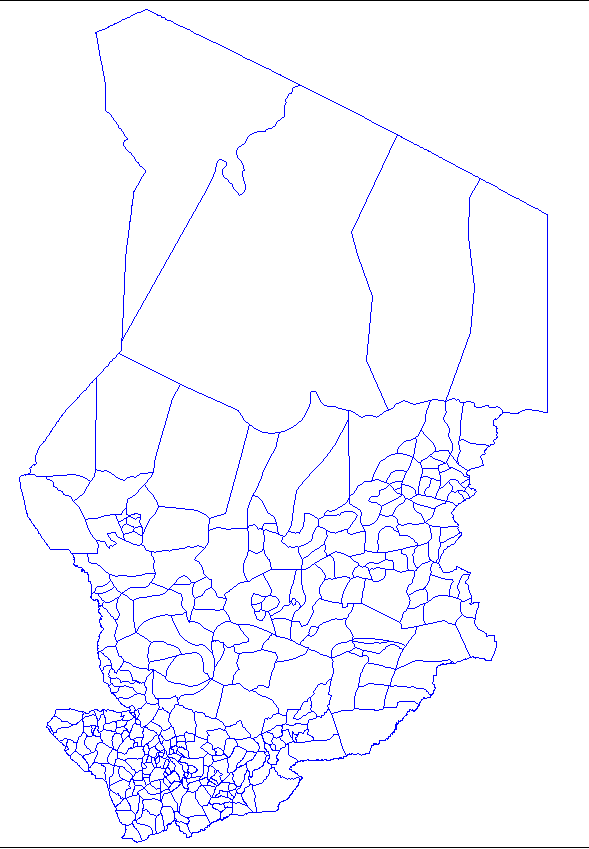
Sub-prefectures of Chad

The departments of Chad are divided into 348 sub-prefectures (sous-préfectures).

== List of sub-prefectures by department and by region ==
- The following is a list of departments grouped by region. Shown next to each department is its population as of 2009, the name of its capital or main town (chef-lieu in French), and a list of sub-prefectures (sous-préfectures).

=== Bahr El Gazel ===
Created in 2008 from the Kanem region's former Barh El Gazel department.

Department	Pop. 2009	Capital	Sub-prefectures
Bahr el Gazel Nord	64,822	Salal	Dourgoulanga, Mandjoura, Salal
Bahr El Gazel Sud	196,043	Moussoro	Amsilep, Chadra, Michemiré, Moussoro

=== Batha ===
Department	Pop. 2009	Capital	Sub-prefectures
Batha Est	188,631	Oum Hadjer	Am Sack, Assinet, Haraze Djombo Kibit, Oum Hadjer
Batha Ouest	222,243	Ati	Ati, Djédaa, Koundjourou, Hidjelidjé
Fitri	116,157	Yao	N'Djamena Bilala, Yao

=== Borkou ===
Created in 2008 from the Borkou-Ennedi-Tibesti region's former Borkou department.

Department	Pop. 2009	Capital	Sub-prefectures
Borkou	72,760	Faya-Largeau	Faya-Largeau (Faya), Kouba Olanga
Borkou Yala	24,491	Kirdimi	Kirdimi, Yarda

=== Chari-Baguirmi ===
Department	Pop. 2009	Capital	Sub-prefectures
Baguirmi	226,128	Massenya	Dourbali, Maï Aïche, Massenya
Chari	191,945	Mandélia	Koundoul, La Loumia, Linia, Lougoun, Mandélia
Loug Chari	203,712	Bousso	Bä Illi, Bogomoro, Bousso, Kouno, Mogo

=== Ennedi ===
Created in 2008 from the Borkou-Ennedi-Tibesti region's former Ennedi Est and Ennedi Ouest departments.

Department	Pop. 2009	Capital	Sub-prefectures
Ennedi	59,744	Fada	Fada, Gouro, Kalait, Ounianga, Nohi
Wadi Hawar	113,862	Amdjarass	Amdjarass, Bahaï, Bao Billiat, Kaoura, Mourdi

=== Guéra ===
Department	Pop. 2009	Capital	Sub-prefectures
Abtouyour	171,999	Bitkine	Bang Bang, Bitkine
Barh Signaka	104,812	Melfi	Chinguil, Mélfi, Mokofi
Guéra	179,609	Mongo	Baro, Mongo, Niergui
Mangalmé	97,375	Mangalmé	Bitchotchi, Eref, Kouka Margni, Mangalmé

=== Hadjer-Lamis ===
Department	Pop. 2009	Capital	Sub-prefectures
Dababa	219,686	Bokoro	Bokoro, Gama, Moïto
Dagana	188,233	Massakory	Karal, Massakory, Tourba
Haraze Al Biar	562,957	Massaguet	Mani, Massaguet, N'Djamena Fara

=== Kanem ===
Department	Pop. 2009	Capital	Sub-prefectures
Kanem	160,223	Mao	Kekedina, Mao, Melea, Wadjigui
Nord Kanem	97,868	Nokou	Nokou, Ntiona, Rig Rig, Ziguey
Wadi Bissam	96,512	Mondo	Am Doback, Mondo

=== Lac ===
Department	Pop. 2009	Capital	Sub-prefectures
Mamdi	232,242	Bol	Bagassola, Bol, Daboua, Kangalam, Liwa
Wayi	219,127	Ngouri (N'Gouri)	Doum Doum, Kouloudia, Ngouri (N'Gouri)

=== Logone Occidental ===
Department	Pop. 2009	Capital	Sub-prefectures
Dodjé	105,126	Beinamar	Béïnamar, Béïssa, Laoukassy, Tapol
Guéni	94,529	Krim Krim	Bao, Bémangra, Doguindi, Krim Krim
Lac Wey	326,496	Moundou	Bah, Déli, Dodinda, Mbalkabra, Mballa Banyo, Moundou, Ngondong
Ngourkosso	157,142	Benoye	Bébalem, Békiri, Béladjia, Benoye, Bourou, Saar Gogné

=== Logone Oriental ===
Department	Pop. 2009	Capital	Sub-prefectures
Kouh-Est	100,401	Bodo	Bédjo, Bodo, Béti
Kouh-Ouest	50,509	Béboto	Baké, Béboto, Dobiti
La Nya	139,381	Bébédjia	Bébédjia, Béboni, Komé, Mbikou, Miandoum
La Nya Pendé	111,459	Goré	Békan, Donia, Goré, Yamodo
La Pendé	169,049	Doba	Doba, Kara, Madana
Monts de Lam	225,654	Baïbokoum	Baïbokoum, Béssao, Laramanaye, Mbaïkoro, Mbitoye

=== Mandoul ===
Department	Pop. 2009	Capital	Sub-prefectures
Barh Sara	225,827	Moïssala	Béboro, Békourou, Bouna, Dembo, Moïssala
Mandoul Occidental	148,774	Bédjondo	Bébopen, Bédjondo, Békamba, Peni
Mandoul Oriental	262,485	Koumra	Bédaya, Béssada, Goundi, Koumra, Mouroum Goulaye, Ngangara

=== Mayo-Kebbi Est ===
Department	Pop. 2009	Capital	Sub-prefectures
Kabbia	216,151	Gounou Gaya	Berem, Djodo Gassa, Gounou Gaya, Pont Karwal
Mayo-Boneye	242,845	Bongor	Bongor, Gam, Kim, Koyom, Moulkou, Rigaza, Samga
Mayo-Lémié	81,816	Guélengdeng	Guélengdeng, Katoa, Nanguigoto
Mont Illi (Mont d'Illi)	228,366	Fianga	Fianga, Hollom Gamé, Kéra, Tikem, Youé

=== Mayo-Kebbi Ouest ===
Department	Pop. 2009	Capital	Sub-prefectures
Lac Léré	226,600	Léré	Binder, Guégou, Lagon, Léré
Mayo-Dallah	338,487	Pala	Gagal, Lamé, Pala, Torrock

=== Moyen-Chari ===
Department	Pop. 2009	Capital	Sub-prefectures
Barh Köh	319,087	Sarh	Balimba, Korbol, Koumogo, Moussa Foyo, Sarh
Grande Sido	105,375	Maro	Danamadji, Djéké Djéké, Maro, Sido
Lac Iro	173,822	Kyabé	Alako, Bohobé, Baltoubaye, Boum Kebbir, Dindjebo, Kyabé, Ngondeye, Roro, Singako

=== Ouaddaï ===
Department	Pop. 2009	Capital	Sub-prefectures
Abdi	114,055	Abdi	Abdi, Abkar Djombo, Biyeré
Assoungha	282,315	Adré	Adré, Borota, Hadjer Hadid, Mabrone, Molou, Tourane
Ouara	335,309	Abéché	Abéché, Abougoudam, Amleyouna, Bourtaïl, Chokoyan, Gurry, Marfa

=== Salamat ===
Department	Pop. 2009	Capital	Sub-prefectures
Aboudeïa	65,772	Aboudeïa	Abgué, Aboudeïa, Am Habilé
Barh Azoum (Barh-Azoum)	184,984	Am Timan	Am Timan, Djouna, Mouraye
Haraze-Mangueigne	57,849	Haraze	Daha, Haraze, Mangueigne

=== Sila ===
Created in 2008 from the Ouaddaï region's former Sila and Djourf Al Ahmar departments.

Department	Pop. 2009	Capital	Sub-prefectures
Djourf Al Ahmar (Djourouf Al Ahmar)	71,472	Am Dam	Am Dam, Haouich, Magrane
Kimiti	218,304	Goz Beïda	Adé, Goz Beïda, Kerfi, Koukou-Angarana, Mogororo, Moudeïna, Tissi

=== Tandjilé ===
Department	Pop. 2009	Capital	Sub-prefectures
Tandjilé Est	259,241	Laï	Deressia, Dono Manga, Guidari, Laï, N'Dam
Tandjilé Ouest	423,576	Kélo	Baktchoro, Béré, Bologo, Dafra, Delbian, Dogou, Kélo, Kolon

=== Tibesti ===
Created in 2008 from the Borkou-Ennedi-Tibesti region's former Tibesti department.

Department	Pop. 2009	Capital	Sub-prefectures
Tibesti Est	14,984	Bardaï	Aouzou, Bardaï, Yebbibou, Zoumri
Tibesti Ouest	6,986	Zouar	Goubonne, Wour, Zouar

=== Wadi Fira ===
Department	Pop. 2009	Capital	Sub-prefectures
Biltine	159,323	Biltine	Am Zoer, Arada, Biltine, Mata
Dar Tama	179,095	Guéréda	Guéréda, Kolonga, Sirim Birke
Kobé	156,515	Iriba	Iriba, Matadjana, Tiné Djagaraba

=== N'Djamena (capital) ===
N'Djamena, the capital city of Chad, is also a special statute region. It has no departments, but is divided into 10 arrondissements.

== See also ==
- Regions of Chad
- Departments of Chad
