= List of cities in Chad =

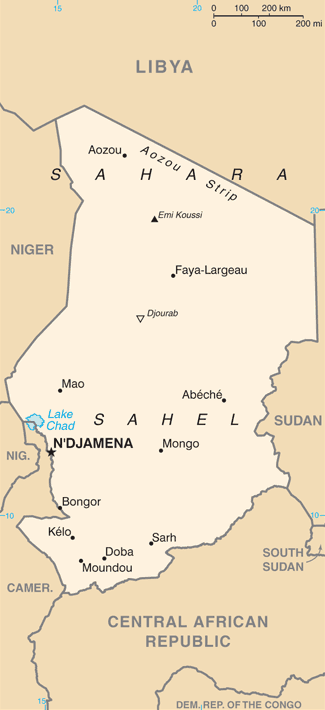
Map of Chad

This is a list of cities and towns in Chad. In brackets there is the Arabic name of the city.

== Alphabetical list ==
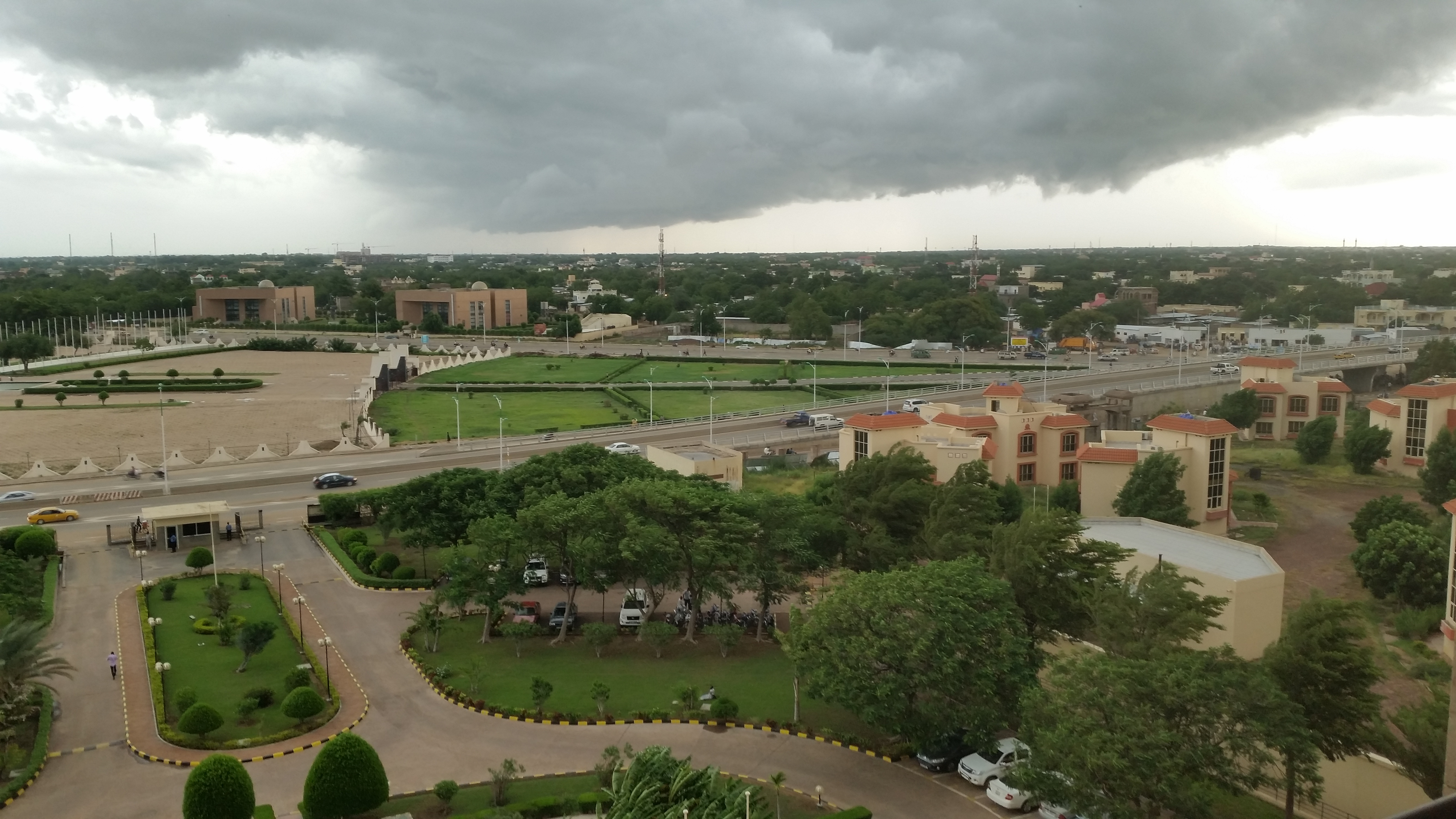
N'Djamena (انجامينا), the capital and largest city of Chad

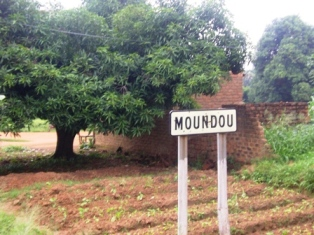
Moundou (ماوندو)

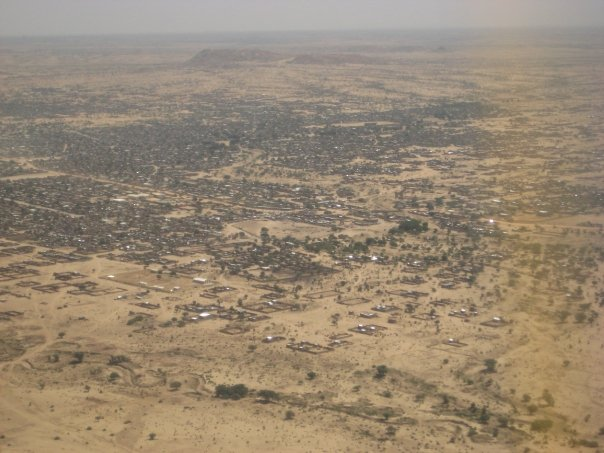
Abéché (أبشي)

- Abéché (أبشي)
- Abou-Deïa (أبو ديا)
- Adé (أدي)
- Adré (أدري)
- Am Dam (أم دام)
- Amdjarass (أم جرس)
- Am Timan (أم تيمان)
- Aouzou (أوزو)
- Arada (أردا)
- Ati (أتي)
- Baïbokoum (بيبوكمم)
- Bardaï (برداي)
- Bébédjia (بيبيدخيا)
- Béboto (بيبوتو)
- Beinamar (بينامار)
- Bénoye (بينوي)
- Béré (بيري)
- Biltine (بلتن)
- Bitkine (نيتكتن)
- Bokoro (بوكورو)
- Bol (بول)
- Bongor (بونقور)
- Bousso (بوسو)
- Djédaa (جيدا)
- Doba (دوبا)
- Dourbali (دوربالي)
- Fada (فادا)
- Faya-Largeau (فايا لارجو)
- Fianga (فيانكا)
- Gaoui (غاوي)
- Goré (غوري)
- Goundi (غوندي)
- Gounou Gaya (غونو غايا)
- Goz Beïda (قوز بيدا)
- Guélengdeng (جليندينغ)
- Guéréda (غيريدا)
- Haraze (حراز)
- Ifenat (إفينات)
- Iriba (هريبا)
- Kélo (كيلو)
- Koro Toro (كورو تورو)
- Koumra (قمرة)
- Kyabé (كيابي)
- Laï (لادي)
- Léré (ليري)
- Linia (لينيا)
- Mangalmé (مانقالمي)
- Mao (ماو)
- Massaguet (مساقط)
- Massakory (ماساكوري)
- Massenya (ماسينيا)
- Melfi (ملفي)
- Moïssala (مويسالا)
- Moundou (ماوندو)
- Mongo (مونقو)
- Moussoro (موسورو)
- N'Djamena (انجامينا)
- Ngama (نجمة)
- Ouara (وارا)
- Oum Hadjer (أم هاجر)
- Pala (بالا)
- Sarh (ساره)
- Zouar (زوار)

== Largest cities ==
Given below is a list of the largest cities in Chad along with their respective populations.

Note: Population figures vary from source to source.

1. N'Djamena — انْجَمِينا) 1,605,696)
2. Moundou — 137,929 (موندو)
3. Sarh — 137,251 (ساره)
4. Abéché — 97,963 (أبشي)
5. Kélo — 57,859 (كيلو)
6. Koumra — 37,867 (قمرة)
7. Pala — 49,461 (بالا)
8. Am Timan — 52,270 (أم تيمان)
9. Mongo — 40,233 (مونقو)
10. Bongor — 30,518 (بونقور)

#	City name	Arabic name	Population (2012 est.)	Population (2009)	Province
1	N'Djamena	انْجَمِينا	1,605,696	951,418	N'Djamena
2	Moundou	موندو	137,929	137,251	Logone Occidental
3	Sarh	ساره	103,269	97,224	Moyen-Chari
4	Abéché	أبشي	76,492	97,963	Ouaddaï
5	Faya-Largeau	فايا لارجو	48,090	30,800	Borkou
6	Koumra	قمرة	47,950	37,867	Mandoul
7	Kélo	كيلو	45,224	57,859	Tandjilé
8	Mongo	مونقو	40,223	37,628	Guéra
9	Pala	بالا	40,202	49,461	Mayo-Kebbi Ouest
10	Am Timan	أم تيمان	38,261	52,270	Salamat
11	Ati	أتي	35,311	20,902	Batha
12	Bongor	بونقور	35,296	44,578	Mayo-Kebbi Est
13	Doba	دوبا	35,201	49,647	Logone Oriental
14	Mao	ماو	32,798	35,468	Kanem
15	Oum Hadjer	أم هاجر	28,266	26,552	Batha
16	Moussoro	موسورو	27,630	24,564	Barh el Gazel
17	Bitkine	نيتكتن	26,803	29,302	Guéra
18	Biltine	بلتن	25,170	23,472	Wadi Fira
19	Massaguet	مساقط	24,764	19,876	Hadjer-Lamis
20	Dourbali	دوربالي	24,454	-	Chari-Baguirmi
21	Laï	لادي	22,667	18,945	Tandjilé
22	Léré	ليري	21,775	22,899	Mayo-Kebbi Ouest
23	Kyabé	كيابي	21,391	15,960	Moyen-Chari
24	Massakory	ماساكوري	21,307	27,954	Hadjer-Lamis
25	Bokoro	بوكورو	20,362	18,262	Hadjer-Lamis
26	Bousso	بوسو	18,747	11,710	Chari-Baguirmi
27	Bénoye	بينوي	18,381	12,097	Logone Occidental
28	Bébédjia	بيبيدخيا	18,327	28,195	Logone Oriental
29	Adré	أدري	18,054	15,361	Ouaddaï
30	Ngama	نجمة	17,203	-	Hadjer-Lamis
31	Béré	بيري	17,151	-	Tandjilé
32	Fianga	فيانكا	17,083	22,162	Mayo-Kebbi Est
33	Bol	بول	15,058	35,963	Lac
34	Moïssala	مويسالا	14,894	12,094	Mandoul
35	Guélengdeng	جليندينغ	14,463	16,320	Mayo-Kebbi Est

== See also ==
- List of cities by country
- Subdivisions of Chad
