= Demographics of Chad =

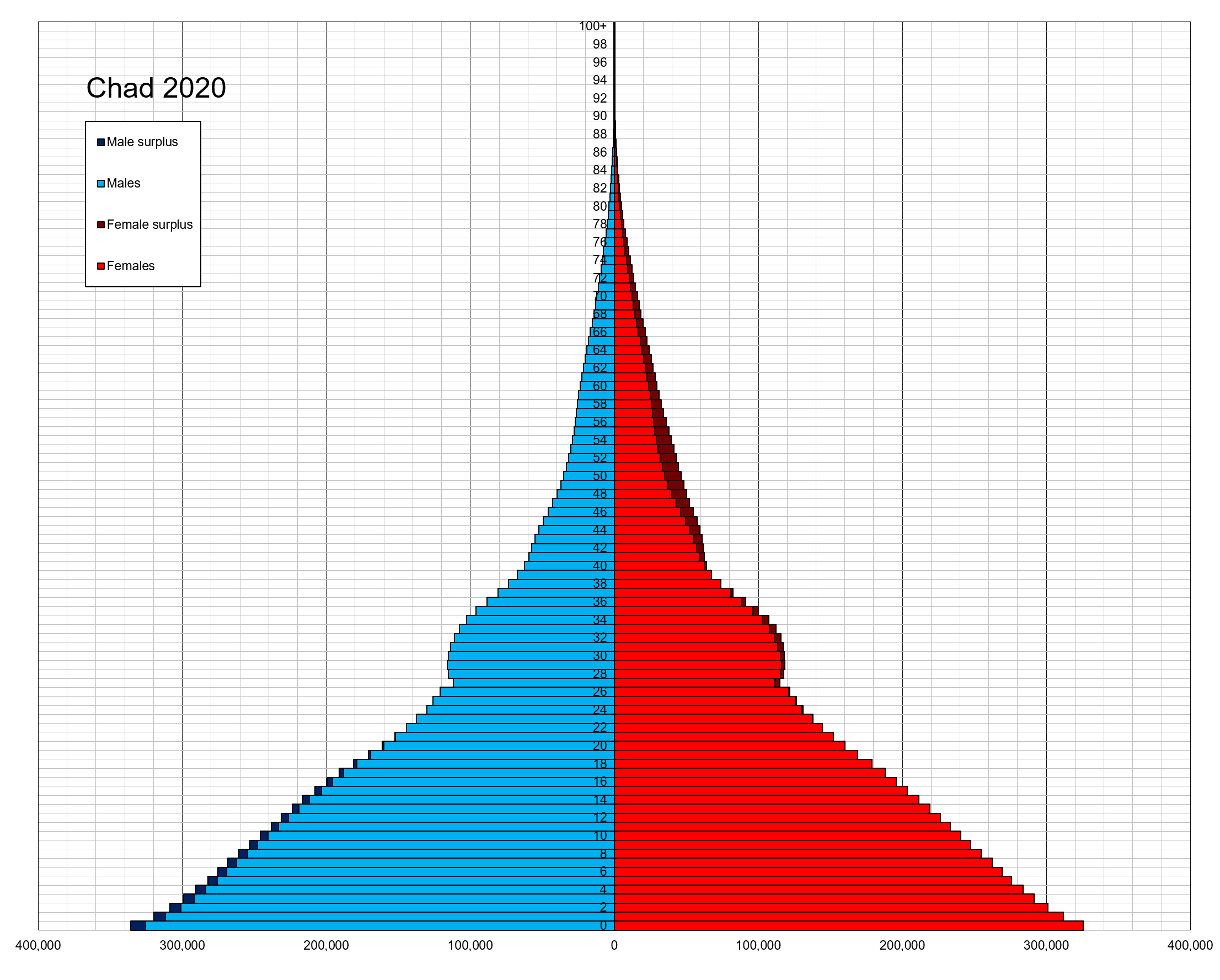
- Population pyramid of Chad in 2020
- Population: 17,963,211 (2022 est.)
- Growth rate: 3.09% (2022 est.)
- Birth rate: 40.45 births/1,000 population (2022 est.)
- Death rate: 9.45 deaths/1,000 population (2022 est.)
- Life expectancy: 53.00 years
  - male: 51.30 years
  - female: 54.77 years
- Fertility rate: 5.46 children born/woman (2022 est.)
- Infant mortality: 65.48 deaths/1,000 live births
- Net migration rate: -0.13 migrant(s)/1,000 population (2022 est.)

Age structure
- 0–14 years: 47.43%
- 65 and over: 2.43%

Sex ratio
- Total: 0.98 male(s)/female (2022 est.)
- At birth: 1.04 male(s)/female
- Under 15: 1.02 male(s)/female
- 65 and over: 0.69 male(s)/female

Nationality
- Nationality: Chadian

Language
- Official: French, Arabic

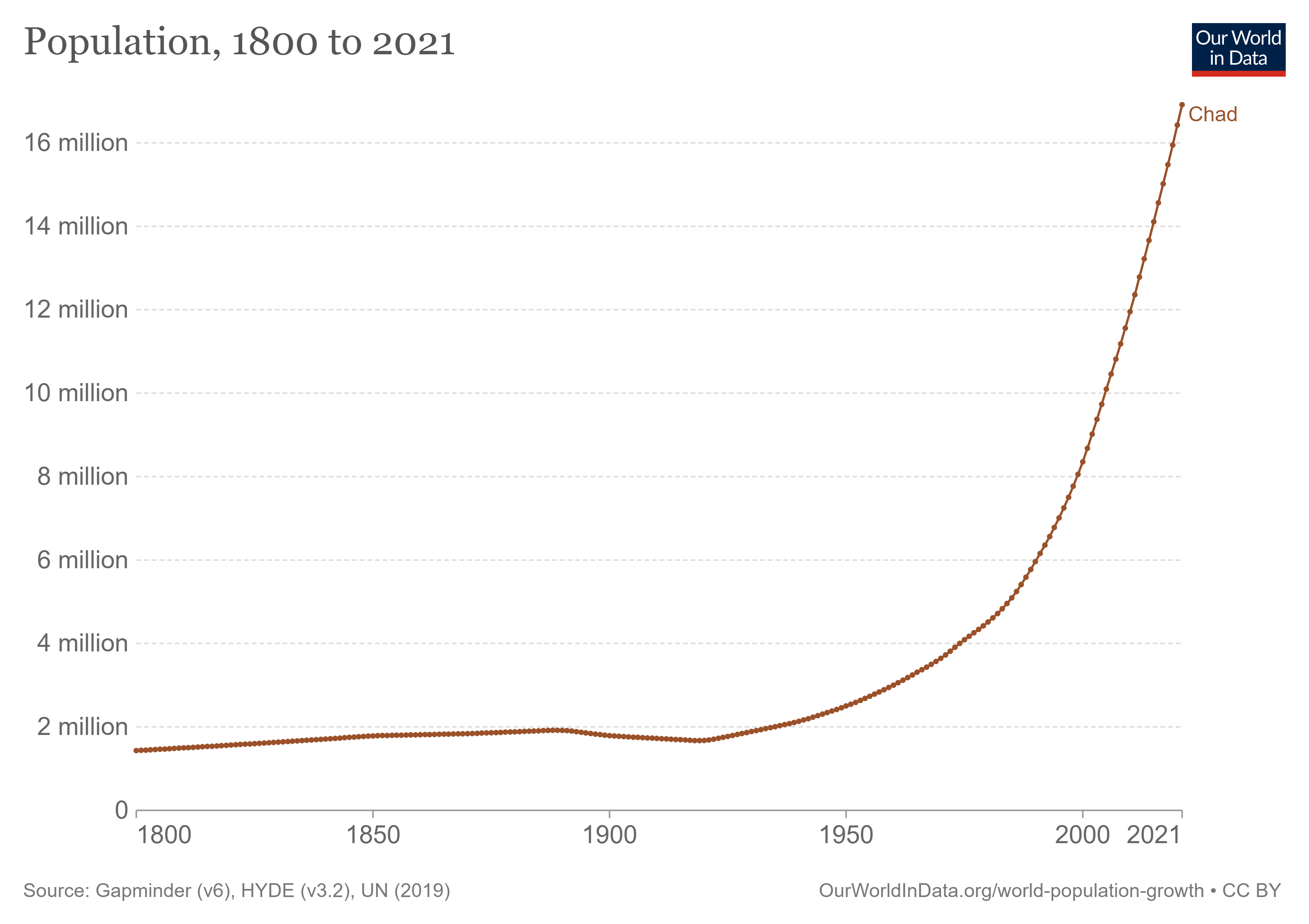
Demographics of Chad, Data of Our World in Data, year 2022; Number of inhabitants in millions.

The people of Chad speak more than 100 languages and divide themselves into many ethnic groups. However, language and ethnicity are not the same. Moreover, neither element can be tied to a particular physical type.

Although the possession of a common language shows that its speakers have lived together and have a common history, peoples also change languages. This is particularly so in Chad, where the openness of the terrain, marginal rainfall, frequent drought and famine, and low population densities have encouraged physical and linguistic mobility. Slave raids among non-Muslim peoples, internal slave trade, and exports of captives northward from the ninth to the twentieth centuries also have resulted in language changes.

The Chadian government has avoided official recognition of ethnicity. With the exception of a few surveys conducted shortly after independence, little data were available on this important aspect of Chadian society. Nonetheless, ethnic identity was a significant component of life in Chad.

The peoples of Chad carry significant ancestry from Eastern, Central, Western, and Northern Africa.

Chad's languages fall into ten major groups, each of which belongs to either the Nilo-Saharan, Afro-Asiatic, or Niger–Congo language family. These represent three of the four major language families in Africa; only the Khoisan languages of southern Africa are not represented. The presence of such different languages suggests that the Lake Chad Basin may have been an important point of dispersal in ancient times.

== Population ==
According to the 2022 revision of the World Population Prospects the total population was 17,179,740 in 2021, compared to only 2 429 000 in 1950. The proportion of children below the age of 15 in 2010 was 45.4%, 51.7% was between 15 and 65 years of age, while 2.9% was 65 years or older. The country is projected to have a population of 34 million people in 2050 and 61 million people in 2100 .

Year	Total population	Population percentage in age bracket		
Year	Total population	aged 0–14	aged 15–64	aged 65+
1950	2 429 000	37.8%	57.8%	4.4%
1955	2 671 000	39.1%	56.8%	4.1%
1960	2 954 000	40.3%	55.9%	3.8%
1965	3 289 000	41.5%	54.7%	3.8%
1970	3 656 000	42.0%	54.2%	3.8%
1975	4 114 000	42.8%	53.4%	3.8%
1980	4 554 000	44.0%	52.3%	3.7%
1985	5 151 000	45.2%	51.2%	3.6%
1990	6 011 000	45.8%	50.7%	3.5%
1995	6 998 000	45.9%	50.8%	3.3%
2000	8 222 000	45.9%	51.0%	3.1%
2005	9 786 000	45.8%	51.2%	3.0%
2010	11 227 000	45.4%	51.7%	2.9%

Population by Sex and Age Group (Census 20.V.2009):

Age group	Male	Female	Total	%
Total	5 452 483	5 587 390	11 039 873	100
0–4	1 129 693	1 100 985	2 230 678	20.21
5–9	1 012 471	987 297	1 999 768	18.11
10–14	700 015	650 633	1 350 648	12.23
15–19	502 894	557 494	1 060 388	9.61
20–24	382 122	482 768	864 890	7.83
25–29	320 063	433 622	753 685	6.83
30–34	277 322	335 402	612 724	5.55
35–39	241 971	260 515	502 485	4.55
40–44	215 887	214 181	430 068	3.90
45–49	163 952	139 357	303 308	2.75
50–54	147 725	133 019	280 744	2.54
55–59	84 938	62 817	147 755	1.34
60–64	92 696	85 024	177 720	1.61
65–69	48 054	37 398	85 452	0.77
70–74	56 059	49 289	105 348	0.95
75–79	24 148	17 371	41 518	0.38
80–84	24 947	21 486	46 433	0.42
85–89	9 086	5 833	14 919	0.14
90–94	6 852	5 465	12 317	0.11
95–99	5 113	3 609	8 722	0.08
100+	1 323	1 200	2 523	0.02
Age group	Male	Female	Total	Percent
0–14	2 842 179	2 738 915	5 581 094	50.55
15–64	2 429 569	2 704 199	5 133 768	46.50
65+	175 582	141 651	317 233	2.87
Unknown	5 153	2 625	7 778	0.07

== Vital statistics ==
Registration of vital events is in Chad not complete. The Population Department of the United Nations prepared the following estimates.

	Population	Live births per year	Deaths per year	Natural change per year	CBR (Note: CBR = crude birth rate (per 1000); CDR = crude death rate (per 1000); NC = natural change (per 1000); TFR = total fertility rate (number of children per woman); IMR = infant mortality rate per 1000 births)	CDR	NC	TFR	IMR	Life expectancy (years)
1950		117,000	70,000	47,000	46.7	27.8	18.9	6.06	197.6	36.21
1951		119,000	72,000	47,000	46.5	28.1	18.4	6.07	196.5	36.34
1952		121,000	73,000	48,000	46.4	28.1	18.3	6.09	194.4	36.50
1953		123,000	74,000	49,000	46.4	27.9	18.5	6.11	192.3	36.84
1954		125,000	75,000	50,000	46.3	27.7	18.5	6.13	190.3	37.03
1955		127,000	76,000	51,000	46.2	27.6	18.6	6.15	188.3	37.21
1956		130,000	77,000	53,000	46.1	27.3	18.8	6.17	186.3	37.45
1957		132,000	78,000	54,000	46.0	27.1	18.9	6.19	184.3	37.66
1958		134,000	78,000	56,000	45.9	26.8	19.1	6.21	182.3	37.94
1959		136,000	79,000	57,000	45.9	26.5	19.3	6.23	180.3	38.19
1960		139,000	80,000	59,000	45.7	26.3	19.4	6.25	178.4	38.37
1961		141,000	80,000	61,000	45.7	26.0	19.6	6.27	176.5	38.63
1962		144,000	81,000	62,000	45.6	25.8	19.8	6.29	174.6	38.84
1963		146,000	82,000	64,000	45.5	25.6	19.9	6.30	172.8	39.07
1964		149,000	83,000	66,000	45.4	25.3	20.2	6.32	171.0	39.33
1965		152,000	85,000	67,000	45.4	25.4	20.0	6.34	169.7	39.12
1966		155,000	86,000	69,000	45.4	25.3	20.2	6.36	166.8	39.15
1967		158,000	87,000	71,000	45.6	25.0	20.6	6.39	164.2	39.48
1968		162,000	87,000	75,000	45.8	24.6	21.2	6.43	161.3	39.90
1969		166,000	88,000	79,000	46.2	24.3	21.9	6.48	158.3	40.27
1970		172,000	88,000	83,000	46.7	24.1	22.6	6.53	155.2	40.60
1971		177,000	92,000	85,000	47.2	24.4	22.7	6.58	153.5	40.19
1972		188,000	90,000	97,000	49.0	23.6	25.4	6.85	149.1	41.40
1973		192,000	92,000	100,000	49.0	23.5	25.5	6.87	148.7	41.78
1974		196,000	94,000	102,000	48.8	23.5	25.4	6.86	147.8	41.79
1975		200,000	96,000	104,000	48.7	23.4	25.4	6.88	147.0	41.87
1976		203,000	97,000	107,000	48.6	23.1	25.5	6.89	145.5	42.04
1977		206,000	98,000	109,000	48.4	22.9	25.5	6.90	144.6	42.26
1978		209,000	98,000	111,000	48.2	22.7	25.5	6.89	143.6	42.50
1979		212,000	99,000	113,000	48.1	22.4	25.7	6.91	142.6	42.81
1980		218,000	100,000	118,000	48.2	22.1	26.1	6.91	141.4	43.06
1981		205,000	97,000	108,000	46.3	21.9	24.5	6.94	141.0	43.31
1982		212,000	97,000	115,000	46.9	21.4	25.5	6.96	139.5	43.73
1983		242,000	102,000	140,000	49.8	21.1	28.8	6.98	138.0	44.18
1984		252,000	105,000	147,000	50.4	21.0	29.4	7.02	136.2	44.52
1985		245,000	103,000	142,000	49.3	20.7	28.5	7.04	135.0	45.05
1986		252,000	104,000	148,000	49.4	20.4	28.9	7.07	132.1	45.21
1987		268,000	116,000	153,000	50.7	21.8	28.8	7.11	130.4	42.80
1988		283,000	110,000	173,000	51.7	20.2	31.5	7.15	128.9	45.79
1989		295,000	114,000	182,000	52.1	20.1	32.0	7.19	127.0	45.88
1990		307,000	121,000	185,000	52.4	20.7	31.6	7.22	125.3	44.69
1991		312,000	120,000	192,000	52.1	20.0	32.0	7.26	124.2	45.94
1992		336,000	125,000	211,000	53.3	19.9	33.4	7.30	122.5	46.10
1993		349,000	129,000	221,000	53.5	19.7	33.8	7.34	120.9	46.32
1994		343,000	129,000	214,000	52.1	19.5	32.5	7.31	119.6	46.45
1995		355,000	131,000	224,000	52.1	19.2	32.9	7.29	118.2	46.71
1996		381,000	136,000	245,000	53.0	18.9	34.0	7.29	117.0	47.01
1997		390,000	139,000	251,000	52.4	18.7	33.7	7.27	115.6	47.22
1998		403,000	143,000	260,000	52.2	18.5	33.7	7.27	114.0	47.22
1999		413,000	146,000	267,000	51.7	18.3	33.4	7.26	112.4	47.37
2000		424,000	149,000	275,000	51.3	18.1	33.2	7.25	110.7	47.44
2001		436,000	151,000	285,000	51.1	17.7	33.4	7.23	108.8	47.85
2002		444,000	154,000	290,000	50.3	17.4	32.9	7.20	106.8	47.95
2003		457,000	157,000	300,000	49.9	17.1	32.8	7.18	105.1	48.21
2004		481,000	162,000	318,000	50.3	17.0	33.3	7.16	103.4	48.23
2005		503,000	168,000	335,000	50.3	16.8	33.5	7.13	101.5	48.31
2006		517,000	173,000	344,000	49.9	16.7	33.2	7.12	99.7	48.29
2007		533,000	175,000	359,000	49.7	16.3	33.4	7.09	97.5	48.75
2008		546,000	177,000	368,000	49.2	16.0	33.2	7.06	95.4	49.02
2009		562,000	181,000	381,000	48.9	15.8	33.2	7.02	93.2	49.20
2010		580,000	183,000	397,000	48.8	15.4	33.3	6.99	91.1	49.58
2011		595,000	185,000	410,000	48.4	15.1	33.3	6.95	88.9	50.01
2012		612,000	187,000	426,000	48.0	14.6	33.4	6.91	86.6	50.54
2013		626,000	190,000	437,000	47.5	14.4	33.1	6.84	84.5	50.78
2014		643,000	192,000	451,000	47.0	14.0	33.0	6.78	82.6	51.20
2015		657,000	194,000	463,000	46.4	13.7	32.7	6.71	80.6	51.59
2016		663,000	194,000	469,000	45.5	13.3	32.2	6.62	78.5	52.08
2017		676,000	197,000	479,000	44.8	13.0	31.8	6.54	76.3	52.31
2018		691,000	197,000	494,000	44.4	12.7	31.7	6.46	74.2	52.83
2019		714,000	200,000	514,000	44.2	12.4	31.9	6.41	72.2	53.26
2020	16,936	754,000	212,000	541,000	43.8	12.3	31.4	6.35	70.1	53.1
2021	17,514	772,000	217,000	555,000	43.3	12.2	31.1	6.25	68.1	53.1
2022	18,143	800,000	212,000	588,000	43.4	11.5	31.9	6.22	66.1	54.5
2023	18,768	819,000	213,000	606,000	42.4	11.0	31.4	6.12	64.2	55.1
2024					43.3	11.1	32.2	6.03		
2025					43.2	11.1	32.1	5.94		

Source: UN DESA, World Population Prospects, 2022

View source data.
View source data.
View source data.

=== Fertility ===
Total Fertility Rate (TFR) (Wanted Fertility Rate) and Crude Birth Rate (CBR):

Year	Total		Urban		Rural	
Year	CBR	TFR	CBR	TFR	CBR	TFR
1996–97	47,8	6,6 (6,3)	44,4	6,1 (5,7)	48,8	6,8 (6,5)
2004	44,6	6,3 (6,1)	41,8	5,7 (5,5)	45,3	6,5 (6,2)
2014–15	40,5	6,4 (6,1)	36,0	5,4 (5,1)	41,8	6,8 (6,5)

Fertility data as of 2014-2015 (DHS Program):

Region	Total fertility rate	Percentage of women age 15-49 currently pregnant	Mean number of children ever born to women age 40–49
Batha	7.3	12.2	8.3
Borkou, Tibesti	5.3	9.6	6.4
Chari Baguirmi	6.6	16.1	7.7
Guéra	6.7	14.6	8.4
Hadjer-Lamis	6.8	14.5	8.4
Kanem	6.0	14.8	7.1
Lac	5.4	14.7	7.9
Logone Occidental	6.4	12.7	7.6
Logone Oriental	7.6	12.7	8.3
Mandoul	6.5	12.7	7.7
Mayo Kebbi Est	6.7	15.0	7.3
Mayo Kebbi Ouest	7.5	13.8	7.9
Moyen Chari	5.5	12.6	6.8
Ouaddaï	6.1	13.1	7.1
Salamat	6.5	19.7	8.0
Tandjilé	7.1	13.1	8.0
Wadi Fira	5.9	12.2	6.5
N’Djaména	5.2	9.4	6.5
Barh El Gazal	5.6	14.5	7.1
Ennedi Est, Ennedi Ouest	5.0	13.4	6.3
Sila	6.7	19.6	7.7

Years	1925	1926	1927	1928	1929	1930	1931	1932	1933	1934
Total Fertility Rate in Chad	6.06	6.06	6.06	6.06	6.06	6.06	6.06	6.06	6.06	6.06

Years	1935	1936	1937	1938	1939	1940	1941	1942	1943	1944
Total Fertility Rate in Chad	6.06	6.06	6.06	6.06	6.06	6.06	6.06	6.06	6.06	6.06

Years	1945	1946	1947	1948	1949
Total Fertility Rate in Chad	6.06	6.06	6.06	6.06	6.06

== Ethnic groups ==
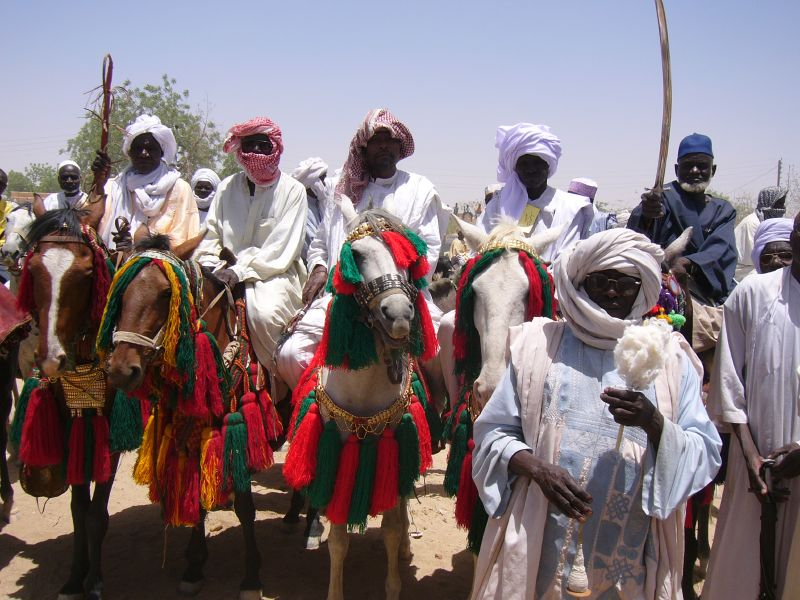
A tribal delegation in Chad

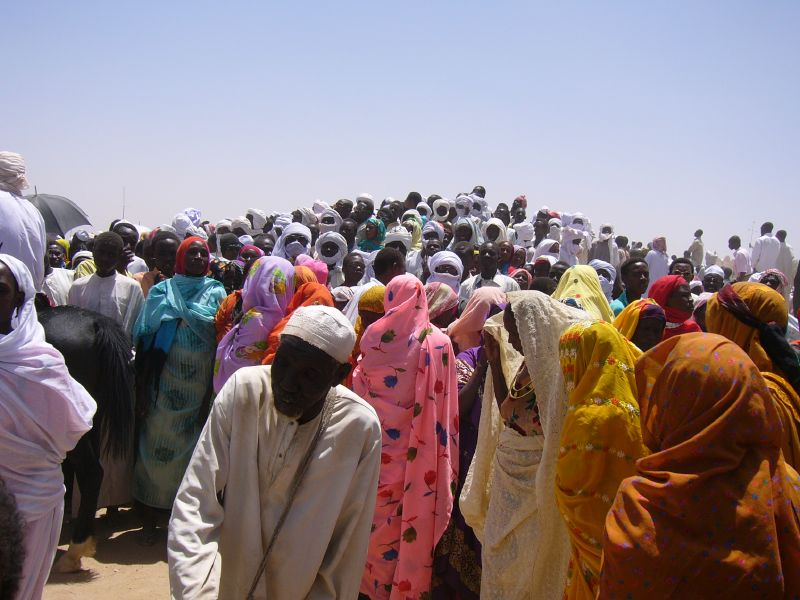
People of Chad

The peoples of Chad carry significant ancestry from Eastern, Central, Western, and Northern Africa.

200 distinct groups

- In the north and center: Arabs, Tubu (Daza, Teda), Zaghawa, Kanembu, Wadai, Baguirmi, Hadjarai, Fulani, Kotoko, Hausa, Bulala, and Maba, most of whom are Muslim
- In the south: Sara (Ngambaye, Mbaye, Goulaye), Mundang, Mussei, Massa, most of whom are Christian or animist

== Languages ==
Arabic (official), French (official), Sara (in south), more than 120 languages and dialects

== Religion ==
The separation of religion from social structure in Chad represents a false dichotomy, for they are perceived as two sides of the same coin. Three religious traditions coexist in Chad: traditional African religions, Islam, and Christianity. None is monolithic. The first tradition includes a variety of ancestor and/or place-oriented religions whose expression is highly specific. Islam, although characterized by an orthodox set of beliefs and observances, also is expressed in diverse ways. Christianity arrived in Chad much more recently with the arrival of Europeans. Its followers are divided into Roman Catholics and Protestants (including several denominations); as with Chadian Islam, Chadian Christianity retains aspects of pre-Christian religious belief.

The number of followers of each tradition in Chad is unknown. Estimates made in 1962 suggested that 35 percent of Chadians practiced classical African religions, 55 percent were Muslims, and 10 percent were Christians. In the 1970s and 1980s, this distribution undoubtedly changed. Observers report that Islam has spread among the Hadjarai peoples and other non-Muslim populations of the Saharan and sahelian zones. However, the proportion of Muslims may have fallen, because the birthrate among the followers of traditional religions and Christians in southern Chad is thought to be higher than that among Muslims. In addition, the upheavals since the mid-1970s have resulted in the departure of some missionaries; whether or not Chadian Christians have been numerous enough and sufficiently organized to attract more converts since that time is unknown.
