= List of provinces of Chad by Human Development Index =

This is a list of provinces of Chad by Human Development Index as of 2025 with data for the year 2023.

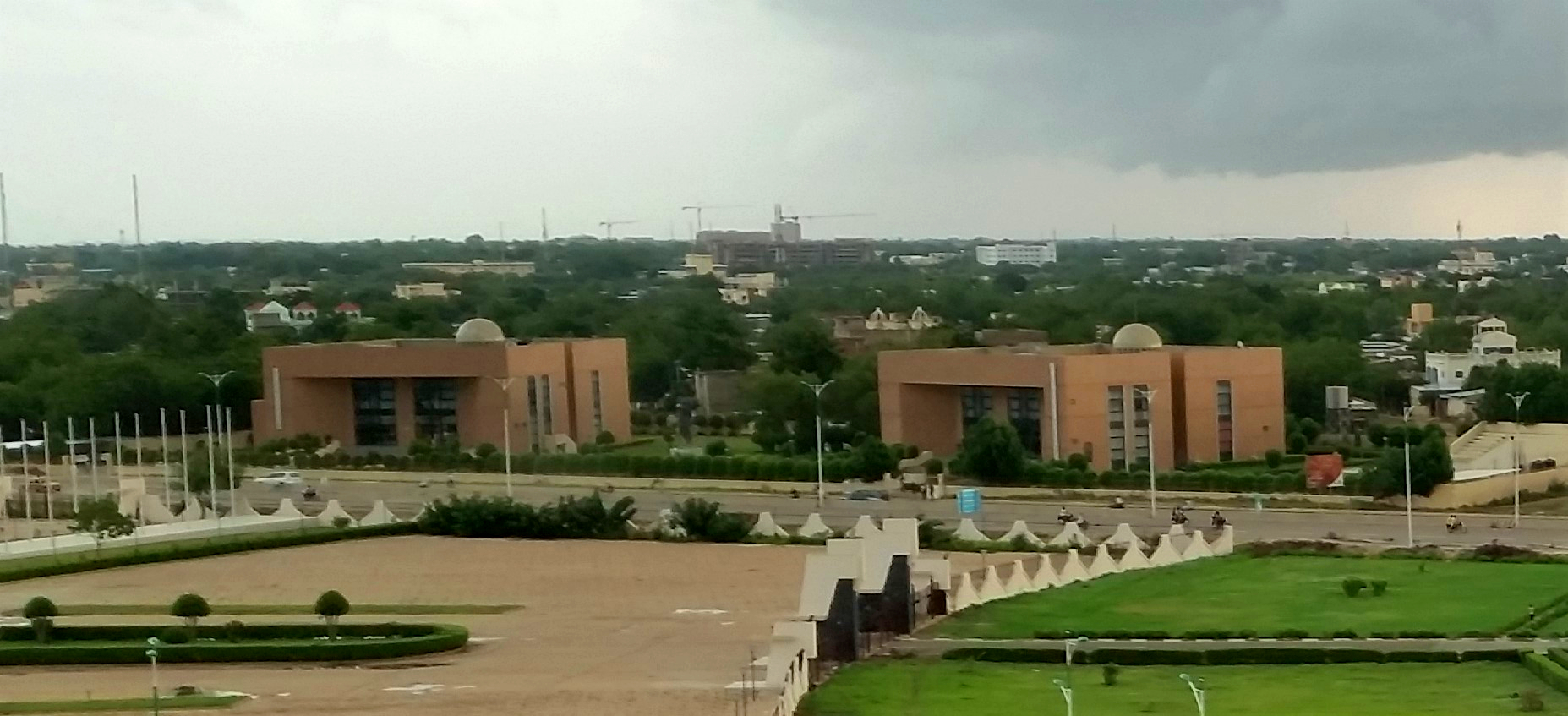
N'Djamena, the capital of Chad, and the most developed region.

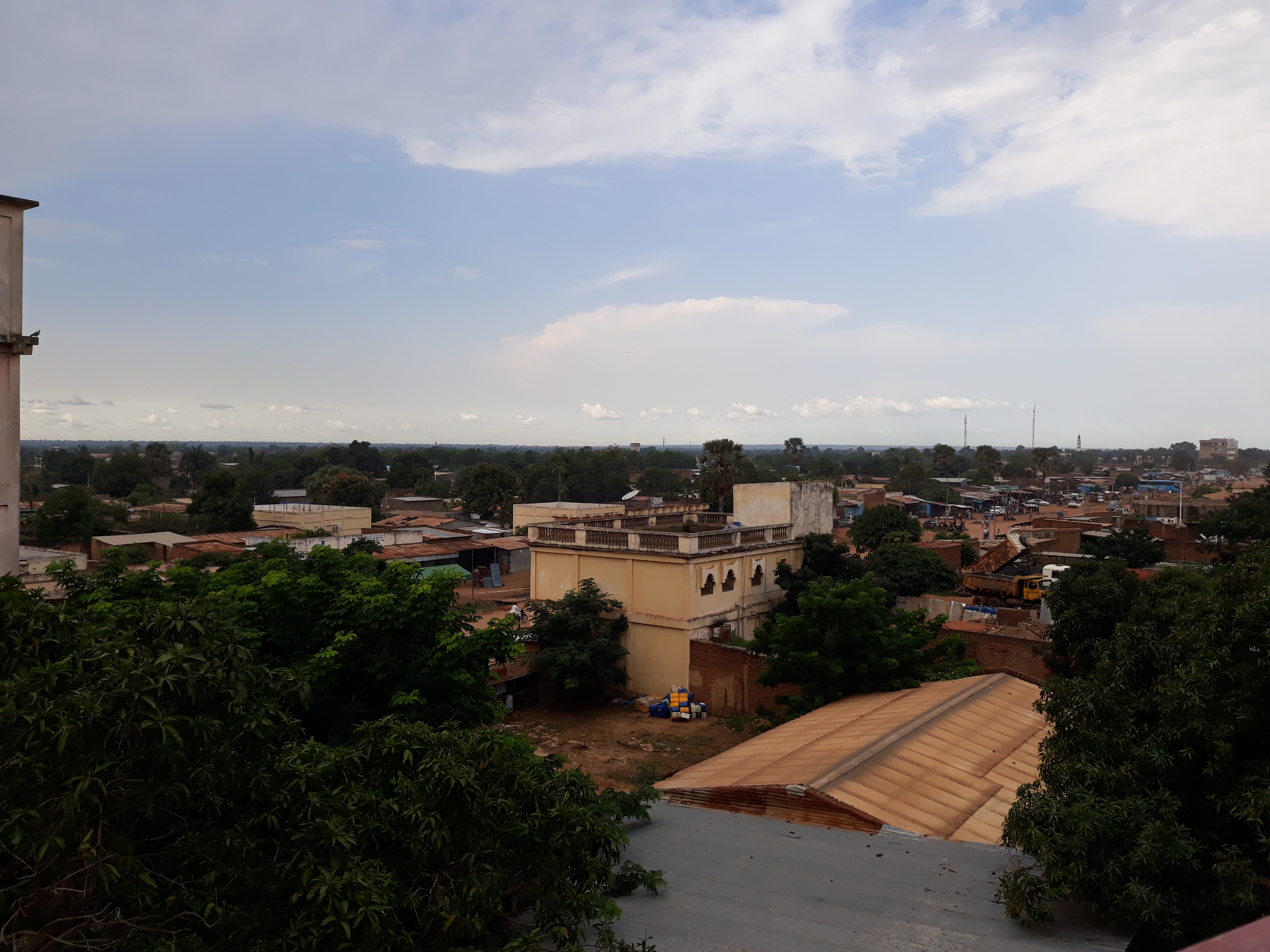
Moundou, the second largest city of Chad.

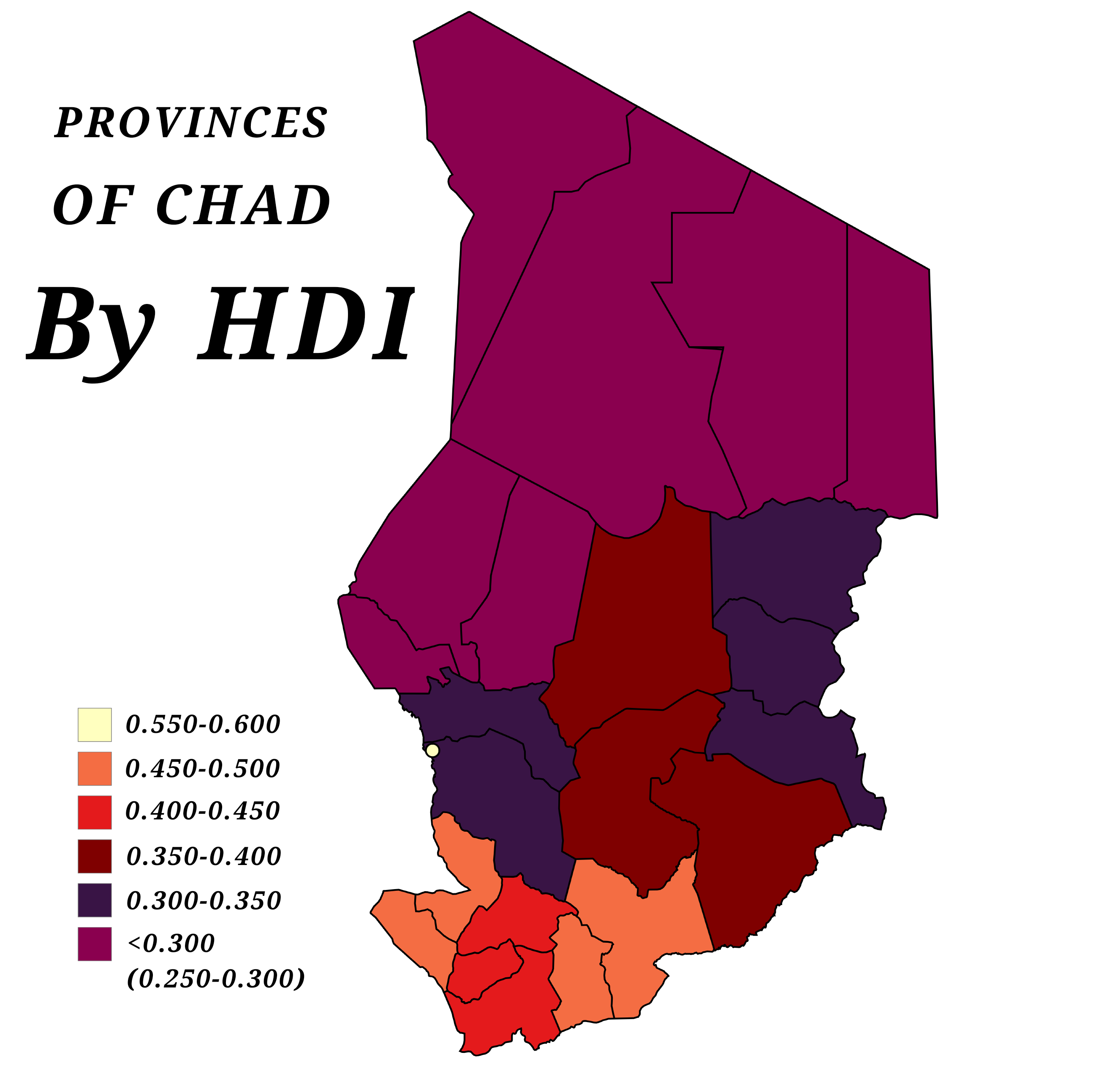
Map showing the Human Development Index (HDI) of the 23 provinces of Chad.

Rank	Region	HDI (2023)
Medium human development
1	Zone 1 (N'Djamena)	0.558
Low human development
2	Zone 6 (Mayo-Kebbi Est, Mayo-Kebbi Ouest)	0.484
3	Zone 8 (Mandoul, Moyen-Chari, Barh Koh, Lac Iro)	0.458
4	Zone 7 (Logone Oriental, Logone Occidental, Monts de Lam, Tandjilé, Tandjilé Est, Tandjilé Ouest)	0.438
-	Chad (average)	0.416
5	Zone 3 (Guéra, Batha, Salamat)	0.355
6	Zone 4 (Ouaddai, Assoungha, Sila, Wadi Fira)	0.308
7	Zone 5 (Chari-Baguirmi, Dababa, Baguirmi, Hadjer-Lamis)	0.302
8	Zone 2 (Borkou, Ennedi, Tibesti, Kanem, Barh El Gazel, Lac)	0.285

Very high human development (1.000 - 0.800)
High human development (0.799 - 0.700)
Medium human development (0.699 - 0.550)
Low human development (0.549 - 0.000)

== See also ==
- List of countries by Human Development Index
