= Béssada =

Coordinates: 8°58′N 17°43′E

- Sub-prefecture
- Location in Chad
- Country: Chad
- Region: Mandoul
- Department: Mandoul Oriental

Béssada is a sub-prefecture of Mandoul Region in Chad.
