= Ennedi Ouest (province) =

Region of Chad

Ennedi Ouest إنيدي الغربي Inīdī al-Gharbī
- Province
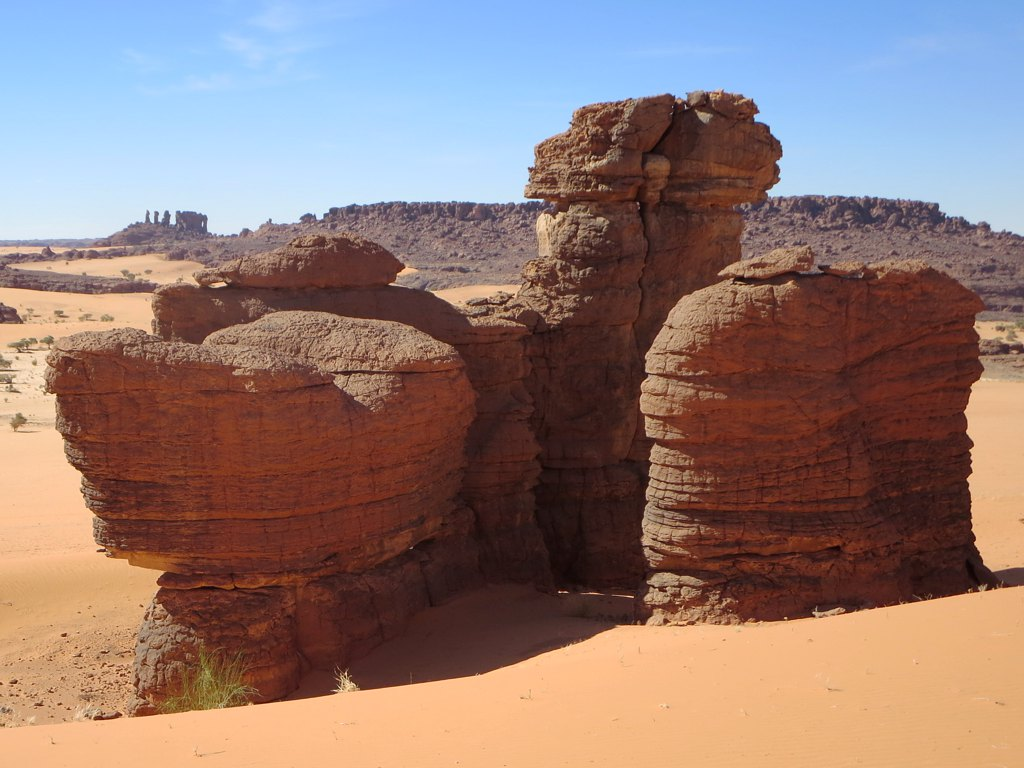
- Sandstone pillars in the Ennedi Plateau near Fada

- Map of Chad with Ennedi-Ouest highlighted in red
- Coordinates: 18°30′N 21°24′E
- Country: Chad
- Created: 2012
- Capital: Fada

Government
  - Delegate general: Goukouni Allatchi Tchoubougou

Population (2009)
  - Total: 59,744
- Time zone: UTC+01:00 (WAT)

Ennedi Ouest (Arabic: إنيدي الغربي, romanized: Inīdī al-Gharbī) is one of the twenty-three provinces of Chad.

It was created in 2012 from the western half of the former Ennedi Region. It appears to cover the same territory as the former Ennedi Ouest Department. The capital of the province is Fada.

== Geography ==
The province borders Libya to the north, Ennedi Est to the east, Wadi Fira Region to the south, and Borkou Region to the west. The province is geographically part of the Sahara Desert.

The province's northern border lies within the Aouzou Strip, historically a point of dispute between Chad and Libya.

=== Settlements ===
The provincial capital is Fada; other major settlements include Gouro, Kalait, Nohi and Ounianga Kébir.

== Demographics ==
The province's population is estimated to be 59,744. The main ethnolinguistic groups are the Tedaga, Dazaga and the Zaghawa.

== Subdivisions ==
Ennedi-Ouest is divided into two departments:

| Department | Capital | Communes |
|---|---|---|
| Fada | Fada | Fada, Gouro, Ounnianga-Kébir, Tébi, Nohi |
| Mourtcha | Kalait | Kalait, Torboul |

== Government ==
The province's first governor was Mornadji Mbaïssanébé Kar-Ouba, who previously served as a general in the Chadian Air Force and as governor of Moyen-Chari Region.

Since 2025, the leaders of the provinces of Chad are now known as delegates general of the government. The current delegate general is Goukouni Allatchi Tchoubougou, who was installed in February 2025.
