= Guélendeng =

Coordinates: 10°55′N 15°33′E

- Sub-prefecture
- Location in Chad
- Country: Chad

Guélendeng is a sub-prefecture of Mayo-Kebbi Est Region in Chad.
