= Bédaya =

- Sub-prefecture
- Location in Chad
- Coordinates: 8.920°N 17.855°E
- Country: Chad
- Region: Moyen-Chari Region
- Department: Mandoul Oriental

Bédaya is a sub-prefecture of Mandoul Region in Chad.
