= Djalal Ardjoun Khalil =

Djalal Ardjoun Khalil is a Chadian politician, teacher, and researcher.

Khalil has been Minister of Women, Early Childhood Protection and National Solidarity since November 9, 2018.

== Career ==
Khalil was Minister of Tourism Development, Culture and Handicrafts from May 8, 2018, to November 9, 2018.
