= Barh Sara =

Department of Mandoul, Chad

Coordinates: 8°20′32″N 17°45′55″E

Barh Sara is one of 3 departments which make up the region of Mandoul in southern Chad. Its capital is Moïssala.

It is divided into three sub-prefectures:

- Moïssala
- Bouna
- Dembo

== See also ==
- Departments of Chad
