= Monts de Lam conflict =

Date	April 19-May 2023
Location	Monts de Lam, Logone Oriental, Chad
Result	Chadian-Fulani victory: Chadian authorities arrest perpetrators

Belligerents
Fulani militiamen Chadian gendarmes	Kodo; CAR (local support)

Casualties and losses
Unknown	14 killed 30-50 arrested
- 41+ civilians killed 6+ civilians injured

From mid-April to May 2023, clashes have occurred between militants based in the Central African Republic and Chadian government forces and allied militias in Monts de Lam, Logone Oriental, Chad, along the border with the Central African Republic.

== Background ==
Clashes between local ethnic militias in southern Chad are not uncommon, particularly between herding and sedentary communities. Similar local clashes have occurred in other parts of Chad in recent years, like Sandana in 2022, where dozens of civilians had been killed.

In February 2023, the United States released a memo reporting that Russian Wagner Group soldiers were training militias near the CAR-Chad border, following several clashes between Chadian and Central African communities in Chad since 2022. Logone Oriental governor Ahmet Dadi Bazine said that prior to the attacks, six groups of Kodo were formed in CAR to attack Chadian communities.

== Attacks ==
=== April attacks ===
The clashes occurred between Kodo militants and Fulani civilians. In the middle of the night on April 19, Kodo militants attacked Fulani homes and a mosque, killing two people and injuring six others. Fulani militiamen organized and shot back at the Kodo, killing one and driving them away. The Kodo then attacked another village, killing four civilians. The villages that reported attacks by Kodo were Dogoro, Bendjabo, Mempon, and Dangnda. Fulani militiamen organized with the Chadian gendarmerie, and the groups surrounded the Kodo in a forest along the Central African border. The Kodo shouted "Advance", and shot at the police, with Bazine saying that the gendarmes killed 13 Kodo militants. The Chadian Bar Association disputed this report, saying that gendarmes shot at peaceful civilians during the clashes, causing several deaths and injuries.

Chadian military forces arrived in the town of Andoum in Monts de Lam shortly afterward, but this did not quell further violence. At least 23 people were killed in the clashes on all sides.

=== May attacks ===
The first attack in May occurred on May 8, when at least 17 people were killed in the village of Dion by unknown militants. Nine days later in the village of Mankade, twelve villagers were killed by what the Chadian government termed "bandits." Photos of dead children from the attacks went viral on Chadian social media. The Chadian defense minister confirmed that in early May, Chadian forces crossed the Central African border to pursue the perpetrators following the Dion attack, and that they had returned with 30 prisoners and 130 stolen cattle. Chadian authorities said that 50 men were arrested. The raid was reportedly conducted as part of a secret deal between Chadian and Central African authorities, although Central African civil society called the raid an attack on national sovereignty.

== Aftermath ==
=== September attacks ===
On September 25, a small clash between a Fulani herder family and indigenous farmers became a village-wide conflict in M'Baipor, Monts de Lam, with six people dying in the conflict and several others being injured. It is not known whether this had any connection to the Central African gangs.
