= Peni, Chad =

Peni
- Sub-prefecture
- Location in Chad
- Country: Chad
- Region: Mardoul
- Department: Mandoul Occidental

Peni is a sub-prefecture in Mandoul Occidental department or prefecture of Mandoul Region of Chad.
