= Mandoul Occidental =

Department of Mandoul, Chad

Mandoul Occidental (Mandoul West) is one of the 3 departments which make up the region of Mandoul in Chad. The capital is Bédjondo.

Mandoul Occidental has three sub-prefectures:

- Bédjondo
- Bébopen
- Békamba
