= Djédaa =

Djédaa جيدا
- Location in Chad
- Coordinates: 13°31′03″N 018°37′17″E
- Country: Chad
- Region: Batha
- Department: Batha Ouest
- Sub-Prefecture: Djedaa
- Time zone: UTC+1 (WAT)

Djédaa (Arabic: جيدا) is a town in the Batha Region of central Chad.

== Transport ==
The town is served by Djédaa Airport.
