= Joséphine Solkem Allarassem =

Chadian writer

Joséphine Solkem Allarassem is a Chadian author from the Mandoul region in southern Chad.

== Biography ==
Joséphine Solkem Allarassem is a Chadian author from the Mandoul region in southern Chad. She studied at the École Normale Supérieure in N'Djaména, after which she devoted her career to teaching French in several colleges in the capital. She has also held various positions of responsibility in the field of education. Now retired, she devotes all her time to writing.

In 2021, she was awarded the Prix de la Plume Féminine.

== Work ==
- Solkem Allarassem, J. (2005). Amours coupables: nouvelle. Cefod-Editions.
- Solkem Allarassem, J. (2021). Ce n’est qu’un rêve. Coédition NENA/Editions Toumaï.
