= Goré, Chad =

Goré غوري
- Town
- Location in Chad
- Coordinates: 7°55′32″N 16°38′04″E
- Country: Chad
- Region: Logone Oriental
- Department: La Nya Pendé
- Sub-prefecture: Goré
- Elevation: 426 m (1,396 ft)
- Time zone: UTC+01:00 (WAT)

Goré (Arabic: غوري) is a town and the capital of the La Nya Pendé in Chad's Logone Oriental Region.

Near Goré, the refugee camps of Amboko, Gondjé, and Dosseye along the Pendé River have been home to refugees from the Chad. As of 2009, "in and around Gore, over 15,000 children ... [were] currently enrolled in the more than 25 schools supported by UNICEF. This includes more than 6,000 refugee pupils. UN agricultural programs are helping the refugees move towards food self sufficiency.

In April 2014, Chadian troops escorting a convoy of "the last 540 Muslim residents" of Bossangoa, Chad to Goré, Chad were attacked by local militia as they passed through Boguila. Three people were wounded.

The town is home to a UNHCR office and a hospital.

== Climate ==
The city has a Tropical savanna climate.

Climate data for Goré
Month	Jan	Feb	Mar	Apr	May	Jun	Jul	Aug	Sep	Oct	Nov	Dec	Year
Mean daily maximum °C (°F)	35.1 (95.2)	37.1 (98.8)	37.9 (100.2)	36.5 (97.7)	34.5 (94.1)	32.1 (89.8)	30.2 (86.4)	30.0 (86.0)	30.8 (87.4)	32.6 (90.7)	35.3 (95.5)	35.2 (95.4)	33.9 (93.1)
Daily mean °C (°F)	25.4 (77.7)	27.6 (81.7)	29.9 (85.8)	29.9 (85.8)	28.6 (83.5)	26.8 (80.2)	25.6 (78.1)	25.4 (77.7)	25.7 (78.3)	26.7 (80.1)	26.7 (80.1)	25.3 (77.5)	27.0 (80.5)
Mean daily minimum °C (°F)	15.7 (60.3)	18.1 (64.6)	22.0 (71.6)	23.4 (74.1)	22.8 (73.0)	21.5 (70.7)	21.0 (69.8)	20.9 (69.6)	20.7 (69.3)	20.8 (69.4)	18.1 (64.6)	15.5 (59.9)	20.0 (68.1)
Average rainfall mm (inches)	0 (0)	0 (0)	12 (0.5)	43 (1.7)	92 (3.6)	150 (5.9)	270 (10.6)	304 (12.0)	239 (9.4)	85 (3.3)	2 (0.1)	0 (0)	1,197 (47.1)
Source: Climate-data.org
