= Békourou =

Coordinates: 8°07′N 17°30′E

- Sub-prefecture
- Location in Chad
- Country: Chad

Békourou is a sub-prefecture of Mandoul Region in Chad.
