= Djodo Gassa =

Coordinates: 9°29′N 15°10′E

- Sub-prefecture
- Location in Chad
- Country: Chad

Djodo Gassa is a sub-prefecture of Mayo-Kebbi Est Region in Chad.
