= Katoa, Chad =

Coordinates: 10°50′N 15°05′E

Katoa
- Sub-prefecture
- Location in Chad
- Country: Chad

Katoa is a sub-prefecture of Mayo-Kebbi Est Region Chad. This place is situated in Bongor, Mayo-Kebbi, Chad, its geographical coordinates are 10° 51' 0" North, 15° 5' 43" East and its original name (with diacritics) is Katoa.
