= Gounou Gaya =

Gounou Gaya غونو غايا
- Town
- Location in Chad
- Coordinates: 9°37′53″N 15°30′36″E
- Country: Chad
- Region: Mayo-Kebbi Est
- Department: Kabbia
- Sub-prefecture: Gounou Gaya

Gounou Gaya (Arabic: غونو غايا) is a town in Chad. It is the capital of the Kabbia department in Mayo-Kebbi Est Region, and is served by an airport.

Gounou Gaya is the birthplace of rebel Abdel Kader Baba-Laddé, of former prime minister Nassour Guelendouksia Ouaido, and the current prime minister Allamaye Halina.
