= Mbalkabra =

Coordinates: 8°50′N 16°06′E

- Sub-prefecture
- Location in Chad
- Country: Chad

Mbalkabra is a sub-prefecture of Logone Occidental Region in Chad.
