= Tikem =

Coordinates: 9°49′N 15°03′E

- Sub-prefecture
- Location in Chad
- Country: Chad

Tikem is a sub-prefecture of Mayo-Kebbi Est Region in Chad.
