= Bénoye =

- Location in Chad
- Coordinates: 8°59′27″N 16°19′01″E
- Country: Chad
- Region: Logone Occidental
- Department: Ngourkosso
- Sub-Prefecture: Benoye

Population (2009)
  - Total: 12,097
- Time zone: UTC+01:00 (WAT)

Bénoye is a city in the Logone Occidental Region, Chad. It is the administrative center of the Ngourkosso Department.

== Population ==
Population by years:

1993	2009
11,573	12,097
