= Ifenat =

Town in Chad

Coordinates: 13°40′N 18°39′E

Ifenat (Arabic: إفينات) is a town in the Batha Region of Chad.

== Location ==
Latitude 13.6719 Longitude 18.6420
