= Koumra =

Koumra قمرة
- City
- Location in Chad
- Coordinates: 8°54′36″N 17°33′0″E
- Country: Chad
- Region: Mandoul
- Department: Mandoul Oriental
- Sub-Prefecture: Koumra
- Elevation: 414 m (1,358 ft)

Population (2012)
  - Total: 47,950
- Time zone: UTC+01:00 (WAT)

Koumra (Arabic: قمرة, Qumra) is a city in southern Chad. It is the capital of the region of Mandoul and of the department of Mandoul Oriental. It is the sixth largest town in Chad.

== Demographics ==
Year	Population
1993	26 702
2008	38 220
