= Am Doback =

Coordinates: 13°20′7″N 15°40′16″E

- Sub-prefecture
- Location in Chad
- Country: Chad

Am Doback is a sub-prefecture of Kanem Region in Chad.
