= Beinamar =

Beinamar بينامار
- Location in Chad
- Coordinates: 08°40′05″N 15°22′49″E
- Country: Chad
- Region: Logone Occidental Region
- Department: Dodjé

Area
  - Land: 1.2 sq mi (3 km^{2})

Population (2012)
  - Total: 7,445
  - Density: 6,430/sq mi (2,482/km^{2})
- Time zone: +1

Beinamar or Béïnamar (Arabic: بينامار) is a small city in Chad. The city is the chef-lieu of the department of Dodjé, in the Logone Occidental Region of south-western Chad. It the capital of the Béïnamar sub-prefecture.
