= Fianga =

Fianga فيانكا
- Location in Chad
- Coordinates: 9°54′55″N 15°8′15″E
- Country: Chad
- Region: Mayo-Kebbi Est Region
- Department: Mont Illi
- Sub-Prefecture: Fianga

Population (2008)
  - Total: 14 166
- Time zone: +1

Fianga (Arabic: فيانكا) is a town in Chad and capital of the Mont Illi district.

== Demographics ==
Year	Population
1993	9 897
2008	14 166
