= Moïssala =

Moïssala مويسالا
- Town
- Location within Chad
- Coordinates: 08°20′15.439″N 17°46′05.82″E
- Country: Chad
- Region: Mandoul Region
- Department: Barh Sara
- Elevation: 341 m (1,119 ft)
- Time zone: UTC+1 (WAT)
  - Summer (DST): UTC+1 (Not observed)

Moïssala (Arabic: مويسالا) is the capital of Barh Sara, one of the departments of the Mandoul Region in southern Chad.
