= La Pendé =

Department of Logone Oriental, Chad

La Pendé or Pendé is one of six departments in Logone Oriental, a region of Chad. Its capital is Doba.

== See also ==
- Departments of Chad
