= Wour =

- Sub-prefecture
- Country: Chad

Wour is a sub-prefecture of Tibesti Region in Chad.
