= Mourdi =

- Sub-prefecture
- Location in Chad
- Country: Chad

Mourdi is a sub-prefecture of Ennedi Region in Chad.
