= Bouna, Chad =

Bouna
- Sub-prefecture
- Location in Chad
- Country: Chad

Bouna is a sub-prefecture of Mandoul Region in Chad.
