= Gouro, Chad =

Coordinates: 8°37′N 18°08′E

Dourgoulanga
- Sub-prefecture
- Location in Chad
- Country: Chad

Dourgoulanga is a sub-prefecture of Ennedi Region in Chad.
