= Bitkine =

Bitkin'e بتكين
- City
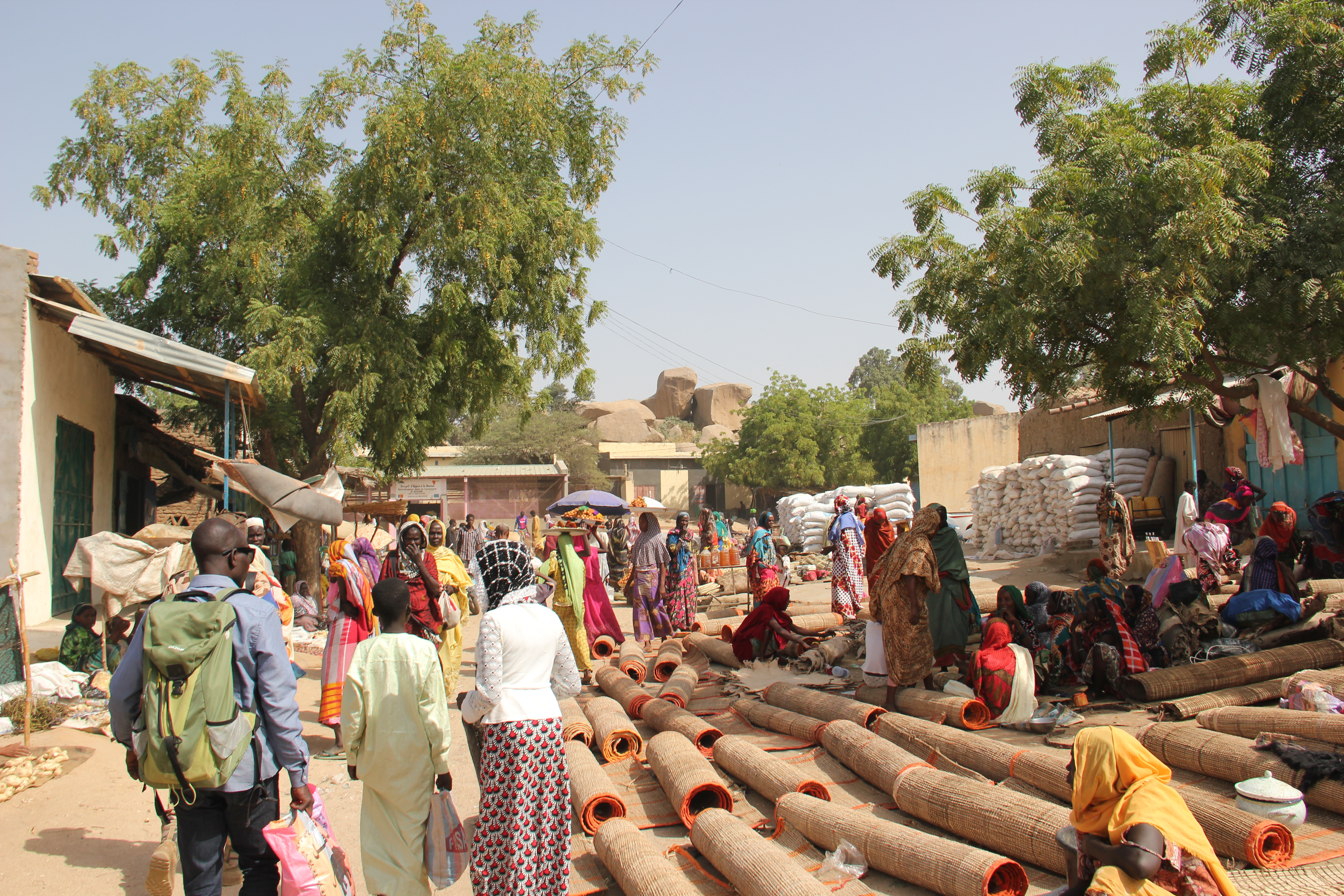
- The market of Bitkin’e

- Location in Chad
- Coordinates: 11°58′54″N 18°12′45″E
- Country: Chad
- Region: Guéra Region
- Department: Abtouyour Department
- Elevation: 1,524 ft (465 m)

Population (2012)
  - Total: 18,495
- Time zone: UTC+01:00 (WAT)

Bitkin'e (Arabic: بتكين) is a small city and sub-prefecture in the center of Chad. The city is the chef-lieu of the Abtouyour department, in Guéra Region.

== Demographics ==
Ethnic composition by canton in 2016:

Djonkor Canton (population: 17,462; villages: 24):

Ethnic group	Linguistic affiliation	Percentage
Jaya	Bagirmi	60
Arab	Semitic	30
Kenga	Bagirmi	10

Kenga Canton (population: 78,236; villages: 70):

Ethnic group	Linguistic affiliation	Percentage
Kenga	Bagirmi	95
Arab	Semitic	4
Borno	Saharan	1

Arabe Imar Canton (population: 17,565; villages: 100):

Ethnic group	Linguistic affiliation	Percentage
Arab	Semitic	90
Dangléat	East Chadic	6
Bidio	East Chadic	4
