= Mont Illi =

Department of Chad

Mont Illi or Mont d'Illi is one of four departments in Mayo-Kebbi Est, a region of Chad. Its capital is Fianga .

== See also ==
- Departments of Chad
