= Ouara Department =

Department of Chad

Coordinates: 14°11′N 20°42′E

Ouara is one of three departments in Ouaddaï, a region of Chad. Its capital is Abéché.

== See also ==
- Departments of Chad
