= Mayo-Boneye =

Department in Mayo-Kebbi, Chad

Mayo-Boneye is one of four departments in Mayo-Kebbi Est, a region of Chad. Its capital is Bongor .

== See also ==
- Departments of Chad
