= Dembo, Chad =

Dembo
- Sub-prefecture
- Location in Chad
- Coordinates: 8.1452°N 17.827°E
- Country: Chad

Dembo is a sub-prefecture of Mandoul Region in Chad.
