= Ngourkosso =

Department of Logone Occidental, Chad

Ngourkosso is one of four departments in Logone Occidental, a region of Chad. Its capital is Bénoye.

== See also ==
- Departments of Chad
