= Kabbia =

Department in Mandoul region of Chad

Coordinates: 9°37′54″N 15°30′36″E

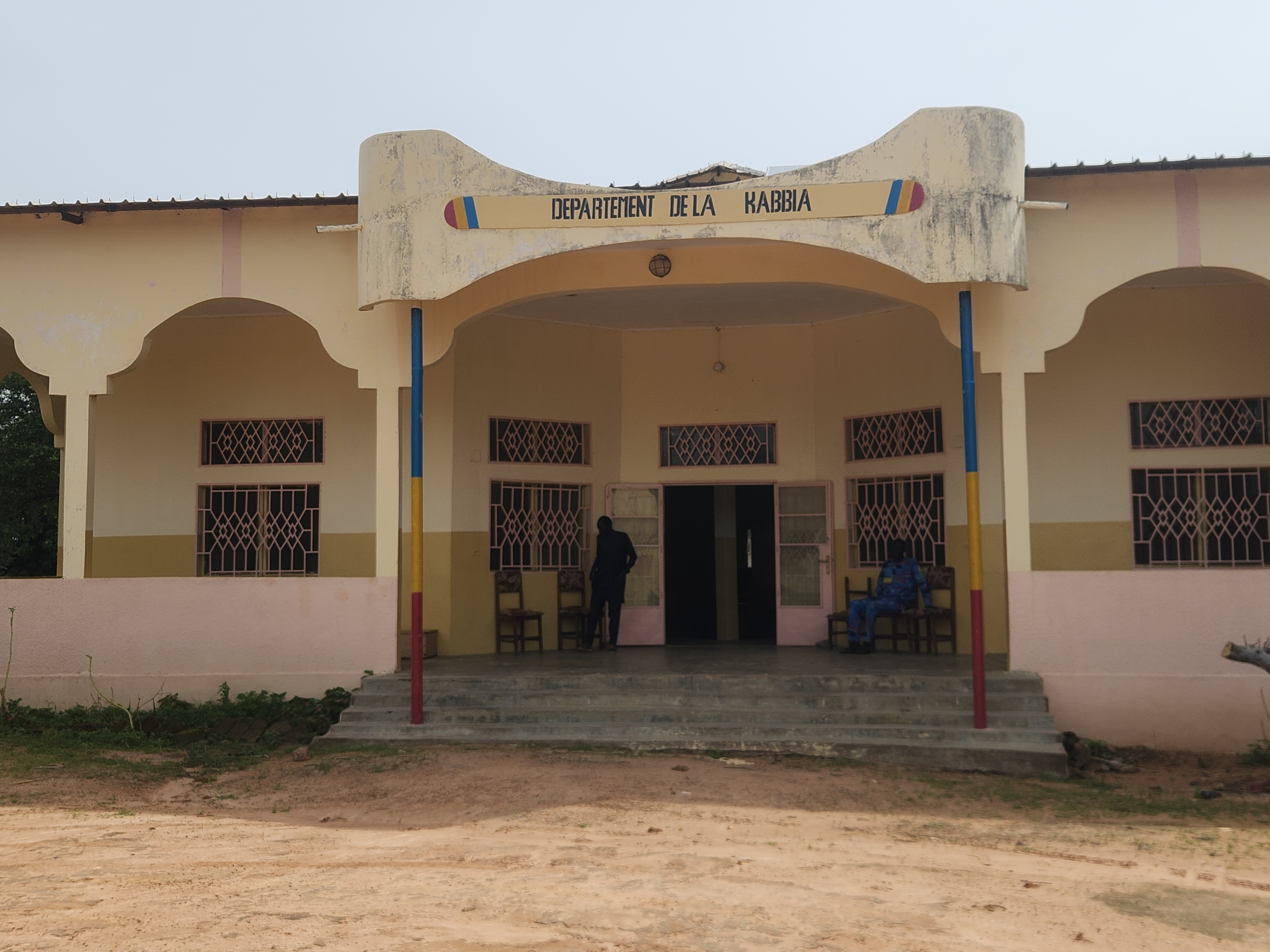
gounou gaya department of Kabbia

Kabbia is one of four departments in Mandoul, a region of Chad. Its capital is Gounou Gaya.

== See also ==
- Departments of Chad
