= Bébopen =

- Sub-prefecture
- Location in Chad
- Country: Chad

Bébopen is a sub-prefecture of Mandoul Region in Chad.
