= Abtouyour =

Department of Guéra, Chad

Abtouyour (Arabic: أبو تويور) is one of four departments of Chad in Guéra, a region of Chad. Its capital is Bitkine.

Abtouyour Department has a population of 177,850 (2016 survey) and 197 villages.
