= La Nya Pendé =

Department of Logone Oriental, Chad

Coordinates: 7°55′33″N 16°38′04″E

La Nya Pendé or Nya Pendé is one of six departments in Logone Oriental, a region of Chad. Its capital is Goré.

== See also ==
- Departments of Chad
