= Zoumri =

- Sub-prefecture
- Location in Chad
- Coordinates: 21.2°N 17.2°E
- Country: Chad

Zoumri is a sub-prefecture of Tibesti Region in Chad.
