= Dodjé =

Department of Logone Occidental, Chad

Coordinates: 8°30′23″N 15°36′12″E

Dodjé is one of four departments in Logone Occidental, a region of Chad. Its capital is Beinamar.Its located south west of Chad near the border with Cameroon.

== See also ==
- Departments of Chad
