= Abougoudam =

Coordinates: 13°40′N 20°44′E

- Sub-prefecture
- Location in Chad
- Country: Chad

Abougoudam is a sub-prefecture of Ouaddaï Region in Chad.
