= Chari-Baguirmi (province) =

Region of Chad

Coordinates: 11°24′N 16°10′E

Chari-Baguirmi شاري باقرمي Shārī Bāqirmī
- Province
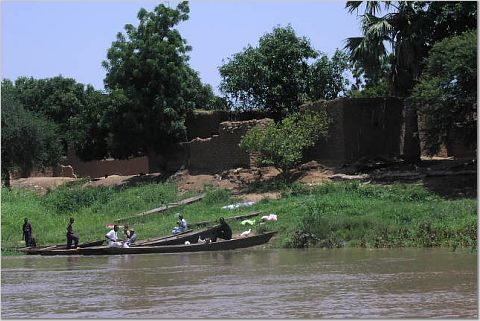
- Chari River

- Map of Chad showing Chari-Baguirmi.
- Country: Chad
- Departments: 3
- Sub-prefectures: 13
- Regional capital: Massenya
- Time zone: UTC+01:00 (WAT)
- HDI (2022): 0.286 low · 7th

Chari-Baguirmi (Arabic: شاري باقرمي, romanised: Shārī Bāqirmī) is one of the 23 provinces of Chad. Its capital is Massenya. It is composed of part of the former Chari-Baguirmi Prefecture (sub-prefectures of Massenya and Bousso) and parts of the sub-prefecture of N'Djamena).

== History ==
The region was the historic heartland of the Sultanate of Bagirmi, which ruled much of the area from its capital in Massenya from the late 15th - late 19th centuries.

== Geography ==
The province borders Hadjer-Lamis Region to the north, Guéra Region to the east, Moyen-Chari Region to the southeast, Tandjilé Region to the south, and Mayo-Kebbi Est Region, N'Djamena and Cameroon to the west. The Chari River flows through the west and south of the region.

=== Settlements ===
Massenya is the regional capital; other major settlements include Bä Illi, Bogomoro, Bousso, Dourbali, Koundoul, La Loumia, Linia, Maï Aïche, Mandélia and Mogo.

== Demographics ==
As per the census of 2009 the population in the province was 621,785, with 50.30% females. The average size of household as of 2009 is 5.40; it was 5.40 in rural households, whilst it was 5.40 in urban areas. The number of households was 115,118: it was 102,322 in rural areas and 12,796 in urban areas. The number of nomads in the region was 31,205, 8% of the population. There were 620,126 people residing in private households. There were 267,256 above 18 years of ages: 129,272 male and 137,984 female. The sex ratio was 99.00 females for every hundred males. There were 590,580 sedentary staff, constituting 5.50 of the population.

The main ethnolinguistic groups are Chadian Arabs (generally speaking Chadian Arabic), Bagirmi, Fula, Gadang, Kanuri, Kwang, Lagwan, Majera, Mbara, Mser, Ndam and Sarua.

== Administration ==
The Chari-Baguirmi region is divided into three departments: Baguirmi (capital of Massenya), Chari (capital of Mandélia) and Loug Chari (capital of Bousso). As a part of decentralisation in February 2003, the country was administratively split into regions, departments, municipalities and rural communities. The prefectures, which were originally 14 in number, were re-designated into 17 regions. The regions are administered by Governors appointed by the President. Prefects, who originally held the responsibility of the 14 prefectures, still retained their titles and were responsible for the administration of smaller departments in each region. The members of local assemblies are elected every six years, while the executive organs are elected every three years. As of 2016, there are totally 23 regions in Chad, which are divided based on population and administrative convenience.

On 10 August 2018, a new ordinance (Note: Ordinance No. 038/PR/2018) divided Chad into 23 provinces, 107 departments, and 377 communes. The names of the former regions remained the same but were now called provinces.

== See also ==
- Baguirmi Kingdom
