= Assoungha Department =

Coordinates: 13°28′02″N 22°12′02″E

Assoungha is one of three departments in Ouaddaï, a region of Chad. Its capital is Adré.

== Sub-prefectures ==
Assoungha is divided into four sub-prefectures:

- Adré
- Hadjer Hadid
- Mabrone
- Borota
- Molou
- Tourane

== See also ==
- Regions of Chad
