= Barh Kôh =

Barh Kôh is one of three departments in Moyen-Chari, a region of Chad. Its capital is Sarh.

== See also ==
- Departments of Chad
