= Batha Ouest =

Department of Batha, Chad

Batha Ouest (Arabic: البطحة الغربية) or Batha West is one of the three departments which make up the region of Batha in Chad. The capital is Ati.

== sub-prefectures ==
Batha Ouest is divided into three sub-prefectures:

- Ati
- Djedda
- Koundjourou
