= Tandjilé Est =

Department of Chad

Tandjilé Est is one of two departments in Tandjilé, a region of Chad. Its capital is Laï.

== See also ==
- Departments of Chad
