= Wadi Bissam =

Department of Kanem, Chad

- Department
- Location in Chad
- Country: Chad

Wadi Bissam is a department of Kanem Region in Chad. It was created by Order No. 002 / PR / 08 of 19 February 2008. Its chief town is Mondo.

== Subdivisions ==
The Wadi Bissam department is divided into 2 sub-prefectures:

- Mondo
- Am Doback

== Administration ==
List of administrators :

Prefect of Wadi Bissam (since 2008)

- October 9, 2008 : Sossal Samatete
- November 3, 2009 : Younous Lony
