= Bédjondo =

Coordinates: 8°38′N 17°11′E

- Sub-prefecture
- Location in Chad
- Country: Chad

Bédjondo is a sub-prefecture in Chad.
