= Goundi =

Coordinates: 9°22′N 17°22′E

- Sub-prefecture
- Location in Chad
- Country: Chad

Goundi is a sub-prefecture of Mandoul Region in Chad.
