= Nohi =

Dourgoulanga
- Sub-prefecture
- Location in Chad
- Country: Chad

Nohi is a sub-prefecture of Ennedi Region in Chad.
