= Mandoul (province) =

Province of Chad

Coordinates: 8°54′36″N 17°33′00″E

Mandoul ماندول Māndūl
- Province
- Map of Chad showing Mandoul.
- Country: Chad
- Departments: 3
- Sub-prefectures: 15
- Provincial capital: Koumra

Population (2009)
  - Total: 628,065
- Time zone: UTC+01:00 (WAT)

Mandoul (Arabic: ماندول, romanised: Māndūl) is one of the 23 provinces of Chad. Located in the south of the country, it comprises part of the former prefecture of Moyen-Chari. The provincial capital is Koumra.

== Geography ==
The province borders Tandjilé Region to the north-west, Moyen-Chari Region to the east, the Central African Republic to the south, and Logone Oriental Region to the west.

=== Settlements ===
Koumra the provincial capital; other major settlements include Bébopen, Béboro, Bédaya, Bédjondo, Békamba, Békourou, Béssada, Bouna, Dembo, Goundi, Moïssala, Mouroum Goulaye, Ngangara and Peni.

== Demography ==
The population of Mandoul is 628,065 inhabitants, as per the Chadian census of 2009. The main ethnolinguistic groups are the Day, Doba peoples (speaking the closely related Bedjond, Mango and Gor languages), Gulay, Lutos, Mbay, Ndam, Sara and Tumak.

== Economy ==
The main products are subsistence agriculture and cotton.

== Subdivisions ==
The province of Mandoul is divided into three departments:

Department	Capital (chef-lieu)	Sub-prefectures
Mandoul Occidental	Bédjondo	Bédjondo, Bébopen, Békamba, Peni
Mandoul Oriental	Koumra	Koumra, Bessada, Bédaya, Goundi, Ngangara, Mouroum Goulaye
Barh Sara	Moïssala	Moïssala, Beboro, Bekourou, Bouna, Dembo
