= Mandoul Oriental =

Department of Mandoul, Chad

Mandoul Oriental is one of three departments in Mandoul, a region of Chad. Its capital is Koumra.

== See also ==
- Departments of Chad
