= Batha (region) =

Region of Chad

Coordinates: 13.214°N 18.336°E

Batha البطحة al-Baṭḥā
- Province
- Map of Chad showing Batha.
- Country: Chad
- Departments: 3
- Sub-prefectures: 10
- Regional capital: Ati

Population (2009)
  - Total: 527,031
- Time zone: UTC+01:00 (WAT)
- HDI (2022): 0.336 low · 5th

Batha (Arabic: البطحة, romanized: al-Baṭḥā) is one of the 23 regions of Chad, located in the centre of the country. It is composed of what was formerly Batha Prefecture with some slight boundary adjustments. The capital of the region is Ati; other major settlements include Am Sack, Assinet, Djédaa, Haraze Djombo Kibit, Hidjelidjé, Oum Hadjer and Yao.

== Geography ==
The province borders Borkou Region to the north, Wadi Fira Region and Ouaddaï Region to the east, Sila Region to the south-east, Guéra Region to the south, Hadjer-Lamis Region to the south-west, and Bahr el Gazel Region to the west. The terrain is generally savannah grassland, merging into the Sahara Desert in the sparsely populated north of the region. Lake Fitri is located in the south-west of the region. The surface of the province is 93,732 km2.

The Batha region is part of the Sahelian acacia savanna ecoregion and encompasses three primary habitat types: Sahelian wooded grassland, sub-desert grassland, and desert. The landscape is predominantly flat with rivers, and the climate is characterized by two seasons. The region experiences annual rainfall ranging from 200 to 800 mm during the rainy season. The dry season lasts for about nine months, with temperatures soaring between 40 °C and 43 °C. In contrast, the cooler months, from December to February, see temperatures ranging from 11 °C to 23 °C.

=== Flora ===
The Batha province is located in Chad’s Sahel zone. It is characterized by semi-desert grassland, thorny shrubland, and wooded grassland. Vegetation includes drought-tolerant species such as Senegalia species, Egyptian balsam (Balanites aegyptiaca), African myrrh (Commiphora africana), and members of the Euphorbiaceae family. In some areas of the upper northern side, fixed dunes with annual grasses are interspersed with trees like Sudan gum (Senegalia Senegal), Combretum glutinosum, and Hanza (Boscia senegalensis). Typical grasses in the sub-desert zone include Aristida mutabilis, Cenchrus biflorus, and Chloris prieurii, alongside herbs such as Limeum viscosum and Blepharis linariifolia. Around Lake Fitri and seasonal wetlands, vegetation shifts to wetland species like Burgu millet (Echinochloa stagnina), Vossia cuspidata, and seasonally flooded woodlands with Egyptian acacia (Vachellia nilotica) and Mitragyna inermis.

=== Fauna ===
==== Birds ====
The Batha province is home to approximately 300 bird species, including the threatened black crowned crane (Balearica pavonina). Two Important Bird Areas (IBAs) are designated within the Batha region: Ouadi Rimé - Ouadi Achim and Lake Fitri. The Ouadi Rimé - Ouadi Achim IBA is the largest of Chad's nine IBAs, covering the entire northern half of the Batha province. This IBA is home to at least 267 bird species. Located in the southwestern part of the province, Lake Fitri IBA is a crucial site for migratory species such as the black-tailed godwit (Limosa limosa) and serves as a vital drought refuge for many nomadic bird species.

==== Mammals ====
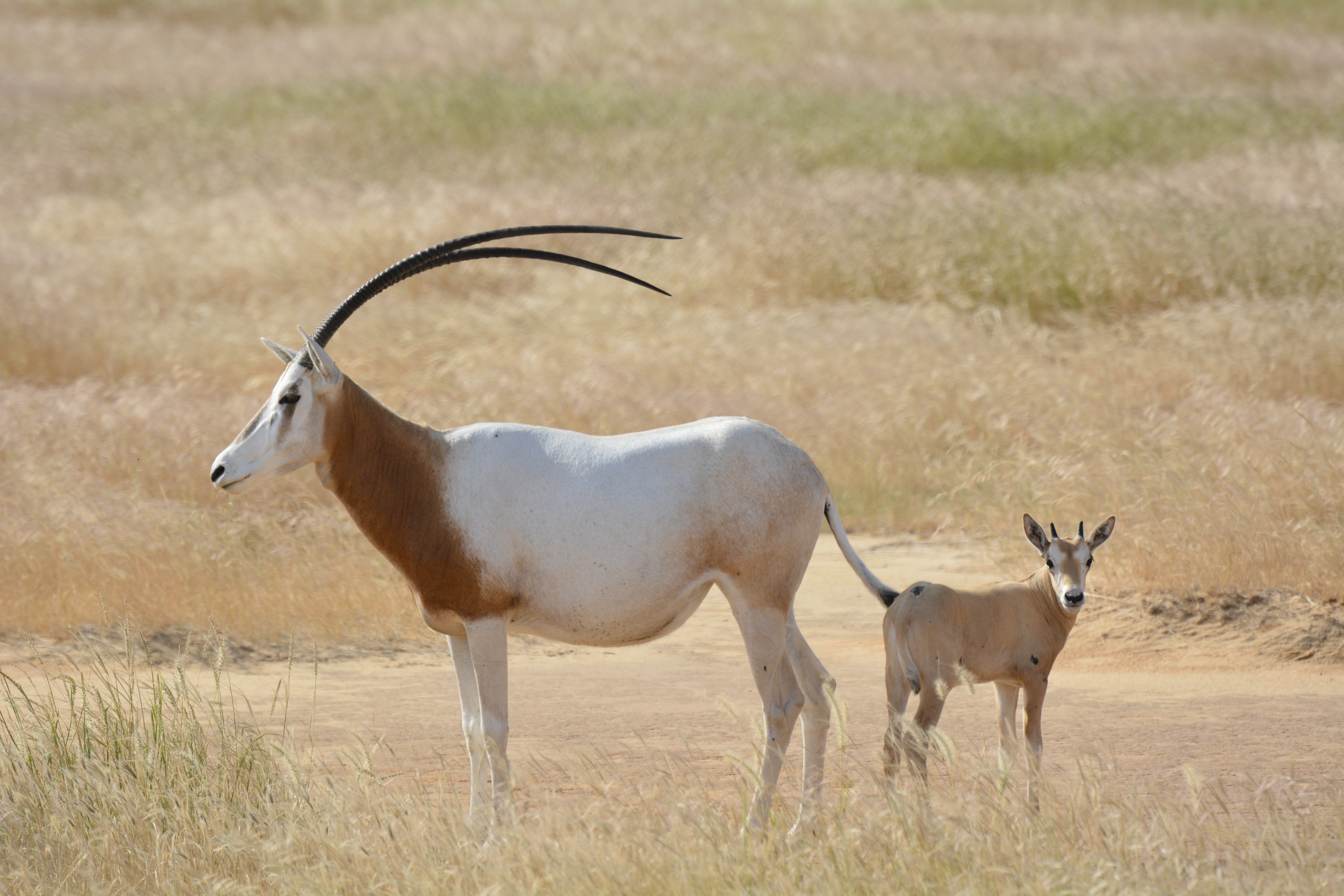
Scimitar horned oryx and calf

The Batha province is home to a variety of mammal species, although many of the larger ones have declined significantly or disappeared from the region over the past century. Species that still occur include Sahelian and Saharan ungulates such as the critically endangered dama gazelle (Nanger dama), red-fronted gazelle (Eudorcas rufifrons), and dorcas gazelle (Gazella dorcas), as well as predators such as the striped hyena (Hyaena hyaena) and African wolf (Canis lupaster). The Ouadi Rimé - Ouadi Achim Faunal Reserve was the last known refuge of the scimitar-horned oryx (Oryx dammah) before the species became extinct in the wild in 2000. Since 2016, there have been several reintroductions of captive bred individuals. As of 2025, the population in the reserve had grown to around 400 individuals. Other species such as the Northeast African cheetah (Acinonyx jubatus soemmeringii) have gone locally extinct and have not been reintroduced.

=== Ecological Threats ===
The Batha province of Chad faces significant ecological threats, primarily driven by land degradation and climate change, which are major contributors to biodiversity loss.

Land degradation is largely caused by intensive agricultural practices and livestock overgrazing, which can lead to habitat fragmentation and a decline in biodiversity. Much of the region’s soil conditions are poor, with low water retention capacity and a sandy texture, making the land highly vulnerable to wind and water erosion. Irrigated areas and wetlands are particularly affected by soil salinization, which further reduces soil fertility and accelerates land degradation.

Climate change exacerbates these issues by increasing rainfall variability, more frequent and intense heat waves, and longer, more severe droughts, all of which place additional stress on ecosystems and wildlife.

Furthermore, growing human populations in the region contribute to increased pressure on land and natural resources. This increasing pressure can lead to conflicts over land, further habitat destruction, and the overexploitation of resources through overgrazing, agricultural intensification, and rapid development.

=== Conservation Measures ===
Sustainable land management practices such as agroforestry, mobile pastoralism, and farmer-managed natural regeneration offer potential solutions to combat overgrazing while protecting biodiversity and local livelihoods. Protected areas are another conservation strategy that plays a major role in sustainable land management and species conservation.

The Ouadi Rimé–Ouadi Achim Faunal Reserve encompasses three distinct ecoregions: the Saharan Desert, the South Saharan Steppe, and the Sahelian Acacia savanna. The reserve is classified as a “Habitat/Species Management Area” under Category IV of the IUCN Protected Area Management Categories, indicating that it is managed mostly for conservation, but some human activity is allowed. The reserve has the highest irreplaceability index in all Protected Areas of Chad and is a key site for the reintroduction of the scimitar-horned oryx. As a result of the project, the species was downlisted from Extinct in the Wild to Endangered on the IUCN Red List in 2023.

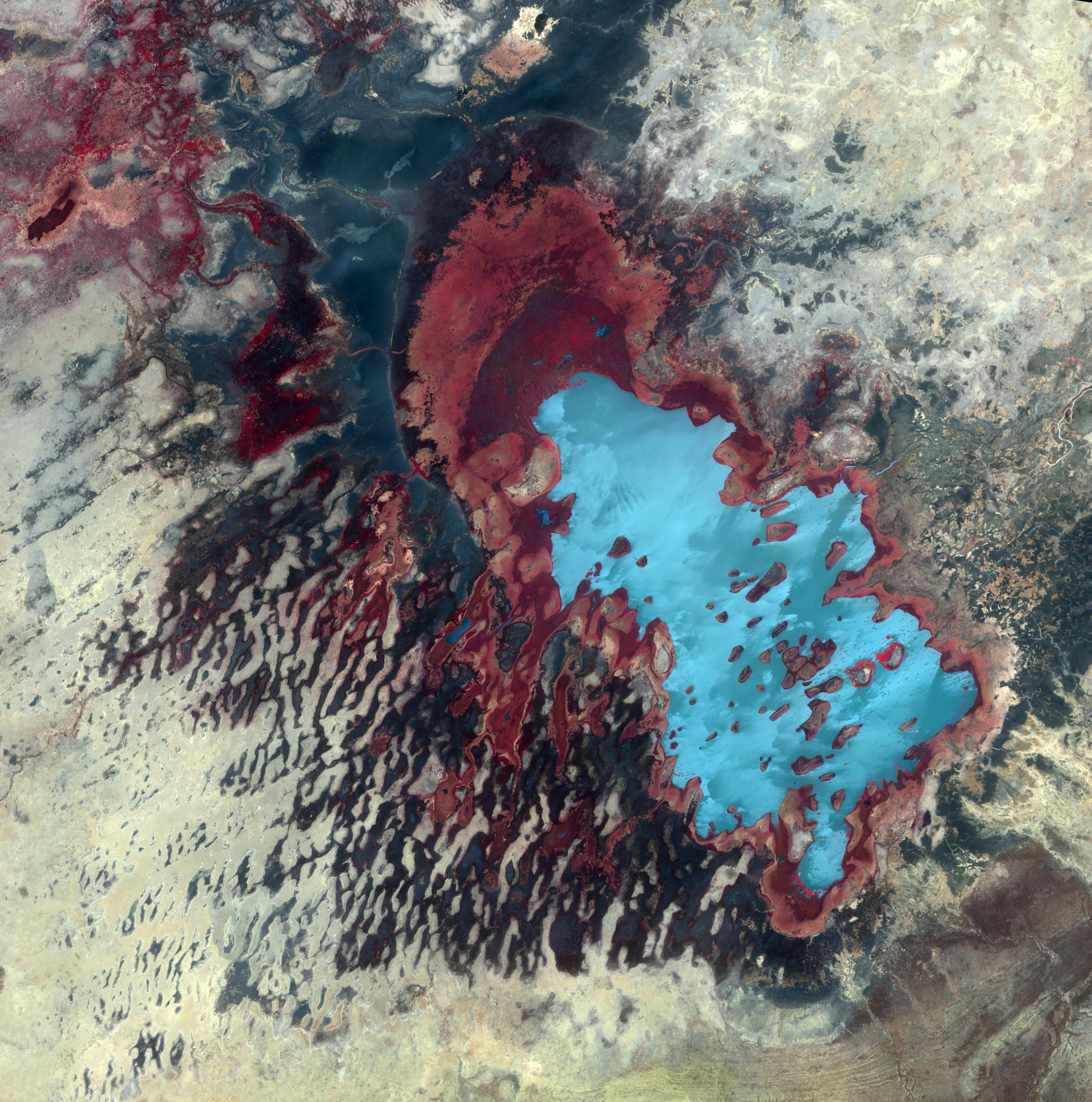
Lake Fitri in 2017

Lake Fitri is recognized as a Biosphere Reserve and was designated as a Ramsar Site in 1990. These designations impose different protections regarding sustainable use as well as integration between conservation objectives and economic development. Lake Fitri plays an important role in the local economy, particularly during dryer periods. It supports extensive seasonal grazing and a well-managed fishery with an annual yield exceeding 3,000 tons, sustained by strong local conservation practices, including widespread compliance with a ban on fishing nets.

== Demographics ==
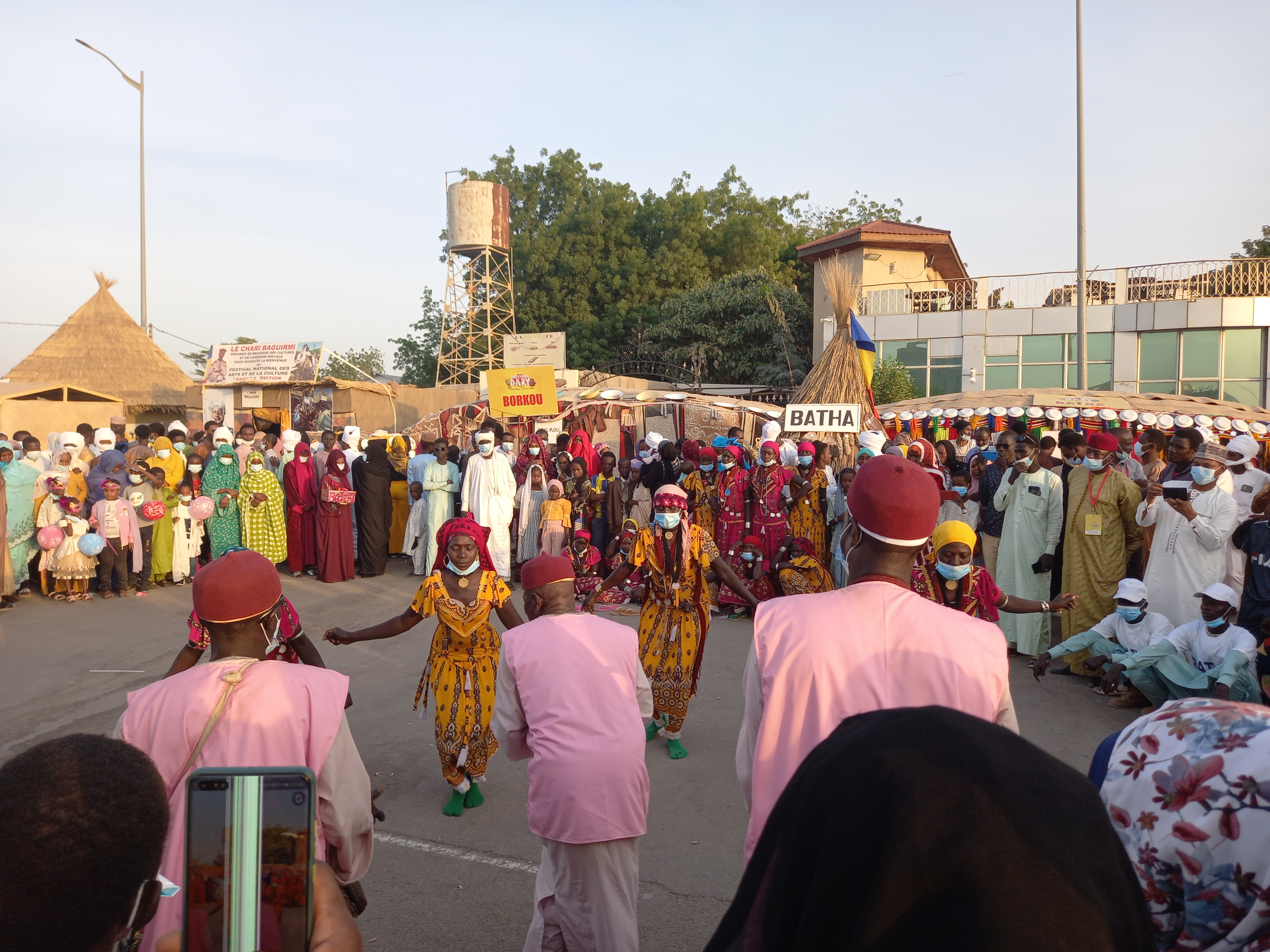
Traditional dance of Batha Region in 2022.

As per the Chadian census of 2009, the population of the province was 527,031, 51.9% female. The average size of household as of 2009 is 5.1 in rural households and 5.4 in urban areas. The number of households was 103,261: 89,991 in rural areas and 13,270 in urban areas. The number of nomads in the region was 37,419, 9.6% of the population. There were 526,008 people residing in private households. There were 221,810 people above 18 years of age: 98,651 male and 123,159 female. The sex ratio was 0.93 (93 females per 100 males).

The main ethnolinguistic groups are Arab groups such as the Baggara, who predominantly speak Chadian Arabic (33.62%), Dar Daju Daju (percentage not known), Lisi groups such as the Bilala (18.11%) and Naba-Kuka (15.71%), the Masalit (5.73%) and the Masmaje (5.61%).

== Economy ==
As of 2015, internet and telephone were limited and post was the primary mode of communication.

In 2016 gold was discovered in the region, and many people from all over Chad, and some from as far away as Niger and Sudan, began flocking here. However, the Chadian army moved to prevent anyone from getting into the region.

== Administration ==
As a part of decentralisation in February 2003, Chad was administratively split into regions, departments, municipalities and rural communities. The prefectures which were originally 14 in number were re-designated in 23 regions. The regions are administered by Governors appointed by the President. The Prefects, who originally held the responsibility of the 14 prefectures, still retained their titles and were responsible for the administration of smaller departments in each region. The members of local assemblies are elected every six years, while the executive organs are elected every three years. As of 2016, there are 23 regions in Chad, which are divided based on population and administrative convenience. On 10 August 2018, a new ordinance (Note: Ordinance No. 038/PR/2018) divided Chad into 23 provinces, 107 departments, and 377 communes. The names of the former regions remained the same but were now called provinces.

=== Subdivisions ===
The region of Batha is divided into three departments: Batha Est, Batha Ouest and Fitri.
