= Hadjer-Lamis (region) =

Region of Chad

Hadjer-Lamis حجر لميس
- Province
- Hadjer-Lamis Region
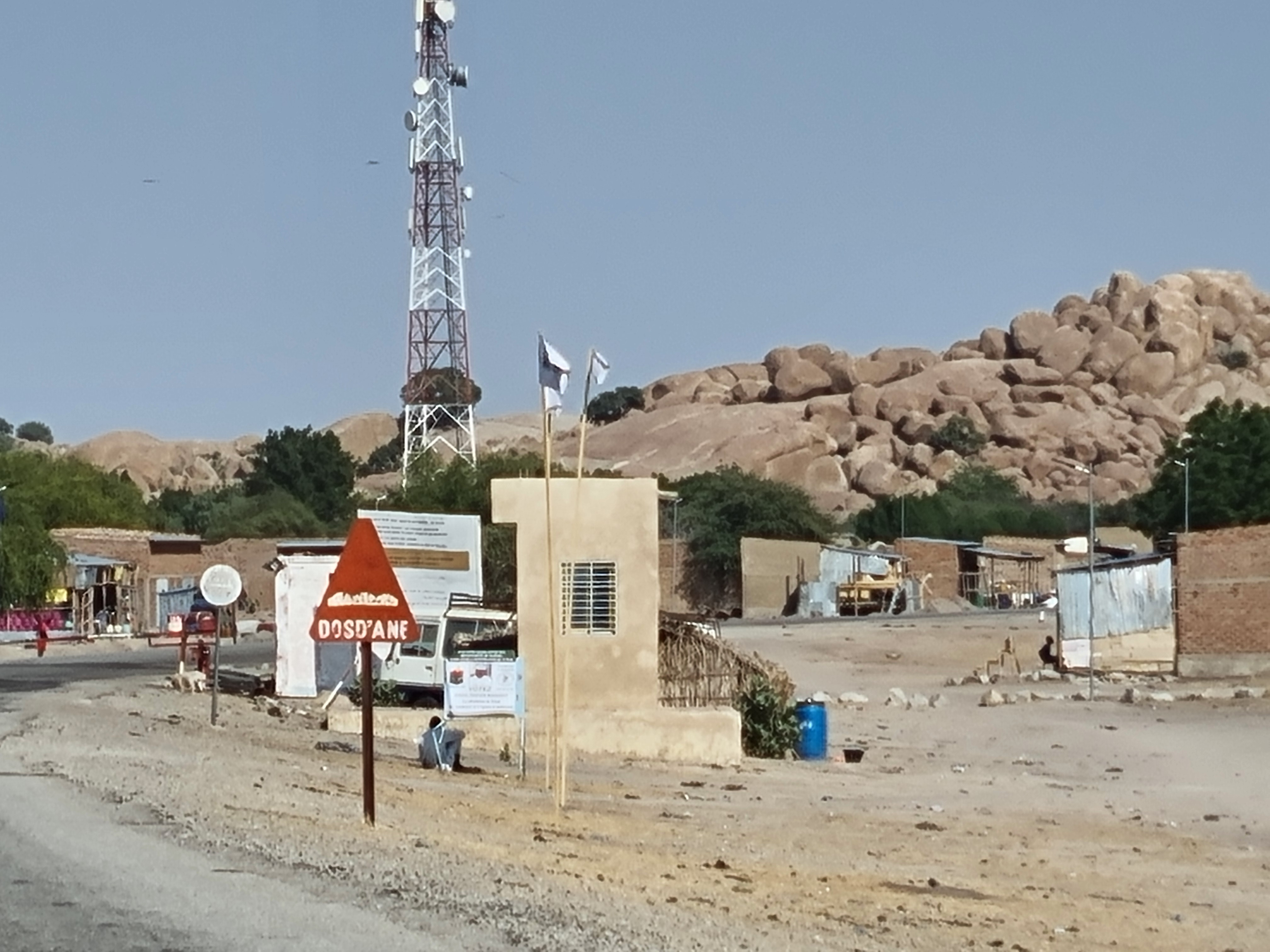
- Entrance to Ngoura rock formations

- Location of Hadjer-Lamis region in Chad
- Country: Chad
- Capital: Massakory

Area
  - Total: 31,426 km^{2} (12,134 sq mi)

Population (2009 census)
  - Total: 562,957
  - Density: 17.914/km^{2} (46.396/sq mi)
- Time zone: UTC+01:00 (WAT)
- HDI (2022): 0.286 low · 7th

Hadjer-Lamis (Arabic: حجر لميس, romanised: Ḥajar Lamīs) is one of the 23 provinces of Chad, located in the southwest of the country. Its capital is Massakory. It corresponds to part of the former prefecture of Chari-Baguirmi (sub-prefectures of Bokoro and of Massakory) and parts of N'Djamena.

== Geography ==
The province borders Lac Region, Kanem Region and Bahr el Gazel Region to the north, Batha Region and Guéra Region to the east, Chari-Baguirmi Region and N'Djamena to the south, and Cameroon to the west. The far north-west of the region borders on Lake Chad.

=== Settlements ===
Massakory is the provincial capital; other major settlements include Bokoro, Gama, Karal, Massaguet, Moïto, N'Djamena Fara and Tourba.

== Demographics ==
Per the census of 2009, the total population in the province was 562,957, 50.1% females. The average size of households as of 2009 was 5.1: 5.1 in rural households, 4.7 in urban areas. The total number of households was 110,170: it was 93,126 in rural areas and 17,044 in urban areas. The number of nomads in the region was 26,615, 6.9% of the total population. There were 559,339 people residing in private households. There were 239,133 people above 18 years of age: 115,212 male and 123,921 female. The sex ratio was 100.00 for every hundred males. There were 536,342 sedentary staff, 5% of the total population.

The main ethnolinguistic groups are the Kanembu, Buduma, Dazaga Tubou, Kanuri, Malgbe, Baggara Arabs, and Mpade.

== Administration ==
The region of Hadjer-Lamis is divided into four departments, namely, Dababa (capital Bokoro), Dagana (capital Massakory), Haraze al-Biar (capital Massaguet), and Ngoura (capital Ngoura).
