= Logone Oriental (region) =

Region of Chad

Coordinates: 8°39′N 16°51′E

Logone Oriental لوغون الشرقي Lūghūn ash-Sharqī
- Region
- Map of Chad showing Logone Oriental.
- Country: Chad
- Departments: 6
- Sub-prefectures: 23
- Regional capital: Doba

Area
  - Total: 28,035 km^{2} (10,824 sq mi)

Population (2009)
  - Total: 779,339
  - Density: 27.799/km^{2} (71.999/sq mi)
- Time zone: UTC+01:00 (WAT)

Logone Oriental (Arabic: لوغون الشرقي, romanised: Lūghūn ash-Sharqī) is one of the 23 regions of Chad, located in the south-west of the country. Its capital is Doba. It is coterminous with the former Logone Oriental Prefecture.

== Geography ==
The region was created in 2002 out of the old Logone Oriental Prefecture following a reform of Chad's administrative divisions. It borders Logone Occidental Region and Tandjilé Region to the north, Mandoul Region to the east, the Central African Republic to the south, and Cameroon to the west.

=== Settlements ===
Doba is the regional capital; other major settlements include Baïbokoum, Baké, Béboni, Béboto, Békan, Béssao, Béti, Bodo, Dobiti, Donia, Goré, Komé, Laramanaye, Madana, Mbaïkoro, Mbikou, Mbitoye, Miandoum, Yamodo.

== Crime ==
For most of the 21st century, the area has been considered by international observers as a high-crime area. This is due to the large amounts of kidnappings and murders. Due to the proximity to the Cameroon border, which the Chadian authorities do not have effective control of in the region, the victims often get trafficked into Cameroon to be held pending any ransom payment. There are also regular violent conflicts between the herder communities that live in Logone Oriental. In addition, immigrants from the Central African Republic have also faced violent attacks in the area.

== Demography ==
The 2009 Chadian census reported a population for the region of 779,339. In 1993 the population was 440,342.

The main ethnolinguistic groups are Doba peoples (speaking the closely related Bedjond, Mango and Gor languages), Karang, Kuo, Nzakambay, Pana and Sara groups (speaking language/dialects such as Kabba, Laka and Ngambay).

== Subdivisions ==
The region of Logone Oriental is divided in six departments:

| Department | Capital | Sub-prefectures |
|---|---|---|
| Nya | Bébédjia | Bébédjia, Mbikou, Béboni, Miandoum, Komé |
| Nya Pendé | Goré | Békan, Donia, Goré, Yamodo |
| Pendé | Doba | Doba, Kara, Madana |
| Kouh-Est | Bodo | Bodo, Bédjo, Béti |
| Kouh-Ouest | Béboto | Béboto, Baké, Dobiti |
| Monts de Lam | Baïbokoum | Baïbokoum, Bessao, Mbaïkoro, Mbitoye, Laramanaye |
