= Kanem (region) =

Region of Chad

Coordinates: 14.1194°N 15.3133°E

Kanem كانم Kānim
- Region
- Map of Chad showing Kanem.
- Country: Chad
- Departments: 3
- Sub-prefectures: 10
- Regional capital: Mao

Government
  - Governor: Ngamai Djari (2008)

Population (2009)
  - Total: 354,603
- Time zone: UTC+01:00 (WAT)

Kanem (Arabic: كانم, romanised: Kānim) is one of the 23 regions of Chad. It is named after the famous Kanem Empire, which was centred in this vicinity. The region's capital is Mao. It was created in 2002 from the former prefecture of Kanem. In 2008, a portion of the Kanem region (the Bahr el Gazel Department) was split off to become the new Bahr el Gazel Region.

== Geography ==
The region borders Borkou Region to the north, Bahr el Gazel Region to the east, Hadjer-Lamis Region and Lac Region to the south, and Niger to the west.

=== Settlements ===
Mao is the regional capital; other major settlements include Am Doback, Kekedina, Nokou, Ntiona, Rig Rig, Wadjigui and Ziguey.

== Demographics ==
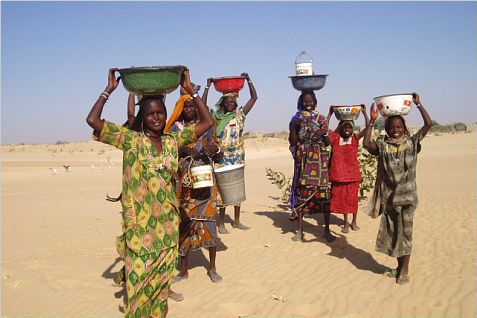
Women in the region

As per the census of 2009, the population in the region was 354,603, 51.4% female. The average size of household was 4.50: 4.50 in rural households and 4.90 in urban areas. The number of households was 78,145: 70,779 in rural areas and 7,366 in urban areas. The number of nomads in the region was 10,056, 2.6% of the population. There were 354,007 people residing in private households. There were 157,264 over 18 years of age: 70,134 male and 87,130 female. The sex ratio was 94.00 females for every hundred males. There were 344,547 sedentary staff, 3.20 of the population.

The principal ethnolinguistic groups are Baggara Arabs (4.97%), Dazaga Toubou (48.25%), Fula and Kanembu (40.54%).

== Economy ==
The region is the principal agricultural segment in the whole country, producing cotton and groundnuts, the two main cash crops of the country. There are a variety of local crops such as rice also grown in the region.

== Administration ==
Since 2008, the region of Kanem is divided in three departments, namely, Kanem (capital Mao), Nord Kanem (capital of Nokou) and Wadi Bissam (capital of Mondo). As a part of decentralization in February 2003, the country is administratively split into regions, departments, municipalities and rural communities. The prefectures which were originally 14 in number were re-designated in 17 regions. The regions are administered by Governors appointed by the President. Prefects, who originally held the responsibility of the 14 prefectures, still retained their titles and were responsible for the administration of smaller departments in each region. The members of local assemblies are elected every six years, while the executive organs are elected every three years.

== See also ==
- Kanem–Bornu Empire
