= Provinces of Chad =

First-level administrative divisions of Chad

The Republic of Chad is divided into 23 provinces. (Note: French: provinces)

Chad was divided into regions in 2002. It was previously divided into prefectures, and then departments.

On 10 August 2018, a new ordinance (Note: Ordinance No. 038/PR/2018) divided Chad into 23 provinces, 95 departments, and 365 communes. The names of the former regions remained the same but were now called provinces. On 4 July 2024, a new ordinance further divided the 23 provinces into 120 departments and 454 sub-prefectures.

Until 2025, the leaders of the provinces of Chad were known as governors. They are now called delegates general of the government.

== Current provinces ==
This is a list of the provinces of Chad (called regions before 2018), with official population figures from the 2009 census, and estimated population figures for mid 2023.

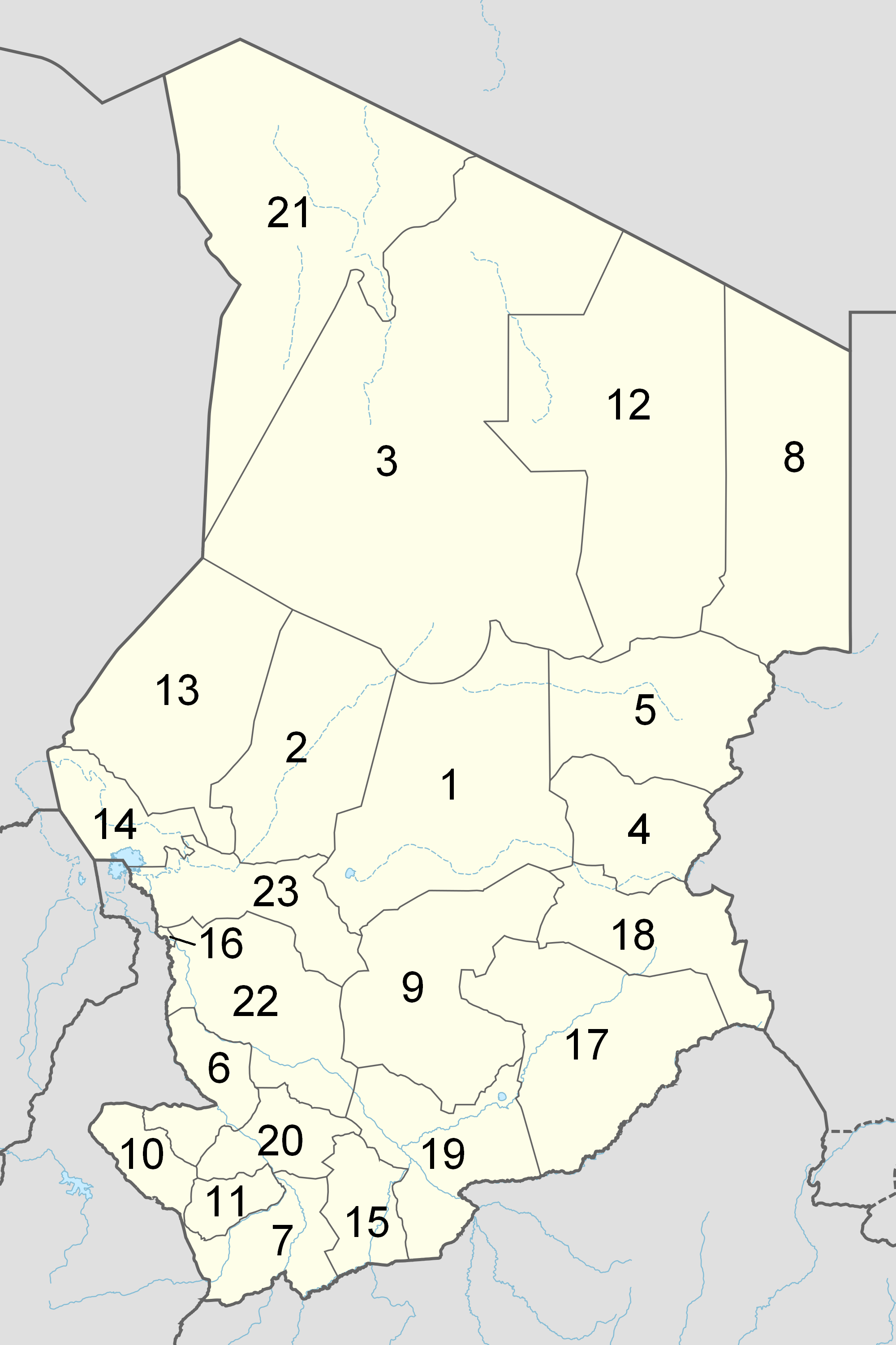
Administrative regions of Chad since 2012

No.	Province	Pop'n (2009)	Pop'n (1 July 2023)	Est. Area (km^{2})	Capital	Departments
2	Bahr el-Gazel	257,267	407,256	58,525	Moussoro	Barh el-Gazel Nord, Barh el-Gazel Sud, Barh el-Gazel Ouest, Barh el-Gazel Est, Kleta
1	Batha	488,458	748,395	93,732	Ati	Batha Est, Batha Ouest, Fitri, Ouadi-Rimé, Assinet, Haraze
3	Borkou	93,584	154,865	271,513	Faya	Borkou, Borkou-Yala, Kouba
22	Chari-Baguirmi	578,425	884,924	47,226	Massenya	Baguirmi, Chari, Loug-Chari, Dourbali
8	Ennedi-Est	107,302	175,321	81,696	Amdjarass	Amdjarass, Wadi Hawar, Itou, Nohi, Bao, Mourdi
12	Ennedi-Ouest	60,617	109,753	117,686	Fada	Fada, Mourtcha, Lac-Ounianga, Tebi, Gouro, Torbol
9	Guéra	538,359	824,161	62,678	Mongo	Guéra, Abtouyour, Barh-Signaka, Mangalmé, Garada
23	Hadjer-Lamis	566,858	870,231	31,376	Massakory	Dagana, Dababa Haraz-al-Biar, Ngoura
13	Kanem	333,387	505,839	70,516	Mao	Kanem-Centre, Kanem-Nord, Kanem-Sud, Kanem-Est, Kanem-Ouest
14	Lac	331,496	509,258	20,543	Bol	Mamdi, Wayi, Kaya, Fouli, Kouloukime
11	Logone Occidental	689,044	1,053,958	8,969	Moundou	Lac-Wey, Guéni, Ngourkosso, Dodjé
7	Logone Oriental	779,339	1,184,567	24,119	Doba	La Pendé, La Nya, La Nya-Pendé, Kouh-Est, Kouh-Ouest, Monts de Lam
15	Mandoul	628,065	1,002,346	17,761	Koumra	Barh-Sara, Mandoul Occidental, Mandoul Oriental, Goundi, Taralnass, Mandoul Central
6	Mayo-Kebbi Est	774,782	1,179,260	18,458	Bongor	Mayo-Boneye, Mayo-Lémié, Mont-Illi, Kabbia
10	Mayo-Kebbi Ouest	564,470	858,593	12,787	Pala	Mayo-Dallah, Mayo-Binder, Lac-Léré, El-Ouaya, Nanaye
19	Moyen-Chari	588,008	902,311	42,307	Sarh	Barh-Kôh, Grande Sido, Lac-Iro, Korbol, La Moula, Bragoto
4	Ouaddaï	721,166	1,102,467	30,790	Abéché	Ouara, Abougoudam, Djourf Al Ahmar, Assongha
17	Salamat	302,301	470,256	69,631	Am Timan	Barh-Azoum, Aboudeïa, Haraze-Mangueigne
18	Sila	387,461	591,300	36,745	Goz Beïda	Kimiti, Abdi, Tissi, Adé, Koukou-Angarana
20	Tandjilé	661,906	1,007,812	17,891	Laï	Tandjilé-Est, Tandjilé-Centre, Tandjilé-Ouest, Manga, Manbagué
21	Tibesti	25,483	52,626	135,896	Bardaï	Bardaï, Zouar, Wour, Aouzou, Emi-Koussi, Zoumri
5	Wadi Fira	508,383	792,394	56,362	Biltine	Biltine, Dar-Tama, Mégri, Iriba, Al-Biher, Dar-Alfawakih, Tiné
16	N'Djamena (capital)	951,418	1,434,592	408	N'Djamena	10 dawāʾir or arrondissements

== History ==
From independence in 1960 until 1999 it was divided into 14 préfectures. These were replaced in 1999 by 28 départements. The country was reorganized again in 2002 to produce 18 régions. In 2008, a further four régions were created, increasing the number to 22. Ennedi Region was split into Ennedi-Est and Ennedi-Ouest in 2012, producing 23 regions.

On 10 August 2018, a new ordinance (Note: Ordinance No. 038/PR/2018) divided Chad into 23 provinces, 95 departments, and 365 communes. The names of the former regions remained the same but were now called provinces.

=== Regions (2008–2012) ===
Regions of Chad 2008–2012 (numbered corresponding to table at left)

Key on map	Region	Capital
1	Batha	Ati
2	Chari-Baguirmi	Massenya
3	Hadjer-Lamis	Massakory
4	Wadi Fira	Biltine
5	Bahr el Gazel	Moussoro
6	Borkou	Faya-Largeau
7	Ennedi	Fada
8	Guéra	Mongo
9	Kanem	Mao
10	Lac	Bol
11	Logone Occidental	Moundou
12	Logone Oriental	Doba
13	Mandoul	Koumra
14	Mayo-Kebbi Est	Bongor
15	Mayo-Kebbi Ouest	Pala
16	Moyen-Chari	Sarh
17	Ouaddaï	Abéché
18	Salamat	Am Timan
19	Sila	Goz Beïda
20	Tandjilé	Laï
21	Tibesti	Bardaï
22	N'Djamena (capital)	N'Djamena

=== Regions (2002–2008) ===
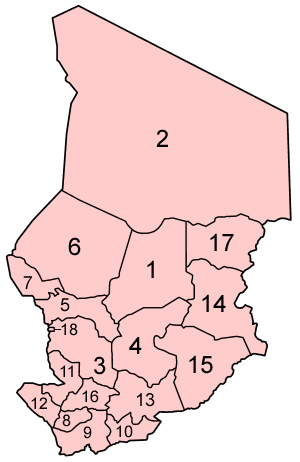
Regions of Chad 2002–2008 (numbered corresponding to table at left)

No.	Region	Capital	Departments
1	Batha	Ati	Batha Est, Batha Ouest, Fitri
2	Borkou-Ennedi-Tibesti	Faya-Largeau	Borkou, Ennedi Est, Ennedi Ouest, Tibesti
3	Chari-Baguirmi	Massenya	Baguirmi, Chari, Loug Chari
4	Guéra	Mongo	Barh Signaka, Guéra
5	Hadjer-Lamis	Massakory	Dababa, Dagana, Haraze Al Biar
6	Kanem	Mao	Barh El Gazel, Kanem
7	Lac	Bol	Mamdi, Wayi
8	Logone Occidental	Moundou	Dodjé, Lac Wey, Ngourkosso
9	Logone Oriental	Doba	La Nya Pendé, La Pendé, Monts de Lam, La Nya (1)
10	Mandoul	Koumra	Barh Sara, Mandoul Occidental, Mandoul Oriental
11	Mayo-Kebbi Est	Bongor	Mayo-Boneye, Kabbia, Mont d'Illi (1), Mayo Lemie (1)
12	Mayo-Kebbi Ouest	Pala	Lac Léré, Mayo-Dallah
13	Moyen-Chari	Sarh	Barh Köh, Grande Sido, Lac Iro
14	Ouaddaï	Abéché	Assoungha, Djourf Al Ahmar, Ouara, Sila
15	Salamat	Am Timan	Aboudeïa, Barh Azoum, Haraze Mangueigne
16	Tandjilé	Laï	Tandjilé Est, Tandjilé Ouest
17	Wadi Fira	Biltine	Biltine, Dar Tama, Kobé
18	N'Djamena (capital)	N'Djamena	10 arrondissements

(1) created in 2004

=== Regions created in 2008 ===
On February 19, 2008, four new regions were created:

- Former Borkou-Ennedi-Tibesti Region was divided into:
  - Borkou Region, from Borkou-Ennedi-Tibesti's former Borkou Department
  - Ennedi Region, from Borkou-Ennedi-Tibesti's former Ennedi Est and Ennedi Ouest departments
  - Tibesti Region, from Borkou-Ennedi-Tibesti's former Tibesti Department
- Split from the Kanem Region:
  - Barh El Gazel (Bahr El Gazel) region, from Kanem's former Barh El Gazel (Bahr El Gazel) department
- Split from Ouaddaï Region
  - Sila (Dar Sila) region, from Ouaddaï's former Sila and Djourf Al Ahmar (Djourouf Al Ahmar) departments

== See also ==
- ISO 3166-2:TD
- List of provinces of Chad by Human Development Index

== Other sources ==
- Décret n° 419/PR/MAT/02 (17 October 2002), concerning the creation of the régions
- Ordonnance n° 002/PR/08 portant restructuration de certaines collectivités territoriales décentralisées (19 February 2008), concerning the creation of new régions in 2008
- "Chad Map No. 3788 Rev. 8 United Nations / March 2009 (Colour)" (PDF). United Nations. 2009.
- "Zones de convergence humanitaire et développement en 2018" [Humanitarian and development convergence zones in 2018] (PDF). ReliefWeb. 2018.
