= Mayo-Kebbi Est =

Province of Chad

Coordinates: 10°16′N 15°22′E

Mayo-Kebbi Est مايو كيبي الشرقي Māyū Kībī ash-Sharqī
- Province
- Map of Chad showing Mayo-Kebbi Est
- Country: Chad
- Departments: 4
- Sub-prefectures: 18
- Regional capital: Bongor

Population (2009)
  - Total: 774,782
- Time zone: UTC+01:00 (WAT)

Mayo-Kebbi Est (Arabic: مايو كيبي الشرقي, romanised: Māyū Kībī ash-Sharqī) is one of the 23 provinces of Chad. Its capital is Bongor. It is composed of the northern areas of the former prefecture of Mayo-Kebbi (sub-prefectures of Bongor, Fianga and Gounou Gaya).

== Geography ==
The province borders Chari-Baguirmi Region to the north-east, Tandjilé Region to the south-east, Mayo-Kebbi Ouest Region to the south-west, and Cameroon to the west.

=== Settlements ===
The province's capital is Bongor; other major settlements include Djodo Gassa, Fianga, Gam, Gounou Gaya, Guélengdeng, Hollom Gamé, Katoa, Kéra, Kim, Koyom, Moulkou, Nanguigoto, Tikem and Youé. Lake Fianga and Lake Tikem are located in the region.

== Demographics ==
The region's population was 495,339 inhabitants in 1993 and 774,782 in the 2009 census. The main ethnolinguistic groups are the Fulani ,Bagirmi, Kanuri, Kera, Kim, Kwang, Majera, Marba, Masa, Mbara, Musgum, Musey, Ngeté-Herdé peoples, Tobanga and Tupuri.

== Subdivisions ==
The province of Mayo-Kebbi East is divided into four departments:

Department	Capital	Sub-prefectures
Kabbia	Gounou Gaya	Gounou Gaya, Berem, Djodo Gassa
Mayo-Lémié	Guélengdeng	Guélengdeng, Katoa, Nanguigoto
Mayo-Boneye	Bongor	Bongor, Kim, Koyom, Rigaza, Ngam, Moulkou, Samga
Mont d'Illi	Fianga	Fianga, Tikem, Hollom Game, Kéra, Youé
