= Logone Occidental (region) =

Region of Chad

Coordinates: 8°34′N 16°05′E

- Region
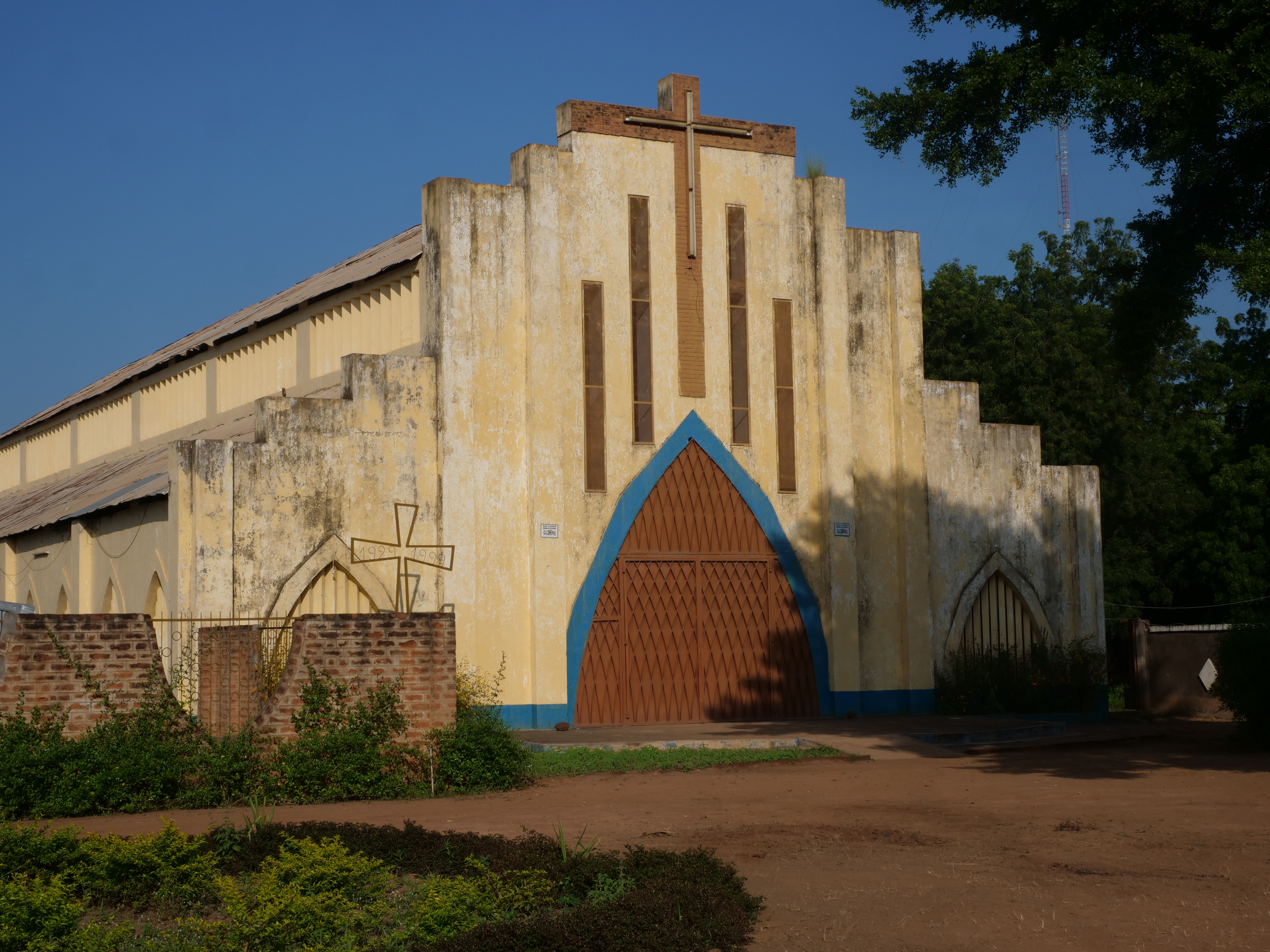
- The Sacred Heart Cathedral in Moundou

- Map of Chad showing Logone Occidental.
- Country: Chad
- Departments: 4
- Sub-prefectures: 21
- Regional capital: Moundou

Population (2009)
  - Total: 683,293
- Time zone: UTC+01:00 (WAT)

Logone Occidental is one of the 23 regions of Chad, which is located in the southwest of the country. Its capital is Moundou. It is coterminous with the former Logone Occidental Prefecture.

== Geography ==
The region borders Tandjilé Region to the north, Logone Oriental Region to the east and south, and Mayo-Kebbi Ouest Region to the west.

=== Settlements ===
Moundou is the regional capital and second largest city in Chad; other major settlements in the region include Bao, Bébalem, Béïnamar, Béïssa, Békiri, Béladjia, Bémangra, Bénoye, Bourou, Déli, Dodinda, Doguindi, Krim Krim, Laoukassy, Mbalkabra, Mballa Banyo, Ngondong and Saar Gogné.

== Demographics ==
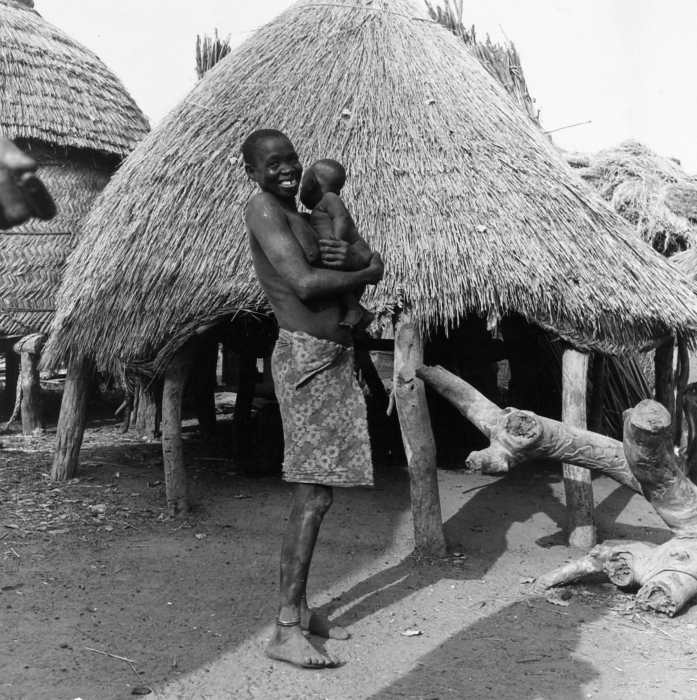
A woman in the province

As per the Chadian census of 2009, the total population in the region was 683,293, 51.50 per cent female. The average size of household as of 2009 was 5.20: 5.20 in rural households and 4.90 in urban areas. The number of households was 132,349: 99,255 in rural areas and 33,094 in urban areas. The number of nomads in the region was 54, 0.01 per cent of the population. There were 682,235 people residing in private households. There were 299,305 over 18 years of age: 138,679 male and 160,626 female. The sex ratio was 94.00 females for every hundred males. There were 683,239 sedentary staff, 6.30 of the population.

Sara groups such as the Laka and Ngambay represent more than the 90% of the territory's population.

== Administration ==
The region of Logone Occidental is divided into four departments, namely, Dodjé (capital Beinamar), Guéni (capital Krim Krim), Lac Wey (capital Moundou) and Ngourkosso (capital Benoye). As a part of decentralisation in February 2003, the country was administratively split into regions, departments, municipalities and rural communities. The prefectures, which were originally 14 in number, were re-designated into 17 regions. The regions are administered by Governors appointed by the President. Prefects, who originally held the responsibility of the 14 prefectures, still retained their titles and were responsible for the administration of smaller departments in each region. The members of local assemblies are elected every six years, while the executive organs are elected every three years. As of 2016, there are totally 23 regions in Chad, which are divided based on population and administrative convenience.
