= Lac Iro Department =

Department of Chad

- Location within Chad
- Coordinates: 10°6′30″N 19°25′19″E
- Country: Chad

Lac Iro is one of three departments in Moyen-Chari, a region of Chad. Its capital is Kyabé.

== Subdivisions ==
The departement of Lac Iro is subdivided into 9 sub-prefectures.

- Kyabé
- Bohobé
- Boum Kebbir
- Ngondeye
- Roro
- Baltoubaye
- Dindjebo
- Alako
- Singako

== See also ==
- Departments of Chad
