= Chari Department =

Department of Chari-Baguirmi, Chad

Coordinates: 12°03′N 15°18′E

Chari (Arabic: شاري) is one of 3 departments making up the region of Chari-Baguirmi in Chad. Its capital is Mandélia.

== sub-prefectures ==
Chari is divided into four sub-prefectures:

- Mandélia
- La Loumia
- Koundoul
- Linia
- Lougoun (Logone Gana)

== See also ==
- Departments of Chad
