= Cameroon–Chad border =

International border

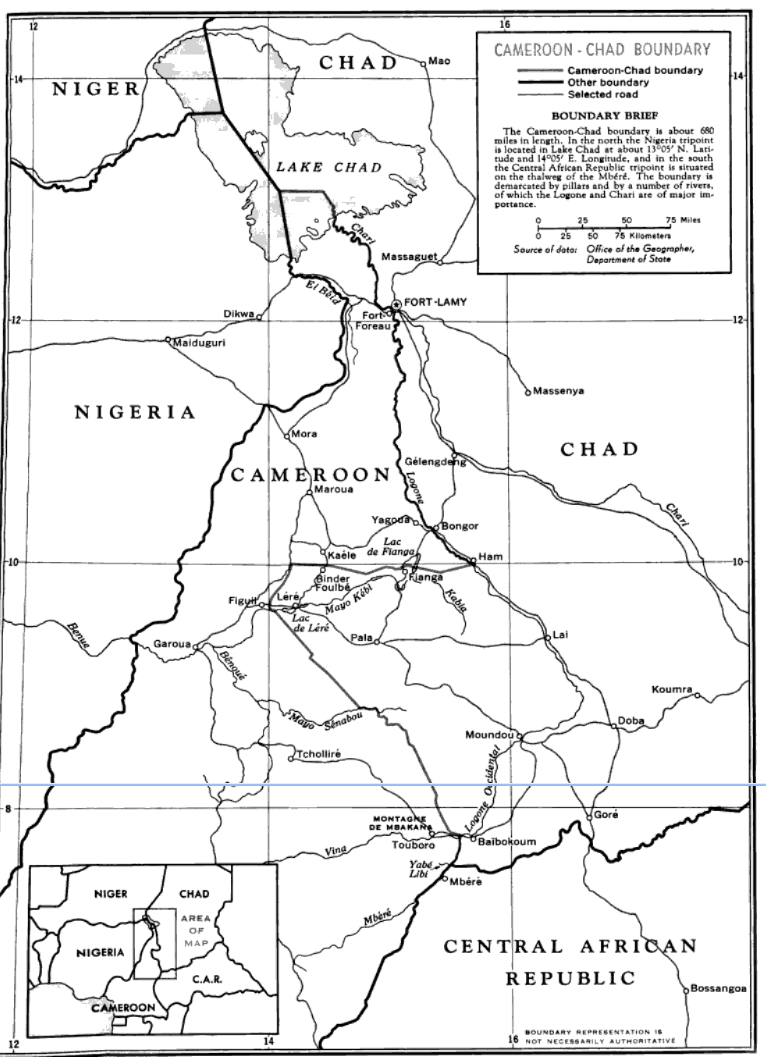
Map of the Cameroon-Chad border

The Cameroon–Chad border is 1,116 km (693 mi) in length and runs from the tripoint with Nigeria in the north, to the tripoint with the Central African Republic in the south.

== Description ==
The boundary begins in the north at the tripoint with Nigeria in the Lake Chad area. It then follows the Chari River southwards to the vicinity of Chad's capital N’Djamena, and then along the Logone River south to a point just north of the 10th parallel north. It then veers sharply to the west, following a series of straight lines for some 160 km (100 mi), then turning to the southwest for about 48 km (30 mi), and then turning to the south-east down to the CAR tripoint following various straight overland lines, small streams and, in the far south, the Mbere River.

== History ==
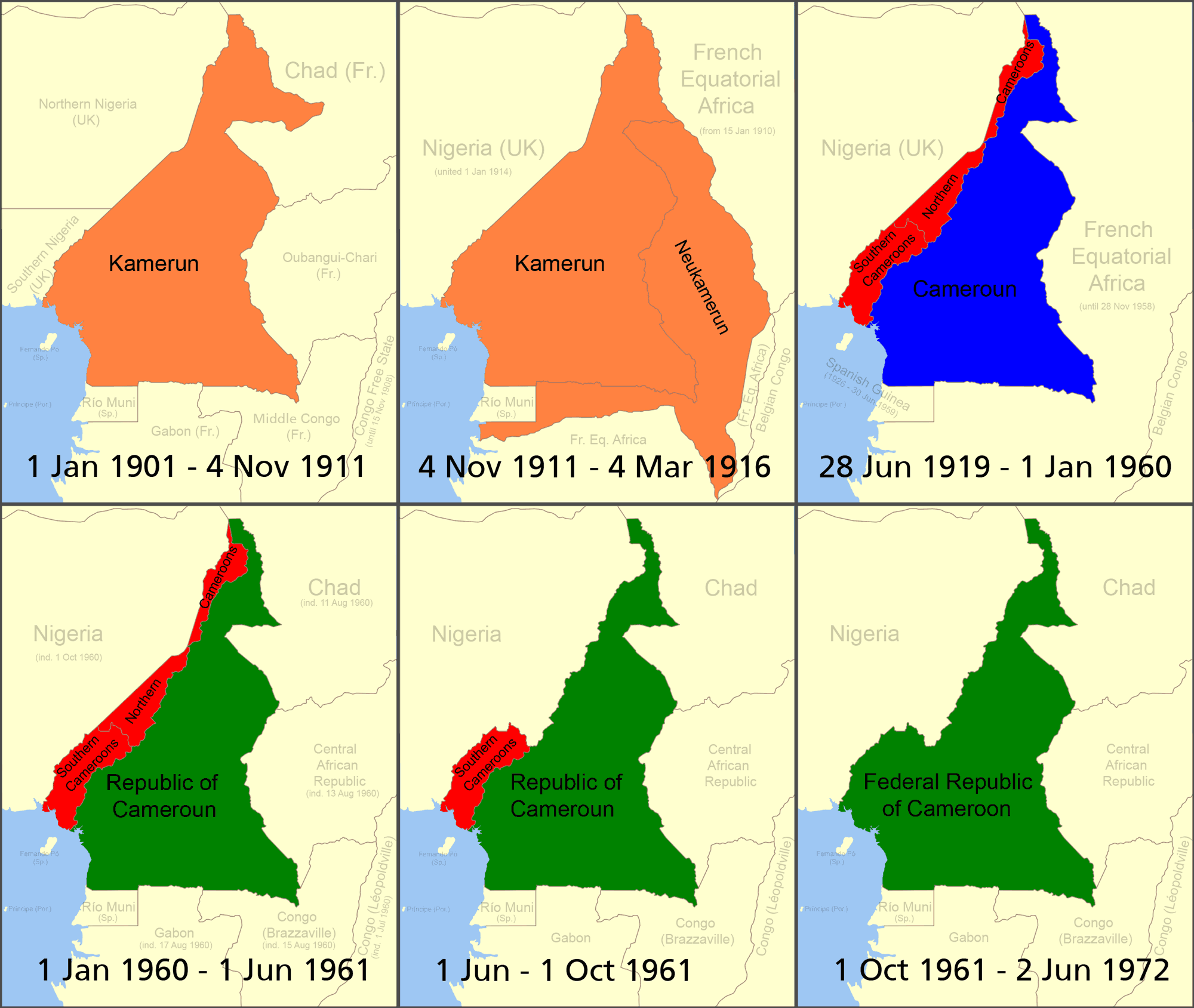
Maps of Cameroon 1901-1972 showing the changes to the Chadian border German Cameroon (Kamerun) British Cameroons French Cameroon (Cameroun) independent Cameroon (Cameroun)

The border first emerged during the Scramble for Africa, a period of intense competition between European powers in the later 19th century for territory and influence in Africa. The process culminated in the Berlin Conference of 1884, in which the European nations concerned agreed upon their respective territorial claims and the rules of engagements going forward. As a result of this France gained control of the upper valley of the Niger River (roughly equivalent to the areas of modern Mali and Niger), and also the lands explored by Pierre Savorgnan de Brazza for France in Central Africa (roughly equivalent to modern Gabon and Congo-Brazzaville). From these bases the French explored further into the interior, eventually linking the two areas following expeditions in April 1900 which met at Kousséri in the far north of modern Cameroon. These newly conquered regions were initially ruled as military territories. By 1903 within the AEF, the areas that now make up Gabon and Congo-Brazzaville (then called Moyen-Congo, or Middle Congo) were united as French Congo (later split), with areas further north organised into Ubangi-Shari (modern CAR) and Chad military territory; the latter two areas were merged in 1906 as Ubangi-Shari-Chad, and then de-merged in 1914. The two regions were later organised into the federal colonies of French West Africa (Afrique occidentale française, abbreviated AOF) and French Equatorial Africa (Afrique équatoriale française, AEF).

Germany had claimed Cameroon (Kamerun) in July 1884. France and Germany established the rough delimitation of their respective spheres of influence in the region in December 1885, with a more precise boundary agreed upon in 1894. A further delimitation occurred on 18 April 1908, which produced the modern Cameroon–Chad border as far as modern N'Djamena (note that the area now constituting roughly the northern half of Chad's Mayo-Kebbi Est Region was at that point part of German Cameroon). Following the Agadir Crisis of 1911, France and Germany signed the Treaty of Fez, in which Germany recognised French supremacy in Morocco in return for large territories in Central Africa. The latter were attached to their Cameroon colony as New Cameroon and included parts of what is now the far south-west of Chad; however France gained the area that is now the northern half of Mayo-Kebbi Est Region. When the First World War broke out in 1914, Britain and France invaded Cameroon and eventually defeated the Germans in 1916. Following the defeat of Germany in Europe in 1918-19 all of the areas ceded to Germany in 1911 were restored to France, thus finalising what are now the Cameroon's modern borders with Gabon, Congo-Brazzaville, CAR and Chad. On 22 June 1922 Cameroon became a League of Nations mandate, with the vast majority of the colony going to France, and smaller areas along the Nigerian border in the west to Britain. This mandate/trusteeship arrangement was affirmed by the UN in 1946. France gradually granted more political rights and representation for their African colonies, culminating in the granting of broad internal autonomy to each colony in 1958 within the framework of the French Community. Eventually, in January 1960 France granted Cameroon full independence, followed by Chad in August that year, and their mutual frontier became an international one between two independent states.

In recent years the border has been affected by the over spill from the Boko Haram insurgency in northeastern Nigeria.

== Settlements near the border ==
=== Cameroon ===
- Massaki
- Fadjawa
- Goulfey Gaa
- Kalawa
- Goulfey
- Cheloba
- Maltam
- Kousséri
- Dom
- Ardaf
- Golongini
- Guereme
- Kong Kong
- Makere
- Mombore
- Touboro

=== Chad ===
- Djimilo
- Mani
- Dougia
- Tom Marefin
- Abjogana
- Abkar
- Goudji
- N’Djamena
- Fianga
- Malfoudey
- Lale
- Binder
- Foulbe
- Mboursou
- Gegou
- Bongor
- Lamé
- Dari
- Oindaga
- Mbakeu
- Gamandjou
- Loumbogo
- Baïbokoum

== See also ==
border

- Cameroon–Central African Republic border
- Cameroon–Congo border
- Cameroon–Nigeria border
- Cameroon–Gabon border
- Cameroon–Niger border
- Cameroon–Chad border

relation

- Cameroon-Chad relations
- Cameroon-Nigeria relations
- Cameroon-Cango relations
- Cameroon-Centrel African Republic relations
- -
- Cameroon-Niger relations
- Cameroon-Gabon relations
- *******
