= Kimiti =

Department in Chad

- Department
- Location in Chad
- Country: Chad

Kimiti is a department of Sila Region in Chad. Its chief town is Goz Beida.

== Subdivisions ==
The department of Kimiti is divided into seven sub-prefectures:

- Goz Beida
- Koukou-Angarana
- Tissi
- Adé
- Mogororo
- Kerfi
- Moudeïna (or Madiouna)

== Administration ==
Prefects of Kimiti (since 2008)

- October 9, 2008: Rozzi Haliki

== See also ==
- Department of Chad
