= Nord Kanem =

Department of Kanem, Chad

- Department
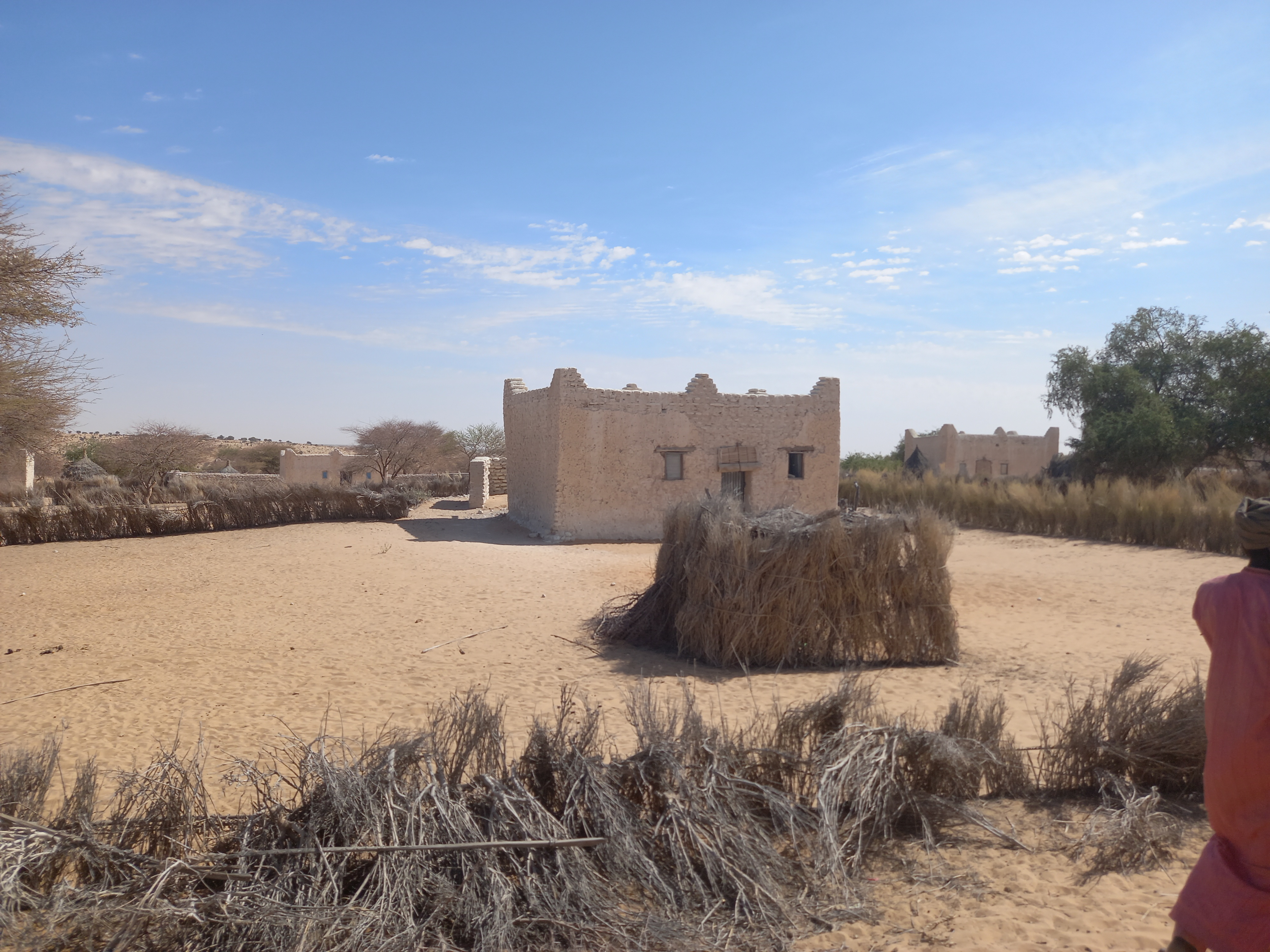

- Location in Chad
- Country: Chad

Nord Kanem is a department of Kanem Region in Chad. It was created by Ordinance No. 002 / PR / 08, on February 19, 2008. Its capital is Nokou.

== Subdivisions ==
The department of Nord Kanem is divided into four sub-prefectures:

- Nokou
- Rig Rig
- Ziguey
- Ntiona (also spelled Nthiona)

== Administration ==
Prefect of North Kanem (since 2008):

- Abdraman Kerim Gouri (since June 2015)
