= Loug Chari =

Department of Chari-Baguirmi, Chad

Loug Chari (Arabic: لوق شاري) is one of three departments in Chari-Baguirmi, a region of Chad. Its capital is Bousso.

== Sub-prefectures ==
Loug Chari is divided into four sub-prefectures:

- Bousso
- Kouno
- Bogomoro
- Bä Illi
- Mogo

== See also ==
- Departments of Chad
