= Massakory =

Department capital of Hadjer-Lamis, Chad

Massakory ماساكوري
- Location in Chad (Hadjer-Lamis highlighted)
- Coordinates: 13°00′N 15°44′E
- Country: Chad
- Region: Hadjer-Lamis
- Department: Dagana
- Sub-Prefecture: Massakory

Population (2008)
  - Total: 16,237
- Time zone: UTC+01:00 (WAT)

Massakory (Arabic: ماساكوري) is the capital of the Chadian region of Hadjer-Lamis and of the department of Dagana. The town was formerly in the prefecture of Fort-Lamy in the department of Bas-Chari.

== People ==
The territory around Massakory used to be ruled by the sultan of Ouaddaï. Two tribes dominate this region: the Dagana, nomadic herders, in the interior and the Kouri Kalé on the shores and islands of the western part of the lake. The Bulala, who live near Massagory, are said to be Arab in origin. They helped to found the Kanem kingdom, and helped to expel the Kanem royal family in the 13th century. They were later forced to move to the Yao region where they created a small Sultanate and settled into an agricultural lifestyle, although they are said to be good warriors.

The French colonialists created the post of Massakory in the Dagana territory in 1901. In 1925 the Bas-Chari region supplied 1,500 workers to work on the Congo-Ocean railway line. During the French colonial era, laws were enforced harshly. In the Massakory circonscription of about 30,000 people in 1932, two percent were in jail.

== Economy ==
The population of the town of Massakory was 11,344 in 1993, and had increased to 16,237 by 2008. In recent years the town and region has been "invaded" from the north by Libyan importers, as have other arid and semi-arid parts of northern Chad. The cattle market, once important, has steadily declined due to the advance of the desert and political instability in the area around the shrinking Lake Chad.

The town lies on the Nigeria/Niger corridor of Chad national highway system, running from N'Djamena to Bol. As of 2005, 77 kilometres (48 mi) between N'Djamena and Massaguet had been completed, while the remainder of the 249 kilometres (155 mi) corridor had yet to start due to lack of funding. By 2008 the paved road had reached Massakory. The road is intended to facilitate access to a new oil refinery that is being built at Djermaya to the north of the capital. Massakory Airport is a civilian airport with an unpaved runway of 3,500 feet (1,100 m) in length.
