= Borkou Yala =

Department of Borkou, Chad

- Department
- Location in Chad
- Country: Chad

Borkou Yala is a department of Borkou Region in Chad. It was created by Order No. 002 / PR / 08 of 19 February 2008. Its chief town is Kirdimi.

== Subdivisions ==
The department of Borkou Yala is divided into two sub-prefectures:

- Kirdimi
- Yarda.

== Administration ==
Administrator:

Prefects of Borkou Yala (since 2008):

- October 9, 2008: Choua Hemchi.

== See also ==
- Departments of Chad
