= Kouh-Est =

Department of Logone Oriental, Chad

- Department
- Location in Chad
- Country: Chad

Kouh-Est is a department of Logone Oriental Region in Chad. Its chief town is Bodo.

== Subdivisions ==
The Kouh-Est department is divided into 3 sub-prefectures:

- Bodo
- Bédjo
- Beti

== Administration ==
Prefect of Kouh-East

- October 9, 2008: Moregan Tarnodji Gosngar
- 2010: Sougour Mahamat Galama

== See also ==
- Departments of Chad
