= Zouarké =

Village in Chad

- Location in Chad (Tibesti Region highlighted)
- Coordinates: 20°25′10″N 16°13′32″E
- Country: Chad
- Region: Tibesti
- Department: Tibesti Ouest
- Sub-Prefecture: Zouar
- Time zone: UTC+01:00 (WAT)

Zouarké is a small village in the region of Tibesti, in Chad. It is located in Tibesti Mountains and it is a place of transition in the migratory flows and there are also gold mines nearby. On 20 June 2020, 44 gold miners (many in an irregular situation) and 21 Chadian soldiers died in clashes.
