= Mangalmé (town) =

Mangalmé مانقالمي
- City
- Location in Chad
- Coordinates: 12°21′17″N 19°36′50″E
- Country: Chad
- Region: Guéra
- Department: Mangalmé
- Sub-prefecture: Mangalmé
- Elevation: 1,716 ft (523 m)

Population (2009)
  - Total: 11,155
- Time zone: UTC+01:00 (WAT)

Mangalmé (Arabic: مانقالمي) is a city in the Guéra Region, Chad. It is the administrative center of the Mangalmé Department.

== Population ==
Population by years:

1993	2009
4,727	11,155
