= Baba Laddé =

Chadian rebel

- Birth name: Mahamat Abdoul Kadre Oumar
- Born: 21 July 1970 Gounou Gaya, Chad

Mahamat Abdoul Kadre Oumar, better known as Baba Laddé ("father of the bush" in the Fulani language used to designate the lion) is a Chadian Fulani rebel opposing the Chadian regime of Idriss Déby. He is sometimes referred to as Abdel Kader Baba Laddé.

== Biography ==
He was born on July 21, 1970, in Gounou Gaya in Mayo-Kebbi East and is of Fulani ethnicity.

Gendarme, he went into rebellion on October 15, 1998, by founding an armed group, the Popular Front for Recovery (PFR). He was imprisoned for the first time from November 1998 to September 1999. He then took refuge in Nigeria for several years. He joined Darfur with his PFR fighters from 2006 to 2008 alongside other rebel groups. For a few months, he was the Defense Commissioner of the Forces unies pour le changement (FUC) coalition, the coalition bringing together most of these groups. In 2008, he joined the Central African Republic with his men.

He was arrested by Chadian forces in Bangui in 2009 while taking part in negotiations, but imprisoned in N'Djamena, he managed to escape in 2010.

On December 23, 2011, in an article entitled "Central African Republic: Laddé, the man who wants to liberate the Peuls", the newspaper Jeune Afrique affirms that Baba Laddé wants to unite the Fulani movements with AQIM, the Polisario Front, the Tuaregs and the separatists of the Ogaden. However, it could be a disinformation campaign to discredit the Chadian opposition.

On January 23, 2012, Chadian and Central African armies launched an offensive against his bases located near Kaga-Bandoro, Kabo, Ouandago, Gondava (north-central Central African Republic), causing losses among PFR rebels, civilians and military from both countries. Baba Laddé and most of his men then left the area. The Guardian claims on March 7, 2012, that 16,000 people have been displaced as a result of these clashes, in May the United Nations mentions of 22,000 displaced.

According to researcher Roland Marchal, “What is different is the fact that he (Baba Laddé) was able to have a political discourse that was not confined within the borders of the Central African Republic, and within the localist claims. He developed an argument on the marginalization of Fulani Bororos pastoralists."

In an interview with Radio France Internationale on February 28, 2012, Baba Laddé affirms that his new objective is to overthrow the Chadian and Central African regimes. At that moment, the Romanian mercenary Horațiu Potra, a former legionary, offered to help him.

On March 16, 2012, Pierre Buyoya, former president of Burundi, affirmed “As for Baba Laddé, we have known for a long time that he is a bandit, a coupeur de route. I am surprised to see that he now has political demands. Is he manipulated? Maybe."

According to The Huffington Post of April 20, 2012, and Human Rights Watch, Baba Laddé and his men were on that date in the south-east of the Central African Republic, in the area where the Lord's Resistance Army is operating.

On June 1, 2012, Baba Laddé told Radio France Internationale that he was in South Sudan. He settled in Boro Madina (or Boro Medina) in the state of Western Bahr el Ghazal, in Raga county.

On July 23, 2012, Idriss Déby told Jeune Afrique that Baba Laddé "is a former Chadian gendarme who became a coupeur de route and trafficker in ivory, he is not a rebel, as some media claim, but a great bandit. This kind of character does not constitute a threat to Chad. For the Central African Republic, maybe."

On August 14, 2012, François Bozizé reaffirmed to Radio France Internationale that Baba Laddé was in South Sudan.

On September 2, 2012, Baba Laddé surrendered to the Central African authorities in the town of Ippy after announcing a few days before his return to the Central African Republic that he wanted to negotiate with the Chadian and Central African governments.

He was officially welcomed in Bangui on September 3, then a United Nations plane transferred him to N'Djamena on September 5. On September 8, the communiqué of agreement signifying the surrender of Baba Laddé was signed by the ministers of the interior and of defense of Chad and the Central African Republic.

On January 15, 2013, he was appointed advisor in charge of mission in the cabinet of the head of government of Chad. In conflict with the Prime Minister, he went into exile in Nigeria then in Niger in September 2013. He traveled to Benin then to Kenya where he met Jean-Francis Bozizé (son of François Bozizé) in Nairobi in November, then Joachim Kokaté in Niamey. After negotiations, the Nigerian Toubou Goukouni Zen and the Central African of Séléka Abakar Sabon brought Baba Laddé back to Chad at the end of January 2014.

On July 19, 2014, he was appointed prefect of the department of Grande Sido.

On November 24, 2014, like most prefects and sub-prefects of Chadian departments, Baba Laddé was dismissed from his post by decree. But having invested a lot in his department, the population of Maro is opposed to his eviction. A military convoy picks him up on December 1, but he escapes while his wife and bodyguard are beaten. He was then reported on December 5 in Bateldjé, in the Central African Republic between Kabo and Batangafo, where his men would have killed five civilians, a Central African minister affirmed on December 8 that Baba Laddé's presence in the Central African republic is for the moment only a rumor, but on December 10, the United Nations announces that the rebel leader was arrested on December 8 in Kabo by MINUSCA and transferred to Bangui. On the 11th, a former minister, Sheikh Aboulanwar Mahamat Djarma Khatir gave his support to Baba Laddé. He was extradited to Chad on January 2, 2015, and imprisoned in the prison of Koro Toro.

In the Central African crisis that began at the end of 2012, some of the RPF fighters joined the Séléka, mainly under the command of Ali Darassa, former right-hand man of Baba Laddé and now at the head of his own Fulani militia, the Union for Peace in the Central African Republic.

On December 6, 2018, the N'Djamena Court of Appeal sentenced him to 8 years' imprisonment.

After serving his sentence in Koro Toro, then at Amsinéné prison in N'Djamena, he was transferred in 2019 to Moussoro. His prison term ends on January 5, 2020, but he is not released until September 7, 2020.

On March 3, 2021, the Supreme Court rejected his candidacy for the 2021 presidential election, ruling that his party had not been duly recognized by the Ministry of Territorial Administration. The court also stated that the extract from the criminal record provided by the applicant did not comply with legal requirements.

In October 2021, Baba Laddé was appointed director of general intelligence of Chad, position he held for a few months. Arrested again on 26 December 2022, he was released on 17 February 2023.
