= Biltine Department =

Department of Wadi Fira, Chad

Biltine بيلتين
- Interactive map of Biltine
- Coordinates: 14°31′39″N 20°55′36″E
- Country: Chad
- Region: Wadi Fira
- Department: Biltine Department

Biltine (Arabic: بيلتين) is one of three departments in Wadi Fira, a region of Chad. Its capital is Biltine.

== Sub-prefectures ==
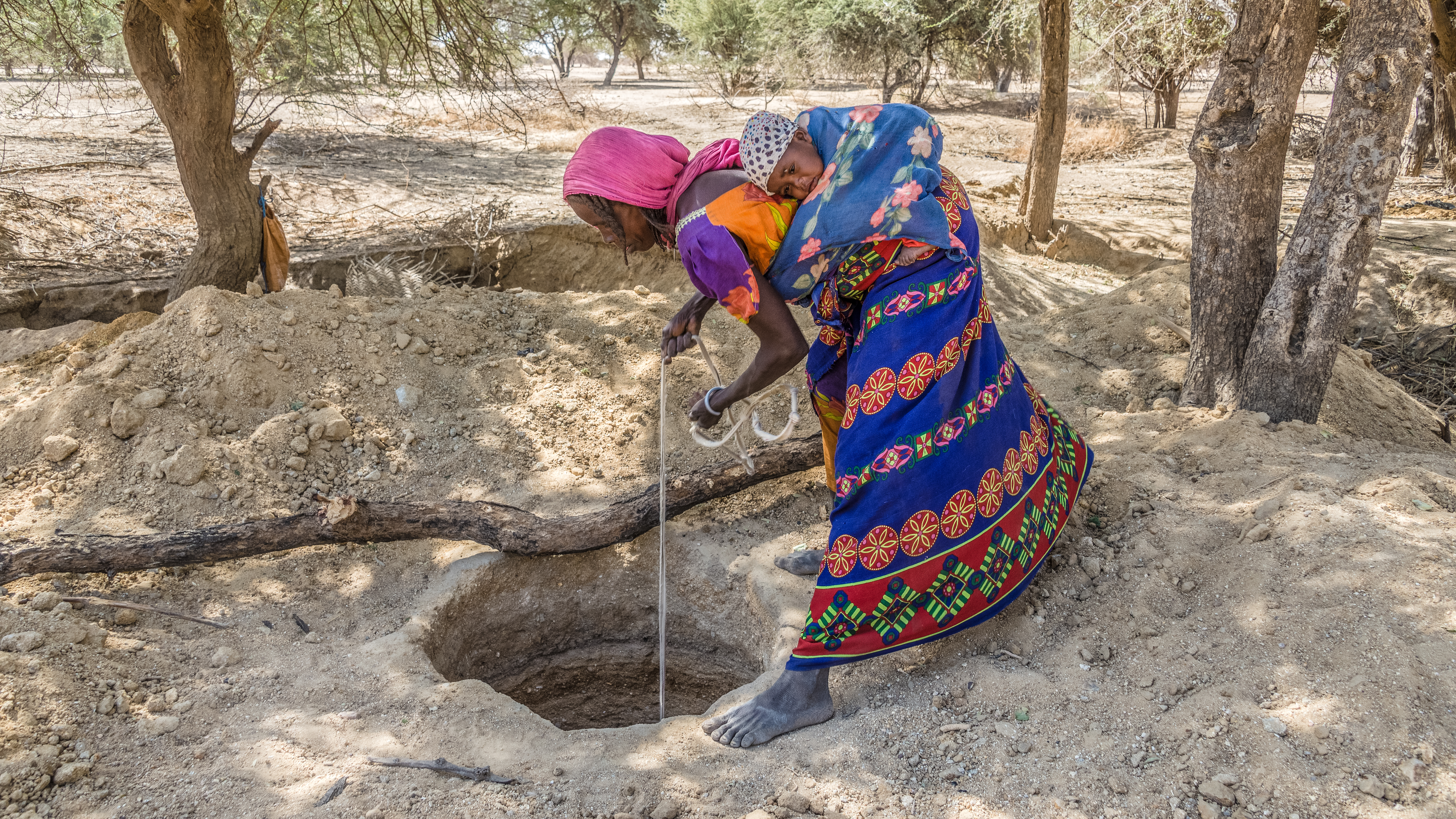
Between Arada and Angafal, a woman draws water from a well that her husband dug to a depth of 10 metres (33 ft).

Biltine is divided into four sub-prefectures:

- Biltine
- Am Zoer
- Arada
- Mata

== See also ==
- Regions of Chad
- Battle of Biltine
