= Dababa =

Department of Hadjer-Lamis, Chad

Coordinates: 12°22′48″N 17°03′36″E

Dababa (Arabic: دبابا) is one of three departments in Hadjer-Lamis, a region of Chad. Its capital is Bokoro.

== Subdivisions ==
The department of Dababa is divided into three sub-prefectures:

Sub-prefecture	Cantons
Moïto (Moyto)	Moïto (Moyto), Kouka, Nawala, Assala, Mayakne
Bokoro	Tania 1 Tania 2, Dadaba 1, Dadaba 2, Amloudouba
Gama (Ngama)	Yessie, Borno

== See also ==
- Departments of Chad
