= Djombo =

Djombo may refer to:

- Abkar Djombo, a sub-prefecture of Ouaddaï Region in Chad
- Haraze Djombo Kibet, sub-prefecture of Batha Region in Chad
- Haraze Djombo Kibit a sub-prefecture of Batha Region in Chad
- Henri Djombo (born 1952), Congolese politician
- Super Mama Djombo, a band from Guinea Bissau
