= Chad–Niger border =

International border

Chad–Niger

Characteristics
- Entities: Niger Chad
- Length: 1,196 kilometres (743 mi)

History
- Established: 1884; Berlin Conference
- Treaties: Berlin Conference

The Chad–Niger border is 1,196 km (743 mi) in length and runs from the tripoint with Libya in the north, to the tripoint with Nigeria in the south.

== Description ==
The border consists of a series of mostly straight lines. The northern section of the boundary begins near the Tibesti Mountains at the Libyan tripoint and proceeds roughly south-eastwards; the border here cuts across the Massif d'Afafi and the Erg of Bilma. The middle section of the boundary slants to the south-west slightly, with the southern section continuing in a much more pronounced south-westerly direction down to Lake Chad, whereupon a straight line veering to the south-east connects the border to the Nigerian tripoint. The majority of border lies within the Sahara Desert, with the more southerly sections lying within the Sahel. The border region is very sparsely populated, there being no towns or villages in its immediate vicinity.

== History ==
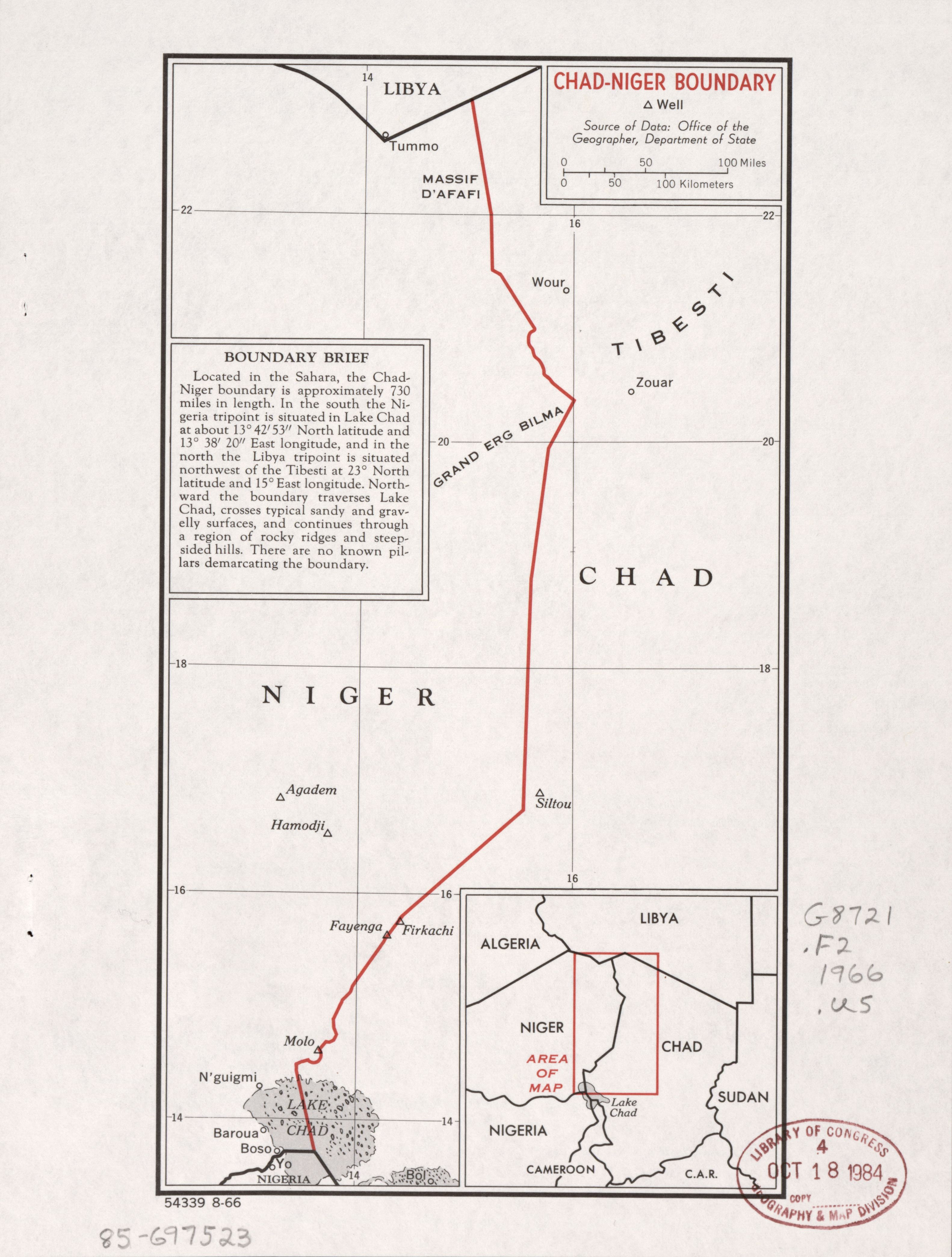
Map of the Chad-Niger border

The border first emerged during the Scramble for Africa, a period of intense competition between European powers in the later 19th century for territory and influence in Africa. The process culminated in the Berlin Conference of 1884, in which the European nations concerned agreed upon their respective territorial claims and the rules of engagements going forward. As a result of this France gained control of the upper valley of the Niger River (roughly equivalent to the areas of modern Mali and Niger), and also the lands explored by Pierre Savorgnan de Brazza for France in Central Africa (roughly equivalent to modern Gabon and Congo-Brazzaville). From these bases the French explored further into the interior, eventually linking the two areas following expeditions in April 1900 which met at Kousséri in the far north of modern Cameroon. These newly conquered regions were initially ruled as military territories, with the two areas later organised into the federal colonies of French West Africa (Afrique occidentale française, abbreviated AOF) and French Equatorial Africa (Afrique équatoriale française, AEF), the border between the two entities being the modern Chad-Niger boundary. The precise alignment of the boundary was determined later: the southern section was demarcated up to the 16th parallel north in February 1912 following a convention signed by the Commanding Officers of the Chad and Niger military territories, which was further modified following an on-the-ground assessment in 1939. On 18 March 1931 the northern segment of the border took its modern form with the signing of Memorandum No. 2268, which resulted in the transfer of the Tibesti Mountains from AOF to AEF (i.e. from Niger to Chad).

As the movement for decolonisation grew in the post-Second World War era, France gradually granted more political rights and representation for the constituent territories of the two federations, culminating in the granting of broad internal autonomy to each colony in 1958 within the framework of the French Community. Eventually, in August 1960, both Chad and Niger were granted full independence and their mutual frontier became an international one between two independent states.

In recent years the border has received renewed attention due to the growth in refugee and migrant movements, some of it organised by professional people smugglers. The situation has been exacerbated following the discovery of gold in the Tibesti Region of Chad in the late 2000s-early 2010, prompting a large influx of people to the area. On 9 June 2018 a clash between suspected people smugglers and the Nigerien military resulted in the deaths of two Nigerien soldiers. The far south of the border area has been affected by refugee movements caused by the ongoing Boko Haram insurgency in neighbouring Nigeria.

== Border crossings ==
There are road border crossings linking N'guigmi in Niger to the Chadian towns of Nokou and Rig Rig. However the unpaved route is extremely rough and is subject to banditry; most third party governments discourage travel in this region.
