= Mangalmé (department) =

Department of Guéra, Chad

- Department
- Location in Chad
- Country: Chad

Mangalmé is a department of Guéra Region in Chad. Its chief town is Mangalmé.

Mangalmé Department has a population of 156,910 (2016 survey) and 212 villages.

The majority of the population in Mangalmé is ethnic Mubi.

== Subdivisions ==
The department of Mangalmé is divided into 4 sub-prefectures:

- Mangalmé
- Bitchotchi
- Eref
- Kouka Margni

== Administration ==
Prefects of Mangalmé (since 2008)

- October 9, 2008: Mahamat Habib Taha

== See also ==
- Departments of Chad
