= Kouh-Ouest =

Department of Logone Oriental, Chad

- Department
- Location in Chad
- Country: Chad

Kouh-Ouest is a departments of Logone Oriental Region in Chad. Its chief town is Béboto.

== Subdivisions ==
The department of Kouh-Ouest is divided into 3 sub-prefectures:

- Béboto
- Baké
- Dobiti

== Administration ==
Prefect of Kouh West (since 2008)

- October 9, 2008: Djimalde N'Demra

== See also ==
- Departments of Chad
