= Dar Tama Department =

Department of Wadi Fira, Chad

Coordinates: 14.5121°N 22.0869°E

Dar Tama (Arabic: دار تاما) is one of three departments in Wadi Fira, a region of Chad. Its capital is Gueréda, 165 kilometres (100 mi) northeast of Abéché. The population consists primarily of non-Arab tribes. Dar Tama is the historical home of the Tama, who make up the majority of the population. The Zaghawa make up a significant minority and migrated during the Sahelian drought in the 1980s. Both are non-Arab tribes. Former Chadian president Idriss Déby is from the Zaghawa tribe.

On 26 April 2026 Zaghawa and Tama tribesmen clashed in Dar Tama killing 37 people. The clashes had emerged from a dispute over a waterwell and lead to several villages being burned.

== Sub-prefectures ==
Loug Chari is divided into four sub-prefectures:

- Guéréda
- Kolonga
- Sirim Birké (Serim Birké)

== See also ==
- Departments of Chad
