= Kanem (department) =

Department of Kanem, Chad

Coordinates: 14°07′10″N 15°18′48″E

Kanem (Arabic: كانم) is one of three departments which make up the region of Kanem in Chad. The capital is Mao.

The department is divided into 4 sub-prefectures:

- Kekedina
- Mao
- Melea
- Wadjigui

== See also ==
- Departments of Chad
