= Kanem =

Kanem may refer to:

- Kanem (historical region)
  - Kanem–Bornu Empire, which ruled Kanem in the 8th–14th centuries
- Kanem Prefecture, of former prefectures of Chad
- Kanem Region, a region of Chad created in 2002 from the former Prefecture of Kanem
- Kanem Department, one of three departments which make up the Kanem Region in Chad
- Kanem, a historic Chinese county which is now part of the Dongfang City in Hainan Province, China
