= Wayi =

Department of Lac, Chad

Coordinates: 13°38′34″N 15°22′07″E

Wayi (Arabic: وايي) is one of two departments in Lac, a region of Chad. Its capital is Ngouri.

The province of Lake Chad is affected by a high level of insecurity resulting from economic, geopolitical and ecological issues. A 6-month project of the NGO ACTED aims to rehabilitate the infrastructure of 11 Health Centres (HC) supported by ALIMA in the Ngouri and Doum-Doum sub-prefectures, in the department of Wayi. This action is part of a community-based approach, coordinated with ALIMA, to improve health infrastructures and WASH practices, and thus reduce the risk of infection. The target beneficiaries are 16,602 households (99,614 people), including 22 beneficiaries of masonry training, and 110 households benefiting from CfW activities.

In the department of Wayi at the end of July 2017, an inter-communal conflict occurred between two communities in Doum-Doum sub-prefecture. The conflict was over the use of a polder for agricultural purposes. Nine people were killed and the local authorities moved about 600 people to a village near Doum Doum. Mediation by the authorities is still ongoing. After consultation with the authorities, the NGO ACTED had to redirect its cash transfer activities to other areas. This situation has prevented providing assistance to 965 people initially targeted in the localities of Albout, Doum Doum and Malloum.

Wayi also has issues with food security. In a World Food Programme report in 2017, it was reported that food insecurity increased in 15 departments, with the largest percentage increases observed in the departments of Wayi (+73.9 percentage points) and Ouara (+42.7 percentage points).

== See also ==
- Departments of Chad
