= Adé, Chad =

Adé
- Location in Chad
- Coordinates: 12°40′01″N 021°54′00″E
- Country: Chad
- Region: Sila (Dar Sila)
- Department: Kimiti
- Time zone: UTC+1 (WAT)

Adé is a city in the Kimiti department of the Sila (or Dar Sila) region in southeastern Chad. It is on the eastern border with Sudan, 100 kilometres (62 miles) south of Adré.

Prior to 2008, Adé was part of the Ouaddaï Region's former Sila Department.

Adé lies in the traditional homelands of the Masalit near the border with the Dajo peoples (to the south and east). Adé was the scene of repeated fighting in 2005-2006 during the Chadian-Sudanese conflict. Adé was attacked several times including on 16 December 2005, and in January, June and July 2006.

The town is served by Adé Airport.
