= Abdi Department =

Coordinates: 12°48′0″N 21°18′0″E

Abdi is one of three departments in Ouaddaï, a region of Chad. Its capital is Abdi.

== See also ==
- Departments of Chad
