= Gabin Allambatnan =

Chadian footballer (born 2000)

Personal information
- Date of birth: 19 February 2000 (age 26)
- Place of birth: Massaguet, Chad
- Height: 2.02 m (6 ft 8 in)
- Position: Goalkeeper

Team information
- Current team: Coton Sport
- Number: 31

Senior career*
Years	Team	Apps	(Gls)
2017–2020	Foullah Edifice		
2021–	Coton Sport		

International career^{‡}
2019–	Chad	3	(0)
- * Club domestic league appearances and goals ‡ National team caps and goals as of 04:30, 29 October 2021 (UTC)

Gabin Allambatnan (born 19 February 2000) is a Chadian professional footballer who plays as a goalkeeper for Elite One club Coton Sport and the Chad national team.
