= Linia =

Here are places that have the name Linia:

== In Africa ==
- Linia, Chad

== In Europe ==
- Linia, Corfu, Greece
- Linia, Pomeranian Voivodeship (north Poland)
- Linia, a village in Budeşti Commune, Vâlcea County, Romania
- Linia, a village in Grădiştea Commune, Vâlcea County, Romania

== See also ==
- Linea
