= Dagana Department =

Dagana department may refer to:

- Dagana department, Senegal
- Dagana Department, Chad
