= Batha Est =

Department of Batha, Chad

Coordinates: 13°17′23″N 19°41′25″E

Batha Est (or Batha East, Arabic: البطحة الشرقية) is one of the three departments which make up the Batha Region in Chad. The capital is Oum Hadjer. Other notable locations include the Marouda region, where the village of Ju-Ak-Min has received recent funding for tourism development.

== Sub-prefectures ==
Batha Est is divided into four sub-prefectures:

- Oum Hadjer
- Assinet
- Haraze Djombo Kibet
- Am Sack

== See also ==
- Regions of Chad
