= Mamdi =

Mamdi may refer to:

- Mamdi Department, Chad
- Mamdi, Iraq
