= Dagana Department, Chad =

Department of Hadjer-Lamis, Chad

Coordinates: 12°59′43″N 15°43′57″E

Dagana (Arabic: داقانا) is one of three departments in Hadjer-Lamis, a region of Chad. Its capital is Massakory.

== Subdivisions ==
Dagana is divided into four sub-prefectures:

- Massakory
- Tourba
- Karal

== See also ==
- Departments of Chad
