= Petroleum Revenue Oversight and Control Committee =

The Petroleum Revenue Oversight and Control Committee (Collège de Contrôle et de Surveillance des Ressources Pétrolières) is a Chadian government watchdog committee in charge of overseeing the government's use of petrol reserves and revenues.

The committee is composed of:

- one magistrate of the Supreme Court
- one Deputy
- one Senator
- General Director of the Treasury
- National Director of the Bank of the Central African States (BEAC)
- four representatives from civil society (one from a local NGO, one from a trade union, one from a human rights organization, and one representative of the major religious groups of Chad, Muslim and Christian), to alternate.

Source: Article 6 and 7 of establishing decree.

The committee exercises control over the oil revenues from the oil fields at Kome, Miandoum and Bolobo.

== See also ==
- Nigerian National Petroleum Corporation
