= Ba Ili Airport =

Airport in Chari-Baguirmi, Chad

- IATA: none; ICAO: none

Summary
- Airport type: Public
- Serves: Ba Ili
- Location: Chad
- Elevation AMSL: 968 ft / 295 m
- Coordinates: 10°30′56.1″N 016°27′31.8″E

Map
- Location of Ba Ili Airport in Chad

Runways
Direction	Length		Surface
Direction	ft	m	Surface
03/21	3,120	951	Grass
- Source: Landings.com

Ba Ili Airport is a public use airport located near Ba Ili, Loug Chari, Chari-Baguirmi, Chad.

== See also ==
- List of airports in Chad
