= Laotegguelnodji Koumtog =

Chadian politician and diplomat

Laotegguelnodji Koumtog (born 1946) is a Chadian political figure and diplomat. He served in the government of Chad as Minister of Communication and Government Spokesman from 1994 to 1998 and as Permanent Representative to the United Nations from 2000 to 2005.

Koumtog was born in Pandzangue. He was Director of Trade, Customs, Financial and Monetary Affairs at the Secretariat of the Economic Community of Central African States from 1985 to 1994. He then served as Minister of Communication and Government Spokesman from 1994 to 1998; he was also Deputy Chief of Staff to President Idriss Déby at this time. Subsequently he was Assistant Director-General of the Chad Oil Transportation Company S.A. in Komé before being appointed as Permanent Representative to the UN in 2000. He presented his credentials as Permanent Representative on December 20, 2000.
