= Haraze Al Biar =

Department of Hadjer-Lamis, Chad

Haraze Al Biar حراز البيار
- Department
- Location within Chad
- Coordinates: 12°28′44″N 15°26′13″E
- Country: Chad
- Region: Hadjer-Lamis
- Subdivisions: Massaguet, Mani, N'Djamena Fara
- Capital: Massaguet

Haraze Al Biar (Arabic: حراز البيار) is one of three departments in Hadjer-Lamis, a region of Chad. Its capital is Massaguet.

== Subdivisions ==
Dagana is divided into four sub-prefectures:

- Massaguet
- Mani
- N'Djamena Fara

== Villages ==
- Adjodol

== See also ==
- Departments of Chad
