= Mayo Lemie =

Department of Chad

Mayo Lemie Mayo-Lémié
- Department
- Interactive map of Mayo Lemie
- Country: Chad
- Region: Mayo-Kebbi Est
- Seat: Guélengdeng

Mayo Lemie or Mayo-Lémié is one of four departments in Mayo-Kebbi Est, a region of Chad. Its capital is Guélengdeng.

== See also ==
- Departments of Chad
