= Kyabé Airport =

- IATA: none; ICAO: none

Summary
- Airport type: Public
- Serves: Kyabé
- Location: Chad
- Elevation AMSL: 1,240 ft / 378 m
- Coordinates: 09°26′50.9″N 018°55′40.1″E

Map
- Location of Kyabé Airport in Chad

Runways
Direction	Length		Surface
Direction	ft	m	Surface
08/26	5,900	1,798	Dirt
- Source: Landings.com

Kyabé Airport is a public use airport located near Kyabé, Moyen-Chari, Chad.

== See also ==
- List of airports in Chad
