= Bébédjia =

Bébédjia بيبيدخيا
- Town
- Location in Chad
- Coordinates: 8°39′50″N 16°34′32″E
- Country: Chad
- Region: Logone Oriental
- Department: Nya
- Sub-prefecture: Bébédjia
- Destroyed: 2007

Population
  - Total: 0

Bébédjia was a town in Logone Oriental Prefecture (now Logone Oriental Region) in Chad which was hit by a tornado on May 9, 2007, killing 14 people and injuring over 100.
