= Guéréda =

Guéréda غيريدا
- Town
- Location in Chad
- Coordinates: 14°30′30″N 22°05′13″E
- Country: Chad
- Region: Wadi Fira
- Department: Dar Tama
- Sub-Prefecture: Guéréda
- Elevation: 3,246 ft (989 m)
- Time zone: UTC+01:00 (WAT)

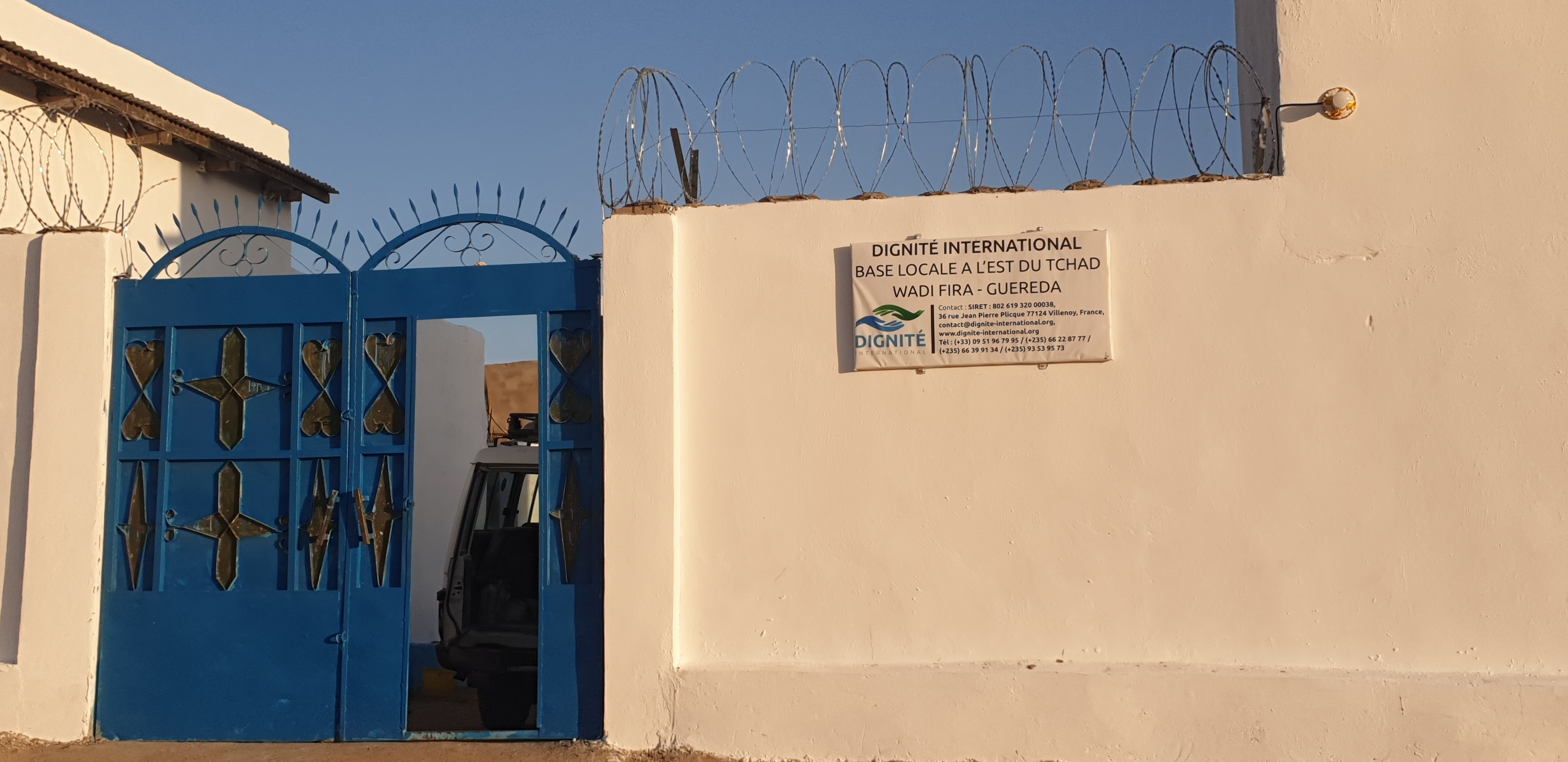

Guéréda (Arabic: غيريدا, romanized: Ḡīrīdā) is a town in the Wadi Fira Region, Chad. It is located at around 14°30′30″N 22°5′13″E.

About 60% of Guéréda residents are Tama but people also come from up to 60 km around.

Guéréda was the site of fighting between the Chadian army and the Rally of Democratic Forces (RaFD) in early December 2006. On December 1, eleven people were killed and 82 injured in the fighting. On December 13, the FUC took control of the streets of Guéréda, ending almost twenty years of control by the Zaghawa minority. Power dynamics were reversed and FUC rebels organized mass interrogations of civilians who were questioned about their ethnic origins. Zaghawa civilians accused of anti-Tama sentiments were arrested.

Seventeen expatriate humanitarian staff are located in Guéréda near the large refugee camps at Mile and Kounoungo, where 30,000 Sudanese refugees from the Darfur conflict are located.

The town is served by Guéréda Airport.
