= Kyabé =

Kyabé كيابي
- Location in Chad
- Coordinates: 9°27′05″N 18°56′41″E
- Country: Chad
- Region: Moyen-Chari Region
- Department: Lac Iro Department
- Sub-Prefecture: Kyabé
- Elevation: 1,204 ft (367 m)

Population (2009)
  - Total: 15,960
- Time zone: UTC+01:00 (WAT)

Kyabé (Arabic: كيابي) is a city in the Moyen-Chari Region, Chad. It is the administrative center of the Lac Iro Department. There is an airport with the name of the city, Kyabé Airport.

== Population ==
Population by years:

1993	2009
11,912	15,960
