= Bahr el Gazel Nord =

Department of Bahr el Gazel, Chad

Barh El Gazel Nord is one of two departments of Chad in Barh El Gazel, a region of Chad. Its capital is Salal.

== See also ==
- Departments of Chad
