= Popular Front for Recovery =

Militia from Chad

- Front Populaire pour le Redressement
- Leader: General Abdel Kader Baba-Laddé
- Dates active: 2008–present
- Active regions: Nana-Grébizi, Ouham, Ouham-Pende prefectures
- Wars: Central African Republic Bush War

The Popular Front for Recovery (French: Front Populaire pour le Redressement; FPR) is a militia from Chad. It destabilized northern Central African Republic from 2008 to 2012.

The leader of the FPR was General Abdel Kader Baba-Laddé.

== History ==
The FPR has signed ceasefires on several occasions, only to return to fighting soon after, in a cycle that is typical of conflicts in the region. In January 2014 FPR took control of Bang, town on border with Chad and Cameroon, however they were ousted by Revolution and Justice month later. On 8 December 2014 group leader, Baba-Laddé was arrested near Kabo

In August 2023, FPR declared its intention to fight alongside the Front for Change and Concord in Chad against the Chadian government.
