= Tibesti Ouest =

- Department
- Location in Chad
- Country: Chad

Tibesti Ouest is a department of Tibesti Region in Chad. It was created by Ordinance No. 002 / PR / 08 of 19 February 2008. Its seat is Zouar.

== Subdivisions ==
The department of Tibesti West is divided into three sub-prefectures:

- Zouar
- Wour
- Goubonne

== Administration ==
Prefect of Tibesti Ouest (since 2008)

- October 9, 2008: Galmaye Abdallah
- November 24, 2014 Mahamat Seid Haggar
