= Guélengdeng =

Guélengdeng جليندينغ
- City
- Location in Chad
- Coordinates: 10°55′06″N 15°32′55″E
- Country: Chad
- Region: Mayo-Kebbi Est
- Department: Mayo Lemie
- Sub-Prefecture: Guélengdeng
- Elevation: 965 ft (294 m)

Population (2009)
  - Total: 16,320
- Time zone: UTC+01:00 (WAT)

Guélengdeng (Arabic: جليندينغ) is a city in the Mayo-Kebbi Est Region, Chad. It is the administrative center of Mayo Lemie.

== Population ==
Population by years:

| 1993 | 2009 |
|---|---|
| 8,379 | 16,320 |
