= Mayo-Dallah =

Department of Chad

Coordinates: 9.362195°N 14.911564°E

Mayo-Dallah is one of two departments in Mayo-Kebbi Ouest, a region of Chad. Its capital is Pala.

== See also ==
- Departments of Chad
