= Bol-Bérim Airport =

Airport in Lac, Chad

Bol-Berim Airport
- IATA: OTC; ICAO: FTTL

Summary
- Airport type: Public
- Serves: Bol
- Location: Chad
- Elevation AMSL: 958 ft / 292 m
- Coordinates: 13°26′36.7″N 014°44′21.3″E

Map
- Location of Bol-Berim Airport in Chad

Runways
Direction	Length		Surface
Direction	ft	m	Surface
05/23	2,620	799	Asphalt
- Source: Landings.com

Bol-Berim Airport (IATA: OTC, ICAO: FTTL) is a public use airport located near Bol, Lac, Chad.

== See also ==
- List of airports in Chad
