= Barh Azoum =

Coordinates: 11°03′00″N 20°16′48″E

Barh Azoum is one of three departments in Salamat, a region of Chad. Its capital is Am Timan.

== See also ==
- Departments of Chad
