= Guéréda Airport =

Airport in Wadi Fira, Chad

- IATA: none; ICAO: none

Summary
- Airport type: Public
- Serves: Guéréda
- Location: Chad
- Elevation AMSL: 3,232 ft / 985 m
- Coordinates: 14°33′49.5″N 022°4′21.7″E

Map
- Location of Guéréda Airport in Chad

Runways
Direction	Length		Surface
Direction	ft	m	Surface
07/25	3,770	1,149	Grass
- Source: Landings.com

Guéréda Airport is a public use airport located near Guéréda, Wadi Fira, Chad.

== See also ==
- List of airports in Chad
