= Tibesti Est =

- Department
- Location in Chad
- Country: Chad

Tibesti Est is a department of Tibesti Region in Chad. It was created by Ordinance No. 002 / PR / 08 of 19 February 2008. Its chief town is Bardai.

== Subdivisions ==
The department of Tibesti Est is divided into four sub-prefectures:

- Bardaï
- Zoumri
- Aozou
- Yebbibou

== Administration ==
Administrators:

Prefect of Tibesti Est (since 2008)

- October 9, 2008: Taher Barkai
