= La Nya Department =

Department of Logone Oriental, Chad

Coordinates: 8°41′N 16°34′E

La Nya or Nya is one of six departments in Logone Oriental, a region of Chad. Its capital is Bébédjia.

== See also ==
- Departments of Chad
