= Guéni =

Department of Logone Occidental, Chad

- Department
- Location in Chad
- Country: Chad

Guéni is a department of Logone Occidental Region in Chad. Its chief town is Krim Krim.

== Subdivisions ==
The department of Guéni is divided into four sub-prefectures:

- Krim Krim
- Bao
- Bemangra
- Doguindi

== Administration ==
Prefects of Guéni:

- October 9, 2008: Adam Adami Youssouf

== See also ==
- Departments of Chad
