= Salal, Chad =

Salal سالل
- Town
- Location in Chad
- Coordinates: 14°50′24″N 17°13′11″E
- Country: Chad
- Region: Bahr el Gazel
- Department: Bahr el Gazel Nord
- Sub-Prefecture: Salal
- Elevation: 902 ft (275 m)

Population (2009)
  - Total: 4,996
- Time zone: UTC+01:00 (WAT)

Salal (Arabic: سالل) is a town in Chad, lying 380 kilometres (240 mi) north of N'Djamena on the road to Faya-Largeau. Salal is the second largest city after Moussoro in Bahr el Gazel Region.

A garrison was once at Salal during the conflict with Libya in 1978. On 15 April 1978, FROLINAT forces, led by Goukouni Oueddei, took Salal before marching south to the Chadian capital, N'Djamena.

== Demographics ==
Year	Population
1993	471
2009	4,996
