= Dourbali =

- Location in Chad
- Coordinates: 11°48′18″N 15°51′53″E
- Country: Chad
- Region: Chari-Baguirmi Region
- Department: Baguirmi
- Sub-Prefecture: Dourbali

Population (2005)
  - Total: 17,682
- Time zone: +1

Dourbali is a city in Chad, located in the region of Chari-Baguirmi.
