= Monts de Lam =

Department of Logone Oriental, Chad

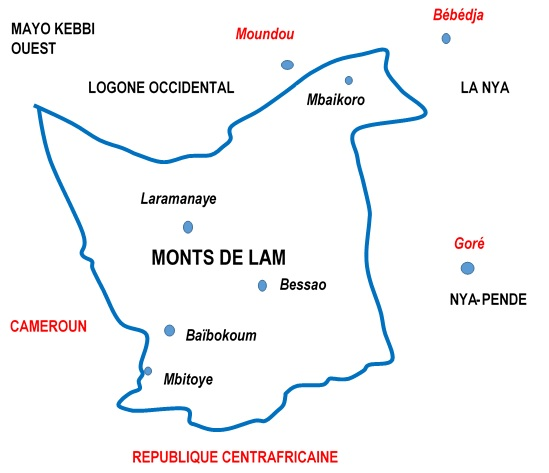
Map of Monts de Lam

Monts de Lam is one of six departments in Logone Oriental, a region of Chad. Its capital city is Baïbokoum.

== See also ==
- Departments of Chad
