= Bousso =

Bousso بوسو
- Location in Chad
- Coordinates: 10°28′57″N 16°42′58″E
- Country: Chad
- Region: Chari-Baguirmi Region
- Department: Loug-Chari
- Sub-Prefecture: Bousso

Population (2008)
  - Total: 14,286
- Time zone: +1

Bousso (Arabic: بوسو) is a city in Chari-Baguirmi Region, Chad. It is located at around 10°28′57″N 16°42′58″E. The town is served by Bousso Airport.

== Demographics ==
Year	Population
1993	9 981
2008	14 286
