= Mata, Chad =

Mata
- Location in Chad
- Coordinates: 14°02′37″N 21°09′40″E
- Country: Chad
- Region: Wadi Fira
- Department: Biltine
- Sub-Prefecture: Mata

Population (2009)
  - Total: 13,739
- Time zone: +1

Mata is a settlement in the Wadi Fira region, situated 686 km (426 mi) northeast of N'Djamena. In 2009, the population of Mata was 13,739, which included 6,217 males and 7,522 females. Mata is classified by Köppen-Geiger climate classification system as hot desert (BWh).
