= Am Timan =

Am Timan أم تيمان
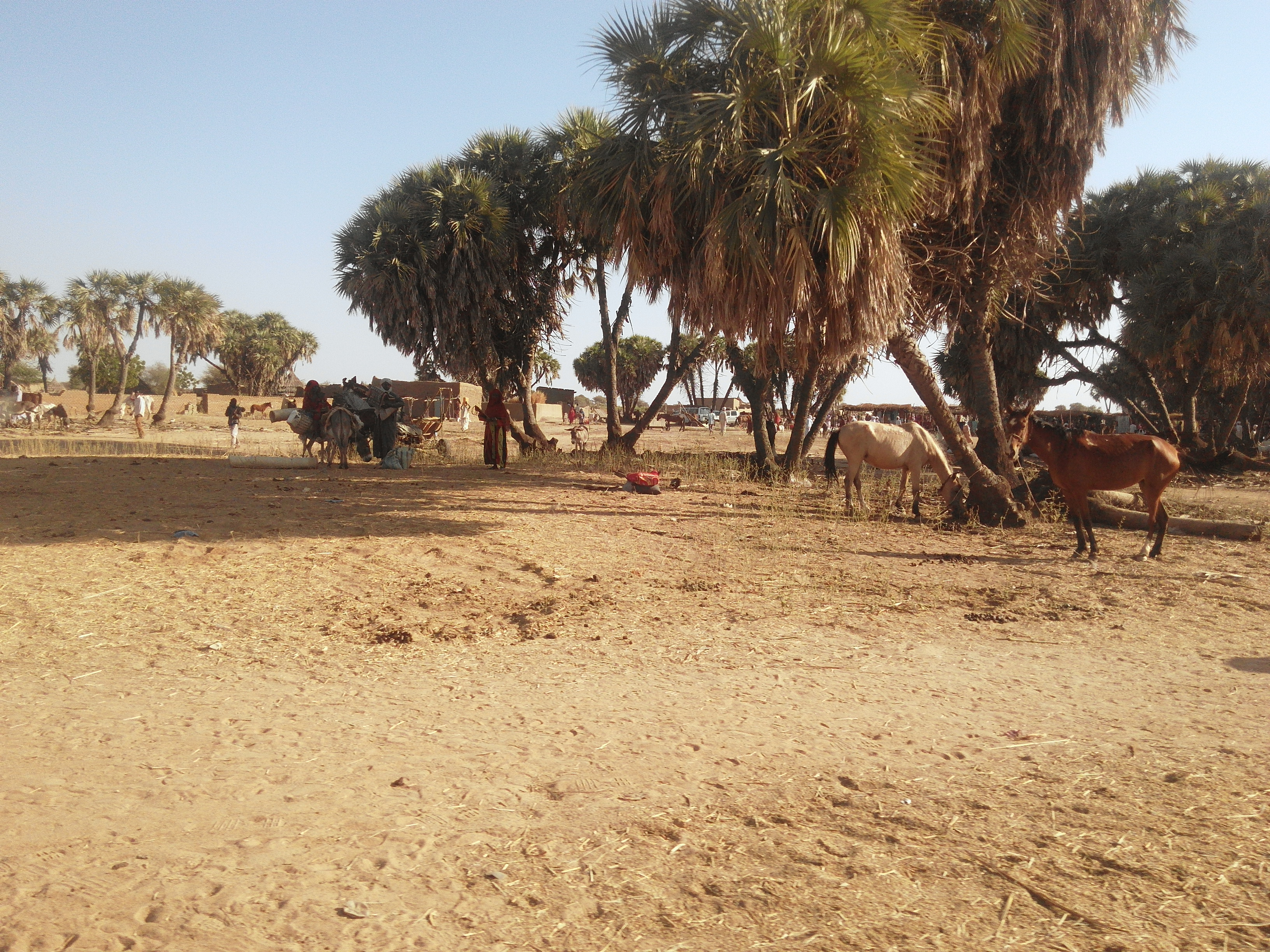
- Market view of Am Timan

- Location in Chad
- Coordinates: 11°2′N 20°17′E
- Country: Chad
- Region: Salamat Region
- Department: Barh Azoum
- Sub-Prefecture: Am Timan
- Elevation: 407 m (1,335 ft)

Population (2012)
  - Total: 38,261
- Time zone: + 1

Am Timan (Arabic: أم تيمان, ʾUmm Tīmān) is a city in Chad and is the capital of the region of Salamat. Most of economy comes from Salamat region such as fish, vegetables and anomalies meat, etc. In Arabic, Am Timan means "mother of twins". As the capital of the prefecture, it has the area of many towns and villages around it, including the Zakouma National Park. The city has no university but there are schools and colleges, and a clinic, and hosts a large market day and holiday celebrations.

During the conflict period, a cotton plantation and processing plant just outside the city were destroyed. The city's sand airport was upgraded by the French Foreign Legion in 1971 to allow military air transports to supply the anti-rebel effort. At the time, the only practical way in or out of the city was by air.

Since the dry season lasts for about seven months of the year, water becomes a problem as the dry season progresses. Aquifers are accessed by digging deeper and deeper into the bed of the Bahr Salamat (river). The river starts flowing with the onset of rain, however, and the children enjoy swimming in it.

== History ==
=== October 2006 ===
On 23 October 2006, the city was claimed to be captured by Union of Forces for Democracy, the main Chadian rebel group. The government of Chad disputed this claim.

== Climate ==
The climate is semi arid (Koppen: BSh), bordering on a tropical savanna climate (Koppen: Aw), with almost all rainfall occurring during the summer months.

Climate data for Am Timan
Month	Jan	Feb	Mar	Apr	May	Jun	Jul	Aug	Sep	Oct	Nov	Dec	Year
Average precipitation mm (inches)	0.0 (0.0)	0.0 (0.0)	5.1 (0.20)	16.2 (0.64)	51.6 (2.03)	117.8 (4.64)	202.7 (7.98)	248.5 (9.78)	121.1 (4.77)	33.1 (1.30)	1.6 (0.06)	0.0 (0.0)	797.7 (31.4)
Average relative humidity (%)	29	24	27	37	50	64	75	80	78	68	47	35	51
Mean monthly sunshine hours	297.6	274.4	285.2	276	275.9	249	207.7	204.6	222	275.9	288	300.7	3,157
Mean daily sunshine hours	9.6	9.8	9.2	9.2	8.9	8.3	6.7	6.6	7.4	8.9	9.6	9.7	8.7
Source: NOAA

== Demographics ==
Year	Population
1993	21 269
2008	30 443

== Health ==
In 2018, a lay first responder (LFR) program was launched to provide prehospital emergency medical services for residents. It was created by international collaborators from LFR International, Washington University in St. Louis, Red Cross of Chad, and the University of Michigan Medical School by training local motorcycle taxi drivers to provide first aid and transport.
