= Oum Hadjer =

Oum Hadjer أم هاجر
- Location in Chad
- Coordinates: 13°17′40″N 19°41′29″E
- Country: Chad
- Region: Batha
- Department: Batha Est
- Sub-Prefecture: Oum Hadjer (أم هاجر)
- Elevation: 1,180 ft (360 m)
- Time zone: +1

Oum Hadjer (Arabic: أم هاجر) is a small city in Chad, and the capital of Batha Est Department. It straddles the ephemeral Batha River, lies on the main road between Khartoum and N'Djamena, and has a small airport.

Strategically located, it has been contested by government and rebel forces in 1982, 1990, and January 2008.

Oum Hadjer is also the name of the Sub-Prefecture that the city is within. The population of the entire Oum Hadjer Sub-Prefecture is about 14,500.

The town is served by Oum Hadjer Airport.
