= Pala, Chad =

Pala بالا
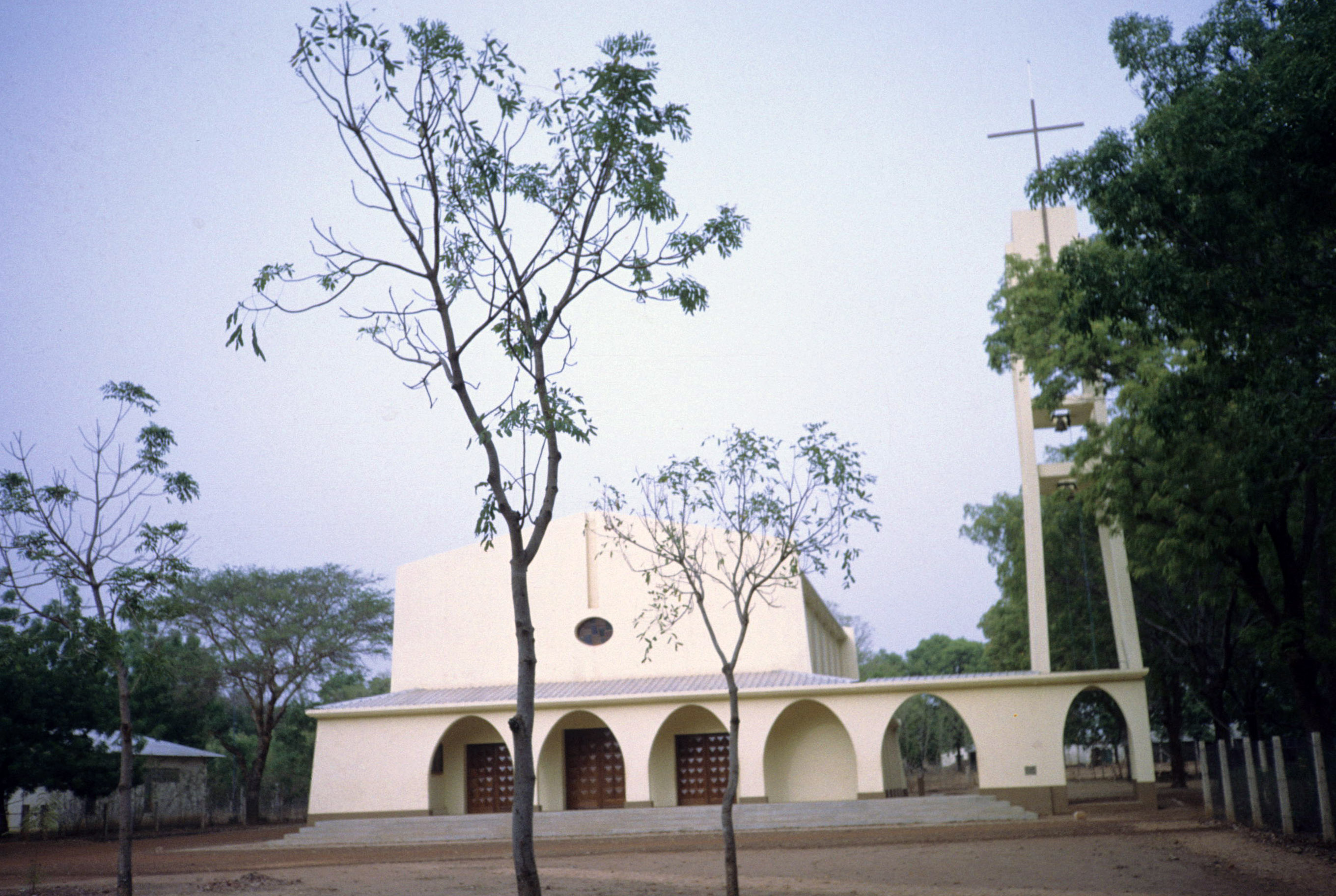
- Cathedral in Pala

- Location in Chad (Mayo-Kebbi Ouest highlighted)
- Coordinates: 09°21′45″N 014°54′38″E
- Country: Chad
- Region: Mayo-Kebbi Ouest
- Department: Mayo-Dallah
- Sub-Prefecture: Pala
- Elevation: 457 m (1,499 ft)

Population (2012)
  - Total: 40,202
- Time zone: +1

Pala (Arabic: بالا) is a town in Chad and the capital of the region of Mayo-Kebbi Ouest. The Fula language is spoken in the area. The Roman Catholic bishopric of Pala served Mayo-Kebbi Prefecture, in 1970, Pala included 116,000 of Chad's 160,000 Catholics.

It has the country's first gold mine, opened by the South Korean company Afko. However, cotton picking is the main industry in the area.

The town is served by Pala Airport.

== Demographics ==
Year	Population
1993	26,115
2008	37,380
