= Mao, Chad =

Mao مؤ
- City
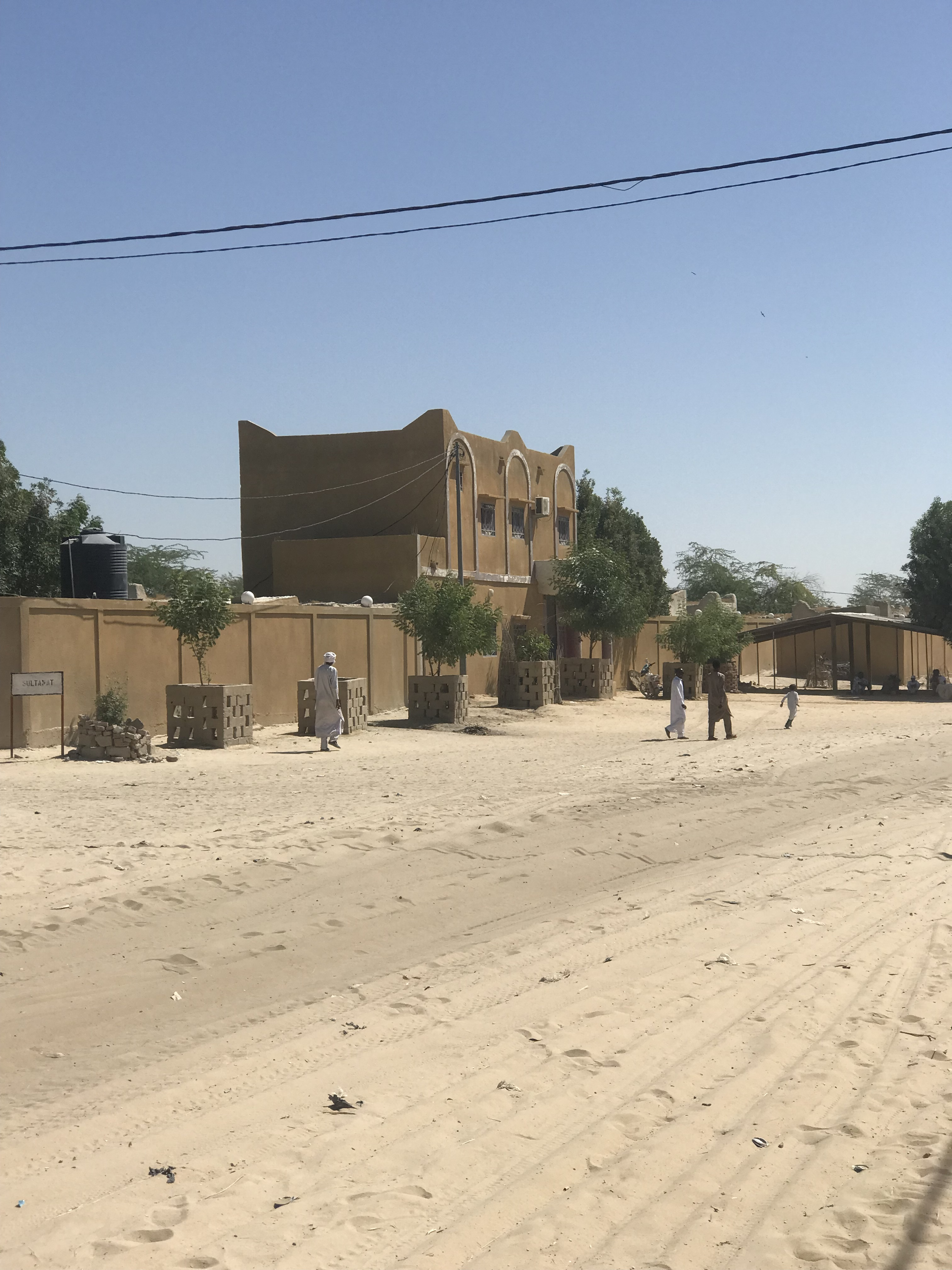
- Oasis town of Mao

- Location in Chad
- Coordinates: 14°07′10″N 15°18′48″E
- Country: Chad
- Region: Kanem
- Department: Kanem
- Sub-Prefecture: Mao
- Elevation: 1,112 ft (339 m)

Population (2019)
  - Total: 50,000
- Time zone: UTC+01:00 (WAT)

Mao (Arabic: مؤ) is a city in Chad, the capital of the Kanem Region and of the department also named Kanem. It is the 16th most populous city in Chad, and is located 226 km (140 mi) north-northeast of N'Djamena.

On the border of the Sahara, Mao's geography is marked by sand dunes and sparse vegetation. A large majority of Mao's residents are Muslim. There are two Christian churches (one Catholic and one Protestant) in Mao.

As in other Chadian regions, Mao is ruled by both a traditional Sultan and by central government officials. The Sultan of Kanem, who resides in Mao, is the traditional chief of the Kanembou people. Moves toward decentralisation have been stymied by the complex and sometimes tense relationships between traditional rulers in Chad and national authorities.

== History ==
During the rule of ‘Umar b. Idris (c. 1619 - 39) the Alifa of Mao was established in Kanem as a semi-autonomous vassal to take care of the eastern marches of the state.

Mao was later created in 1898 by Sultan Ali, brother of Sultan Djourab who was assassinated by the Fezzans and other accomplices. Since 1900, Mao has been the effective administrative center of the north.

On 18 July 2010, the Sultan of Kanem, Alifa Ali Zezerti, died in hospital in N'Djamena aged 83, from complications from a heart attack. He was the 39th ruler of the Kanem dynasty, and had reigned since 1947. He was buried in Mao. His predecessor, Sultan Zezerti, had died on 26 September 1947, having ruled since 1925. His son was elected as Sultan in a by-election without competition.

In October 2013, riots broke out in Mao's main market directed against the administration of Idriss Déby after the shooting dead of a civilian by an officer close to Déby.

On 30 September 2015, around 8 pm, a major fire burned through the main market of Mao. The origin could not be determined. No deaths were reported.

On 12 May 2016, at 5 am, a large fire spread throughout the main market of Mao, the second in under two years. The fire started in a nearby fuel depot. No human casualties were reported.

== Economy ==
On Wednesdays, which is "Grand Market Day", fresh produce is sold such as onion, garlic, dates, carrots, tomatoes, cucumbers and sometimes aubergines, which were introduced in 2009 by the UN Food and Agriculture Organization. Fruits are also sold, especially bananas and sometimes mangoes, papayas and guavas. Millet is also available in both white and red types.

== Demographics ==
Year	Population
1993	13,277
2009	35,468
2019	50,000

The population for 1993 and 2009 corresponds to the official census. For 2019 it was estimated based on population growth in the Kanem area.

== Transport ==
The area is very isolated and land travel is difficult (along sand tracks that can only be negotiated using four-by-four vehicles or camels). The town has a small airport, Mao Airport (IATA: AMO, ICAO: FTTU), with a paved runway.
