= Horațiu Potra =

Romanian mercenary

- Born: 1970 (age 55–56); Mediaș, Sibiu County, Socialist Republic of Romania
- Other name: Lieutenant Henry
- Citizenship: Romania; France
- Occupations: politician, businessman, mercenary

Horațiu Potra (born 1970, Mediaș, Socialist Republic of Romania) is a Romanian-French security expert, businessman, mercenary, and political figure. He served in the French Foreign Legion, later working as a security chief for political figures in Africa and the Middle East. He also founded a private security company and was involved in the diamond trade.

He went on the run following involvement in a failed coup attempt in Romania in December 2024. In 2025, it was reported that he had been arrested in Dubai.

== Personal life ==
In 1988, during the communist regime, Potra was admitted to the Faculty of Electrical Engineering at Politehnica University of Timișoara. He abandoned his studies in 1992 to enlist in the French Foreign Legion.

During the Romanian Revolution of December 1989, he actively participated in the events in Timișoara from the first day, including the protest in front of the Regional Council on December 16, 1989. The next day, he was present at the Giroc border crossing in the area of blocked armored vehicles. Between December 22 and 29, he was in his hometown of Mediaș, where he assisted in maintaining order and security at the city hall.

In 1995, he attended a close protection course at a school in Brussels, where he graduated with a specialization in the field. In 2009, he graduated from the Simion Bărnuțiu Faculty of Law at Lucian Blaga University in Sibiu; two years later, he obtained a master's degree in counterterrorism and crime management from the same university.

== Military career ==
Potra served as a soldier in the French Foreign Legion from 1992 to 1997. By the late 1990s, he became the head of personal security for the Emir of Qatar, Hamad bin Khalifa al-Thani.

Between 2002 and 2003, he worked as an instructor in the presidential guard of Central African Republic President Ange-Félix Patassé. During this time, he established connections with Chadian figures such as Mahamat Garfa, Mahamat Abbo Sileck, Abdoulaye Miskine from Central Africa, and Jean-Pierre Bemba from Congo. He operated under the pseudonym "Lieutenant Henry." Captured by forces loyal to François Bozizé, he managed to escape and was evacuated by the French Army.

Later, he founded a private security company, RALF-ROLE (Romanians Who Served in the French Foreign Legion - Roumanie Légion Étrangère), and engaged in the diamond trade between Sierra Leone, Brussels, Antwerp, and Tel Aviv. In 2009, he hosted Chadian rebel Mahamat Abbo Sileck at a compound in Romania. From 2012 to 2018, he served as the head of security at the Tonkolini mine operated by African Minerals Limited near Bumbuna, Sierra Leone. In early 2012, he negotiated with Chadian rebel Baba Laddé to overthrow François Bozizé and Idriss Déby.

On April 4, 2015, while overseeing security at the Tambao manganese mine in northern Burkina Faso, his employee Iulian Gherguț was kidnapped and taken to northern Mali. The kidnapping was claimed by the Al-Mourabitoune group led by Mokhtar Belmokhtar. Both men had worked in mines owned by Romanian billionaire Frank Timiș. Iulian Gherguț was released in August 2023 and repatriated to Romania. At the end of 2016 and the beginning of 2017, he formed the presidential guard for Central African Republic President Faustin-Archange Touadéra.

Since November 2022, he has been active in the Democratic Republic of Congo with approximately one hundred of his men, mostly Romanians, to protect the city of Goma and its airport, which faced an offensive by the M23 rebel group in the region.

== Political activity ==
In 2022, Potra became the Mediaș local leader of the Alliance for the Fatherland, a nationalist political party associated with Liviu Dragnea. He advocates for "a different politics focused on Romanians and supporting everything indigenous and traditional," and opposes support for Ukraine.

In November 2024, as a former candidate of the Patriots' Party for the Mediaș mayoralty, he engaged in negotiations with the Social Democratic Party (PSD) and the Alliance for the Union of Romanians (AUR) to form a majority in the local council, aiming to secure the position of deputy mayor. However, he failed due to media exposure of his ties to Călin Georgescu, remaining one of the seven local councilors of the Patriots' Party. These efforts occurred shortly after Bogdan Trif, president of the Sibiu County branch of the Social Democratic Party (PSD), publicly expressed support for him during the parliamentary elections.

== Allegations and controversies ==
In 2010, Potra was charged with cannabis and weapons trafficking, but the courts later exonerated him. The only charge that remained valid was illegal possession of weapons.

On December 8, 2024, as the leader of mercenaries providing security for Călin Georgescu, he was detained in a traffic stop along with 20 other individuals. Dozens of bladed weapons, two pistols, and significant sums of money were discovered in their vehicles. Sources close to the investigation claimed that he was planning an intimidation operation, with lists containing the names of politicians and journalists.

Additionally, it appears that he and Eugen Sechila, known for his neo-legionary affiliations and close ties to Georgescu, met in December 2024 at a horse farm in Ciolpani. During the meeting, they reportedly discussed potential planned actions in Bucharest. On December 9, 2024, images were published documenting a meeting between Georgescu, Potra, and Sechila. Although Georgescu had previously claimed not to know Potra personally, he later confirmed the authenticity of the photographs, stating that he did not remember the specific meeting. On December 10, 2024, surveillance footage from the vicinity of the Ciolpani horse farm was made public, documenting the December 7 meeting between Georgescu, Potra, and Sechila.

On February 26, 2025 a search was conducted at Potra's home, before he had left Romania and arrived in Dubai. Romanian prosecutors called for his arrest on charges including illegal weapons possession and attempts to threaten national security.

In September 2025, he was arrested in Dubai, and was extradited to Romania in November.
