= Ennedi (department) =

- Department
- Location in Central African Republic
- Country: Chad

Ennedi (Arabic: إندي) is a department of Ennedi Region in Chad.

Ennedi was a department of Chad, located in the former Ennedi Region in the northeastern part of the country. Its capital was Fada. The department was created in 2008 during an administrative reorganization of Chad and was divided into five sub-prefectures: Fada, Gouro, Kalaït, Nohi, and Ounianga. According to the 2009 census, it had a population of 59,744. The department covered part of the Sahara Desert and included areas surrounding the Ennedi Massif, a region known for its sandstone cliffs, canyons, natural arches, and prehistoric rock art. In 2012, the former Ennedi Region was divided into Ennedi-Est and Ennedi-Ouest, and the former Ennedi department became part of Ennedi-Ouest.
