= Oum Hadjer Airport =

Oum-Hadjer Airport مطار أم هاجر
- IATA: OUM; ICAO: none

Summary
- Airport type: Public
- Owner: Government
- Serves: Oum-Hadjer
- Location: Chad
- Elevation AMSL: 1,198 ft / 365 m
- Coordinates: 13°16′37.0″N 019°42′35.1″E

Map
- Location of Oum-Hadjer Airport in Chad

Runways
Direction	Length		Surface
Direction	ft	m	Surface
03/21	2,080	634	Grass
- Source: Landings.com

Oum-Hadjer Airport (IATA: OUM) (Arabic: مطار أم هاجر) is a public use airport located near Oum-Hadjer, Batha, Chad.

== See also ==
- List of airports in Chad
