= Grande Sido =

Department of Chad

Coordinates: 8°28′17″N 18°46′13″E

Grande Sido is one of three departments in Moyen-Chari, a region of Chad. Its capital is Maro.

== See also ==
- Departments of Chad
