= Djouna =

- Sub-prefecture
- Location in Chad
- Coordinates: 10.454°N 20.068°E
- Country: Chad

Djouna is a sub-prefecture of Salamat Region in Chad.
