= Delbian =

Coordinates: 9°11′N 16°12′E

- Sub-prefecture
- Location in Chad
- Country: Chad

Delbian is a sub-prefecture of Tandjilé Region in Chad.
