= Haouich =

Coordinates: 12°24′N 20°55′E

- Sub-prefecture
- Location in Chad
- Country: Chad

Haouich is a sub-prefecture of Sila Region in Chad.
