= Bol, Chad =

Bol بول City of a thousand Gods
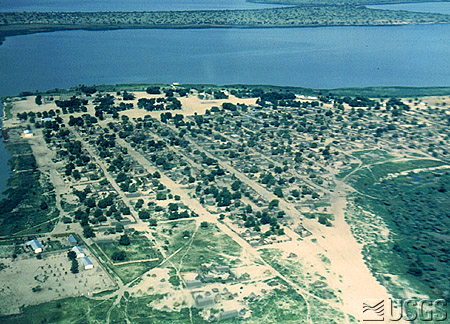
- Bol in 1971

- Location in Chad
- Coordinates: 13°27′36″N 14°44′24″E
- Country: Chad
- Region: Lac Region
- Department: Mamdi Department
- Sub-Prefecture: Bol

Population (2008)
  - Total: 11,120
- Time zone: UTC+1 (WAT)

Bol (Arabic: بول) is the capital of Chad's Lac Region, lying 152 km to the north of the national capital, N'Djamena. It lay on the shore of Lake Chad before the lake shrank. It is served by Bol Airport (IATA: OTC, ICAO: FTTL), which has a paved runway.

== Climate ==
The climate is a hot desert climate (Koppen: BWh), bordering on a semi-arid climate (Koppen: BSh), with hot temperatures and very little rainfall that only falls between July-September, during the summer monsoon that occurs during the northern shift of the ITCZ.

Climate data for Bol (1961-1990)
Month	Jan	Feb	Mar	Apr	May	Jun	Jul	Aug	Sep	Oct	Nov	Dec	Year
Mean daily maximum °C (°F)	31.3 (88.3)	32.7 (90.9)	35.3 (95.5)	39.5 (103.1)	39.0 (102.2)	37.6 (99.7)	34.4 (93.9)	31.5 (88.7)	35.2 (95.4)	36.8 (98.2)	30.4 (86.7)	28.9 (84.0)	34.4 (93.9)
Mean daily minimum °C (°F)	13.0 (55.4)	15.9 (60.6)	19.7 (67.5)	23.4 (74.1)	24.6 (76.3)	24.9 (76.8)	24.1 (75.4)	23.1 (73.6)	23.1 (73.6)	21.5 (70.7)	17.0 (62.6)	14.0 (57.2)	20.4 (68.7)
Average rainfall mm (inches)	0.0 (0.0)	0.0 (0.0)	0.0 (0.0)	0.3 (0.01)	7.5 (0.30)	19.5 (0.77)	85.3 (3.36)	121.4 (4.78)	52.3 (2.06)	3.5 (0.14)	0.0 (0.0)	0.0 (0.0)	289.8 (11.42)
Average rainy days (≥ 0.1 mm)	0	0	0	1	2	3	8	11	5	2	0	0	32
Source: WMO

== Demographics ==
Year	Population
1993	7,769
2008	11,120
2017	11,701
