= Mabrone =

- Sub-prefecture
- Location in Chad
- Coordinates: 13.928°N 21.768°E
- Country: Chad

Mabrone is a sub-prefecture of Ouaddaï Region in Chad.
