= Dogou =

- Sub-prefecture
- Location in Chad
- Country: Chad

Dogou is a sub-prefecture of Tandjilé Region in Chad.
