= Krim Krim =

Coordinates: 8°58′N 15°48′E

- Sub-prefecture
- Location in Chad
- Country: Chad

Krim Krim is a sub-prefecture of Logone Occidental Region in Chad.
