= Dafra, Chad =

Dafra
- Sub-prefecture
- Location in Chad
- Country: Chad

Dafra is a sub-prefecture of Kélo, Tandjilé Region in Chad.
