= Am Habilé =

- Sub-prefecture
- Location in Chad
- Coordinates: 11.440°N 19.904°E
- Country: Chad

Am Habilé is a sub-prefecture of Salamat Region in Chad. It is located in the southeast of the country.

== Geographical location ==
The city is in the southeastern part of Chad, south of wadi Juruf, at an altitude of 508 meters above sea level. Am Habil is located approximately 523 kilometers east-southeast (ESE) of the capital N'djamena.

== Population ==
As of the 2009 official census, Am Habil had a population of 24,373 (11,464 males and 12,909 females). The population of the subject by age range was distributed as follows: 52.7% — residents under 15 years old, 42.1% — between 15 and 59 years old and 5.2% — aged 60 years and older.

== Transport ==
The nearest airport is located in the city Am-Timan.
