= Magrane, Chad =

Magrane
- Sub-prefecture
- Location in Chad
- Country: Chad

Magrane is a sub-prefecture of Sila Region in Chad.
