= Déli =

Coordinates: 8°43′N 15°53′E

- Sub-prefecture
- Location in Chad
- Country: Chad

Déli is a sub-prefecture of Logone Occidental Region in Chad.
