= Hadjer Hadid =

- Sub-prefecture
- Location in Chad
- Coordinates: 13.482°N 21.710°E
- Country: Chad

Hadjer Hadid is a sub-prefecture of Ouaddaï Region in Chad.
