= Béboni =

Coordinates: 8°47′N 16°39′E

- Sub-prefecture
- Location in Chad
- Country: Chad

Béboni is a sub-prefecture of Logone Occidental Region in Chad.
