= Bourou, Chad =

Bourou
- Sub-prefecture
- Location in Chad
- Coordinates: 9.0575°N 16.3613°E
- Country: Chad

Bourou is a sub-prefecture of Logone Occidental Region in Chad.
