= Amleyouna =

Coordinates: 13°45′32″N 21°21′29″E

- Sub-prefecture
- Location in Chad
- Country: Chad

Amleyouna is a sub-prefecture of Ouaddaï Region in Chad.
