= Béssao =

Coordinates: 8°19′N 16°09′E

- Sub-prefecture
- Location in Chad
- Country: Chad

Béssao is a sub-prefecture of Logone Occidental Region in Chad.
