= Tourane, Chad =

Tourane
- Sub-prefecture
- Location in Chad
- Coordinates: 13.777°N 21.533°E
- Country: Chad

Tourane is a sub-prefecture of Ouaddaï Region in Chad.
