= Donia (Chad) =

Coordinates: 8°24′N 16°25′E

- Sub-prefecture
- Location in Chad
- Country: Chad

Donia is a sub-prefecture of Logone Occidental Region in Chad.
