= Kolon, Chad =

Kolon
- Sub-prefecture
- Location in Chad
- Country: Chad

Kolon is a sub-prefecture of Tandjilé Region in Chad.
