= Biyeré =

- Sub-prefecture
- Location in Chad
- Coordinates: 12.74°N 21.00°E
- Country: Chad

Biyeré is a sub-prefecture of Ouaddaï Region in Chad.
