= Moulkou =

Moulkou Moulgou
- Sub-prefecture
- Location in Chad
- Coordinates: 10°32′45″N 15°34′45″E
- Country: Chad

Moulkou is a sub-prefecture of Mayo-Kebbi Est Region in Chad.
