= Bao, Chad =

Bao
- Sub-prefecture
- Location in Chad
- Country: Chad

Bao is a sub-prefecture of Logone Occidental Region in Chad.
