= Kara, Chad =

Kara
- Sub-prefecture
- Location in Chad
- Country: Chad

Kara is a sub-prefecture of Logone Occidental Region in Chad.
