= Lagon =

Coordinates: 9°28′N 14°32′E

- Sub-prefecture
- Location in Chad
- Country: Chad

Lagon is a sub-prefecture of Mayo-Kebbi Ouest Region in Chad.
