= Daboua =

Coordinates: 14°25′N 13°37′E

- Sub-prefecture
- Location in Chad
- Country: Chad

Daboua is a sub-prefecture of Lac Region in Chad.
