= Dodinda =

Coordinates: 8°25′N 15°49′E

- Sub-prefecture
- Location in Chad
- Country: Chad

Dodinda is a sub-prefecture of Logone Occidental Region in Chad.
