= Mondo, Chad =

Mondo
- Sub-prefecture
- Location in Chad
- Country: Chad

Mondo is a sub-prefecture of Kanem Region in Chad.
