= Maï Aïche =

- Sub-prefecture
- Location in Chad
- Coordinates: 12.001°N 15.736°E
- Country: Chad

Maï Aïche is a sub-prefecture of Chari-Baguirmi Region in Chad.
