= Mamdi Department =

Department of Lac, Chad

Coordinates: 7.667959°N 15.914978°E

Mamdi (Arabic: مامدي) is one of two departments in Lac, a region of Chad. Its capital is Bol.

== See also ==
- Departments of Chad
