= Mballa Banyo =

- Sub-prefecture
- Location in Chad
- Country: Chad

Mballa Banyo is a sub-prefecture of Logone Occidental Region in Chad.
