= Mbikou =

Coordinates: 8°36′N 16°24′E

- Sub-prefecture
- Location in Chad
- Country: Chad

Mbikou is a sub-prefecture of Logone Occidental Region in Chad.

== Administration ==
Mbikou is the capital of one of the five sub-prefectures of the Nya department, which itself is part of the Logone-Oriental government. .
