= Arada, Chad =

Arada Arabic: أردا
- Location in Chad
- Coordinates: 15°1′11″N 20°39′31″E
- Country: Chad
- Region: Wadi Fira
- Department: Biltine
- Sub-Prefecture: Arada

Arada (Arabic: أردا) is a town and subprefecture in the department of Biltine in eastern Chad.

== History ==
In early January 1987 during the Toyota War, Libyan forces bombed Arada, in retaliation for the Libyan defeat in the Battle of Fada. Because this violated the 1984 French-Libyan treaty that set zones of influence on both sides of the 16th parallel, Arada lying in the southern, French zone, France decided to intervene militarily by bombing the airbase of Ouadi Doum (similar to the 1986 air raid), destroying several Libyan aircraft and the radar station.

== Economy ==
The town has an important grain market. Many rural citizens earn their incomes by weaving straw fences.
