= Guidari =

Coordinates: 9°16′N 16°40′E

- Sub-prefecture
- Location in Chad
- Country: Chad

Guidari is a sub-prefecture of Tandjilé Region in Chad.
