= Amsilep =

- Sub-prefecture
- Location in Chad
- Coordinates: 13°22′39″N 16°47′04″E
- Country: Chad

Amsilep is a sub-prefecture of Bahr el Gazel in Chad.
