= Berem, Chad =

Berem
- Sub-prefecture
- Location in Chad
- Coordinates: 9.487°N 15.3877°E
- Country: Chad

Berem is a sub-prefecture of Mayo-Kebbi Est Region in Chad.
