= Marfa, Chad =

Marfa
- Sub-prefecture
- Location in Chad
- Country: Chad

Marfa is a sub-prefecture of Ouaddaï Region in Chad.
