= Mangueigne =

Coordinates: 10°31′N 21°19′E

- Sub-prefecture
- Location in Chad
- Country: Chad

Mangueigne is a sub-prefecture of Salamat Region in Chad.
