= Djéké Djéké =

- Sub-prefecture
- Location in Chad
- Country: Chad

Djéké Djéké is a sub-prefecture of Moyen-Chari Region in Chad.
