= Kouba Olanga =

Coordinates: 15°45′N 18°18′E

- Sub-prefecture
- Location in Chad
- Country: Chad

Kouba Olanga is a sub-prefecture of Bourkou Region in Chad.
