= Daha, Chad =

Daha
- Sub-prefecture
- Location in Chad
- Country: Chad

Daha is a sub-prefecture of Salamat Region in Chad.
