= Koyom =

Coordinates: 9°49′N 15°53′E

- Sub-prefecture
- Location in Chad
- Country: Chad

Koyom is a sub-prefecture Mayo-Kebbi Est Region in Chad.
