= Abgué =

- Sub-prefecture
- Location in Chad
- Coordinates: 11.962°N 19.511°E
- Country: Chad

Abgué is a sub-prefecture of Salamat Region in Chad.
