= Gurry =

- Sub-prefecture
- Location in Chad
- Country: Chad

Gurry is a sub-prefecture of Ouaddaï Region in Chad.
