= Madana, Chad =

Madana
- Sub-prefecture
- Location in Chad
- Country: Chad

Madana is a sub-prefecture of Logone Occidental Region in Chad.
