= Baktchoro =

- Sub-prefecture
- Location in Chad
- Coordinates: 9.505°N 15.81417°E
- Country: Chad

Baktchoro is a sub-prefecture of Tandjilé Region in Chad.
