= Birgit language =

Chadic language spoken in Chad

Birgit
- Bergit
- Native to: Chad
- Region: Ouaddai, Salamat, Sila, Batha
- Native speakers: 29,000 (2023)
- Language family: Afro-Asiatic: Chadic; East Chadic; East Chadic B; Mubi (B.1.2); Birgit
- Dialects: Abgue; Agrab; Duguri; Eastern Birgit

Language codes
- ISO 639-3: btf
- Glottolog: birg1239

Birgit (also known as Bergit, Birgid, Berguid) is an Afro-Asiatic language spoken in southeastern Chad. Speakers are found in Moubi Goz Canton, Kouka Margni Sub-prefecture and in Moubi Zarga Canton, Mangalmé Sub-prefecture.
