= Bologo, Chad =

Coordinates: 9°09′N 15°48′E

Bologo
- Sub-prefecture
- Location in Chad
- Country: Chad

Bologo is a sub-prefecture of Tandjilé Region in southern Chad. The villages of Mboktol and Maouya lie in the area. There are several Oil fields in the region surrounding Bologo. In recent years, charitable organizations have funded schools and infra drives in the area. In 2025, an outbreak of Measles occurred in the region, resulting in a shutdown of schools as well as places of worship.
