= Haraze Djombo Kibet =

Haraze Djombo Kibet حراز جمبو كيبيت Haraze-Djombo Kibit
- Location in Chad
- Coordinates: 13°57′7″N 19°26′12″E
- Country: Chad
- Region: Batha
- Department: Batha Est
- Sub-Prefecture: Haraze Djombo Kibet (حراز جمبو كيبيت)

Haraze Djombo Kibet (or Haraze Djombo Kibit) is a sub-prefecture of Batha Region in Chad.
