= Doguindi =

Coordinates: 8°52′N 15°54′E

- Sub-prefecture
- Location in Chad
- Country: Chad

Doguindi is a sub-prefecture of Logone Occidental Region in Chad.
