= Mani, Chad =

Mani ماني
- Location in Chad
- Coordinates: 12°44′0″N 14°41′0″E
- Country: Chad
- Region: Hadjer-Lamis
- Department: Haraze Al Biar
- Sub-Prefecture: Mani
- Time zone: +1

Mani (Arabic: ماني) is a town in Hadjer-Lamis region, western Chad, south of the Lake Chad, on the border with Cameroon.
