= Kouloudia =

Coordinates: 13°01′N 15°16′E

- Sub-prefecture
- Location in Chad
- Country: Chad

Kouloudia is a sub-prefecture of Lac Region in Chad.
