= Béïssa =

Coordinates: 8°45′N 15°37′E

- Sub-prefecture
- Location in Chad
- Country: Chad

Béïssa is a sub-prefecture of Logone Occidental Region in Chad.
