= Sila (region) =

Region of Chad

Sila سيلا Sīlā Dar Sila
- Province
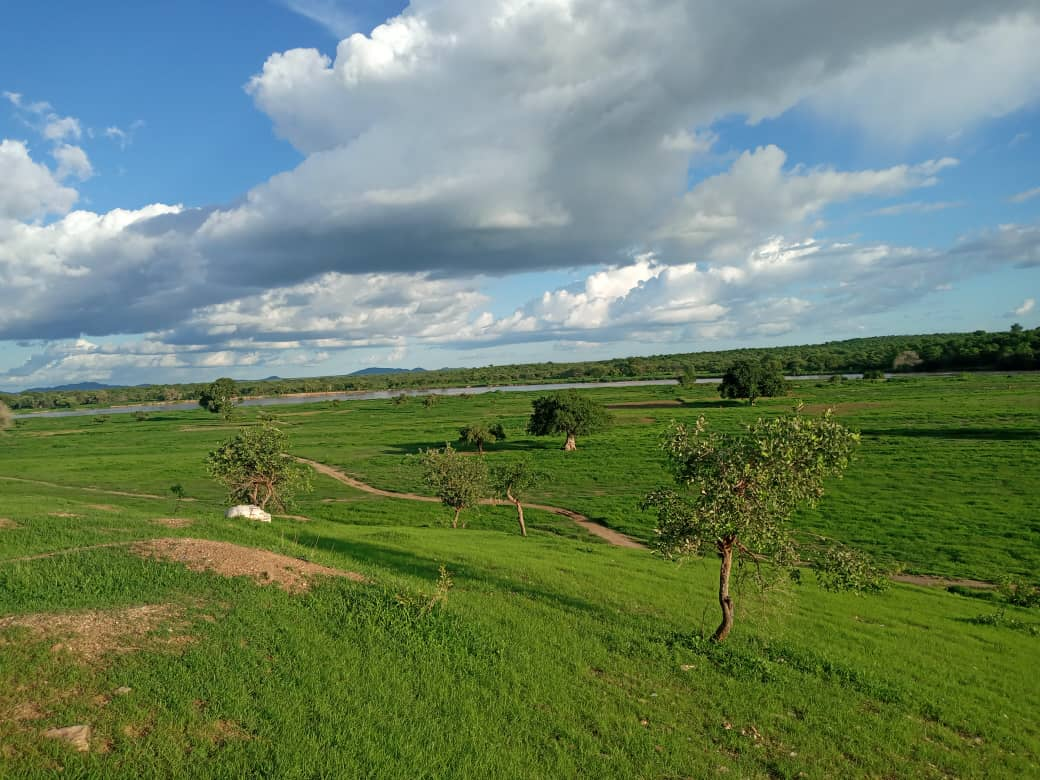
- Landscape near Goz Beïda

- Map of Chad showing Sila.
- Coordinates: 12°13′25″N 21°24′52″E
- Country: Chad
- Departments: 2
- Sub-prefectures: 10
- Province: 2008
- Provincial capital: Goz Beïda

Population (2009)
  - Total: 387,461
- Time zone: UTC+01:00 (WAT)

Sila (Arabic: سيلا, romanised: Sīlā), also known as Dar Sila, is a province of Chad, located in the south-east of the country. It was created in 2008 from the departments of Sila and Djourf Al Ahmar which were previously part of Ouaddaï Region. The capital of the region is Goz Beïda.

== Geography ==
The province borders Ouaddaï Region to the north, Sudan to the east, the Central African Republic to the south-east, Salamat Region to the south-west, and Guéra Region to the west. The terrain is generally flat savannah, with some scattered hills.

=== Settlements ===
Goz Beïda is the capital of the province; other major settlements include Adé, Am Dam, Haouich, Kerfi, Koukou Angarana, Magrane, Mogororo, Moudeïna and Tissi.

== Demographics ==
As per the 2009 Chadian census, Sila has a population of 387,461. The main ethnolinguistic groups are the Birgit, Dar Sila Daju, Fongoro, Fur, Kajakse, Karanga, Kibet, Kujarge, Runga and Sinyar.

== Subdivisions ==
Sila is divided into two departments:

| Department | Capital (chef-lieu) | Sub-prefectures |
|---|---|---|
| Djourf Al Ahmar | Am Dam | Am Dam, Magrane, Haouich |
| Kimiti | Goz Beïda | Goz Beïda, Koukou-Angarana, Tissi, Adé, Mogororo, Kerfi, Moudeïna |

== See also ==
- Dar Sila
