= Bah, Chad =

Coordinates: 8°33′N 15°51′E

Bah
- Sub-prefecture
- Location in Chad
- Country: Chad

Bah is a sub-prefecture of Logone Occidental Region in Chad.
