= Hollom Gamé =

- Sub-prefecture
- Location in Chad
- Country: Chad

Hollom Gamé is a sub-prefecture of Mayo-Kebbi Est Region Chad.
