= Molou =

- Sub-prefecture
- Location in Chad
- Coordinates: 13.701°N 21.738°E
- Country: Chad

Molou is a sub-prefecture of Ouaddaï Region in Chad.
