= Samga =

- Sub-prefecture
- Location in Chad
- Country: Chad

Samga is a sub-prefecture of Mayo-Kebbi Est Region in Chad.
