= Mbaïkoro =

Coordinates: 8°32′N 16°15′E

- Sub-prefecture
- Location in Chad
- Country: Chad

Mbaïkoro is a sub-prefecture of Logone Occidental Region in Chad.
