= Torrock =

Coordinates: 9°39′N 15°01′E

- Sub-prefecture
- Location in Chad
- Country: Chad

Torrock is a sub-prefecture of Mayo-Kebbi Ouest Region in Chad.
