= Koukou-Angarana =

- Sub-prefecture
- Location in Chad
- Country: Chad

Koukou-Angarana is a sub-prefecture of Sila Region in Chad.
