= Guégou =

Coordinates: 9°36′N 14°05′E

- Sub-prefecture
- Location in Chad
- Country: Chad

Guégou is a sub-prefecture of Mayo-Kebbi Ouest Region Chad.
