= Békan =

Coordinates: 7°49′N 16°25′E

- Sub-prefecture
- Location in Chad
- Country: Chad

Békan is a sub-prefecture of Logone Occidental Region in Chad.
