= Bourtaïl =

Coordinates: 13°10′N 21°38′E

- Sub-prefecture
- Location in Chad
- Country: Chad

Bourtaïl is a sub-prefecture of Ouaddaï Region in Chad.
