= Békiri =

Coordinates: 8°54′N 16°33′E

- Sub-prefecture
- Location in Chad
- Country: Chad

Békiri is a sub-prefecture of Logone Occidental Region in Chad.
