= Chokoyan =

Coordinates: 13°22′N 21°14′E

- Sub-prefecture
- Location in Chad
- Country: Chad

Chokoyan is a sub-prefecture of Ouaddaï Region in Chad.
