= Liwa, Chad =

Coordinates: 13°52′N 14°16′E

Liwa
- Sub-prefecture
- Location in Chad
- Country: Chad

Liwa is a sub-prefecture of Lac Region in Chad.
