= Ba Ili =

Sub-prefecture of Chad

- Sub-prefecture
- Location in Chad
- Coordinates: 10.50958°N 16.44189°E
- Country: Chad

Ba Ili is a sub-prefecture of Loug Chari, located in Chari-Baguirmi province, Chad.

Ba Ili Airport is located nearby.
