= Koundjourou =

Coordinates: 13°05′N 18°36′E

- Sub-prefecture
- Location in Chad
- Country: Chad

Koundjourou is a sub-prefecture of Batha Region in Chad.
