= Yamodo =

Coordinates: 7°52′N 17°07′E

- Sub-prefecture
- Location in Chad
- Country: Chad

Yamodo is a sub-prefecture of Logone Occidental Region in Chad.
