= Kim, Chad =

Coordinates: 9°44′N 15°55′E

Kim
- Sub-prefecture
- Location in Chad
- Country: Chad

Kim is a sub-prefecture Mayo-Kebbi Est Region in Chad.
