= Youé =

Coordinates: 9°55′N 14°56′E

- Sub-prefecture
- Location in Chad
- Country: Chad

Youé is a sub-prefecture of Mayo-Kebbi Est Region in Chad.
