= Danamadji =

Coordinates: 8°45′N 18°33′E

- Sub-prefecture
- Location in Chad
- Country: Chad

Danamadji is a sub-prefecture of Moyen-Chari Region in Chad.
