= Moussa Foyo =

- Sub-prefecture
- Location in Chad
- Country: Chad

Moussa Foyo is a sub-prefecture of Moyen-Chari Region in Chad.
