= Gam, Chad =

Coordinates: 10°12′N 16°09′E

Gam
- Sub-prefecture
- Location in Chad
- Country: Chad

Gam is a sub-prefecture Mayo-Kebbi Est Region in Chad.
