= Dono Manga =

- Sub-prefecture
- Location in Chad
- Coordinates: 9°14′0.435″N 16°55′14.963″E
- Country: Chad

Dono Manga is a sub-prefecture of Tandjilé Region in Chad.
