= Mouraye =

Mouraye Mouraïa
- Sub-prefecture
- Location in Chad
- Coordinates: 11.341°N 20.839°E
- Country: Chad

Mouraye is a sub-prefecture of Salamat Region in Chad.
