= Bagassola =

- Sub-prefecture
- Location in Chad
- Country: Chad

Bagassola is a sub-prefecture of Lac Region in Chad.
