= Kéra =

- Sub-prefecture
- Location in Chad
- Country: Chad

Kéra is a sub-prefecture of Mayo-Kebbi Est Region in Chad.
