= Kangalam =

- Sub-prefecture
- Location in Chad
- Country: Chad

Kangalam is a sub-prefecture of Lac Region in Chad.
