= Sido, Chad =

Sido
- Sub-prefecture
- Location in Chad
- Country: Chad

Sido is a sub-prefecture of Moyen-Chari Region in Chad.
