= Gagal =

Gagal گاگل
- Village
- Location within Iran
- Coordinates: 35°38′09″N 46°11′58″E
- Country: Iran
- Province: Kurdistan
- County: Marivan
- Bakhsh: Khav and Mirabad
- Rural District: Khav and Mirabad

Population (2006)
  - Total: 421
- Time zone: UTC+3:30 (IRST)
  - Summer (DST): UTC+4:30 (IRDT)

Gagal (Persian: گاگل, also Romanized as Gāgal and Gāgel; also known as Gāgil, Kāgel, and Kākel) is a village in Khav and Mirabad Rural District, Khav and Mirabad District, Marivan County, Kurdistan Province, Iran. At the 2006 census, its population was 421, in 87 families. The village is populated by Kurds.
