= Lamé, Chad =

Coordinates: 9°15′N 14°32′E

Lamé
- Sub-prefecture
- Location in Chad
- Country: Chad

Lamé is a sub-prefecture of Mayo-Kebbi Ouest Region in Chad.
