= Tourba =

- Sub-prefecture
- Location in Chad
- Country: Chad

Tourba is a sub-prefecture of Hadjer-Lamis Region in Chad.
