= Roro, Chad =

Coordinates: 9°42′N 19°05′E

Roro
- Sub-prefecture
- Location in Chad
- Country: Chad

Roro is a sub-prefecture of Moyen-Chari Region in Chad.
