= Boum Kebbir =

- Sub-prefecture
- Location in Chad
- Country: Chad

Boum Kebbir, also Boum Kébir, is a sub-prefecture of Moyen-Chari Region in Chad.
