= Bogomoro =

Coordinates: 10°49′N 16°00′E

- Sub-prefecture
- Location in Chad
- Country: Chad

Bogomoro is a sub-prefecture of Chari-Baguirmi Region in Chad.
