= Mogororo =

Coordinates: 12°01′N 22°28′E

- Sub-prefecture
- Location in Chad
- Country: Chad

Mogororo is a sub-prefecture of Sila Region in Chad.
