= Goubonne =

- Sub-prefecture
- Location in Chad
- Country: Chad

Goubonne is a sub-prefecture of Tibesti Region in Chad.
