= Melea, Chad =

Melea
- Sub-prefecture
- Location in Chad
- Country: Chad

Melea is a sub-prefecture of Kanem Region in Chad.
