= Mandélia =

Coordinates: 11°44′N 15°15′E

- Sub-prefecture
- Location in Chad
- Country: Chad

Mandélia is a sub-prefecture of Chari-Baguirmi Region in Chad.
