= Kolonga, Chad =

Kolonga
- Sub-prefecture
- Location in Chad
- Country: Chad

Kolonga is a sub-prefecture of Wadi Fira Region in Chad.
