= Alako =

Coordinates: 9°48′N 18°53′E

- Sub-prefecture
- Location in Chad
- Country: Chad

Alako is a sub-prefecture of Moyen-Chari Region in Chad.
