= Bohobé =

Coordinates: 9°28′N 18°23′E

- Sub-prefecture and village
- Location in Chad
- Country: Chad

Bohobé is a sub-prefecture and village in the Moyen-Chari Region of Chad.
