= Bitchotchi =

- Sub-prefecture
- Location in Chad
- Country: Chad

Bitchotchi is a sub-prefecture of Guéra Region in Chad.

== Demographics ==
Ethnic composition by canton in 2016:

Moubi Hadaba Canton (population: 32,135; villages: 58):

Ethnic group	Linguistic affiliation	Percentage
Mubi	East Chadic	87
Arab	Semitic	10
Mesmeje	Bagirmi	3
