= Binder, Chad =

Coordinates: 9°58′N 14°28′E

Binder
- Sub-prefecture
- Location in Chad
- Country: Chad

Binder is a sub-prefecture of Mayo-Kebbi Ouest Region in Chad.
