= Massaguet =

Massaguet المساقط
- City
- Location in Chad
- Coordinates: 12°28′27″N 15°26′34″E
- Country: Chad
- Region: Hadjer-Lamis
- Department: Haraze Al Biar
- Sub-Prefecture: Massaguet
- Elevation: 961 ft (293 m)

Population (2008)
  - Total: 18 872
- Time zone: UTC+01:00 (WAT)

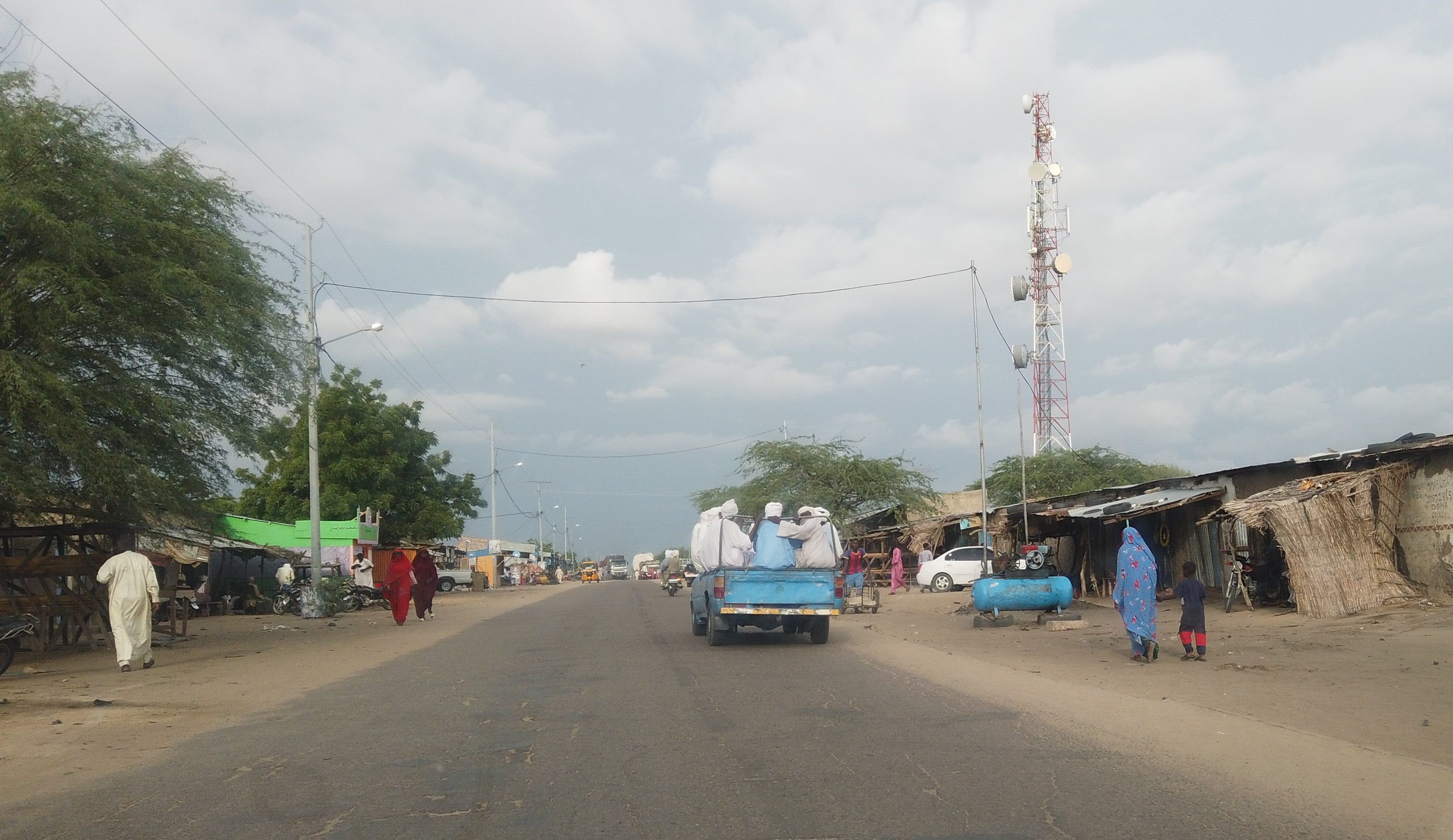
The entryway to Massaguet

Massaguet (Arabic: المساقط, al-Masāqiṭ) is a city in Hadjer-Lamis region, western Chad. It is located at around 12°28′27″N 15°26′34″E. An 86.6 km (87 km) highway completed in 1969 connects Massaguet with N'Djamena.

== Demographics ==
Year	Population
1993	13,185
2008	18,872
