= Karal, Chad =

Karal
- Sub-prefecture
- Location in Chad
- Country: Chad

Karal is a sub-prefecture of Hadjer-Lamis Region in Chad.
