= Bédjo =

- Sub-prefecture
- Location in Chad
- Country: Chad

Bédjo is a sub-prefecture of the region of Logone Occidental in Chad.
