= Baïbokoum =

Baibokoum
- Baïbokoum
- Map Showing Baibokoum in Chad
- Coordinates: 7°45′N 15°41′E
- Country: Chad
- Region: Logone Oriental
- Department: Monts de Lam
- Sub-Prefecture: Baibokoum

Baïbokoum is the capital city of the Monts de Lam department of the Logone Oriental Region in Chad. In a 2009 census, its population was 18,685.

Baibokoum is located in the Baibokoum sub-prefecture
