= Am Sack =

Am Sack أم ساك
- Sub-prefecture
- Location in Chad
- Coordinates: 13°40′1.574″N 19°45′35.136″E
- Country: Chad
- Region: Batha

Am Sack is a sub-prefecture of Batha Region in Chad.
