= Singako =

Coordinates: 9°50′N 19°28′E

- Sub-prefecture
- Location in Chad
- Country: Chad

Singako is a sub-prefecture of Moyen-Chari Region in Chad.
