= Mangalmé =

Coordinates: 12°21′N 19°37′E

- Sub-prefecture
- Location in Chad
- Country: Chad

Mangalmé is a sub-prefecture of Guéra Region in Chad.

== Demographics ==
Ethnic composition by canton in 2016:

Moubi Zarga Canton (population: 38,800; villages: 74):

Ethnic group	Linguistic affiliation	Percentage
Mubi	East Chadic	89
Arab	Semitic	9
Birgid	East Chadic	2
