= Miandoum =

Coordinates: 8°35′N 16°35′E

- Sub-prefecture
- Location in Chad
- Country: Chad

Miandoum is a sub-prefecture of Logone Occidental Region in Chad.
