= Mogo, Chad =

Mogo
- Sub-prefecture
- Location in Chad
- Country: Chad

Mogo is a sub-prefecture of Chari-Baguirmi Region in Chad.
