= Kouka Margni =

- Sub-prefecture
- Location in Chad
- Country: Chad

Kouka Margni is a sub-prefecture of Guéra Region in Chad.

== Demographics ==
Ethnic composition by canton in 2016:

Moubi Goz Canton (population: 30,475; villages: 32):

Ethnic group	Linguistic affiliation	Percentage
Mubi	East Chadic	84
Birgid	East Chadic	10
Arab	Semitic	6
