= Kouno, Chad =

Kouno
- Sub-prefecture
- Location in Chad
- Country: Chad

Kouno is a sub-prefecture of Chari-Baguirmi Region in Chad.
