= Abdi, Chad =

Abdi
- Sub-prefecture
- Location in Chad 2° 80′ north, 21° 30′ east
- Coordinates: 12.80°N 21.30°E
- Country: Chad

Abdi is a city of Chad. It is the capital of the department of the same name in the region of Ouaddai. Abdi is also sub-prefecture of Ouaddaï Region in Chad.

== Geography ==
The Abdi prefecture brings together three cantons (Abdi center, Abker and Biéré). The Abkar canton is the economic and administrative center of the department.

== Education ==
After the 2002 legislative elections, Habib Oumar Abdelziz was the deputy for this constituency. Abdi went from cantonal capital to sub-prefecture in 2000, then in 2008 became a department.
