= Wadjigui =

- Sub-prefecture
- Location in Chad
- Country: Chad

Wadjigui is a sub-prefecture of Kanem Region in Chad.
