= Kerfi, Chad =

Kerfi
- Sub-prefecture
- Location in Chad
- Country: Chad

Kerfi is a sub-prefecture of Sila Region in Chad.
