= Baltoubaye =

Coordinates: 9°46′N 18°42′E

- Sub-prefecture
- Location in Chad
- Country: Chad

Baltoubaye is a sub-prefecture of Moyen-Chari Region in Chad.
