= Nokou =

- Town and Sub-prefecture
- Location in Chad
- Coordinates: 14°34′57″N 14°46′52″E
- Country: Chad
- Elevation: 1,155 ft (352 m)
- Time zone: UTC+01:00 (WAT)

Nokou is a town and sub-prefecture of Kanem Region in Chad. It is the capital of the department of Nord Kanem.

On April 18, 2021, Chadian president Idriss Déby was wounded by gunfire in the nearby town of Mele, as part of the Northern Chad offensive by the Front for Change and Concord in Chad (FACT). Déby was subsequently moved to the capital of Chad, N'Djamena, where he died two days later.
