= Assinet =

- Sub-prefecture
- Location in Chad
- Coordinates: 13°13′29″N 19°11′55″E
- Country: Chad

Assinet is a sub-prefecture of Batha Region in Chad.
