= Gama, Chad =

Gama
- Sub-prefecture
- Location in Chad
- Country: Chad

Gama is a sub-prefecture of Hadjer-Lamis Region in Chad.
