= Tissi, Chad =

Tissi
- Sub-prefecture
- Location in Chad
- Country: Chad

Tissi is a sub-prefecture of Sila Region in Chad.
