= Yarda, Chad =

Yarda
- Sub-prefecture
- Location in Chad
- Country: Chad

Yarda is a sub-prefecture of Batha Region in Chad.
