= La Loumia =

- Sub-prefecture
- Location in Chad
- Country: Chad

La Loumia is a sub-prefecture of Chari-Baguirmi Region in Chad.
