= Bodo, Chad =

Bodo
- Sub-prefecture
- Location in Chad
- Country: Chad

Bodo is a sub-prefecture of Logone Occidental Region in Chad.
