= Ntiona =

Coordinates: 14°27′N 15°26′E

- Sub-prefecture
- Location in Chad
- Country: Chad

Ntiona is a sub-prefecture of Kanem Region in Chad.
