= Ngouri =

- Sub-prefecture
- Location in Chad
- Country: Chad

Ngouri is a sub-prefecture of Lac Region in Chad.
