= Moïto =

Coordinates: 12°35′N 16°33′E

- Sub-prefecture
- Location in Chad
- Country: Chad

Moïto is a sub-prefecture of Hadjer-Lamis Region in Chad.
