= Kirdimi =

- Sub-prefecture
- Location in Chad
- Country: Chad

Kirdimi is a sub-prefecture of Batha Region in Chad.
