= Dobiti =

Coordinates: 8°07′N 16°45′E

- Sub-prefecture
- Location in Chad
- Country: Chad

Dobiti is a sub-prefecture of Logone Occidental Region in Chad.
