= Lougoun =

- Sub-prefecture
- Location in Chad
- Country: Chad

Lougoun is a sub-prefecture of Chari-Baguirmi Region in Chad.
