= Kekedina =

- Sub-prefecture
- Location in Chad
- Country: Chad

Kekedina is a sub-prefecture of Kanem Region in Chad.
