= Abkar Djombo =

- Sub-prefecture
- Location in Chad 13°18′N 21°08′E
- Coordinates: 13.18°N 21.08°E
- Country: Chad

Abkar Djombo is a sub-prefecture of Ouaddaï Region in Chad.
