= Moudeïna =

- Sub-prefecture
- Location in Chad
- Country: Chad

Moudeïna is a sub-prefecture of Sila Region in Chad.
