= Ziguey =

Coordinates: 14°43′N 15°48′E

- Sub-prefecture
- Location in Chad
- Country: Chad

Ziguey is a sub-prefecture of Kanem Region in Chad.
