= Am Zoer =

Coordinates: 14°13′N 21°23′E

- Sub-prefecture
- Location in Chad
- Country: Chad

Am Zoer is a sub-prefecture of Wadi Fira Region in Chad.
