= Koundoul =

Coordinates: 11°58′N 15°09′E

- Sub-prefecture
- Location in Chad
- Country: Chad

Koundoul is a sub-prefecture of Chari-Baguirmi Region in Chad.
