= Maro, Chad =

Maro
- Sub-prefecture
- Location in Chad
- Country: Chad

Maro is a sub-prefecture of Moyen-Chari Region in Chad.
