= Rig Rig =

Coordinates: 14°16′N 14°21′E

- Sub-prefecture
- Location in Chad
- Country: Chad

Rig Rig is a sub-prefecture of Kanem Region in Chad.
