= Linia, Chad =

Linia لينيا
- Town
- Location in Chad
- Coordinates: 12°03′17″N 15°18′10″E
- Country: Chad
- Region: Chari-Baguirmi Region
- Elevation: 988 ft (301 m)
- Time zone: UTC+01:00 (WAT)

Linia (Arabic: لينيا) is a town in Chad, lying 30km east of N'Djamena. It is known for its large market.
