= Chadian literature =

Chadian literature has suffered greatly from the turmoil which has engulfed the country, economical and political. As with many cultures, literature in Chad began with folk tales and legends. While French is the dominant language, Arabic is also used by some Chadian writers. Chadian literature is more prevalent in France than in Chad itself, due to market demand and the repressive culture present in Chad.

Chad's only literary critic, Ahmat Taboye, wrote Anthologie de la littérature tchadienne in 2003 to spread knowledge of Chadian literature. Though there are not very many well-known Chadian writers, there are a few, including Joseph Brahim Seïd, Baba Moustapha, Antoine Bangui, Koulsy Lamko, Nimrod, and Noël Nétonon Ndjékéry.

== See also ==
- Culture of Chad
- List of Chad-related topics
