= Goz Beïda Airport =

Airport in Sila, Chad

- IATA: none; ICAO: FTTG

Summary
- Airport type: Public
- Owner: Government
- Serves: Goz Beïda
- Location: Chad
- Elevation AMSL: 1,827 ft / 557 m
- Coordinates: 12°12′38.6″N 021°27′31.8″E

Map
- Location of Goz Beïda Airport in Chad

Runways
Direction	Length		Surface
Direction	ft	m	Surface
17/35	5,930	1,807	Dirt
- Source: Landings.com

Goz Beïda Airport (ICAO: FTTG) (Arabic: مطار قوز بيدا) is a small, public use airport located 5 kilometres (3 mi) east-southeast of Goz Beïda, Sila, Chad. There is one runway about 1500 m x 40 m long.

== See also ==
- List of airports in Chad
