= Goz Beïda =

Goz Beïda قوز بيدا
- Location in Chad
- Coordinates: 12°13′25″N 21°24′52″E
- Country: Chad
- Region: Sila (Dar Sila)
- Department: Kimiti
- Sub-Prefecture: Goz Beïda
- Time zone: +1

Goz Beïda (Arabic: قوز بيضة, romanised: Qūz Bayḍah) is a town located in eastern Chad. It is the capital of the Sila region and the Kimiti department. Prior to 2008, Goz Beïda was part of the Ouaddaï Region's former Sila Department.

It is situated about 70 kilometres (43 mi) from the border with Sudan's western Darfur Region, and 1,200 km by road from N'Djamena, the Chadian capital. The town is served by Goz Beïda Airport.

Due to its proximity to Sudan, Goz Beïda holds a geographically strategic location, both for cross-border trade and as a transit point during regional crises, frequently receiving an influx of refugees from the neighboring country.

== History ==
The name Goz Beïda derives from the combination of the Chadian Arabic words Goz (sand) and Beïda (white), literally meaning "white sand". Indeed, the town stretches out, shaded by some large trees, over white sand surrounded by ochre rocks. Sultan Hyssac Habreche is said to have given this name to the region in the 16th century.

Goz Beïda maintains historical ties with the Daju, an Islamized people from southern Ouaddaï, and is home to the tata of Goz Beïda, the residence of the Sultan of Daju. The town was also part of the Ouaddaï Empire.

During the French colonization in the first half of the 20th century, the region was incorporated into French Chad, which was part of French Equatorial Africa. After Chad gained independence in 1960, Goz Beïda, like many other areas of the new country, faced challenges in integration and development.

In the early 21st century, the town hosted tens of thousands of Sudanese refugees due to the Darfur conflict. Additionally, it hosted tens of thousands of internally displaced Chadian, primarily due to internal conflicts in the country at the time. As a result, Goz Beïda has been surrounded by refugee camps managed by international humanitarian organizations. One example is the Djabel camp, located 4 km from the town center, managed by United Nations High Commissioner for Refugees (UNHCR).

In addition to the challenges of supporting refugees, Goz Beïda was targeted in attacks between 2006 and 2008 by the Union of Forces for Democracy, a Chadian rebel group active during that period that aimed to overthrow then-President Idriss Déby.

With the outbreak of new conflicts in Sudan in 2023, Goz Beïda received a new influx of refugees. According to UNHCR, there were about 30,000 people in the Djabel refugee camp in August of that year, although this number dropped to just over 11,000 by the end of 2024.

== Geography ==
Goz Beïda is strategically located in a flat area, surrounded by five mountains and with a vast green zone that sustains rich fauna and flora. The town faces difficulties in connecting with other parts of the country, especially during the rainy season. The presence of wadis or ouadis (rivers or channels that carry water from one place to another) can cause erosion and the destruction of infrastructure and housing. The most common climate-related disasters in the region are floods and droughts.

It has a variety of housing types, including both formal (structured and recognized) and informal settlements. These informal settlements often face infrastructure problems, such as lack of planning, instability, and security, and may be located in risky areas, such as sandy or rocky terrain (dolomites and sand dunes). Living conditions for many are difficult, with a lack of food, drinking water, and basic facilities for education and sanitation.

The town also serves as a starting point for those wishing to explore the nearby Goz Beïda National Park, an important site for wildlife observation, including zebras, lions, leopards, elephants, wild boars, rhinos, and a wide variety of birds and other animals.[15] The park covers approximately 3,000 square kilometers and, although it has been affected by conflicts, poaching, and other atrocities, it remains a refuge for rare and endangered species.

== Demographics ==
Before the 1970s, Goz Beïda had a population of around 7,000 inhabitants. This number increased to about 20,000 in 1998, and officially reached 41,248 in the 2009 census, making it the tenth most populous settlement in Chad.

This significant growth was primarily driven by the tens of thousands of internally displaced Chadians, many of whom had fled due to conflicts in the country, as well as Sudanese refugees from the Darfur conflict. By 2016, it was estimated that at least 20,000 Sudanese lived in Goz Beïda and the surrounding area.

This population growth has placed pressure on local ecosystems, making them more fragile and difficult to sustain. Furthermore, the population increase has created challenges in essential areas such as potable water, electricity, stormwater drainage, public transport, and social infrastructure.

== Society ==
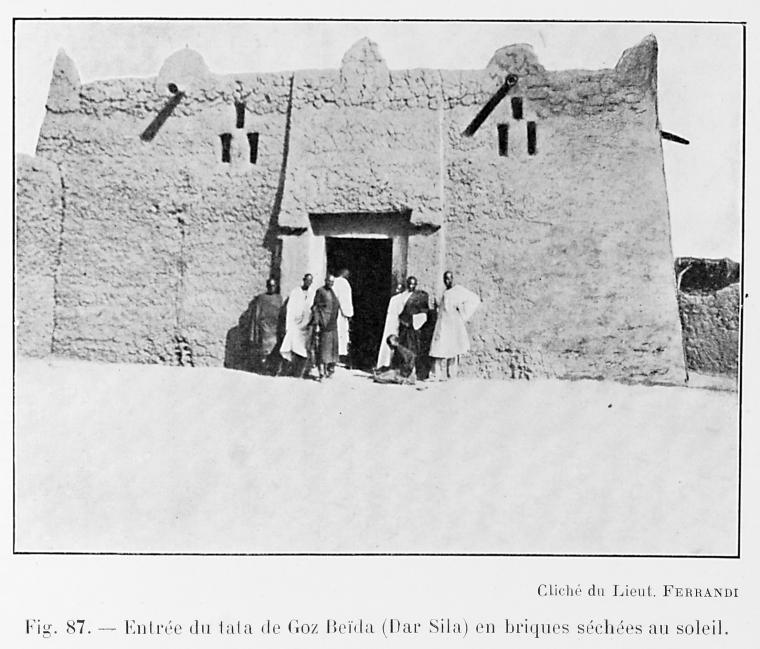
Goz Beïda's tata in 1918

The social organization of Goz Beïda is based on same blood, ethnic origin and cultural perspectives, with a strong emphasis on kinship ties and cultural practices.

The town's development has been oriented towards meeting these social needs, particularly in terms of kinship solidarity, defense, social order, and religious practices. Local cultural beliefs also regulate the separation between the sexes, influencing how public and private spaces are organized and used.

The Sultanate of Dar Sila Daju still exists informally, with Goz Beïda as its capital, and the sultan holding a predominantly religious role today, but continuing to represent tribal identity and community unity.

== See also ==
- Dar Sila
