= Energy in Chad =

The total energy consumption in Chad is of 200.00 million kWh of electric energy per year. Per capita, this is an average of 13 kWh. Chad can provide for itself completely with self-produced energy. The total production of all electric energy producing facilities is 215 m kWh, also 108% of own requirements. The rest of the self-produced energy is either exported into other countries or unused. Along with pure consumptions the production, imports and exports play an important role. Other energy sources such as natural gas or crude oil are also used.

Chad’s ability to achieve increased energy access and poverty reduction is constrained by significant challenges in the power sector. It currently only has about 125 MW of installed generation capacity to serve a population of 14.5 million people. As a result, Chad’s government is working to expand its electricity supply and encourage investment in the energy sector to stimulate the economy. Chad is endowed with the tenth-largest oil reserves in Africa, as well as wind and solar resource potential.

== See also ==
- Petroleum industry in Chad
- Chad–Cameroon Petroleum Development and Pipeline Project
