= Telephone numbers in Chad =

- Country: Chad
- Continent: Africa
- Country code: +235
- International access: 00

== List of area codes in Chad ==
LIST OF AREA CODES
Area Code	Region/Area	
22 50 00	Batha	Ati/Oum-Hadjer/N’Djaména–Bilala; Assinet/Aradj-Djombo/Djedah/Koudjourou
22 50 01 xx	Batha	Ati/Oum-Hadjer/N’Djaména–Bilala; Assinet/Aradj-Djombo/Djedah/Koudjourou
22 50 02 xx	Batha	Ati/Oum-Hadjer/N’Djaména–Bilala; Assinet/Aradj-Djombo/Djedah/Koudjourou
22 50 03 xx	Batha	Ati/Oum-Hadjer/N’Djaména–Bilala; Assinet/Aradj-Djombo/Djedah/Koudjourou
22 50 04 xx	Batha	Ati/Oum-Hadjer/N’Djaména–Bilala; Assinet/Aradj-Djombo/Djedah/Koudjourou
22 50 10 xx	Batha	Ati/Oum-Hadjer/N’Djaména–Bilala; Assinet/Aradj-Djombo/Djedah/Koudjourou
22 50 11 xx	Batha	Ati/Oum-Hadjer/N’Djaména–Bilala; Assinet/Aradj-Djombo/Djedah/Koudjourou
22 50 12 xx	Batha	Ati/Oum-Hadjer/N’Djaména–Bilala; Assinet/Aradj-Djombo/Djedah/Koudjourou
22 50 13 xx	Batha	Ati/Oum-Hadjer/N’Djaména–Bilala; Assinet/Aradj-Djombo/Djedah/Koudjourou
22 50 14 xx	Batha	Ati/Oum-Hadjer/N’Djaména–Bilala; Assinet/Aradj-Djombo/Djedah/Koudjourou
22 50 20 xx	Batha	Ati/Oum-Hadjer/N’Djaména–Bilala; Assinet/Aradj-Djombo/Djedah/Koudjourou
22 50 21 xx	Batha	Ati/Oum-Hadjer/N’Djaména–Bilala; Assinet/Aradj-Djombo/Djedah/Koudjourou
22 50 22 xx	Batha	Ati/Oum-Hadjer/N’Djaména–Bilala; Assinet/Aradj-Djombo/Djedah/Koudjourou
22 50 23 xx	Batha	Ati/Oum-Hadjer/N’Djaména–Bilala; Assinet/Aradj-Djombo/Djedah/Koudjourou
22 50 24 xx	Batha	Ati/Oum-Hadjer/N’Djaména–Bilala; Assinet/Aradj-Djombo/Djedah/Koudjourou
22 50 25 xx	B.E.T.	Faya-Larggeau/Fada/Bardaï/Zouar; Aouzou/Kalaït/Kouba-Olanga/Koro-Toro/Gour; Ouadi-Nawaï/Ounianga-Kébir/Borkou Yala
22 50 26 xx	B.E.T.	Faya-Larggeau/Fada/Bardaï/Zouar; Aouzou/Kalaït/Kouba-Olanga/Koro-Toro/Gour; Ouadi-Nawaï/Ounianga-Kébir/Borkou Yala
22 50 27 xx	B.E.T.	Faya-Larggeau/Fada/Bardaï/Zouar; Aouzou/Kalaït/Kouba-Olanga/Koro-Toro/Gour; Ouadi-Nawaï/Ounianga-Kébir/Borkou Yala
22 50 28 xx	B.E.T.	Faya-Larggeau/Fada/Bardaï/Zouar; Aouzou/Kalaït/Kouba-Olanga/Koro-Toro/Gour; Ouadi-Nawaï/Ounianga-Kébir/Borkou Yala
22 50 29 xx	B.E.T.	Faya-Larggeau/Fada/Bardaï/Zouar; Aouzou/Kalaït/Kouba-Olanga/Koro-Toro/Gour; Ouadi-Nawaï/Ounianga-Kébir/Borkou Yala
22 50 3x xx	B.E.T.	Faya-Larggeau/Fada/Bardaï/Zouar; Aouzou/Kalaït/Kouba-Olanga/Koro-Toro/Gour; Ouadi-Nawaï/Ounianga-Kébir/Borkou Yala
22 50 4x xx	Kanem	Mao/Nokou/Michémiré/Mondo/Salal; Moussoro/Chédra/Rig-Rig
22 50 5x xx	Kanem	Mao/Nokou/Michémiré/Mondo/Salal; Moussoro/Chédra/Rig-Rig
22 50 6x xx	Lac	Bol/Baga/Sola/Doum-Doum/Liwa/Ngouri
22 50 70 xx	Lac	Bol/Baga/Sola/Doum-Doum/Liwa/Ngouri
22 50 71 xx	Lac	Bol/Baga/Sola/Doum-Doum/Liwa/Ngouri
22 50 72 xx	Lac	Bol/Baga/Sola/Doum-Doum/Liwa/Ngouri
22 50 73 xx	Lac	Bol/Baga/Sola/Doum-Doum/Liwa/Ngouri
22 50 74 xx	Lac	Bol/Baga/Sola/Doum-Doum/Liwa/Ngouri
22 50 75 xx	Guera	Mongo/Bitkine/Melfi/Mangalmé/Baro/Nyergi/Eref
22 50 76 xx	Guera	Mongo/Bitkine/Melfi/Mangalmé/Baro/Nyergi/Eref
22 50 77 xx	Guera	Mongo/Bitkine/Melfi/Mangalmé/Baro/Nyergi/Eref
22 50 78 xx	Guera	Mongo/Bitkine/Melfi/Mangalmé/Baro/Nyergi/Eref
22 50 79 xx	Guera	Mongo/Bitkine/Melfi/Mangalmé/Baro/Nyergi/Eref
22 50 8x xx	Guera	Mongo/Bitkine/Melfi/Mangalmé/Baro/Nyergi/Eref
22 50 9x xx	Guera	Mongo/Bitkine/Melfi/Mangalmé/Baro/Nyergi/Eref
22 51 xx xx	N’Djamena	Goudji/Ridina
22 52 xx xx	N’Djaména Farcha poste 1 & 2	
22 53 xx xx	N’Djaména	Diguel/Walia/7ème & 8ème Arrondissement
22 54 00 xx	Dababa	Bokoro/Gama/Moïto/Ngoura
22 54 01 xx	Dababa	Bokoro/Gama/Moïto/Ngoura
22 54 02 xx	Dababa	Bokoro/Gama/Moïto/Ngoura
22 54 03 xx	Dababa	Bokoro/Gama/Moïto/Ngoura
22 54 04 xx	Dababa	Bokoro/Gama/Moïto/Ngoura
22 54 05 xx	Dababa	Bokoro/Gama/Moïto/Ngoura
22 54 06 xx	Hadjer Lamis	Massaguet/Linian/Karal/Loumian; Mandélia/Koundoul/Mani/Maïlao/Massakori
22 54 07 xx	Hadjer Lamis	Massaguet/Linian/Karal/Loumian; Mandélia/Koundoul/Mani/Maïlao/Massakori
22 54 08 xx	Hadjer Lamis	Massaguet/Linian/Karal/Loumian; Mandélia/Koundoul/Mani/Maïlao/Massakori
22 54 09 xx	Hadjer Lamis	Massaguet/Linian/Karal/Loumian; Mandélia/Koundoul/Mani/Maïlao/Massakori
22 54 10 xx	Hadjer Lamis	Massaguet/Linian/Karal/Loumian; Mandélia/Koundoul/Mani/Maïlao/Massakori
22 54 11 xx	Hadjer Lamis	Massaguet/Linian/Karal/Loumian; Mandélia/Koundoul/Mani/Maïlao/Massakori
22 54 12 xx	Hadjer Lamis	Massaguet/Linian/Karal/Loumian; Mandélia/Koundoul/Mani/Maïlao/Massakori
22 54 13 xx	Hadjer Lamis	Massaguet/Linian/Karal/Loumian; Mandélia/Koundoul/Mani/Maïlao/Massakori
22 54 14 xx	Hadjer Lamis	Massaguet/Linian/Karal/Loumian; Mandélia/Koundoul/Mani/Maïlao/Massakori
22 54 15 xx	Hadjer Lamis	Massaguet/Linian/Karal/Loumian; Mandélia/Koundoul/Mani/Maïlao/Massakori
22 54 16 xx	Baguirmi	Massenya/Bosso/Mbarley/Dour Bali; Bougeoir/Koubba/Mogo/Bah-Illi
22 54 17 xx	Baguirmi	Massenya/Bosso/Mbarley/Dour Bali; Bougeoir/Koubba/Mogo/Bah-Illi
22 54 18 xx	Baguirmi	Massenya/Bosso/Mbarley/Dour Bali; Bougeoir/Koubba/Mogo/Bah-Illi
22 54 19 xx	Baguirmi	Massenya/Bosso/Mbarley/Dour Bali; Bougeoir/Koubba/Mogo/Bah-Illi
22 54 20 xx	Baguirmi	Massenya/Bosso/Mbarley/Dour Bali; Bougeoir/Koubba/Mogo/Bah-Illi
22 54 21 xx	Baguirmi	Massenya/Bosso/Mbarley/Dour Bali; Bougeoir/Koubba/Mogo/Bah-Illi
22 54 22 xx	Baguirmi	Massenya/Bosso/Mbarley/Dour Bali; Bougeoir/Koubba/Mogo/Bah-Illi
22 54 23 xx	Baguirmi	Massenya/Bosso/Mbarley/Dour Bali; Bougeoir/Koubba/Mogo/Bah-Illi
22 54 24 xx	Baguirmi	Massenya/Bosso/Mbarley/Dour Bali; Bougeoir/Koubba/Mogo/Bah-Illi
22 68 0x xx	Moyen Chari	Sarh/Kyabé/Moïssala/Koumra/Bédjondo; Bouna/Goundi/Bohobé/Boum-Kébir/Roro; Maro/Dembo/Korbol/Bédaya/Békamba
22 68 1x xx	Moyen Chari	Sarh/Kyabé/Moïssala/Koumra/Bédjondo; Bouna/Goundi/Bohobé/Boum-Kébir/Roro; Maro/Dembo/Korbol/Bédaya/Békamba
22 68 2x xx	Moyen Chari	Sarh/Kyabé/Moïssala/Koumra/Bédjondo; Bouna/Goundi/Bohobé/Boum-Kébir/Roro; Maro/Dembo/Korbol/Bédaya/Békamba
22 68 3x xx	Moyen Chari	Sarh/Kyabé/Moïssala/Koumra/Bédjondo; Bouna/Goundi/Bohobé/Boum-Kébir/Roro; Maro/Dembo/Korbol/Bédaya/Békamba
22 68 40 xx	Moyen Chari	Sarh/Kyabé/Moïssala/Koumra/Bédjondo; Bouna/Goundi/Bohobé/Boum-Kébir/Roro; Maro/Dembo/Korbol/Bédaya/Békamba
22 68 41 xx	Moyen Chari	Sarh/Kyabé/Moïssala/Koumra/Bédjondo; Bouna/Goundi/Bohobé/Boum-Kébir/Roro; Maro/Dembo/Korbol/Bédaya/Békamba
22 68 42 xx	Moyen Chari	Sarh/Kyabé/Moïssala/Koumra/Bédjondo; Bouna/Goundi/Bohobé/Boum-Kébir/Roro; Maro/Dembo/Korbol/Bédaya/Békamba
22 68 43 xx	Moyen Chari	Sarh/Kyabé/Moïssala/Koumra/Bédjondo; Bouna/Goundi/Bohobé/Boum-Kébir/Roro; Maro/Dembo/Korbol/Bédaya/Békamba
22 68 44 xx	Moyen Chari	Sarh/Kyabé/Moïssala/Koumra/Bédjondo; Bouna/Goundi/Bohobé/Boum-Kébir/Roro; Maro/Dembo/Korbol/Bédaya/Békamba
22 68 45 xx	Salamat	Am-Timan/Aboudéïa/Haraze; Manguey/Djouna Takalaou/Darasna
22 68 46 xx	Salamat	Am-Timan/Aboudéïa/Haraze; Manguey/Djouna Takalaou/Darasna
22 68 47 xx	Salamat	Am-Timan/Aboudéïa/Haraze; Manguey/Djouna Takalaou/Darasna
22 68 48 xx	Salamat	Am-Timan/Aboudéïa/Haraze; Manguey/Djouna Takalaou/Darasna
22 68 49 xx	Salamat	Am-Timan/Aboudéïa/Haraze; Manguey/Djouna Takalaou/Darasna
22 68 5x xx	Salamat	Am-Timan/Aboudéïa/Haraze; Manguey/Djouna Takalaou/Darasna
22 68 6x xx	Ouaddai	Abéché/Abougoudam/Am-Dam/Chokoyan; Abdi/Adré/Goz-Beïda/Koukou Angara Tissé/Addé
22 68 7x xx	Ouaddai	Abéché/Abougoudam/Am-Dam/Chokoyan; Abdi/Adré/Goz-Beïda/Koukou Angara Tissé/Addé
22 68 8x xx	Ouaddai	Abéché/Abougoudam/Am-Dam/Chokoyan; Abdi/Adré/Goz-Beïda/Koukou Angara Tissé/Addé
22 68 9x xx	Biltine	Biltine/Am-zoer/Arada/Guereda/Iriba; Koulbous/Tiné/Mayana
22 69 0x xx	Logon Occidental	Mbaïnamar/Moundou/Benoye/Krim-Krim/Déli; Tapol/Laokassi/Béladja/Bébalem/Saar/Bao
22 69 1x xx	Logon Occidental	Mbaïnamar/Moundou/Benoye/Krim-Krim/Déli; Tapol/Laokassi/Béladja/Bébalem/Saar/Bao
22 69 2x xx	Logon Occidental	Mbaïnamar/Moundou/Benoye/Krim-Krim/Déli; Tapol/Laokassi/Béladja/Bébalem/Saar/Bao
22 69 30 xx	Logon Occidental	Mbaïnamar/Moundou/Benoye/Krim-Krim/Déli; Tapol/Laokassi/Béladja/Bébalem/Saar/Bao
22 69 31 xx	Logon Occidental	Mbaïnamar/Moundou/Benoye/Krim-Krim/Déli; Tapol/Laokassi/Béladja/Bébalem/Saar/Bao
22 69 32 xx	Logon Occidental	Mbaïnamar/Moundou/Benoye/Krim-Krim/Déli; Tapol/Laokassi/Béladja/Bébalem/Saar/Bao
22 69 33 xx	Logon Occidental	Mbaïnamar/Moundou/Benoye/Krim-Krim/Déli; Tapol/Laokassi/Béladja/Bébalem/Saar/Bao
22 69 34 xx	Logon Occidental	Mbaïnamar/Moundou/Benoye/Krim-Krim/Déli; Tapol/Laokassi/Béladja/Bébalem/Saar/Bao
22 69 35 xx	Logone Oriental	Doba/Bébidja/Bébotto/Bodo/Goré/Kara/Donian; Yamodo/Mbaïbokoum/Mbaïkoro/Bessao/Lamanaye
22 69 36 xx	Logone Oriental	Doba/Bébidja/Bébotto/Bodo/Goré/Kara/Donian; Yamodo/Mbaïbokoum/Mbaïkoro/Bessao/Lamanaye
22 69 37 xx	Logone Oriental	Doba/Bébidja/Bébotto/Bodo/Goré/Kara/Donian; Yamodo/Mbaïbokoum/Mbaïkoro/Bessao/Lamanaye
22 69 38 xx	Logone Oriental	Doba/Bébidja/Bébotto/Bodo/Goré/Kara/Donian; Yamodo/Mbaïbokoum/Mbaïkoro/Bessao/Lamanaye
22 69 39 xx	Logone Oriental	Doba/Bébidja/Bébotto/Bodo/Goré/Kara/Donian; Yamodo/Mbaïbokoum/Mbaïkoro/Bessao/Lamanaye
22 69 4x xx	Logone Oriental	Doba/Bébidja/Bébotto/Bodo/Goré/Kara/Donian; Yamodo/Mbaïbokoum/Mbaïkoro/Bessao/Lamanaye
22 69 5x xx	Logone Oriental	Doba/Bébidja/Bébotto/Bodo/Goré/Kara/Donian; Yamodo/Mbaïbokoum/Mbaïkoro/Bessao/Lamanaye
22 69 6x xx	Mayo Kebbi	Bongor/Guelendeng/Kim/Rigadja/Pala/Gagal; Lagon/Léré/Torok/Lamé/Guigou/Gounougaya/Binder; Fianga/Moulkou/Koyom/Eré/Kolobo/Djoumane
22 69 7x xx	Mayo Kebbi	Bongor/Guelendeng/Kim/Rigadja/Pala/Gagal; Lagon/Léré/Torok/Lamé/Guigou/Gounougaya/Binder; Fianga/Moulkou/Koyom/Eré/Kolobo/Djoumane
22 69 8x xx	Mayo Kebbi	Bongor/Guelendeng/Kim/Rigadja/Pala/Gagal; Lagon/Léré/Torok/Lamé/Guigou/Gounougaya/Binder; Fianga/Moulkou/Koyom/Eré/Kolobo/Djoumane
22 69 90 xx	Mayo Kebbi	Bongor/Guelendeng/Kim/Rigadja/Pala/Gagal; Lagon/Léré/Torok/Lamé/Guigou/Gounougaya/Binder; Fianga/Moulkou/Koyom/Eré/Kolobo/Djoumane
22 69 91 xx	Mayo Kebbi	Bongor/Guelendeng/Kim/Rigadja/Pala/Gagal; Lagon/Léré/Torok/Lamé/Guigou/Gounougaya/Binder; Fianga/Moulkou/Koyom/Eré/Kolobo/Djoumane
22 69 92 xx	Mayo Kebbi	Bongor/Guelendeng/Kim/Rigadja/Pala/Gagal; Lagon/Léré/Torok/Lamé/Guigou/Gounougaya/Binder; Fianga/Moulkou/Koyom/Eré/Kolobo/Djoumane
22 69 93 xx	Tandjile	Deressia/Dono-manga/Guidari/Ndam/Kélo Béré; Dafra/Delbian/Laï
22 69 94 xx	Tandjile	Deressia/Dono-manga/Guidari/Ndam/Kélo Béré; Dafra/Delbian/Laï
22 69 95 xx	Tandjile	Deressia/Dono-manga/Guidari/Ndam/Kélo Béré; Dafra/Delbian/Laï
22 69 96 xx	Tandjile	Deressia/Dono-manga/Guidari/Ndam/Kélo Béré; Dafra/Delbian/Laï
22 69 97 xx	Tandjile	Deressia/Dono-manga/Guidari/Ndam/Kélo Béré; Dafra/Delbian/Laï
22 69 98 xx	Tandjile	Deressia/Dono-manga/Guidari/Ndam/Kélo Béré; Dafra/Delbian/Laï
22 69 99 xx	Tandjile	Deressia/Dono-manga/Guidari/Ndam/Kélo Béré; Dafra/Delbian/Laï
