= Chad =

Country in Central Africa

Republic of Chad
(in official languages)
Arabic	جمهورية تشاد; Jumhūriyyat Tshād
French	République du Tchad
- Flag Coat of arms
- Motto: "Unité, Travail, Progrès" (French); "Unity, Work, Progress"
- Anthem: "La Tchadienne" (French); "The Song of Chad"
- Capital and largest city: N'Djamena; 12°06′19″N 15°02′41″E
- Official languages: French; Arabic
- Religion (2020): 55.1% Islam; 41.1% Christianity; 2.4% no religion; 1.3% Animism; 0.1% others
- Demonym: Chadian
- Government: Presidential republic
  - President: Mahamat Déby
  - Prime Minister: Allamaye Halina
- Legislature: Bicameral parliament
  - Upper house: Senate
  - Lower house: National Assembly

Independence from France
  - Autonomy granted: 28 November 1958
  - Sovereign state: 11 August 1960

Area
  - Total: 1,280,000 km^{2} (490,000 sq mi) (20th)
  - Water (%): 1.9

Population
  - 2026 estimate: ▲20,031,602 (64th)
  - Density: 15.1/km^{2} (39.1/sq mi) (218th)
- GDP (PPP): 2026 estimate
  - Total: ▲$63.070 billion (147th)
  - Per capita: ▲$3,240 (179th)
- GDP (nominal): 2026 estimate
  - Total: ▲$23.560 billion (145th)
  - Per capita: ▲$1,210 (183rd)
- Gini (2022): ▼37.4 medium inequality
- HDI (2023): ▲0.416 low (190th)
- Currency: Central African CFA franc (XAF)
- Time zone: UTC+01:00 (WAT)
- Calling code: +235
- ISO 3166 code: TD
- Internet TLD: .td

Chad, (Note: /tʃæd/ CHAD: French: Tchad, pronounced [tʃa(d)]; Arabic: تشاد, romanised: Tshād, Arabic pronunciation: [tʃaːd]) officially the Republic of Chad, (Note: French: République du Tchad; Arabic: جمهورية تْشَاد, romanised: Jumhūriyyat Tshād) is a landlocked country in Central Africa. It is bordered by Libya to the north, Sudan to the east, the Central African Republic to the south, Cameroon to the southwest, Nigeria to the southwest (at Lake Chad), and Niger to the west. Chad has a population of 20 million, of which 1.6 million live in the capital and largest city of N'Djamena. With a total area of around 1,300,000 km^{2} (500,000 sq mi), Chad is the fifth-largest country in Africa and the twentieth largest nation by area.

With over 200 ethnic and linguistic groups, the official languages are French and Arabic, with French being the lingua franca and language of government and education. Islam (55.1%) and Christianity (41.1%) are the main practiced religions.

Beginning in the 7th millennium BC, humans moved into the Chadian basin in great numbers. By the end of the 1st millennium AD, a series of states and empires had risen and fallen in Chad's Sahelian strip, each focused on controlling the trans-Saharan trade routes that passed through the region. France conquered the territory by 1920 and incorporated it as part of French Equatorial Africa. In 1960, Chad obtained independence under the leadership of François Tombalbaye. Resentment towards his policies in the Muslim north culminated in the eruption of a long-lasting civil war in 1965. In 1979 the rebels conquered the capital and put an end to the south's hegemony. The rebel commanders then fought amongst themselves until President Hissène Habré defeated his rivals. The Chadian–Libyan conflict erupted in 1978 which stopped in 1987 with a French military intervention. Habré was overthrown in turn in 1990 by his general Idriss Déby. With French support, a modernisation of the Chadian National Army was initiated in 1991. From 2003, the Darfur crisis in Sudan spilled over the border and destabilised the nation. Already poor, the nation struggled to accommodate over a million Sudanese refugees in eastern Chad.

While many political parties participated in the National Assembly, power lay firmly in the hands of the Patriotic Salvation Movement during the presidency of Déby, whose rule was described as authoritarian. After Déby was killed by FACT rebels in April 2021, the Transitional Military Council led by his son Mahamat Déby assumed control of the government and dissolved the Assembly. One of the world's least developed countries, Chad remains plagued by political violence and recurrent attempted coups d'état. Chad ranks the 4th lowest in the Human Development Index and is among the poorest and most corrupt countries. Most of its inhabitants live in poverty as subsistence herders and farmers. Since 2003 crude oil has become the country's primary source of export earnings. Chad has a poor human rights record.

== History ==
=== Early history ===
In the 7th millennium BC, ecological conditions in the northern half of Chadian territory favoured human settlement, and its population increased considerably. Some of the most important African archaeological sites are found in Chad, mainly in the Borkou-Ennedi-Tibesti Region; some date to earlier than 2000 BC.

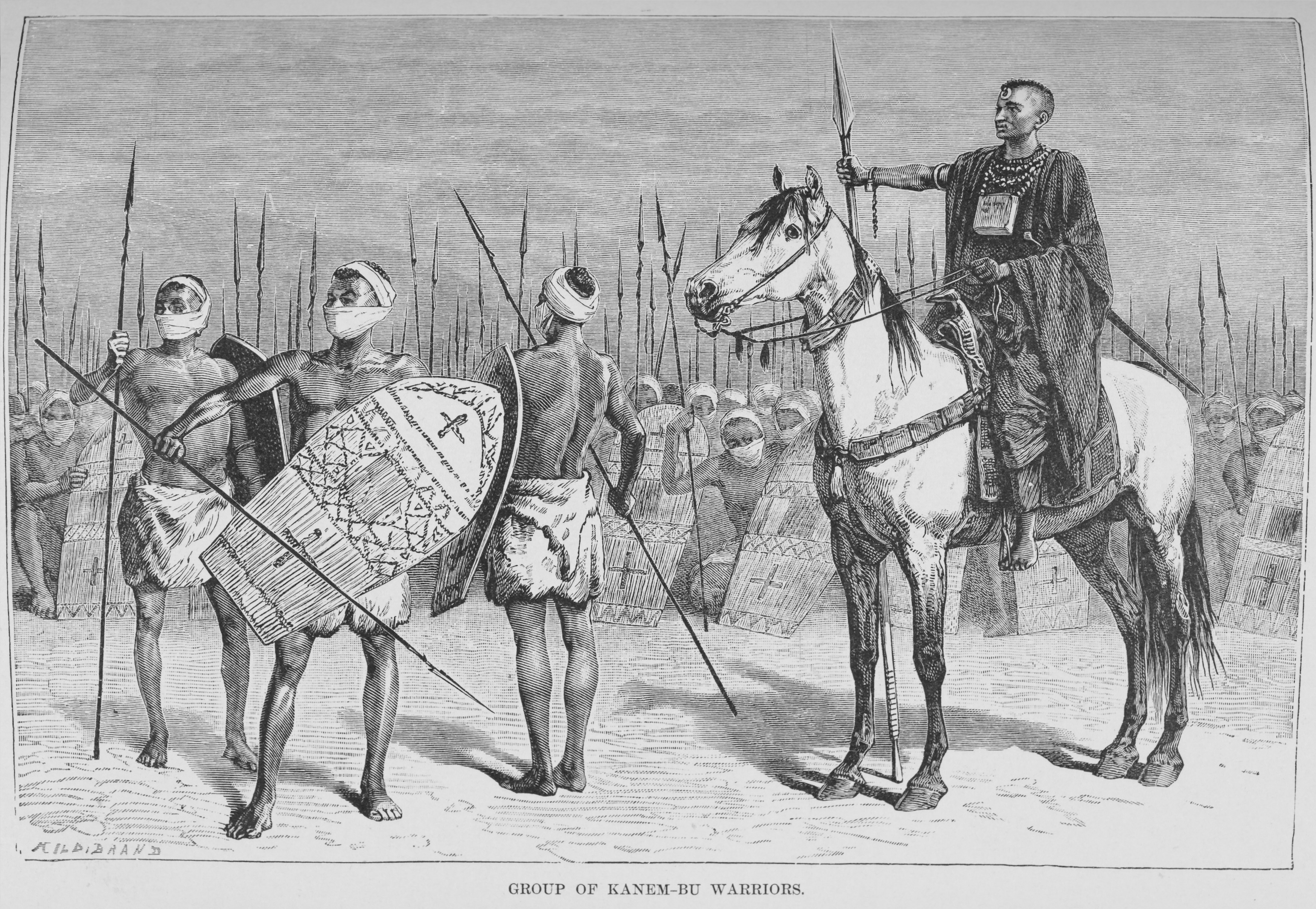
Group of Kanem-Bu warriors. The Kanem–Bornu Empire controlled almost all of what is today Chad.

For more than 2,000 years, the Chad Basin has been inhabited by agricultural and sedentary people. The region became a crossroads of civilisations. The earliest of these was the legendary Sao, known from artefacts and oral histories. The Sao fell to the Kanem Empire, the first and longest-lasting of the empires that developed in Chad's Sahelian strip by the end of the 1st millennium AD. The power of Kanem and its successors was based on control of the trans-Saharan trade routes that passed through the region. Increasing Islamisation of Kanem was evident from the 11th century onwards, and Kanem had developed into a literate society by the 12th century, when the scribes of the empire are recorded to have developed an original script style, the barnāwī.

Kanem's expansion peaked during the long reign of Mai Dunama Dabbalemi (c. 1221–1259), leaving the empire as the most powerful state in Central Africa by the time of his death. By the end of the 14th century, internal struggles and external attacks had torn Kanem apart. Finally, around 1396, the Bulala invaders forced Mai Umar Idrismi to relocate the imperial centre to Bornu.

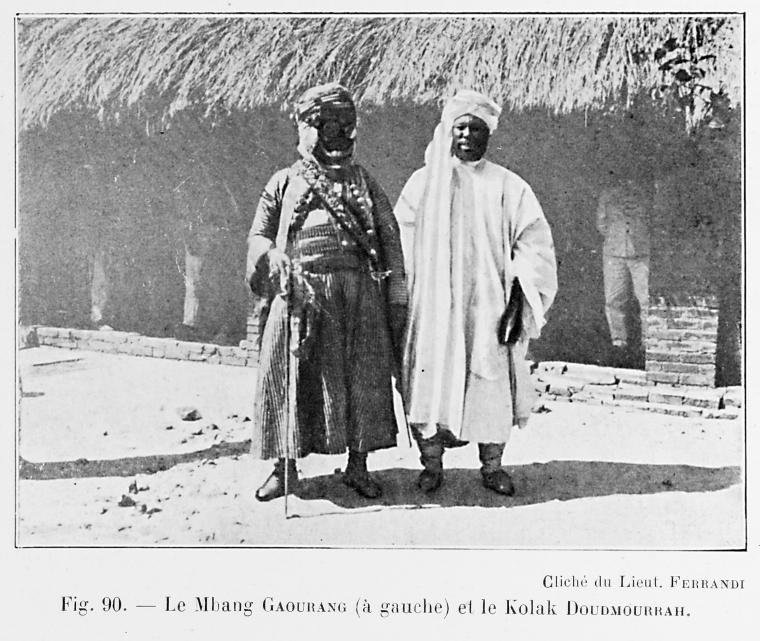
The Mbang Abd ar Rahman Gwaranga (left) with Wadai's Dud Murra (right)

Two other states in the region, the Sultanate of Bagirmi and the Wadai Sultanate, emerged in the 16th and 17th centuries. Bagirmi adopted Islam during the reign of Abdullah IV (1568–1598) and was in a tributary relationship with Kanem-Bornu in the 17th and 18th centuries, and then with Wadai in the 19th century. Wadai, initially non-Muslim, was taken over early in the 17th century by Abd al Karim, who established an Islamic sultanate. Muhammad Sabun (1804-1815) established a new trade route to the north and minted his own currency, and Muhammad Sharif (1843 - 1858) subjugated Bagirmi and successfully resisted French colonization. These two states never extended their control to the southern grasslands except to raid for slaves. In Kanem, about a third of the population were slaves.

=== French colonial period (1900–1960) ===
French colonial expansion led to the creation of the Territoire Militaire des Pays et Protectorats du Tchad in 1900. By 1920, France had secured full control of the colony and incorporated it as part of French Equatorial Africa. French rule was characterised by an absence of policies to unify the territory and sluggish modernisation compared to other French colonies.

The French primarily viewed the colony as an unimportant source of untrained labour and raw cotton; France introduced large-scale cotton production in 1929. The colonial administration was critically understaffed and had to rely on the dregs of the French civil service. Only the Sara people of the south were governed effectively; French presence in the Islamic north and east was nominal. The educational system was affected by this neglect.

The French administration's focus on cotton led to the formation of a precarious underclass of poorly-paid rural workers, a decrease in food production and even to famines in some areas. Tensions between farmers and elites culminated in the 1952 Bébalem massacre by colonial authorities.

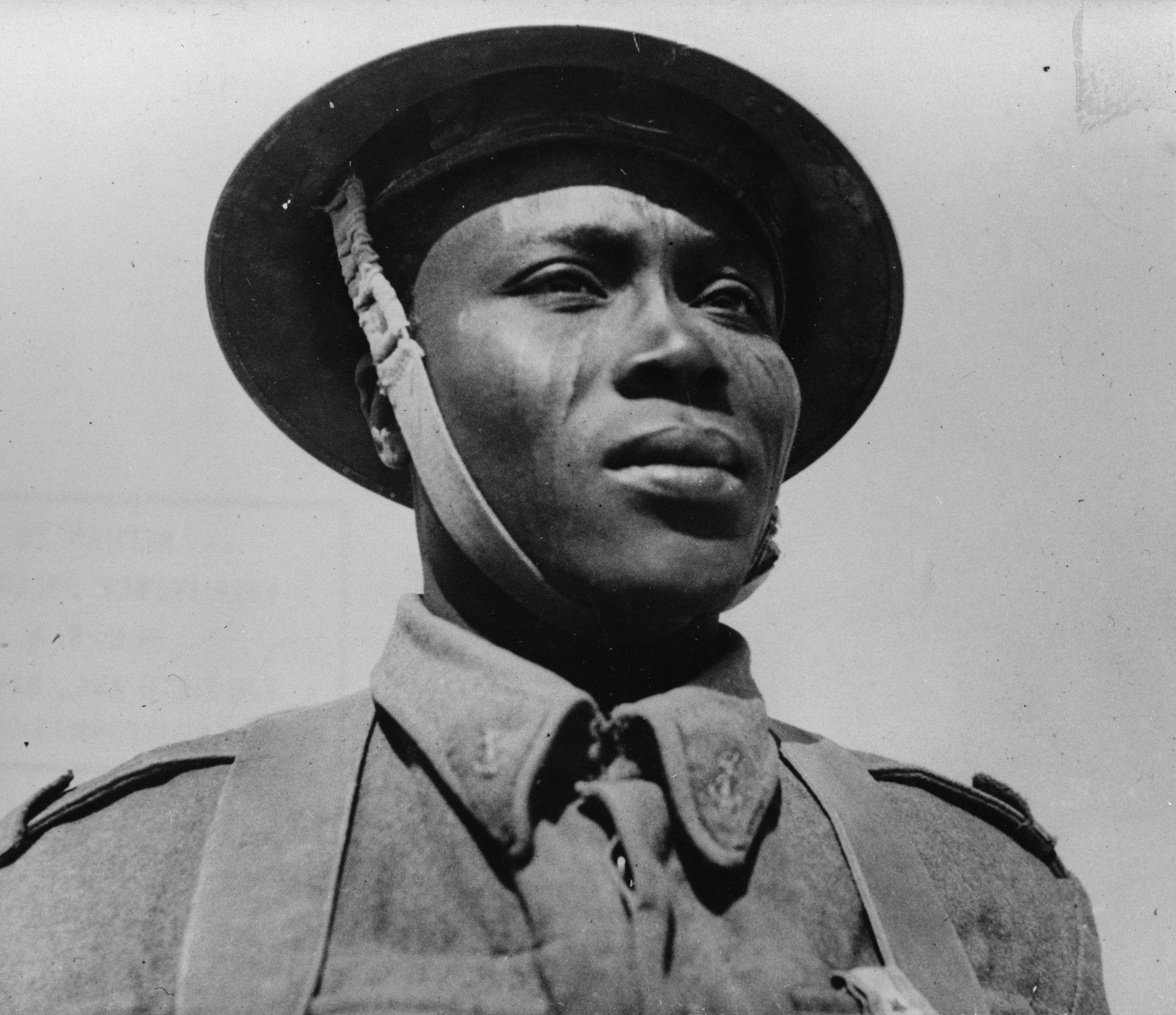
A Chadian soldier fighting for Free France during World War II. The Free French Forces included 15,000 soldiers from Chad.

After World War II, France granted Chad the status of overseas territory and its inhabitants the right to elect representatives to the National Assembly and a Chadian assembly. The largest political party was the Chadian Progressive Party (French: Parti Progressiste Tchadien, PPT), based in the southern half of the colony. Chad was granted independence on 11 August 1960 with the PPT's leader, François Tombalbaye, an ethnic Sara, as its first president.

=== Tombalbaye rule (1960–1979) ===
In 1962 Tombalbaye banned opposition parties and established a one-party system. Tombalbaye's autocratic rule and insensitive mismanagement exacerbated inter-ethnic tensions. In 1965 Muslims in the north, led by the National Liberation Front of Chad (French: Front de libération nationale du Tchad, FRONILAT), began a civil war. Becoming gradually more erratic, Tombalbaye's regime alienated even his southern base of support, notably through the forced introduction of yondo (ritual scarring) for public servants and the 1973 assassination of expatriate dissident Outel Bono in Paris. Tombalbaye was overthrown and killed in 1975, but the insurgency continued. In 1979 the rebel factions led by Hissène Habré took the capital, and central authority in the country collapsed. Armed factions, many from the north's rebellion, contended for power.

=== Civil war (1979–1987) ===
The disintegration of Chad caused the collapse of France's position in the country. Libya moved to fill the power vacuum and became involved in Chad's civil war. This ended in disaster in 1987; the French-supported President Habré, evoked a united response from Chadians of a kind never seen before and forced the Libyan army off Chadian soil.

=== Dictatorship of Habré (1987–1990) ===
Habré consolidated his dictatorship through a power system that relied on corruption and violence with thousands of people estimated to have been killed under his rule. The president favoured his own Toubou ethnic group and discriminated against his former allies, the Zaghawa. His general, Idriss Déby, overthrew him in 1990. Attempts to prosecute Habré led to his placement under house arrest in Senegal in 2005; in 2013, Habré was formally charged with war crimes committed during his rule. In May 2016, he was found guilty of human-rights abuses, including rape, sexual slavery, and ordering the killing of 40,000 people, and he was sentenced to life in prison.

=== Déby dynasty and second Civil War (1990–present) ===
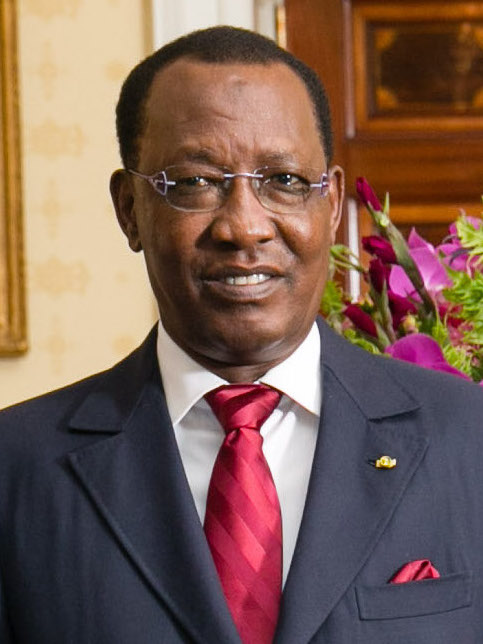
Despite internal political opposition, coup attempts, and a civil war, Idriss Déby continuously ruled Chad from 1990 until his death in 2021.

Déby attempted to reconcile the rebel groups and reintroduced multiparty politics. A constitutional referendum led to the 1996 constitution, and Déby easily won the 1996 presidential election. He won a second term five years later. Oil exploitation began in 2003, bringing with it hopes that Chad would at last have some chances of peace and prosperity. Instead, internal dissent worsened, and a new civil war broke out. Déby unilaterally modified the constitution to remove the two-term limit on the presidency; this caused an uproar among the civil society and opposition parties.

In 2006 Déby won a third mandate in elections that the opposition boycotted. Ethnic violence in eastern Chad has increased; the United Nations High Commissioner for Refugees has warned that a genocide like the war in Darfur may occur in Chad. In 2006 and in 2008 rebel forces attempted to take the capital by force but failed on both occasions. An agreement for the restoration of harmony between Chad and Sudan, signed 15 January 2010, marked the end of a five-year war and leading to the Chadian rebels from Sudan returning home, the opening of the Chad–Sudan border after seven years of closure, and the deployment of a joint force to secure the border. In May 2013, security forces in Chad foiled a coup against Déby that had been in preparation for several months.

Chad is one of the leading partners in a West African coalition in the fight against Boko Haram and other Islamist militants. Déby died on 20 April 2021 following an incursion in the north by the FACT group. Déby's son, Mahamat Déby, was named interim president by a Transitional Council of military officers. The transitional council replaced the 2018 constitution with a charter, granting Mahamat Déby the powers of the presidency and naming him head of the armed forces. On 23 May 2024, Mahamat Idriss Déby was sworn in as President of Chad after the disputed 6 May election.

== Geography ==
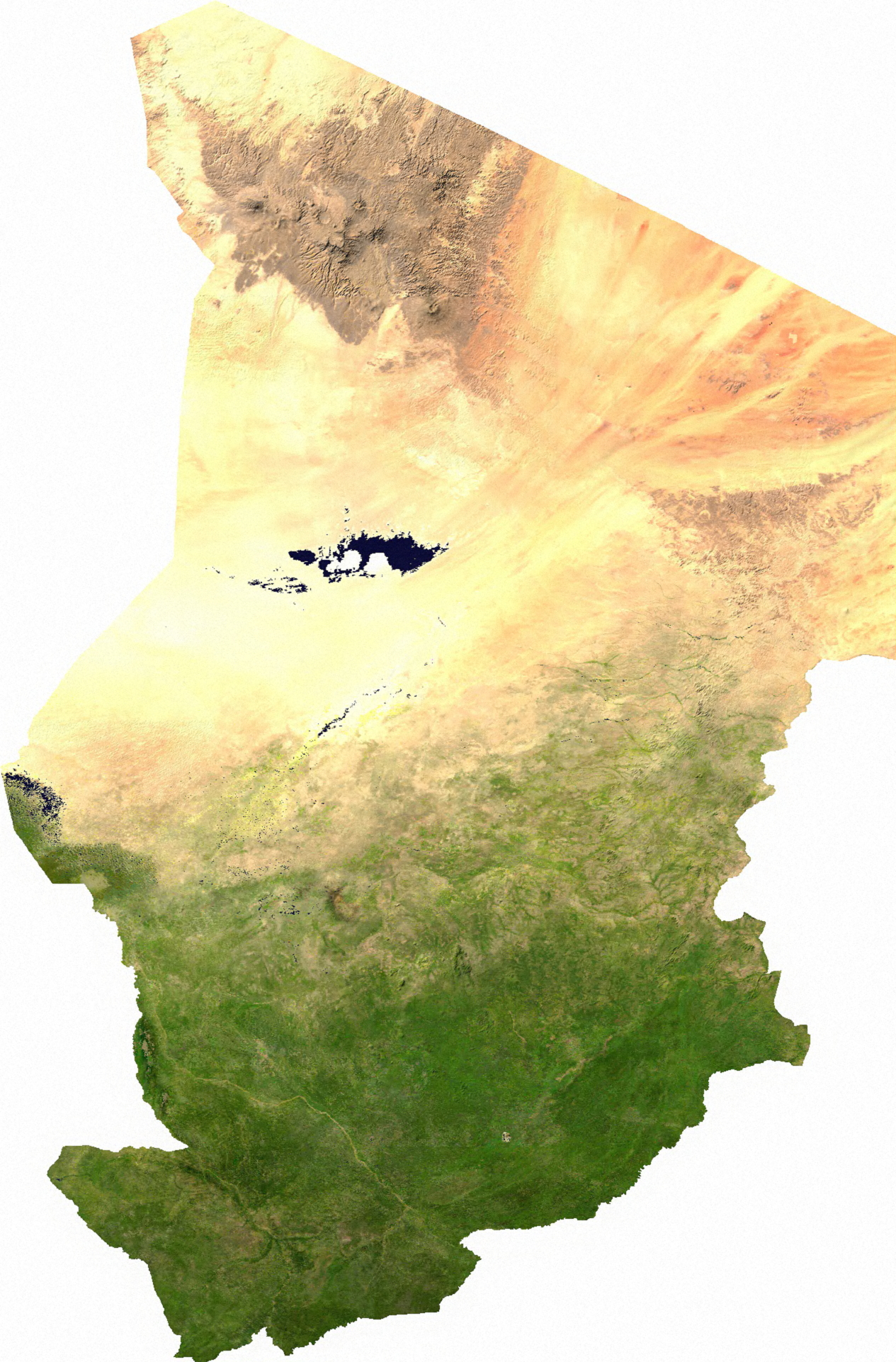
Chad is divided into three distinct zones, the Sudanian savanna in the south, the Sahara in the north, and the Sahelian belt in the centre.

Chad is a landlocked country spanning north-central Africa. It covers an area of 1,284,000 square kilometres (496,000 sq mi), lying between latitudes 7° and 24°N, and 13° and 24°E, and is the twentieth-largest country in the world. It is bounded to the north by Libya, to the east by Sudan, to the west by Niger, Nigeria and Cameroon, and to the south by the Central African Republic. The capital is 1,060 kilometres (660 mi) from the nearest seaport, Douala, Cameroon. Because of this distance from the sea and the largely desert climate, Chad is sometimes referred to as the "Dead Heart of Africa".

The dominant physical structure is a wide basin bounded to the north and east by the Ennedi Plateau and Tibesti Mountains, which include Emi Koussi, a dormant volcano that reaches 3,414 metres (11,201 ft) above sea level. Lake Chad, after which the country is named (and which in turn takes its name from the Kanuri word for "lake"), is the remains of an immense lake that occupied 330,000 square kilometres (130,000 sq mi) of the Chad Basin 7,000 years ago. Although in the 21st century it covers 17,806 square kilometres (6,875 sq mi), and its surface area is subject to heavy seasonal fluctuations, the lake is Africa's second-largest wetland.

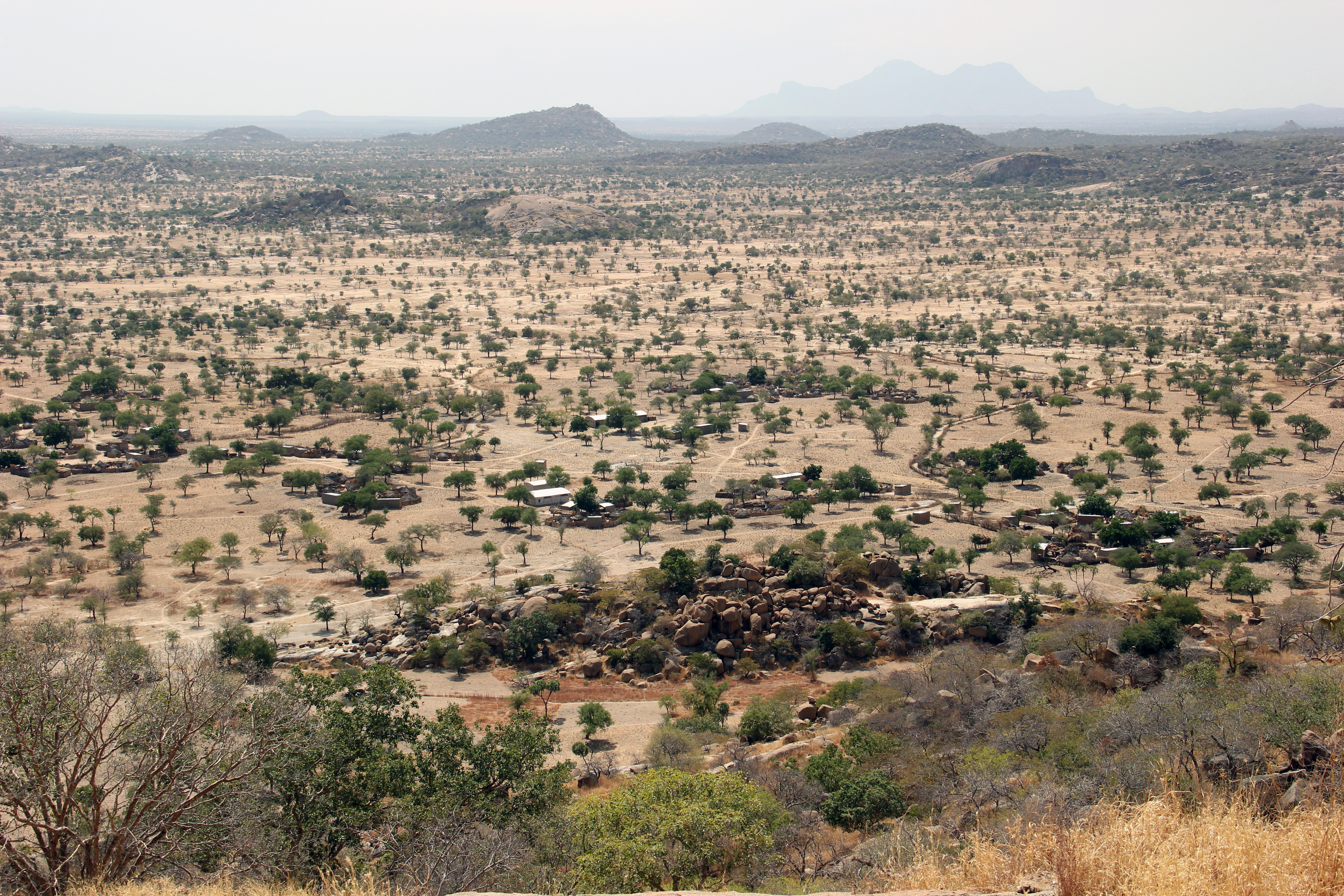
Landscape in Guéra in south-central Chad

Chad contains six terrestrial ecoregions: East Sudanian savanna, Sahelian Acacia savanna, Lake Chad flooded savanna, East Saharan montane xeric woodlands, South Saharan steppe and woodlands, and Tibesti-Jebel Uweinat montane xeric woodlands. Tall grasses and extensive marshes make it favourable for birds, reptiles, and large mammals. Major rivers—the Chari, Logone and their tributaries—flow through the southern savannas from the southeast into Lake Chad.

Each year a tropical weather system known as the intertropical front crosses Chad from south to north, bringing a wet season that lasts from May to October in the south, and from June to September in the Sahel. Variations in local rainfall create three major geographical zones. The Sahara lies in the country's northern third. Yearly precipitations throughout this belt are under 50 millimetres (2.0 in); only occasional spontaneous palm groves survive, all of them south of the Tropic of Cancer.

The Sahara gives way to a Sahelian belt in central Chad; precipitation there varies from 300 to 600 mm (11.8 to 23.6 in) per year. In the Sahel, a steppe of thorny bushes (mostly acacias) gradually gives way to the south to East Sudanian savanna. Yearly rainfall in this belt is over 900 mm (35.4 in).

=== Wildlife ===
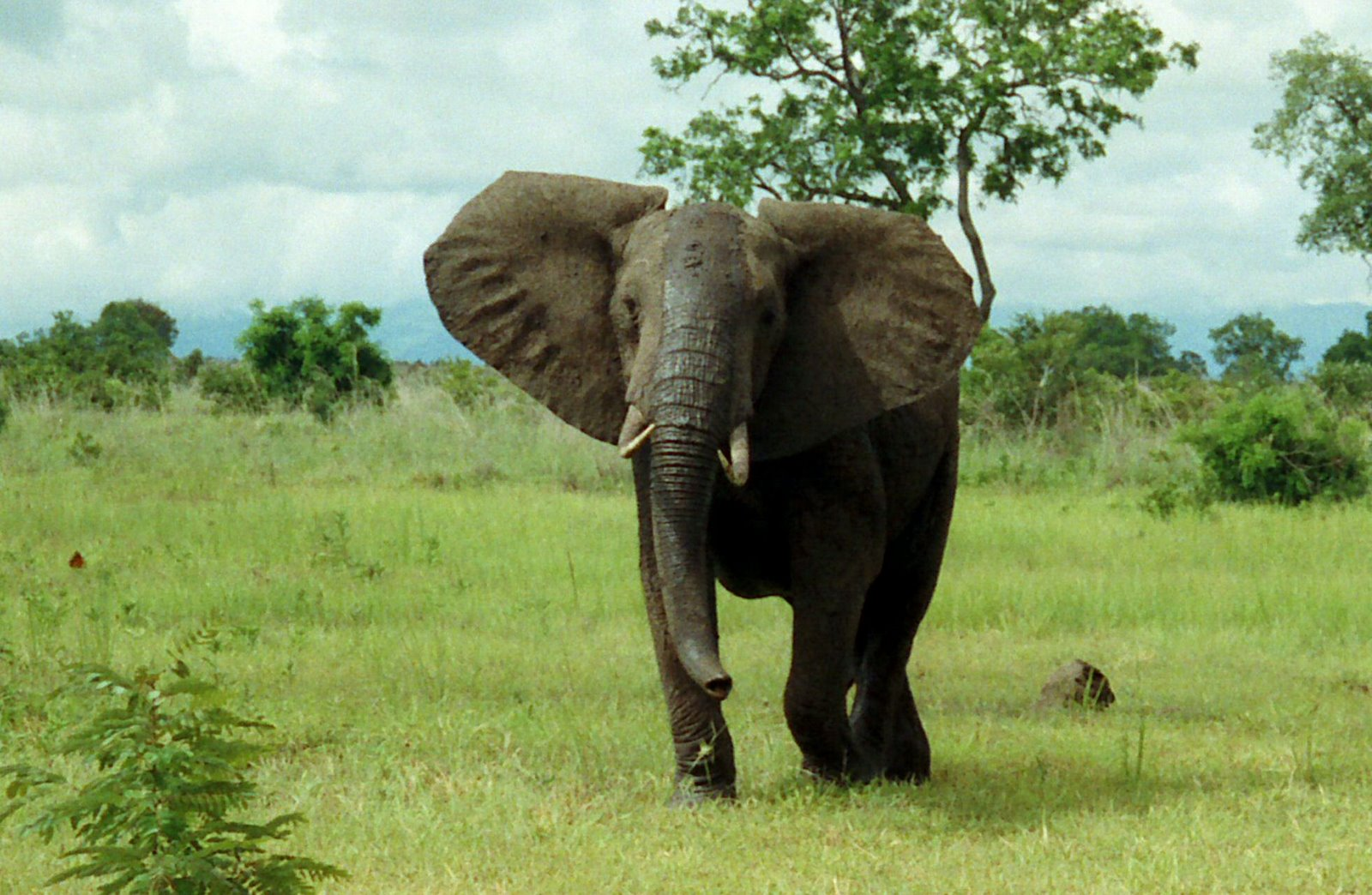
An African bush elephant

The animal and plant life correspond to the three climatic zones. In the Saharan region, the only flora is the date palm groves of the oasis. Palms and acacia trees grow in the Sahelian region. The southern, or Sudanic, zone consists of broad grasslands or prairies suitable for grazing. There are at least 134 species of mammals, 509 species of birds (354 species of residents and 155 migrants), and over 1,600 species of plants throughout the country.

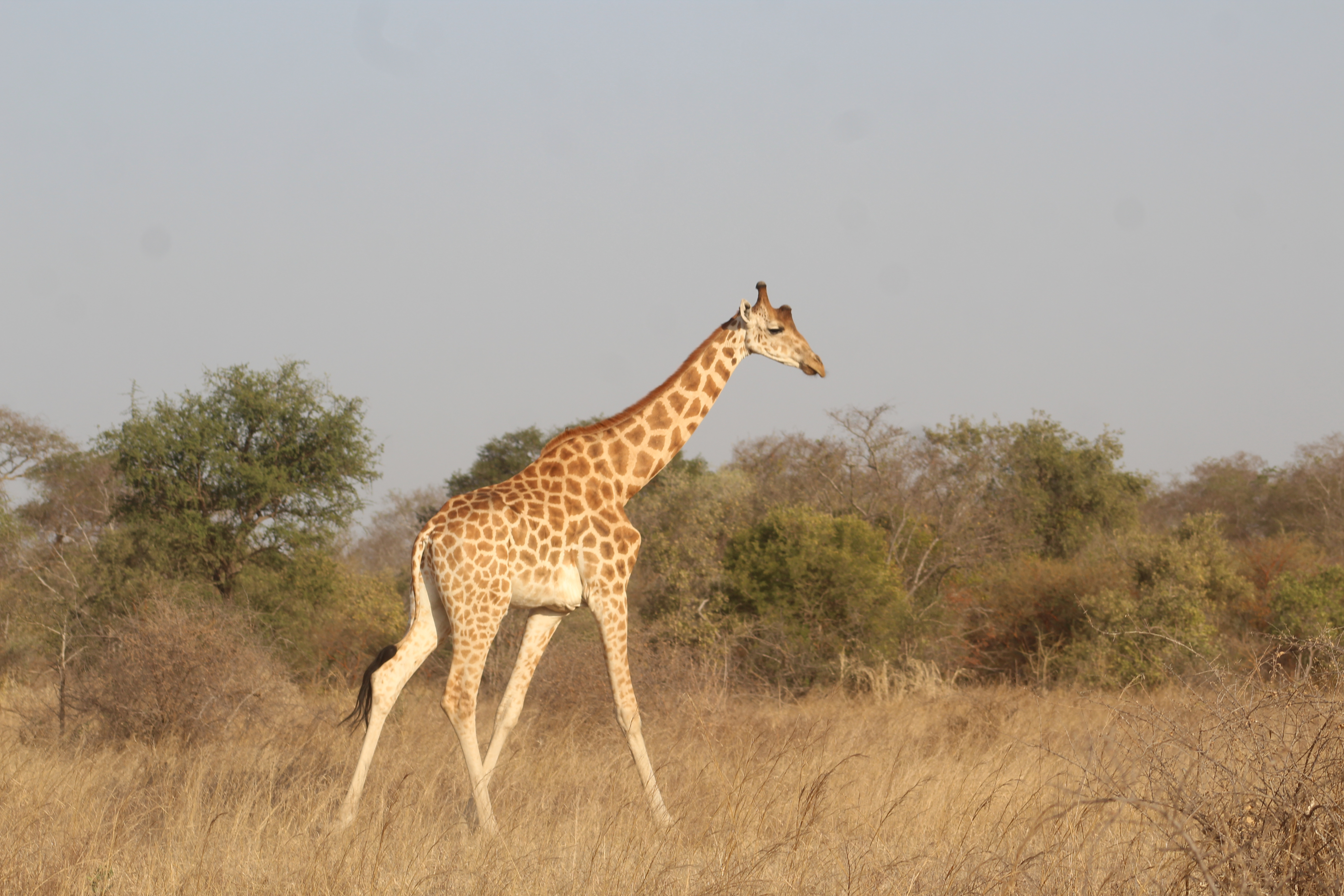
Giraffe at the Zakouma National Park

Elephants, lions, buffalo, hippopotamuses, rhinoceroses, giraffes, antelopes, leopards, cheetahs, hyenas, and many species of snakes are found here, although most large carnivore populations have been drastically reduced since the early 20th century. Elephant poaching, particularly in the south in areas such as Zakouma National Park, is a severe problem. The small group of surviving West African crocodiles in the Ennedi Plateau represents one of the last colonies known in the Sahara today.

Forest cover is around 3% of the total land area, equivalent to 4,313,000 hectares (ha) of forest in 2020, down from 6,730,000 hectares (ha) in 1990. In 2020, naturally regenerating forest covered 4,293,000 hectares (ha) and planted forest covered 19,800 hectares (ha). For the year 2015, 100% of the forest area was reported to be under public ownership. Chad had a 2018 Forest Landscape Integrity Index mean score of 6.18/10, ranking it 83rd globally out of 172 countries. Extensive deforestation has resulted in loss of trees such as acacias, baobab, dates and palm trees. This has also caused loss of natural habitat for wild animals; one of the main reasons for this is also hunting and livestock farming by increasing human settlements. Populations of animals like lions, leopards and rhino have fallen significantly.

Efforts have been made by the Food and Agriculture Organization to improve relations between farmers, agro-pastoralists and pastoralists in the Zakouma National Park, Siniaka-Minia National Park, and Aouk National Park to promote sustainable development. As part of the national conservation effort, more than 1.2 million trees have been replanted to check the advancement of the desert, which incidentally also helps the local economy by way of financial return from acacia trees, which produce gum arabic, and also from fruit trees.

Poaching is a serious problem in the country, particularly of elephants for the profitable ivory industry and a threat to lives of rangers even in the national parks such as Zakouma. Elephants are often massacred in herds in and around the parks by organised poaching. The problem is worsened by the fact that the parks are understaffed and that wardens have been murdered by poachers.

== Government and politics ==
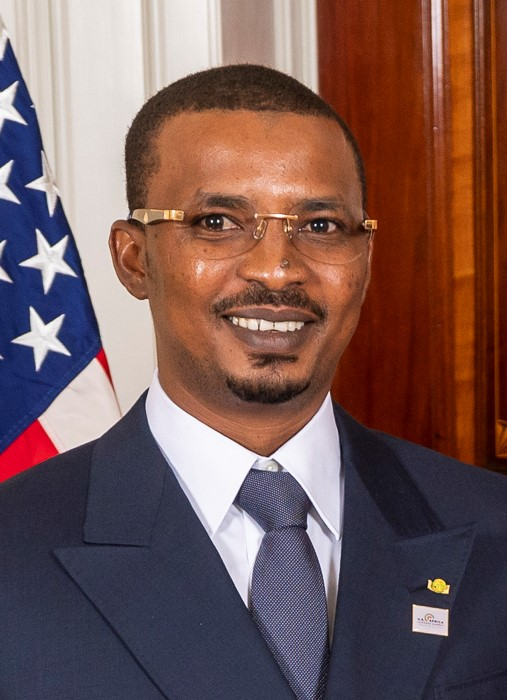
Mahamat Déby
President

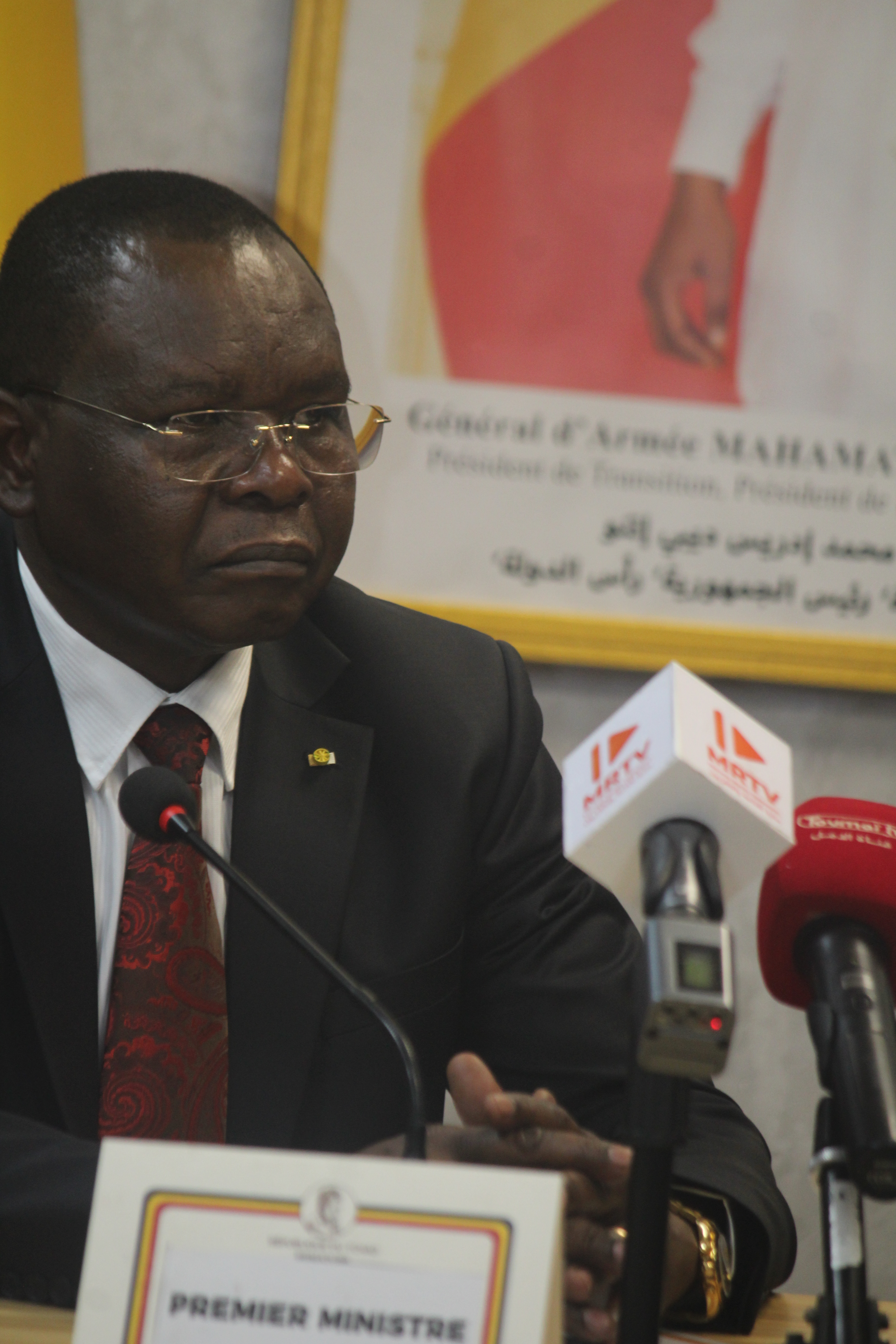
Allamaye Halina
Prime Minister

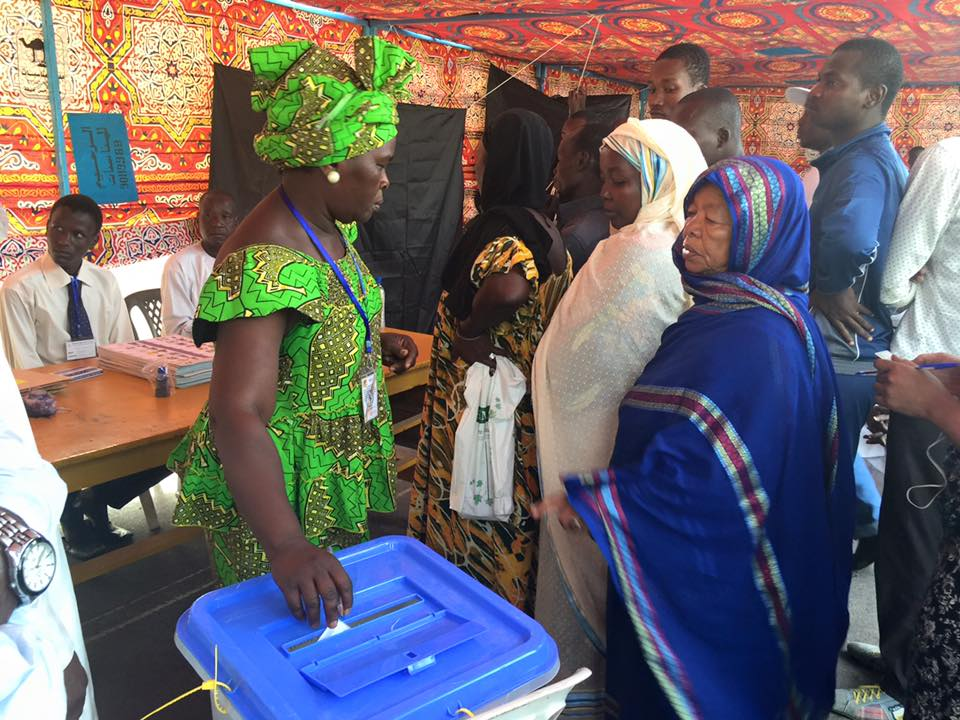
Chadian woman voting during the 2016 presidential election

Under the constitution adopted following the 2023 Chadian constitutional referendum, Chad is a presidential republic with a strong executive branch headed by the president, who dominates the political system. The incumbent president is Mahamat Déby. The president has the power to appoint the prime minister and the cabinet and exercises considerable influence over appointments of judges, generals, provincial officials, and heads of para-statal firms. In cases of grave and immediate threat, the president, in consultation with the National Assembly, may declare a state of emergency. The president is directly elected by popular vote; constitutional term limits were adjusted under the 2023 constitution to allow a limit of two consecutive five-year terms. Most of Déby's key advisers are members of the Zaghawa ethnic group, although southern and opposition personalities are represented in government.

The legal system is based on customary law and French civil law, applicable where the former does not interfere with public order or constitutional guarantees of equality. Despite the constitution's guarantee of judicial independence, the president names most key judicial officials. The legal system's highest jurisdictions are the Supreme Court and the Constitutional Council. The Supreme Court is made up of a chief justice, named by the president, and 15 councillors, appointed for life by the president and the National Assembly. The Constitutional Council is headed by nine judges elected to nine-year terms. It has the power to review legislation, treaties, and international agreements prior to their adoption.

The bicameral parliament makes legislation. The upper house, the Senate, has 69 members. 46 are indirectly elected by an electoral college, consisting of provincial and municipal councillors, and 23 are appointed by the President of the Republic. They serve six-year terms. The current President of the Senate is Haroun Kabadi. The lower house, the National Assembly, has 188 members. The current Speaker of the National Assembly is Ali Kolotou Tchaïmi. The president must sign or reject newly passed laws within 15 days. The National Assembly must approve the prime minister's plan of government and may force the prime minister to resign through a majority vote of no confidence. However, if the National Assembly rejects the executive branch's programme twice in one year, the president may disband the Assembly and call for new legislative elections. In practice, the president exercises considerable influence through his party, the Patriotic Salvation Movement (MPS), which holds a large majority in both chambers.

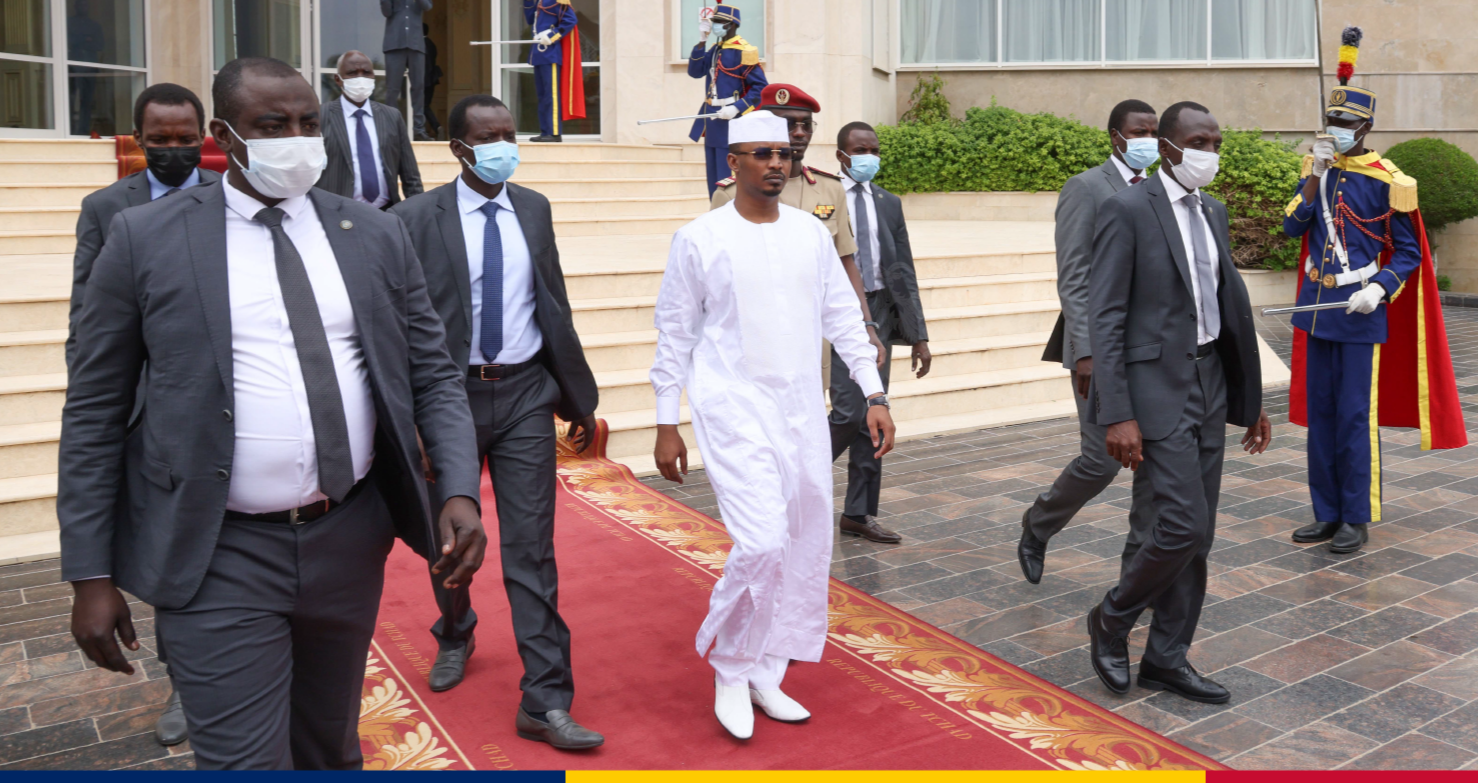
Chadian President Mahamat Déby is the son of Idriss Déby, who ruled Chad from 1990 to 2021.

Until the legalisation of opposition parties in 1992, Déby's MPS was the sole legal party in Chad. Since then, 78 registered political parties have become active. In 2005, opposition parties and human rights organisations supported the boycott of the constitutional referendum that allowed Idriss Déby to stand for re-election for a third term amid reports of widespread irregularities in voter registration and government censorship of independent media outlets during the campaign. Correspondents judged the 2006 presidential elections a mere formality, as the opposition deemed the polls a farce and boycotted them.

Chad is listed as a failed state by the Fund for Peace. Chad had the tenth-highest rank in the Fragile States Index in 2024. Corruption is rife at all levels; Transparency International's Corruption Perceptions Index for 2021 ranked Chad 164th among the 180 countries listed. Critics of Déby had accused him of cronyism and tribalism. In southern Chad, bitter conflicts over land are becoming more common. They frequently turn violent. Long-standing community culture is being eroded – and so are the livelihoods of many farmers.

President Idriss Déby's death on 20 April 2021 resulted in both the nation's National Assembly and government being dissolved and national leadership being replaced with a transitional military council consisting of military officers and led by his son Mahamat Déby. In October 2022, Déby extended the transitional period and was sworn in as transitional president after dissolving the Transitional Military Council. This caused the 2022 Chadian protests, which became one of the most violent in Chadian history and were suppressed by government forces. Following the adoption of a new constitution in December 2023, a presidential election was held in May 2024, in which Mahamat Déby was elected president, formally ending three years of transitional military rule. He subsequently appointed Allamaye Halina as prime minister in May 2024. According to the 2023 V-Dem Democracy indices, Chad was ranked the 16th lowest electoral democracy worldwide and 4th lowest in Africa.

=== Administrative divisions ===
Chad is divided into 23 provinces. Each province is headed by a presidentially appointed governor. Prefects administer the provinces' 120 departments, which are divided into 454 sub-prefectures.

The constitution provides for decentralised government to compel local populations to play an active role in their own development. To this end, the constitution declares that each administrative subdivision be governed by elected local assemblies.

No.	Province	Population (2009)	Population (1 July 2023)	Estimated area (km^{2})	Capital	Departments
1	Bahr el-Gazel	257,267	407,256	58,525	Moussoro	Barh el-Gazel Nord, Barh el-Gazel Sud, Barh el-Gazel Ouest, Barh el-Gazel Est, Kleta
2	Batha	488,458	748,395	93,732	Ati	Batha Est, Batha Ouest, Fitri, Ouadi-Rimé, Assinet, Haraze
3	Borkou	93,584	154,865	271,513	Faya	Borkou, Borkou-Yala, Kouba
4	Chari-Baguirmi	578,425	884,924	47,226	Massenya	Baguirmi, Chari, Loug-Chari, Dourbali
5	Ennedi-Est	107,302	175,321	81,696	Amdjarass	Amdjarass, Wadi Hawar, Itou, Nohi, Bao, Mourdi
6	Ennedi-Ouest	60,617	109,753	117,686	Fada	Fada, Mourtcha, Lac-Ounianga, Tebi, Gouro, Torbol
7	Guéra	538,359	824,161	62,678	Mongo	Guéra, Abtouyour, Barh-Signaka, Mangalmé, Garada
8	Hadjer-Lamis	566,858	870,231	31,376	Massakory	Dagana, Dababa Haraz-al-Biar, Ngoura
9	Kanem	333,387	505,839	70,516	Mao	Kanem-Centre, Kanem-Nord, Kanem-Sud, Kanem-Est, Kanem-Ouest
10	Lac	331,496	509,258	20,543	Bol	Mamdi, Wayi, Kaya, Fouli, Kouloukime
11	Logone Occidental	689,044	1,053,958	8,969	Moundou	Lac-Wey, Guéni, Ngourkosso, Dodjé
12	Logone Oriental	779,339	1,184,567	24,119	Doba	La Pendé, La Nya, La Nya-Pendé, Kouh-Est, Kouh-Ouest, Monts de Lam
13	Mandoul	628,065	1,002,346	17,761	Koumra	Barh-Sara, Mandoul Occidental, Mandoul Oriental, Goundi, Taralnass, Mandoul Central
14	Mayo-Kebbi Est	774,782	1,179,260	18,458	Bongor	Mayo-Boneye, Mayo-Lémié, Mont-Illi, Kabbia
15	Mayo-Kebbi Ouest	564,470	858,593	12,787	Pala	Mayo-Dallah, Mayo-Binder, Lac-Léré, El-Ouaya, Nanaye
16	Moyen-Chari	588,008	902,311	42,307	Sarh	Barh-Kôh, Grande Sido, Lac-Iro, Korbol, La Moula, Bragoto
17	Ouaddaï	721,166	1,102,467	30,790	Abéché	Ouara, Abougoudam, Djourf Al Ahmar, Assongha
18	Salamat	302,301	470,256	69,631	Am Timan	Barh-Azoum, Aboudeïa, Haraze-Mangueigne
19	Sila	387,461	591,300	36,745	Goz Beïda	Kimiti, Abdi, Tissi, Adé, Koukou-Angarana
20	Tandjilé	661,906	1,007,812	17,891	Laï	Tandjilé-Est, Tandjilé-Centre, Tandjilé-Ouest, Manga, Manbagué
21	Tibesti	25,483	52,626	135,896	Bardaï	Bardaï, Zouar, Wour, Aouzou, Emi-Koussi, Zoumri
22	Wadi Fira	508,383	792,394	56,362	Biltine	Biltine, Dar-Tama, Mégri, Iriba, Al-Biher, Dar-Alfawakih, Tiné
23	N'Djamena (capital)	951,418	1,434,592	408	N'Djamena	10 dawāʾir or arrondissements

=== Foreign relations and internal opposition ===
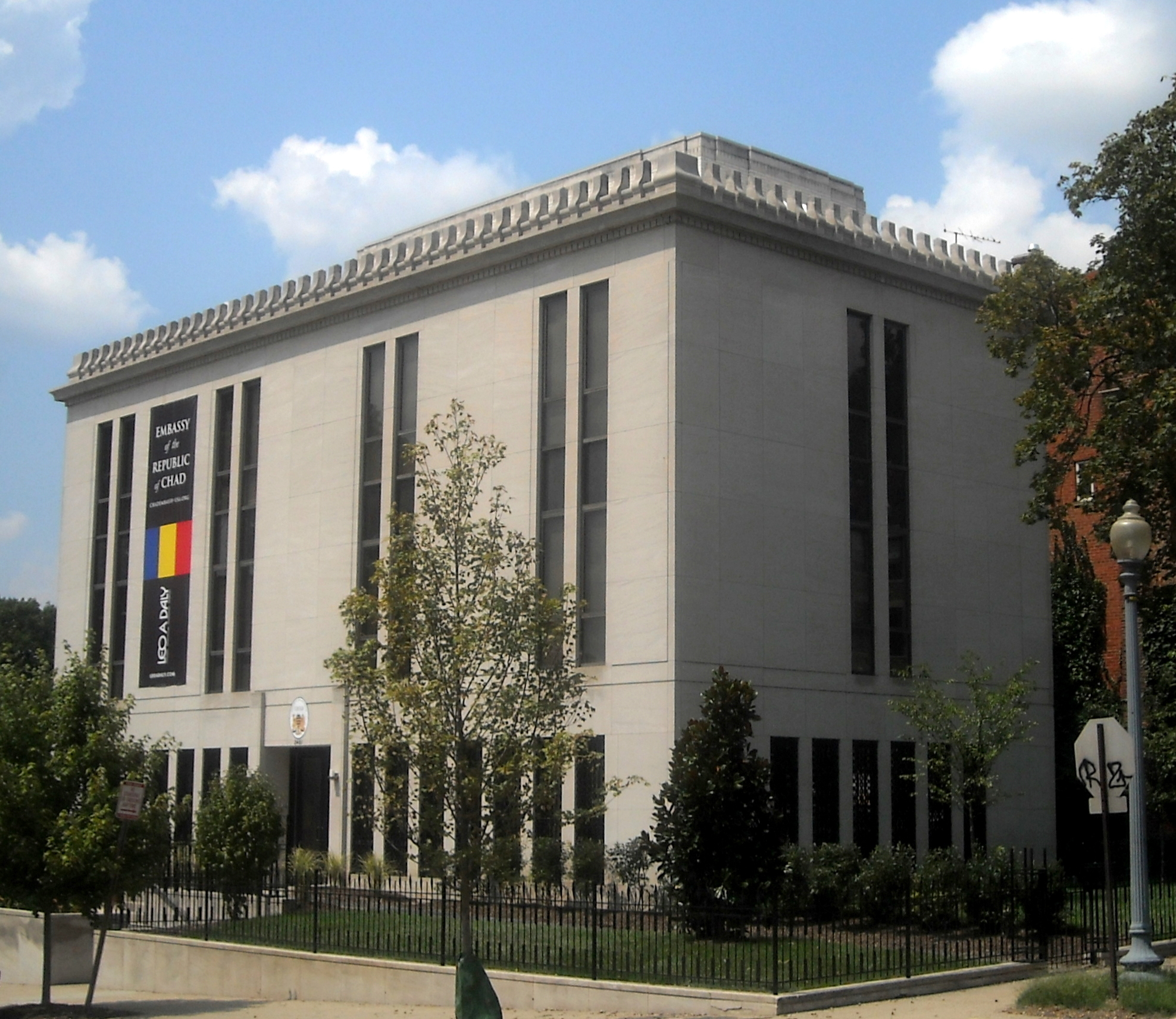
Embassy of Chad in Washington, D.C.

Chad's foreign relations historically featured strong ties with France, which maintained a troop presence in the country for decades. However, Franco-Chadian relations cooled, leading to the departure of the last French soldiers from Chad in early 2025, which ended France's direct military presence.

There have been numerous rebel groups throughout the last few decades. In 2007, a peace treaty was signed that integrated United Front for Democratic Change soldiers into the Chadian Army. The Movement for Justice and Democracy in Chad also clashed with government forces in 2003 in an attempt to overthrow President Idriss Déby. In addition, there have been various conflicts with Khartoum's Janjaweed rebels in eastern Chad, who killed civilians by use of helicopter gunships. Presently, the Union of Resistance Forces (UFR) are a rebel group that continues to battle with the government. In 2010, the UFR reportedly had a force estimating 6,000 men and 300 vehicles.

The UAE foreign aid was inaugurated in Amdjarass on 3 August 2023. The UAE's continuous efforts to provide assistance to the Chadian people and support endeavours to provide humanitarian and relief aid through the UAE's humanitarian institutions to Sudanese refugees in Chad.

=== Military ===
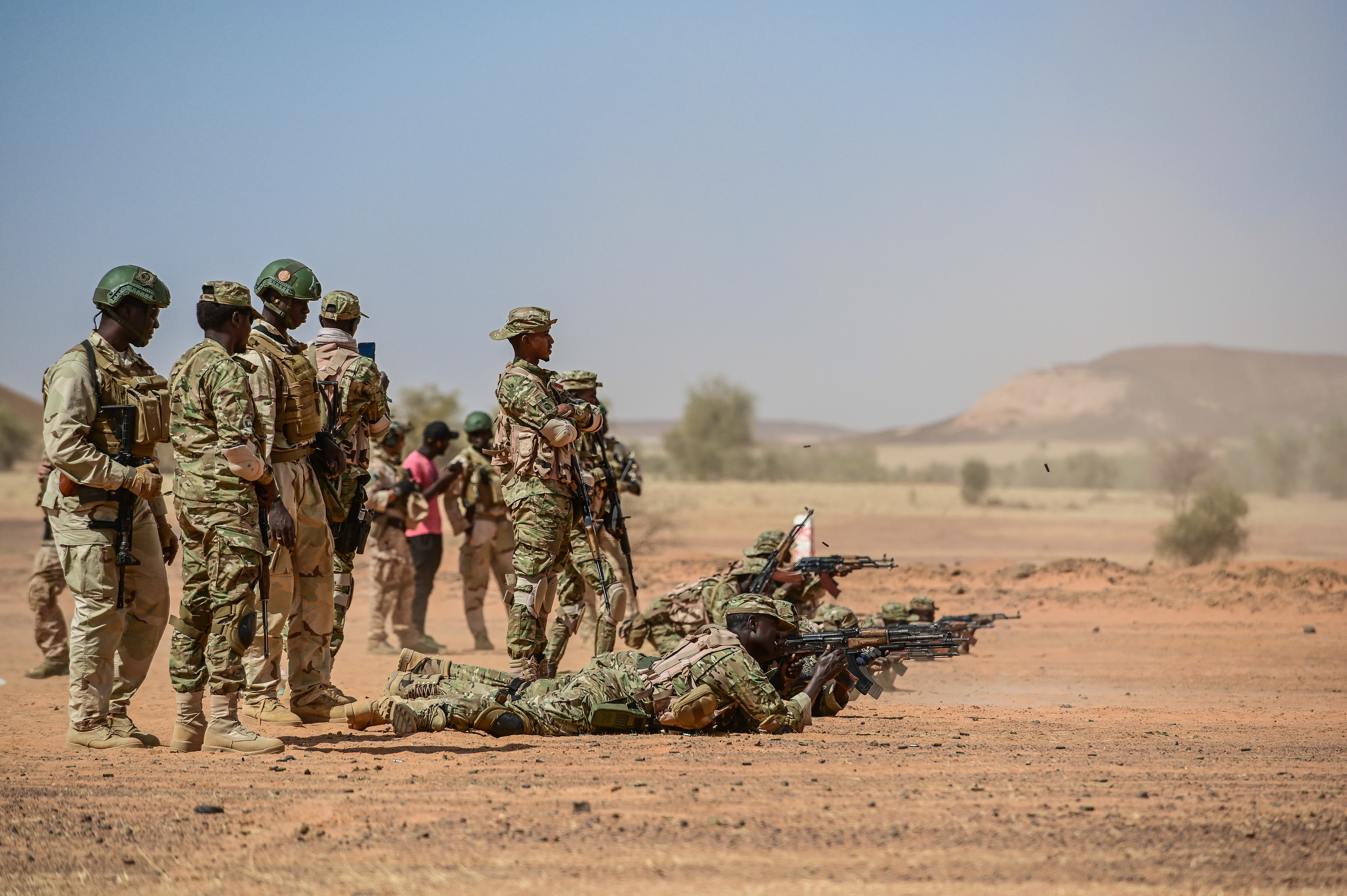
Chadian soldiers at the Flintlock 2020 exercise in Mauritania, organised by the U.S. Africa Command.

As of 2024 Chad was estimated to have 33,250 active military personnel, including 27,500 in the Ground Forces, 350 in the Air Force, and 5,400 in the General Directorate of the Security Services of State Institutions. There are 4,500 in the National Gendarmerie and 7,400 in the National and Nomadic Guard. The Ground Forces are organised into seven military regions and twelve battalions, including one armoured, seven infantry, one artillery, and three logistical.

Chad is a member of the G5 Sahel and the Multinational Joint Task Force, which were formed to fight against Islamic insurgent groups in the region, and had contributed nearly 1,500 troops to the MINUSMA mission in Mali.

The CIA World Factbook estimates the military budget to be 4.2% of GDP as of 2006. Given the then GDP ($7.095 bln) of the country, military spending was estimated to be about $300 million. This estimate however dropped after the end of the civil war (2005–2010) to 2.0% as estimated by the World Bank for 2011.

== Demographics ==
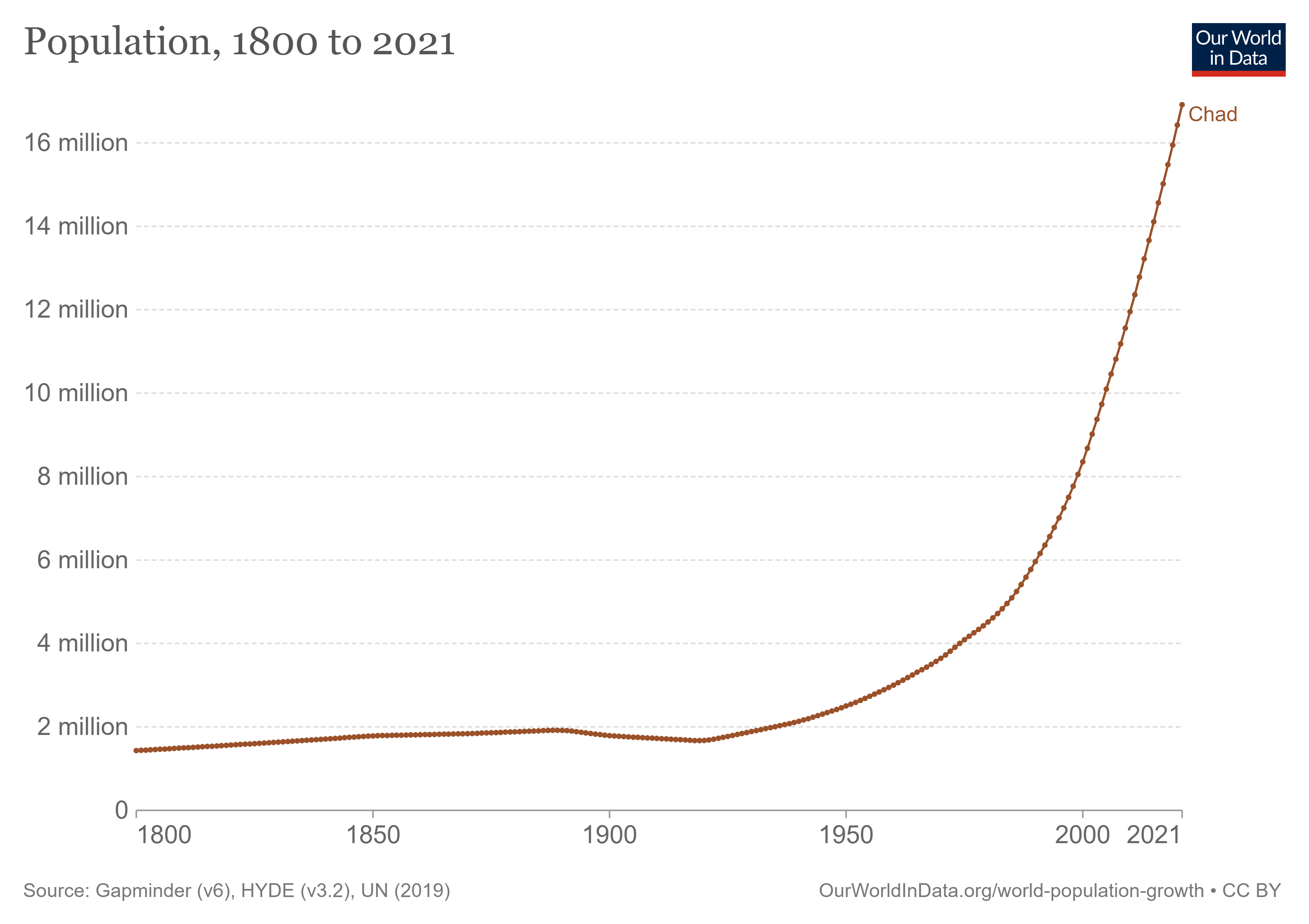
Demographics of Chad, Our World in Data, 2022; number of inhabitants in millions

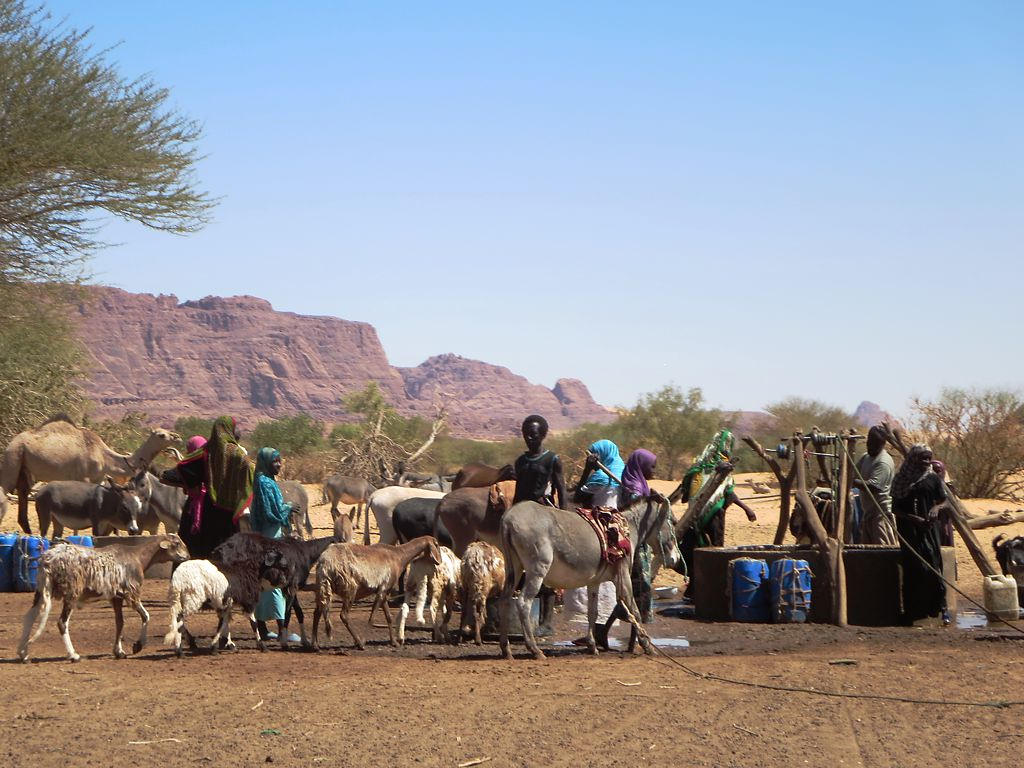
Toubou nomads in the Ennedi Mountains

Chad's national statistical agency projected the country's 2015 population between 13,630,252 and 13,679,203, with 13,670,084 as its medium projection; based on the medium projection, 3,212,470 people lived in urban areas and 10,457,614 people lived in rural areas. The population is young: an estimated 47% is under 15. The birth rate is estimated at 42.35 births per 1,000 people, and the mortality rate at 16.69. The life expectancy is 52 years. The agency assessed the population as of 2026 at 20,031,602.

The population is unevenly distributed. Density is 0.1/km^{2} (0.26/sq mi) in the Saharan Borkou-Ennedi-Tibesti Region but 52.4/km^{2} (136/sq mi) in the Logone Occidental Region. In the capital, it is even higher. About half of the population lives in the southern fifth of its territory.

Urban life is concentrated in the capital, whose population is mostly engaged in commerce. The other major towns are Sarh, Moundou, Abéché and Doba, which are considerably smaller but growing rapidly in population and economic activity. Since 2003, 230,000 Sudanese refugees fled to eastern Chad from war-ridden Darfur. With the 172,600 Chadians displaced by the civil war in the east, this generated tensions in the communities. As of 2025, Chad hosts approximately 1.5 million refugees, of whom more than 1.3 million are Sudanese and 145,000 are Central African. Chad has the highest refugee population per capita of any African nation, with the number of Sudanese refugees having doubled since 2023. Border towns in eastern Chad, such as Adré, have received a large influx of refugees from Sudan.

Polygamy is common, with 39% of women living in such unions. This is sanctioned by law, which automatically permits polygamy unless spouses specify that this is unacceptable upon marriage. Although violence against women is prohibited, domestic violence is common. Female genital mutilation is also prohibited, but the practice is widespread and deeply rooted in tradition; 45% of women undergo the procedure, with the highest rates among Arabs, Hadjarai, and Ouaddaians (90% or more). Lower percentages were reported among the Sara (38%) and the Toubou (2%). Women lack equal opportunities in education and training, making it difficult for them to compete for the relatively few formal-sector jobs. Although property and inheritance laws based on the French code do not discriminate against women, local leaders adjudicate most inheritance cases in favour of men, according to traditional practice.

=== Cities, towns, and municipalities ===
Cities of Chad
Rank	City	Population		Region
Rank	City	1993 census	2009 census	Region
1.	N'Djamena	530,965	951,418	N'Djamena
2.	Moundou	99,530	137,251	Logone Occidental
3.	Abéché	54,628	97,963	Ouaddaï
4.	Sarh	75,496	97,224	Moyen-Chari
5.	Kélo	31,319	57,859	Tandjilé
6.	Am Timan	21,269	52,270	Salamat
7.	Doba	17,920	49,647	Logone Oriental
8.	Pala	26,116	49,461	Mayo-Kebbi Ouest
9.	Bongor	20,448	44,578	Mayo-Kebbi Est
10.	Goz Beïda	3,083	41,248	Sila

In the 2024 Global Hunger Index, Chad ranks 125th out of the 127 countries with sufficient data to calculate 2024 GHI scores, having a score of 36.4.

=== Ethnic groups ===
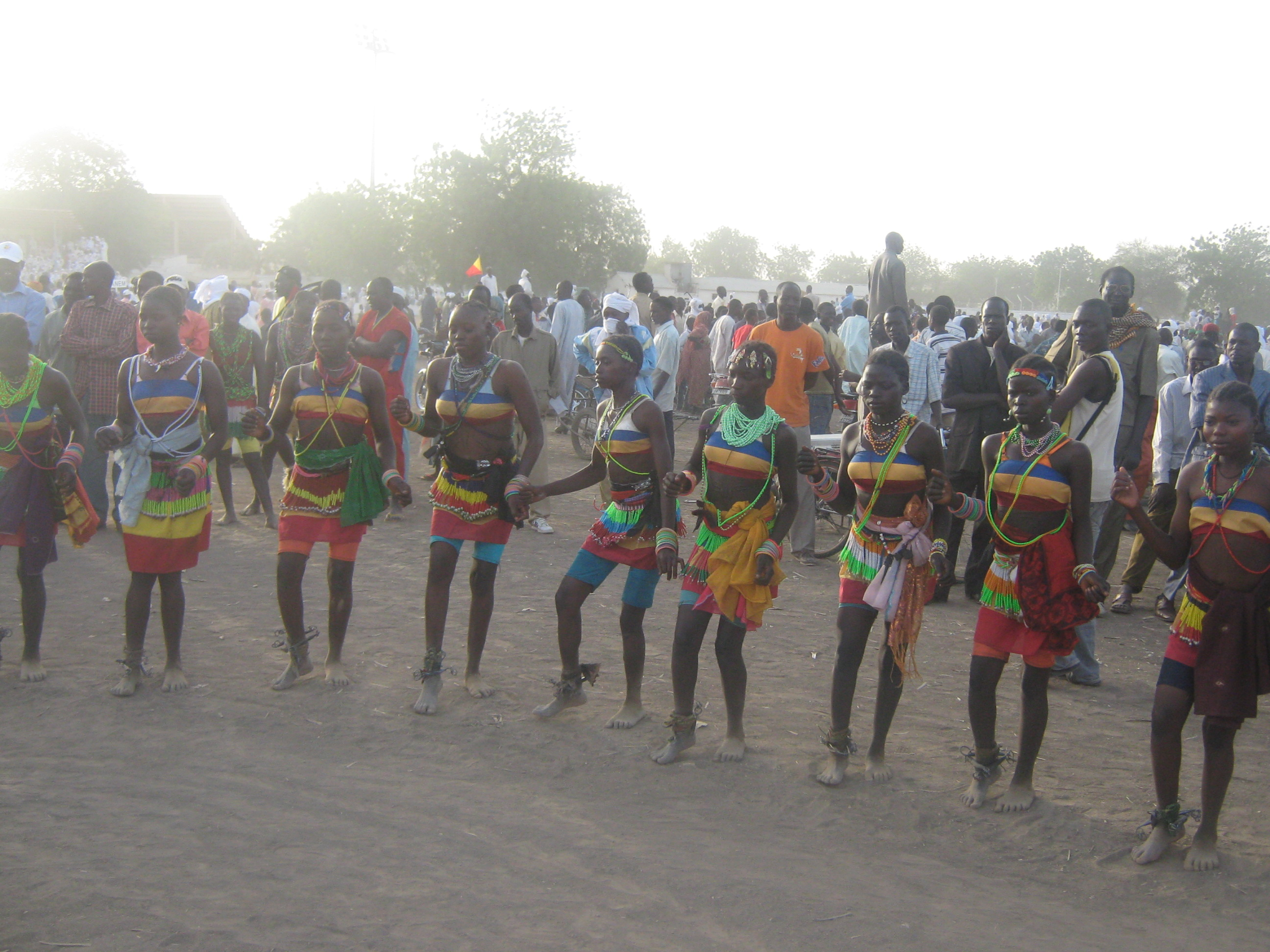
Mboum girls dancing in Chad

The peoples of Chad carry significant ancestry from Eastern, Central, Western, and Northern Africa. Chad has more than 200 distinct ethnic groups, which create diverse social structures. The colonial administration and independent governments have attempted to impose a national society, but for most Chadians the local or regional society remains the most important influence outside the immediate family. Nevertheless, people may be classified according to the geographical region in which they live.

In the south live sedentary people such as the Sara, the nation's main ethnic group, whose essential social unit is the lineage. In the Sahel, sedentary peoples live side by side with nomadic ones, such as the Arabs, the country's second major ethnic group. The north is inhabited by nomads, mostly Toubous.

=== Languages ===
The official languages are French and Arabic, with over 100 regional languages being spoken in the country. The Chadic branch of the Afroasiatic language family gets its name from Chad and is represented by dozens of languages native to the country. Chad is also home to Central Sudanic, Maban, and several Niger-Congo languages. Nevertheless, French remains the lingua franca and language of the government and education.

=== Religion ===
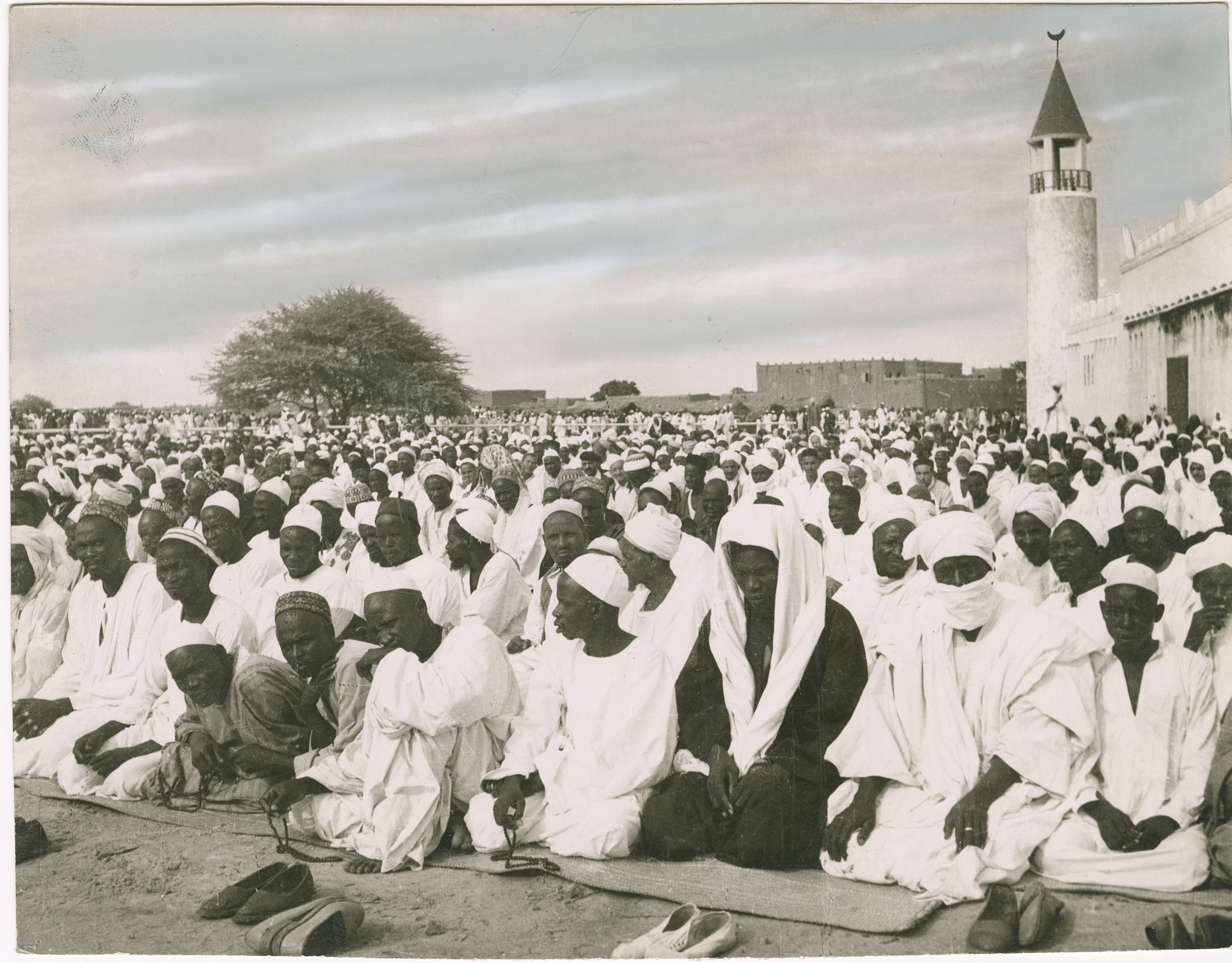
Prayer in front of the Fort Lamy mosque, now N'Djamena, 1955

Various estimates, including from Pew Research in 2010, find that 52–58% of the population was Muslim, while 39–44% were Christian (22% Catholic and 17% Protestant). According to a 2012 Pew Research survey, 48% of Muslims professed to be Sunni, 21% Shia, 4% Ahmadi and 23% non-denominational Muslim. Around 55% of Sunnis belong to Sufi orders, with 35% adhering to Tijaniyah which incorporates some local religious elements. In 2020, the Association of Religion Data Archives estimated the vast majority of Muslims were Tijaniyah Sunnis. A small minority of Muslims (5–10%) hold more fundamentalist practices, which in some cases may be associated with Saudi-oriented Wahhabism.

Religions in Chad:
1. Islam 55.1 (53.7%)
2. Christianity 41.1 (40.0%)
3. No religion 2.4 (2.34%)
4. Animism 4 (3.89%)
5. Others 0.1 (0.10%)

Catholics represent the largest Christian denomination. Most Protestants, including the Nigeria-based "Winners' Chapel", are affiliated with various evangelical Christian groups. Members of the Baháʼí and Jehovah's Witnesses religious communities also are present; both faiths were introduced after independence in 1960 and therefore are considered to be "new" religions in the country.

A small proportion of the population continues to practice indigenous religions. Animism includes a variety of ancestor and place-oriented religions whose expression is highly specific. Christianity arrived in Chad with French and American missionaries; as with Islam, it syncretises aspects of pre-Christian religious beliefs.

Religion in Chad (Pew Research)
religion	percent
Islam	57%
Christianity	39%
None	2%
Folk	1%
Other	1%

Muslims are largely concentrated in northern and eastern Chad, and animists and Christians live primarily in southern Chad and Guéra. Many Muslims also reside in southern Chad, but the Christian presence in the north is minimal. The constitution provides for a secular state and guarantees religious freedom; different religious communities generally co-exist without problems.

Chad is home to foreign missionaries representing both Christian and Islamic groups. Itinerant Muslim preachers visit, primarily from Sudan, Saudi Arabia, and Pakistan. Saudi Arabian funding generally supports social and educational projects and extensive mosque construction.

=== Education ===
Educators face considerable challenges because of the dispersed population and a certain degree of reluctance on the part of parents to send their children to school. Although attendance is compulsory, only 68 percent of boys attend primary school, and at 33 percent, Chad has one of the lowest literacy rates of Sub-Saharan Africa. Higher education is provided at the University of N'Djamena.

In 2013, the U.S. Department of Labor's Findings on the Worst Forms of Child Labor reported that school attendance of children aged 5 to 14 was as low as 39%. This can also be related to the issue of child labour as the report also stated that 53% of children aged 5 to 14 were working, and that 30% of children aged 7 to 14 combined work and school. The List of Goods Produced by Child Labor or Forced Labor cites cattle herding as a major agricultural activity that employed underage children.

== Economy ==
GDP per capita development of Chad since 1950

Chad is part of the Bank of Central African States, the Customs and Economic Union of Central Africa and the Organization for the Harmonization of Business Law in Africa (OHADA).

Currency is the CFA franc. In the 1960s, the mining industry of Chad produced sodium carbonate, or natron. There have also been reports of gold-bearing quartz in the Biltine Prefecture. However, years of civil war have scared away foreign investors; those who left Chad between 1979 and 1982 have only recently begun to regain confidence in the country's future. In 2000, major direct foreign investment in the oil sector began, boosting economic prospects.

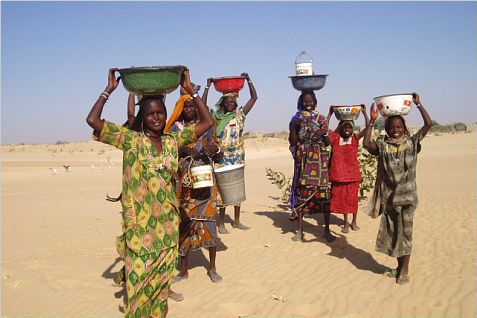
Women in Mao, where water is provided by a water tower. Access to clean water is often a problem in Chad.

Uneven inclusion in the global political economy as a site for colonial resource extraction (primarily cotton and crude oil), a global economic system that does not promote nor encourage the development of Chadian industrialisation, and the failure to support local agricultural production has meant that the majority of Chadians live in daily uncertainty and hunger. Over 80% of the population relies on subsistence farming and livestock raising for its livelihood. The crops grown and the locations of herds are determined by the local climate. In the southernmost 10% of the territory lies the most fertile cropland, with rich yields of sorghum and millet. In the Sahel only the hardier varieties of millet grow and with much lower yields than in the south. The Sahel is ideal pastureland for large herds of commercial cattle and for goats, sheep, donkeys and horses. The Sahara's scattered oases support only some dates and legumes. Cities face serious difficulties of municipal infrastructure; only 48% of urban residents have access to potable water and only 2% to basic sanitation.

Before the development of the oil industry, cotton dominated industry and the labour market accounted for approximately 80% of export earnings. Cotton remains a primary export. Rehabilitation of Cotontchad, a major cotton company weakened by a decline in world cotton prices, has been financed by France, the Netherlands, the European Union, and the International Bank for Reconstruction and Development. The parastatal is now expected to be privatised. Other than cotton, cattle, sesame, and gum arabic are dominant.

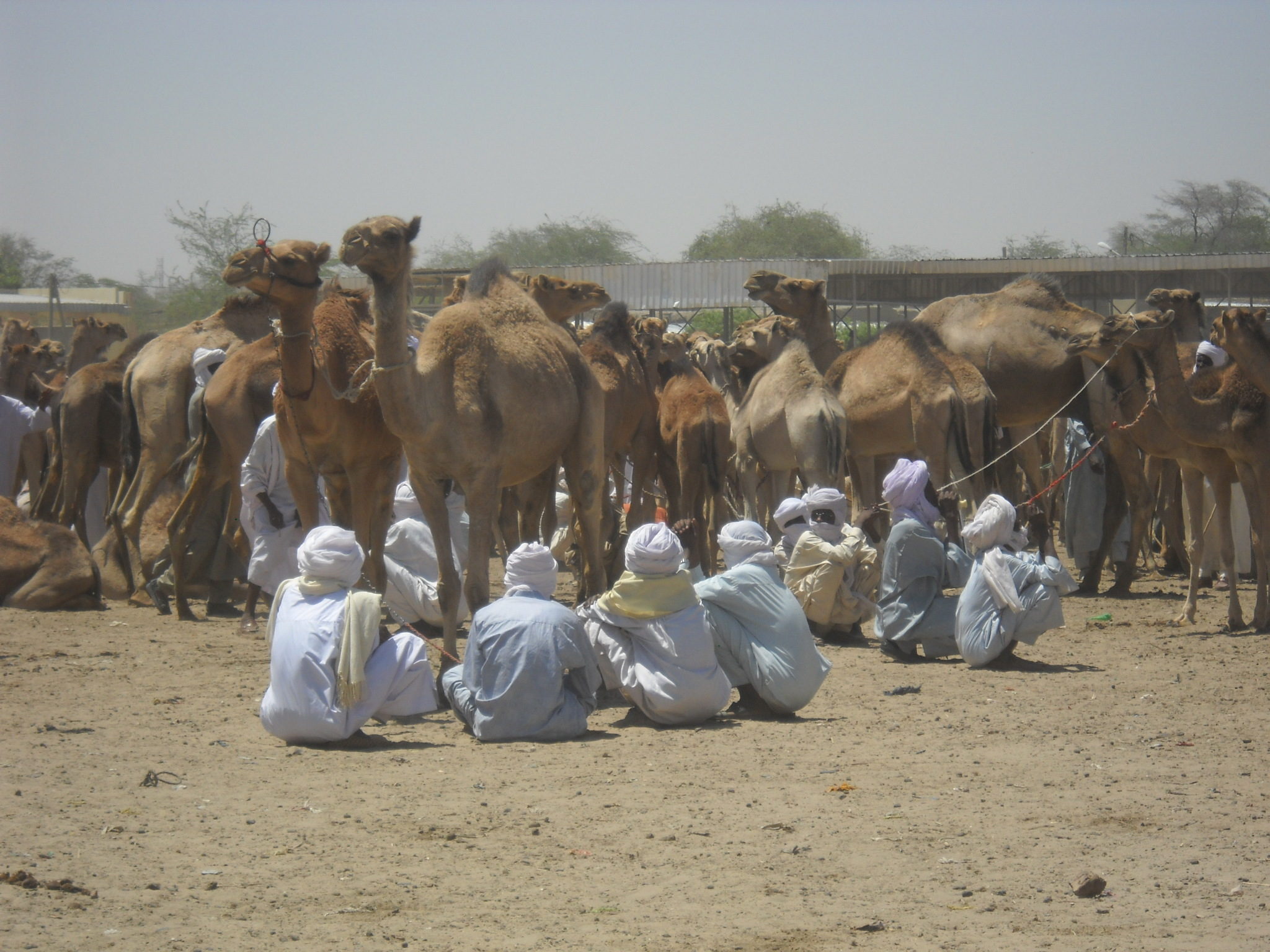
Weekly camel market in Moussoro

According to the United Nations, Chad has been affected by a humanitarian crisis since at least 2001. In February 2008 in the aftermath of the Battle of N'Djamena, UN Under-Secretary-General for Humanitarian Affairs John Holmes expressed "extreme concern" that the crisis would have a negative effect on the ability of humanitarians to deliver life-saving assistance to half a million beneficiaries, most of whom – according to him – heavily rely on humanitarian aid for their survival. UN spokesperson Maurizio Giuliano stated to The Washington Post: "If we do not manage to provide aid at sufficient levels, the humanitarian crisis might become a humanitarian catastrophe". Organisations such as Save the Children suspended activities due to killings of aid workers.

Chad has made some progress in reducing poverty, as there was a decline in the national poverty rate from 55% to 47% between 2003 and 2011. However, the number of poor people increased from 4.7 million (2011) to 6.5 million (2019) in absolute numbers. By 2018, 4.2 out of 10 people live below the poverty line.

Chad was listed in the Global Innovation Index for the first time in 2026, and ranked 139.

=== Infrastructure ===
==== Transport ====
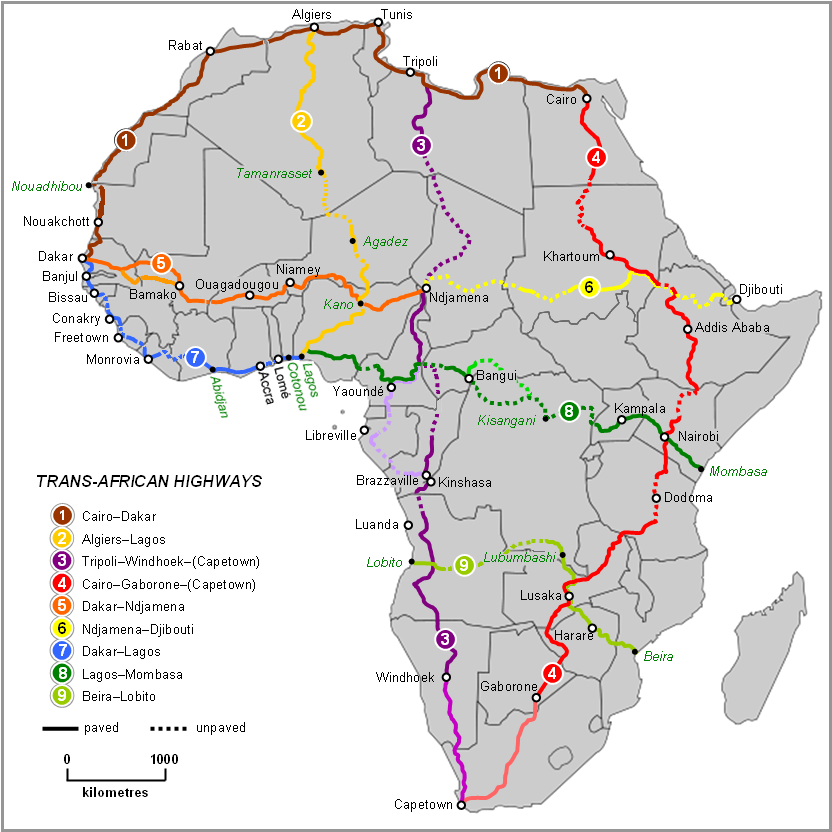
Map of Trans-African Highways

Civil war crippled the development of transport infrastructure; in 1987, Chad had only 30 kilometres (19 mi) of paved roads. Successive road rehabilitation projects improved the network to 550 kilometres (340 mi) by 2004. Nevertheless, the road network is limited; roads are often unusable for several months of the year. With no railways of its own, Chad depends heavily on Cameroon's rail system for the transport of exports and imports to and from the seaport of Douala.

Three trans-African automobile routes pass through Chad: the Tripoli-Cape Town Highway; the Dakar-Ndjamena Highway; and the Ndjamena-Djibouti Highway. As of 2013 Chad had an estimated 59 airports, 9 of which had paved runways. The N'Djamena International Airport serves the capital and provides regular direct flights to Paris and several African cities.

==== Energy ====
Chad's energy sector has had years of mismanagement by the parastatal Chad Water and Electric Society which provides power for 15% of the capital's citizens and covers only 1.5% of the national population. Most Chadians burn biomass fuels such as wood and manure for power.

ExxonMobil leads a consortium of Chevron and Petronas that has invested $3.7 billion to develop oil reserves estimated at one billion barrels in southern Chad. Oil production began in 2003 with the completion of a pipeline (financed in part by the World Bank) that links the southern oilfields to terminals on the Atlantic coast of Cameroon. As a condition of its assistance, the World Bank insisted that 80% of oil revenues be spent on development projects. In January 2006 the World Bank suspended its loan programme when the Chadian government passed laws reducing this amount. In July 2006, the World Bank and Chad signed a memorandum of understanding under which the government commits 70% of its spending to priority poverty reduction programmes.

==== Telecommunications ====
The telecommunication system is basic and expensive, with fixed telephone services provided by the state telephone company SotelTchad. In 2000, there were 14 fixed telephone lines per 10,000 inhabitants in the country, one of the lowest telephone densities in the world. Gateway Communications, a pan-African wholesale connectivity and telecommunications provider, has a presence in Chad. In 2013, the Ministry for Posts and Information & Communication Technologies announced that the country would be seeking a partner for fibre optic technology. Chad is investing over €175 million to roll out a major 1,200-kilometre national fibre-optic backbone.

== Culture ==
Because of its great social diversity, Chad possesses a rich cultural heritage. The government has actively promoted culture and traditions by opening the Chad National Museum and the Chad Cultural Centre. Six national holidays are observed throughout the year, and additional holidays include the Christian holiday of Easter Monday and the Muslim holidays of Eid al-Fitr, Eid al-Adha and Mawlid.

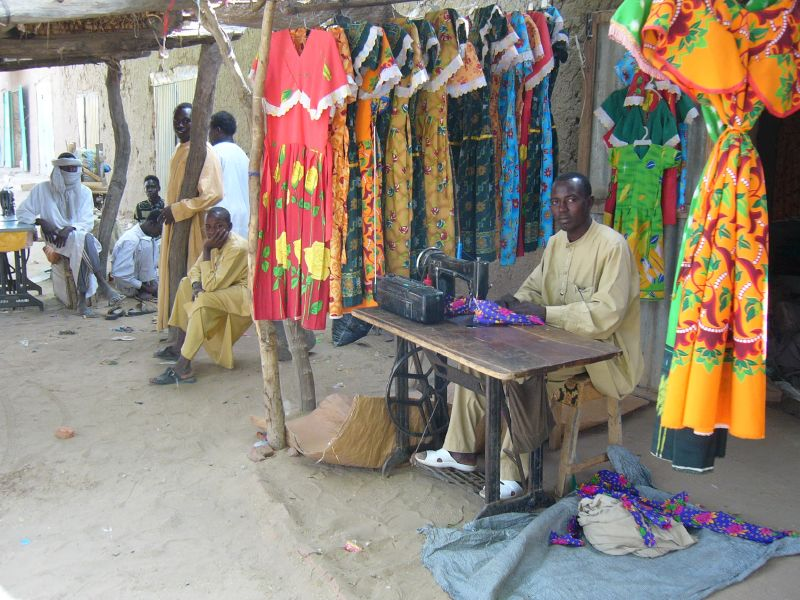
A Chadian tailor selling traditional dresses.

=== Literature ===
As in other Sahelian countries, literature in Chad has seen an economic, political and spiritual drought that has affected its best known writers. Many Chadian authors have been forced to write in exile, which generates literature dominated by themes of political oppression and historical discourse. Since 1962, 20 Chadian authors have written some 60 works of fiction. Among the most internationally renowned writers are Joseph Brahim Seïd, Baba Moustapha, Antoine Bangui and Koulsy Lamko. In 2003 Chad's sole literary critic, Ahmat Taboye, published his Anthologie de la littérature tchadienne to further knowledge of Chad's literature.

=== Music ===
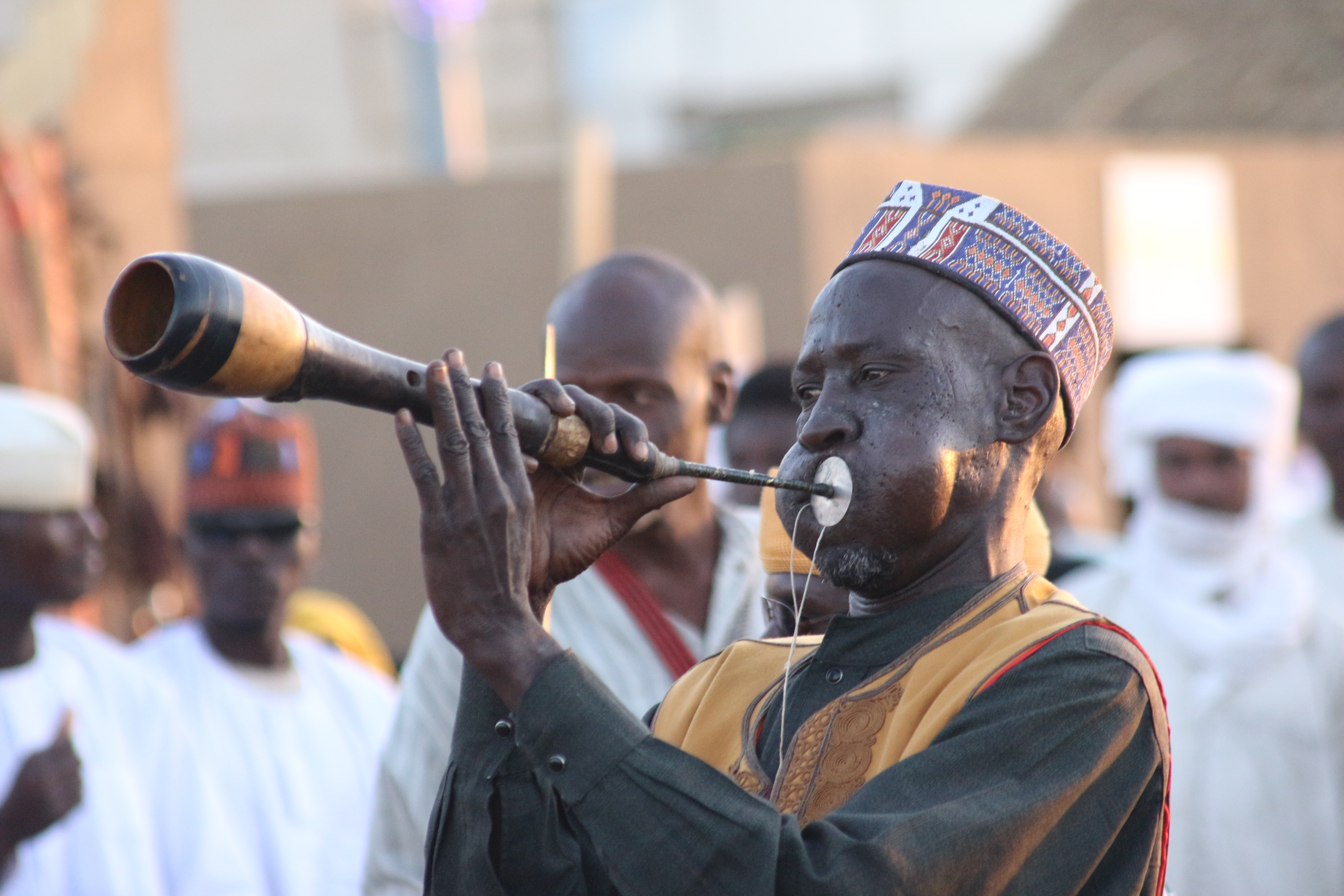
Wind instrument player in Chad

Chadian music employs instruments such as the kinde, a type of bow harp; the kakaki, a long tin horn; and the hu hu, a stringed instrument that uses calabashes as resonators. Other instruments and their combinations are more linked to specific ethnic groups: the Sara prefer whistles, balafons, harps and kodjo drums; and the Kanembu combine the sounds of drums with those of flute-like instruments.

The music group Chari Jazz formed in 1964 and initiated Chad's modern music scene. Later, more renowned groups such as African Melody and International Challal attempted to mix modernity and tradition. Popular groups such as Tibesti have clung faster to their heritage by drawing on sai, a traditional style of music from southern Chad. The people of Chad have customarily disdained modern music. Piracy and a lack of legal protections for artists' rights remain problems to further development of the music industry.

=== Media and cinema ===
Like many North African nations, the media industry has been stifled by chronic instability and government interference. Chad's television audience is limited to N'Djamena. The only television station is the state-owned Télé Tchad. Radio has a far greater reach, with 13 private radio stations. Newspapers are limited in quantity and distribution, and circulation figures are small because of transportation costs, low literacy rates, and poverty. While the constitution defends liberty of expression, the government has regularly restricted this right. In 2006 the government began to enact a system of censorship on the media.

The development of a Chadian film industry, which began with the short films of Edouard Sailly in the 1960s, was hampered by the civil wars and the lack of cinemas. Currently there is only one cinema in the country, reflecting the struggling media industry. The feature film industry began growing again in the 1990s, with the work of directors Mahamat-Saleh Haroun, Issa Serge Coelo and Abakar Chene Massar. Haroun's film Abouna was critically acclaimed, and his Daratt won the Grand Special Jury Prize at the 63rd Venice International Film Festival. The 2010 feature film A Screaming Man won the Jury Prize at the 2010 Cannes Film Festival, making Haroun the first Chadian director to enter, as well as win, an award in the main Cannes competition. Issa Serge Coelo directed the films Daresalam and DP75: Tartina City.

=== Cuisine ===
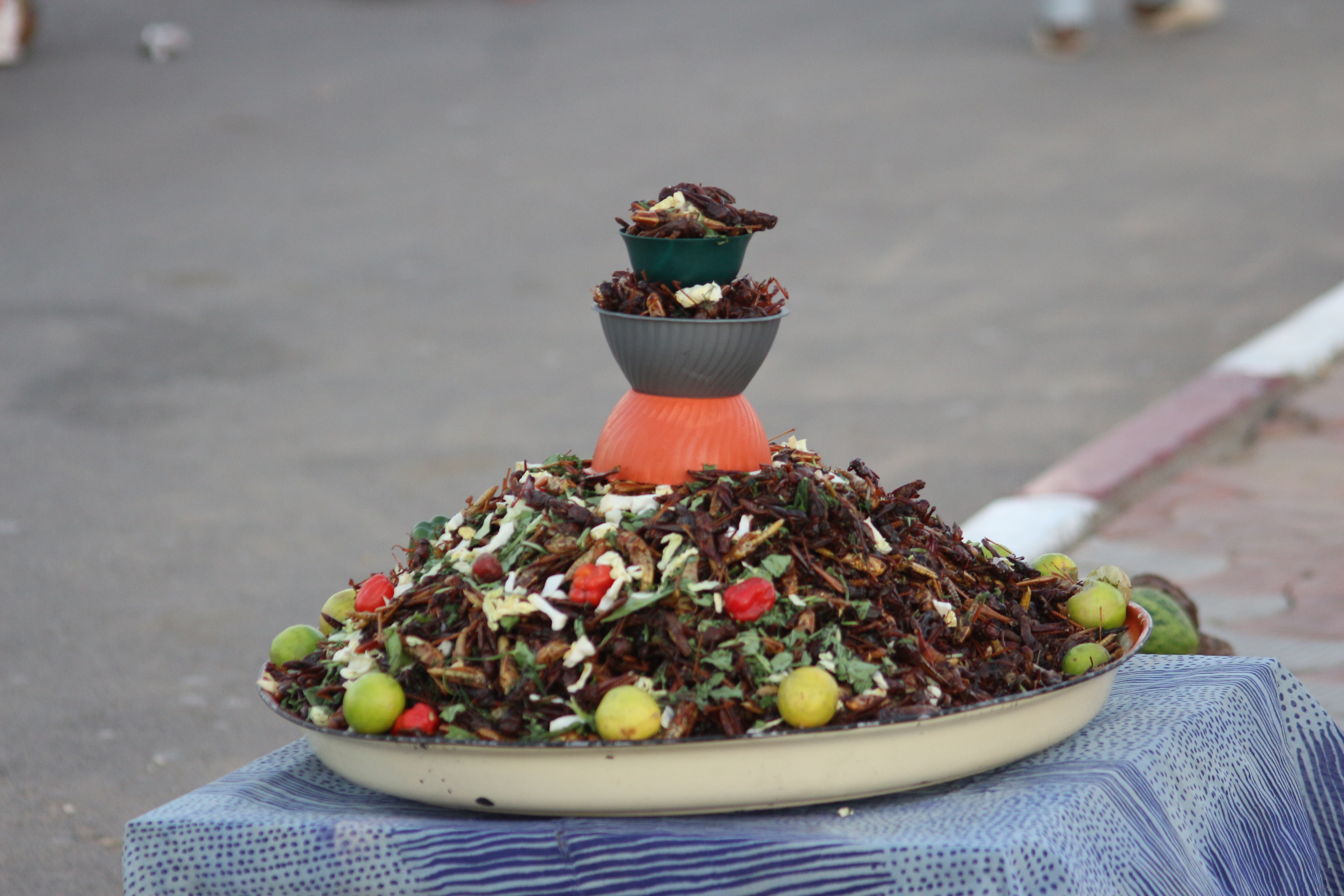
Fried or grilled grasshoppers

Millet is the staple food of Chadian cuisine. It is used to make balls of paste that are dipped in sauces. It is known as alysh in the north and as biya in the south. Fish is popular, which is generally prepared and sold either as salanga (sun-dried and lightly smoked Alestes and Hydrocynus) or as banda (smoked large fish). Carcaje is a popular sweet red tea extracted from hibiscus leaves. Alcoholic beverages, though absent in the north, are popular in the south. Southern Chadians drink millet beer, such as billi-billi made from red millet and coshate made from white millet.

=== Sports ===
Football is Chad's most popular sport. The national team is closely followed during international competitions, and Chadian footballers have played for European teams. In recent years many footballers such as Franck Tchaouna, Bertrand Mani and Ahmad Ngouyamsa have played in recognized UEFA leagues. Basketball and freestyle wrestling are widely practiced, the latter in a form in which the wrestlers put on traditional animal hides and cover themselves with dust.

== See also ==
- Outline of Chad
