= Chad Cultural Centre =

Institution in Mao, Chad

The Chad Cultural Centre is an institution located in Mao, Chad. It was founded by the government in order to foster national traditions.
