= Utilities in Chad =

In the late 1980s, public utilities in Chad were extremely limited. The Chadian Water and Electricity Company (Société Tchadienne d'Eau et d'Electricité—STEE), was the major public utility company. The government held 82 percent of the shares and CCCE held 18 percent. STEE provided water and electricity to the four main urban areas, N'Djamena, Moundou, Sarh, and Abéché. The company supplied water, but not electricity, to six other towns. Despite old equipment and high maintenance costs, STEE was able to meet about half of peak demand, which increased significantly from 1983 to 1986. Production of electricity rose by 35 percent from 1983 to 1986, and the supply of water increased by 24 percent during the same period. In 1986 STEE produced 62.1 million kilowatt-hours of electricity and supplied 10.8 million cubic meters of water.

In N'Djamena the majority of households had access to water. There were, however, only about 3,000 officially connected customers, a good proportion of which were collective customers. There were also an estimated 1,500 illegal water connections. The rest of the people received water from standpipes. Some 5,000 customers were officially connected for electricity in the capital in 1986, with an unknown number of illegal connections. Because electricity was so expensive and because electrical appliances were beyond the means of most people, the consumption of power per household was low. The high cost of electricity also hindered the expansion of small- and medium-sized enterprises.

A UN report detailing aid cuts to Chad further shows the scope of the problem as over a million Sudanese refugees are without aid like food and water because of a $400M shortfall in aid. The shortage of water stems from the lack of access to wells or water within the region and requires almost all of the water needed to come from aid or donations.

== See also ==
- Economy of Chad
- Telecommunications in Chad
