= Baba Moustapha =

- Born: 1952 (age 73–74); Chad
- Occupation: Playwright

Mahamat "Baba" Moustapha (Arabic: بابا مصطفى; 1952–1982) was a Chadian playwright writing in French. His plays include Le Maitre des Djinns ("La Mastro de la Ĝinoj"), Le Souffle de l'Harmattan ("La Spiro de Harmattano") and Makarie aux Épines. His posthumously published play Commandant Chaka (1983), a denunciation of military dictatorships, is considered to be his finest work. He is the namesake of the Association Artistique et Culturelle - Théâtre Vivant Baba Moustapha (ACT-TVBM), a theater company.
