= Ahmat Taboye =

Chadian literary critic

Ahmat Taboye is a literary critic from Chad. As head of the Department of Letters at the University of N'Djamena, he published Anthologie de la littérature tchadienne in 2003, which covers 40 years of Chadian literature. In May 2007, the Ministry of Cultural and Artistic Development named him a director.
