= Sudanese refugees in Chad =

- (Sudan) (Chad)

Total population
- 1,330,950 (UNHCR 2025)

Regions with significant populations
- Eastern Chad (Ouaddaï Region and Wadi Fira), N'Djamena, Sarh, Abeche, Adré

Languages
- Chadian Arabic, Masalit, Fur, Zaghawa and other Languages of Sudan, French

Religion
- Mostly Islam

Related ethnic groups
- Sudanese people

By 2025, the United Nations High Commissioner for Refugees (UNHCR) estimated that there are 1,330,950 Sudanese refugees in Chad. The majority of them left Sudan escaping from the violence of the ongoing Darfur crisis, which began in 2003. UNHCR has given the Sudanese refugees shelter in 12 different camps situated along the Chad–Sudan border. The most pressing issues UNHCR has to deal with in the refugee camps in Chad are related to insecurity in the camps (where children are being forcibly recruited by Chadian and Sudanese armed groups), malnutrition, access to water, HIV and AIDS, and education.

== Displacement between Chad and Sudan ==
Sudan and Chad are both guests and hosts to thousands of refugees from the other country. There are 304,650 Sudanese refugees in Chad as of April 2016 and 8,000 Chadian refugees in Sudan, the majority of whom sought refuge escaping from violence and conflicts.

Droughts, famines and political and armed conflicts have pushed Chadians and Sudanese alike in and out of their territories. For instance, Chadians have sought refuge in Sudan during the 1913–14 famine and the 1973 drought, and between 1979 and 1982 Sudan hosted 16,000 supporters of the Chadian leader Hissene Habre.

Sudan and Chad have also shared seasonal migratory patterns, in particular the area inhabited by the Masalit people, an ethnic group that shares a common language and that was separated when the contemporary borders of the states of Sudan and Chad were drawn. This seasonal migration entails the displacement of people between southeastern Chad and Darfur (Sudan), with the dry season when people are more mobile, roads are open, and regional markets are integrated. Chadians move into southeastern Sudan in search of food, water, and income until the rainy season, when they return to their villages and sow their crops.

== Sudan's conflicts ==
Since the time Sudan became independent in 1956 from the British and Egyptian condominium, it has experienced 21 years of civil wars between the North and the South. The war ended with signature of the Comprehensive Peace Agreement (CPA) in 2005, which stipulated the autonomy of South Sudan for six years followed by a referendum of self-determination that took place in January 2011. Southern Sudanese voters overwhelmingly opted for the independence of South Sudan, which will become a separate and independent state on 9 July 2011.

In 2003, the conflicts over land and water that had been ongoing in Darfur for decades took the shape of a civil war when the Sudan Liberation Army (SLA) and the Justice and Equality Movement (JEM) announced their existence and started fighting against the Janjaweed, a tribal militia backed by the Sudanese central government that had been attacking and razing villages in Darfur for a number of years. Since 2003, at least 300,000 people have been killed, and 1.8 million people have been displaced in Darfur. In the first four months of 2011, more than 70,000 people have fled their homes and taken refuge in camps established for displaced persons in Darfur. The Obama administration is pushing towards solving the conflict in Darfur before the independence of South Sudan, although reaching a peace agreement remains unlikely.

Overall, the International Organization for Migration (IOM) estimated at the end of 2010 that between 1.2 and 1.7 million Sudanese live abroad, and that neighboring countries were hosting more than half of them. Since the signature of the Comprehensive Peace Agreement in 2005, the Sudanese government, in cooperation with UNHCR, has signed tripartite agreements with Kenya, the Democratic Republic of Congo, the Central African Republic, Ethiopia and Uganda in order to organize the return of Sudanese refugees. The year 2007 registered a peak of returnees, 126,000, which has been decreasing during the following years: 70,000 in 2008 and 30,000 in 2009, the majority of which returned from Uganda. These return programs have efficiently reduced the number of Sudanese refugees in neighboring countries, which went from 635,000 in 2006 to the current figure of 390,000. Almost all of them have refugee status or protection (around 385,117) and live in Chad, Egypt, Uganda, Kenya and Ethiopia.

By December 2025, at least 760,000 Sudanese refugees crossed into Chad fleeing the war in Sudan that broke out in April 2023. By March 2026, had risen to nearly one million. By 2025, UNHCR estimated that there were 1,330,950 Sudanese refugees in Chad. On 23 February 2026, Chad shut its eastern border with Sudan indefinitely, citing repeated incursions by Sudanese armed groups and growing insecurity near its territory. The decision followed heavy fighting in the border town of al-Tina between the RSF and forces aligned with the Sudanese army. Chad said limited humanitarian exemptions could still be granted with prior approval.

== Sudanese refugee camps in Chad ==
Chad hosted the largest community of Sudanese refugees, approximately 262,900 by the beginning of 2011, of whom 248,700 were assisted by the UNHCR in camps located along the Chad–Sudan border. Another estimate put the number of Sudanese refugees at 400,000 in 2007.

Due to the renewal of fighting in Darfur between the rebel group Justice and Equality Movement (JEM) and the Sudanese government, approximately 5,000 Sudanese have crossed the border to Chad in April 2010. The second largest group of refugees in Chad is from the Central African Republic, approximately 73,500 persons. In addition, the UNHCR also gives assistance to 157,200 internally displaced persons, 1,500 returnees and 35,000 displaced returnees. The total number of people assisted by UNHCR in January 2011 was 530,590. This large number is a reflection of the conflicts and the general insecurity that proliferate in this region of Africa.

Most of the Sudanese refugees who arrive to Chad are escaping from the Darfur crisis. UNHCR has established 12 camps to house them near along the border with Sudan. The camps are organized in different sectors divided by wide dirt roads, which are at the same time divided in blocks. Every refugee camp has a medical center, schools and a market, where refugees can buy or sell clothes, vegetables and goat meat. There is also a point for food distribution in each camp, to where World Food Program trucks bring the food rations (packages consisting of flour, vegetable oil, some cereal grains, sugar and salt) that are distributed to women on a monthly basis. Each family is provided a tent, which has an open fireplace for cooking and a storage place for firewood.

Chadian towns near the border with Sudan have received a significant influx of refugees. For example, the eastern town of Adré, with a local population of just 40,000, has struggled to support over 280,000 Sudanese refugees. Many refugees live in overcrowded conditions with a severe lack of infrastructure, including water, sanitation facilities, hospitals, and schools.

== Issues in the camps ==
=== Security ===
UNHCR is facing real obstacles in maintaining security in and around the camps. For years now refugees and international organization have reported thousands of human trafficking cases in the camps, where boys between the age of nine and fifteen are being recruited, forcibly or willingly, by Chadian and Sudanese armed groups. In 2007, the UN estimated that between 7,000 and 10,000 boys had been forcibly recruited in Chad to become soldiers.

UNICEF is putting a great effort on dealing with this problem, and from 2007 to 2010 it had demobilized more than 800 child soldiers, most of whom had been recruited into Chadian rebel groups. In June 2010, the Chadian government together with five other Central African countries agreed on the "N’Djamena Declaration", which calls on stopping child recruitment in armed groups and on the integration of child soldiers into civilian society.

Children in the Chadian refugee camps are also vulnerable to gender-based violence, sexual harassment, prostitution and early marriage. UNICEF has reported that girls as young as 12 are forced to marry and bear children.

=== Nutrition ===
Insecurity has prevented nutrition surveys in the camps in 2009 ad 2010. According to a survey conducted in August 2008, acute malnutrition is still found among 10 percent of the camps' population. Despite the precarious situation, it represents an improvement if compared with to 2004 (over 30 percent) and 2005 (more than 25 percent), when most of the refugees were arriving.

=== Water ===
In the camps located in northeastern Chad access to potable water is still a main challenge. At the beginning of 2011 UNHCR placed as a priority in this area the completion of boreholes and the installation of manual pumps in order to reduce dependency on electrical equipment. Provision of water in the refugee camps is 15 liters per day.

=== HIV and AIDS ===
According to UNHCR the risk of HIV and AIDS has been reduced due to prevention activities.

=== Education ===
In 2005 primary schools and education centers were established in the refugee camps with an enrollment capacity of 44,000 children. Schooling in the camps has entailed for half of the children their first chance to learn how to read and write. According to UNICEF, these schools and centers do not only provide education, but also "a sense of routine and normalcy for children caught up in conflict", access to clean water and sanitation, physical protections for refugee children and also for Chadian children from neighboring villages. UNHCR's strategies for 2011 regarding education is to improve its quality, build more schools and provide expand the post-primary education programs.

== See also ==
- Ethnic groups in Chad
