= Antoine Bangui =

Chadian writer (1933–2026)

Antoine Bangui-Rombaye (22 September 1933 – 28 January 2026) was a Chadian politician and author. Between 1962 and 1972, Bangui was a member of the cabinet. However, he fell out of favor with President François Tombalbaye and was imprisoned from 1972 to 1975. He released his account of his imprisonment, Prisonnier de Tombalbaye, in 1980. This was followed by an autobiographical novel Les Ombres de Koh (1983). Bangui ran in the 1996 presidential election and became head of the Movement for the National Reconstruction of Chad (Mouvement pour la reconstruction nationale du Tchad, MORENAT), an approved political party.

== Life and career ==
Bangui was born on 22 September 1933. In May 1999, he released Tchad: Élections Sous Contrôle (1996-1997) (ISBN 2-7384-7331-8), a scathing critique of the state of the country under Idriss Déby. The next month, the government accused Bangui of fomenting rebellion in Logone Oriental Region. In December 1999, Bangui was announced as the spokesperson for the Coordination of Armed and Political Movements of the Opposition (Coordination des mouvements armés et politiques de l'opposition, CMAP), a coalition of 13 opposition groups. Bangui eventually resigned from CMAP. He was protesting attempts at dialogue by some CMAP members, which he felt were part of Déby's strategy of splitting the opposition.

Bangui died in Avallon on 28 January 2026, at the age of 92.
