= List of lakes of Chad =

Lakes in, or bordered by, Chad include:

- Lake Chad
- Lake Fianga
- Lake Fitri
- Lake Iro
- Lake Katam
- Tibesti Soda Lake
- Lake Yoa
- Lake Tréné
- Léré Lake
