= Binder-Léré Faunal Reserve =

Protected area in Chad

- IUCN category IV (habitat/species management area)
- Location within Chad
- Location: Mayo-Kébbi, Chad
- Nearest city: Mayo-Kébbi, Chad
- Coordinates: 9.6666°N 14.4666°E
- Area: 1,350 km^{2} (520 sq mi)
- Established: 1974

Ramsar Wetland
- Official name: Réserve de faune de Binder-Léré
- Designated: 14 November 2005
- Reference no.: 1561

Binder-Léré Faunal Reserve, in south-west Chad, bordering Cameroon, was established in 1974, covering an area of 1,350 km^{2} (520 sq mi). It has been designated as a Ramsar site since 2005.

== Geography ==
The terrain, which lies in an elevation range of 400–500 m (1,300–1,600 ft), has rock exposures and eroded soils. It forms a transition zone between open forest and savanna woodland. The park is drained by the Mayo-Kébbi River flowing from east to west and Gauthiot Falls lies here. On the western part of the reserve there are the Léré Lake and Tréné Lake through which the Mayo-Kébbi flows. The river runs in a westerly direction, enters Cameroon, then Nigeria and finally debouches into the Niger River system.

Léré Lake has a length of 14.5 km (9.0 mi) with a width of 4 km (2.5 mi). Tréné Lake has a length of 6 km (3.7 mi) and width of 2 km (1.2 mi). The Touboiris marsh and Loké marsh are close to the headwaters of the Mayo-Kébbi River which is a plain area but outside the limits of the reserve. The mean annual incidence of rainfall in the reserve ranges between 800–950 mm (31–37 in).

=== Flora ===
Vegetation consists of species of leguminous tree species and Combretum woodland in the southern and northern zones of the reserve. Terminalia and Boswellia genera are the dominant plants.

=== Fauna ===
Migrant Palearctic waterbirds are recorded in Léré Lake and Tréné Lake. Lesser kestrel and two species of the Sahel biome are reported. The reserve has been designated an Important Bird Area (IBA) by BirdLife International because it supports significant populations of red-throated bee-eaters, Senegal eremomelas, Gambaga flycatchers, chestnut-crowned sparrow-weavers, black-rumped waxbills and Sahel bush sparrows.

West African manatees are found in good numbers; 100 were reported in the 1980s. However, poaching by hunters from Cameroon is very extensive and a wildlife monitoring system with village guards has been instituted.
