= Ounianga Kebir =

Ounianga Kebir may refer to

- Ounianga Kébir (town), Chad
- Lakes of Ounianga, Chad
