= Lac Léré =

Lac Léré may refer to:

- Lac Léré Department, a department in Mayo-Kebbi Ouest, Chad
- Lac Léré (lake), a lake in Chad
