= Lake Tréné =

Lake in south-western Chad

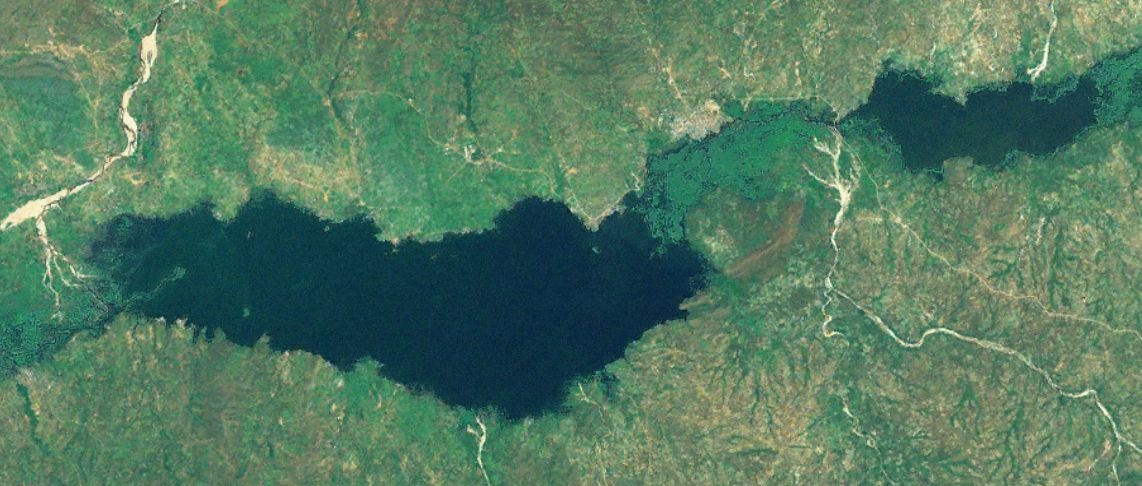
- Lake Léré left and Lake Tréné right with Léré in between

- Location within Chad
- Location: Mayo-Kebbi Ouest Region; Chad; about 6 km east of the border with Cameroon
- Coordinates: 9°39′19″N 14°17′15″E
- Primary inflows: Mayo Kébbi
- Primary outflows: Mayo Kébbi
- Basin countries: Chad
- Max. length: 6 km (3.7 mi)
- Max. width: 2 km (1.2 mi)

Lake Tréné is a small lake located in the Mayo-Kebbi Ouest Region of south-western Chad. It is about 6km by 2km and is fed by the Mayo Kébbi river that leaves near Léré and proceeds through the larger Lake Léré.
