= YOA =

YOA or Yoa can refer to:

- Young Offenders Act, a now-repealed Canadian act in force from 1984 to 2003
- Ekati Airport, an airport located at the Ekati Diamond Mine, Northwest Territories, Canada, by ICAO code
- Lake Yoa, a lake in northern Chad
