= Stefan Kröpelin =

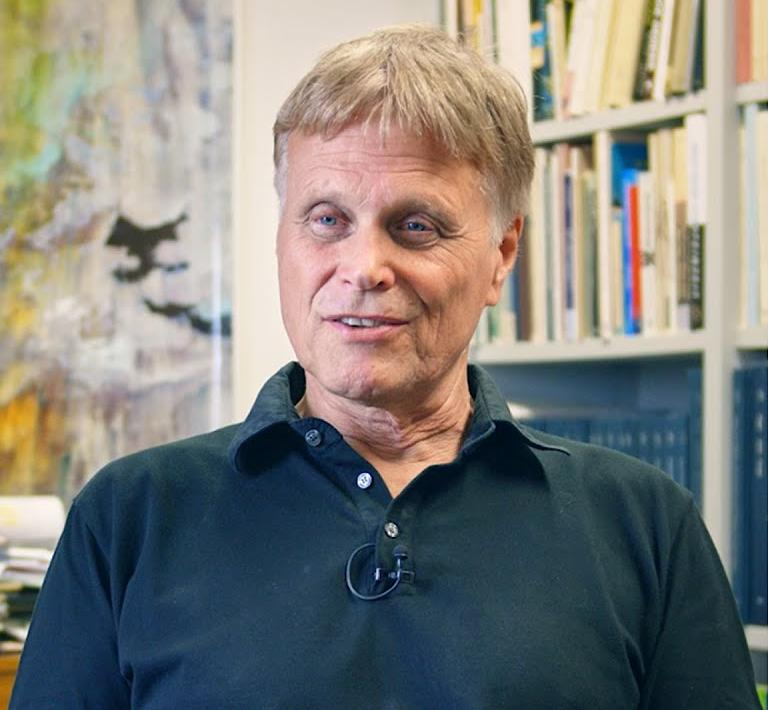
- Scientific career
- Fields: Sahara; Geology; Climate change
- Workplaces: University of Cologne
- Website: www.sfb806.de/kroepelin

Stefan Kröpelin is a geologist and climate researcher at the University of Cologne who specializes in studying the eastern Sahara desert and its climatic history. In 2017, he was awarded with the Communicator Award of the Deutsche Forschungsgemeinschaft for the excellent communication of his research both in Germany and international.

== Research ==
The journal Nature described Kröpelin as "one of the most devoted Sahara explorers of our time." According to Siddiq Abd Algadir, president of the Sudanese Geologists' Union in Khartoum and a fellow student with Kröpelin in the 1980s, "Much of what we now know about the geology, the environments and even the people in some of the most remote parts of the Sahara, we really owe to [Stefan Kröpelin] and the expeditions he has led."

Contrary to other evidence that the Sahara suddenly changed from a wet to dry climate 5,000 years ago, Kröpelin's core samples at Lake Yoa suggests the transition took longer, some 3,000 years from 5,600 to 2,700 BC.

Kröpelin was instrumental in fighting to have the Lakes of Ounianga in Chad listed as a UNESCO World Heritage Site in 2012. He was actively lobbying to have the Ennedi Plateau added as well that has been inscribed as Africa's 6th mixed Natural and Cultural World Heritage property in July 2016.
