= Léré Airport =

- IATA: none; ICAO: none

Summary
- Airport type: Public
- Serves: Léré
- Location: Chad
- Elevation AMSL: 787 ft / 240 m
- Coordinates: 09°38′45.1″N 014°10′23.7″E

Map
- Location of Léré Airport in Chad

Runways
Direction	Length		Surface
Direction	ft	m	Surface
05/23	2,520	768	Grass
- Source: Landings.com

Léré Airport is a public use airport located near Léré, Mayo-Kebbi Ouest, Chad.

== See also ==
- List of airports in Chad
