= Aaron Padacké Zegoubé =

Chadian film director

Aaron Padacké Zégoubé
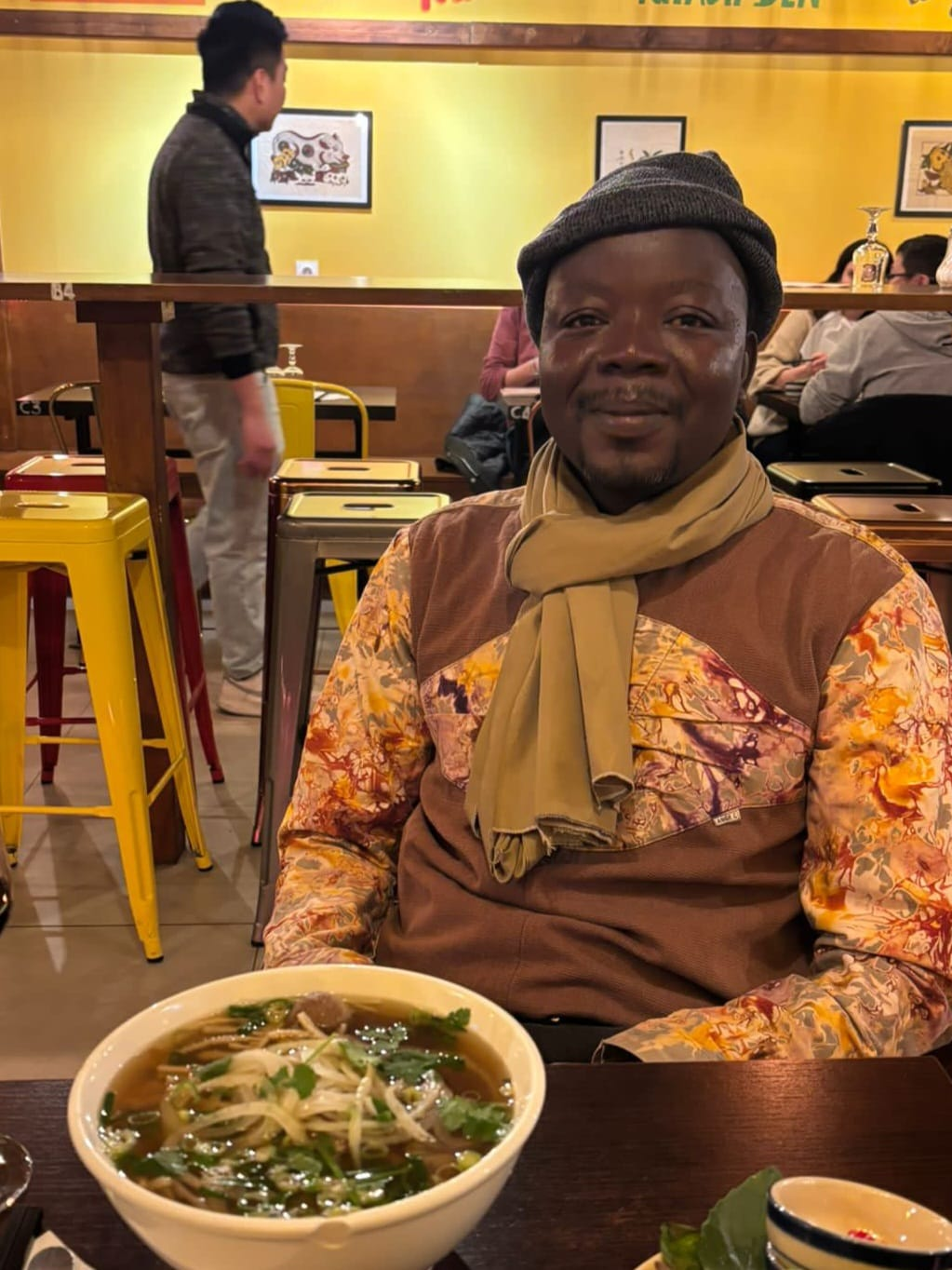
- Born: March 24, 1989 (age 37); Pala, Mayo-Kebbi Ouest, Chad
- Occupations: Director, filmmaker
- Known for: Founder of Les ateliers de Toumaï
- Awards: Best Feature Documentary Award (CICAO 2024)

Aaron Padacké Zégoubé (born March 24, 1989 in Pala in the Mayo Keby-Ouest region) is a Chadian director and filmmaker. He is the founder of the film lab, Les ateliers de Toumaï. He won the Best Feature Documentary Award at CICAO 2024 for his documentary Sur les traces de Toumai (2019).
