= Léré Lake =

Lake in Chad

Coordinates: 9°37′N 14°10′E

Lake Léré
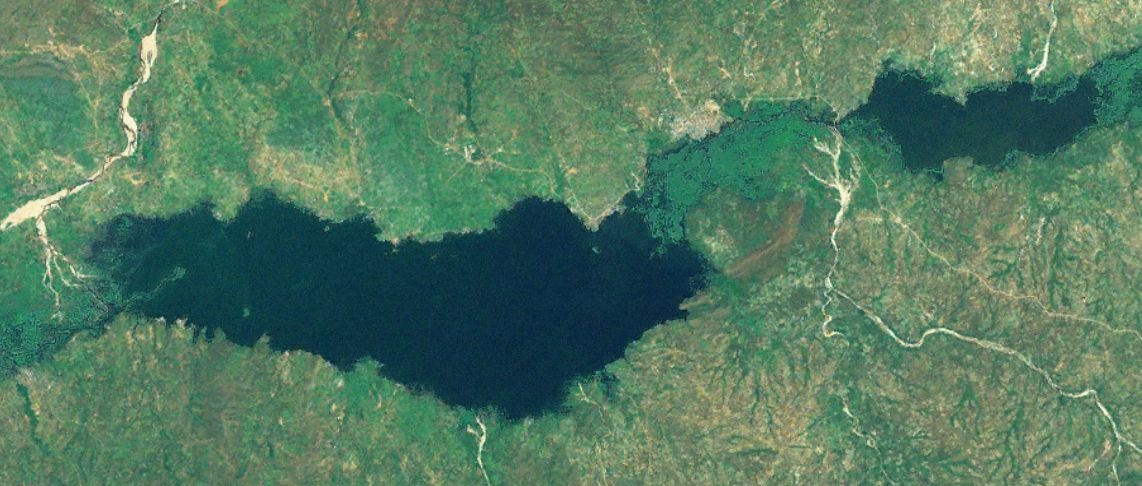
- Lake Léré left and Lake Tréné right with Léré in between

- Location within Chad
- Location: Mayo-Kebbi Ouest Region; Chad; about 6 km east of the border with Cameroon
- Primary inflows: Mayo Kébbi
- Primary outflows: Mayo Kébbi
- Basin countries: Chad
- Max. length: 15 km (9.3 mi)
- Max. width: 5 km (3.1 mi)
- Surface area: 41 km^{2} (16 sq mi)
- Average depth: 4.5 m (15 ft)
- Max. depth: 8 m (26 ft)
- Water volume: 0.16 km^{3} (130,000 acre⋅ft)
- Surface elevation: 320 m (1,050 ft)
- Islands: 7 bigger and some small
- Settlements: Léré

Lake Léré is a lake in the Mayo-Kebbi Ouest Region in southwestern Chad about 6 km east of the border with Cameroon. It is fed by the Mayo Kébbi that leaves near Léré the smaller Lake Tréné.
