= Lake Katam =

Lake in Chad

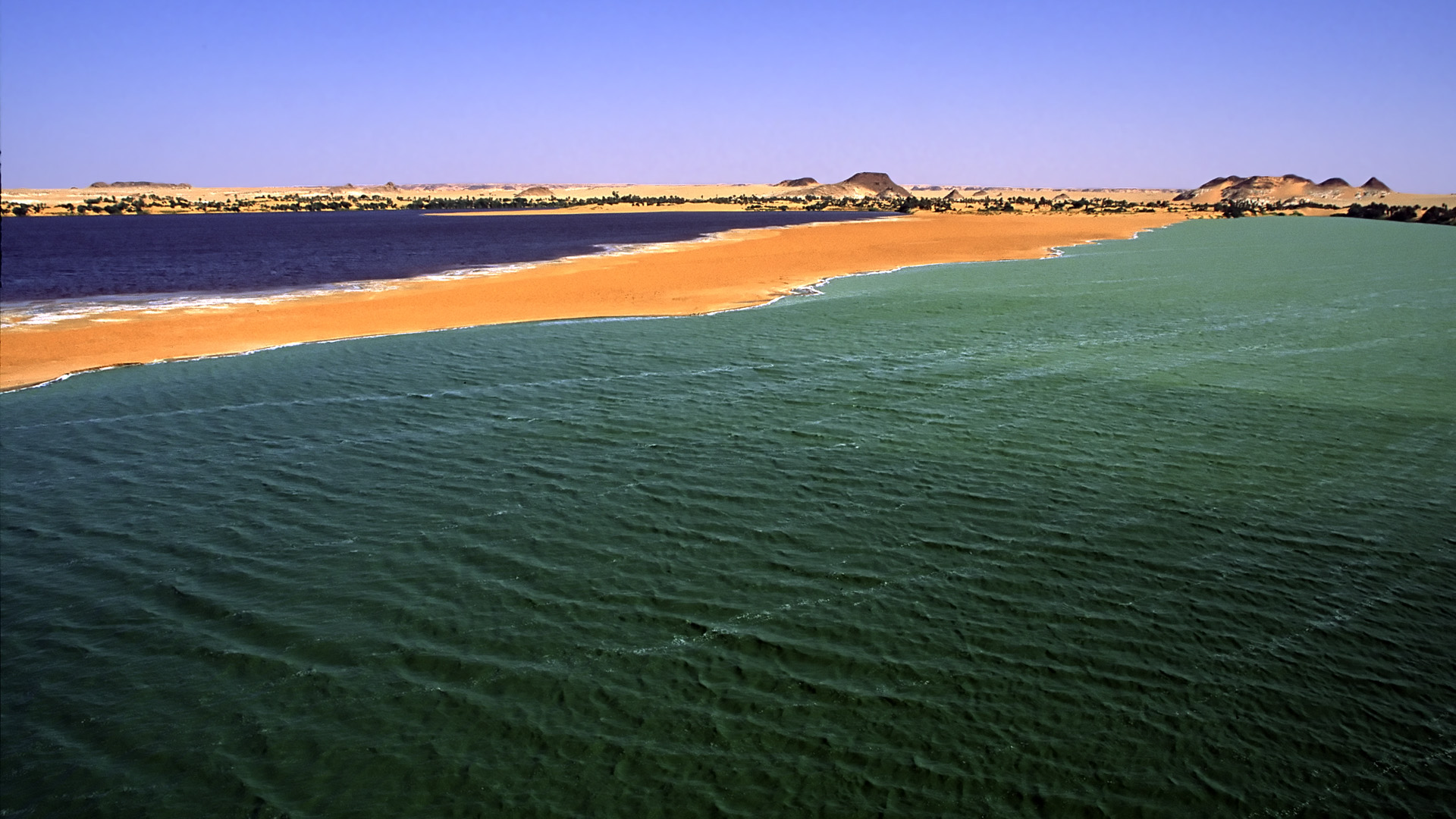

- Location within Chad Location within Africa
- Location: Sahara Chad
- Coordinates: 19°1′N 20°30′E
- Primary inflows: subsurface; evaporation
- Primary outflows: subsurface
- Basin countries: Chad
- Max. length: 2.4 km (1.5 mi)
- Max. width: 1 km (0.62 mi)
- Surface elevation: 377 m (1,237 ft)

Lake Katam is a lake in the Ounianga Kebir group, a lake system in the Borkou-Ennedi-Tibesti Region in the north-east basin of Chad. These lakes are notable for their running in the north–south headlands, by the Trade wind are formed. They are the remnant of a much larger lake that filled the basin during the so-called green Sahara-time, which lasted from about BC 10000–1500.

Lake Katam is one of the two main lakes in the area (the other being Lake Yoa), and all are saline.

== See also ==
- Lake Yoa
- Lakes of Ounianga
