= List of Ramsar sites in Chad =

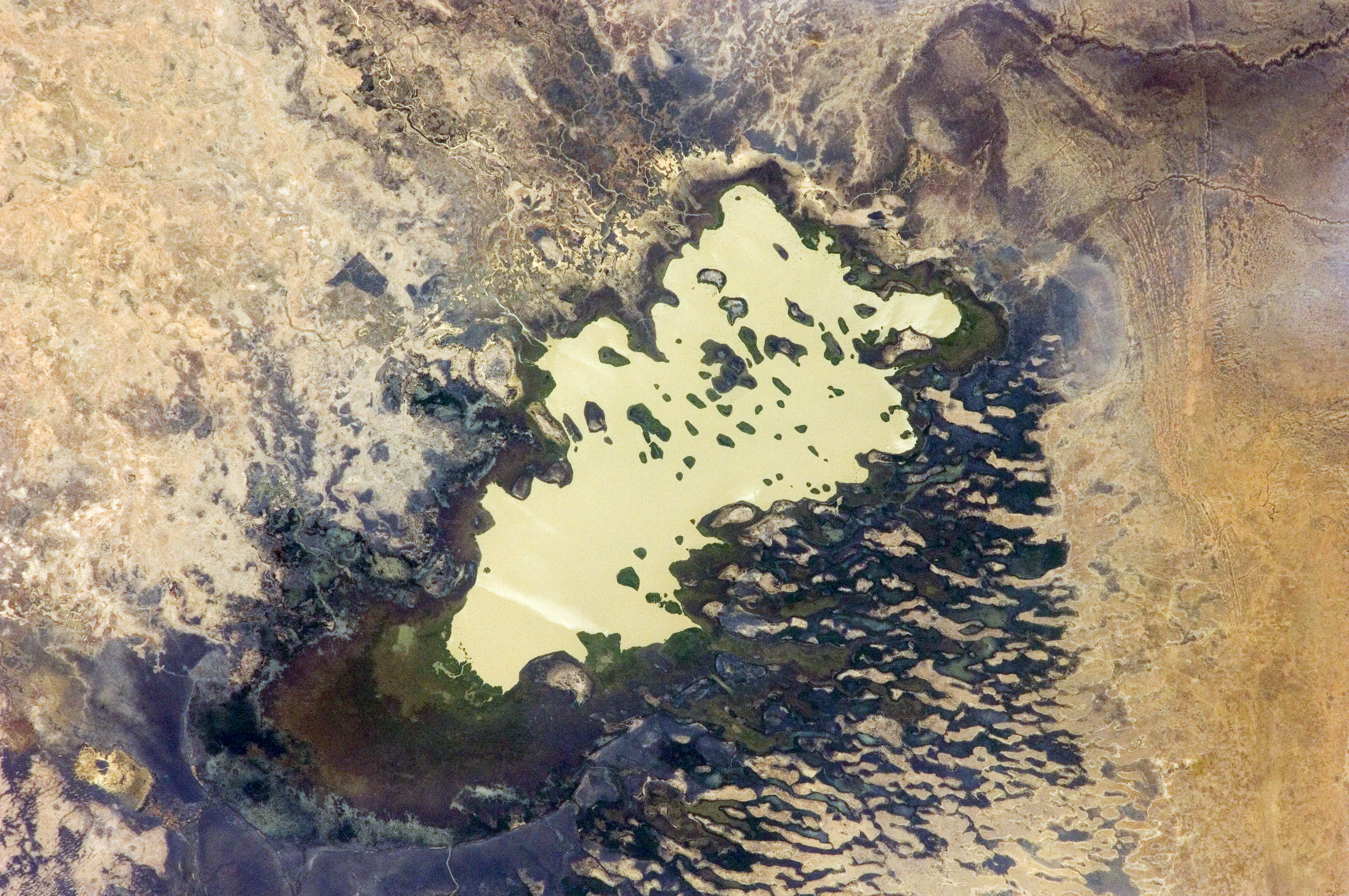
Satellite image of Lake Fitri

Ramsar sites in Chad refer to the six sites designated as Ramsar Wetlands of International Importance in Chad. They cover an area of 124,050.68 square kilometres (47,896.24 sq mi). They include Lac Fitri, Partie tchadienne du lac Tchad, Plaine de Massenya, Plaines d'inondation des Bahr Aouk et Salamat, and Réserve de faune de Binder-Léré.

== Lac Fitri ==
The Lac Fitri Ramsar Site measures 1,950 square kilometres (750 sq mi) in size and was established on 13 June 1990. The Lake Fitri expands substantially during the rainy season, varying from year to year. Swamps encircle the lake periphery over a length of 150 km. Echinochloa stagnina, Vossia cuspidata and Nymphaea aquatica are the common vegetation types noted while Acacia nilotica and Mitragyna inermis grow in the flooded zone of the lake. The fringe land area around the lake has annual grasses and sedge. Also, as an Important Bird Area it has both breeding and non-breeding species. It is wintering ground for a large number of Palearctic waterbirds. The large number of bird species recorded here are Aythya nyroca, Balearica pavonina, Ardeola ralloides, Platalea alba, Dendrocygna bicolor, Dendrocygna viduata, Anas acuta, and Anas querquedula. It provides refuge during the drought season to Afrotropical species and elephants. It is also known as a productive fishing lake with an annual fish catch of 3,000 tonnes.

== Partie tchadienne du lac Tchad ==
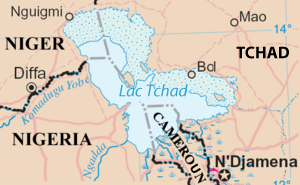
Map of Lake Chad

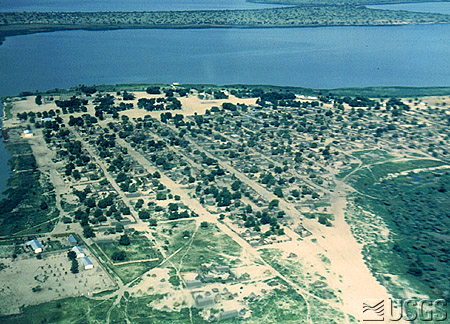
Lake Chad at Bol (1971)

The Partie tchadienne du lac Tchad Ramsar Site measures 16,481.68 square kilometres (6,363.61 sq mi) in size. It was established as a Ramsar Wetland site in 2001 It is part of the greater transboundary Lake Chad shared with Cameroon, Niger, and Nigeria. The Partie tchadienne du lac Tchad was established under a cooperative effort of the Government of Chad, the Lake Chad Basin Commission, the Ramsar Bureau, World Wide Fund for Nature (WWF), International Union for Conservation of Nature (IUCN), the Global Environment Facility (GEF), the World Bank, and the United Nations Development Programme(UNDP). It covers the Chad part of Lake Chad bordering a cordon of dunes on the northeast called the "erg" while the southern limits of the lake consists of plains. It is a composite of "open waters, islets and sandbanks, polders, oases and temporary and permanent "natron" or alkalai pools" covering all the four nations which share it. Apart from water birds, it has about 150 fish species; the Kouri Ox is an endemic and threatened species here. The lake's flows are regulated and it also helps inn replenishing ground water. It provides livelihood for 3 million fisher folk. Cattle, sheep and camel are also raised on its banks. Blue algae (spiruline) is also an important product from the lake.

== Plaine de Massenya ==
The Plaine de Massenya Ramsar Site measures 25,260 square kilometres (9,750 sq mi) in size. It was established on 17 October 2008 in southwestern regions of the Chad Basin. The Plaine de Massenya wetland consists of freshwater marshes, rivers, streams and creeks. It provides flood moderation, retains the sediment load, and helps in recharge of ground water. Apart from 366 species of birds, there are also wildlife faunal species of African elephant, leopards, Nile crocodile and many more. Fish species also are in abundance and they feed on the plant species Echinachloa that thrive in the lake. People living in the area sustain their livelihood by fishing, agriculture and rearing of livestock.

== Plaines d'inondation des Bahr Aouk et Salamat ==
The Plaines d'inondation des Bahr Aouk et Salamat Ramsar Site measures 49,220 square kilometres (19,000 sq mi) in size and is one of the world's largest Ramsar sites. It was established on 1 June 2006, and is situated in a natural depression bordering the Central Africa Republic. The Plaines d'inondation des Bahr Aouk et Salamat wetland, which also subsumes the Zakouma National Park, provides sustenance to the wildlife of the area. Migratory waterbirds are a common sight. Fauna reported are species of hippos, leopards, elephants and many kinds antelopes. It is an important habitat for fish breeding and the annual fish catch is reported to be 15,000 tonnes. The wetlands fauna is threatened by poaching and vegetation is subject to intense grazing and also forest fires which need to be suitably addressed through community participatory management and environmental education. In this context, GEF has also launched a pilot project in the area. After the civil war which ravaged the area, the Zakouma National Park has been strengthened with induction of elephants, giraffes and lions with assistance from the European Union.

== Plaines d'inondation du Logone et les dépressions Toupouri ==
The Plaines d'inondation du Logone et les dépressions Toupouri Ramsar Site covers an area of 29,789 square kilometres (11,502 sq mi). It was established on 14 November 2005 and is one of Africa's largest wetlands. The Plaines d'inondation du Logone et les dépressions Toupouri wetland has number of water bodies in the form of rivers, permanent and temporary ponds, flood plains and lakes. In this widely varying ecosystem, the flora consists of many species including the African Palmyra palm and the néré (Parkia biglobosa) which are in the threatened list. The avi fauna consists of Occidental Palearctic and Ethiopian migratory species such as the black crowned-crane, spur-winged goose and whistling duck'. Fishing is year round vocation of the people who reside in the wetland. The threats faced in the wetland relate to poaching, overgrazing, forest fires, oil exploration and pesticide. The GEF, World Bank, UNDP and Lake Chad Basin Commission have launched a project for its management.

== Réserve de faune de Binder-Léré ==
Réserve de faune de Binder-Léré Ramsar Site covers an area of 1,350 square kilometres (520 sq mi). It was established as Ramsar Wetland reserve on 14 November 2005 on the Chad-Cameroonian border in Mayo-Kebbi administrative region. The wetland consists of lakes, ephemeral and perennial streams, and marshes. The Gauthiot Waterfalls on the Gauthiot River acts as barrier for movement of fish species from the Niger River, upstream into the Lake Chad. The local Moundang tribals hold this falls in veneration. The site hosts a number faunal species of manatee, crocodiles, hippos, and cheetahs which are in the endangered list. It is habitat for waterbirds and some of the species are Dendrocygna spp., Balearica pavonina, Pelecanus rufescens and Plectropterus gambensis. Fishing, agriculture, hunting and rearing of livestock are the vocations of the local people for sustenence.
