= Kébir Airport =

Airport in Chad

- IATA: none; ICAO: none

Summary
- Airport type: Public
- Serves: Ounianga, Chad
- Elevation AMSL: 418 m / 1,371 ft
- Coordinates: 18°58′N 020°30′E

Map
- Location of airport in Chad

Runways
Direction	Length		Surface
Direction	m	ft	Surface
04/22	1,320	4,331	Sand
- Source: AIS ASECNA

Kébir Airport (Arabic: مطار كبير) is an airstrip serving Ounianga, a town in the Ennedi-Ouest Region of northern Chad.

== Facilities ==
The airport resides at an elevation of 418 metres (1,371 ft) above mean sea level. It has one runway designated 04/22 with a sand surface measuring 1,320 by 20 metres (4,331 ft × 66 ft).
