= Gauthiot Falls =

- Interactive map of Gauthiot Falls
- Location: Chad
- Coordinates: 9°43′27″N 14°33′40″E
- Longest drop: 17 m (56 ft)

The Gauthiot Falls are a series of cascade waterfalls considered a natural wonder in Chad. They are situated about halfway down the course of the Mayo Kébbi river, found in southern Chad. Downstream from the falls, the flow of the Mayo Kébbi joins the Benue River, which itself is a tributary of the Niger River, which ultimately flows into the Atlantic Ocean. The Gauthiot Falls are not a notably high cascade; all together, they descend only about 17 metres (56 ft). They are considered of interest because of their position between the drainage systems of the Mayo Kébbi and the Logone River.

The Mayo Kébbi and the Logone have their source in a series of lakes and marshes on a flat plain, which is fed by rain during the brief wet season. Some of the water drains into the Logone, which feeds Lake Chad, and some drains into Mayo Kébbi, eventually reaching the Gauthiot Falls. Erosion caused by debris in the water is gradually wearing away at the falls, causing their location to move slowly upstream.

It is speculated by geologists that eventually, many thousands of years in the future, the water flowing through the Gauthiot Falls will erode their position so far upstream that they will consume the entire flow of the Logone River. At that point, the waters of the Logone will no longer feed into Lake Chad, which will shrink drastically due to the loss of a major water supply.

== See also ==
- List of waterfalls
