= Lac Léré Department =

Department of Chad

Coordinates: 9°37′N 14°10′E

Lac Léré (Arabic: بحيرة ليري) is one of two departments in Mayo-Kebbi Ouest, a region of Chad. Its capital is Léré.

== See also ==
- Departments of Chad
