= Ounianga Kébir (town) =

Ounianga Kébir أونيانغا كبير
- Location in Chad
- Coordinates: 19°03′18″N 020°29′14″E
- Country: Chad
- Region: Ennedi (since 2008)
- Department: Ennedi
- Sub-Prefecture: Ounianga
- Elevation: 1,299 ft (396 m)

Population (2010)
  - Total: 10,000
- Time zone: UTC+1 (WAT)

Ounianga Kébir (Arabic: أونيانغا كبير) is a town in the Sahara Desert in the Ennedi Region of northern Chad. Located within the Ennedi Department, Ounianga also makes up a sub-prefecture.

== History ==
In 1871, a Senussi zawaya was established in Ounianga Kébir. According to W.J. Harding King of the Royal Geographical Society, in the 1920s, Ounianga (or Wanjunga) Kébir and Ounianga Serir were a part of a district called Wanjungat, which according to him had its own language and sultan named Mayna. This sultanate remained under firm Senussi influence until November of 1929, when French soldiers occupied several posts in the Ennedi region, including Ounianga Kébir. During French administration, the nomadic tribes in the region were hardly subdued, and did not pay taxes or obey French laws.

In late 1987, during the final days of the Toyota War, Chadian soldiers intercepted a Libyan column en route to Ounianga Kébir. They routed the soldiers north, across the Libyan border, and took Maaten al-Sarra air base.

On January 13, 2007, The rebel group Union Forces for Democracy and Development (UFDD) attacked and briefly occupied Ounianga Kébir at dawn. Later that day, it was attacked by Chadian government soldiers, who claimed they took the city and pursued the rebels, leaving three wounded Chadian soldiers and two wounded rebels and one dead.

== Transport ==
The town is served by Kébir Airport.

== Geography ==
Ounianga Kébir is located next to the Lakes of Ounianga. The area is part of the Sahara Desert and is a hot and hyperarid desert that features less than 2 millimetres (0.1 in) of rainfall a year. The town is in a basin between the mountains of Tibesti to the west and Ennedi to the east.
