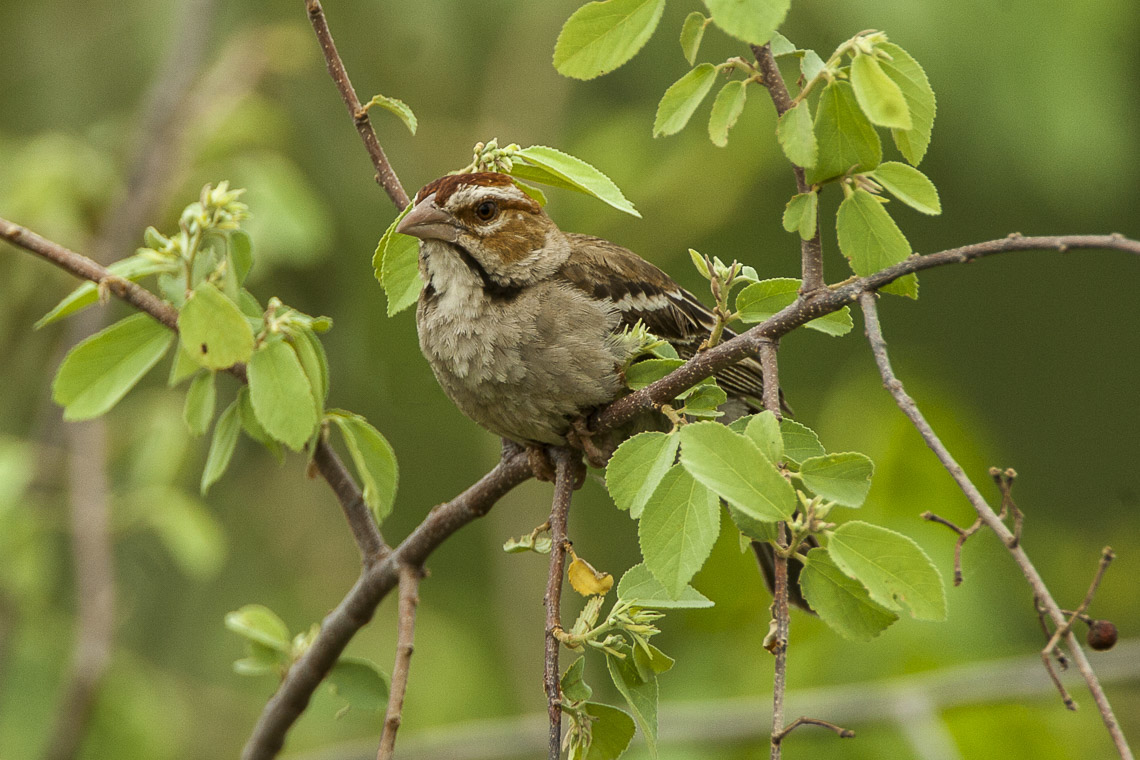

Conservation status
- Least Concern (IUCN 3.1)

Scientific classification
- Kingdom: Animalia
- Phylum: Chordata
- Class: Aves
- Order: Passeriformes
- Family: Ploceidae
- Genus: Plocepasser
- Species: P. superciliosus

Binomial name
- Plocepasser superciliosus (Cretzschmar, 1827)

= Chestnut-crowned sparrow-weaver =

Species of bird

The chestnut-crowned sparrow-weaver (Plocepasser superciliosus) is a species of bird in the family Ploceidae.

It is found in Africa south of the Sahara, from Senegal and Gambia to Eritrea, Ethiopia and western Kenya.
