= Lake Fianga =

Lake in Chad and Cameroon

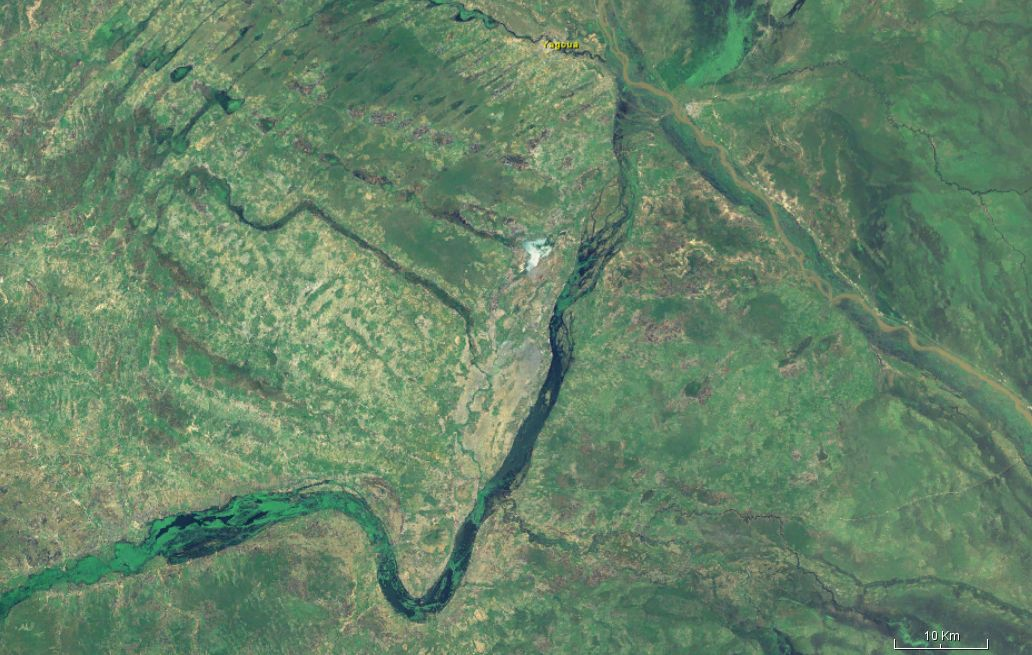
- The Lake Fianga (center) with the Logone in the east and the canal to the Mayo Kebi in the south west.

- Location within Cameroon Location within Africa
- Coordinates: 9°58′N 15°12′E
- Primary inflows: Logone River
- Primary outflows: Mayo Kebbi
- Basin countries: Chad, Cameroon

Lake Fianga is a lake in Chad and Cameroon. It does not have clearly delineated borders, as it forms the western border of an area of permanent swampland. The lake forms with the seasonal flooding of the Logone River.
