= Mayo-Kebbi Ouest =

Region of Chad

Coordinates: 9°21′48″N 14°54′36″E

Mayo-Kebbi Ouest مايو كيبي الغربية
- Region
- Map of Chad showing Mayo-Kebbi Ouest.
- Country: Chad
- Departments: 2
- Sub-prefectures: 8
- Regional capital: Pala

Population (2009)
  - Total: 564,470
- Time zone: UTC+01:00 (WAT)

Mayo-Kebbi Ouest (Arabic: مايو كيبي الغربية) is one of the 23 provinces of Chad. Its capital is Pala. It is composed of the southern areas of the former prefecture of Mayo-Kebbi (sub-prefectures of Pala and Léré).

== Geography ==
The province borders Mayo-Kebbi Est Region to the north-east, Tandjilé Region to the east, Logone Occidental Region to the south-east, and Cameroon to the west and north-west. The Mayo Kébbi river flows through the north the province, with Lake Léré and the smaller Lake Tréné located in the north-west.

=== Settlements ===
Pala is the capital of the province; other major settlements include Binder, Guégou, Lagon, Lamé, Léré and Torrock.

== Demographics ==
As per the 2009 Chadian census, Mayo-Kebbi Ouest had 564,470 inhabitants. The main ethnolinguistic groups are the Fula, Gidar, Mangbai, Mundang, Ngeté-Herdé peoples, Peve, Sara groups such as the Ngambay, and Tupuri.

== Subdivisions ==
The province of Mayo-Kebbi Ouest is divided into four departments:

Department	Capital	Sub-prefectures
El-Ouaya	Lagon	Lagon, Bissi-Mafou, Guelo, Guetalet
Lac Léré	Léré	Binder, Guégou, Lagon, Léré
Mayo-Binder	Binder	Binder, Mboursou, Mbraou, Ribao
Mayo-Dallah	Pala	Gagal, Lamé, Pala, Torrock
