= Léré, Chad =

Léré ليري
- Town
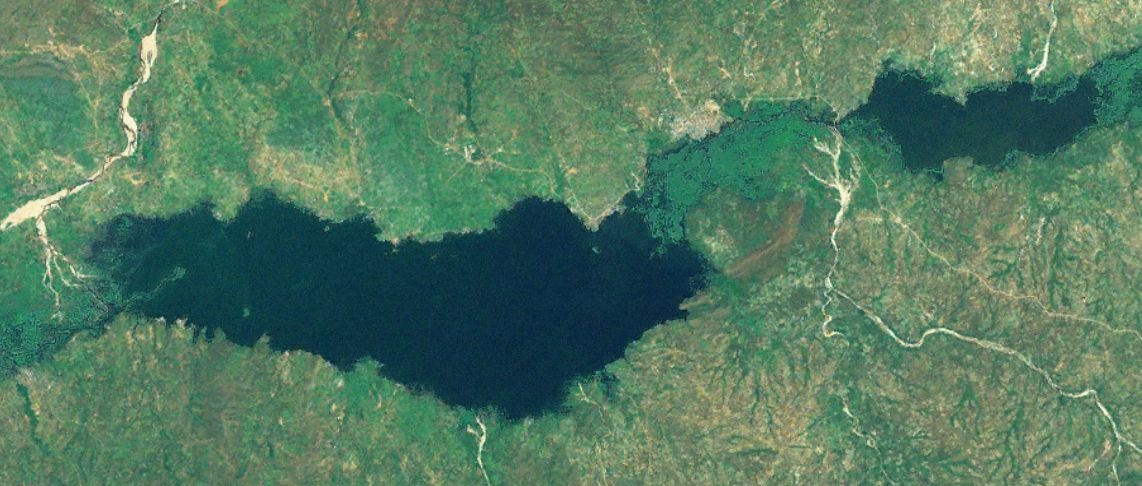
- Lake Lere and Lake Trene

- Location in Chad
- Coordinates: 9°39′26″N 14°13′42″E
- Country: Chad
- Region: Mayo-Kebbi Ouest
- Department: Lac Léré
- Sub-prefecture: Léré

Population (2009)
  - Total: 89,237

Léré (Arabic: ليري) is a town in Chad and the capital of the Lac Léré department of the Mayo-Kebbi Ouest region. In 2009, the population of Léré was 89,237, 42,987 of which were male and 46,250 were female.

The town is served by Léré Airport.
