= Lake Yoa =

Lake in Chad

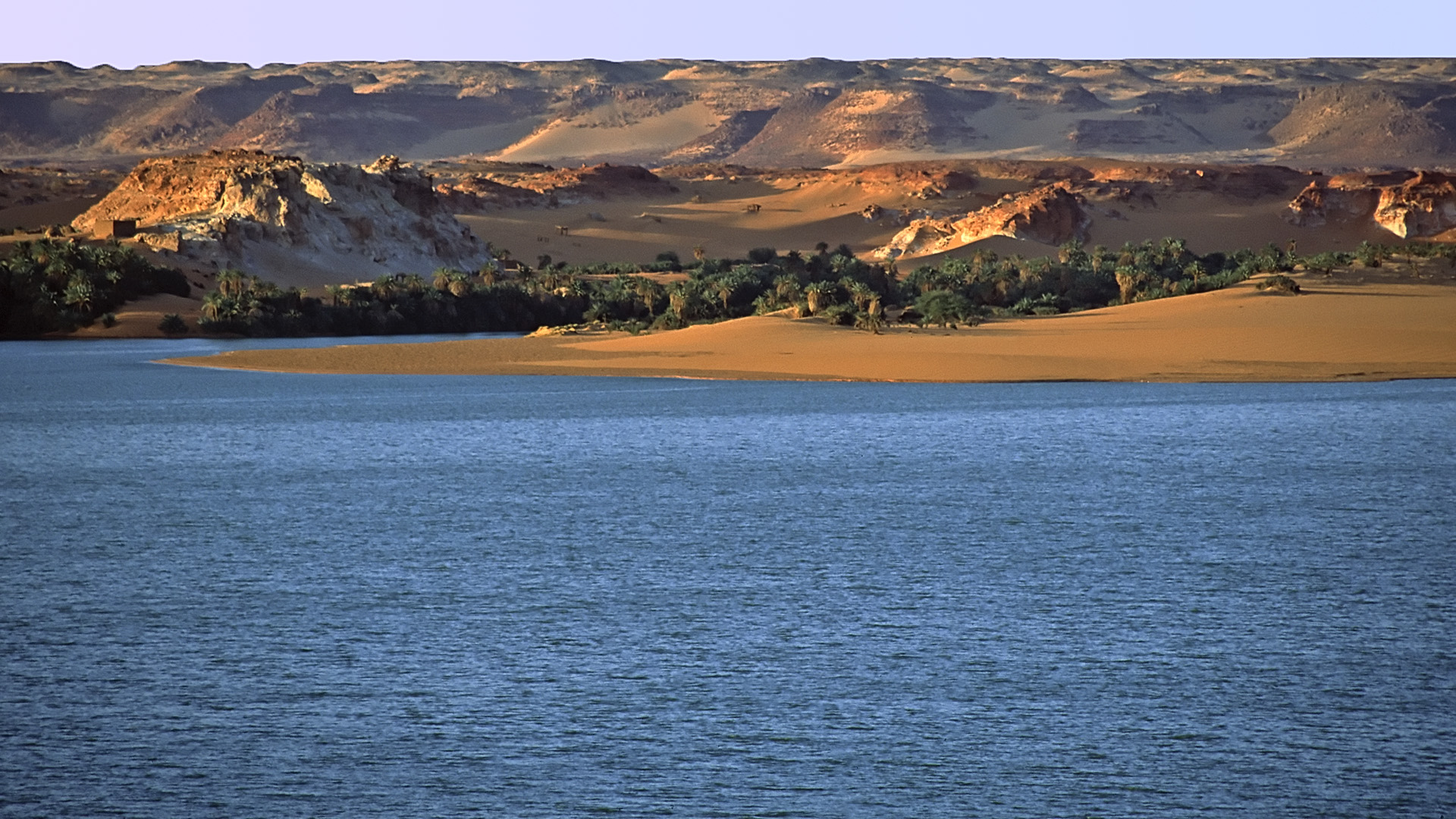

- Location within Chad
- Location: Ounianga Kebir, Sahara
- Coordinates: 19°03′N 20°31′E
- Primary inflows: underground aquifer
- Primary outflows: evaporation, subsurface drainage
- Basin countries: Chad
- Max. length: 3.5 km (2.2 mi)
- Max. width: 2.5 km (1.6 mi)
- Surface area: 4 km^{2} (1.5 sq mi)
- Max. depth: 26 m (85 ft)
- Surface elevation: 378 m (1,240 ft)

Lake Yoa is the most famous, and second largest, of the Lakes of Ounianga, a series of Lakes in Borkou-Ennedi-Tibesti Region basin of northeastern Chad. It is located in the Ounianga Kebir about 40 km west of Ounianga Sarir. These lakes are remnants of a much larger lake which occupied this basin during the African Humid period, which lasted from approximately 15,000 to 5,500 years before present. There are currently 15 lakes in the basin with a total surface area of approximately 20 kilometres (12 mi) square.

== Climate change ==
Lake Yoa recently became of interest in the study of global climate trends when a team headed by Stefan Kröpelin, of the University of Cologne, recovered a core of sediment from the bottom of the lake. Because Lake Yoa has been in existence continuously since the Humid Period its waters have protected the sediments accumulated at the bottom from erosion and dispersal. After analysis of the pollen preserved in the core, Kröpelin and his colleagues concluded that the shift from forest to desert in the area of Lake Yoa occurred gradually, with intervening periods of scrubland and grassland before the onset of full desert conditions. This conclusion contrasts with work done by Peter deMenocal of Columbia University and colleagues, who in 2000 drilled a core of ocean sediment off the western coast of Mauritania. Because of the dust levels in this core, deMenocal and his co-authors concluded that desert conditions came on quickly, over a period of a few centuries.

The discrepancies between these two accounts are not surprising given the differences in the data examined. The ocean core represents what is essentially a mass survey of the entire northern portion of the African land mass while the Lake Yoa data would survey more specifically conditions in the areas to the south and west of it, which supplied material to the prevailing trade winds of Holocene time before they crossed Lake Yoa. It is possible both that, northern Africa became quickly and generally drier, and that, in specific areas the process of desertification moved through a series of more gradual ecological transitions. (Ranson, 2008). The second report also did not take into account the geographic distance Lake Yoa is from the Atlantic Ocean, over 2,000 kilometres (1,000 mi).
