= Lakes of Ounianga =

UNESCO World Heritage Site
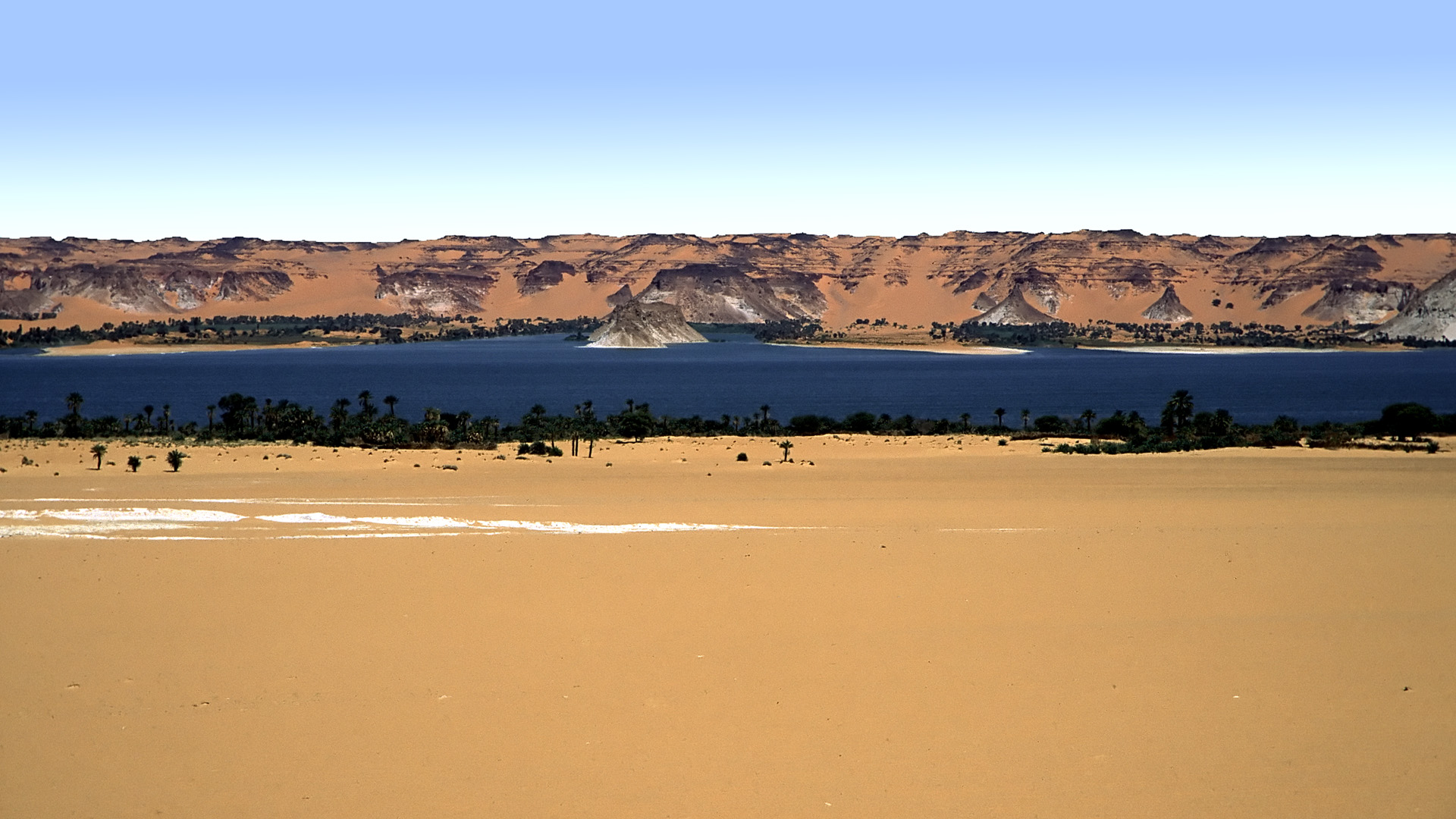
- Ounianga Sérir

- Location within Chad
- Location: Ennedi Ouest, Chad
- Criteria: Natural: (vii)
- Reference: 1400
- Inscription: 2012 (36th Session)
- Area: 628.08 km^{2} (155,200 acres)
- Buffer zone: 48.69 km^{2} (12,030 acres)
- Coordinates: 19°03′18″N 20°30′20″E

Topographic Map of the Ennedi Plateau. Ounianga Sérir is located on the left, at the top.

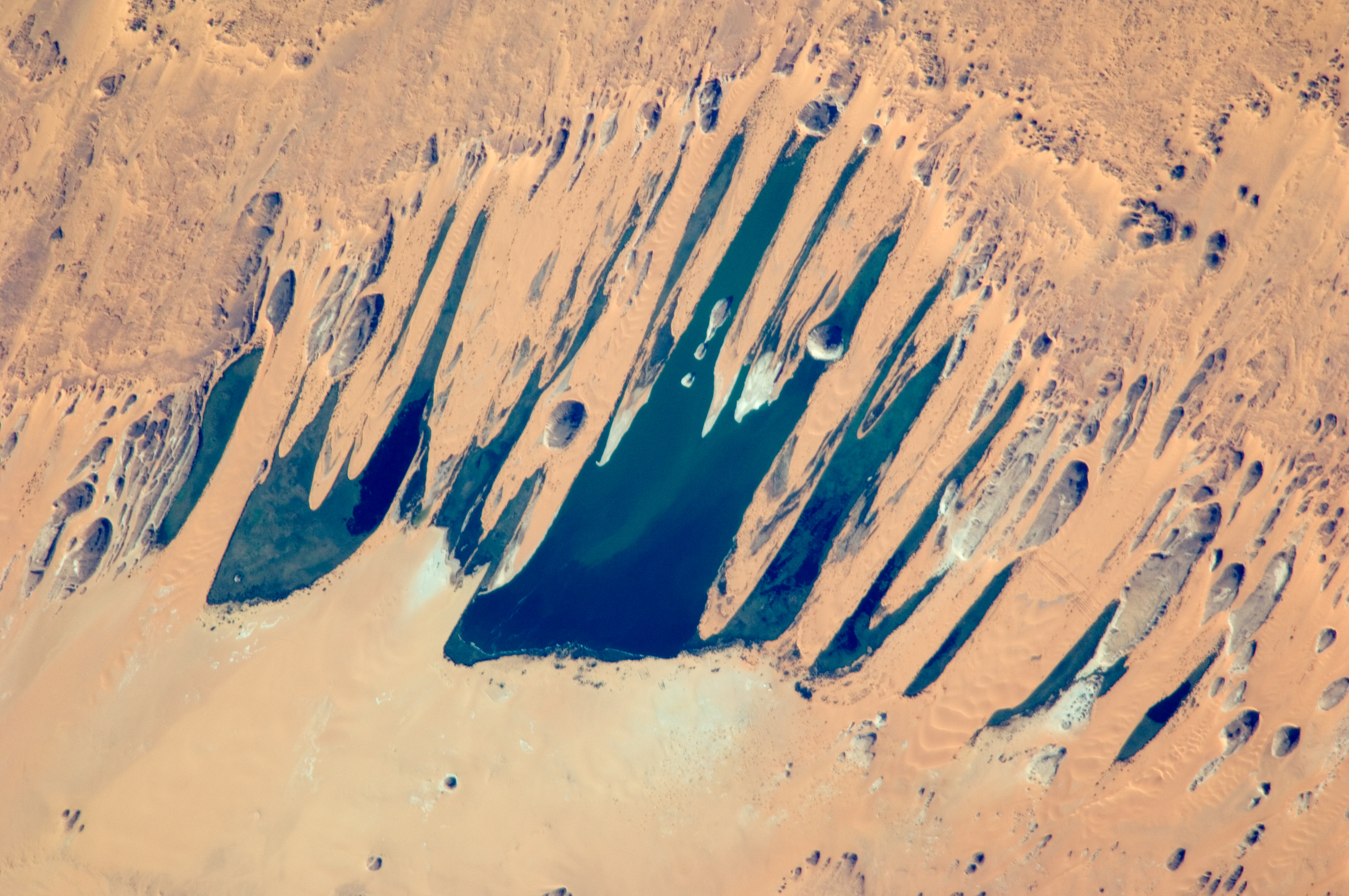
A 2009 astronaut's view of the Ounianga Sérir group. The image covers approximately 11 by 9 kilometres (7 by 6 mi). The dark surface of water is divided by linear, orange sand dunes that intrude into the depression of the lakes from the northeast.

The Lakes of Ounianga (French: Lacs d'Ounianga, Arabic: بحيرات أونيانجا, romanized: Buḥayrāt ʾUniyāngā) is a series of lakes in the Sahara Desert, occupying a basin in the mountains of West Tibesti and Ennedi East in north-eastern Chad. It was added as a UNESCO World Heritage site in 2012.

According to the UNESCO description, the lakes are in a hot and hyperarid desert that features a rainfall of less than 2 millimetres (0.1 in) a year. The lakes exhibit a variety of sizes, depths, chemical compositions and colorations.

There is a total of 18 lakes in groups as follows:

- Ounianga Kébir group: Lake Yoa, Lake Katam, Lake Oma (or Ouma), Lake Béver, Lake Midji, Lake Forodom;
- Lake Motro, about 30 kilometres (19 mi) southeast of Ounianga Kébir;
- Ounianga Sérir group about 45 to 60 kilometres (28 to 37 mi) southeast of Ounianga Kébir: Lake Melekui, Lake Dirke, Lake Ardjou, Lake Téli, Lake Obrom, Lake Élimé, Lake Hogo, Lake Djiara, Lake Ahoita, Lake Daléyala, and Lake Boukkou.

The total surface area of the lakes is about 20 square kilometres (8 mi^{2}). The largest of the lakes, Lake Yoa, has about a 3.5-square-kilometre (1 mi^{2}) area and attains 20 metres (66 ft) in depth.

The names of the lake groups are derived from the name of a village nearby (literally, Ounianga Kebìr = "the great Ounianga" and Ounianga Sehrìr = "little Ounianga").

== Geography ==
Water accumulated in an underground aquifer during the wet millennia is supplied to the lakes.

When water is exposed at the surface in highly arid environments it becomes saline due to a high rate of evaporation as is the case with the lakes of the Ounianga Kebìr group. The rate of evaporation from Lake Yoa is equivalent to 6 metres (20 ft) a year and the total lake depth is 25 metres (82 ft).

The lakes of the Ounianga Sérir group form a hydrological system that is unique in Earth’s deserts. Unique physical factors combine to keep all of the lakes fresh, except the central Lake Teli. Wind blown sand separated the basin into 10 lakes with Lake Teli occupying the central position. Thick mats of reeds cover the surface of the smaller fresh water lakes where they slow evaporation, but are absent from the saline waters of Lake Teli. As a result, greater evaporation takes place from the surface of Lake Teli, keeping its water level lower. This allows water from the adjacent lakes to flow through the permeable dune barriers into Lake Teli keeping their waters fresh.

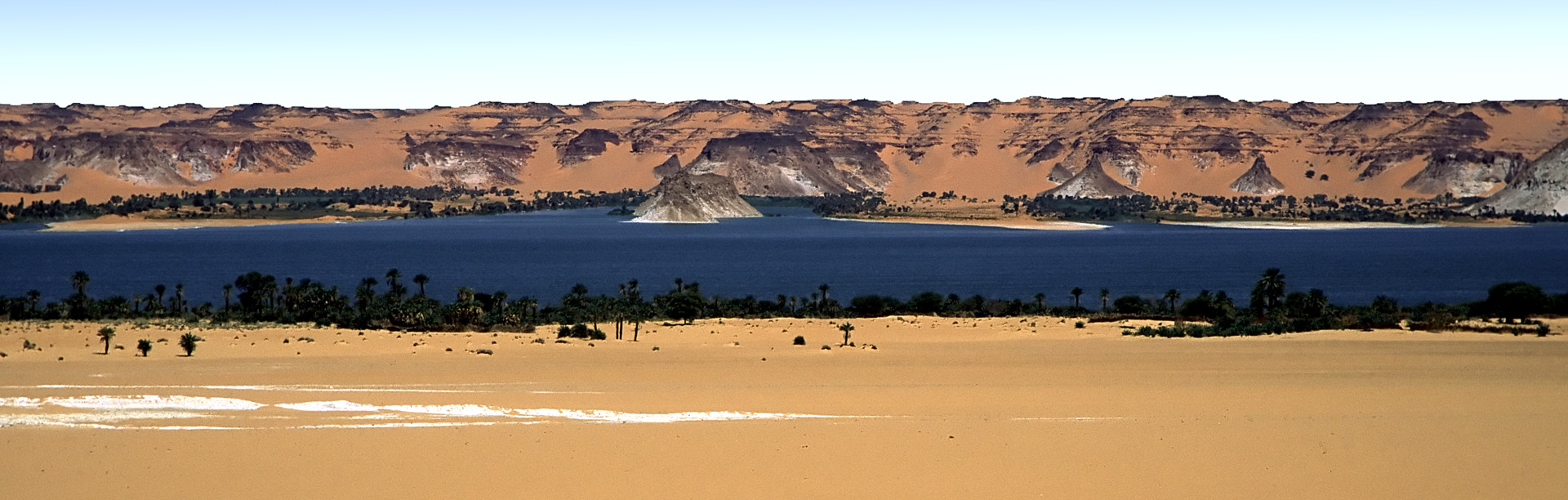
Panorama of Sérir

== Connection to the history of humanity ==
The climatic history of the region is speculated to have a connection to human migrations at the end of the last ice age about 11,000 years ago. The desert returned to the area after monsoons diminished about 5,000 years ago. Investigation of a drilling core revealed 10,940 layers in 16 metres (52 ft) of sediments from the bottom of the Lake Yoa before reaching the ice-age desert floor, each layer corresponding to 1 year. There is aerial photographic evidence that shows early human settlers of the lakes attempted to stop the desertification that inevitably buried their orchards and crops. During the African humid period the early humans found the freshwater lake area to be fertile enough to grow crops and may have also domesticated cattle. Rock art found in many areas of the Sahara attest to that. However, a change in the climate slowly and eventually led to drought that continues to this day. As the desert wind from the northeast blew, it carried sand from the plateau above down through notches in the land, depositing it right where farmers were growing crops. Seeing that the sand would eventually smother their crops and orchards the lake dwellers attempted to stop it by erecting barriers. These barriers can be seen in aerial photographs at several places among both Ounianga Kebìr and Serìr. They appear as series of “V’s” like this: VVVVVV with some as long as 700 m (2,300 ft) across and in rows. The effort appears to be extraordinary for it would have required many people to erect the many layers of barriers that can be seen today. Unfortunately these “fences” failed and sand eventually claimed the area driving out the settlers anywhere between 7,500 and 5,000 years ago.
